= List of primary schools in Northern Ireland =

This is a list of state maintained primary schools in Northern Ireland.

School name	Location	County	School type
Abbey Primary School	Newtownards	County Down	Controlled
Abbots Cross Primary School	Newtownabbey	County Antrim	Controlled
Abercorn Primary School	Banbridge	County Down	Controlled
Academy Primary School	Saintfield	County Down	Controlled
Acorn Integrated Primary School	Carrickfergus	County Antrim	Grant Maintained Integrated
Aghadrumsee Primary School	Rosslea	County Fermanagh	Controlled
Alexander Dickson Primary School	Ballygowan	County Down	Controlled
All Children's Integrated Primary School	Newcastle	County Down	Controlled Integrated
All Saints' Primary School	Omagh	County Tyrone	Roman Catholic
Ampertaine Primary School	Upperlands	County Londonderry	Controlled
Anahilt Primary Schoo	Hillsborough	County Down	Controlled
Anahorish Primary School	Toomebridge	County Antrim	Controlled
Andrews Memorial Primary School	Comber	County Down	Controlled
Annalong Primary School	Annalong	County Down	Controlled
Annsborough Integrated Primary School	Castlewellan	County Down	Controlled Integrated
Antrim Primary School	Antrim	County Antrim	Controlled
Ardstraw Jubilee Primary School	Newtownstewart	County Tyrone	Controlled
Armoy Primary School	Armoy	County Antrim	Controlled
Armstrong Primary School	Armagh	County Armagh	Controlled
Artigarvan Primary School	Strabane	County Tyrone	Controlled
Ashgrove Primary School	Carnmoney	County Antrim	Controlled
Ashlea Primary School	Derry	County Londonderry	Controlled
Augher Central Primary School	Augher	County Tyrone	Controlled
Aughnacloy Primary School	Aughnacloy	County Tyrone	Controlled
Ballinamallard Primary School	Ballinamallard	County Fermanagh	Controlled
Ballinderry Primary School	Lower Ballinderry	County Antrim	Controlled
Ballougry Primary School	Derry	County Londonderry	Controlled
Ballycarrickmaddy Primary School	Upper Ballinderry	County Antrim	Controlled
Ballycarry Primary School	Ballycarry	County Antrim	Controlled
Ballycastle Integrated Primary School	Ballycastle	County Antrim	Controlled Integrated
Ballyclare Primary School	Ballyclare	County Antrim	Controlled
Ballycraigy Primary School	Muckamore	County Antrim	Controlled
Ballydown Primary School	Banbridge	County Down	Controlled
Ballyhenry Primary School	Glengormley	County Antrim	Controlled
Ballyholland Primary School	Newry	County Down	Roman Catholic
Ballyholme Primary School	Bangor	County Down	Controlled
Ballykeel Primary School	Ballymena	County Antrim	Controlled
Ballykelly Primary School	Ballykelly	County Londonderry	Controlled
Ballylifford Primary School	Cookstown	County Tyrone	Roman Catholic
Ballymacash Primary School	Lisburn	County Antrim	Controlled
Ballymacrickett Primary School	Glenavy	County Antrim	Roman Catholic
Ballymacward Primary School	Lisburn	County Antrim	Roman Catholic
Ballymagee Primary School	Bangor	County Down	Controlled
Ballymena Primary School	Ballymena	County Antrim	Controlled
Ballymoney Model Integrated Primary School	Ballymoney	County Antrim	Controlled Integrated
Ballynahinch Primary School	Ballynahinch	County Down	Controlled
Ballynure Primary School	Ballynure	County Antrim	Controlled
Ballyoran Primary School	Portadown	County Armagh	Controlled
Ballysally Primary School	Coleraine	County Londonderry	Controlled
Ballysillan Primary School	Belfast	County Antrim	Controlled
Ballytober Primary School	Bushmills	County Antrim	Controlled
Ballytrea Primary School	Stewartstown	County Tyrone	Controlled
Ballyvester Primary School	Donaghadee	County Down	Controlled
Ballywalter Primary School	Ballywalter	County Down	Controlled
Bangor Central Integrated Primary School	Bangor	County Down	Controlled Integrated
Bellaghy Primary School	Bellaghy	County Londonderry	Controlled
Belleek Primary School	Belleek	County Fermanagh	Controlled
Belmont Primary School, Belfast	Belfast	County Antrim	Controlled
Belvoir Park Primary School	Belfast	County Down	Controlled
Bessbrook Primary School	Bessbrook	County Armagh	Controlled
Birches Primary School	Portadown	County Armagh	Controlled
Blackmountain Primary School	Belfast	County Antrim	Controlled
Bleary Primary School	Lurgan	County Armagh	Controlled
Blessed Patrick O'Loughran Primary School	Castlecaulfield	County Tyrone	Roman Catholic
Bloomfield Primary School	Bangor	County Down	Controlled
Blythefield Primary School	Belfast	County Antrim	Controlled
Bocombra Primary School	Portadown	County Armagh	Controlled
Botanic Primary School	Belfast	County Antrim	Controlled
Brackenagh West Primary School	Kilkeel	County Down	Controlled
Braidside Integrated Primary School	Ballymena	County Antrim	Grant Maintained Integrated
Braniel Primary School	Belfast	County Antrim	Controlled
Bready Jubilee Primary School	Bready	County Tyrone	Controlled
Bridge Integrated Primary School	Banbridge	County Down	Grant Maintained Integrated
Broadbridge Primary School	Eglinton	County Londonderry	Roman Catholic
Bronte Primary School	Banbridge	County Down	Controlled
Brooklands Primary School, Dundonald	Dundonald	County Antrim	Controlled
Broughshane Primary School	Broughshane	County Antrim	Controlled
Brownlee Primary School	Lisburn	County Antrim	Controlled
Buick Memorial Primary School	Cullybackey	County Antrim	Controlled
Bunscoil an Iúir	Newry	County Down	Other Maintained
Bunscoil an Traonaigh	Lisnaskea	County Fermanagh	Other Maintained
Bunscoil an tSléibhe Dhuibh	Belfast	County Antrim	Other Maintained
Bunscoil Bheanna Boirche	Castlewellan	County Down	Other Maintained
Bunscoil Cholmcille & Naíscoil Dhoire	Derry	County Londonderry	Roman Catholic
Bunscoil Mhic Reachtain	Belfast	County Antrim	Controlled
Bunscoil Phobal Feirste	Belfast	County Antrim	Other Maintained
Bush Primary School	Dungannon	County Tyrone	Controlled
Bushmills Primary School	Bushmills	County Antrim	Controlled
Bushvalley Primary School	Stranocum	County Antrim	Controlled
Cairncastle Primary School	Ballygally	County Antrim	Controlled
Cairnshill Integrated Primary School	Belfast	County Down	Controlled Integrated
Camphill Primary School	Ballymena	County Antrim	Controlled
Carhill Integrated Primary School	Garvagh	County Londonderry	Controlled Integrated
Carnaghts Primary School	Ballymena	County Antrim	Controlled
Carnalridge Primary School	Portrush	County Antrim	Controlled
Carniny Primary School	Ballymena	County Antrim	Controlled
Carnlough Integrated Primary School	Carnlough	County Antrim	Controlled Integrated
Carnmoney Primary School	Carnmoney	County Antrim	Controlled
Carntall Primary School	Clogher	County Tyrone	Controlled
Carr Primary School	Lisburn	County Down	Controlled
Carr's Glen Primary School	Belfast	County Antrim	Controlled
Carrick Primary School, Lurgan	Lurgan	County Armagh	Controlled
Carrick Primary School, Warrenpoint	Warrenpoint	County Down	Roman Catholic
Carrickfergus Model Primary School	Carrickfergus	County Antrim	Controlled
Carrickmannon Primary School	Newtownards	County Down	Controlled
Carrowdore Primary School	Newtownards	County Down	Controlled
Carrowreagh Primary School	Ballymoney	County Antrim	Controlled
Carryduff Primary School	Carryduff	County Down	Controlled
Castle Gardens Primary School	Newtownards	County Down	Controlled
Castledawson Primary School	Castledawson	County Londonderry	Controlled
Castleroe Primary School	Coleraine	County Londonderry	Controlled
Cavehill Primary School	Belfast	County Antrim	Controlled
Cedar Integrated Primary School	Crossgar	County Down	Grant Maintained Integrated
Central Integrated Primary School	Carrickfergus	County Antrim	Controlled Integrated
Chapel Road Primary School	Waterside	County Londonderry	Roman Catholic
Christ The King Primary School	Ballynahinch	County Down	Roman Catholic
Christ the King Primary School	Omagh	County Tyrone	Roman Catholic
Christ the Redeemer Primary School	Dunmurry	County Armagh	Roman Catholic
Christian Brothers' Primary School	Armagh	County Armagh	Roman Catholic
Churchill Primary School	Caledon	County Tyrone	Controlled
Churchtown Primary School	Cookstown	County Tyrone	Controlled
Clandeboye Primary School	Bangor	County Down	Controlled
Clare Primary School	Clare	County Armagh	Controlled
Clea Primary School	Keady	County Armagh	Roman Catholic
Cliftonville Integrated Primary School	Belfast	County Antrim	Controlled Integrated
Clintyclay Primary School	Dungannon	County Tyrone	Roman Catholic
Clonalig Primary School	Newry	County Down	Roman Catholic
Clough Primary School	Clogh	County Antrim	Controlled
Cloughmills Primary School	Cloughmills	County Antrim	Controlled
Coagh Primary School	Coagh	County Tyrone	Controlled
Comber Primary School	Comber	County Down	Controlled
Cookstown Primary School	Cookstown	County Tyrone	Controlled
Cooley Primary School	Omagh	County Tyrone	Controlled
Corran Integrated Primary School	Larne	County Antrim	Grant Maintained Integrated
Cortamlet Primary School	Newry	County Down	Controlled
Cranmore Integrated Primary School	Belfast	County Antrim	Grant Maintained Integrated
Crawfordsburn Primary School	Crawfordsburn	County Down	Controlled
Creavery Primary School	Antrim	County Antrim	Controlled
Cregagh Primary School	Belfast	County Antrim	Controlled
Creggan Primary School	Randalstown	County Antrim	Roman Catholic
Crossroads Primary School	Kilrea	County Londonderry	Roman Catholic
Crumlin Integrated Primary School	Crumlin	County Antrim	Controlled Integrated
Culcrow Primary School	Aghadowey	County Londonderry	Controlled
Culmore Primary School	Derry	County Londonderry	Controlled
Cumber Claudy Primary School	Claudy	County Londonderry	Controlled
Cumran Primary School	Clough	County Down	Controlled
Currie Primary School	Belfast	County Antrim	Controlled
D.H. Christie Memorial Primary School	Coleraine	County Londonderry	Controlled
Damhead Primary School	Coleraine	County Londonderry	Controlled
Darkley Primary School	Darkley	County Armagh	Controlled
Denamona Primary School	Fintona	County Tyrone	Controlled
Derryboy Primary School	Downpatrick	County Down	Controlled
Derrychrin Primary School	Coagh	County Tyrone	Roman Catholic
Derrygonnelly Primary School	Enniskillen	County Fermanagh	Controlled
Derryhale Primary School	Derryhale	County Armagh	Controlled
Derrylatinee Primary School	Dungannon	County Tyrone	Roman Catholic
Dickson Primary School	Lurgan	County Armagh	Controlled
Doagh Primary School	Doagh	County Antrim	Controlled
Donacloney Primary School	Donaghcloney	County Down	Controlled
Donaghadee Primary School	Donaghadee	County Down	Controlled
Donaghey Primary School	Dungannon	County Tyrone	Controlled
Donaghmore Primary School	Donaghmore	County Tyrone	Controlled
Donegall Road Primary School	Belfast	County Antrim	Controlled
Donemana Primary School	Donemana	County Tyrone	Controlled
Downpatrick Primary School	Downpatrick	County Down	Controlled
Downshire Primary School	Hillsborough	County Down	Controlled
Dromara Primary School	Dromara	County Down	Controlled
Dromintee Primary School	Newry	County Down	Roman Catholic
Dromore Central Primary School	Dromore	County Down	Controlled
Dromore Primary School	Omagh	County Tyrone	Controlled
Dromore Road Primary School	Warrenpoint	County Down	Controlled
Drumachose Primary School	Limavady	County Londonderry	Controlled
Drumadonnell Primary School	Banbridge	County Down	Controlled
Drumahoe Primary School	Drumahoe	County Londonderry	Controlled
Drumgor Primary School	Craigavon	County Armagh	Controlled
Drumhillery Primary School	Middletown	County Armagh	Controlled
Drumlins Integrated Primary School	Ballynahinch	County Down	Grant Maintained Integrated
Drumrane Primary School	Dungiven	County Londonderry	Controlled
Dunclug Primary School	Ballymena	County Antrim	Controlled
Dundela Primary School	Belfast	County Antrim	Controlled
Dundonald Primary School	Dundonald	County Down	Controlled
Dungannon Primary School	Dungannon	County Tyrone	Controlled
Dunmurry Primary School	Dunmurry	County Antrim	Controlled
Dunseverick Primary School	Dunseverick	County Antrim	Controlled
Earlview Primary School	Newtownabbey	County Antrim	Controlled
Ebrington Primary School	Derry	County Londonderry	Controlled
Eden Primary School, Ballymoney	Ballymoney	County Antrim	Controlled
Eden Primary School, Carrickfergus	Carrickfergus	County Antrim	Controlled
Edenbrooke Primary School	Belfast	County Antrim	Controlled
Edenderry Primary School, Banbridge	Banbridge	County Down	Controlled
Edenderry Primary School, Portadown	Portadown	County Armagh	Controlled
Edendork Primary School	Dungannon	County Tyrone	Roman Catholic
Edwards Primary School	Castlederg	County Tyrone	Controlled
Eglinton Primary School	Eglinton	County Londonderry	Controlled
Elmgrove Primary School	Belfast	County Antrim	Controlled
Enniskillen Integrated Primary School	Enniskillen	County Fermanagh	Grant Maintained Integrated
Enniskillen Model Primary School	Enniskillen	County Fermanagh	Controlled
Euston Street Primary School	Belfast	County Antrim	Controlled
Fair Hill Primary School	Dromara	County Down	Controlled
Fairview Primary School	Ballyclare	County Antrim	Controlled
Fane Street Primary School	Belfast	County Antrim	Controlled
Faughanvale Primary School	Greysteel	County Londonderry	Roman Catholic
Finaghy Primary School	Belfast	County Antrim	Controlled
Fivemiletown Primary School	Fivemiletown	County Tyrone	Controlled
Florencecourt Primary School	Enniskillen	County Fermanagh	Controlled
Foley Primary School	Armagh	County Armagh	Controlled
Forge Integrated Primary School	Belfast	County Antrim	Controlled Integrated
Fort Hill Integrated Primary School	Lisburn	County Antrim	Controlled Integrated
Forth River Primary School	Belfast	County Antrim	Controlled
Fountain Primary School	Derry	County Londonderry	Controlled
Fourtowns Primary School	Ahoghill	County Antrim	Controlled
Gaelscoil an Chaistil	Ballycastle	County Antrim	Other Maintained
Gaelscoil an Lonnain	Belfast	County Antrim	Other Maintained
Gaelscoil an tSeanchaí	Magherafelt	County Londonderry	Other Maintained
Gaelscoil Aodha Rua	Dungannon	County Tyrone	Other Maintained
Gaelscoil Éanna	Glengormley	County Antrim	Other Maintained
Gaelscoil Ghleann Darach	Crumlin	County Antrim	Other Maintained
Gaelscoil Léim an Mhadaidh	Limavady	County Londonderry	Other Maintained
Gaelscoil na bhFál	Belfast	County Antrim	Other Maintained
Gaelscoil na Daróige	Derry	County Londonderry	Other Maintained
Gaelscoil na gCrann	Omagh	County Tyrone	Other Maintained
Gaelscoil na mBeann	Kilkeel	County Down	Other Maintained
Gaelscoil na Móna	Belfast	County Antrim	Other Maintained
Gaelscoil na Speiríní	Ballinascreen	County Londonderry	Other Maintained
Gaelscoil Neachtain	Dungiven	County Londonderry	Controlled
Gaelscoil Uí Dhochartaigh	Strabane	County Tyrone	Other Maintained
Gaelscoil Uí Néill	Coalisland	County Tyrone	Other Maintained
Garryduff Primary School	Ballymoney	County Antrim	Controlled
Garvagh Primary School	Garvagh	County Londonderry	Controlled
Gibson Primary School	Omagh	County Tyrone	Controlled
Gilford Primary School	Craigavon	County Armagh	Controlled
Gilnahirk Primary School	Belfast	County Antrim	Controlled
Glasswater Primary School	Crossgar	County Down	Controlled
Glenann Primary School	Cushendall	County Antrim	Roman Catholic
Glencraig Integrated Primary School	Holywood	County Down	Controlled Integrated
Glendermott Primary School	Derry	County Londonderry	Roman Catholic
Glengormley Integrated Primary School	Glengormley	County Antrim	Controlled Integrated
Glenwood Primary School	Belfast	County Antrim	Controlled
Glynn Primary School	Glynn	County Antrim	Controlled
Good Shepherd Primary School, Derry	Waterside	County Londonderry	Roman Catholic
Gorran Primary School	Coleraine	County Londonderry	Controlled
Gortin Primary School	Gortin	County Tyrone	Controlled
Gracehill Primary School	Gracehill	County Antrim	Controlled
Grange Park Primary School	Bangor	County Down	Controlled
Grange Primary School, Kilkeel	Kilkeel	County Down	Roman Catholic
Greenhaw Primary School	Derry	County Londonderry	Controlled
Greenisland Primary School	Greenisland	County Antrim	Controlled
Greenwood Primary School	Belfast	County Antrim	Controlled
Grey Abbey Primary School	Greyabbey	County Down	Controlled
Greystone Primary School	Antrim	County Antrim	Controlled
Groggan Primary School	Randalstown	County Antrim	Controlled
Hamiltonsbawn Primary School	Hamiltonsbawn	County Armagh	Controlled
Harding Memorial Integrated Primary School	Belfast	County Antrim	Controlled Integrated
Hardy Memorial Primary School	Richhill	County Armagh	Controlled
Harmony Primary School	Belfast	County Antrim	Controlled
Harmony Hill Primary School	Lisburn	County Antrim	Controlled
Harpur's Hill Primary School	Coleraine	County Londonderry	Controlled
Harryville Primary School	Ballymena	County Antrim	Controlled
Hart Memorial Primary School	Portadown	County Armagh	Controlled
Hazelbank Primary School	Aughafatten	County Antrim	Controlled
Hazelwood Integrated Primary School	Newtownabbey	County Antrim	Grant Maintained Integrated
Hezlett Primary School	Castlerock	County Londonderry	Controlled
Hollybank Primary School	Monkstown	County Antrim	Controlled
Hollybush Primary School	Culmore	County Londonderry	Roman Catholic
Holy Child Primary School	Andersonstown	County Antrim	Roman Catholic
Holy Child Primary School	Creggan	County Londonderry	Roman Catholic
Holy Cross Boys' Primary School	Belfast	County Antrim	Roman Catholic
Holy Cross Girls' Primary School	Belfast	County Antrim	Roman Catholic
Holy Cross Primary School	Kilkeel	County Down	Roman Catholic
Holy Evangelists' Primary School	Twinbrook	County Antrim	Roman Catholic
Holy Family Primary School	Belfast	County Antrim	Roman Catholic
Holy Family Primary School	Shantallow	County Londonderry	Roman Catholic
Holy Family Primary School	Magherafelt	County Londonderry	Roman Catholic
Holy Family Primary School	Dungannon	County Tyrone	Roman Catholic
Holy Family Primary School	Omagh	County Tyrone	Roman Catholic
Holy Rosary Primary School	Belfast	County Antrim	Roman Catholic
Holy Trinity Primary School	Belfast	County Antrim	Roman Catholic
Holy Trinity Primary School	Enniskillen	County Fermanagh	Roman Catholic
Holy Trinity Primary School	Cookstown	County Tyrone	Roman Catholic
Holywood Primary School	Holywood	County Down	Controlled
Holywood Rudolf Steiner School	Holywood	County Down	Private
Howard Primary School	Moygashel	County Tyrone	Controlled
Irish Society's Primary School	Coleraine	County Londonderry	Controlled
Irvinestown Primary School	Irvinestown	County Fermanagh	Controlled
Islandmagee Primary School	Islandmagee	County Antrim	Controlled
Iveagh Primary School	Rathfriland	County Down	Controlled
John Paul II Primary School	Belfast	County Antrim	Roman Catholic
Jones Memorial Primary School	Enniskillen	County Fermanagh	Controlled
Jonesborough Primary School	Jonesborough	County Armagh	Roman Catholic
Kells and Connor Primary School	Kells	County Antrim	Controlled
Kesh Primary School	Kesh	County Fermanagh	Controlled
Kilbride Central Primary School	Doagh	County Antrim	Controlled
Kilbroney Integrated Primary School	Rostrevor	County Down	Controlled Integrated
Kilcooley Primary School	Bangor	County Down	Controlled
Kilkeel Primary School	Kilkeel	County Down	Controlled
Killen Primary School	Killen	County Tyrone	Controlled
Killinchy Primary School	Killinchy	County Down	Controlled
Killowen Primary School, Coleraine	Coleraine	County Londonderry	Controlled
Killowen Primary School, Rostrevor	Rostrevor	County Down	Roman Catholic
Killowen Primary School	Lisburn	County Antrim	Controlled
Killyhommon Primary School	Boho	County Fermanagh	Roman Catholic
Killylea Primary School	Killylea	County Armagh	Controlled
Killyleagh Integrated Primary School	Killyleagh	County Down	Controlled Integrated
Killyman Primary School	Dungannon	County Tyrone	Controlled
Kilmaine Primary School	Bangor	County Down	Controlled
Kilmoyle Primary School	Ballymoney	County Antrim	Controlled
Kilrea Primary School	Kilrea	County Londonderry	Controlled
King's Park Primary School	Lurgan	County Armagh	Controlled
King's Park Primary School	Newtownabbey	County Antrim	Controlled
Kircubbin Integrated Primary School	Kircubbin	County Down	Controlled Integrated
Kirkinriola Primary School	Ballymena	County Antrim	Controlled
Kirkistown Primary School	Cloughey	County Down	Controlled
Knockahollet Primary School	Dunloy	County Antrim	Controlled
Knockbreda Primary School	Belfast	County Antrim	Controlled
Knockloughrim Primary School	Knockcloghrim	County Londonderry	Controlled
Knockmore Primary School	Lisburn	County Antrim	Controlled
Knocknagin Primary School	Desertmartin	County Londonderry	Roman Catholic
Knocknagoney School	Belfast	County Antrim	Controlled
Knocknagor Primary School	Trillick	County Tyrone	Roman Catholic
Laghey Primary School	Killyman	County Tyrone	Roman Catholic
Landhead Primary School	Ballymoney	County Antrim	Controlled
Langfield Primary School	Drumquin	County Tyrone	Controlled
Largymore Primary School	Lisburn	County Antrim	
Larne and Inver Primary School	Larne	County Antrim	Controlled
Leadhill Primary School	Belfast	County Antrim	Controlled
Leaney Primary School	Ballymoney	County Antrim	Controlled
Ligoniel Primary School	Belfast	County Antrim	Controlled
Limavady Central Primary School	Limavady	County Londonderry	Controlled
Linn Primary School	Larne	County Antrim	Controlled
Lisbellaw Primary School	Lisbellaw	County Fermanagh	Controlled
Lisburn Central Primary School	Lisburn	County Antrim	Controlled
Lislagan Primary School	Ballymoney	County Antrim	Controlled
Lisnadill Primary School	Lisnadill	County Armagh	Controlled
Lisnagelvin Primary School	Derry	County Londonderry	Controlled
Lisnasharragh Primary School	Belfast	County Antrim	Controlled
Lissan Primary School	Cookstown	County Tyrone	Roman Catholic
Loanends Primary School	Nutts Corner	County Antrim	Controlled
Londonderry Model Primary School	Derry	County Londonderry	Controlled
Londonderry Primary School	Newtownards	County Down	Controlled
Longtower Primary School	Derry	County Londonderry	Roman Catholic
Lough View Integrated Primary School	Castlereagh	County Antrim	Grant Maintained Integrated
Loughries Integrated Primary School	Newtownards	County Down	Controlled Integrated
Lowwood Primary School	Belfast	County Antrim	Controlled
Lurgan Model Integrated Primary School	Lurgan	County Armagh	Controlled Integrated
Macosquin Primary School	Macosquin	County Londonderry	Controlled
Maghaberry Primary School	Craigavon	County Armagh	Controlled
Maghera Primary School	Maghera	County Londonderry	Controlled
Magherafelt Primary School	Magherafelt	County Londonderry	Controlled
Maguiresbridge Primary School	Maguiresbridge	County Fermanagh	Controlled
Maine Integrated Primary School	Randalstown	County Antrim	Grant Maintained Integrated
Mallusk Integrated Primary School	Newtownabbey	County Antrim	Controlled Integrated
Malvern Primary School, Belfast	Belfast	County Antrim	Controlled
Maralin Village Primary School	Magheralin	County Armagh	Controlled
Markethill Primary School	Markethill	County Armagh	Controlled
Mary Queen of Peace Primary School	Martinstown	County Antrim	Roman Catholic
McClintock Primary School	Seskinore	County Tyrone	Controlled
McKinney Primary School	Dundrod	County Antrim	Controlled
Meadow Bridge Primary School	Hillsborough	County Down	Controlled
Mercy Primary School	Belfast	County Antrim	Roman Catholic
Millburn Primary School	Coleraine	County Londonderry	Controlled
Millennium Integrated Primary School	Saintfield	County Down	Grant Maintained Integrated
Millington Primary School	Portadown	County Armagh	Controlled
Millisle Primary School	Millisle	County Down	Controlled
Millquarter Primary School	Toomebridge	County Antrim	Roman Catholic
Millstrand Integrated Primary School	Portrush	County Antrim	Grant Maintained Integrated
Milltown Primary School	Banbridge	County Down	Controlled
Moat Primary School	Enniskillen	County Fermanagh	Controlled
Moira Primary School	Moira	County Down	Controlled
Moneymore Primary School	Moneymore	County Londonderry	Controlled
Moneynick Primary School	Randalstown	County Antrim	Roman Catholic
Moneyrea Primary School	Moneyreagh	County Down	Controlled
Moorfields Primary School	Ballymena	County Antrim	Controlled
Mossgrove Primary School	Glengormley	County Antrim	Controlled
Mossley Primary School	Newtownabbey	County Antrim	Controlled
Mount St Catherine's Primary School	Armagh	County Armagh	Roman Catholic
Mount St Michael's Primary School	Randalstown	County Antrim	Roman Catholic
Mountnorris Primary School	Mountnorris	County Armagh	Controlled
Moy Regional Primary School	Moy	County Tyrone	Controlled
Moyallon Primary School	Portadown	County Armagh	Controlled
Moyle Primary School	Larne	County Antrim	Controlled
Mullaglass Primary School	Mullaghglass	County Armagh	Controlled
Mullavilly Primary School	Mullavilly	County Armagh	Controlled
Naíscoil & Bunscoil Bheann Mhadagáin	Belfast	County Antrim	Other Maintained
Naíscoil & Gaelscoil Éadain Mhóir	Derry	County Londonderry	Other Maintained
Naíscoil & Gaelscoil Eoghain	Cookstown	County Tyrone	Other Maintained
Nazareth House Primary School	Derry	County Londonderry	Roman Catholic
Nettlefield Primary School	Belfast	County Antrim	Controlled
New Row St. Patrick's Primary School	Castledawson	County Londonderry	Roman Catholic
Newbuildings Primary School	Newbuildings	County Londonderry	Controlled
Newcastle Primary School	Newcastle	County Down	Controlled
Newmills Primary School	Dungannon	County Tyrone	Controlled
Newtownards Model Primary School	Newtownards	County Down	Controlled
Newtownbutler Primary School	Newtownbutler	County Fermanagh	Controlled
Newtownhamilton Primary School	Newry	County Down	Controlled
Newtownstewart Model Primary School	Newtownstewart	County Tyrone	Controlled
Oakfield Primary School	Carrickfergus	County Antrim	Controlled
Oakgrove Integrated Primary School	Derry	County Londonderry	Grant Maintained Integrated
Oakwood Integrated Primary School	Dunmurry	County Antrim	Grant Maintained Integrated
Old Warren Primary School	Lisburn	County Antrim	Controlled
Olderfleet Primary School	Larne	County Antrim	Controlled
Omagh County Primary School	Omagh	County Tyrone	Controlled
Omagh Integrated Primary School	Omagh	County Tyrone	Grant Maintained Integrated
Orangefield Primary School	Belfast	County Antrim	Controlled
Orchard County Primary School	Portadown	County Armagh	Controlled
Orritor Primary School	Cookstown	County Tyrone	Controlled
Our Lady & St Patrick Primary School	Downpatrick	County Down	Roman Catholic
Our Lady of Fatima Primary School	Tamnaherin	County Londonderry	Roman Catholic
Our Lady of Lourdes Primary School	Belfast	County Antrim	Roman Catholic
Our Lady of Lourdes Primary School	Greencastle	County Tyrone	Roman Catholic
Our Lady Queen Of Peace Primary School	Dunmurry	County Antrim	Roman Catholic
Our Lady's & St Mochua's Primary School	Keady	County Armagh	Roman Catholic
Our Lady's Primary School, Dungannon	Dungannon	County Tyrone	Roman Catholic
Parkhall Primary School	Antrim	County Antrim	Controlled
Phoenix Integrated Primary School	Cookstown	County Tyrone	Grant Maintained Integrated
Pond Park Primary School	Lisburn	County Antrim	Controlled
Portadown Integrated Primary School	Portadown	County Armagh	Grant Maintained Integrated
Portaferry Integrated Primary School	Portaferry	County Down	Controlled Integrated
Portavogie Primary School	Portavogie	County Down	Controlled
Portglenone Primary School	Portglenone	County Antrim	Controlled
Portrush Primary School	Portrush	County Antrim	Controlled
Portstewart Primary School	Portstewart	County Londonderry	Controlled
Poyntzpass Primary School	Poyntzpass	County Armagh	Controlled
Presentation Primary School	Portadown	County Armagh	Roman Catholic
Primate Dixon Primary School	Coalisland	County Tyrone	Roman Catholic
Queen Elizabeth II Primary School	Pomeroy	County Tyrone	Controlled
Queen Elizabeth II Primary School	Trillick	County Tyrone	Controlled
Randalstown Central Primary School	Randalstown	County Antrim	Controlled
Rasharkin Primary School	Rasharkin	County Antrim	Controlled
Rathcoole Primary School	Newtownabbey	County Antrim	Controlled
Rathmore Primary School	Bangor	County Down	Controlled
Richmond Primary School, Ballygawley	Ballygawley	County Tyrone	Controlled
Richmount Primary School	Portadown	County Armagh	Controlled
Riverdale Primary School	Lisburn	County Antrim	Controlled
Roan St Patrick's Primary School	Eglish	County Tyrone	Roman Catholic
Roe Valley Integrated Primary School	Limavady	County Londonderry	Grant Maintained Integrated
Roscavey Primary School	Beragh	County Tyrone	Roman Catholic
Rosemount Primary School, Derry	Derry	County Londonderry	Roman Catholic
Rosetta Primary School, Belfast	Belfast	County Antrim	Controlled
Round Tower Integrated Primary School	Antrim	County Antrim	Controlled Integrated
Rowandale Integrated Primary School	Moira	County Down	Grant Maintained Integrated
Sacred Heart Primary School, Derry	Waterside	County Londonderry	Roman Catholic
Sacred Heart Primary School, Dundrum	Dundrum	County Down	Roman Catholic
Sacred Heart Primary School, Dungannon	Dungannon	County Tyrone	Roman Catholic
Saints & Scholars Integrated Primary School	Armagh	County Armagh	Grant Maintained Integrated
Scarva Primary School	Craigavon	County Armagh	Controlled
Scoil an Droichid	Belfast	County Antrim	Other Maintained
Scoil na Fuiseoige	Belfast	County Antrim	Other Maintained
Seagoe Primary School	Portadown	County Armagh	Other Maintained
Seaview Integrated Primary School	Glenarm	County Antrim	Controlled Integrated
Seaview Primary School	Belfast	County Antrim	Controlled
Seymour Hill Primary School	Dunmurry	County Antrim	Controlled
Silverstream Primary School	Greenisland	County Antrim	Controlled
Sion Mills Integrated Primary School	Sion Mills	County Tyrone	Controlled Integrated
Six Mile Integrated Primary School	Antrim	County Antrim	Controlled Integrated
Spa Primary School	Ballynahinch	County Down	Controlled
Spires Integrated Primary School	Magherafelt	County Londonderry	Grant Maintained Integrated
Springfield Primary School, Belfast	Belfast	County Antrim	Controlled
Springhill Primary School, Belfast	Belfast	County Antrim	Controlled
St. Aidan's Primary School, Derry	Magilligan	County Londonderry	Roman Catholic
St. Aloysius Primary School	Lisburn	County Antrim	Roman Catholic
St. Anne's Primary School	Corkey	County Antrim	Roman Catholic
St. Anne's Primary School	Finaghy	County Antrim	Roman Catholic
St. Anne's Primary School	Derry	County Londonderry	Roman Catholic
St. Anthony's Primary School, Craigavon	Craigavon	County Armagh	Roman Catholic
St. Anthony's Primary School, Larne	Larne	County Antrim	Roman Catholic
St. Bernard's Primary School	Belfast	County Antrim	Roman Catholic
St. Bernard's Primary School	Newtownabbey	County Antrim	Roman Catholic
St. Brendan's Primary School	Craigavon	County Armagh	Roman Catholic
St. Bride's Primary School	Belfast	County Antrim	Roman Catholic
St. Brigid's Primary School, Ardglass	Ardglass	County Down	Roman Catholic
St. Brigid's Primary School, Ballymena	Ballymena	County Antrim	Roman Catholic
St. Brigid's Primary School, Ballymoney	Ballymoney	County Antrim	Roman Catholic
St. Brigid's Primary School, Carnhill	Shantallow	County Londonderry	Roman Catholic
St. Brigid's Primary School, Coalisland	Coalisland	County Tyrone	Roman Catholic
St. Brigid's Primary School, Cranagh	Cranagh	County Tyrone	Roman Catholic
St. Brigid's Primary School, Crossmaglen	Crossmaglen	County Down	Roman Catholic
St. Brigid's Primary School, Downpatrick	Downpatrick	County Down	Roman Catholic
St. Brigid's Primary School, Knockloughrim	Knockloughrim	County Londonderry	Roman Catholic
St. Brigid's Primary School, Maghera	Maghera	County Londonderry	Roman Catholic
St. Brigid's Primary School, Mountfield	Mountfield	County Tyrone	Roman Catholic
St. Brigid's Primary School, Omagh	Omagh	County Tyrone	Roman Catholic
St. Bronagh's Primary School	Rostrevor	County Down	Roman Catholic
St. Caireall's Primary School	Castlederg	County Tyrone	Roman Catholic
St. Canice's Primary School	Dungiven	County Londonderry	Roman Catholic
St. Canice's Primary School	Feeny	County Londonderry	Roman Catholic
St. Caolan's Primary School	Saintfield	County Down	Roman Catholic
St. Catherine's Primary School	Strabane	County Tyrone	Roman Catholic
St. Ciaran's Primary School	Cushendun	County Antrim	Roman Catholic
St. Clare's Abbey Primary School	Newry	County Down	Roman Catholic
St. Clare's Primary School	Clonard	County Antrim	Roman Catholic
St. Colman's Primary School, Annaclone	Annaclone	County Down	Roman Catholic
St. Colman's Primary School, Dromore	Dromore	County Down	Roman Catholic
St. Colman's Primary School, Gilford	Gilford	County Armagh	Roman Catholic
St. Colman's Primary School, Kilkeel	Kilkeel	County Down	Roman Catholic
St. Colman's Primary School, Lambeg	Lambeg	County Antrim	Roman Catholic
St. Colman's Primary School, Newry	Newry	County Down	Roman Catholic
St. Colmcille's Primary School	Ballymena	County Antrim	Roman Catholic
St. Colmcille's Primary School	Carrickmore	County Tyrone	Roman Catholic
St. Colmcille's Primary School	Claudy	County Londonderry	Roman Catholic
St. Colmcille's Primary School	Downpatrick	County Down	Roman Catholic
St. Colum's Primary School	Portstewart	County Londonderry	Roman Catholic
St. Columb's Primary School	Desertmartin	County Londonderry	Roman Catholic
St. Columba's Primary School	Clady	County Tyrone	Roman Catholic
St. Columba's Primary School	Draperstown	County Londonderry	Roman Catholic
St. Columba's Primary School	Garvagh	County Londonderry	Roman Catholic
St. Columba's Primary School	Kilrea	County Londonderry	Roman Catholic
St. Columba's Primary School	Newbuildings	County Londonderry	Roman Catholic
St. Columban's Primary School	Belcoo	County Fermanagh	Roman Catholic
St. Columban's Primary School	Belfast	County Antrim	Roman Catholic
St. Columban's Primary School	Kilkeel	County Down	Roman Catholic
St. Comgall's Primary School	Antrim	County Antrim	Roman Catholic
St. Comgall's Primary School	Bangor	County Down	Roman Catholic
St. Conor's Primary School	Omagh	County Tyrone	Roman Catholic
St. Dallan's Primary School	Warrenpoint	County Down	Roman Catholic
St. Davog's Primary School	Belleek	County Fermanagh	Roman Catholic
St. Dympna's Primary School, Dromore	Dromore	County Tyrone	Roman Catholic
St. Eithne's Primary School	Derry	County Londonderry	Roman Catholic
St. Eoghan's Primary School	Draperstown	County Londonderry	Roman Catholic
St. Eugene's Primary School	Derry	County Londonderry	Roman Catholic
St. Eugene's Primary School	Victoria Bridge	County Tyrone	Roman Catholic
St. Finian's Primary School	Newtownards	County Down	Roman Catholic
St. Finlough's Primary School	Ballykelly	County Londonderry	Roman Catholic
St. Francis of Assisi Primary School	Keady	County Armagh	Roman Catholic
St. Francis' Primary School	Banbridge	County Down	Roman Catholic
St. Francis' Primary School	Castlewellan	County Down	Roman Catholic
St. Francis' Primary School	Lurgan	County Armagh	Roman Catholic
St. Ita's Primary School	Belfast	County Antrim	Roman Catholic
St. James's Primary School	Newtownabbey	County Antrim	Roman Catholic
St. Jarlath's Primary School	Blackwatertown	County Armagh	Roman Catholic
St. John Bosco Primary School	Portglenone	County Antrim	Roman Catholic
St. John the Baptist Primary School	Belfast	County Antrim	Roman Catholic
St. John the Baptist Primary School	Portadown	County Armagh	Roman Catholic
St. John's Eglish Primary School	Annaghmore	County Armagh	Roman Catholic
St. John's Primary School, Carnlough	Carnlough	County Antrim	Roman Catholic
St. John's Primary School, Coalisland	Coalisland	County Tyrone	Roman Catholic
St. John's Primary School, Coleraine	Coleraine	County Londonderry	Roman Catholic
St. John's Primary School, Derry	Derry	County Londonderry	Roman Catholic
St. John's Primary School, Dungiven	Dungiven	County Londonderry	Roman Catholic
St. John's Primary School, Gilford	Gilford	County Down	Roman Catholic
St. John's Primary School, Middletown	Middletown	County Armagh	Roman Catholic
St. John's Primary School, Moy	Moy	County Tyrone	Roman Catholic
St. John's Primary School, Swatragh	Swatragh	County Londonderry	Roman Catholic
St. Joseph's Convent Primary School	Newry	County Down	Roman Catholic
St. Joseph's Primary School, Antrim	Antrim	County Antrim	Roman Catholic
St. Joseph's Primary School, Armagh	Armagh	County Armagh	Roman Catholic
St. Joseph's Primary School, Belfast	Belfast	County Antrim	Roman Catholic
St. Joseph's Primary School, Bessbrook	Bessbrook	County Down	Roman Catholic
St. Joseph's Primary School, Caledon	Caledon	County Tyrone	Roman Catholic
St. Joseph's Primary School, Carryduff	Carryduff	County Antrim	Roman Catholic
St. Joseph's Primary School, Cookstown	Cookstown	County Tyrone	Roman Catholic
St. Joseph's Primary School, Crossgar	Crossgar	County Down	Roman Catholic
St. Joseph's Primary School, Crumlin	Crumlin	County Antrim	Roman Catholic
St. Joseph's Primary School, Downpatrick	Downpatrick	County Down	Roman Catholic
St. Joseph's Primary School, Drumquin	Drumquin	County Tyrone	Roman Catholic
St. Joseph's Primary School, Dunloy	Dunloy	County Antrim	Roman Catholic
St. Joseph's Primary School, Enniskillen	Enniskillen	County Fermanagh	Roman Catholic
St. Joseph's Primary School, Galbally	Galbally	County Tyrone	Roman Catholic
St. Joseph's Primary School, Killeavy	Killeavy	County Down	Roman Catholic
St. Joseph's Primary School, Killough	Killough	County Down	Roman Catholic
St. Joseph's Primary School, Lisburn	Lisburn	County Antrim	Roman Catholic
St. Joseph's Primary School, Lisnaskea	Lisnaskea	County Fermanagh	Roman Catholic
St. Joseph's Primary School, Newcastle	Newcastle	County Antrim	Roman Catholic
St. Joseph's Primary School, Strangford	Strangford	County Down	Roman Catholic
St. Joseph's and St. James' Primary School	Poyntzpass	County Down	Roman Catholic
St. Kevin's Primary School	Belfast	County Antrim	Roman Catholic
St. Kieran's Primary School	Poleglass	County Antrim	Roman Catholic
St. Laurence O'Toole's Primary School	Belleek	County Down	Roman Catholic
St. Lawrence's Primary School	Fintona	County Tyrone	Roman Catholic
St. Macartan's Primary School	Clogher	County Tyrone	Roman Catholic
St. Macartan's Primary School	Loughinisland	County Down	Roman Catholic
St. Macartan's Primary School	Roslea	County Fermanagh	Roman Catholic
St. Macnissi's Primary School	Larne	County Antrim	Roman Catholic
St. Macnissi's Primary School	Newtownabbey	County Antrim	Roman Catholic
St. Malachy's Primary School, Armagh	Armagh	County Armagh	Roman Catholic
St. Malachy's Primary School, Bangor	Bangor	County Down	Roman Catholic
St. Malachy's Primary School, Belfast	Belfast	County Antrim	Roman Catholic
St. Malachy's Primary School, Camlough	Camlough	County Down	Roman Catholic
St. Malachy's Primary School, Castlewellan	Castlewellan	County Down	Roman Catholic
St. Malachy's Primary School, Coleraine	Coleraine	County Londonderry	Roman Catholic
St. Malachy's Primary School, Dungannon	Dungannon	County Tyrone	Roman Catholic
St. Malachy's Primary School, Kilcoo	Kilcoo	County Down	Roman Catholic
St. Malachy's Primary School, Magherafelt	Magherafelt	County Londonderry	Roman Catholic
St. Malachy's Primary School, Newry	Newry	County Down	Roman Catholic
St. Malachy's Primary School, Strangford	Strangford	County Down	Roman Catholic
St. Malachy's Primary School, Whitecross	Whitecross	County Armagh	Roman Catholic
St. Martin's Primary School	Enniskillen	County Fermanagh	Roman Catholic
St. Mary's Primary School, Ardglass	Ardglass	County Down	Roman Catholic
St. Mary's Primary School, Armagh	Armagh	County Armagh	Roman Catholic
St. Mary's Primary School, Aughnacloy	Aughnacloy	County Tyrone	Roman Catholic
St. Mary's Primary School, Ballycastle	Ballycastle	County Antrim	Roman Catholic
St. Mary's Primary School, Ballygawley	Ballygawley	County Tyrone	Roman Catholic
St. Mary's Primary School, Ballymagorry	Ballymagorry	County Tyrone	Roman Catholic
St. Mary's Primary School, Banbridge	Banbridge	County Down	Roman Catholic
St. Mary's Primary School, Belfast	Belfast	County Antrim	Roman Catholic
St. Mary's Primary School, Bellaghy	Bellaghy	County Londonderry	Roman Catholic
St. Mary's Primary School, Bellanaleck	Bellanaleck	County Fermanagh	Roman Catholic
St. Mary's Primary School, Brookeborough	Brookeborough	County Fermanagh	Roman Catholic
St. Mary's Primary School, Castlewellan	Castlewellan	County Down	Roman Catholic
St. Mary's Primary School, Clady	Clady	County Antrim	Roman Catholic
St. Mary's Primary School, Claudy	Claudy	County Londonderry	Roman Catholic
St. Mary's Primary School, Comber	Comber	County Down	Roman Catholic
St. Mary's Primary School, Cookstown	Cookstown	County Tyrone	Roman Catholic
St. Mary's Primary School, Cushendall	Cushendall	County Antrim	Roman Catholic
St. Mary's Primary School, Dechomet	Dechomet	County Down	Roman Catholic
St. Mary's Primary School, Derrylin	Derrylin	County Fermanagh	Roman Catholic
St. Mary's Primary School, Draperstown	Draperstown	County Londonderry	Roman Catholic
St. Mary's Primary School, Dungannon	Dungannon	County Tyrone	Roman Catholic
St. Mary's Primary School, Enniskillen	Enniskillen	County Fermanagh	Roman Catholic
St. Mary's Primary School, Fivemiletown	Fivemiletown	County Tyrone	Roman Catholic
St. Mary's Primary School, Gawley's Gate	Gawley's Gate	County Armagh	Roman Catholic
St. Mary's Primary School, Gortnaghey	Gortnaghey	County Londonderry	Roman Catholic
St. Mary's Primary School, Jerrettspass	Jerrettspass	County Down	Roman Catholic
St. Mary's Primary School, Killyleagh	Killyleagh	County Down	Roman Catholic
St. Mary's Primary School, Kircubbin	Kircubbin	County Down	Roman Catholic
St. Mary's Primary School, Lurgan	Lurgan	County Armagh	Roman Catholic
St. Mary's Primary School, Maghera	Maghera	County Londonderry	Roman Catholic
St. Mary's Primary School, Maguiresbridge	Maguiresbridge	County Fermanagh	Roman Catholic
St. Mary's Primary School, Mullaghbawn	Mullaghbawn	County Down	Roman Catholic
St. Mary's Primary School, Newcastle	Newcastle	County Down	Roman Catholic
St. Mary's Primary School, Omagh	Omagh	County Tyrone	Roman Catholic
St. Mary's Primary School, Pomeroy	Pomeroy	County Tyrone	Roman Catholic
St. Mary's Primary School, Portaferry	Portaferry	County Down	Roman Catholic
St. Mary's Primary School, Portglenone	Portglenone	County Antrim	Roman Catholic
St. Mary's Primary School, Rathfriland	Rathfriland	County Down	Roman Catholic
St. Mary's Primary School, Stewartstown	Stewartstown	County Tyrone	Roman Catholic
St. Mary's Primary School, Strabane	Strabane	County Tyrone	Roman Catholic
St. Mary's Primary School, Tempo	Tempo	County Fermanagh	Roman Catholic
St. Mary's Star of the Sea Primary School	Belfast	County Antrim	Roman Catholic
St. Mary's-on-the-Hill Primary School	Newtownabbey	County Antrim	Roman Catholic
St. Matthew's Primary School, Belfast	Belfast	County Antrim	Roman Catholic
St. Matthew's Primary School, Magheramayo	Leitrim	County Down	Roman Catholic
St. Matthew's Primary School, Limavady	Limavady	County Londonderry	Roman Catholic
St. Michael's Primary School, Armagh	Armagh	County Armagh	Roman Catholic
St. Michael's Primary School, Belfast	Belfast	County Antrim	Roman Catholic
St. Michael's Primary School, Dromara	Dromara	County Down	Roman Catholic
St. Michael's Primary School, Dunamanagh	Dunamanagh	County Tyrone	Roman Catholic
St. Michael's Primary School, Newry	Newry	County Down	Roman Catholic
St. Michael's Primary School, Newtownhamilton	Newtownhamilton	County Down	Roman Catholic
St. Moninna's Primary School	Newry	County Down	Roman Catholic
St. Naile's Primary School	Enniskillen	County Fermanagh	Roman Catholic
St. Nicholas' Primary School, Ardglass	Ardglass	County Down	Roman Catholic
St. Nicholas' Primary School, Carrickfergus	Carrickfergus	County Antrim	Roman Catholic
St. Ninnidh's Primary School	Enniskillen	County Fermanagh	Roman Catholic
St. Olcan's Primary School	Armoy	County Antrim	Roman Catholic
St. Oliver Plunkett Primary School	Belfast	County Antrim	Roman Catholic
St. Oliver Plunkett Primary School	Beragh	County Tyrone	Roman Catholic
St. Oliver Plunkett Primary School	Forkhill	County Down	Roman Catholic
St. Oliver Plunkett Primary School	Loughgall	County Armagh	Roman Catholic
St. Oliver Plunkett Primary School	Strathfoyle	County Londonderry	Roman Catholic
St. Oliver Plunkett Primary School	Toomebridge	County Antrim	Roman Catholic
St. Oliver's Primary School	Newtownhamilton	County Down	Roman Catholic
St. Patrick's & St. Brigid's Primary School	Ballycastle	County Antrim	Roman Catholic
St. Patrick's & St. Joseph's Primary School	Garvagh	County Londonderry	Roman Catholic
St. Patrick's Primary School, Aghacommon	Aghacommon	County Armagh	Roman Catholic
St. Patrick's Primary School, Armagh	Armagh	County Armagh	Roman Catholic
St. Patrick's Primary School, Aghagallon	Aghagallon	County Armagh	Roman Catholic
St. Patrick's Primary School, Augher	Augher	County Tyrone	Roman Catholic
St. Patrick's Primary School, Ballynahinch	Ballynahinch	County Down	Roman Catholic
St. Patrick's Primary School, Belfast	Belfast	County Antrim	Roman Catholic
St. Patrick's Primary School, Castlederg	Castlederg	County Tyrone	Roman Catholic
St. Patrick's Primary School, Coalisland	Coalisland	County Tyrone	Roman Catholic
St. Patrick's Primary School, Crossmaglen	Crossmaglen	County Down	Roman Catholic
St. Patrick's Primary School, Cullyhanna	Cullyhanna	County Down	Roman Catholic
St. Patrick's Primary School, Derry	Derry	County Londonderry	Roman Catholic
St. Patrick's Primary School, Derrygonnelly	Derrygonnelly	County Fermanagh	Roman Catholic
St. Patrick's Primary School, Downpatrick	Downpatrick	County Down	Roman Catholic
St. Patrick's Primary School, Dungannon	Dungannon	County Tyrone	Roman Catholic
St. Patrick's Primary School, Eskra	Eskra	County Tyrone	Roman Catholic
St. Patrick's Primary School, Garvary	Garvary	County Fermanagh	Roman Catholic
St. Patrick's Primary School, Gortin	Gortin	County Tyrone	Roman Catholic
St. Patrick's Primary School, Hilltown	Hilltown	County Down	Roman Catholic
St. Patrick's Primary School, Holywood	Holywood	County Down	Roman Catholic
St. Patrick's Primary School, Loughguile	Loughguile	County Antrim	Roman Catholic
St. Patrick's Primary School, The Loup	The Loup	County Londonderry	Roman Catholic
St. Patrick's Primary School, Maghera	Maghera	County Londonderry	Roman Catholic
St. Patrick's Primary School, Magheralin	Magheralin	County Armagh	Roman Catholic
St. Patrick's Primary School, Mayobridge	Mayobridge	County Down	Roman Catholic
St. Patrick's Primary School, Moneymore	Moneymore	County Londonderry	Roman Catholic
St. Patrick's Primary School, Newry	Newry	County Down	Roman Catholic
St. Patrick's Primary School, Newtownstewart	Newtownstewart	County Tyrone	Roman Catholic
St. Patrick's Primary School, Portaferry	Portaferry	County Down	Roman Catholic
St. Patrick's Primary School, Portrush	Portrush	County Antrim	Roman Catholic
St. Patrick's Primary School, Rasharkin	Rasharkin	County Antrim	Roman Catholic
St. Patrick's Primary School, Rathfriland	Rathfriland	County Down	Roman Catholic
St. Patrick's Primary School, Saul	Saul	County Down	Roman Catholic
St. Patrick's Primary School, Waterfoot	Waterfoot	County Antrim	Roman Catholic
St. Peter's Primary School, Belfast	Belfast	County Antrim	Roman Catholic
St. Peter's Primary School, Cabra	Cabra	County Down	Roman Catholic
St. Peter's Primary School, Galliagh	Galliagh	County Londonderry	Roman Catholic
St. Peter's Primary School, Irvinestown	Irvinestown	County Fermanagh	Roman Catholic
St. Peter's & St. Paul's Primary School	Dungiven	County Londonderry	Roman Catholic
St. Paul's Primary School, Belfast	Belfast	County Antrim	Roman Catholic
St. Paul's Primary School, Bessbrook	Bessbrook	County Antrim	Roman Catholic
St. Paul's Primary School, Moy	Moy	County Tyrone	Roman Catholic
St. Paul's Primary School, Moortown	Moortown	County Tyrone	Roman Catholic
St. Paul's Primary School, Plumbridge	Plumbridge	County Tyrone	Roman Catholic
St. Ronan's Primary School	Lisnaskea	County Fermanagh	Roman Catholic
St. Ronan's Primary School	Newry	County Down	Roman Catholic
St. Ronan's Recarson Primary School	Omagh	County Tyrone	Roman Catholic
St. Scire's Primary School	Trillick	County Tyrone	Roman Catholic
St. Teresa's Primary School, Belfast	Belfast	County Antrim	Roman Catholic
St. Teresa's Primary School, Lurgan	Lurgan	County Armagh	Roman Catholic
St. Teresa's Primary School, Mountnorris	Mountnorris	County Armagh	Roman Catholic
St. Teresa's Primary School, Sixmilecross	Sixmilecross	County Tyrone	Roman Catholic
St. Theresa's Primary School	Sion Mills	County Tyrone	Roman Catholic
St. Therese of Lisieux Primary School	Belfast	County Antrim	Roman Catholic
St. Therese Primary School	Galliagh	County Londonderry	Roman Catholic
St. Tierney's Primary School	Enniskillen	County Fermanagh	Roman Catholic
St. Trea's Primary School	Ballyronan	County Londonderry	Roman Catholic
St. Vincent de Paul Primary School	Belfast	County Antrim	Roman Catholic
Steelstown Primary School	Derry	County Londonderry	Roman Catholic
Stewartstown Primary School	Stewartstown	County Tyrone	Controlled
Strabane Primary School	Strabane	County Tyrone	Controlled
Straidbilly Primary School	Ballymoney	County Antrim	Controlled
Strandtown Primary School	Belfast	County Antrim	Controlled
Stranmillis Primary School	Belfast	County Antrim	Controlled
Sunnylands Primary School	Carrickfergus	County Antrim	Controlled
Tandragee Primary School	Tandragee	County Armagh	Controlled
Tannaghmore Primary School	Lurgan	County Armagh	Roman Catholic
Tattygar Primary School	Lisbellaw	County Fermanagh	Roman Catholic
Taughmonagh Primary School	Belfast	County Antrim	Controlled
Templepatrick Primary School	Templepatrick	County Antrim	Controlled
Tempo Primary School	Tempo	County Fermanagh	Controlled
Termoncanice Primary School	Limavady	County Londonderry	Roman Catholic
The Cope Primary School	Loughgall	County Armagh	Controlled
The Diamond Primary School	Cullybackey	County Antrim	Controlled
The Good Shepherd Primary School	Dunmurry	County Antrim	Roman Catholic
The Holy Family Primary School	Downpatrick	County Down	Roman Catholic
Thompson Primary School	Ballyclare	County Antrim	Controlled
Tildarg Primary School	Ballyclare	County Antrim	Controlled
Tobermore Primary School	Tobermore	County Londonderry	Controlled
Tonagh Primary School	Lisburn	County Antrim	Controlled
Toreagh Primary School	Larne	County Antrim	Controlled
Towerview Primary School	Bangor	County Down	Controlled
Tullygally Primary School	Lurgan	County Armagh	Controlled
Tummery Primary School	Dromore	County Tyrone	Controlled
Victoria Park Primary School	Belfast	County Antrim	Controlled
Victoria Primary School	Ballyhalbert	County Down	Controlled
Victoria Primary School	Carrickfergus	County Antrim	Controlled
Victoria Primary School	Newtownards	County Down	Controlled
Walker Memorial Primary School	Dungannon	County Tyrone	Controlled
Waringstown Primary School	Craigavon	County Armagh	Controlled
West Winds Primary School	Newtownards	County Down	Controlled
Wheatfield Primary School	Belfast	County Antrim	Controlled
Whiteabbey Primary School	Newtownabbey	County Antrim	Controlled
Whitehead Primary School	Whitehead	County Antrim	Controlled
Whitehouse Primary School	Newtownabbey	County Antrim	Controlled
William Pinkerton Memorial Primary School	Dervock	County Antrim	Controlled
Windmill Integrated Primary School	Dungannon	County Tyrone	Grant Maintained Integrated
Windsor Hill Primary School	Newry	County Down	Controlled
Woodburn Primary School	Carrickfergus	County Antrim	Controlled
Woodlawn Primary School	Carrickfergus	County Antrim	Controlled
Woods Primary School	Magherafelt	County Londonderry	Controlled

== See also ==
- List of Irish medium nurseries in Northern Ireland
- List of Irish medium primary schools in Northern Ireland
- List of Irish medium secondary schools in Northern Ireland
- List of integrated schools in Northern Ireland
- List of grammar schools in Northern Ireland
- Gaelscoil
