= List of grammar schools in Northern Ireland =

This is a list of all 65 grammar schools operating in Northern Ireland.

Name	Location	County	Type
Abbey Christian Brothers' Grammar School	Newry	Down	Voluntary Grammar
Antrim Grammar School	Antrim	Antrim	Controlled Grammar
Aquinas Diocesan Grammar School	Belfast	Antrim	Voluntary Grammar
Assumption Grammar School	Ballynahinch	Down	Voluntary Grammar
Ballyclare High School	Ballyclare	Antrim	Controlled Grammar
Ballymena Academy	Ballymena	Antrim	Voluntary Grammar
Banbridge Academy	Banbridge	Down	Controlled Grammar
Bangor Grammar School	Bangor	Down	Voluntary Grammar
Belfast High School	Newtownabbey	Antrim	Voluntary Grammar
Belfast Royal Academy	Belfast	Antrim	Voluntary Grammar
Bloomfield Collegiate School	Belfast	Down	Controlled Grammar
Cambridge House Grammar School	Ballymena	Antrim	Controlled Grammar
Campbell College	Belfast	Down	Voluntary Grammar
Carrickfergus Grammar School	Carrickfergus	Antrim	Controlled Grammar
Christian Brothers Grammar School	Omagh	Tyrone	Voluntary Grammar
Coleraine Grammar School	Coleraine	Londonderry	Voluntary Grammar
Dalriada School	Ballymoney	Antrim	Voluntary Grammar
Dominican College Fortwilliam	Belfast	Antrim	Voluntary Grammar
Dominican College Portstewart	Portstewart	Londonderry	Voluntary Grammar
Down High School	Downpatrick	Down	Controlled Grammar
Enniskillen Royal Grammar School	Enniskillen	Fermanagh	Voluntary Grammar
Foyle College	Derry	Londonderry	Voluntary Grammar
Friends' School Lisburn	Lisburn	Down	Voluntary Grammar
Glenlola Collegiate School	Bangor	Down	Controlled Grammar
Grosvenor Grammar School	Belfast	Down	Controlled Grammar
Hunterhouse College	Belfast	Antrim	Voluntary Grammar
Larne Grammar School	Larne	Antrim	Voluntary Grammar
Lecale Trinity Grammar School	Downpatrick	Down	Voluntary Grammar
Limavady Grammar School	Limavady	Londonderry	Controlled Grammar
Loreto College	Coleraine	Londonderry	Voluntary Grammar
Loreto Grammar School	Omagh	Tyrone	Voluntary Grammar
Lumen Christi College	Derry	Londonderry	Voluntary Grammar
Lurgan College	Lurgan	Armagh	Controlled Grammar
Methodist College	Belfast	Antrim	Voluntary Grammar
Mount Lourdes Grammar School	Enniskillen	Fermanagh	Voluntary Grammar
Omagh Academy Grammar School	Omagh	Tyrone	Controlled Grammar
Our Lady and St Patrick's College	Belfast	Down	Voluntary Grammar
Our Lady's Grammar School	Newry	Down	Voluntary Grammar
Portadown College	Portadown	Armagh	Controlled Grammar
Rainey Endowed School	Magherafelt	Londonderry	Voluntary Grammar
Rathmore Grammar School	Belfast	Down	Voluntary Grammar
Regent House School	Newtownards	Down	Controlled Grammar
Royal Belfast Academical Institution (RBAI) (Inst)	Belfast	Antrim	Voluntary Grammar
The Royal School Armagh	Armagh	Armagh	Voluntary Grammar
Royal School Dungannon	Dungannon	Tyrone	Voluntary Grammar
Sacred Heart Grammar School	Newry	Down	Voluntary Grammar
St Colman's College	Newry	Down	Voluntary Grammar
St Columb's College	Derry	Londonderry	Voluntary Grammar
St Dominic's Grammar School for Girls	Belfast	Antrim	Voluntary Grammar
St Joseph's Grammar School	Donaghmore	Tyrone	Voluntary Grammar
St Louis Grammar School Ballymena	Ballymena	Antrim	Voluntary Grammar
St Louis Grammar School Kilkeel	Kilkeel	Down	Voluntary Grammar
St Malachy's College	Belfast	Antrim	Voluntary Grammar
St Mary's Christian Brothers' Grammar School	Belfast	Antrim	Voluntary Grammar
St Mary's Grammar School	Magherafelt	Londonderry	Voluntary Grammar
St Michael's College	Enniskillen	Fermanagh	Voluntary Grammar
St Patrick's Academy	Dungannon	Tyrone	Voluntary Grammar
St Patrick's Grammar School	Armagh	Armagh	Voluntary Grammar
Strabane Academy	Strabane	Tyrone	Controlled Grammar
Strathearn School	Belfast	Down	Voluntary Grammar
Sullivan Upper School	Holywood	Down	Voluntary Grammar
Thornhill College	Derry	Londonderry	Voluntary Grammar
Victoria College	Belfast	Down	Voluntary Grammar
Wallace High School	Lisburn	Down	Voluntary Grammar
Wellington College Belfast	Belfast	Down	Controlled Grammar

== Non-grammar schools using grammar level entry ==
School name	Location	County	Intake % (2025)	Type
Lagan College	Belfast	Down	35%	Grant Maintained Integrated
Slemish College	Ballymena	Antrim	35%	Grant Maintained Integrated
Strangford Integrated College	Carrowdore	Down	35%	Grant Maintained Integrated

The above 3 schools use grammar level entry for a percentage of all entrants in comparison to grammar schools where all entrants are accepted based on academic performance.

== See also ==
- List of Irish medium nurseries in Northern Ireland
- List of Irish medium primary schools in Northern Ireland
- List of Irish medium secondary schools in Northern Ireland
- List of Integrated Schools in Northern Ireland
- Gaelscoil
