= Dromore Central Primary School =

Coordinates: 54°24′49.68″N 6°9′7.92″W

Location
- Mossvale Road; Dromore; BT25 1DG; Dromore, Northern Ireland; United Kingdom

Information
- Type: Controlled Primary School
- Established: 1938
- School district: Banbridge District
- Oversight: Southern E.L.B.
- Principal: Heather Bentley
- Enrollment: 710 (2023/4)
- Colors: Green and red
- Website: https://www.dromorecentral.co.uk/

Dromore Central Primary School (colloquially referred to as "the Central") is a primary school located in Dromore, County Down, Northern Ireland. The original school building was built in 1938 and had approximately 700 pupils aged from 4–11 years in 28 classes. This building was replaced with a new multi-million pound purpose built campus on the Mossvale Road which opened in 2016. The school aims "to promote the all-round development of every pupil". It is within the Southern Education and Library Board area.

The old school building is now vacant and is situated on the main Dromore to Banbridge road, only 300 yards from the Market Square. The new school building is located about 1/4 mile from Market Square on the Mossvale Road. It consists of 25 modern classrooms and facilities including extensive outdoor playing areas and a large car park.

Since 2001, the compulsory school uniform has consisted of a green pullover, a red polo-shirt and grey trousers, this replaced a brown-yellow uniform which had been worn since the 1970s.

== History ==
The school, as it stands today and will hopefully be re used, was established in 1938 by the Down Education Authority, to replace the former Church of Ireland (Cathedral) School, which it neighboured, and the First Dromore Presbyterian Church School, as well as the Unitarian or Hunters' School. The school was extended to provide an extra block of classrooms and a dining hall with kitchen in 1979. Since, the school has seen the addition of mobile classrooms to help cope with the rising rolls. Prior to its present title, the school had been known as Dromore Public Elementary School, or simply the P.E. school.

== New Building ==
In August 2006, the Southern Education and Library Board announced it was 'pursuing' the acquisition of a site at Mossvale Road in Dromore, for a replacement school for the over-stretched Dromore Central Primary School. On 30 June 2007, the Tullymacarette Primary School sited 3 miles southwest of the town closed with all of its pupils being fed into Dromore Central, with the exception of those who desired to go to another school. The new school building was completed in 2016 and was officially opened by the then Prince of Wales and Duchess of Cornwall. The Dromore Town Centre Development Plan suggests that the existing site could be developed into a community centre or a hotel.

== See also ==
- List of primary schools in Northern Ireland
