= Castlereagh =

Castlereagh (/ˈkɑːsəlreɪ/ KAH-səl-ray) may refer to:

== People ==
- Marquess of Londonderry, subsidiary title Viscount Castlereagh, used as courtesy title for the Marquess's eldest son; in particular
  - Robert Stewart, Viscount Castlereagh (1769–1822), later 2nd Marquess of Londonderry: Anglo-Irish statesman and British Foreign Secretary.

== Places ==
In Northern Ireland:

- Castlereagh (borough), a former local government district near Belfast
- Castlereagh (County Down townland) which gives its name to the borough
- Castlereagh (County Down barony), latterly divided into
  - Castlereagh Upper and
  - Castlereagh Lower

In the Republic of Ireland:

- County Mayo: townlands in two baronies:
  - Castlereagh, Clanmorris, Crossboyne parish
  - Castlereagh, Tirawley, Killala parish
- Castlereagh, County Offaly, townland in Lemanaghan parish, Garrycastle barony
- County Roscommon:
  - Castlerea, town
  - Castlereagh (County Roscommon barony), around the town
  - Castlereagh (County Roscommon townland), townland around the town
- Castlereagh, County Waterford, townland in Kilronan parish, Glenahiry barony

In Australia:

- Castlereagh, New South Wales, a suburb of Sydney
- Castlereagh River, two rivers
- Castlereagh Highway, a New South Wales state highway
- Castlereagh Street, a street in CBD Sydney

Other places:

- Castlereagh, Nova Scotia, a former village on the Bass River in Nova Scotia, Canada
- Castlereagh Dam and Reservoir, in Nuwara Eliya district, Sri Lanka

== Other uses ==
- The Castlereagh (Gilgandra), an early-20th-century newspaper in New South Wales, Australia
