= St Joseph's Grammar School =

Location
- Donaghmore, County Tyrone; Northern Ireland

Information
- Motto: "A Proud Past, A Better Future"
- Religious affiliation(s): Roman Catholic
- Local authority: Education Authority (Western)
- Principal: Geraldine Donnelly
- Gender: Male/Female
- Age: 11 to 18
- Enrolment: 800
- Colour(s)
- Website: stjosephsdonaghmore.com

St. Joseph's Grammar School is a voluntary grammar school for students in Donaghmore, County Tyrone, Northern Ireland. The teaching age range is 11–18. The school provides the option of sixth form after pupils finish year 12.

== History ==
The school was established in 1922 by the Daughters of the Cross.

== Academics ==
The school teaches a range of subjects, such as ICT, Art and design, Music and Irish language. It has an Irish medium stream (Sruth Na Gaeilge) in which 50% of the curriculum is taught through the Irish language. 170 pupils are enrolled in this stream.

In 2017/18, 99% of its students who entered achieved five or more GCSEs at grades A* to C, including the core subjects English and Maths. It was ranked 15th out of 188 schools in terms of its GCSE performance. Also in 2017/18, 86.1% of its entrants to the A-level exam achieved A*-C grades. It was ranked 21 out of 159 schools.

== See also ==
- List of Schools in Northern Ireland
- List of grammar schools in Northern Ireland
- List of secondary schools in Northern Ireland
