= Old Town Hall, Banbridge =

Municipal Building in Banbridge, Northern Ireland

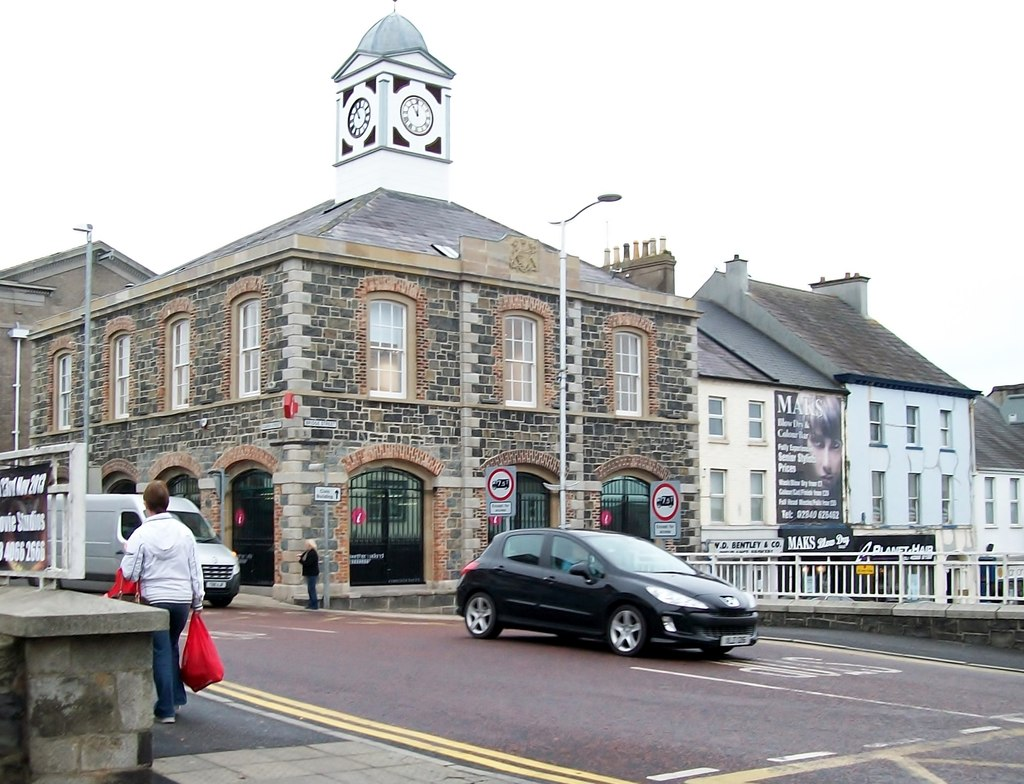
- Old Town Hall, Banbridge

- Shown in Northern Ireland
- 54.3489°N 6.2703°W
- Location: Scarva Street, Banbridge

History
- Built: 1834

Site notes
- Architect: Michael McGavigan
- Architectural style: Neoclassical style

Listed Building – Grade B1
- Official name: Market Hall
- Designated: 25 October 1977
- Reference no.: HB 17/06/009

The Old Town Hall is a municipal structure in Scarva Street in Banbridge, County Down, Northern Ireland. The structure, which currently accommodates a Community Advice Centre on the ground floor and a room for local community groups on the first floor, is a Grade B1 listed building.

== History ==
The current building was commissioned to replace an earlier market hall which was demolished to facilitate the construction of "The Cut", an underpass on the main road between Newry and Belfast. The Marquess of Downshire agreed to pay for a new building and civic leaders selected a site, just to the northwest of the old building, which had been occupied by the Bunch of Grapes Inn.

The new building was designed by Michael McGavigan in the neoclassical style, built in rough stone at a cost of £2,000 and was completed in 1834. It was arcaded on the ground floor, so that markets could be held, with an assembly hall on the first floor. The design involved a symmetrical main frontage with three bays facing onto Bridge Street; the arched openings on the ground floor containing wrought-iron grills and there were round-headed sash windows on the first floor; the central bay, which slightly projected forward, featured a sandstone parapet bearing the Downshire coat of arms and the year of completion. There was a clock turret at roof level.

The area was advanced to the status of an urban district with the town hall as its headquarters in 1899. The town hall continued to serve as the meeting place of Banbridge Urban District Council for much of the 20th century but ceased to be the local seat of government when the enlarged Banbridge District Council was established at Avonmore House in Church Square shortly after it was formed in 1973. The town hall was subsequently converted for use as the local Electricity Board offices and then became the local offices of Citizens Advice. The building was badly damaged on 15 March 1982, when a Provisional Irish Republican Army bomb was detonated on Bridge Street killing a schoolboy and injuring 36 people, and was harmed a second time on 1 August 1998, when a Real Irish Republican Army bomb was detonated on Newry Street, injuring 33 civilians and two Royal Ulster Constabulary officers.

A programme of refurbishment works costing £126,000, which included the installation of a modern heating and power system and the replacement of the roof, was completed in 2012. The building was subsequently re-opened as the local tourist information office but with a meeting room available on the first floor for the use local community groups including the Banbridge Historical Society.
