= Dromore Town Hall =

Municipal Building in Dromore, Northern Ireland

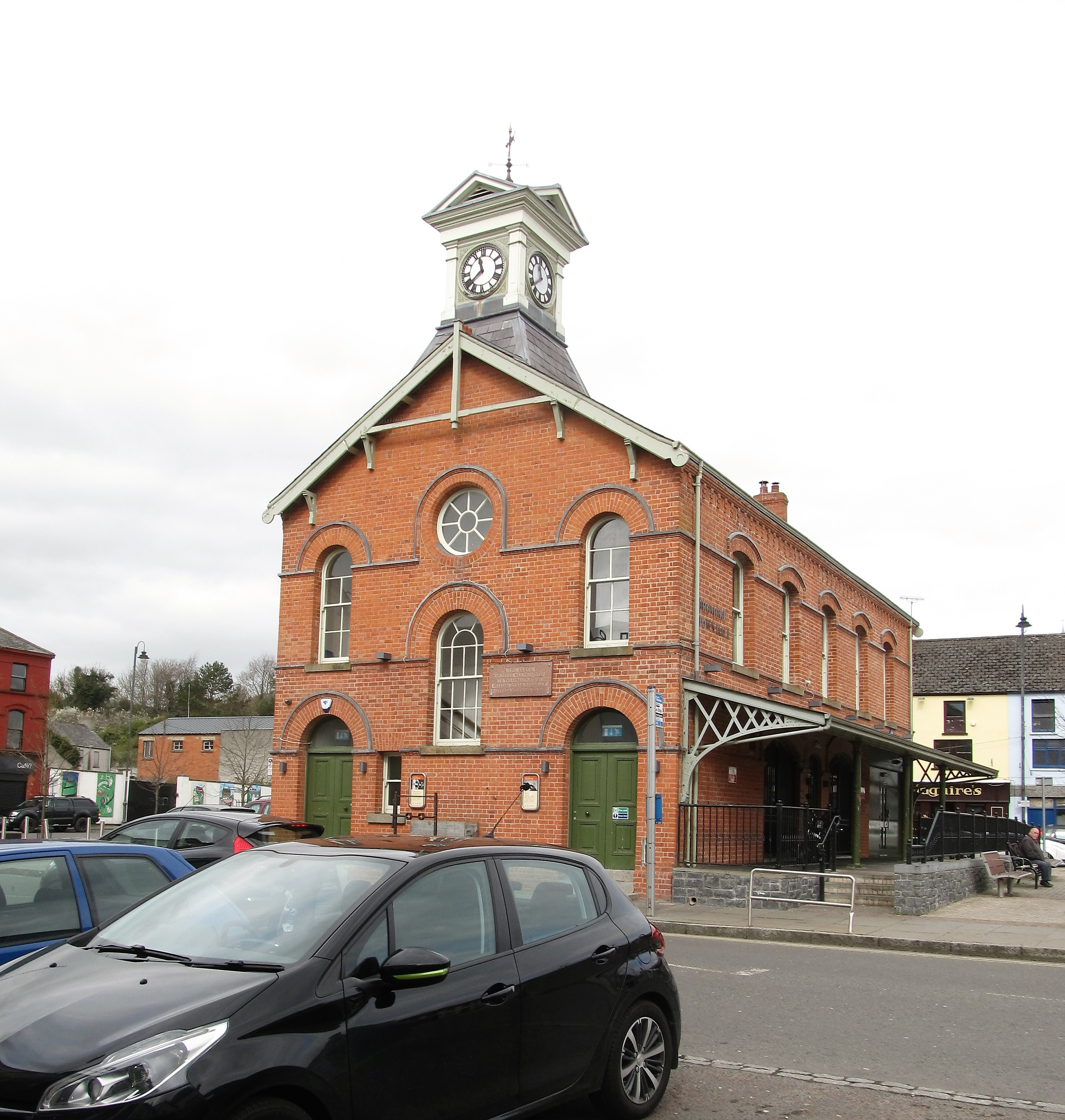
- Dromore Town Hall

- Shown in Northern Ireland
- 54.4145°N 6.1490°W
- Location: Market Square, Dromore

History
- Built: 1886

Site notes
- Architectural style: Victorian style

Listed Building – Grade B1
- Designated: 25 October 1977
- Reference no.: HB 17/15/010

Dromore Town Hall is a municipal structure in the centre of Dromore, County Down, Northern Ireland. The structure, which is now used as a public library, is a Grade B1 listed building.

== History ==
The first municipal building in the town was a market hall in the Market Square which was completed in 1732. By the mid-19th century, it had become "dirty looking building" and the town commissioners decided to demolish it and to erect a new structure on the same site. The new building was designed in the Victorian style, built by a local contractor, J. H. Burns, in red brick and was completed in 1886.

The design involved a symmetrical main frontage with three bays facing the south side of the Market Square; the central bay featured a round headed window with voussoirs and hood moulds at mezzanine level with an oculus in the gable above. The outer bays featured round headed doorways with voussoirs and hood moulds on the ground floor and round headed windows with voussoirs and hood moulds on the first floor. The side elevations featured wide segmental headed openings on the ground floor and segmental headed windows with voussoirs and hood moulds on the first floor. At roof level, there was a central turret with a pedimented roof and a weather vane.

A local philanthropist, William Cowan Heron, who also provided the funds for the local cottage hospital, paid for a clock which was inserted into the roof turret by Berringer Brothers of Belfast in 1891. Heron also paid for the town hall bell which was cast by Matthew Byrne at the Fountain Head Bell Foundry in Dublin.

After the area became an urban district in 1899, the new council used the building for its meetings. Significant public events included a controversial debate in November 1936 when the trade unionist and politician, Harry Midgley, talked about the Spanish Civil War, urging support for the left-wing government of Spanish Republic and strongly criticising the Catholic Church for its support for the Nationalists led by General Francisco Franco. During the Second World War murals were painted on the building as part of fund raising events held during Warship Week in 1941, Wings for Victory Week in 1943 and Salute the Soldier Week in 1944.

At the north end of the building a new two-storey wing, which extended the structure to the west, was completed in the mid-20th century. The building continued to serve as the meeting place of the urban district council for much of the 20th century, but ceased to be the local seat of government when the enlarged Banbridge District Council was formed in 1973. It was subsequently converted for use as a public library. A programme of works costing £1.4 million to improve the area around the town hall was undertaken by the contractor, F. P. McCann, and completed in spring 2021.
