= List of Irish medium primary schools in Northern Ireland =

This is a list of primary schools in Northern Ireland in which education is primarily conducted in Irish. There are 39 listed below and in each of the 6 counties, in descending order, there are: 11 in Antrim (Antroim), with 9 in Belfast (Béal Feriste) alone, 10 in Tyrone (Tír Eoghan), 8 in Londondderry (Doire ), 5 in Down (An Dún) 4 in Armagh (Ard Mhaca) 1 in Fermanagh (Fear Manach).

== Antrim ==
- Bunscoil an Chaistil, Ballycastle
- Gaelscoil Ghleann Darach, Crumlin

== Armagh ==
- Bunscoil Ard Mhacha
- Bunscoil Eoin Baiste, Portadown
- Bunscoil Naomh Proinsias, Lurgan
- Gaelscoil Phádraig Naofa

== Belfast ==
- Bunscoil an tSléibhe Dhuibh
- Bunscoil Bheann Mhadagáin
- Bunscoil Mhic Reachtain
- Bunscoil Phobal Feirste
- Gaelscoil an Lonnáin
- Gaelscoil na bhFál
- Scoil an Droichid
- Scoil na Fuiseoige
- Scoil na Seolta
- Gaelscoil na Móna

== Down ==
- Bunscoil an Iúir, Newry
- Bunscoil Phádraig & Mhuire, Downpatrick
- Gaelscoile Bheanna Boirche, Castlewellan
- Gaelscoil na mBeann, Kilkeel

== Fermanagh ==
- Bunscoil an Traonaigh, Lisnaskea

== Londonderry ==
- Bunscoil Cholmcille
- Bunscoil Naomh Bríd, Maghera
- Gaelscoil Neachtain, Dungiven
- Gaelscoil an tSeanchaí, Magherafelt
- Gaelscoil Léim an Mhadaidh, Limavady
- Gaelscoil Éadain Mhóir
- Gaelscoil na Speiríní, Magherafelt
- Gaelscoil na Daróige, Derry

== Tyrone ==
- Bunscoil Naomh Colmcille, Carrickmore
- Gaelscoil na Deirge, Castlederg
- Gaelscoil na gCrann, Omagh
- Gaelscoil Mhuire
- Gaelscoil Uí Dhochartaigh, Strabane
- Gaelscoil Uí Néill, Coalisland
- Gaelscoil Eoghain, Cookstown
- Gaelscoil na Deirge, Castlederg
- Gaelscoil Aodha Rua, Dungannon
- Gaelscoil Naomh Phádraig, Gortin

== See also ==
- List of Irish medium nurseries in Northern Ireland
- List of Irish medium secondary schools in Northern Ireland
- Gaelscoil
- List of primary schools in Northern Ireland
- List of grammar schools in Northern Ireland
- List of secondary schools in Northern Ireland
- List of integrated schools in Northern Ireland
