= Ballynagalliagh =

Townland in County Londonderry, Northern Ireland

- Townland
- Location within Northern Ireland
- Coordinates: 55°02′11″N 7°20′03″W
- Country: United Kingdom
- Province: Northern Ireland
- County: Londonderry

Ballynagalliagh (Irish: Baile na gCailleach, meaning 'townland of the nuns') is a townland in County Londonderry, Northern Ireland. It lies within Derry and Strabane district.

Upper and Lower Galliagh form the townland of Ballynagalliagh in western County Londonderry. Upper Galliagh borders the townland of Elagh More which lies directly upon the border with County Donegal, between the Buncrana Road and Ballyarnett. Lower Galliagh is a buffer between Upper Galliagh and the outer urban edge of Derry and the townland of Shantallow. The boundary of lower Galliagh is the burn which runs behind the White Chapel at Galliagh estate.

The townland has been zoned for large scale housing and commercial development in the Derry Area Plan 2011. The completion of the Skeoge Link in 2008 has allowed for some 3,000 new homes to be built in the area.

== History ==
Ballynagalligh is recorded in the 1604 Irish patent rolls of James I. It lies in the parish of Templemore, within the barony of the North West Liberties of Londonderry.

Galliagh comes from the Irish Calliagh/Galliagh which translates as either "nuns" or "old hags". The area may originally have been called Clongoliagh or Glengalliagh. The anglicised name is appropriately Glenabbey.
