= Anna Hassan =

British educator

Dame Anna Patricia Lucy Hassan, DBE (née Fusco; born 1946, Northern Ireland) is a British educator. She is Consultant Head at Daubeney Primary School, and a former Executive Head of Millfields Community School (Hilsea Street, Hackney, London).

== Teaching career ==
1963: Trains at Coloma College, West Wickham, Kent (a Catholic teacher training school)
1967: Starts teaching at St Joseph's Primary School in Southwark, London
1979: Works in schools throughout Hackney after taking a break to raise her son
1983: Appointed deputy head at Grasmere School, Hackney; later named headteacher
1993: Invited to take charge of Millfields
2009: Retires from Millfields and takes up consultancy

== Millfields ==
Hassan was credited with turning the Millfields Community School, one of London's worst-performing schools, around academically, although it took a dozen years.

== Biography ==
Anna Patricia Lucy Fusco was born and raised in Banbridge, County Down, Northern Ireland, by Italian parents, where she initially went into the family business managing a small chain of ice-cream parlours, then soon after took up her calling as a teacher. A Roman Catholic, she is married to Nevzat Hassan, a Turkish Cypriot Muslim, and has been since 1971; they have one son, Dogan (born 1972, London).

== Honours ==
In 2005, Hassan received an honorary fellowship from the University of Gloucestershire. The following year, in 2006, for her service to education, Hassan was created a Dame Commander of the Order of the British Empire.
