= Drew Nelson (politician) =

Northern Irish solicitor and politician

Drew Nelson (3 August 1956 – 10 October 2016) was a Northern Irish solicitor and politician. He was the Grand Secretary of the Grand Orange Lodge of Ireland from 2005 to 2016.

== Biography ==
Nelson grew up on a family farm in the town land of Listullycurran, Dromore, County Down. He went on to study at Wallace High School and then to Queen's University Belfast and attained his Bachelor of Laws in 1981. He set up his own law practice two years after graduation.

He joined the Ulster Defence Regiment (UDR) while studying at Queen's University Belfast in 1977 and rose to the rank of Lieutenant. One such incident that led him to joining the Security Forces was on 7 April 1976, when three members of the Herron family from Dromore were murdered by the IRA in their drapery store. William Herron, who was murdered along with his wife and daughter, was a member of a local Dromore Orange Lodge. The murder of the Herons encouraged Drew down the path of military service and eventually politics. It was one reason, of many, why he was so eager to serve his country and in later years to fight for the innocent victims of terrorism. He left the UDR on entering politics in 1989.

He was a former District Master of Lower Iveagh District in County Down and a member of Listullycurran LOL 616, in which he served as Secretary until his death. He was also a member of the Royal Black Institution.

In the 1992 general election, Nelson was selected by the South Down constituency of the Ulster Unionist Party to succeed Enoch Powell as parliamentary candidate. He lost to the incumbent, Social Democratic and Labour Party candidate Eddie McGrady by 6,000 votes. In 1989, he topped the poll in Dromore DEA and was elected to Banbridge District Council. He retained his seat in 1993 and went on to become Chairman of the Council before standing down in 1997. In 1996, he was fourth on the UUP list for election to the Northern Ireland Forum in South Belfast He supported John Taylor in his bid to replace James Molyneaux as Leader in 1995. In 2004, he left the UUP. The following year, he became Grand Secretary of the Orange Institution.

During his period of office, Nelson was part of Orange delegations which met with senior political and civic figures, including successive British First Ministers and Secretary of States, United States ambassadors, Irish Taoiseach Enda Kenny, former Irish President Mary McAleese, Seán Cardinal Brady, SDLP members, and others.

Nelson held a keen interest in local history as well as interests in the plight of French Protestants, the Huguenots, and the Reformation. He was a keen traveler, being a regular visitor to France to trace the plight of the Huguenots, and other parts of Europe where there were once Protestant minorities persecuted for their faith.

== Death ==
Nelson died on 10 October 2016, following a short illness, aged 60.

== Political stances ==
In 1996, Nelson expressed support for the UUP ending or reforming its link with the Orange Order in an attempt to broaden its appeal, for which he was heckled.

He supported power sharing with the SDLP in a devolved unitary legislature, but opposed the 1998 Belfast Agreement.
