= Killowen Primary School =

Killowen Primary School may refer to:

- Killowen Primary School (Coleraine), County Londonderry, Northern Ireland
- Killowen Primary School (Killowen), Killowen, County Down, Northern Ireland
