= All Saints' Primary School =

All Saints' Primary School may refer to:

== Malaysia ==
- All Saints' National Primary School, Taiping, Perak

== Northern Ireland ==
- All Saints' Primary School, Ballela, Ballela, County Down, Northern Ireland
- All Saints' Primary School, Ballymena, Ballymena, County Antrim, Northern Ireland

== South Australia ==
- All Saints' Primary School, Seaford, Seaford, South Australia
