= Dromore, County Down =

Town and civil parish in County Down, Northern Ireland

Coordinates: 54.415°N 6.149°W

Dromore: Irish: Droim Mór
- Town
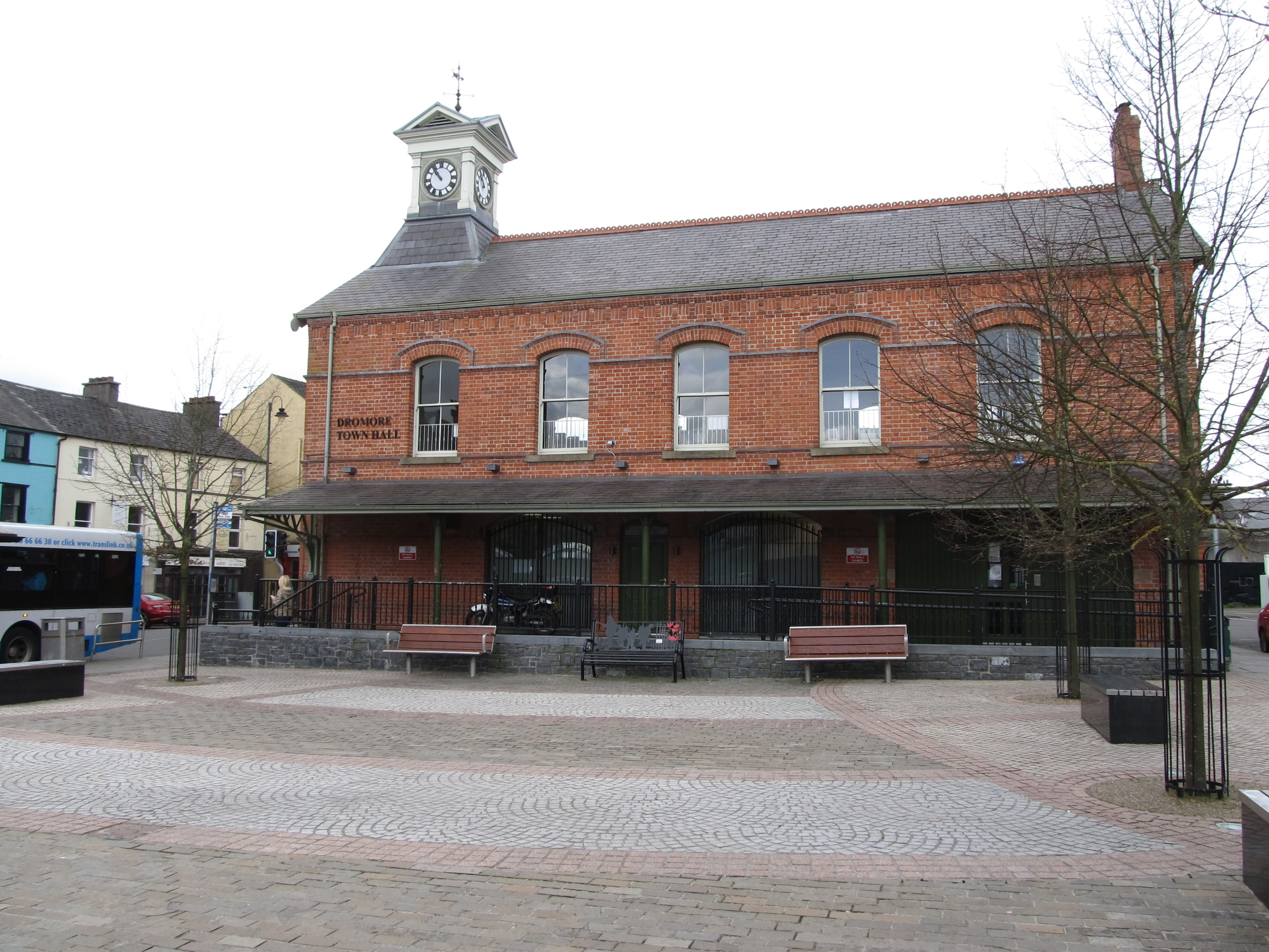
- Dromore Town Hall

- Location within County Down
- Population: 6,492 (2021 census)
- Irish grid reference: J201533
  - Belfast: 19 miles (31 km)
- District: Armagh, Banbridge and Craigavon
- County: County Down
- Country: Northern Ireland
- Sovereign state: United Kingdom
- Post town: Dromore
- Postcode district: BT25
- Dialling code: 028
- Police: Northern Ireland
- Fire: Northern Ireland
- Ambulance: Northern Ireland
- UK Parliament: Lagan Valley

Dromore (from Irish Droim Mór, meaning 'large ridge') is a market town and civil parish in County Down, Northern Ireland, situated on the River Lagan. It lies within the local government district of Armagh City, Banbridge and Craigavon, about 19 miles (31 km) southwest of Belfast, on the A1 Belfast–Dublin road. The 2021 census recorded a population of 6,492.

The town's centre is Market Square, which has a rare set of stocks. It is in the old linen manufacturing district. Dromore has the remains of a castle and earthworks, although these have modern buildings surrounding them, a large motte and bailey or encampment (known locally as "the Mound"), and an earlier earthwork known as the Priest's Mount on the Maypole Hill.

== History ==
The name Dromore is an anglicisation of the Irish Druim Mór (modern Irish Droim Mór) meaning "large ridge", with historic anglicisations including Drumore, Drummore and Drummor.

The town features a well-preserved Norman motte and bailey that was constructed by John de Courcy in the early 13th century, shortly after the Norman invasion of Ireland. Known locally as "the Mound", the fort occupies a prominent site to the east of the town centre and has views along the valley of the River Lagan. Dromore remained under Anglo-Norman control until it was captured and destroyed by Edward Bruce during the Irish-Bruce wars of 1315.

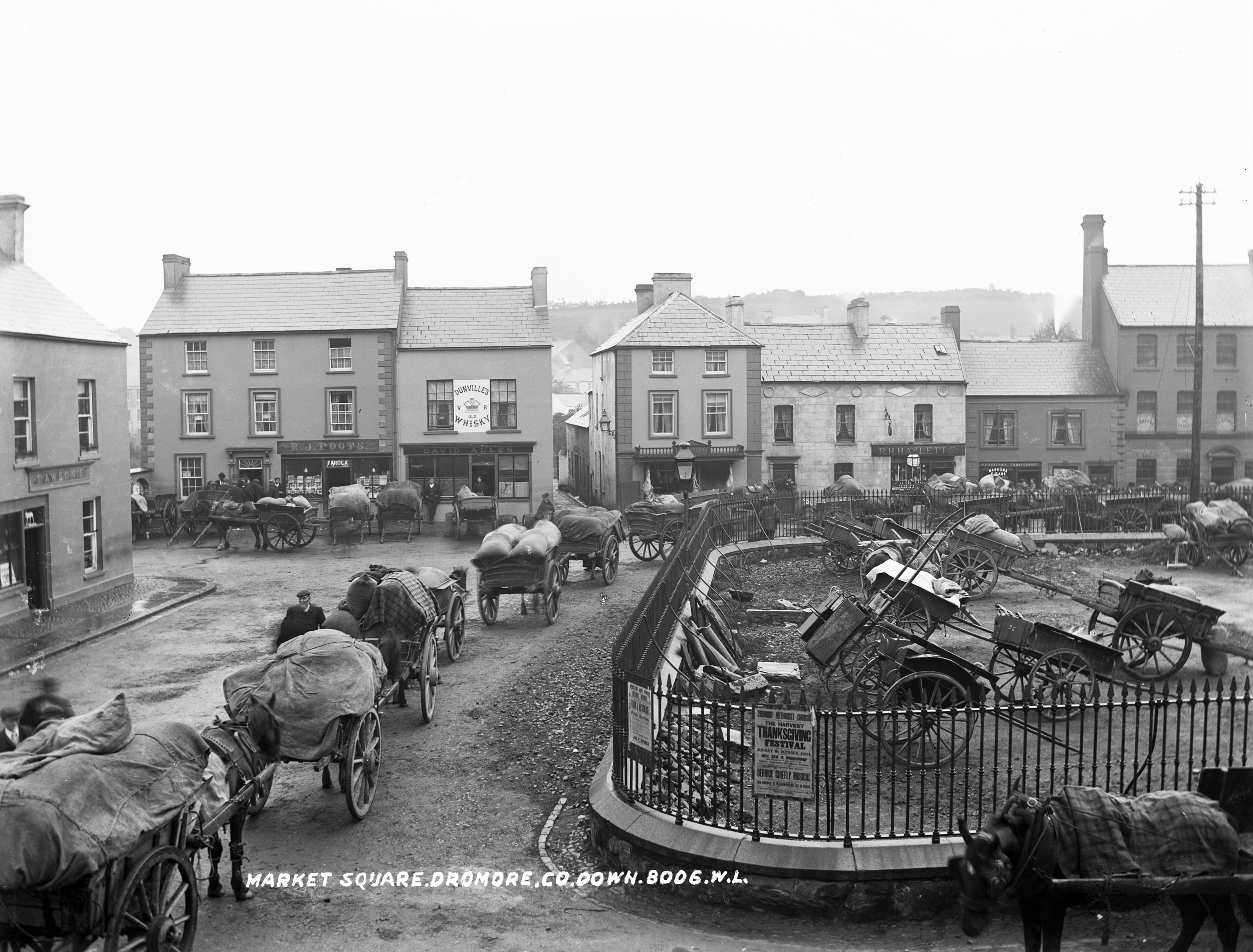
Dromore market square in 1904

It is the traditional seat of the Bishop of Dromore. The diocese grew out of an abbey of Canons Regular attributed to Saint Colman in the 6th century. Since the Reformation, both the Church of Ireland and the Catholic Church in Ireland have claimed to inherit the ancient diocese. The Church of Ireland diocese, which retained the historical cathedral and diocesan property, was united in 1842 with the Diocese of Down and Connor. The Diocese of Connor left the union in 1945, with the Diocese of Down and Dromore remaining united. The bishops of the Roman Catholic Diocese of Dromore moved to Newry no later than 1833, and subsequently built Newry Cathedral.

The town and cathedral were wholly destroyed during the Irish Rebellion of 1641, and the present cathedral was built by Bishop Jeremy Taylor in 1661, who is buried there. Also buried in the cathedral is Thomas Percy, another famous bishop of the diocese, who laid out the fine grounds of the palace. A monument to Thomas Percy stands in the Town Park.

The population at the time of the 1841 census was 2,110 inhabitants.

Jacobites under command of Richard Hamilton, and rival Williamites fought a battle here on 14 March 1689. The battle took place about a mile out of the town on the Milebush Road and was known as the Break of Dromore. The Jacobites routed the Williamites and they fled in disorder, leaving 400 dead. After this Break of Dromore the Jacobites did not meet any resistance while advancing northwards and occupying Belfast.

Dromore had its own railway station from 1863 to 1956. The Banbridge, Lisburn and Belfast Junction Railway (BLB) through Dromore opened in 1863. Its line was a branch that joined the Ulster Railway main line Knockmore Junction, giving Dromore a direct link to Lisburn and Belfast Great Victoria Street. In 1876 the Ulster Railway became part of the new Great Northern Railway, which took over the BLB company in 1877. In 1953 the railway was nationalised as the GNR Board, which closed the line through Dromore on 29 April 1956.

On 23 July 1920, sectarian motivated riots occurred in Dromore. An estimated crowd of 500 attacked Catholic homes, businesses and the Catholic parochial house. During the rioting, one member of the Orange Order was shot dead, it was determined that the bullet had been fired by the police.

=== The Troubles ===
1976

7 April 1976 – William Herron (64), Elizabeth Herron (58) and their daughter, Noleen Herron (26), all Protestant civilians, were killed during a Provisional Irish Republican Army incendiary bomb attack on their drapery shop on Market Square, Dromore. They lived in the flat above the shop.

1988

6 July 1988 – Terence Delaney (31), a Catholic civilian, was shot dead by the Ulster Freedom Fighters, a cover name used by the Ulster Defence Association, while waiting for a lift to work.

=== Today ===
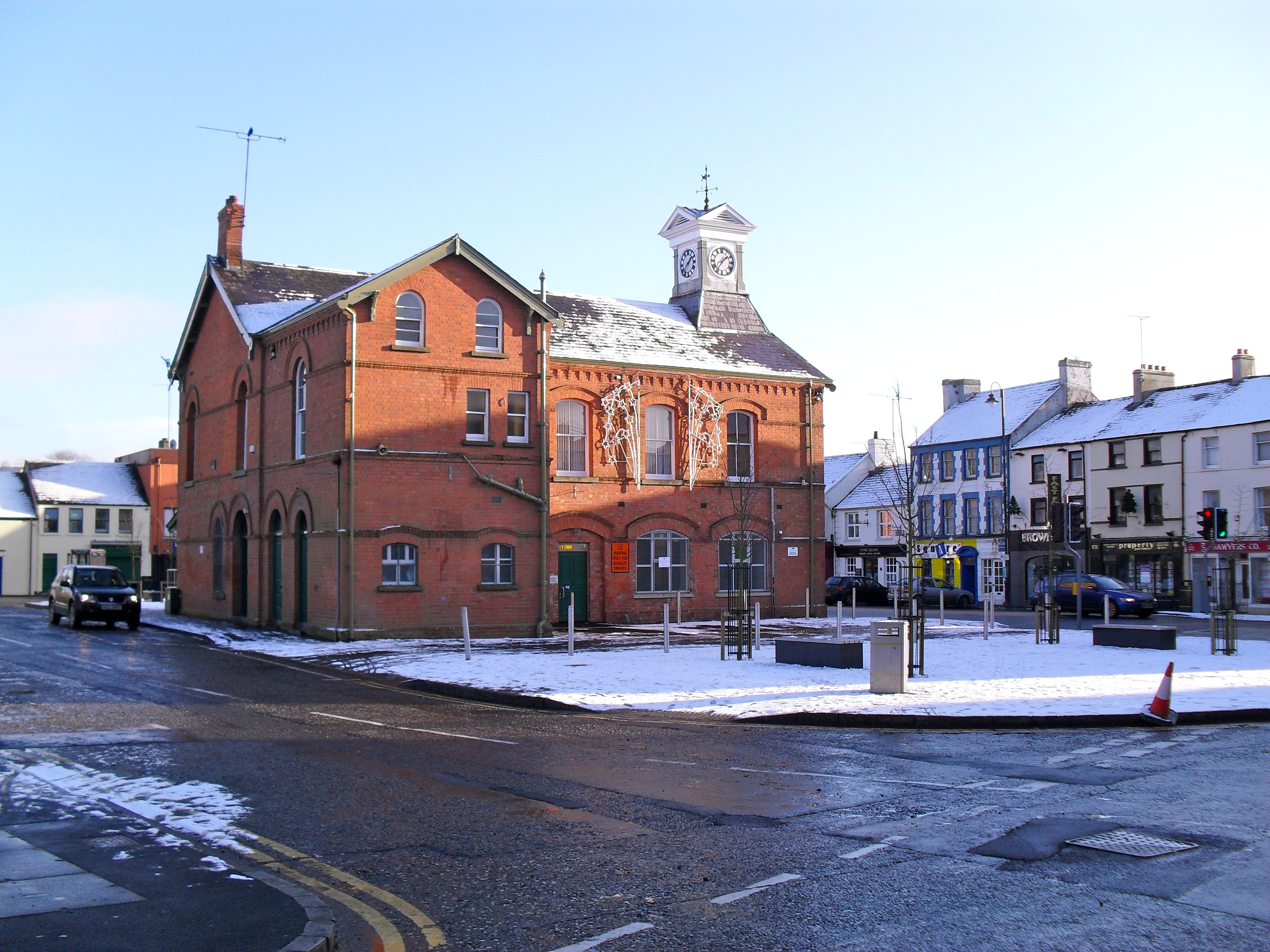
Dromore Town Hall

The Dromore Town Centre Development Plan, published in July 2003, outlined that of the 190 units within Dromore Town Centre, over one quarter were vacant. This is in spite of recent population growth in the town; a result of the proximity to the A1 road and resultant commuting access to Greater Belfast.

The green-field development in recent years has mostly been around the edges of the town, and the doughnut effect has led to these houses being disconnected from the town centre. The population of Dromore tends to travel to nearby Banbridge or Sprucefield to shop, which has caused the high levels of obvious dereliction however more local shops are opening thus the number of people travelling beyond the town to shop is decreasing.

The plan highlights the under use of the River Lagan as a resource in the town, as well as the poorly used public space around Dromore Town Hall in the Market Square. The square's 18th Century layout is protected, however it is identified as a traffic problem, which is exacerbated by poor parking provision and enforcement of parking restrictions. In 2008, some of the buildings in the Market Square were cleared to facilitate the construction of leisure space.

== Demography ==
=== 2021 census ===
On census day (21 March 2021) there were 6,395 people living in Dromore. Of these:

- 68.9% belong to or were brought up in a 'Protestant and Other Christian (including Christian related)' religion and 16.51% belong to or were brought up in the Christian Catholic denomination
- 62.47% indicated that they had a British national identity, 42.05% had a Northern Irish national identity and 10.34% had an Irish national identity (respondents could indicate more than one national identity)

=== 2011 census ===
On census day (27 March 2011) there were 6,003 people living in Dromore (2,439 households), accounting for 0.33% of the NI total. The population increased 20.8% from the 2001 census figure of 4,968. Of these:

- 23.37% were aged under 16 years and 13.88% were aged 65 and over
- 52.17% of the usually resident population were female and 47.83% were male
- 75.81% belong to or were brought up in a 'Protestant and Other Christian (including Christian related)' religion and 15.89% belong to or were brought up in the Christian Catholic denomination
- 70.10% indicated that they had a British national identity, 31.53% had a Northern Irish national identity and 7.08% had an Irish national identity (respondents could indicate more than one national identity)
- 36 years was the average (median) age of the population
- 7.37% had some knowledge of Ulster-Scots and 3.18% had some knowledge of Irish (Gaelic).

== Transport ==
=== Road ===
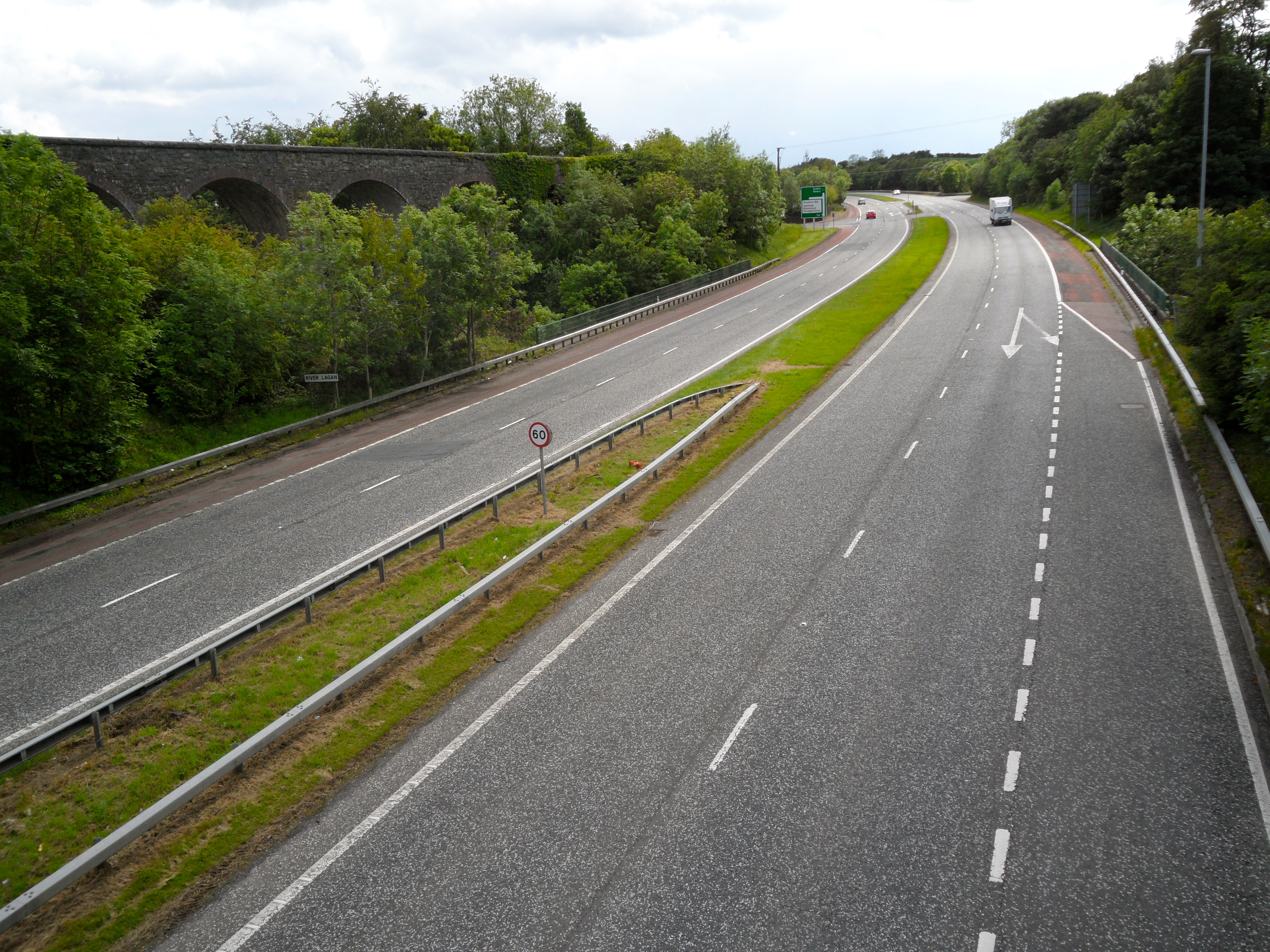
The A1 Dromore by-pass in 2011. The disused railway viaduct can be seen on the left

Dromore is well served by the Translink Goldline Express bus service 238, running between Belfast and Newry. Translink Ulsterbus service 38 links the town with Belfast, Banbridge and Lisburn (bypassed by express services). However the 38 can stop at all urban and rural bus stops, adding roughly an extra thirty minutes to the Belfast bound journey.

It is a short drive from Dromore to Belfast (about 20–25 minutes off-peak), Lisburn and Banbridge due to the high-quality A1 road/M1 motorway. Belfast International Airport is about 40 minutes away using the A26 (Moira-Antrim road) while Dublin Airport is around seventy to eighty minutes away using the A1/M1. The town, which has been on the main Belfast to Dublin route for centuries, was bypassed in 1972.

The area is also linked with Lurgan and Ballynahinch by the B2 Lurgan Road and B2 Ballynahinch Road respectively. Surrounding villages, such as Kinallen, Dromara and Donaghcloney, are served by unclassified rural routes.

In 2009 a grade-separated junction featuring an underpass was constructed at the junction of the B2 Banbridge Road, A1 dual-carriageway and the Rowantree Road. It was one of four junctions that were grade separated along the route as part of £30 million of safety improvements. It followed the successful construction of a similar style junction at the B2 Hillsborough Road/A1 junction on the northern end of the town.

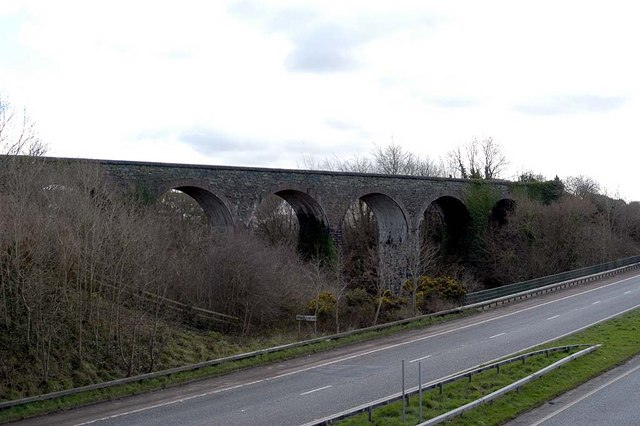
The imposing Dromore Viaduct on the Banbridge, Lisburn and Belfast Junction Railway.

=== Rail ===
Dromore was situated on the Banbridge, Lisburn and Belfast Junction Railway, part of the Great Northern Railway, which ran from Knockmore Junction to Banbridge.

Immediately to the west of Dromore Railway Station is the Dromore Viaduct, which once carried trains across the River Lagan. At 74 ft (22.6 m) tall and 7 arches long, the eye-catching viaduct was the most noteworthy piece of engineering on the line.

Having opened on 13 July 1863, Dromore Station, along with the rest of the line via Dromore to Banbridge and Newcastle, was closed under the auspices of the Ulster Transport Authority on 30 April 1956.

== Communications ==
The dialling code for Dromore, like the rest of Northern Ireland, is 028. Local landline numbers typically appear in the format 028 9269 xxxx. The town's local telephone exchange falls under the Lisburn telephone exchange code, which prior to the Big Number Change in 2000, used area code 01846.

== Townlands ==
Dromore sprang up within the townland of the same name. The following is a list of townlands that are now within the town's urban area, alongside their likely etymologies:

- Balleny, historically Ballyeany (from Irish Baile Uí Éinigh, meaning 'O'Heaney's townland')
- Ballymacormick (from Irish Baile Mhic Cormaic, meaning 'MacCormick's townland')
- Ballymaganlis, historically Ballymagarly (from Irish Baile Mhig Amhalaidh, meaning 'MacAwley's townland')
- Ballyvicknacally (from Irish Baile Mhic na Caillí, meaning 'townland of the hag's son')
- Drumbroneth, historically Drumbrony, Drumfrony (from Irish Druim Bróncha/Bhrónaí, meaning 'Brónach's ridge')
- Lurganbane (from Irish Lorgain Bhán, meaning 'long white ridge')

== People ==
Past and present notable residents include:

- Jeffrey Donaldson, former Lagan Valley MP and leader of the DUP
- Harry Ferguson (1884–1960), inventor who made the tractor practical
- Sir Clarence Graham, Bt., former Ulster Unionist Party politician
- Melissa Hamilton, ballet dancer
- Tyrone Howe, Irish rugby international and former local UUP Councillor
- David Humphreys, Irish rugby international
- John Leslie (1814–1897), first-class cricketer
- Drew Nelson (1956–2016), former Grand Secretary of the Orange Order
- Sam Ferris, Olympic marathon runner
- John Frazer (1827 – 1884), Irish-born Australian businessman and politician.

== Education ==
- Primary Schools
  - Dromore Central Primary School: opened 1938
  - St. Colman's Primary School
- Secondary Schools
  - Dromore High School: opened 1958.
    formerly Dromore Secondary Intermediate School

== Sport ==
Despite the town's small population, Dromore has a multitude of sport teams and venues.

The most prominent sports in the town are association football and rugby union, with cycling, hockey, lawn bowls, and athletics having some popularity also.

=== Cycling ===
Dromore has a number of cycling clubs in the local area including Dromore Cycling Club, West Down Wheelers, and Dromara Cycling Club. The town is also home to a number of former national and international event winning cyclists including Terry Mackin, double silver medalist at the National Track Championships and a bronze medal in the Kilometre Time Trial event in the UCI World Masters Track Championships, Gareth Rogers, two time All Ireland Hill Climb Champion.

Seamus Downey competed in the individual road race event at the 1984 Summer Olympics, his son Sean Downey winning a bronze medal in the 2010 Commonwealth Games in the team pursuit as part of the Northern Ireland team and riding for the An Post–Chain Reaction team between 2012 and 2015, and Mark Downey competing at the 2015 UEC European Track Championships in the points race and team pursuit. Mark won the gold medal at the 2016–17 UCI Track Cycling World Cup, Round 2 in Apeldoorn in the points race. He also won the third round of the World Cup points race held in Cali, Colombia and picked up a Silver in the Madison with his teammate Felix English. Mark concluding his 2017 World Cup campaign by winning the Madison in Los Angeles Round 4 and was overall series winner in the points race.

=== Football ===
The town has one intermediate football team, Dromore Amateurs F.C., who compete in a regional league and play home matches at Ferris Park.

The football club currently runs a number of youth football teams. For the 2011/2012 season they have teams from the Under 8s and Under 9s playing in the Mid Ulster Youth League Games Development League, teams at Under 10s, Under 11s and Under 12s playing in the George Best Youth League, teams at Under 13s, Under 14s, Under 15s and Under 17s playing in the Mid Ulster Youth League plus a team at Under 16s playing in the Carnbane Youth Football League. The club is also affiliated to the 'Northern Ireland Boys Football Association' and enters teams into the N.I.B.F.A. Cup each season.

Football is also very popular as a social sport, with many groups playing on a daily basis at both municipal sports facilities at Ferris Park and Dromore Community Centre.

=== Rugby ===
Rugby union is represented through Dromore Rugby Football Club, who have had some success in recent years. The club are based on Barban Hill in the town and have three rugby pitches and a clubhouse on that site. The club's 1st XV team presently compete in the Ulster Branch of the IRFU's Qualifying League.

=== Ladies' hockey ===
The town is represented on a provincial level in ladies field hockey by Dromore Ladies Hockey Club, whose 1st XI competed in the Ulster Women's Hockey Union Senior One league for the 2010/11 season, having won the Ulster Women's Hockey Union "Club of the Year" title in 2007/8. The club have six senior teams and junior teams at all age levels, playing home matches and training at Ferris Park.

=== Gaelic Games ===
The Gaelic games of hurling and camogie are catered for at the Ballela Club in the nearby village of Ballela.

=== Facilities ===
The main sports facility in the town is Dromore Community Centre (also known as Holm Park), which offers two grass soccer pitches, two tennis courts and a bowling green. In addition to this, the main building contains a gymnasium, an indoor multipurpose hall and two squash courts (the squash courts are now closed for re-purposing). The secondary facility is Ferris Park, named after local Olympian Sam Ferris, which provides a full-sized sand-based floodlit hockey pitch, two floodlit tennis courts, a grass soccer pitch and a changing pavilion. Both are maintained by Armagh City, Banbridge and Craigavon Borough Council.

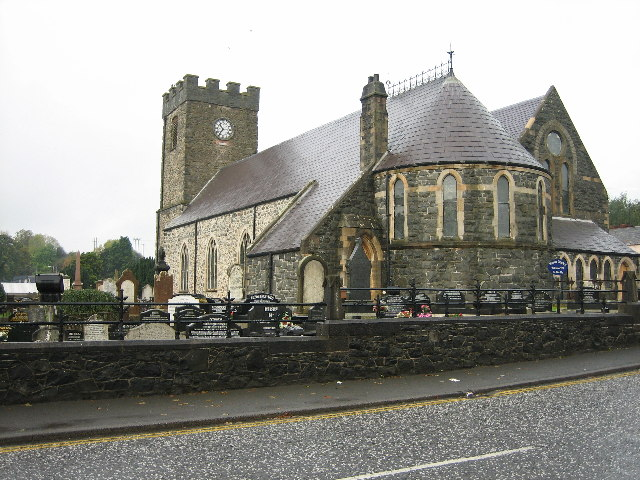
Dromore Cathedral

== Churches ==
- Banbridge Road (Ban Road) Presbyterian Church
- Dromore Baptist Church
- Dromore Cathedral
- Dromore Elim Pentecostal Church
- Dromore Free Presbyterian Church
- Dromore Reformed Presbyterian Church
- Dromore Methodist Church
- Dromore Non-Subscribing Presbyterian Church
- First Dromore Presbyterian Church
- St Colman's Catholic Church

== See also ==
- Dromore, County Down (civil parish)
- List of towns and villages in Northern Ireland
- List of localities in Northern Ireland by population
- Market houses in Northern Ireland

== Sources ==
- Baker, Michael H.C. (1972). Irish Railways since 1916. London: Ian Allan. ISBN 978-0-7110-0282-1.
- Hajducki, S. Maxwell (1974). A Railway Atlas of Ireland. Newton Abbott: David & Charles. ISBN 978-0-7153-5167-3.
