= The Castlereagh (Gilgandra) =

Former newspaper in New South Wales

- Type: Four-page weekly
- Format: Broadsheet
- Owner: Harold Campbell
- Founded: December 1904
- Relaunched: The Gilgandra Weekly

The Castlereagh, also published as The Gilgandra Weekly and Castlereagh and The Gilgandra Weekly, was the first newspaper published in Gilgandra, New South Wales, Australia. It was an English language paper, published weekly in broadsheet format.

== Early history ==
The first issue of the newspaper (The Castlereagh Vol. 1 – No. 1) was published on Friday, 13 January 1905, following its establishment in December 1904. The paper's first publishers were John Alfred Porter and Thomas Crouch.

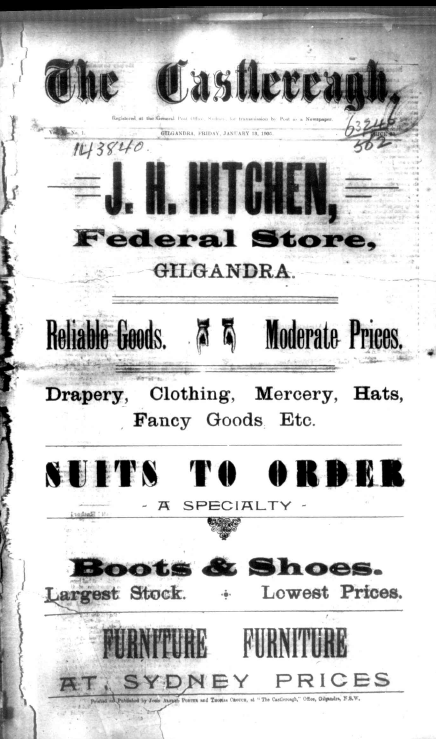
Cover page of The Castlereagh, 13 January 1905

The Back to Gilgandra – Souvenir Booklet states that The Castlereagh was produced as a four-page weekly, but the first issue of the newspaper was 12 pages long. The last digitised issue of the paper which is available via Trove, is Vol. 3 – No. 51, and was published on Friday, 20 December 1907. It was 17 pages long and included a four-page Christmas supplement. By this stage, the masthead bore the subtitle "Circulating throughout Gilgandra, Curban, Collie, Gular, Armatree, Tooraweenah, Balladoran & Mundooran Districts".

== J.Foley ==
According to the authors of "Back to Gilgandra – Souvenir Booklet" September 20–26, 1937, on 11 May 1906, P.J. MacManus and J. Foley, formerly of the Orange Leader, assumed control of The Castlereagh. Later, Foley disposed of his interests.

== Rival paper ==
A rival newspaper, The Castlereagh Liberal, was established in 1910 by the Farmers and Settlers Association, under the management of P.J. Donelly, who was later succeeded by A.E. Perkins. The Castlereagh Liberal was printed for approximately one year before commercial pressures forced its owners to sell. In 1911, the plant and goodwill were sold to the editor A.E. Perkins, who continued to print a paper under The Castlereagh Liberal masthead.

== Gilgandra Weekly ==
In October 1915, the masthead changed to Gilgandra Weekly, with a short note underneath reading, "with which is incorporated 'The Castlereagh Liberal'". The volume and issue numbers continued in sequence from those first published on The Liberal.

In 1921, the Gilgandra Weekly was purchased by H.E.O. (Harold) Campbell, who began his career as an apprentice on the Gilgandra Weekly in 1914, and went on to own many regional newspapers.

== P.J. MacManus ==
In 1925, The Castlereagh was purchased from P.J. MacManus by Harold Campbell. Between 1925 and 1929, the Gilgandra Weekly and The Castlereagh were both printed, with The Castlereagh providing more hard news content, while the Gilgandra Weekly became more like a tabloid newspaper in content. In November 1929, the titles were amalgamated and produced under the combined masthead of The Gilgandra Weekly and Castlereagh. The Castlereagh tag was dropped in the 1940s, and the paper became known as The Gilgandra Weekly.

== Digitisation ==
Issues of The Castlereagh, The Gilgandra Weekly and Castlereagh, and The Gilgandra Weekly have all been digitised as part of the Australian Newspapers Digitisation Program of the National Library of Australia.

== See also ==
- List of newspapers in Australia
- List of newspapers in New South Wales
- List of defunct newspapers of Australia
