= Belleek =

Belleek may refer to:

- Belleek, County Fermanagh, a village and civil parish in County Fermanagh, Northern Ireland
  - Belleek Pottery, the village's major industry
- Belleek, County Armagh, a townland in County Armagh, Northern Ireland (also known as Belleeks).
- Belleek, County Mayo, an estate outside Ballina
