= Shantallow =

Townland in Derry city, Northern Ireland

Coordinates: 55.001°N 7.326°W

Shantallow: Irish: Seantalamh
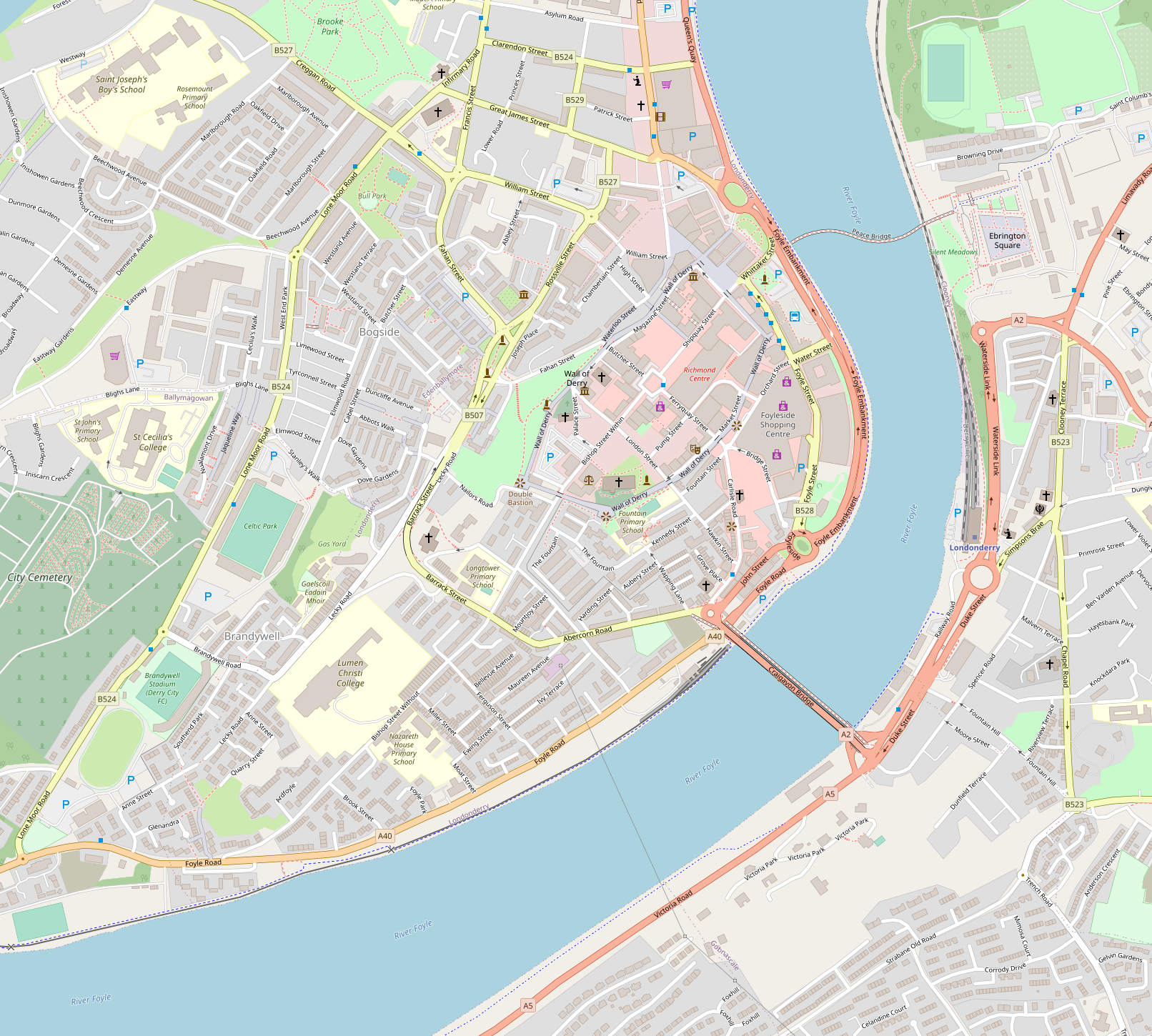
- Location in Derry Location within Northern Ireland
- District: Derry and Strabane
- County: County Londonderry
- Country: Northern Ireland
- Sovereign state: United Kingdom
- Post town: LONDONDERRY
- Postcode district: BT48
- Dialling code: 028
- Police: Northern Ireland
- Fire: Northern Ireland
- Ambulance: Northern Ireland
- UK Parliament: Foyle
- NI Assembly: Foyle

Shantallow (from Irish Seantalamh, meaning 'old land') is a townland in County Londonderry, Northern Ireland. It is now part of the city of Derry, and is situated within Derry and Strabane district. It lies within the civil parish of Templemore and former barony of North-West Liberties of Londonderry. The townland is no longer a visible feature of Derry, being mainly built over with 20th-century housing estates.

== 2001 Census ==
Shantallow East and West are classified by the Northern Ireland Statistics and Research Agency (NISRA) as being within Derry Urban Area (DUA). On Census day (29 April 2001) there were 2,748 people living in Shantallow East and 6,406 living in Shantallow West.

Of those living in Shantallow East:

- 29.3% were under 16 years old and 14.0% were aged 60 and above;
- 48.9% of the population were male and 51.1% of the population were female; and
- 98.3% were from a Catholic Community Background and 1.4% were from a 'Protestant and Other Christian (including Christian related) Background.
- 8.5% of people aged 16–74 were unemployed

Of those living in Shantallow West:

- 37.2% were under 16 years old and 4.8% were aged 60 and above;
- 47.7% of the population were male and 52.3% were female;
- 97.0% were from a Catholic Community Background and 2.3% were from a 'Protestant and Other Christian (including Christian related) Background.
- 8.8% of people aged 16–74 were unemployed

== Deprivation ==
According to the Northern Ireland Multiple Deprivation Measure (NIMDM) of 2005, out of 582 wards in Northern Ireland, Shantallow East was ranked as the 22nd most deprived ward, while Shantallow West was ranked 47th.
