= List of Irish medium secondary schools in Northern Ireland =

This is a list of the current Irish medium secondary schools in Northern Ireland.

School name	English name equivalent	Location	County	Ref.
Ardscoil Naomh Maolmhaodhóg	St Malachy's High School	Castlewellan	Down	
Coláiste Chaitríona	St Catherine's College	Armagh	Armagh	
Coláiste Feirste	N/A	Belfast	Antrim	
Gaelcholáiste Dhoire	N/A	Dungiven	Londonderry	
Scoil Iósaef	St Joseph's Grammar School	Dungannon	Tyrone	

== See also ==
- Gaelscoil
- List of Irish medium primary schools in Northern Ireland
- List of Irish medium nurseries in Northern Ireland
