= List of Irish medium nurseries in Northern Ireland =

This is a list of Irish medium nurseries in Northern Ireland.

== Antrim ==
- Naíscoil Ghleann Darach, Crumlin
- Naíscoil an Chaistil, Ballycastle
- Naíscoil Naomh Éanna, Glengormley
- Naíscoil na Fíoba, Toome

== Armagh ==
- Naíscoil na mBráithre Críostaí, Armagh
- Naíscoil na Páirce Glaise, Armagh
- Naíscoil na Caille, Armagh
- Naíscoil an Chreagáin, Crossmaglen
- Naíscoil Chois Locha, Lurgan
- Naíscoil na Banna, Garvaghy Road
- Naíscoil an Chéide, Keady

== Belfast ==
- Naíscoil Mhic Reachtain, Antrim Road
- Naíscoil an Lonnáin, Falls Road
- Naíscoil an tSléibhe Dhuibh, Ballymurphy road
- Luathbhlianta an tSléibhe Dhuibh, Ballymurphy road
- Naí-Ionad Ard Eoin, Herbert street
- Naíscoil Bheann Mhadagáin, Cliftonville road
- Naíscoil Bhreandáin, Ros Goill Park
- Tús Maith, Iveagh Crescent
- Gael Spraoi, Iveagh Crescent
- Naíscoil na Móna, Monagh Lodge
- Naíonra na Móna, Monagh Lodge
- Naíonra an Droichid, Ormeau Road
- Naíscoil an Droichid, Ormeau Road
- Naíscoil na Fuiseoige, Cill Uaighe

== Down ==
- Naíscoil an Iúir, Newry
- Naíscoil Shliabh gCuillinn, Newry
- Naíscoil na mBeann, Kilkeel
- Naíscoil Dhún Pádraig, Downpatrick
- Naíscoil Bheanna Boirche Caisleán Nua, Castlewellan road
- Naíscoil Bheanna Boirche, Castlewellan

== Fermanagh ==
- Naíscoil an Traonaigh, Lisnaskea

== Londonderry ==
- Naíscoil Éadain Mhóir, Derry
- Naíscoil Dhoire, Derry
- Naíscoil na Daróige, Derry
- Naíscoil Cholmcille, Derry
- Naíscoil na Speiríní, Ballinascreen
- Naíscoil Neachtain, Dungiven
- Naíscoil Léim an Mhadaidh, Limavady
- Naí-ionad an tSeanchaí, Magherafelt
- Naíscoil Mhachaire Rátha, Machaire Rátha
- Naíscoil Charn Tóchair, Machaire Rátha
- Naíscoil Ghreanacháin, Swatragh

== Tyrone ==
- Naíscoil Aodha Rua, Dungannon
- Naíscoil Uí Néill, Coalisland
- Naíscoil Eoghain, Cookstown
- Naíscoil an tSratha Báin, Strabane
- Naíscoil Cholmcille na Carraige Móire, Carrickmore
- Naíscoil na gCrann, Omagh
- Naíscoil na Deirge, Castlederg

== See also ==
- List of Irish medium primary schools in Northern Ireland
- List of Irish medium secondary schools in Northern Ireland
- Gaelscoil
