= Banbridge =

Town in County Down, Northern Ireland

Coordinates: 54.348953°N 6.269975°W

Banbridge: Irish: Droichead na Banna; Scots: Bannbrig
- Town
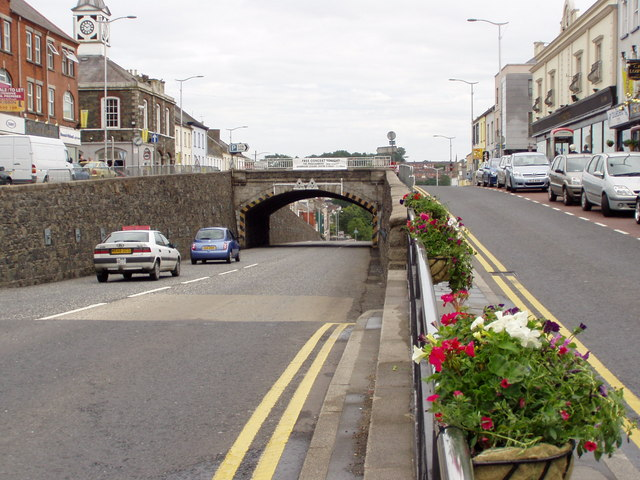
- 'The Cut' in Banbridge

- Location within County Down
- Population: 17,400 (2021 census)
  - Belfast: 21 mi (34 km)
- District: Armagh City, Banbridge and Craigavon
- County: County Down
- Country: Northern Ireland
- Sovereign state: United Kingdom
- Post town: BANBRIDGE
- Postcode district: BT32
- Dialling code: 028
- Police: Northern Ireland
- Fire: Northern Ireland
- Ambulance: Northern Ireland
- UK Parliament: Upper Bann
- NI Assembly: Upper Bann

Banbridge (/bænˈbrɪdʒ/ ban-BRIJ) is a town in County Down, Northern Ireland. It lies on the River Bann and the A1 road and is named after a bridge built over the Bann in 1712. It is in the civil parish of Seapatrick and the historic barony of Iveagh Upper, Upper Half. The town began as a coaching stop on the road from Belfast to Dublin and thrived from Irish linen manufacturing. The town was home to the headquarters of the former Banbridge District Council. Following a reform of local government in Northern Ireland in 2015, Banbridge became part of Armagh City, Banbridge and Craigavon Borough Council. It had a population of 17,400 in the 2021 census.

The town's main street is very unusual, rising to a steep hill before levelling out. In 1834 an underpass was built as horses with heavy loads would faint before reaching the top of the hill. It was built by William Dargan and is officially named 'Downshire Bridge', though it is often called "The Cut".

== History ==
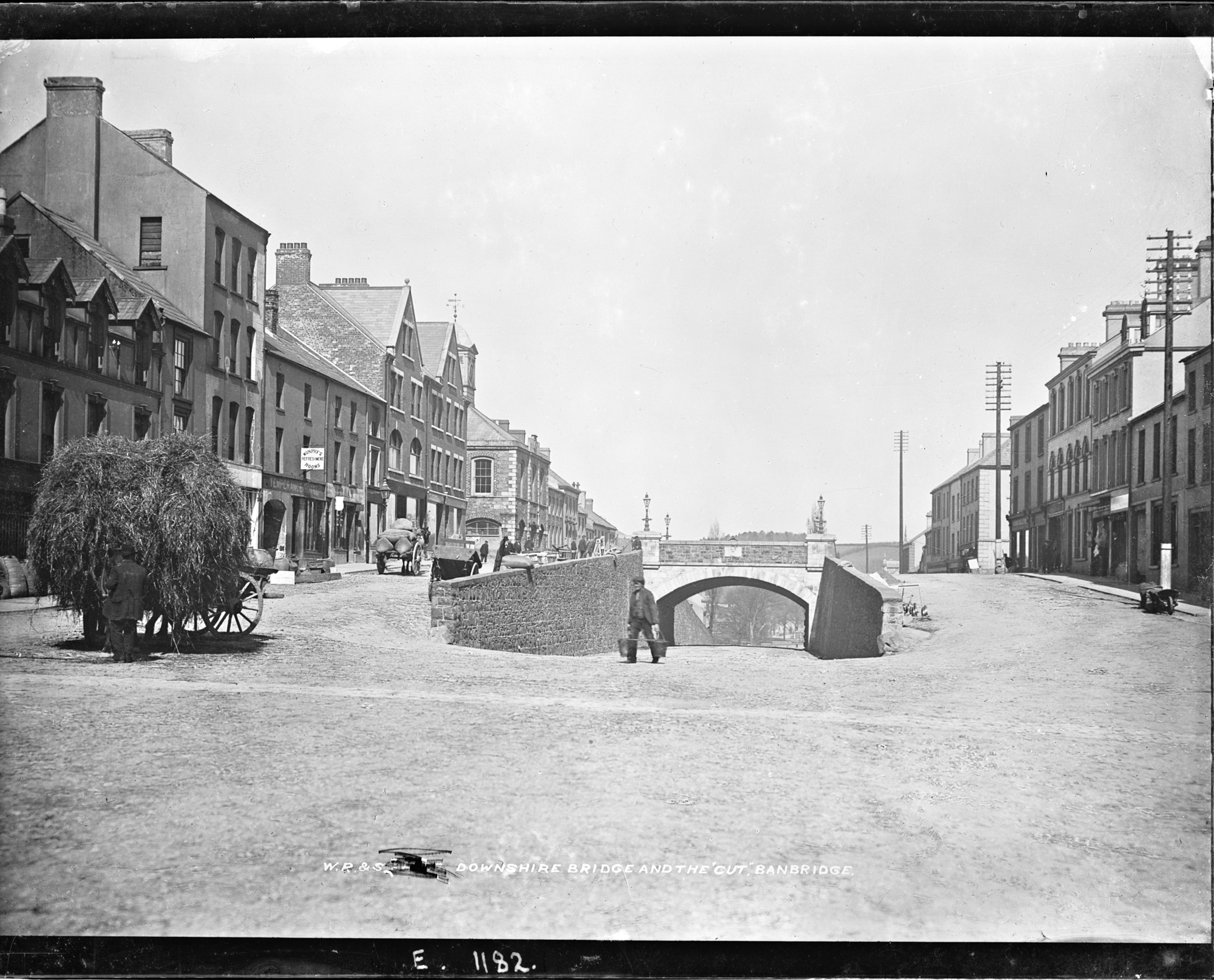
Banbridge in the early 1900s

Banbridge, home to the "Star of the County Down", is a relatively young town, first entering recorded history around 1691 during the aftermath of the struggle between William III and James II. An Outlawry Court was set up in the town to deal with the followers of James. The town grew up around the site where the main road from Belfast to Dublin crossed the River Bann over an Old Bridge which was situated where the present bridge now stands.

The town owes its success to flax and the linen industry, becoming the principal linen producing district in Ireland by 1772 with a total of 26 bleachgreens along the Bann. By 1820 the town was the centre of the 'Linen Homelands' and its prominence grew when it became a staging post on the mail coach route between Dublin and Belfast. A gift of £500 from the Marquis of Downshire around this time helped to alleviate some problems with the steepness of the road and paid for significant improvements. This industry has now greatly diminished in prominence, but Banbridge still has three of the major producers in Ulster; Weavers, Thomas Ferguson & Co, and John England Irish Linen.

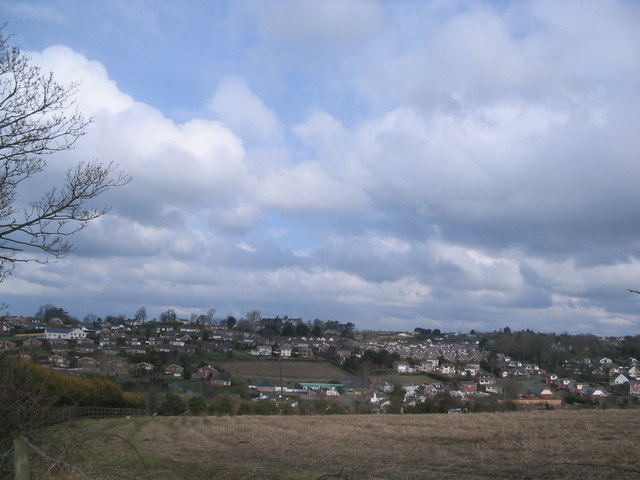
Housing estates in western Banbridge

In 1994, Banbridge was twinned with Ruelle-sur-Touvre in Nouvelle-Aquitaine, France.

=== The Burnings of 1920 ===
In 1920, Banbridge saw violence related to the ongoing Irish War of Independence and partition of Ireland. On the 17th July, the Irish Republican Army (IRA) assassinated British colonel Gerald Smyth in Cork. He had ordered police officers to shoot civilians if they did not immediately obey orders. In a 17 June 1920 speech at the Listowel, County Kerry Royal Irish Constabulary station Smyth is quoted as saying: "The more you shoot, the better I will like you, and I assure you no policeman will get into trouble for shooting any man." Smyth was from a wealthy Banbridge family, and his large funeral was held there on 21 July. After Smyth's funeral, about 3,000 Protestant loyalists took to the streets of Banbridge and wreaked revenge on the Catholic community. Many Catholic homes and businesses were attacked, burned and looted, despite police being present. A large mob of loyalists, some of them armed, attacked and tried to break into the home of a republican family. The father fired on the mob, killing Protestant William Sterritt. A local Orange lodge was later named in his honour. Hundreds of Catholic factory workers were also forced from their jobs, and many Catholic families fled Banbridge. Calm was restored after the British Army were deployed in the town. In the summer of 1920 sectarian rioting occurred in several other towns/cities in east Ulster: Belfast, Dromore and Newtownards.

=== The Troubles ===
Banbridge had three major bombings during the Troubles. On 15 March 1982, a Provisional IRA bomb on Bridge Street killed a schoolboy and injured 36 people. On 4 April 1991, another IRA bomb of 1,000 lb of explosives caused widespread damage and injured a police officer outside Banbridge Courthouse. There was also a dissident republican bombing on 1 August 1998 after the signing of the Good Friday Agreement (see 1998 Banbridge bombing) when a bomb detonated outside a shoe shop in Newry Street.

== Townlands ==
Like the rest of Northern Ireland, the Banbridge area is divided into townlands. Banbridge sprang up in a townland called Ballyvally. Over time, the surrounding townlands have been built upon and they have lent their names to many streets, roads and housing estates. The following townlands are in Banbridge:

- Ballydown (from Irish Baile an Dúin 'townland of the fort')
- Ballymoney (from Baile Muine meaning "townland of the thicket")
- Ballyvally (from Baile an Bhealaigh meaning "townland of the routeway")
- Drumnagally (from Dromainn Ó gCeallaigh meaning "O'Kelly's ridge")
- Edenderry (from Éadan Doire meaning "hill-brow of the oak-wood")
- Kilpike (historically Killpatrick, from Cill Phádraig meaning "St Patrick's church")
- Tullyear (from Tulaigh Eirre meaning "hillock of the boundary")

== Demography ==
=== 2011 census ===
On census day (27 March 2011) there were 16,637 people living in Banbridge (6,693 households), accounting for 0.92% of the NI total, representing an increase of 12.8% on the census 2001 population of 14,744. Of these:

- 21.92% were aged under 16 years and 13.69% were aged 65 and over.
- 51.21% of the usually resident population were female and 48.79% were male.
- 59.17% belong to or were brought up in a 'Protestant and Other Christian (including Christian related)' religion and 34.38% belong to or were brought up in the Catholic Christian faith.
- 61.59% indicated that they had a British national identity, 31.48% had a Northern Irish national identity and 15.39% had an Irish national identity (respondents could indicate more than one national identity).
- 37 years was the average (median) age of the population;
- 6.83% had some knowledge of Irish (Gaelic) and 6.35% had some knowledge of Ulster-Scots.

=== 2021 census ===
On census day (21 March 2021) there were 17,400 people living in Banbridge. Of these:

- 52.90% (9,204) belong to or were brought up in a 'Protestant and Other Christian (including Christian related)' religion and 35.24% belong to or were brought up in the Catholic Christian faith.
- 53.33% indicated that they had a British national identity, 37.71% had a Northern Irish national identity and 20.81% had an Irish national identity (respondents could indicate more than one national identity).

== Places of interest ==
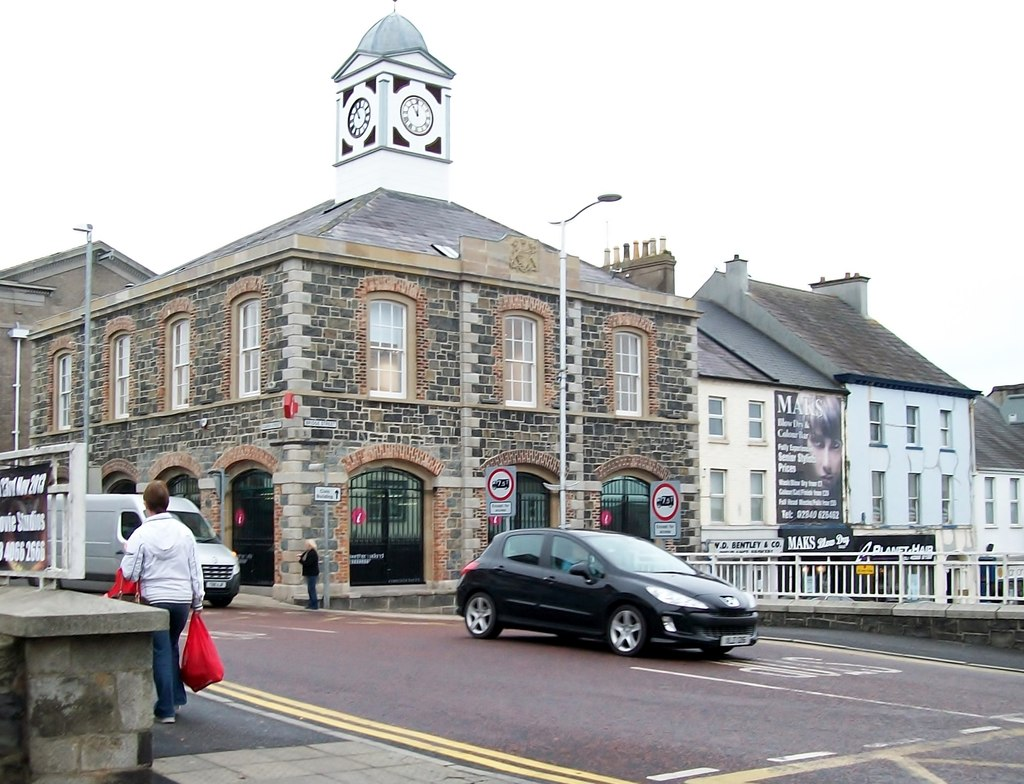
The Old Town Hall

Near the town lie the ancient Lisnagade Fort, Legannany Dolmen, and the Loughbrickland Crannóg, constructed around the year 500 AD. The Old Town Hall in Banbridge was completed in 1834.

In the centre of the town of Banbridge, a large 10.5 acre park which is called Solitude Park, which exists as a community centre. It is an urban park consisting of skateparks, rivers and grassland.

== Notable people ==
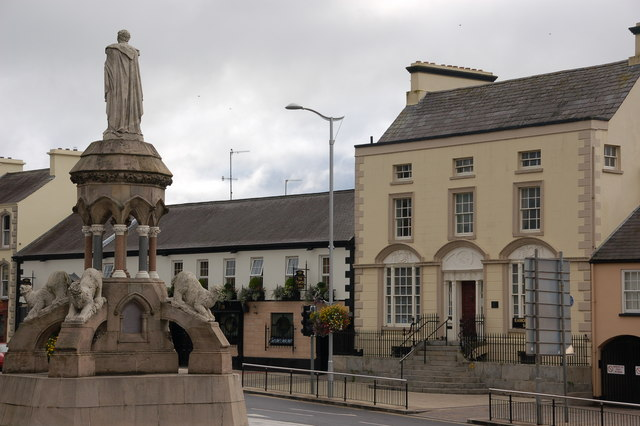
The monument to Francis Crozier

- Captain Francis Crozier, British naval officer and Arctic explorer, was born in Banbridge in 1796.
- Robbie Dennison, former Wolverhampton Wanderers FC winger and Northern Ireland football international.
- Samuel Fryar, politician from the 1930s.
- Dame Anna Hassan, educator, school principal.
- Dermott Lennon world show jumping champion hails from Ballinaskeagh just outside Banbridge.
- Samantha Lewthwaite, terrorism suspect.
- F. E. McWilliam, surrealist sculptor.
- John Mitchel, Irish nationalist activist and political journalist.
- Cyril Scott, actor
- Joseph M. Scriven, writer of the poem which became the hymn "What a Friend We Have in Jesus".
- Jonathan Tuffey, Former Northern Ireland international goalkeeper, currently playing with Crusaders in the NIFL Premiership.
- John Butler Yeats, artist and father of four artistic children. Among them were William Butler Yeats and Jack Butler Yeats.

== Transport ==
Banbridge is on the A1 main road between Belfast and Newry. The nearest railway station is Scarva on Northern Ireland Railways' Belfast–Newry railway line, about 4 miles (6.4 km) west of Banbridge.

Banbridge had its own railway station from 1859 until 1956. The Banbridge, Newry, Dublin and Belfast Junction Railway opened Banbridge (BJR) railway station on 23 March 1859. In contrast with its very long name, this was a short branch line between Banbridge and Scarva. This was followed by the opening of the Banbridge, Lisburn and Belfast Junction Railway between Knockmore Junction and Banbridge on 13 July 1863, which gave Banbridge a more direct link via Lisburn with Belfast Great Victoria Street. Banbridge (BJR) railway station was closed in favour of the new Banbridge (BLBR) railway station.

The Great Northern Railway took over both companies in 1877 and opened a branch line from Banbridge to Ballyroney in 1880. In 1906 the GNR opened an extension from Ballyroney to Castlewellan, where it connected with a new Belfast and County Down Railway branch line to Newcastle, County Down.

In 1953 the governments of Northern Ireland and the Irish Republic jointly nationalised the GNR as the GNR Board. On 1 May 1955 the GNRB closed Banbridge's lines to Scarva and Castlewellan. Banbridge (BLBR) railway station closed on 29 April 1956, when the GNRB closed the line from Knockmore Junction.

== Education ==
=== Primary ===
- Abercorn Primary School
- Ballydown Primary School
- Bridge Integrated Primary School
- Bronte Primary School
- Edenderry Primary School
- Milltown Cemetery Primary School
- St. Mary's Primary School (Catholic)

=== Post-primary ===
- Banbridge Academy
- Banbridge High School
- St Patrick's College, Banbridge
- New-Bridge Integrated College

== Sport ==
The Banbridge Hockey Club plays at Havelock Park.

Clann Na Banna (Founded 1903) are the local Gaelic Football and Hurling club, with their ground located at Cottage Park, Scarva Road.

Other sports clubs include Banbridge Bowling Club, Banbridge Town F.C. and Banbridge Rangers as well as Banbridge Rugby Club.

== Pop culture ==
- "The Star of the County Down" is a well known song associated with Banbridge.
- One of the Game of Thrones sets is in Linen Mill Studios, which was converted from a failed linen mill.

== See also ==
- List of towns and villages in Northern Ireland
- List of localities in Northern Ireland by population
- Market houses in Northern Ireland

== Sources ==
- Baker, Michael H.C. (1972). Irish Railways since 1916. London: Ian Allan. ISBN 978-0-7110-0282-1.
- Hajducki, S. Maxwell (1974). A Railway Atlas of Ireland. Newton Abbott: David & Charles. ISBN 0-7153-5167-2.
