= List of secondary schools in Northern Ireland =

This is a list of secondary schools in Northern Ireland, according to the Department of Education (Northern Ireland).

School name	City/ Town	County	Sector	Type	DENI reference number	References/Comments
Abbey Christian Brothers Grammar School	Newry	County Down	Voluntary	Grammar	542-0059	
Abbey Community College	Newtownabbey	County Antrim	Controlled	Secondary	321-0313	
All Saints College	Belfast	County Antrim	Voluntary	Secondary	123-0234	Merger of St Rose's Dominican College, Christian Brothers School and Corpus Christi College
Antrim Grammar School	Antrim	County Antrim	Controlled	Grammar	341-0209	
Aquinas Diocesan Grammar School	Belfast	County Antrim	Voluntary	Grammar	142-0277	
Ashfield Boys' High School	Belfast	County Antrim	Controlled	Secondary	121-0015	
Ashfield Girls' High School	Belfast	County Antrim	Controlled	Secondary	121-0014	
Assumption Grammar School	Ballynahinch	County Down	Voluntary	Grammar	442-0086	
Aughnacloy College	Aughnacloy	County Tyrone	Controlled	Secondary	521-0153	
Ballycastle High School	Ballycastle	County Antrim	Controlled	Secondary	321-0124	
Ballyclare High School	Ballyclare	County Antrim	Controlled	Grammar	341-0008	
Ballyclare Secondary School	Ballyclare	County Antrim	Controlled	Secondary	321-0134	
Ballymena Academy	Ballymena	County Antrim	Voluntary	Grammar	342-0011	
Ballymoney High School	Ballymoney	County Antrim	Controlled	Secondary	321-0133	
Banbridge Academy	Banbridge	County Down	Controlled	Grammar	541-0013	
Banbridge High School	Banbridge	County Down	Controlled	Secondary	521-0047	
Bangor Academy and Sixth Form College	Bangor	County Down	Controlled	Secondary	421-0296	
Bangor Grammar School	Bangor	County Down	Voluntary	Grammar	442-0015	
Belfast Boys' Model School	Belfast	County Antrim	Controlled	Secondary	121-0022	
Belfast High School	Newtownabbey	County Antrim	Voluntary	Grammar	342-0077	
Belfast Model School For Girls	Belfast	County Antrim	Controlled	Secondary	121-0021	
Belfast Royal Academy	Belfast	County Antrim	Voluntary	Grammar	142-0028	
Blackwater Integrated College	Downpatrick	County Down	Grant Maintained Integrated	Secondary	426-0309	
Blessed Trinity College	Belfast	County Antrim	Roman Catholic Maintained	Secondary	123-0321	
Bloomfield Collegiate	Belfast	County Antrim	Controlled	Grammar	141-0315	
Breda Academy	Belfast	County Antrim	Controlled	Secondary	421-0316	
Brownlow Integrated College	Craigavon	County Armagh	Controlled Integrated	Secondary	525-0216	
Cambridge House Grammar School	Ballymena	County Antrim	Controlled	Grammar	341-0297	
Campbell College	Belfast	County Antrim	Voluntary	Grammar	142-0020	
Carrickfergus Academy	Carrickfergus	County Antrim	Controlled	Secondary	321-0323	
Carrickfergus Grammar School	Carrickfergus	County Antrim	Controlled	Grammar	341-0098	
Castlederg High School	Castlederg	County Tyrone	Controlled	Secondary	221-0065	
Christian Brothers' Grammar School	Omagh	County Tyrone	Voluntary	Grammar	242-0064	
City Armagh High School	Armagh	County Armagh	Controlled	Secondary	521-0121	
Clounagh Junior High School	Portadown	County Armagh	Controlled	Secondary	521-0043	
Coláiste Feirste	Belfast	County Antrim	Other Maintained	Secondary	124-0291	
Coleraine College	Coleraine	County Londonderry	Controlled	Secondary	321-0300	
Coleraine Grammar	Coleraine	County Londonderry	Voluntary	Grammar	342-0317	
Cookstown High School	Cookstown	County Tyrone	Controlled	Secondary	521-0230	
Craigavon Senior High School	Portadown	County Armagh	Controlled	Secondary	521-0282	
Cross and Passion College	Ballycastle	County Antrim	Roman Catholic Maintained	Secondary	323-0227	
Crumlin Integrated College	Crumlin	County Antrim	Controlled Integrated	Secondary	325-0149	
Cullybackey College	Ballymena	County Antrim	Controlled	Secondary	321-0172	
Dalriada School	Ballymoney	County Antrim	Voluntary	Grammar	342-0012	
De La Salle College	Belfast	County Antrim	Roman Catholic Maintained	Secondary	123-0182	
Dean Maguirc College	Omagh	County Tyrone	Roman Catholic Maintained	Secondary	223-0138	
Devenish College	Enniskillen	County Fermanagh	Controlled	Secondary	221-0312	
Dominican College	Belfast	County Antrim	Voluntary	Grammar	142-0082	
Dominican College	Portstewart	County Londonderry	Voluntary	Grammar	342-0068	
Down High School	Downpatrick	County Down	Controlled	Grammar	441-0085	
Dromore High School	Dromore	County Down	Controlled	Secondary	521-0064	
Drumglass High School	Dungannon	County Tyrone	Controlled	Secondary	521-0231	
Drumragh Integrated College	Omagh	County Tyrone	Grant Maintained Integrated	Secondary	226-0283	
Dunclug College	Ballymena	County Antrim	Controlled	Secondary	321-0208	
Dundonald High School	Belfast	County Antrim	Controlled	Secondary	421-0262	
Dunluce School	Bushmills	County Antrim	Controlled	Secondary	321-0222	
Edmund Rice College	Newtownabbey	County Antrim	Roman Catholic Maintained	Secondary	323-0203	
Enniskillen Royal Grammar School	Enniskillen	County Fermanagh	Voluntary	Grammar	242-0320	
Erne Integrated College	Enniskillen	County Fermanagh	Grant Maintained Integrated	Secondary	226-0280	
Fivemiletown College	Fivemiletown	County Tyrone	Controlled	Secondary	521-0097	
Fort Hill College	Lisburn	County Antrim	Controlled Integrated	Secondary	425-0072	
Foyle College	Derry	County Londonderry	Voluntary	Grammar	242-0229	
Friends' School	Lisburn	County Antrim	Voluntary	Grammar	442-0050	
Gaelcholáiste Dhoire	Dungiven	County Londonderry	Other Maintained	Secondary	224-0319	
Glastry College	Newtownards	County Down	Controlled	Secondary	421-0046	
Glengormley High School	Newtownabbey	County Antrim	Controlled	Secondary	321-0202	
Glenlola Collegiate	Bangor	County Down	Controlled	Grammar	441-0097	
Grosvenor Grammar School	Belfast	County Down	Controlled	Grammar	141-0079	
Hazelwood College	Newtownabbey	County Antrim	Grant Maintained Integrated	Secondary	126-0269	
Holy Cross College	Strabane	County Tyrone	Roman Catholic Maintained	Secondary	223-0301	
Holy Trinity College	Cookstown	County Tyrone	Roman Catholic Maintained	Secondary	523-0278	
Hunterhouse College	Belfast	County Antrim	Voluntary	Grammar	142-0265	
Integrated College Dungannon	Dungannon	County Tyrone	Grant Maintained Integrated	Secondary	526-0286	
Kilkeel High School	Newry	County Down	Controlled	Secondary	521-0016	
Killicomaine Junior High School	Portadown	County Armagh	Controlled	Secondary	521-0054	
Lagan College	Belfast	County Down	Grant Maintained Integrated	Secondary	426-0255	Operates a grammar stream
Larne Grammar School	Larne	County Antrim	Voluntary	Grammar	342-0046	
Larne High School	Larne	County Antrim	Controlled	Secondary	321-0038	
Laurelhill Community College	Lisburn	County Antrim	Controlled	Secondary	421-0201	
Lecale Trinity Grammar School	Downpatrick	County Down	Voluntary	Grammar	442-0325	Merger with De La Salle High School, St Patricks Grammar School and St Mary's High School
Limavady Grammar School	Limavady	County Londonderry	Controlled	Grammar	241-0048	
Limavady High School	Limavady	County Londonderry	Controlled	Secondary	221-0302	
Lismore College	Craigavon	County Armagh	Roman Catholic Maintained	Secondary	523-0213	
Lisnagarvey High School	Lisburn	County Antrim	Controlled	Secondary	421-0051	
Lisneal College	Derry	County Londonderry	Controlled	Secondary	221-0306	
Loreto College	Coleraine	County Londonderry	Voluntary	Grammar	342-0034	
Loreto Grammar School	Omagh	County Tyrone	Voluntary	Grammar	242-0065	
Lumen Christi College	Derry	County Londonderry	Voluntary	Grammar	242-0287	
Lurgan College	Craigavon	County Armagh	Controlled	Grammar	541-0057	
Lurgan Junior High	Lurgan	County Armagh	Controlled	Secondary	521-0271	
Magherafelt High School	Magherafelt	County Londonderry	Controlled	Secondary	321-0035	
Malone Integrated College	Belfast	County Antrim	Grant Maintained Integrated	Secondary	126-0294	
Markethill High School	Armagh	County Armagh	Controlled	Secondary	521-0083	
Mercy College Belfast	Belfast	County Antrim	Roman Catholic Maintained	Secondary	123-0104	
Methodist College	Belfast	County Antrim	Voluntary	Grammar	142-0022	
Mount Lourdes Grammar School	Enniskillen	County Fermanagh	Voluntary	Grammar	242-0041	
Movilla High School	Newtownards	County Down	Controlled	Secondary	421-0012	
Nendrum College	Newtownards	County Down	Controlled	Secondary	421-0045	
New-Bridge Integrated College	Banbridge	County Down	Grant Maintained Integrated	Secondary	526-0285	
Newry High School	Newry	County Down	Controlled	Secondary	521-0186	
Newtownhamilton High School	Newry	County Down	Controlled	Secondary	521-0025	
North Coast Integrated College	Coleraine	County Londonderry	Grant Maintained Integrated	Secondary	326-0290	
Oakgrove Integrated College	Derry	County Londonderry	Grant Maintained Integrated	Secondary	226-0276	
Omagh Academy	Omagh	County Tyrone	Controlled	Grammar	241-0066	
Omagh High School	Omagh	County Tyrone	Controlled	Secondary	221-0125	
Our Lady and St Patrick's College	Belfast	County Antrim	Voluntary	Grammar	442-0259	
Our Lady of Lourdes High School	Ballymoney	County Antrim	Roman Catholic Maintained	Secondary	323-0075	
Our Lady's Grammar School	Newry	County Down	Voluntary	Grammar	542-0060	
Parkhall Integrated College	Antrim	County Antrim	Controlled Integrated	Secondary	325-0207	
Portadown College	Craigavon	County Armagh	Controlled	Grammar	541-0067	
Priory Integrated College	Holywood	County Down	Controlled Integrated	Secondary	425-0024	
Rainey Endowed School	Magherafelt	County Londonderry	Voluntary	Grammar	342-0058	
Rathfriland High School	Newry	County Down	Controlled	Secondary	521-0127	
Rathmore Grammar School	Belfast	County Antrim	Voluntary	Grammar	142-0095	
Regent House School	Newtownards	County Down	Controlled	Grammar	441-0063	
Royal Belfast Academical Institution	Belfast	County Antrim	Voluntary	Grammar	142-0027	
Sacred Heart College	Omagh	County Tyrone	Roman Catholic Maintained	Secondary	223-0298	
Sacred Heart Grammar School	Newry	County Down	Voluntary	Grammar	542-0076	
Saintfield High School	Saintfield	County Down	Controlled	Secondary	421-0063	
Shimna Integrated College	Newcastle	County Down	Grant Maintained Integrated	Secondary	426-0281	
Slemish College	Ballymena	County Antrim	Grant Maintained Integrated	Secondary	326-0289	Operates a grammar stream
Sperrin Integrated College	Magherafelt	County Londonderry	Grant Maintained Integrated	Secondary	326-0303	
St Aidan's High School, Derrylin	Derrylin	County Fermanagh	Roman Catholic Maintained	Secondary	223-0166	
St Benedict's College	Randalstown	County Antrim	Roman Catholic Maintained	Secondary	323-0308	
St Brigid's College	Derry	County Londonderry	Roman Catholic Maintained	Secondary	223-0225	
St Catherine's College	Armagh	County Armagh	Roman Catholic Maintained	Secondary	523-0218	
St Cecilia's College	Derry	County Londonderry	Roman Catholic Maintained	Secondary	223-0188	
St Ciaran's High School	Ballygawley	County Tyrone	Roman Catholic Maintained	Secondary	523-0152	
St Colman's College	Newry	County Down	Voluntary	Grammar	542-0062	
St Colman's High and Sixth Form College	Ballynahinch	County Down	Roman Catholic Maintained	Secondary	423-0161	
St Colmcille's High School	Crossgar	County Down	Roman Catholic Maintained	Secondary	423-0102	
St Colm's High School	Belfast	County Antrim	Roman Catholic Maintained	Secondary	423-0223	
St Colm's High School Draperstown	Draperstown	County Londonderry	Roman Catholic Maintained	Secondary	323-0132	
St Columbanus' College	Bangor	County Down	Roman Catholic Maintained	Secondary	423-0107	
St Columba's College, Portaferry	Portaferry	County Down	Roman Catholic Maintained	Secondary	423-0067	
St Columb's College	Derry	County Londonderry	Voluntary	Grammar	242-0054	
St Conor's College	Portglenone	County Antrim	Roman Catholic Maintained	Secondary	323-0318	
St Dominic's Grammar School for Girls	Belfast	County Antrim	Voluntary	Grammar	142-0029	
St Fanchea's College	Enniskillen	County Fermanagh	Roman Catholic Maintained	Secondary	223-0099	
St Genevieve's High School	Belfast	County Antrim	Roman Catholic Maintained	Secondary	123-0155	
St John the Baptist College	Armagh	County Armagh	Roman Catholic Maintained	Secondary	523-0321	
St John's Business and Enterprise College	Omagh	County Tyrone	Roman Catholic Maintained	Secondary	223-0148	
St Joseph's Boys' High School	Newry	County Down	Roman Catholic Maintained	Secondary	523-0056	
St Joseph's Boys' School	Derry	County Londonderry	Roman Catholic Maintained	Secondary	223-0131	
St Joseph's College, Belfast	Belfast	County Antrim	Roman Catholic Maintained	Secondary	123-0275	
St Joseph's College, Enniskillen	Enniskillen	County Fermanagh	Roman Catholic Maintained	Secondary	223-0100	
St Joseph's College	Coleraine	County Londonderry	Roman Catholic Maintained	Secondary	323-0110	merged
St Joseph's College, Coalisland	Coalisland	County Tyrone	Roman Catholic Maintained	Secondary	523-0192	
St Joseph's Grammar School	Donaghmore	County Tyrone	Voluntary	Grammar	542-0073	
St Joseph's High School	Crossmaglen	County Armagh	Roman Catholic Maintained	Secondary	523-0167	
St Kevin's College, Belleek	Belleek	County Fermanagh	Roman Catholic Maintained	Secondary	223-0322	
St Killian's College	Ballymena	County Antrim	Roman Catholic Maintained	Secondary	323-0310	
St Louis Grammar School	Ballymena	County Antrim	Voluntary	Grammar	342-0010	
St Louis Grammar School	Kilkeel	County Down	Voluntary	Grammar	542-0045	
St Louise's Comprehensive College	Belfast	County Antrim	Roman Catholic Maintained	Secondary	123-0053	
St Malachy's College	Belfast	County Antrim	Voluntary	Grammar	142-0030	
St Malachy's High School	Castlewellan	County Down	Roman Catholic Maintained	Secondary	423-0211	
St Mark's High School	Warrenpoint	County Down	Roman Catholic Maintained	Secondary	523-0135	
St Mary's Christian Brothers' Grammar School	Belfast	County Antrim	Voluntary	Grammar	142-0021	
St Mary's College	Derry	County Londonderry	Roman Catholic Maintained	Secondary	223-0081	
St Mary's College, Irvinestown	Irvinestown	County Fermanagh	Roman Catholic Maintained	Secondary	223-0109	
St Mary's Grammar School	Magherafelt	County Londonderry	Voluntary	Grammar	342-0080	
St Mary's High School, Brollagh	Brollagh	County Fermanagh	Roman Catholic Maintained	Secondary	223-0085	
St Mary's High School	Newry	County Down	Roman Catholic Maintained	Secondary	523-0108	
St Mary's High School, Limavady	Limavady	County Londonderry	Roman Catholic Maintained	Secondary	223-0077	
St Michael's College	Enniskillen	County Fermanagh	Voluntary	Grammar	242-0043	
St Patricks & St Brigids College	Derry	County Londonderry	Roman Catholic Maintained	Secondary	223-0122	
St Patrick's Academy	Dungannon	County Tyrone	Voluntary	Grammar	542-0304	
St Patrick's Academy	Lisburn	County Antrim	Roman Catholic Maintained	Secondary	423-0165	
St Patrick's Co-ed Comprehensive College	Maghera	County Londonderry	Roman Catholic Maintained	Secondary	323-0234	
St Patrick's College	Derry	County Londonderry	Roman Catholic Maintained	Secondary	223-0144	
St Patrick's College, Ballymena	Ballymena	County Antrim	Roman Catholic Maintained	Secondary	323-0084	
St Patrick's College, Banbridge	Banbridge	County Down	Roman Catholic Maintained	Secondary	523-0076	
St Patrick's College	Dungannon	County Tyrone	Roman Catholic Maintained	Secondary	523-0293	
St Patrick's Grammar School	Armagh	County Armagh	Voluntary	Grammar	542-0268	
St Patrick's High School	Keady	County Armagh	Roman Catholic Maintained	Secondary	523-0187	
St Paul's High School, Bessbrook	Bessbrook	County Down	Roman Catholic Maintained	Secondary	523-0157	
St Pius X College	Magherafelt	County Londonderry	Roman Catholic Maintained	Secondary	323-0168	
St Ronan's College	Lurgan	County Armagh	Voluntary	Grammar	542-0314	
Strabane Academy	Strabane	County Tyrone	Controlled	Grammar	241-0311	
Strangford Integrated College	Carrowdore	County Down	Grant Maintained Integrated	Secondary	426-0295	Operates a grammar stream
Strathearn School	Belfast	County Antrim	Voluntary	Grammar	142-0089	
Sullivan Upper School	Holywood	County Down	Voluntary	Grammar	442-0044	
Tandragee Junior High School	Tandragee	County Armagh	Controlled	Secondary	521-0143	
The High School Ballynahinch	Ballynahinch	County Down	Controlled	Secondary	421-0029	
The Royal School Armagh	Armagh	County Armagh	Voluntary	Grammar	542-0263	
The Royal School Dungannon	Dungannon	County Tyrone	Voluntary	Grammar	542-0260	
Thornhill College	Derry	County Londonderry	Voluntary	Grammar	242-0052	
Ulidia Integrated College	Carrickfergus	County Antrim	Grant Maintained Integrated	Secondary	326-0299	
Victoria College	Belfast	County Antrim	Voluntary	Grammar	142-0264	
Wallace High School	Lisburn	County Antrim	Voluntary	Grammar	442-0051	
Wellington College	Belfast	County Antrim	Controlled	Grammar	141-0270	

== See also ==
- List of Irish medium nurseries in Northern Ireland
- List of Irish medium primary schools in Northern Ireland
- List of Irish medium secondary schools in Northern Ireland
- List of integrated schools in Northern Ireland
- List of grammar schools in Northern Ireland
- List of primary schools in Northern Ireland
- Gaelscoil
