= Sperrin Integrated College =

Location
- 39 Pound Road; Magherafelt, Derry, County Londonderry, BT45 6NR; Northern Ireland; 54.7584°N 6.5942°W

Information
- Type: Grant Maintained Integrated all-ability school
- Established: 2002
- Head teacher: B A Heron
- Staff: 68
- Gender: Co-educational
- Age: 11 to 18
- Enrolment: 670 As of May 2024
- Website: www.sperrincollege.com

Sperrin Integrated College, 39 Pound Road, Magherafelt, Londonderry, Northern Ireland is an integrated secondary school for 11-19 year olds. As of June 2024 the admission number is 120 and enrolment is 670. B A Heron is the school's current principal.

== Context ==
Integrated Education is a Northern Ireland phenomenon, where traditionally schools were sectarian, either run as Catholic schools or Protestant schools. On as parental request, a school could apply to 'transition' to become Grant Maintained offering 30% of the school places to students from the minority community. Lagan College was the first integrated school to open in 1981.

== Description ==
The college has enjoyed sustained growth against a downturn in demographics. It had a year 8 admissions number of 80, and a capacity (enrolment) of 500. It was oversubscribed and in the 4 years from 2016 it had admitted 86, 97, 81, and 105. The school roll rose to 530. Five hundred is below the number of students needed to run the sixth form and remain financially. The college applied to raise its admissions number to 100 which would create a viable school of 720. The expansion was granted. Students travel long distances to attend school in Magherafelt. The nearest Integrated Colleges are: North Coast Integrated College a 31.8miles, Parkhall Integrated College at 17.6miles, Integrated College Dungannon at 23.2miles and Slemish College at 17.4miles.

== See also ==
- List of integrated schools in Northern Ireland
- List of secondary schools in Northern Ireland
- Education in Northern Ireland
