= Hazelwood Integrated College =

Location
- 70 Whitewell Road; Belfast, County Antrim, BT36 7ES; Northern Ireland; 54.648°N 5.922°W

Information
- Type: Integrated
- Motto: Latin: Facta Non Verba (Deeds Not Words)
- Established: 1985; 41 years ago
- Sister school: Hazelwood Integrated Primary School
- Principal: Alix Jackson
- Deputy Principal: Maurice Fitzsimons
- Chair of Board of Governors: Trevor Parkhill MBE
- Website: www.hazelwoodcollege.co.uk

Hazelwood Integrated College is an integrated secondary school in Newtownabbey, County Antrim, Northern Ireland. The school's students are aged from 11 to 18 years. As of September 2018, the school's principal was Ms Máire Thompson.

== Context ==
Integrated Education is a Northern Ireland phenomenon, where traditionally schools were sectarian, either run as Catholic schools or Protestant schools. On as parental request, a school could apply to 'transition' to become Grant Maintained offering 30% of the school places to students from the minority community. Lagan College was the first integrated school to open in 1981.

== History ==
Hazelwood Integrated College was founded in 1985. The initial intake of students was 17. The college acquired the former premises of Graymount Girls' School in June 1986 and increased its intake of students to 70. On August 31, 1988 the college was granted "maintained" status. Following a visit by the Minister of State for Education, Michael Ancram in May 1994, the college was awarded a grant of £9.9 million in order to build new school premises. The work was completed in 1999, at which time the college moved into its current state-of-the-art buildings.

In 2007, Hazelwood College became the first school in Northern Ireland to be awarded specialist status in digital arts. The school's motto is Latin: Facta Non Verba; translated into English as Deeds not words.

In 2016 the school gained positive publicity in the press regarding its policy of inclusiveness and awareness of LGBT issues. In the same year the College achieved its best ever set of GCSE results with 87% of students achieving Grade A*-C.

In August 2017 it was announced that TV and film producer Emma-Rosa Dias and screenwriter David McCrea, both alumni of Hazelwood, had returned to the college to shoot scenes for a short film being made for RTÉ.

Twice the college has been nominated in the TES schools awards.

The school was awarded “Secondary School of the Year” in June 2022 by TES.

== Campus ==
Hazelwood Integrated College consists of four main buildings. The Millennium Building, The Assembly Building, Graymount House and Cedar Lodge. Graymount House is notable for its long history. It is a regency house with neo-classical detailing designed by Thomas Jackson in 1835 and opened by linen merchant William Gray in 1919. The House was bought by the Belfast Corporation for the municipal hospital for Tuberculosis children. It then served as the headquarters for the auxiliary fire service during WW2. It reopened in 1945 as Graymount Girls' School. Today it serves as the college's administrative center.

== Academics ==
In 2021, 83 per cent of students achieved three A* to C grades in the GCSE A-level examinations. In the same year, 96 per cent of students obtained five or more GCSE grades A*-C.

== Notable alumni ==
- Oliver Jeffers (b. 1977), artist, illustrator and writer
- Emma-Rosa Dias, TV and film producer

== See also ==
- List of integrated schools in Northern Ireland
- List of secondary schools in Northern Ireland
- Education in Northern Ireland
