= Brownlow Integrated College =

Location
- Tullgally Road; Craigavon, County Armagh, BT65 5BS; Northern Ireland; 54.448°N 6.364°W

Information
- Type: Controlled Integrated
- Religious affiliation: Integrated
- Established: 1973; 53 years ago
- Status: Open
- Local authority: Education Authority
- Principal: Mr O’Hara
- Staff: 51
- Gender: Co-educational
- Age: 11 to 16
- Enrollment: 424 (2023/24)
- Houses: Antrim; Mourne; Sperrin
- Colour
- Website: https://www.brownlowcollege.co.uk

Brownlow Integrated College is a controlled integrated school in Craigavon, County Armagh, Northern Ireland. It was founded in 1973 as Brownlow High School. In 1991, it became the first secondary school in Northern Ireland to transition from a state-controlled school to an integrated school. Mr N O'Hara is the school's current principal.

Brownlow has about 320 pupils as of 2018. It is not part of the Craigavon two-tier system. The year 8 intake in 2018 was 64.

== Context ==
Integrated Education is a Northern Ireland phenomenon, where traditionally schools were sectarian, either run as Catholic schools or Protestant schools. On as parental request, a school could apply to 'transition' to become Grant Maintained offering 30% of the school places to students from the minority community. Lagan College was the first integrated school to open in 1981.

As of 2024, students at Brownlow Integrated College were 23% Protestant, 43% Roman Catholic and 34% other.

== See also ==
- List of integrated schools in Northern Ireland
- List of secondary schools in Northern Ireland
- Education in Northern Ireland
