= Crumlin Integrated College =

Location
- 10 Glenavy Road; Crumlin, Co Antrim, BT69 4LA
- Coordinates: 54.614°N 6.222°W

Information
- Type: Controlled integrated
- Founded: 2006; 20 years ago
- School number: 3250169
- Principal: John Conlon
- Age range: 11–16
- Enrolment: 100 As of 2018
- Capacity: 400
- Website: crumlinintegratedcollege.co.uk

Crumlin Integrated College is an integrated, secondary school founded in 2006, located in Crumlin, County Antrim, Northern Ireland. It lies within the North Eastern Education and Library Board area. It was formerly Crumlin High School: the transition was announced in July 2006 by Education Minister, Maria Eagle. She said “Education has a vital role in helping to create the conditions necessary for long-term peace and stability in Northern Ireland."

== Context ==
Integrated Education is a Northern Ireland phenomenon, where traditionally schools were sectarian, either run as Catholic schools (Maintained) or Protestant schools (Controlled). On a parental request, a school could apply to 'transition' to become Grant Maintained (Integrated school) which would offer 30% of the school places to students from the minority community. Lagan College was the first integrated school to open in 1981. A small number of existing controlled schools have had their status changed by the local authority becoming 'controlled integrated schools'.

Under the delegated Northern Ireland education system, the year groups are numbered differently to their English cousins. In England the first year is Reception, then comes Year 1, in Northern Ireland, reception is year 1, and 11 year-olds transition to post-primary (secondary) into Year 8.

== Description ==
A small 11-16 school, with a capacity of 400. It was the first post-primary school in County Antrim to transition in 2006. It received an excoriating inspection report in 2010, and the then principal was suspended for two years and retrained. The replacement principal became very popular with the parents. The attendance fell from its 2010 level to 133 in 2014.

There was a proposal to close it in 2015 which was rejected. The school roll had dropped to 100 by 2018.

In 2018, the acting principal Lynda McGarry, announced a ten-year plan for expansion. The age range has been expanded to include a sixth form leading to well defined career pathways. The opening hours have been extended to include community use and in March 2018 a youth club opened on the site.

== See also ==
- List of integrated schools in Northern Ireland
- List of secondary schools in Northern Ireland
- Education in Northern Ireland
