= Strangford College =

Location
- Abbey Road; Carrowdore, Newtownards; County Down BT22 2GB; Northern Ireland
- Coordinates: 54.5796°N 5.5531°W

Information
- Other name: Strangford Integrated College
- Type: Grant-Maintained Integrated
- Motto: In hoc signo vinces (Under the sign we are strong)
- Religious affiliation: Integrated
- Established: 1997; 29 years ago
- Status: Open
- Local authority: Education Authority
- Principal: Mrs Clare Foster
- Gender: Co-educational
- Age: 11 to 18
- Enrolment: 834 (2024/25)
- Capacity: 760
- Houses: Mahee House; Ogliby House; Sketrick House; Taggart House
- Colours: Sixth Form
- Website: www.strangfordintegratedcollege.net

Strangford College, also known as Strangford Integrated College, is a school in Carrowdore, Newtownards, County Down, Northern Ireland. It is an integrated co-educational secondary school with a grammar stream with around 870+ students (2025/26). Mrs Clare Foster is the school's current principal.

== Context ==
Integrated Education is a Northern Ireland phenomenon, where traditionally schools were sectarian, either Catholic or Protestant. On parental request, a school could apply to 'transition' to become grant-maintained and offer 30% of the school places to students from the minority community. Lagan College was the first integrated school to open in 1981.

As of 2025, students at Strangford College were 39% Protestant, 19% Roman Catholic and 42% other.

== History ==
Strangford College opened 1 September 1997, with 64 students and 7 staff. It was awarded grant-maintained status in September 1999.

A new build was approved by the Department of Education in April 2016 and a contractor appointed in 2021 furthermore construction has been underway and is expected to complete the 1st half in 2026.

In 2021, the college applied to raise its official enrolment number from 670 to 760; the minister at first refused the request, but on appeal, reversed his decision. This allows the college to accept 130 year 8 students a year.

The college applied unsuccessfully in 2019 to use transfer tests to select the 35% of pupils it admits to the grammar stream in Year 8. It reapplied in January 2022.

== See also ==
- Education in Northern Ireland
- List of integrated schools in Northern Ireland
- List of secondary schools in Northern Ireland
