= Erne Integrated College =

Location
- Drumcoo; Enniskillen, County Fermanagh, BT74 4FY; Northern Ireland; 54.360°N 7.637°W

Information
- Established: 1994
- Local authority: WELB
- Management Team: Hannah Phillips VP Oonagh McCarney Mary Magee-Pakenham Ryan Thibodeau
- Principal: Darron McLaughlin
- Enrolment: 350
- Colours: Green, Black and Red
- Website: www.erneic.org.uk

Erne Integrated College is a co-educational integrated post-primary school located in Enniskillen, County Fermanagh, Northern Ireland; it lies within the Western Education and Library Board area.

== Context ==
Integrated Education is a Northern Ireland phenomenon, where traditionally schools were sectarian, either run as Catholic schools or Protestant schools. On parental request, a school could apply to "transition" to become Grant Maintained offering 30% of the school places to students from the minority community. Lagan College was the first integrated school to open in 1981.

Under the delegated Northern Ireland education system, the year groups are numbered differently to their English cousins. In England the first year is Reception, then comes Year 1, in Northern Ireland, reception is Year 1, and 11 year-olds transition to post-primary (secondary) into Year 8.

== Description ==
The college was formed in 1994 and after one year at a temporary campus in Silverhill, it moved to its present address at Drumcoo in the north-west of the town.

The college is non-selective and offers a full educational experience from A-levels to special needs.

In May 2023, nine out of eleven members of the school's board of governors resigned. This was soon followed by a statement from the PSNI, saying that the school was under investigation due to "a report of allegations of non-recent inappropriate behaviour". As of February 2024, the school's board of governors has 9 members.

== Academics ==
=== Key Stage 3 (Years 8, 9, 10) ===
The Key Stage 3 syllabus follows the guidelines set out in the Revised Curriculum for Northern Ireland.

=== Key Stage 4 (Years 11, 12) ===
In year 11, for Key Stage 4, students follow the Department of Education’s Entitlement Framework Curriculum, they are obliged to continue with core subjects augmented with options. The option choice will depend on their future aspirations as the choice of GCSE subjects will limit their Key Stage 5 (Years 13 and 14)A-level opportunities and their tertiary education.

The core subjects are Careers, Citizenship, English, Mathematics, Personal Development, Physical Education and Religious Studies. For options, a straw poll is conducted to see students wishes, and from that the staff devise the options blocks so choice is maximised, formal selection is then made.

Subjects offered at GCSE Level:

- Art
- Construction
- Drama/ Performing arts
- Geography
- English
- English Literature
- History
- Home Economics
- Hospitality
- Digital Technology
- Learning through Pokémon games
- LLW (Learning for Life and Work)
- Mathematics
- Music
- Performing Arts
- PE
- CPSW
- RE
- Science – Double and Single awards. Individual Sciences available on request
- Spanish
- Sports Studies
- Technology
- PAL
- Photography

=== Sixth form (Years 13, 14) ===
Subjects offered at A-Level:

- Art
- Life Sciences
- Geography
- History
- Mathematics (Further Maths available)
- Moving Image Arts
- Music
- Uniform Protective Services
- RE
- Spanish
- Sports Studies
- Technology
- Health & Social Care

== See also ==
- List of integrated schools in Northern Ireland
- List of secondary schools in Northern Ireland
- Education in Northern Ireland
