= Oakgrove Integrated College =

Location
- Stradreagh Gransha Park; Derry, County Londonderry, BT47 6TG; Northern Ireland; 55.018036°N 7.272705°W

Information
- Type: Grant Maintained Integrated
- Motto: Achieve, Learn, Believe Together
- Religious affiliation: Integrated
- Established: 1991; 35 years ago
- Status: Open
- Local authority: Education Authority
- Principal: Mr John Harkin
- Gender: Co-educational
- Enrolment: 590
- Capacity: 800
- Colour
- Website: www.oakgrovecollege.com

Oakgrove Integrated College is a grant maintained integrated secondary school in Derry, Northern Ireland.

== Context ==
Integrated Education is a Northern Ireland phenomenon, where traditionally schools were sectarian, either run as Catholic schools or Protestant schools. On as parental request, a school could apply to 'transition' to become Grant Maintained offering 30% of the school places to students from the minority community. Lagan College was the first integrated school to open in 1981.

As of 2024, students at Oakgrove were 15% Protestant, 68% Roman Catholic and 17% other.

== History ==
The college, which was formed with the hope of integrating young people from both sides of Northern Ireland's religious divide, opened in September 1991. Marie Cowan was the principal when it opened in the old Housing Executive offices at Limavady Road. It then moved to an old red brick building at the Gransha Hospital in September 1992. A new purpose-built facility, built at a cost of £9.7 million, was completed in 2004.

== See also ==
- List of integrated schools in Northern Ireland
- List of secondary schools in Northern Ireland
