= Ulidia Integrated College =

Location
- Victoria Road; Carrickfergus, Antrim; Northern Ireland; 54.731490°N 5.797137°W

Information
- Type: Integrated secondary school
- Motto: Educating together, Catholics and Protestants, and those of other religions, or none, in an atmosphere of understanding and tolerance to the highest academic standards.
- Established: 1997
- Local authority: NEELB
- Chair of Board of Governors: Walter Bleakley
- Principal: Michael Houston
- Staff: 60
- Gender: coeducational
- Age: 11 to 18
- Enrollment: 530+
- Website: http://www.ulidiacollege.com/

Ulidia Integrated College is situated in Carrickfergus, Northern Ireland. It was opened in 1997 with an initial 63 students. It is the 44th integrated school to be created in the province and provides education for over 530 Catholic and Protestant children.

== Context ==
Integrated Education is a Northern Ireland phenomenon, where traditionally schools were sectarian, either run as Catholic schools or Protestant schools. On as parental request, a school could apply to 'transition' to become Grant Maintained offering 30% of the school places to students from the minority community. Lagan College was the first integrated school to open in 1981.

Under the Education Reform Order (NI), 1989 a school wishing to obtain Grant Maintained Integrated status must convince the Department of Education that it can draw a minimum of 30% of its population from the minority tradition of the area it wishes to serve.

== Mission statement ==
Educating together, Catholics and Protestants, and those of other religions, or none, in an atmosphere of tolerance and understanding, to the highest possible academic standards.

== See also ==
- Carrickfergus Learning Community
- List of integrated schools in Northern Ireland
- List of secondary schools in Northern Ireland
