= Blackwater Integrated College =

Location
- 12 Old Belfast Road; Downpatrick, County Down, BT30 6SG; Northern Ireland
- Coordinates: 54.3388°N 5.7156°W

Information
- School type: Grant Maintained Integrated
- Motto: Building, Inspiring, Caring
- Established: 2008; 18 years ago
- Status: Open
- Local authority: Education Authority
- Principal: Mr Stephen Taylor
- Staff: 52
- Gender: Co-Educational
- Age: 11 to 16
- Enrollment: 283 (2024/25)
- Capacity: 400
- Colour
- Website: www.blackwateric.org

Blackwater Integrated College is an 11-16 secondary school on a restricted site with 283 pupils (as of 2025) and around 30 classrooms, however has the capacity for 400. Mr S Taylor is the school's current principal.

As of 2024, students at Blackwater Integrated College were 31% Protestant, 37% Roman Catholic and 32% other.

== History and future proposals ==
Blackwater Integrated College opened in September 2008. It was formed as a merger of Down Academy and Rowallane Integrated College. Down Academy had been formed when Killyleagh, Castlewellan, and Quoile High Schools amalgamated in 1991. Down Academy became a controlled integrated school in 1998. The Blackwater site was chosen for its central location.

In 2019 Blackwater was one of 22 school with sustainability issues with too few pupils to remain financially viable. The centre of school population is closer to Belfast, and additional capacity is needed to support students who failed to get a place at Lagan College.

A period of consultation on the school's future ended 3 June 2021. With the support of the college, a new integrated college with an admission number of 100 was planned to open on a different site Mid Down Integrated College on 1 September 2023 and Blackwater Integrated College will close on or shortly after 31 August 2023. This was not met due to no site being allocated. A new date has not been proposed yet.

== Academics ==
The school is small so a single child can distort the statistic. It fares well in inspections, and its year 12 results were above average for two of the last three reported years.

== See also ==
- List of integrated schools in Northern Ireland
- List of secondary schools in Northern Ireland
- Education in Northern Ireland
