= Shimna Integrated College =

Location
- The Lawnfield; King Street; Newcastle, County Down, BT33 0HD; Northern Ireland; 54.198798°N 5.890528°W

Information
- Type: Integrated secondary school
- Motto: Learning from each other
- Religious affiliation: Mixed
- Established: 1994
- Local authority: SEELB
- Principal: Steve Pagan
- Gender: Mixed
- Age: 11 to 18
- Enrolment: 531
- Website: https://www.shimnaintegratedcollege.org/

Shimna Integrated College is an integrated secondary school based in Newcastle, County Down, Northern Ireland. The all-ability school was founded in 1994 with the hope of integrating young people from both sides of Northern Ireland's religious divide and giving all of its students 'self-esteem'.

== Context ==
Integrated Education is a Northern Ireland phenomenon, where traditionally schools were segregated, either run as Catholic schools or Protestant schools. On parental request, a school could apply to 'transition' to become Grant Maintained offering 30% of the school places to students from the minority community. Lagan College was the first integrated school to open in 1981.

== History ==
It opened in September 1994 with 60 pupils. In March 2011, Shimna became the first school in Northern Ireland to organize a gay-straight alliance.

== Site ==
The original buildings were replaced with a £16.5m three storey building that meets 2021 design requirements. The plans were approved at the planning committee meeting in April 2021 with completion estimated for September 2023

== Notable former pupils ==
- Patrick Brown, politician
- Dara McAnulty, naturalist and writer

== See also ==
- List of integrated schools in Northern Ireland
- List of secondary schools in Northern Ireland
