= Integrated College Dungannon =

Integrated secondary school in Dungannon, Northern Ireland

Location
- Gortmerron Link Road; Dungannon, County Tyrone, BT71 6LS; Northern Ireland; 54.4942°N 6.7528°W

Information
- Type: Grant Maintained Integrated secondary
- Motto: Learning Together
- Established: September 1995
- Local authority: SELB
- Principal: Andrew Sleeth
- Staff: 78
- Gender: Male and Female
- Age: 11 to 18
- Enrolment: 640
- Colours: Green, Red and Yellow
- Publication: Public School
- Website: http://www.intcollege.co.uk/

Integrated College Dungannon (ICD) is an integrated secondary school situated in Dungannon, County Tyrone and is attended by students from ages 11–18. It is an all-ability College including grammar entry. It has been open since 1995.

== Context ==
Integrated Education is a Northern Ireland phenomenon, where traditionally schools were sectarian, either run as Catholic schools or Protestant schools. On as parental request, a school could apply to 'transition' to become Grant Maintained offering 30% of the school places to students from the minority community. Lagan College was the first integrated school to open in 1981.

== History ==
Many pupils transferred from the Armagh Integrated College when it closed in 2009.

== Site ==
The college has been enhanced with a new £2.3m sports hall. It was designed by Mc Adam Design architects and delivered by Woodvale Construction. The site has an accredited 3G pitch.

== Notable former pupil ==
- Colin Morgan, film, television, theatre and radio actor

== See also ==
- List of integrated schools in Northern Ireland
- List of secondary schools in Northern Ireland
