= Fort Hill Integrated College =

Location
- Belfast Road, Lisburn; Lisburn; Northern Ireland; 54.5153°N 6.0314°W

Information
- Type: Controlled integrated
- Established: 1958
- School number: 4250072
- Principal: Colin Millar
- Grades: 8-14
- Area: Lisburn
- Colors: Navy and Green
- Website: forthillcollege.co.uk

Fort Hill Integrated College is an Integrated College in Lisburn, Northern Ireland, located on the Belfast Road. The principal of the school is Mr. Colin Millar. The school crest depicts keys representing opening the doors of knowledge: academic, personal, social, cultural, emotional and spiritual.

== Context ==
Integrated Education is a Northern Ireland phenomenon, where traditionally schools were sectarian, either run as Catholic schools or Protestant schools. On as parental request, a school could apply to 'transition' to become Grant Maintained offering 30% of the school places to students from the minority community. Lagan College was the first integrated school to open in 1981. A small number of existing controlled schools have had their status changed by the local authority becoming 'controlled integrated schools'.

== Fort Hill Integrated College Ethos ==
The School's Ethos is a list of its values that spell H.E.A.R.T., which stands for: Honesty, Effort, Attitude, Respect, Tolerance. The 2 keys in the School Crest represent opening the doors of knowledge; Academic, Personal, Social, Cultural, Emotional and Spiritual.

== History ==
The school opened as a girls' high school in 1958, later it became mixed and was re-designated as an integrated school. They work collaborative on 'Shared Education' projects with St Colm's High School

== Notable staff ==
In 2017, a school nurse, Eileen McConnell, was the runner-up in the British Heart Foundation Professional Award 2017. Currently, CPR training is being given to staff and pupils of the school to establish an education on how to save someone's life through CPR.

== See also ==
- List of integrated schools in Northern Ireland
- List of secondary schools in Northern Ireland
- Education in Northern Ireland
