= Drumragh Integrated College =

Location
- Coordinates: 54.587°N 7.274°W

Drumragh Integrated College is an integrated mixed-religion, non-selective secondary school for girls and boys aged from 11 to 18, located at 70 Crevenagh Road,. The school recently celebrated their 30th anniversary of being open. Omagh, County Tyrone, Northern Ireland.

== Context ==
Integrated Education is a Northern Ireland phenomenum, where traditionally schools were sectarian, either run as Catholic schools or Protestant schools. On a parental request, a school could apply to 'transition' to become Grant Maintained offering 30% of the school places to students from the minority community. Lagan College was the first integrated school to open in 1981.

== Description ==
The school had 580 pupils in 2018, with approval to expand to 645 pupils and is within the Western Education and Library Board area. Drumragh College received funding of 20 million pounds for new school facilities in 2001 while it was located at the side of the old Tyrone and Fermanagh Hospital. The new modern school started construction in 2007 and was finished in 2009. A plan to expand the school's size Area for more pupils to attend the school was proposed in September 2012 but it was refused by the Minister Of Education.

== Staff ==
The current principal is Imelda C Kirk. The school consists of up to 25 teachers in different departments that consist from ICT, Music, H.E, English, Math and History and so forth. Shaun McBride is the chairman of the school's Board of Governors.

== Notable former pupils ==
Janet Devlin: song artist who came 5th in the X-factor in 2011.

== See also ==
- List of integrated schools in Northern Ireland
- List of secondary schools in Northern Ireland
- Education in Northern Ireland
