= Parkhall Integrated College =

Location
- Antrim, County Antrim; Northern Ireland
- Coordinates: 54.721°N 6.211°W

Information
- Type: Secondary
- Religious affiliation: Integrated
- Established: 1971
- School board: Education Authority
- Head teacher: N. OWEN
- Gender: Mixed
- Age range: 11-18
- Enrollment: 1,100
- Website: https://parkhallintegratedcollege.org/

Parkhall Integrated College is an integrated co-educational non-selective secondary school in Antrim, County Antrim, Northern Ireland. There are 1,100 students aged between 11 and 18, that is in Year 8 to Year 14.

== Context ==
Integrated Education is a Northern Ireland phenomenon, where traditionally schools were sectarian, either run as Catholic schools or Protestant schools. On as parental request, a school could apply to 'transition' to become Grant Maintained offering 30% of the school places to students from the minority community. Lagan College was the first integrated school to open in 1981.

== Facilities ==
The college re-located from two sites to a single modern facility in 2018. There is a wide range of indoor and outdoor sporting facilities. There is also a youth and community wing.

== Activities ==
In the 2012 London Olympics torch relay the Principal's secretary carried the torch through Antrim.

== See also ==
- List of integrated schools in Northern Ireland
- List of secondary schools in Northern Ireland
- Education in Northern Ireland
