= Controlled Schools' Support Council =

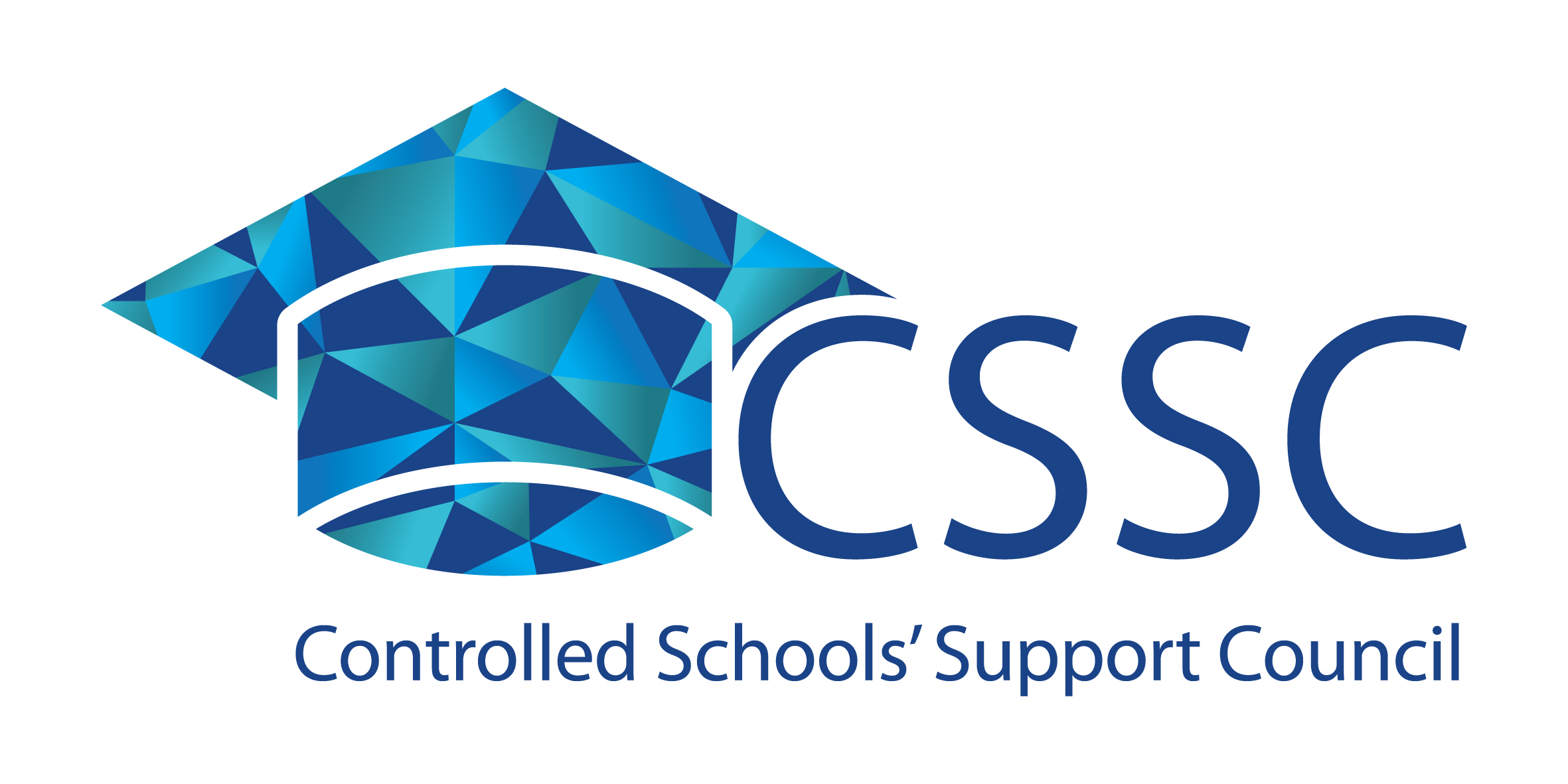
- CSSC Logo
- Formation: Established September 1, 2016; 9 years ago
- Type: Non-statutory body
- Headquarters: Second Floor, Main Building, Stranmillis University College, Stranmillis Road, Belfast, BT9 5DY
- Chief Executive: Mark Baker
- Website: http://www.csscni.org.uk

The Controlled Schools’ Support Council (CSSC) is a non-statutory body, currently classified as a Third Sector Organisation, providing services in supporting and representing the controlled schools sector in Northern Ireland.

== Education in Northern Ireland ==
Northern Ireland has a complex educational structure with a range of bodies involved in its management and administration. Schools in Northern Ireland fall under two categories - grant-aided and independent. While nearly all are grant-aided, there are some independent schools. All children between the ages of 4 and 16 are entitled to a free school place.

=== The controlled schools sector ===
According to figures from the Department of Education for 2016/2017 there are 560 controlled schools, 48% of the total number of schools registered in Northern Ireland making it the largest education sector in Northern Ireland. The modern controlled schools sector is a large, diverse and distinctive education system. Controlled schools (nursery, primary, special, secondary and grammar schools) are managed by the school's board of governors and the employing authority is the Education Authority (EA).

Although many of these schools were originally Protestant church schools, whose control was transferred to the state in the first half of the twentieth century, they are open to those of all faiths and none.

The controlled sector is

- Church related
- Diverse in provision and governance
- Inclusive in making provision for children and young people from all backgrounds
- Aspirational in seeking to provide the best possible education

== Formation of the CSSC ==
After a thorough review of Education Administration in Northern Ireland, in October 2014 an Education Bill was put before the assembly, which created the Education Authority.Alongside this the Minister and the Northern Ireland Executive agreed to establish and fund a support body for schools in the controlled sector, there had been no specific support for the controlled sector over the previous 30 years, whilst other educational sectors had support bodies, such as CCMS, NICIE and CnaG.

Given this lack of support for the controlled sector, there are legacy issues which the Controlled Schools’ Support Council (CSSC) will seek to address, especially in the areas of ethos, representation and advocacy.

The CSSC became operational on 1 September 2016. Education Minister Peter Weir said

“This is an historic day for education in Northern Ireland. The establishment of the Controlled Schools’ Support Council will help to address a longstanding deficit in representation. It will place the controlled sector on a similar footing with the other sectors in education. The new CSSC will ensure the sector has a strong and effective voice. I am confident that they will make a positive contribution in helping to raise educational standards across the controlled sector. This is an important step towards greater equality and fairness in education"

The Board of Directors, representing schools, the Transferor Representatives’ Council and those from a public appointments process were officially elected at the inaugural AGM on 8 March 2017, and will serve for four years. This new council took over from the interim board, a ten-person working group chaired by Uel McCrea, which spent four years developing the vision and setting up an effective support organisation for controlled schools.

== CSSC Key Functions ==
The CSSC endeavours to enhance the quality of educational provision within the controlled sector, by advocating on behalf of controlled schools and supporting schools to raise standards of achievement, while working in constructive partnership with schools, the Department of Education, the Education Authority and other sectoral bodies.

The CSSC seeks to support the interest of the controlled sector through five key functions

- Advocacy - on behalf of individual schools and the wider controlled sector
- Ethos – to develop and maintain the ethos of the controlled sector
- Governance – to support the Education Authority regarding the appointment and training of governors
- Raising standards – to assist schools to further raise levels of achievement
- Area planning – to participate in planning of the controlled schools’ estate
