= Lismore College (Northern Ireland) =

School in Craigavon, Northern Ireland

Location
- Monbrief Road, Monbrief, Craigavon, BT65 5EQ; Northern Ireland; 54.44493°N 6.35901°W

Information
- Religious affiliation: Roman Catholic
- Established: 1972
- Local authority: Education Authority (Southern)
- Principal: Shauna Lennon
- Age: 11 to 18
- Enrollment: 1159
- Colour
- Website: www.lismorecollege.co.uk

Lismore College (formerly Lismore Comprehensive School) is a secondary-school located in Craigavon, County Armagh, Northern Ireland. It is a Catholic maintained school and was opened in 1972. The name comes from the Irish Lios Mór, meaning 'great ringfort'; referring to the remains of a Medieval ringfort that used to lie within the school grounds, constructed sometime between 900 and 1200.

== Facilities ==
Lismore applied for a new building as the original building was designed to accommodate 300 pupils and the school has since grown to over 1,000 pupils. Approval was given in 2014 for the building of a new school, which was fully completed in 2024.
