= St Patrick's College, Banbridge =

Coordinates: 54.3498°N 6.2835°W

St. Patrick's College

Location
- Scarva Road; Banbridge, County Down, BT32 3AS; Northern Ireland

Information
- Motto: Excellence through Partnership
- Religious affiliation: Catholic
- Established: 1958
- Local authority: Education Authority (Southern)
- Principal: Roisin Woods
- Staff: 60
- Gender: Mixed
- Age: 11 to 18
- Enrolment: 500 (approx)
- Colour
- Website: https://www.stpatrickscollegebanbridge.com/

St Patrick's College (Irish: Coláiste Phádraig Droichead na Banna) is a Catholic maintained secondary school located in Banbridge, County Down, Northern Ireland.

== History ==
The foundation stone for St. Patrick's Intermediate School was laid on 1 May 1957 by Bishop O'Doherty and the school received its first pupils in September 1958. Its name was changed to St. Patrick's High School in 1972 as a result of the raising of the school-leaving age. It was again changed to St. Patrick's College to reflect the increased numbers of students staying on to complete their GCSE A-Levels.

== Facilities ==
In October 2020, a full-size 3G GAA pitch with floodlights and changing rooms was added to the school's sporting facilities. This was funded by a grant of £1.5 million from several agencies including Peace4Youth, the Armagh, Banbridge and Craigavon District Council and Sport Northern Ireland.

== Academics ==
The full range of subjects is offered. At GCSE A-level, students can choose from geography, art, biology, technology and design, English literature, psychology, drama and theatre studies, software systems and development, chemistry, agriculture, history, journalism, physics, government and politics, and religious studies. They can also take a BTEC Level 3 National Diploma in information technology, engineering, childcare, performing arts, public services, media and sport.

The college has been previously named best performing non-selective school in County Down. It has also been listed as among the top ten non-grammar schools in Northern Ireland.

== Shared education ==
The college works in partnership with the neighbouring Banbridge High School to offer a number of shared activities as part of the curriculum. It is also part of the Banbridge Area Learning Community co-ordinated by the Southern Regional College.

== Extra-curricular ==
The college offers the opportunity to participate in various sporting activities including swimming, netball, Gaelic football (boys and girls), camogie, hurling, rugby, basketball, dance, and athletics. The college has an active music programme including opportunities for singing and musical instruments.

== Awards ==
In 2020, the college was awarded Intermediate level of the British Council's International School Award in recognition of its work to bring the world into the classroom.

== See also ==
- List of secondary schools in Northern Ireland
