= Robert Sloan =

Robert Sloan may refer to:

- Robert Sloan (footballer) (born 1983), Scottish footballer
- Robert Sloan (baseball) (1889–1951), American Negro league outfielder
- Robert B. Sloan (born 1949), American academic and theologian
- Bob Sloan (born 1940), Northern Irish sculptor and artist
