= New-Bridge Integrated College =

Integrated secondary school in Loughbrickland, Northern Ireland

Location
- 25 Donard View Road; Loughbrickland, County Down, BT32 3LN; Ireland
- Coordinates: 54.3182°N 6.3101°W

Information
- Type: Integrated secondary school
- Motto: "The School for All the Family"
- Established: 1995
- Founder: Mario F MacBlain
- Principal: Anne Anderson
- Staff: ~100
- Gender: Co-educational
- Age: 11 to 18
- Enrolment: ~650
- Colours: Black, white, purple & dark green
- Houses: Mourne, Bann, Bovenett & Briciru
- Website: https://newbridgeintegrated.org

New-Bridge Integrated College is an integrated secondary school founded in 1995 for children in Newry and Banbridge, hence the name New(ry)-(Ban)Bridge. New-Bridge was established in the rural village of Loughbrickland, Northern Ireland so that it was neither in Banbridge nor Newry, it is in a small village called Loughbrickland which is 11.7 miles from Newry and less than 3.6 miles from Banbridge.

Pupils travel to the school from a wide area of Counties Down and Armagh. When New-Bridge was founded it was considered that the school would only have an attendance of around 390. Due to its popularity and growth, New Bridge now has an attendance rate of over 650 per year, and the school continues to grow.

In 2000, the school began to cater for sixth form education, enabling students to be taught beyond GCSE standard at the school.

== See also ==
- List of integrated schools in Northern Ireland
- List of secondary schools in Northern Ireland
