= Integrated Education Bill (Northern Ireland) =

Private Member's Bill of Northern Ireland

The Integrated Education Bill is a private member's bill that was proposed by Kellie Armstrong of the Alliance Party of Northern Ireland.

The bill completed Final Stage in the NI Assembly on 9 March 2022./

== Reactions ==
=== Support ===
Amanda McNamee, principal of Lagan College, supported the bill to parents of pupils, saying it will "provide genuine and much needed choice" to parents. She said that she supports "parental choice" and meeting the demand for integrated education. She also said that the bill would not "damage and limit other schools".

Both the SDLP and Sinn Féin support the bill.

=== Criticism ===
In July 2021 John O'Dowd of Sinn Féin said during the second stage debates of the Integrated Education Bill that while integrated schools promote inclusivity "there's only one or very few play Gaelic games. There's none promote the Irish language. I will correct myself: I think that there is one. The identity in it is not neutral - in many of them it is British." He also said "You can pay homage to the Crown but to no-one else". He said that he supported the principle of the bill but urged the integrated sector to "get its head around" how it promotes "all identities". He also said "The reason why we have such a separated education system dating back to the 1920s - and I am no defender of the Catholic hierarchy - is because the Catholic Church took a very strong view of this," he told committee members. That to keep Irish identity, Irish culture alive in a partitioned state, it would have to have its own education system."

Kellie Armstrong replied that she had never seen that in any integrated school she had visited. She said "In the integrated schools that I go into, I see a culture that is reflective of everyone who attends there and is respectful of all cultures." Regarding promoting the Irish language and Gaelic games she said "I'm somewhat at a loss given the fact that Lagan College and Drumragh Integrated College have both been former winners of the JJ Reilly Cup. Kellie Armstrong says all cultures are respected through integrated education My own daughter played hurling for her integrated college."

She also said "Irish culture is not eroded, neither is British culture. Integrated education isn't about assimilating young people into one culture - it's about celebrating all cultures."

During Final Stage debate on the 9th March 2022, Mr O’Dowd confirmed “ During the Second Stage debate, I made comments about GAA sports and the Irish language that were unfair to the integrated sector. I put on record my apologies for those comments. In the heat of debate, I went too far, but I can now support the Bill at Final Stage”.

The Democratic Unionist Party tabled a petition of concern to oppose the bill in March 2022, before the final reading of the bill. Diane Dodds of the DUP claimed it would be a"dereliction of duty to 93% of pupils in Northern Ireland" if other MLAs opposed to "segregation and elevation of one sector of our education system" didn't sign it. She said it was "bad law" and "I want to see children educated together but this Bill will penalise controlled and maintained schools because they have the wrong sign above the door not because of any failing with inclusion."

Pat Sheehan of Sinn Féin described the actions of the DUP as a "shameful stunt". He said "It’s shameful that the DUP is trying to use the Petition of Concern to block a Bill on integrated education. The irony is, the DUP are using a mechanism which has not been deployed in this mandate in an effort to prevent children being educated together. This is yet another example of the DUP’s opposition to progressive change."

The DUP and TUV signed the Petition of Concern but failed to achieve the 30 signatures required to halt the progress of the Bill.

== Vote ==
The Ulster Unionist Party did not support the petition of concern but opposed the bill.

The bill was passed 49 votes to 38.
