= Slemish College =

Location
- Larne Road; Ballymena, County Antrim; Northern Ireland; 54.855643°N 6.25965°W

Information
- Type: Integrated secondary school
- Established: 1996
- Local authority: NEELB
- Specialist: Humanities College
- Principal: Michael Bennett
- Gender: Co-educational
- Age: 11 to 18
- Enrolment: 748
- Houses: Gall, Comgall, Ultan & Lorcán, Faber, Beryn
- Colours: Turquoise and yellow
- Website: http://www.slemishcollege.org.uk/

Slemish College is a co-educational integrated secondary school in Ballymena, Northern Ireland.

There are six houses at Slemish College. Ultan, Comgall, Gall and Lorcan, which have been present since the beginning of the house system, and Beryan and Faber, houses added in 2025.

The college is named after Slemish Mountain near Ballymena in mid-Antrim, which tradition suggests was home to Saint Patrick during his youth.

== Context ==
Integrated Education is a Northern Ireland phenomenon, where traditionally schools were sectarian, either run as Catholic schools (Maintained) or Protestant schools (Controlled). On a parental request, a school could apply to 'transition' to become Grant Maintained (Integrated school) which would offer 30% of the school places to students from the minority community. Lagan College was the first integrated school to open in 1981.

Under the delegated Northern Ireland education system, the year groups are numbered differently to their English cousins. In England the first year is Reception, then comes Year 1, in Education in Northern Ireland, reception is year 0, then Primary 1 and 11 year-olds transition to post-primary (secondary) into Year 8.

== History ==
Ballymena parents had established integrated primary schools, and wanted their children to complete their education in an integrated schools. A steering group formed in 1994, and support was received from NICIE on condition that 80 children could be found. Ballymena and particularly Harryville Chapel had been a point of conflict during The Troubles. The violence did not stop until The Good Friday Agreement was signed in 1998. Slemish first opened its doors in September 1996 with 84 pupils. The school takes in 120 new students every year. It was one of the most oversubscribed schools in Northern Ireland by 2001. In June 2008 the college was given specialist school status in the area of the Humanities (Geography and English). It is the first specialist school in the Ballymena area and one of only three schools in the province to specialise in humanities.

== See also ==
- The Troubles in Ballymena
- List of integrated schools in Northern Ireland
- List of secondary schools in Northern Ireland
