= Belfast Model School for Girls =

All-girls' school in Belfast, Northern Ireland

Coordinates: 54.624°N 5.957°W

Information
- Gender: Girls
- Website: belfastgms.org/site/

Belfast Model School for Girls is an all-girls' school in Belfast, Northern Ireland. Also Known as "G.M.S" (Girls Model School). In 2006, the school was granted specialist school status for ICT, one of only 12 schools in Northern Ireland to achieve this. It is within the Belfast Region of the Education Authority (formerly the Belfast Education and Library Board.

In 2020, the school was a recipient a donation of 45 (out of a total of 225) laptops from the Belfast Charitable Society, jointly with the Halifax Foundation and the Irish National Lottery Community Fund. The laptops were donated to assist with home-schooling during the COVID-19 pandemic.
