= North Coast Integrated College =

Location
- 55.1426°N 6.6525°W

Information
- Website: www.ncic.org.uk/

North Coast Integrated College, Cloyfin Road, Coleraine, County Londonderry, Northern Ireland is an integrated co-educational non-selective secondary school. Angela Passmore is the school's current principal. The school has now merged with Coleraine College and Dunluce Secondary School to form Causeway Academy leaving only their Year 11 and 12 pupils in the school to then fully merge with Causeway Academy. All Year 8-10 past pupils of NCIC have now moved to Causeway Academy as of 2026

== Context ==
Integrated Education is a Northern Ireland phenomenon, where traditionally schools were sectarian, either run as Catholic schools or Protestant schools. On as parental request, a school could apply to 'transition' to become Grant Maintained offering 30% of the school places to students from the minority community. Lagan College was the first integrated school to open in 1981.

== History ==
North Coast Integrated College opened in 1996 as an integrated, co- educational,all-ability school available to all without fees or entrance examinations. It is a Grant Maintained Integrated (GMI) School: GMI status is a result of the 1989 Education Reform (NI) Order.

The school was inspected in November 2012, ETI described the context of the school:

"North Coast Integrated College draws most of its pupils from the town of Coleraine. The school is working in challenging circumstances: there is a downward trend in the year 8 intake, a significant number of pupils have a range of complex social, emotional and learning issues, key stage (KS) 2 outcomes for pupils entering the school are low and there is a high and growing percentage of pupils entitled to free school meals, which is almost half of the pupils in years 8-12 in the current academic year"

Having accepted that, the report published in April 2013 castigated the school for the youngsters final results. This, and the 21 week delay in publishing the report demoralised the staff. The school made a statement to the Northern Ireland Assembly ETI inquiry questioning:

"whether ETI properly assesses the value-added in those schools which have lower levels of examination attainment"

Less than 5% of year 8 pupils entered the college with the baseline Level 5 maths or Level 5 English, however 57% of year 11 youngsters in 2010, 61% in 2011, and 70% in 2012 achieved the baseline 5 GCSE passes at C and above.

== See also ==
- List of integrated schools in Northern Ireland
- List of secondary schools in Northern Ireland
- Education in Northern Ireland
