= Ken Goodall =

GB Lions rugby union & rugby league footballer

Personal information
- Full name: Kenneth George Goodall
- Born: 12 February 1947 Derry, County Londonderry, N.Ireland
- Died: 17 August 2006 (aged 59)

Playing information

Rugby union
Representative
Years	Team	Pld	T	G	FG	P
1968	British & Irish Lions	0	0	0	0	0

Rugby league
Club
Years	Team	Pld	T	G	FG	P
1970–74	Workington Town	82	25	0	0	75
- As of 27 May 2021

Ken Goodall was an Irish rugby union and rugby league player (12 February 1947 – 17 August 2006), He was an Irish international and British Lions player and vice principal at Faughan Valley High School, which is now part of Lisneal College. He switched codes in 1970 to play for the Cumbrian rugby league club, Workington Town.

He was educated at Foyle College and then read chemical engineering at Newcastle University. He made his début on the rugby pitch in a match against Australia on 21 January 1967 and subsequently played for Ireland in 18 of the next 19 matches (missing only Ireland’s Grand Slam decider against Wales in 1969) until 14 March 1970.

He was a member of City of Derry R.F.C., played for Newcastle University, club rugby for Winlaton Vulcans RFC in West Gateshead before playing for Workington. Between 1970 and 1974, Goodall played 82 matches for Town, scoring 25 tries.

He was reintroduced to rugby union and was reinstated by the Irish Rugby Football Union when the game became professional.
