= St Patrick's College, Ballymena =

Coordinates: 54.8747°N 6.2650°W

St. Patrick College, Ballymena

Location
- Broughshane Road; Ballymena, County Antrim, BT43 7DZ; Northern Ireland

Information
- Type: non-selective
- Motto: Ad Majorem Dei Gloriam (for the greater glory of God)
- Religious affiliation: Catholic
- Established: 1959
- Local authority: Education Authority (Belfast)
- Staff: 60
- Gender: Girls and Boys
- Age: 11 to 18
- Enrolment: 760 (approx)
- Colour
- Website: https://stpatricksballymena.com/

St Patrick's College is a Catholic maintained co-educational school located in Ballymena, County Antrim, Northern Ireland.

== History ==
The school was opened on 8 September 1959 by Dr Daniel Mageean, Bishop of the Roman Catholic Diocese of Down and Connor. It was known then as St Patrick's Voluntary Secondary Intermediate School. As the school grew in size and pupils stayed on post-16, it changed its name to St. Patrick's College offering a broader range of courses.

== College Motto ==
On the college badge are the letters A.M.D.G.. This is an abbreviation of Ad Majorem Dei Gloriam which can be translated as For the greater glory of God.

== Academics ==
A full range of subjects is offered at GCSE, A-Level and BTEC. At GCSE A-level, the students can choose courses from Applied Art & Design, English, Applied Health & Social Care, History, ICT, Performing Arts, Polish and Religious Studies. As part of the Ballymena Learning Together consortium of schools students can access optional courses in Applied Business, Chemistry, Environmental Technology, Government & Politics, Engineering, Moving Image Arts, Psychology, Physics, Business Studies, Drama, Geography, Mathematics, Music, and Sociology. They can also access several BTEC courses.

With the arrival of the children of immigrants from Eastern Europe, the school has appointed Polish teachers and Czech, Romanian and Bulgarian teaching assistants. Students are now able to take GCSE courses in Polish.

== Sports ==
The students have the opportunity of participating in such sports as badminton, volleyball, Gaelic football, soccer, camogie, and hurling.

== Principals ==
- 1959 - 1981 Mr Seamus McCracken
- 1981 - 1986 Mr P O'Hagan
- 1986 - 1989 Mr M McCrory
- 1989 - 1993 Mr D Gillan
- 1993 - 2004 Mr L Raven
- 2004 - 2017 Mrs Catherine Magee
- 2017 – 2023 Dr Martin Knox.
- 2023–Present Mr P Fitzpatrick

== Notable alumni ==
- Liam Neeson - actor
- Brendan Rodgers - footballer and football manager

== See also ==
- List of secondary schools in Belfast
- List of secondary schools in Northern Ireland
