= Bob Sloan =

Sculptor and painter from Northern Ireland

Bob Sloan HRUA, ARBS
- Born: 10 April 1940 (age 86); Belfast
- Education: Belfast College of Art
- Alma mater: Central School of Art & Design
- Known for: Sculpture & education
- Style: Abstract
- Website: http://www.bobsloan.org/index.htm

Bob Sloan HRUA, ARBS (1940– ) is a Northern Irish sculptor, painter, performance and installation artist. He is an Academician of the Royal Ulster Academy of Arts where he has won numerous silver and gold medals at their annual shows. Sloan has exhibited internationally, and is known primarily for his sculptural works. Amongst his professional achievements he acted as a Director of the Sculptors Society of Ireland between 1988 and 1991. In the 1970s Sloan set-up an art foundry in his studeoSloan has influenced several generations of young artists in his role as educator.

== Early life ==
Robert W Sloan was born in Belfast on 10 April 1940 to a father who was an upholsterer and a mother who was a school cook. He was raised on Apsley Street near the Donegall Pass and the Ormeau Road areas of Belfast. Sloan cites his earliest influences as watching blacksmiths shoeing horses, repairing harnesses and cart wheels. He attended Annadale Grammar School from 1952 to 1959, where he was taught by Kenneth Jamison who was later to become the Director of the Arts Council of Northern Ireland.

Sloan was trained at the Belfast College of Art between 1959 and 1963, under Romeo Toogood, Tom Carr, John Luke and David Heminsley. He then attended Central School of Art in London from 1963 to 1964 under William Turnbull and Warren Davis. Whilst in London he acquainted himself with many of the leading commercial galleries of the time including Gimpel Fils, and Waddingtons. He also visited public institutions such as the Tate Gallery where he was inspired by a Picasso sculpture and Degas' Little Dancer. Unable to afford to complete his course at Central School of Art, he found part-time work as teacher. Sloan met his future wife Vicky at this time, whom he married a short time thereafter.

== Career ==
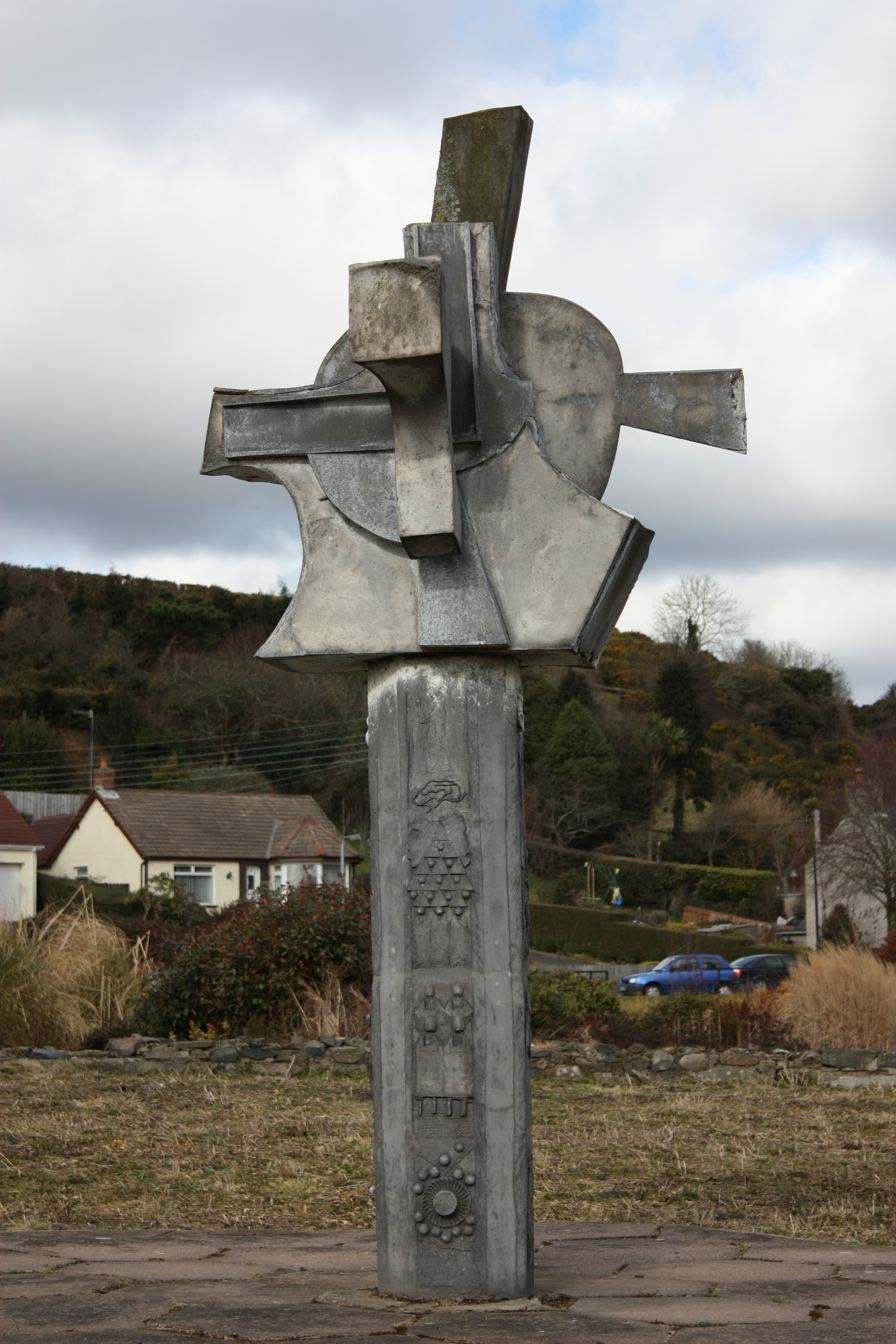
Downpatrick High Cross (1982)

In 1965 Sloan returned to Northern Ireland to take up an offer of employment at Lisnagarvey High School in Lisburn. At the same time he opened a studio in a basement on Bridge Street in the town, and he began showing his work in exhibitions. He retained this studio until 1969 when he relocated to Carryduff. He was appointed Head of Art at Parkhall School, Antrim in 1971, a position he held until 1974. Sloan was appointed as lecturer at the Ulster Polytechnic at Jordanstown in 1974.

Sloan held a three-person show at the Arts Council of Northern Ireland Gallery in 1974 where he showed drawings and pastels, which one critic labelled as "unresolved and overworked". Fellow exhibitors were Lawson Burch and Vernon Carter. Disappointed by the lack of casting facilities in Northern Ireland, Sloan set-up his own casting facilities in the late 1970s, which he maintained until 1982. Several trips to North America, including visits to the Tenth International Sculpture Conference in Toronto in 1978, the Foundry Workshop, Baltimore in 1980, and the Washington Sculpture Conference in the same year, inspired Sloan to expand his foundry with financial assistance provided by the Arts Council of Northern Ireland. His American excursions also exposed Sloan to new influences in large sculptural works by Nancy Holt, Richard Serra and Mark Di Suvero. Sloan participated in the Ulster Workshop at Documenta 6, Kassel, Germany in 1977, with performance and installation work. In 1979 Sloan debuted with the Independent Artists where he showed two works, an aluminium piece entitled Even Smaller Dancer, and Confined in cast brass. In the following year he showed at the Oireachtas for the first time with Crois Cheilteach.

In 1982 Sloan had two solo exhibitions, at the Arts Council of Northern Ireland Gallery which showed some of his site-specific works developed at Jordanstown, and at the Tom Caldwell Gallery, a commercial gallery in Dublin. The Arts Council show closed prematurely after a one hundred pound car bomb was detonated nearby causing structural damage to the building and Sloan's work, on a day which saw six other bombs explode across the Province claiming two lives. His civic commission of a metal cross in Downpatrick had been unveiled in the previous month, on 17 March 1982.

Sloan had solo shows with several independent galleries through the nineteen-eighties, including the Fenderesky and the Octagon in Belfast, and the Peacock, Craigavon in successive years from 1984 to 1986.

Sloan has been a regular contributor to the Royal Ulster Academy of Arts annual exhibitions since 1982. He was awarded the Academy's silver medal in 1983, and twice awarded the gold medal in 1990 and 1999. Sloan's Self-Portrait in wax and lead was awarded £250 and the Best Self-Portrait Prize in 1998, for what one critic called "a stunning achievement mixing wit, observation, perception and technical elan." Sloan was elected an Associate of the Royal Ulster Academy in 1990, before gaining promotion to honorary Academician in 1995. He occupied the office of Director with the Sculptors' Society of Ireland between 1988 and 1991, with whom he also exhibits. The Garter Lane One Gallery in Waterford held a retrospective of Sloan's sculptural works in 1991.

Sloan was one of sixteen Belfast artists invited to show at the Waterfront Hall as part of the Belfast Arts Festival in 2001. Side By Side was part of an arts enterprise originating from Atlantic Bridges, organised by twin cities Belfast, and Nashville. Two years later Sloan received a civic commission destined for a sculpture trail, by the offices of Lisburn City Council on the banks of the River Lagan. Tree of Dreams is a nine metre stainless steel sculpture holding five thousand copper leaves, inscribed with the hopes and wishes of residents from across the wider Lisburn area.

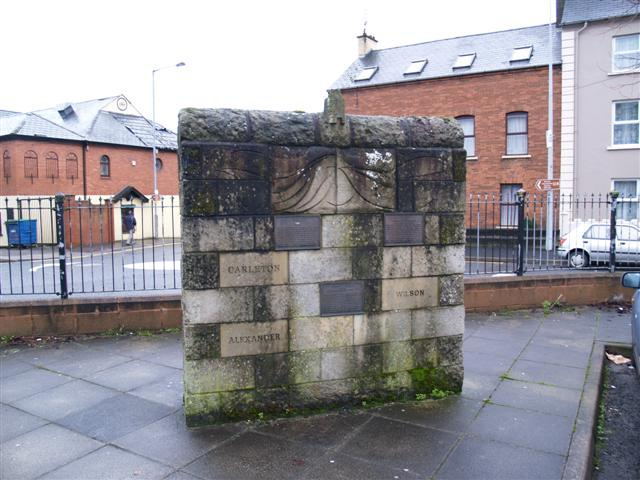
Bob Sloan sculpture at Bowling Green, Strabane

Amongst his group shows in the last decade was A Northern Light, a multimedia show at the Kenny Gallery, Galway, where he showed with his Northern Irish contemporaries, including Richard Croft, Betty Brown and the McWilliams, Catherine and Joe.

Sloan is to the left of the political spectrum, an artist who no longer enjoys exhibiting or opening nights, whom prefers to please himself, working in ways that suit him. Sloan describes his work as follows:

"I'm afraid my art is a bit like the Princess and the Pea -uneasy- if likened to an armchair I suspect there's something lurking in the cushion, about to bite me in the arse"

John Hewitt summarized Sloan's work in 1977,

"His cast metal pieces show the relationship of the nature of the medium, the surface textures and problems of weight and balance. His large constructed pieces...open up the sculptural space and to show the inherent nature of the actual materials and how they work with and against each other...Tension is integral to these works."

Bob Sloan continues to produce work from his studio in Carryduff, on the outskirts of Belfast.

== Legacy ==
Sloan's work can be seen in many national and international collections including the Ulster Museum, Arts Council of Northern Ireland, Arts Council of Ireland and the National Self Portrait Collection of Ireland and the Royal Ulster Academy Diploma Collection.
