= Coleraine College =

Secondary school in Londonderry, Northern Ireland

Coordinates: 55.134°N 6.683°W

- Coleraine, County Londonderry; Northern Ireland

Information
- Type: Secondary school
- Established: September 2001; 24 years ago
- Head teacher: Madame Skobel
- Enrollment: 233

Coleraine College is a secondary school in Coleraine, County Londonderry, Northern Ireland. It was formed by an amalgamation of the Coleraine Boys' Secondary school and Coleraine Girls' Secondary School and became Coleraine College in September 2001. The headmaster is Madame Skobel and there are currently 233 pupils. In 2026, it is going to amalgamate along with North Coast Integrated College and Dunluce School.

== Aims ==
The College aims to equip young students for FE College, Sixth Form and towards University. Skills taught include partnership and team skills.

== Site ==
In preparation for the amalgamation a £7 million refurbishment of the Girls' School was carried out.

The school is situated on 32 acres (130,000 m^{2}) of land. However, the school is split between two sites, set well back from any main road, and this encourages vandalism which by March 2005 had cost thousands of pounds.

The school was mentioned in the House of Commons in July 2006 when the Northern Ireland Minister Maria Eagle, in answer to a question from Gregory Campbell, stated that the main buildings were then 49 years old.

== Academic standards ==
The Education and Training Inspectorate carried out a follow-up inspection in February 2006 in which they stated that "The school has some strengths in aspects of its educational and pastoral provision that can be built upon. The areas for improvement need to be addressed urgently if the school is to meet effectively, the needs of all the pupils."

However, in a further follow-up inspection in January 2007 they found that the school had made a range of substantial improvements in the past year.

== Sport ==
Student Gordon Patton was a member of the Northern Ireland under-18 football squad in 2006-07.
