= List of integrated schools in Northern Ireland =

Integrated schools are part of integrated education within Northern Ireland, aimed at bringing children together from both sides of the main religious communities through education.

Integrated schools can be Controlled Integrated or Grant Maintained Integrated. Schools can go through a process known as "transformation" to become an integrated school when enough parents seek a parental ballot to transform. Schools must meet a minimum criterion before being granted integrated status.

If schools are unable to transform, parents can create a steering group to push for a grant-maintained integrated school in their area.

Typically, schools that "transform" will be considered Controlled Integrated, while new integrated schools will be Grant Maintained Integrated.

== Secondary schools ==
=== Current ===
School name	Location	County	Type	Opened/Transformed	Notes
Blackwater Integrated College	Downpatrick	Down	Grant Maintained Integrated	2008	
Brownlow Integrated College	Craigavon	Armagh	Controlled Integrated	1991	
Crumlin Integrated College	Crumlin	Antrim	Controlled Integrated	2006	
Drumragh Integrated College	Omagh	Tyrone	Grant Maintained Integrated	1995	
Erne Integrated College	Enniskillen	Fermanagh	Grant Maintained Integrated	1994	
Fort Hill Integrated College	Lisburn	Down	Controlled Integrated	1998	
Hazelwood Integrated College	Belfast	Antrim	Grant Maintained Integrated	1985	
Integrated College Dungannon	Dungannon	Tyrone	Grant Maintained Integrated	1985	
Integrated College Glengormley	Glengormley	Antrim	Controlled Integrated	2022	
Lagan College	Belfast	Down	Grant Maintained Integrated	1981	Operates a Grammar stream
Malone College	Belfast	Antrim	Grant Maintained Integrated	1997	
New-Bridge Integrated College	Loughbrickland	Down	Grant Maintained Integrated	1995	
North Coast Integrated College	Coleraine	Londonderry	Grant Maintained Integrated	1996	
Oakgrove Integrated College	Derry	Londonderry	Grant Maintained Integrated	1992	
Parkhall Integrated College	Antrim	Antrim	Controlled Integrated	2009	
Priory Integrated College	Holywood	Down	Controlled Integrated	1998	
Shimna Integrated College	Newcastle	Down	Grant Maintained Integrated	1995	
Slemish College	Ballymena	Antrim	Grant Maintained Integrated	1996	Operates a Grammar stream
Sperrin Integrated College	Magherafelt	Londonderry	Grant Maintained Integrated	2002	
Strangford College	Carrowdore	Down	Grant Maintained Integrated	1997	Operates a Grammar stream
Ulidia Integrated College	Carrickfergus	Antrim	Grant Maintained Integrated	1997	

=== Closed ===
School name	Location	Opened	Closed	Reason for closure	Ref
Armagh Integrated College	Armagh	2004	2009	Falling roll	
Down Academy	Downpatrick	1998	2008	Merged to create Blackwater Integrated College	
Rowallane Integrated College	Newtownbreda	2006	2008	Merged to create Blackwater Integrated College	

=== Proposed ===
School name	Location	Proposed opening	Notes	Ref.
Mid-Down Integrated College	County Down	2026	Currently Blackwater Integrated College	

== Primary schools ==
School name	Location	Type	Opened/Transformed
Acorn Integrated Primary	Carrickfergus	Grant maintained	1992
All Children's Controlled Integrated Primary	Newcastle	Controlled Integrated	1986
Annsborough Controlled Integrated Primary School	Castlewellan	Controlled Integrated	1997
Ballycastle Integrated Primary School	Ballycastle	Controlled Integrated	
Ballymoney Model Controlled Integrated Primary	Ballymoney	Controlled Integrated	
Bangor Central Controlled Integrated Primary	Bangor	Controlled Integrated	1998
Braidside Integrated Primary and Nursery School	Ballymena	Grant maintained	1989
Bridge Integrated Primary	Banbridge	Grant maintained	1987
Cairnshill Integrated Primary School	Belfast	Controlled Integrated	2024
Carhill Controlled Integrated Primary	Garvagh	Controlled Integrated	1991
Carnlough Controlled Integrated Primary	Carnlough	Controlled Integrated	2001
Cedar Integrated Primary	Crossgar	Grant maintained	1995
Corran Integrated Primary	Larne	Grant maintained	1991
Cliftonville Primary School	Belfast	Controlled Integrated	
Cranmore Integrated Primary School	Belfast	Grant maintained	1993
Crumlin Controlled Integrated Primary School	Crumlin	Controlled Integrated	
Drumlins Integrated Primary School	Ballynahinch	Grant maintained	2004
Enniskillen Integrated Primary	Enniskillen	Grant maintained	1994
Forge Integrated Primary School	Belfast	Controlled Integrated	1985
Fort Hill Integrated Primary School	Lisburn	Controlled Integrated	
Glencraig Controlled Integrated Primary School	Holywood	Controlled Integrated	
Glengormley Controlled Integrated Primary	Glengormley; Newtownabbey	Controlled Integrated	2003
Groarty Controlled Integrated Primary School	Derry	Controlled Integrated	
Harding Memorial Integrated Primary School	Cregagh	Controlled Integrated	2021
Hazelwood Integrated Primary	Belfast	Grant maintained	1985
Kilbroney Integrated Primary	Rostrevor	Controlled Integrated	1998
Killyleagh Integrated Primary School	Killyleagh	Controlled Integrated	2016
Kircubbin Integrated Primary	Kircubbin	Controlled Integrated	1998
Loughries Integrated Primary School	Newtownards	Controlled Integrated	2016
Loughview Integrated Primary	Belfast	Grant maintained	1993
Mallusk Integrated Primary School	Mallusk	Controlled Integrated	
Maine Integrated Primary School	Randalstown	Grant maintained	2003
Mill Strand Integrated Primary School and Nursery School	Portrush	Grant maintained	1987
Millenium Integrated Primary	Saintfield	Grant maintained	2000
Oakgrove Integrated Primary	Derry	Grant maintained	1991
Oakwood Integrated Primary	Belfast	Grant maintained	1996
Omagh Integrated Primary	Omagh	Grant maintained	1990
Phoenix Integrated Primary	Cookstown	Grant maintained	2004
Portadown Integrated Primary	Portadown	Grant maintained	1990
Portaferry Integrated Primary	Portaferry	Controlled Integrated	1995
Rathenraw Integrated Primary School	Antrim	Controlled Integrated	
Roe Valley Integrated Primary	Limavady	Grant maintained	2004
Round Tower Controlled Integrated Primary	Antrim	Controlled Integrated	2003
Rowandale Integrated Primary School	Moira	Grant maintained	2007
Saint and Scholars Integrated Primary	Armagh	Grant maintained	1993
Scoil na Seolta Integrated Primary School	Belfast	Irish Medium	September 2025
Spires Integrated Primary	Magherafelt	Grant maintained	1999
Windmill Integrated Primary	Dungannon	Grant maintained	1988

== Nursery Schools ==
School name	Location	Type	Opened/Transformed
Bangor Integrated Nursery School	Bangor	Controlled Integrated	1949; Transformed 2022
Brefne Integrated Nursery School	Belfast	Controlled Integrated	Transformed 2021

== See also ==
- List of Irish medium nurseries in Northern Ireland
- List of Irish medium primary schools in Northern Ireland
- List of Irish medium secondary schools in Northern Ireland
- List of integrated schools in Northern Ireland
- List of grammar schools in Northern Ireland
- List of primary schools in Northern Ireland
- Gaelscoil
