= Lisnagarvey High School =

Secondary school in Lisburn, Northern ireland

Coordinates: 54.5050°N 6.0593°W

Location
- Warren Gardens; Lisburn, County Antrim, Northern Ireland, BT28 1HN

Information
- Type: Controlled school
- Motto: Success For All
- Denomination: Non-denominational
- Established: 1957
- Local authority: Education Authority
- Principal: Jim Sheerin
- Gender: Co-educational
- Age range: 11-18
- Website: www.lisnagarvey.org.uk

Lisnagarvey High School is a controlled mixed secondary school located in Lisburn, County Antrim, Northern Ireland. It was established in 1957 and is within the South Eastern region of the Education Authority. In 1990 the school officially allowed female students to enrol.

== History ==
The school was originally founded as Lisnagarvey Boys Secondary Intermediate School on 11 September 1957 and had an initial attendance of 750.

In the 2011/12 school year, the pupils predominantly came from a Protestant background (70.3%), followed by those from 'other' religious backgrounds (26.1%), with those from a Catholic background making up a minority (3.6%).

In August 2024 it was reported that 80% of A-Level students achieved grades between A* and C, while 92% had achieved three A-Levels ranging from A* to E.
