= Carrickfergus Learning Community =

Carrickfergus Learning Community (CLC) is a collaboration project between the three post-primary schools in Carrickfergus, Northern Ireland. The project aims to increase the number of subjects available to sixth-form students in the area.

== Schools Involved ==
All three post-primary schools in Carrickfergus are involved;

- Carrickfergus Academy
- Carrickfergus Grammar School
- Ulidia Integrated College

== Subjects Available ==
The schools offer AS and A2, Applied GCEs and BTec qualifications.

=== At Carrickfergus College ===
==== AS/A2 ====
- Religious Education
- Film Studies (Distance learning)

==== Applied GCE ====
- Health & Social Care (Single Award)
- ICT (Single Award)

=== At Carrickfergus Grammar School ===
==== AS/A2 ====
- Accounting
- Biology
- Chemistry
- French language
- Geography
- Government and Politics
- Home Economics
- Music
- Photography
- Physics
- Technology

=== At Downshire School ===
==== AS/A2 ====
- Media Studies

==== Applied GCE ====
- Travel & Tourism (Single Award)
- Physical Education (Single Award)

=== At Ulidia Integrated College ===
==== AS/A2 ====
- Moving Image Arts
- Mathematics

==== BTec ====
- Performing Arts
- Sports Studies
- e.Business

== Logistics ==
Pupils travel by taxi between the three schools involved, and sit exams in the school in which they are taught.

== Criticisms ==
The CLC is often criticized by pupils in attendance of Carrickfergus Grammar School because of the negative effects produced by cross-school timetabling, reducing the flexibility of individual schools to alter their timetable to offer unusual subject combinations that prior to the CLC were possible, for example music and technology. The CLC also gives schools the opportunity to save money by dropping subjects they original taught and offering pupils the subject at other schools for example, Carrickfergus Grammar School no longer offers media-studies but instead offer the subject at Downshire Community School through the CLC, reducing costs but increasing strain on the timetable.
