= St Ciaran's College =

School in County Tyrone, Northern Ireland

Coordinates: 54.6415°N 6.746°W

St Ciarán's College Coláiste Naomh Ciarán
- 15 Tullybryan Road, Ballygawley, Dungannon, BT70 2LY; Northern Ireland

Information
- Religious affiliation: Roman Catholic
- Established: 1966
- Local authority: Education Authority (Southern)
- Principal: Paul Lavery
- Gender: All
- Enrolment: 800
- Colour
- Website: https://www.stciaransballygawley.org

Saint Ciaran's College (Irish: Coláiste Naomh Ciarán) is a co-educational Roman Catholic secondary school located in Ballygawley, County Tyrone, Northern Ireland. It is within the Education Authority (Southern) area.

The college serves students from areas in both South County Tyrone, Northern Ireland and North County Monaghan, Republic of Ireland. The school enrols around 800 students.

== Catchment area ==
The college attracts students from communities in South County Tyrone; Fivemiltown, Clogher, Augher, Eskra, Aughnacloy, Ballygawley, Cabragh, Caledon, Donaghmore, Beragh, Galbally and in North County Monaghan, Emyvale, carrickroe, Clara, Ballyoisin, Tydavnet and Corracrin

Students have come from the following primary schools in south County Tyrone: St Mary's, Ballygawley, St Malachy's, Glencull, St Brigid's, Altamuskin, St Joseph's, Gallbally, St Brigid's, Augher, St Patrick's, Aughadarragh, St Macartan's convent school, Clogher, Roscavey, Beragh, St Mary's, Fivemiletown, St Patrick's, Eskra, St Mary's, Aughnacloy, St Joseph's, Caledon, St Mary's, Cabragh, St Patrick's, Donaghmore, Blessed Patrick O'Loughern, and Castlecaufield. Students have also come from the following national schools in County Monaghan: Deravoy NS, Emyvale, Edenmore NS, Emyvale, St Patrick's NS, Clara, Knockconan NS, and Ballyoisin.

== Sports ==
In 2019, the college won the Irish News Post-Primary School of the Year SCV award for its efforts to promote Gaelic games.

== Funding ==
In March 2022, it was announced by the Education minister that Saint Ciaran's Ballygawley would benefit from £25.8 Million to transform the facilities at the School. The announcement prompted excitement from across the school community as it had been 30 years since any extensive refurbishment had taken place at the school
