= Hunterhouse College =

Location
- Upper Lisburn Road; Finaghy, Belfast, County Antrim, BT10 0LE; Northern Ireland; 54°33′28″N 5°59′16″W

Information
- Type: Grammar
- Motto: Una Crescamus ("Let Us Grow Together")
- Religious affiliation: Integrated
- Established: 1987
- Local authority: BELB
- Head teacher: Chris Collins
- Staff: 100
- Gender: Female
- Age: 11 to 18
- Enrolment: 800
- Houses: Sherman, Welch, Lewis and Duncan
- Colours: Saxe Blue and Hunting Pink
- Website: https://www.hunterhousecollege.org.uk/

Hunterhouse College is a cross-community all-girls' grammar school based in Finaghy, Belfast, Northern Ireland. It was formed from the amalgamation of two local schools – Ashleigh House School and Princess Gardens School in 1987.

As the headmistresses from both schools had the surname "Hunter" at the time of the merger, and an original headmistress was Anna Hunter, the combined school took the name "Hunterhouse College".

Hunterhouse now has its first ever headmaster. Mr Andrew Gibson has been the Principal since September 2008 and was previously Vice-Principal at Grosvenor Grammar.

In 2012 Hunterhouse celebrated its 25 Anniversary year including a concert at the Ulster Hall, Belfast, which past Hunterians, Princess Gardens and Ashleigh House pupils attended.

From 1966 to 1975, Jean Crawford Cochrane was the headmistress of Ashleigh House.

The popular comedy series Derry Girls is filmed here.

== Principals ==
No.	Name	Tenure
1	Doreen Hunter	1987–1998
2	Maureen Clark	1998–2008
3	Andrew Gibson	2008–2025
3	Chris Collins	2025–present

== Controversies ==
In November 2014, after a parent of a pupil complained, the school apologised for a worksheet which presented the traditional Christian view of homosexuality as sinful according to 1 Corinthians 6:9–11 in the New Testament.
