= Craigavon Senior High School =

Location
- 26-34 Lurgan Road, Portadown; Craigavon, County Armagh; Northern Ireland; 54.4310°N 6.4229°W

Information
- Type: Secondary school
- Religious affiliation: Christian
- Established: 1 September 1995
- Local authority: SELB
- Gender: Co-educational
- Age: 14 to 16
- Website: http://www.cshs.org.uk

Craigavon Senior High School was established as a separate controlled school on 1 September 1995. Its primary function is to provide education at Key Stage 4 for those 14- to 16-year-old pupils who transfer from the junior high schools in Lurgan, Portadown and Tandragee. It is the only school in Northern Ireland that solely caters for pupils at Key Stage 4.

Craigavon Senior High School operates as a single school on two sites sharing its Lurgan and Portadown campuses with the Upper Bann Institute of Further and Higher Education. It has its own board of governors, principal and teaching staff.

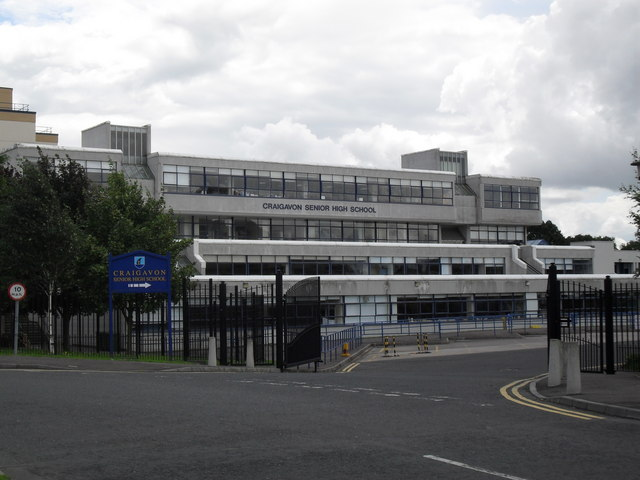
Craigavon Senior High School, 2009

By providing a vocational pathway from junior high school through to further education, it forms an integral part of the Craigavon two-tier system of education. The Craigavon system, which originated in 1969, is intended to allow children to transfer from primary to junior high schools at age 11. Selection at the end of Key Stage 3 (14+) enables pupils to follow an academic route or a vocational route based on a combination of Junior High School work and career preferences.

In 2019 it was reported that the school's Lurgan site would close, with all pupils accommodated at the Portadown campus from the start of the 2020 academic year.
