= Drumglass High School =

Coordinates: 54.511°N 6.768°W

Information
- Former names: Dungannon Intermediate School; Dungannon Secondary School
- Gender: Mixed
- Age: 11 to 16
- Enrollment: c.400

Drumglass High School is a secondary school located on the outskirts of Dungannon, County Tyrone, Northern Ireland. It is a state controlled school for girls and boys aged from 11 to 16 and has approximately 400 pupils. It is within the Southern Education and Library Board area.

The school used to be known as Dungannon Secondary School until the early 1990s when, in common with many secondary schools in Northern Ireland it changed its name from 'Secondary' school to 'High' School. The name Dungannon High School was unavailable as this referred to the girls' school that merged with the local Royal School Dungannon. Another previous name was Dungannon Intermediate School.

A modern new school building was completed by September 2000. This was funded under a Private Finance Initiative. Replacing the older building, which was demolished.
