= Dean Maguirc College =

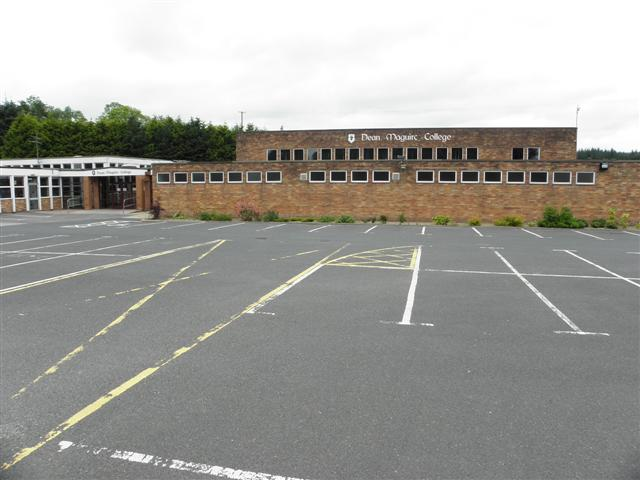

Location
- 26 Termon road, Carrickmore; County Tyrone, BT79 9JR; Northern Ireland
- Coordinates: 54.5938°N 7.0441°W

Information
- Type: Secondary school
- Motto: Proficiens Sapientia et Gratia ('proficient in wisdom and grace')
- Religious affiliation: Roman Catholic
- Local authority: Education Authority (Western)
- Principal: James Warnock
- Staff: 50 approx.
- Gender: Co-educational
- Age: 11 to 19
- Enrollment: 611 (2022)
- Houses: Canice, Davog, Finbarr, Tiernach
- Colours: Green and black
- Website: www.deanmaguirccollege.com

Dean Maguirc College is an all-ability 11-18 co-educational post-primary school in Carrickmore, Northern Ireland.

== History ==
The college is named after the 17th-century priest named Brian MacGurk who was born in the area. He was appointed Dean of the Diocese by St Oliver Plunkett. Following his imprisonment, he died in Armagh Jail on 13 February 1713. He is commemorated both in the name of the college and by the Celtic cross outside St Colmcille's Church.

The number of pupils in the college has steadily increased and by 2022 it had reached over 600. To accommodate the increase in enrollment, the college was awarded over £13million in 2022 for new facilities.

== Academics ==
The school provides instruction in a range of academic subjects. In 2018, 59.6% of its entrants achieved five or more GCSEs at grades A* to C, including the core subjects English and Maths. Also in 2018, 84.1% of its entrants to the A-level exam achieved A*-C grades.

== House system ==
At the start of Year 8 all pupils are divided into one of four Houses (Canice, Davog, Finbarr and Tiernach). These houses are named after ancient Irish saints. The pupils remain attached to one house throughout their time at the college.

== Extra-curricular activities and sport ==
The college has a choir and organises several musicals each year.

The school also participates in a variety of sports including Gaelic football, hurling, handball, basketball and athletics. In Gaelic football, Dean Maguirc College won the Ulster Schools Rafferty Cup (Grade B) in 2018. The college also won the McDevitt Cup in 2022. In 2023, the Dean defeated Abbey VS Donegal in the Loch an Íuir Cup final which earned them promotion to Grade A for the first time. In January 2024, the school's Gaelic football team played their first ever competitive game in Grade A, losing 1-10 to 0-5 against Omagh CBS. Dean Maguirc College had won the Markey Cup the year prior, which granted them promotion to the MacLarnon Cup for the first time. Two years later, in February 2025, the school progressed to the MacLarnon Cup final against Partrician Carrickmacross. The game finished as a draw, Dean Maguirc College 1-10 - 0-13 Partrician Carrickacross, and a replay was scheduled for just two days later in Brewster Park, Enniskillen. Partrician won the replay on a scoreline of 1-10 to 0-12.
