= Lisneal College =

Secondary school in northern ireland

Coordinates: 54.987°N 7.307°W

Lisneal College is a controlled secondary school located in Derry, Northern Ireland. It is within the Western Education and Library Board area.

At £12m, the school is the biggest investment in Derry's controlled sector in 40 years. Work started on the building of the state-of-the-art Lisneal College in June 2005 on a 22-acre (89,000 m^{2}) site on Crescent Link. It was established as a result of the amalgamation of Clondermot High School and Faughan Valley High School. The new building, which caters for nearly 1000 pupils and cost approximately £17.5 million, was opened in September 2007. It was officially opened on 29 May 2009 by Queen Elizabeth II.

== Principal ==
Rita Mullan was appointed Principal on 27 June 2025 as a replacement to Michael Allen.
