= Armagh Integrated College =

Location
- 63 Keady Road; Armagh, County Armagh, BT60 3AS; Northern Ireland
- Coordinates: 54.3310°N 6.6583°W

Information
- Type: Integrated
- Motto: Together We Can Make A Difference
- Established: 2004
- Status: Closed
- Closed: 2009
- Principal: Dominic Clark
- Gender: Co-Educational
- Age: 11 to 18
- Enrolment: 200+
- Colour

Armagh Integrated College was an integrated school in Armagh City, County Armagh, Northern Ireland.

The college began when a group of local parents from both Catholic and Protestant traditions came together to seek integrated second level provision in the Armagh City area. The college was an all-ability, co-educational school and was open to all children.

The school was opened in October 2004 by former Secretary of State for Northern Ireland, Mo Mowlam. It brought secondary level integrated education to the Armagh area, with many new students coming from the local integrated primary school (Saints and Scholars Integrated) and other schools. Due to falling enrollment, the school closed in August 2009. Michael Wardlow, the chief executive of the Northern Ireland Council for Integrated Education, said that the council trusts "that parents will consider keeping their children within the integrated family of schools and would encourage them to view Integrated College Dungannon, which has ably served both communities since 1995 as their future integrated option."
