= Loughbrickland =

Village in County Down, Northern Ireland

Coordinates: 54.316°N 6.304°W

Loughbrickland: Irish: Loch Bricleann
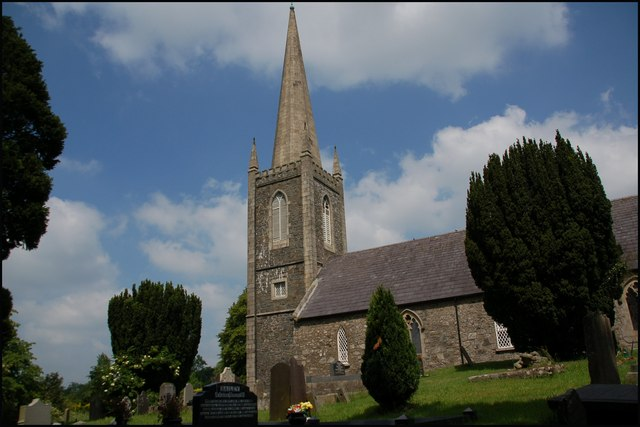
- St Mellon's parish church

- Location within County Down
- Population: 693
- District: Banbridge
- County: County Down
- Country: Northern Ireland
- Sovereign state: United Kingdom
- Post town: Banbridge
- Postcode district: BT32
- Dialling code: 028
- Police: Northern Ireland
- Fire: Northern Ireland
- Ambulance: Northern Ireland
- NI Assembly: Upper Bann

Loughbrickland (/lɒxˈbrɪklæn/ or /lɒxˈbrɪklænd/ lokh-BRIK-lan(d); from Irish Loch Bricleann) is a small village in County Down, Northern Ireland, south of Banbridge on the A1 Belfast–Dublin road. In the 2011 census it had a population of 693. Loughbrickland is within the Banbridge District.

== History ==
Carn Cochy near Loughbrickland as named in the Annals of the Four Masters

Loughbrickland may have been the site where the Three Collas fought the Battle of Achadh Leithdheirg in 331 AD, defeating the forces of Fergus Foga, king of Ulster. The victors killed Fergus and burned Emain Macha, the famous palace of the Ultonian kings, to the ground. The sovereignty of Ulster thus passed from the race of Ir to the race of Heremon. John O'Mahony the Gaelic scholar states that the battle site was commemorated by "a huge Carn of loose stones near Loughbrickland". Samuel Lewis (publisher) in his "Topographical dictionary of Ireland - County Down" states - "At Drummillar is a vast cairn of loose stones, 60 feet high and 226 feet in circumference." This Carn, known as Carn Cochy in the Annals of the Four Masters, stood seventy feet high but appears to have been destroyed when the Scarva to Banbridge railway line was constructed in 1859. What appears to be the Carn can be seen on the image of a 1778 map as a huge pile of stones to the left of the Loughbrickland to Scarva Road, about 2 miles outside Loughbrickland.

Four seventh-century saints are associated with the area: Nasad, Beoan, Ross and Mellan, hermits of Down.

Loughbrickland was a major seat of the Magennises of Iveagh. The Magennis castle was believed to be on the shores of Loughbrickland Lake, although they also inhabited the crannog on the lake as late as the seventeenth century. The Magennises were succeeded in the Loughbrickland area by Sir Marmaduke Whitechurch. Probably the most prominent developer of the district, Whitechurch established villages, churches, and markets that formed the basis of the local infrastructure. Sir Marmaduke built his castle by the lake, which was subsequently dismantled by Cromwell's army. The castle remained in ruins until 1812, when they were removed and a dwelling-house was erected on its site. Its exact location has never been accurately identified; possible sites range from the site of the Magennis castle to where the old Aghaderg School now stands to where the Church of Ireland built their rectory in 1801.

In 1690, William III camped near Loughbrickland with his army from 14 to 25 June, on his march to the Boyne. Tradition has it that William stayed overnight at Bovennet house, and mounted his horse from a stone on the corner of the Poyntzpass Road.

== Demography ==
Loughbrickland is classified as a small village or hamlet by the Northern Ireland Statistics and Research Agency. On Census day (27 March 2011) there were 693 people living in Loughbrickland. Of these:

- 99.86% were from the white (including Irish Traveller) ethnic group;
- 49.49% belong to or were brought up Catholic and 45.31% belong to or were brought up'Protestant and Other Christian (including Christian related); and
- 51.52% indicated that they had a British national identity, 25.40% had an Irish national identity and 29.29% had a Northern Irish national identity.
- 10.57% had some knowledge of Irish;
- 4.98% had some knowledge of Ulster-Scots; and
- 2.11% did not have English as their first language.

== Education ==
- Loughbrickland Primary School (closed September 2006)
- New-Bridge Integrated College
- St. Francis' Primary School

== Places of interest ==
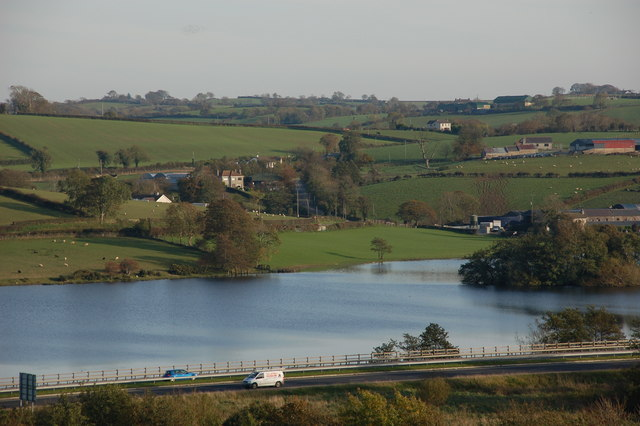
Loughbrickland Lake and the A1 road (Northern Ireland)

Loughbrickland lake is a site of significance to the members of the Church of Jesus Christ of Latter-day Saints in Ireland as the site of the first baptism by immersion in Ireland. On 31 July 1840 Thomas Tate was baptised there by Elder John Taylor, who later became a President of the Church. On 23 October 1985 the site also hosted Elder Neal. A Maxwell of the Church's Quorum of the Twelve Apostles, who dedicated the land of Ireland for the preaching of the Gospel.

== Notable people ==
- Dermott Lennon, the 2002 Show Jumping World Champion, is a native of the village.
- Enoch Powell, a Conservative Member of Parliament for Wolverhampton South West, lived at 14 Main Street.
- Helen Mabel Trevor, landscape and genre painter, was born in Loughbrickland.
