= Emma-Rosa Dias =

Irish television presenter

Emma-Rosa Dias is an IFTA-nominated producer/director from Belfast, Northern Ireland. She presented BBC's Dinner Next Door and was a cast member of Channel 4's first British reality TV show Shipwrecked (TV series) in 2000.

In 2013 Dias founded her own production company, Afro-Mic Productions, which produces commercials, popular factual programmes, documentaries, commercials and drama.

== Early life ==
Dias was born in Belfast. Her mother is of Northern Irish descent and her father is Angolan.

Dias's mother managed a local record shop called Blinkers in the Student's Union of Queen's University Belfast between 1978 and 1986. Dias was immersed in a musical environment, and encountered various subcultures from mods and punks, to new romantics, that would frequent Blinkers. Dias' musical background also extended to her uncle, who was a sound engineer for many bands that played in Northern Ireland, including Pink Floyd, The Clash and Van Morrison.

While attending Botanic Primary School in Belfast, Dias became interested in performing arts and was encouraged to develop her talent by joining a Belfast theatre group. Dias later went on to win the Lyric Theatre's youth drama award two years running. Dias also attained an Honors in Grade 1-4 ballet from the Royal Academy of Dancing.

== Early career ==
Dias moved to Cologne, Germany in 1990 with her mother, residing there until 1998. During this time, Dias became fluent in German, and her media career began in the German music industry in 1992. Starting in the House and Techno music scene when the dance/rave culture was thriving, Dias managed the European bookings for DJ's such as Carl Cox, Laurent Garnier and Richie Hawtin; she also secured European bookings for several homegrown DJ friends such as David Holmes (musician). This experience led to a P.R. role, working for Planet House Records before it was purchased by Warner Brothers Music. She also co-managed the German tour for American alternative hip hop band Arrested Development.

Dias's first TV media venture came when she was recruited to work for Germany's landmark children's TV series Die Sendung mit der Maus, for WDR Television, where she managed guest bands who were performing on the show.

== Shipwrecked and television career ==
Dias next move was starring as a cast member in the second season of Channel 4's long running British reality television show Shipwrecked, produced by RDF Media (Zodiak Media) in 2000.

Dias presented BBC factual entertainment series Dinner Next Door, produced by BAFTA award-winning Alison Miller.

While working in Sydney, Australia, Dias met Hugh Jackman who would sponsor her to take a three-month intensive television production course at Actors Centre Australia in Sydney.

Dias then worked as a television presenter for BBC and UTV, and also began a production career behind the camera at Street Monkey TV, Belfast. Her behind-the-scenes work lead to roles as an In-House TV producer and Assistant Creative Director, producing commercials for many companies including Subway, Coca-Cola, Heineken, Stena Line and Northern Ireland Tourist Board.

Dias fronted the 'Backin' Belfast' campaign, which won the Tourism Think Tank Awards in Berlin, 2013, and Digital Communications Award, beating competition from over 600 contenders.

== Afro-Mic Productions ==
Dias founded her own company, Afro-Mic Productions, in September 2013.

Its first project was Belfast Happy, a unique version of the Pharrell Williams' music video Happy, which was shot featuring members of the public in Belfast dancing in the street. The video garnered worldwide attention, achieving 100,000 views in the first 2 days on YouTube and was endorsed by Pharrell's production company i Am Other, as well as The Oprah Winfrey Show.

Using her passion for music and subcultures, Dias produced a trilogy of documentaries on Mod subculture, including Faces In The Crowd, For The Love of Mod: London, and For The Love Of Mod: Tokyo. The series has been viewed and downloaded in over 100 countries and has gained international acclaim, with reviews praising the authentic portrayals of the Mod scene. Other productions include, The Devil, narrated by Paul Weller, and Big Toe Needs A Hand for Channel 4.

Afro-Mic's first short drama, Cry Rosa, was produced in association with RTÉ Storylands and Northern Ireland Screen. Based on a true story, centred around Dias' own experiences, Cry Rosa, was nominated for Best Short Film at the Irish Film & Television Awards, 2018.

Dias has produced A Taste of Home, a cookery show based in Northern Ireland in co-production with Stellify Media.

In 2021, Afro-Mic Productions produced, The Search an observational documentary series for BBC Northern Ireland, following the work of a local volunteer search and rescue service.
