= Council for Catholic Maintained Schools =

Catholic school advocate in Northern Ireland

The Council for Catholic Maintained Schools (CCMS) is the advocate for Catholic Maintained Schools in Northern Ireland. The council represents trustees, schools and governors on issues such as raising and maintaining standards, the school estate and teacher employment. As the largest employer of teachers in Northern Ireland with 8,500 teachers, It also plays a central role in supporting teachers whether through its welfare service or, for example, in working parties such as the Independent Inquiry into Teacher Pay and Conditions of Service.

There are 547 Catholic-managed schools in Northern Ireland. According to the latest figures from the Department of Education, the number of pupils registered at school in Northern Ireland is 329,583. The number of pupils attending Catholic-managed schools is 148,225, approximately 45%.
