= Education Authority =

Government agency in Northern Ireland

- Údarás Oideachais (Irish); Lear Owerance (Ulster Scots)
- Formation: April 1, 2015; 11 years ago
- Type: Non-departmental body
- Headquarters: Academy Street, Belfast, BT1 2NQ
- Chief Executive: Richard Pengelly
- Chair: Mervyn Storey
- Website: www.eani.org.uk

Education Act (Northern Ireland) 2014
- Act of the Northern Ireland Assembly
- Northern Ireland Assembly
- Long title: An Act to provide for the establishment and functions of the Education Authority; to confer power on the Department of Education to make grants to sectoral bodies; and for connected purposes.
- Citation: 2014 c. 12 (N.I.)

Dates
- Royal assent: 11 December 2014
Other legislation
Amended by	Shared Education Act (Northern Ireland) 2016

Status: Amended

Text of statute as originally enacted

Text of the Education Act (Northern Ireland) 2014 as in force today (including any amendments) within the United Kingdom, from legislation.gov.uk.

The Education Authority (Irish: Údarás Oideachais) is a non-departmental body sponsored by the Department of Education in Northern Ireland. It was established under the Education Act (Northern Ireland) 2014 (c. 12 (N.I.)) which was passed by the Northern Ireland Assembly. The authority became operational on 1 April 2015.

== Responsibilities ==
The Education Authority is responsible for ensuring that efficient and effective primary and secondary education services are available to meet the needs of children and young people, and support for the provision of efficient and effective youth services. These services were previously delivered by the five education and library boards (ELBs). Each of the former ELBs is now a sub region of the Education Authority:

- Belfast Region
- North Eastern Region
- South Eastern Region
- Southern Region
- Western Region

== Education Authority Board ==
The Education Authority Board consists of 20 members plus the Chair. These include:

- 8 political members who were nominated by political parties according to the D’Hondt mechanism;
- 4 members representative of the interests of the Transferors (the Church of Ireland, the Methodist Church in Ireland, and the Presbyterian Church in Ireland) of controlled schools;
- 4 members representative of the interests of the Trustees of maintained schools;
- 1 member representative of the interests of Integrated schools;
- 1 member representative of the interests of Irish medium schools;
- 1 member representative of the interests of Voluntary Grammar schools; and
- 1 member representative of the interests of Controlled Grammar schools
