= Lagan College =

Location
- 44 Manse Road; Belfast, County Down, BT8 6SA; Northern Ireland; 54.5609°N 5.8863°W

Information
- Other name: Lagan Integrated College Belfast; Lagan College Belfast
- Type: Grant Maintained Integrated
- Motto: Ut Sint Unum (That they may be one)
- Religious affiliation: Integrated
- Established: 1981; 45 years ago
- Status: Open
- Local authority: Education Authority
- Principal: Mrs Amanda McNamee MBE
- Staff: 184
- Gender: Co-educational
- Age: 11 to 18
- Enrolment: 1480 (2024/25)
- Capacity: 1400
- Colours: (Sixth Form)
- Website: www.lagancollege.com

Lagan College is a grant maintained integrated secondary school in Belfast, Northern Ireland. It holds a total of around 1480 students (as of 2025). It was formed in 1981 as the first integrated school in Northern Ireland and contains students of mainly Roman Catholic and Protestant faiths, however students from other faiths also attend the school.

Although considered a secondary school, Lagan College operates a grammar entry using SEAG grades for 35% of its admissions.

The school is situated on National Trust land, overlooking Belfast. It is named after the River Lagan, which flows through the city. It is one of Northern Ireland's most oversubscribed secondary schools.

As of 2025, students at Lagan College were 32% Protestant, 36% Roman Catholic and 32% other.

== History ==
Lagan College was founded as a response to the conflict in the community and to the religiously divided school system in Northern Ireland. Most Catholic children attended Catholic-maintained schools, while Protestant school children mainly attended state (controlled) schools.

=== Origins ===
In the early 1970s a group of parents called ‘All Children Together’ wished to explore the idea of sharing their children’s education with other families of differing religious affiliations and cultural traditions. They sought to establish an “integrated school”. They published a paper in 1976 suggesting how it could be done, it was opposed by the churches.

The 1978, Dunleath Act (Education NI) allowed existing schools to transform to integrated status.

In 1981, Lagan College was the first integrated school to open. The school started in the Scout's Ardnavally Activity Centre with 28 pupils on roll. It moved into a redundant primary school at Castlereagh, and then into the Ulster Folk and Transport Museum owned Manor House at Cultra. It became a grant maintained school in 1984. A permanent site on National Trust land was found at Lisnabreeny and was housed in temporary facilities until September 1991.

=== Legislation ===
The political mood was changing. In 1986 a further act, made it easier to open integrated schools and on the back of this, NICIE was established in 1987 to assist. Then, in 1989, came The Education Reform (NI) Order 1989 which provided the statutory framework for the development of integrated schools. Article 64 stipulates that "it shall be the duty of the Department to encourage and facilitate the development of integrated education." Part VI defines two types of integrated school: grant maintained and controlled integrated schools. Department of Education (DE) began to grant-aid schools with revenue funding. In 1991, the college was granted Grant-Maintained Integrated School and is fully funded by the Department.

=== Permanent buildings ===
Approval for the completion of the permanent buildings was given in 2002 under the Department's private finance initiative at a cost of £11.1 million. New buildings were opened in 2014.

With the current educational climate in Northern Ireland, Lagan College stands among the top post-primary education secondary schools. While its focus has been on integration in terms of religious background, the school also integrates children in an 'all-ability' context accommodating children with a variety of academic backgrounds. With that in focus, Lagan College remains one of Northern Ireland's most oversubscribed schools. In 2017, the intake was 200 per year, with 100 in year 13, when it was raised to 200.

== Notable alumni ==
- Clare Bailey, politician
- David Honeyford, politician
- Adam McGibbon, environmentalist
- Matt McGovern, sailor
- Brian Milligan, actor

== See also ==
- List of integrated schools in Northern Ireland
- List of secondary schools in Northern Ireland
- List of grammar schools in Northern Ireland
- Education in Northern Ireland

== Sources ==
- Lloyd, John (20 April 2007). "A difficult subject". FT.com. Archived from the original on 11 December 2022.
