= Education in Northern Ireland =

Coordinates: 54.640°N 5.676°W

Department of Education
- Minister of Education: Paul Givan MLA

National education budget (2021–2022)
- Budget: £2.3 billion

General details
- Primary languages: English, Irish
- System type: Regional
- Compulsory education: 1831

Literacy (2003)
- Total: 99%
- Male: 99%
- Female: 99%

The education system in Northern Ireland differs from elsewhere in the United Kingdom (although it is relatively similar to Wales), but is similar to the Republic of Ireland in sharing in the development of the national school system and serving a similar society with a relatively rural population. A child's age on 1 July determines the point of entry into the relevant stage of education in the region, whereas the relevant date in the Republic of Ireland is the school starting date, and the relevant date in England and Wales is 1 September.

== Overview ==
As with the island of Ireland as a whole, Northern Ireland has one of the youngest populations in Europe and, among the four UK nations, it has the highest proportion of children aged under 16 years (21% in mid-2019).

In the 2021–2022 academic year, the region's school education system comprised 1,124 schools (of all types) and around 346,000 pupils, including:

- 796 primary schools with 172,000 pupils;
- 192 post-primary schools with 152,000 pupils;
- 126 non-grammar post-primary schools with 86,000 pupils;
- 66 grammar schools with 65,000 pupils;
- 94 nursery schools with 5,800 pupils;
- 39 special schools with 6,600 pupils (specifically for children with special educational needs); and
- 14 independent schools with 700 children.

Enrolments in further and higher education were as follows (in 2019–2020) before disruption to enrolments and classes caused by the COVID-19 pandemic:

- six regional further education colleges with 132,000 students;
- two universities – Queen's University Belfast and Ulster University – with 53,000 students;
- two teacher training colleges – Stranmillis University College and St Mary's University College, Belfast – with 2,200 students;
- the College of Agriculture, Food and Rural Enterprise with 1,700 students on three campuses; and
- the Open University with 4,200 students.

Statistics on education in Northern Ireland are published by the Department of Education and the Department for the Economy.

== History ==
For the history prior to the partition of Ireland in the 1920s, see History of education in Ireland.

== Administration ==
Education is devolved to the Northern Ireland Assembly and the government departments which are mainly responsible for education policy are assigned responsibilities according to the different levels of the education system. The Department of Education is responsible for pre-school, primary, post-primary and special education, youth work policy, the promotion of good community relations within and between schools, and teacher education and salaries. Further and higher education sits within the remit of the Department for the Economy and the Department of Agriculture, Environment and Rural Affairs as young people and adults at that stage are either employed or being prepared for entering employment.

The Education Authority (EA) is responsible for ensuring that nursery, primary and post-primary education services are available to meet the needs of children and young people and for providing support for youth services. The authority was established in 2015 and its services, in relation to education, were previously delivered by the five education and library boards (ELBs) from the 1970s onwards and by county councils before that time. Each of the former ELBs is now a sub-region of the Education Authority:

	Sub region of the Education Authority	Area covered
1.	Belfast ^{(formerly BELB)}	
2.	North Eastern ^{(formerly NEELB)}	Antrim, Ballymena, Ballymoney, Carrickfergus, Coleraine, Larne, Magherafelt, Moyle, Newtownabbey
3.	South Eastern ^{(formerly SEELB)}	Ards, Castlereagh, Down, Lisburn and North Down
4.	Southern ^{(formerly SELB)}	Armagh, Banbridge, Cookstown, Craigavon, Dungannon and South Tyrone, Newry and Mourne
5.	Western ^{(formerly WELB)}	Derry, Fermanagh, Limavady, Omagh, Strabane

== Curriculum ==
The majority of examinations sat, and education plans followed, in Northern Irish schools are set by the Council for the Curriculum, Examinations & Assessment. All schools in Northern Ireland follow the Northern Ireland Curriculum which is based on the National Curriculum used in England and Wales. At age 11, on entering secondary education, all pupils study a broad base of subjects from the nine 'Areas of Learning': Language and Literacy, Mathematics and Numeracy, Modern Languages, The Arts, Environment and Society, Science and Technology, Learning for Life and Work, Physical Education, and Religious Education.

Areas of Learning
Area of Learning	Compulsory subjects strands
Language and Literacy	English, Irish, (Note: Only in Irish-medium schools) Media Education
Mathematics and Numeracy	Mathematics, Financial Capability
Modern Languages	An official language of the EU (Note: Excluding English, and Irish in Irish-medium schools) (Note: Schools need only offer one language, but many schools offer students the chance to take two or three. French and German are common in most schools, while Irish is often found in Catholic schools. Spanish and Italian are sometimes offered too. CCEA offers GCSEs in French, German, Irish and Spanish, but GCSEs in Italian, Modern Greek, Polish and Portuguese are offered by other examination boards.)
The Arts	Art and Design, Drama, Music
Environment and Society	History, Geography
Science and Technology	Science, Technology and Design
Learning for Life and Work	Employability, Home Economics, Local and Global Citizenship, Personal Development
Physical Education	Physical Education
Religious Education	Religious Education
Non-compulsory subjects offered in some schools	ICT; A second official language of the European Union; Arabic, Latin, Mandarin Chinese or another non-EU language

At age 14, pupils select which subjects to continue to study for General Certificate of Secondary Education (GCSE) examinations. Currently, it is compulsory to study English Language and Mathematics, although subjects such as English Literature, French, Learning for Life and Work, Religious Studies and Science (single-, double- or triple-award) may also be compulsory in certain schools. In addition, pupils usually choose to continue with other subjects and many study for eight or nine GCSEs, and possibly up to ten or eleven. GCSEs mark the end of compulsory education in Northern Ireland.

At age 16, some pupils stay at school and choose to study A-Level – AS and A2 – level subjects or more vocational qualifications such as Applied Advanced Levels; many also take up vocational courses at further education colleges on leaving school. Those choosing AS and A2 levels normally pick three or four subjects and success in these can determine acceptance into higher education courses at university.

== Levels of education ==
Pre-primary education is optional in Northern Ireland with preschool stage for children aged 3 and 4. In some pre-schools, pupils can leave when they turn 4 and enter into an optional Reception class in their local primary school. (This is entirely optional in most schools which provide these classes.)

Primary education covers three stages – Foundation, Key Stage 1, and Key Stage 2.

- Foundation Stage
  - Reception, age 4 (optional; see above note)
  - Primary 1, age 4 to 5 (equivalent to Reception in England and Wales)
  - Primary 2, age 5 to 6
- Key Stage 1
  - Primary 3, age 6 to 7
  - Primary 4, age 7 to 8
- Key Stage 2
  - Primary 5, age 8 to 9
  - Primary 6, age 9 to 10
  - Primary 7, age 10 to 11

Post-primary (or secondary) education covers up to three stages – Key Stage 3, Key Stage 4, and Key Stage 5:

- Key Stage 3
  - Year 8, age 11 to 12 (equivalent to Year 7 in England and Wales)
  - Year 9, age 12 to 13
  - Year 10, age 13 to 14
- Key Stage 4
  - Year 11, age 14 to 15
  - Year 12, age 15 to 16 (including GCSE examinations)
- Key Stage 5
  - Year 13, age 16 to 17 (including AS-level examinations)
  - Year 14, age 17 to 18 (including A-level A2 examinations)

Although the Department of Education uses Year 8 to Year 14 for post-primary education, the traditional First to Fifth Form, Lower Sixth and Upper Sixth are still used, at least informally, by some schools. Young people may continue their education at a post-primary school (often a grammar school) or at a further education college after Key Stage 4. A range of tertiary education qualifications are available through further education colleges, universities and other institutions, including at bachelor's degree, master's degree and doctorate levels.

== Post-primary transfer ==
Most primary school children will transfer to non-grammar post-primary schools. However, issues around post-primary transfer and academic selection receive a high level of media coverage, as many parents regard a place for their child in a grammar school as a form of social mobility. In 2021–2022, 57% of young people in post-primary education (87,000 pupils) attended non-grammar schools and 43% attended grammar schools (65,000 pupils).

The Education Act (Northern Ireland) 1947 introduced a school system which included a government-run eleven-plus post-primary transfer test as an entrance exam for grammar schools; this had previously been introduced in England and Wales in 1944. The test, a form of academic selection, was retained in Northern Ireland whereas England and Wales moved towards a comprehensive school system, which is also in place in Scotland. The differences in political opinion regarding academic selection, with unionists generally in favour and nationalists and the Alliance Party broadly opposed, reflect differences between Conservative and Labour in Great Britain; a Conservative government introduced the eleven-plus in the 1940s and a Labour government introduced comprehensive schooling in the 1970s.

As Minister of Education in the first Northern Ireland Assembly after the Good Friday Agreement, Martin McGuinness commissioned a review of post-primary transfer – the Burns report – which (in 2001) proposed the ending of the eleven-plus (and academic selection in post-primary transfer) and a system of formative assessment through a pupil profile to provide a wider range of educational information to teachers, parents and pupils. In the subsequent public consultation, a majority of respondents favoured the abolition of eleven-plus tests, but not the end of academic selection, and most wanted all schools to use the same criteria for entry with parental preference to be the most important criterion.

The Assembly was suspended in November 2002 and, under direct rule, Education Minister Jane Kennedy commissioned a post-primary transfer working group, chaired by Steve Costello, which reported in 2004 and broadly supported the Burns Report and recommended a broader curriculum through a model known as the entitlement framework. The Assembly was restored in March 2007 and then Education Minister Caitríona Ruane reaffirmed the decision by her predecessors to abolish the eleven-plus; the last government-run test took place in 2008. The majority of grammar schools, however, decided to set their own entrance exams which, at present, are available in two types – AQE and GL Assessment – although a single test is planned from 2023 onwards.

== School sectors by ethos ==
=== Controlled ===
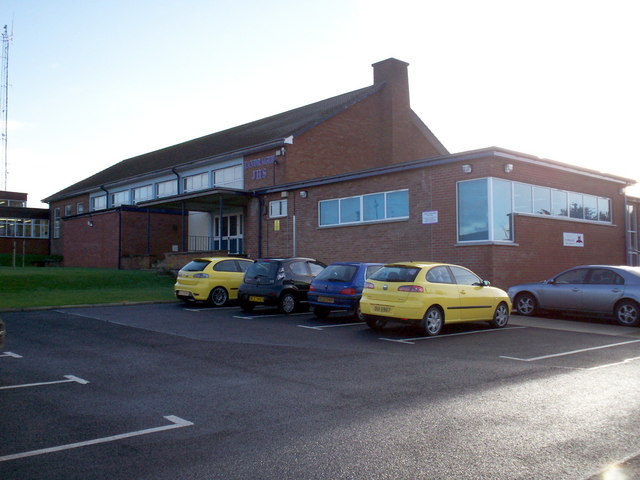
Tandragee Junior High School, a controlled school in County Armagh

Controlled schools are so-called as their governance is controlled by the state (e.g. through the Education Authority as the employer of teachers) although schools are managed by their board of governors, which include representatives of parents, teachers and transferor churches (who transferred their control of schools to the state in the mid-20th century). Controlled schools are open to children of all faiths and none.

Many controlled schools were originally church schools – under the management of the Church of Ireland, Presbyterian Church in Ireland and Methodist Church in Ireland – whose control was transferred in the 1930s and 1940s in return for assurances that a Christian ethos would continue through collective worship (school assemblies), the teaching of non-denominational religious education, and representation of churches on boards of governors. The three churches have a role in education through the Transferor Representatives' Council (TRC) and nominate around 1,500 school governors to the boards of controlled schools. In a more recent development, controlled integrated schools are those which have opted for a formally integrated status and therefore form part of both the controlled and integrated schools sectors.

The Education Act 2014, which created the Education Authority in the following year, was accompanied by a commitment by the Education Minister and the Northern Ireland Executive to establish and fund a support body for schools in the controlled sector. The Controlled Schools' Support Council (CSSC) therefore became operational in 2016; its headquarters are in Stranmillis University College, Belfast. Membership of the council is voluntary and over 90% of controlled schools are members of the CSSC.

In 2021–2022, there were 379 primary schools, 63 nursery schools, 53 secondary (non-grammar) schools and 16 grammar schools in the controlled sector – a total of 511 schools. These included 24 controlled integrated primary schools, five secondary schools and one nursery school with controlled integrated status, and two Irish medium schools. Around 147,000 pupils attended controlled schools (including 8,000 in controlled integrated schools), representing approximately 42% of all pupils in Northern Ireland. In terms of religious breakdown, 59% of pupils in controlled schools were Protestant, 11% were Catholic, and 30% were from other backgrounds.

=== Catholic maintained ===
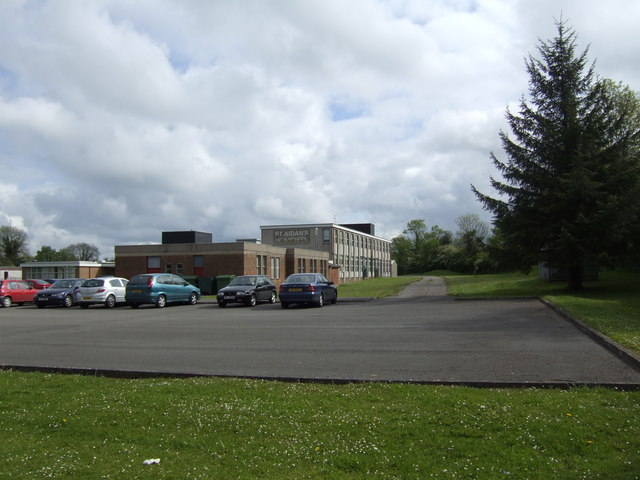
St Aidan's High School, a Catholic maintained school in Derrylin, County Fermanagh

Catholic maintained schools have a Roman Catholic ethos and are maintained by state funding, although the Council for Catholic Maintained Schools (CCMS) – established through the Education Reform (Northern Ireland) Order 1989 – employs teachers in the sector as well as representing its interests. The membership of the CCMS includes representatives of the Department of Education, trustees (Catholic bishops in Northern Ireland), parents (drawn from the local community on a voluntary basis) and teachers. The Catholic Schools' Trustee Service (CTSS) provides teachers, clergy and others interested in Catholic education with resources, guidance and policies to assist them in their work, and highlights the Catholic ethos in education in both the maintained and voluntary grammar sectors.

In 2021–2022, there were 442 Catholic maintained schools – 355 primary schools, 56 post-primary (non-grammar) schools, and 31 nursery schools – with a total of 124,000 pupils, representing around 35% of all pupils; 93% of pupils in the sector were from a Catholic background.

=== Voluntary grammar ===
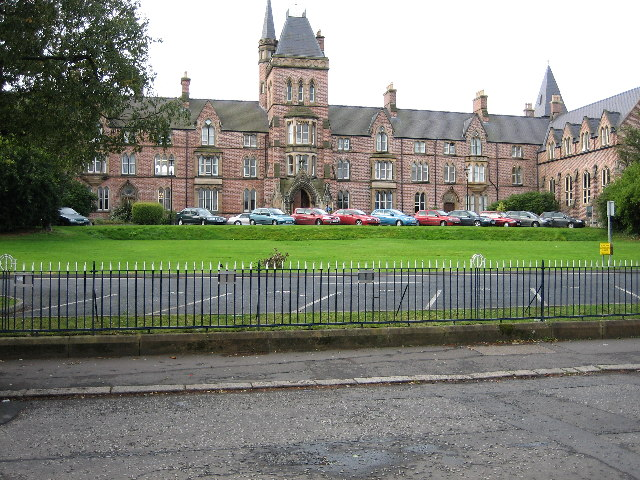
Methodist College Belfast, a voluntary grammar school

Voluntary grammar schools are self-governing schools and generally of long standing, having originally established to provide an academic education at post primary level on a fee-paying basis. These schools are now funded by the department and managed by boards of governors which are constituted in accordance with each school's scheme of management – usually representatives of foundation governors, parents, and teachers and in most cases, representatives of the department or the Education Authority. The board of governors is the employing authority and is responsible for the employment of all staff in its school.

There were 50 voluntary grammar schools in 2021–2022 with around 51,000 pupils. The sector included 29 schools under Catholic management with 30,000 pupils and 21 under other forms of management with 21,000 pupils; 95% of pupils attending Catholic voluntary schools are from a Catholic background and 57% of pupils attending other voluntary schools are from a Protestant background. The Governing Bodies Association represents the interests of voluntary grammar schools.

=== Integrated ===
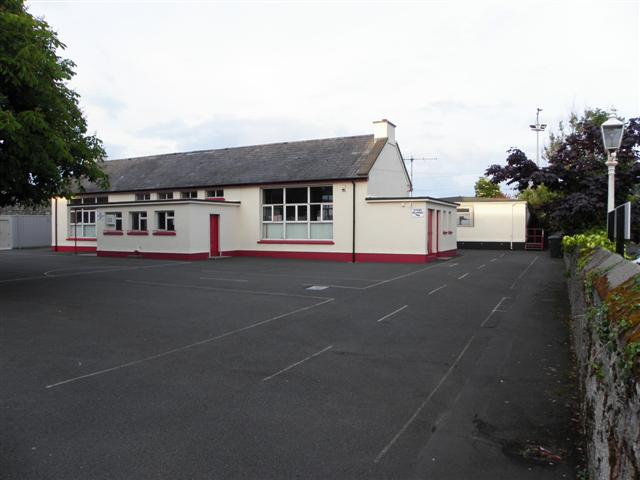
Carnlough Integrated Primary School, County Antrim

Grant-maintained integrated schools are those which have been established by the voluntary efforts of parents (such as the first formally integrated school, Lagan College, which was founded in 1981). Controlled integrated schools are controlled schools which have opted to have integrated status following a transformation process with the approval of parents. While parents, rather than churches, took the initiative in the development of grant-maintained integrated schools, the older controlled integrated schools (for example, those built in the 1930s and 1940s) were founded by Protestant churches before their transfer to the state in the mid-20th century.

The Northern Ireland Council for Integrated Education (NICIE), a voluntary organisation, promotes, develops and supports integrated education, through the medium of English. The Integrated Education Fund (IEF) is a trust fund for the development and growth of integrated education in the region in response to parental demand. The IEF seeks to bridge the financial gap between starting integrated schools and securing full government funding and support. It was established in 1998 with funding from EU Structural Funds, the Department of Education, the Nuffield Foundation, and the Joseph Rowntree Charitable Trust. The IEF financially supports the establishment of new schools, the growth of existing schools, and those schools seeking to become integrated.

In 2021–2022, there were 38 grant-maintained integrated schools (23 primary and 15 post-primary) and 30 controlled integrated schools (24 primary, five post-primary and one nursery); all post-primary schools in the sector are non-grammar, however, three schools (Lagan College, Strangford College and Slemish College) accept a percentage of pupils based on grammar level ability (SEAG scoring). There were around 18,000 pupils in grant-maintained integrated schools and 8,000 pupils in controlled integrated schools, therefore around 26,000 pupils in 68 schools across the sector. The community backgrounds of pupils in grant-maintained integrated schools were 40% Catholic, 32% Protestant and 27% other, whereas the proportions for controlled integrated schools were 41% Protestant, 23% Catholic and 36% other.

=== Irish-medium maintained ===
The Education (Northern Ireland) Order 1998 placed a duty on the Department of Education, similar to that already in existence in relation to integrated education through the 1989 Education Reform Order, "to encourage and facilitate the development of Irish-medium education". Pupils are usually taught most subjects through the medium of Irish, which is the second language of most of the pupils, whilst English is taught through English. This form of education has been described as Immersion education, and is now firmly established as a successful and effective form of bilingual education. It aims to develop a high standard of language competence in the immersion language (Irish) across the curriculum, but must also, and can, ensure a similar level of achievement in the first language (in this case, usually English) as that reached by pupils attending monolingual English medium schools.

Irish-medium schools, or Gaelscoileanna, are able to achieve grant-aided status, under the same procedures as other schools, by applying for maintained status. In addition to free-standing schools, Irish language medium education can be provided through units in existing schools; unit arrangements permit Irish-language-medium education to be supported where a free-standing school would not be viable. A unit may operate as a self-contained provision under the management of a host English-medium school and usually on the same site. In addition to this, there are two independent schools teaching through the medium of Irish. These are Gaelscoil Ghleann Darach in Crumlin and Gaelscoil na Daróige in Derry City.

Comhairle na Gaelscolaíochta (CnaG) is the representative body for Irish-medium education, and was set up in 2000 by the Department of Education to promote, facilitate and encourage Irish-medium education. One of CnaG's central objectives is to seek to extend the availability of Irish-medium education to parents who wish to avail of it for their children, and it is supported in this role by Iontaobhas na Gaelscolaíochta (the trust fund for Irish-medium education.

In 2021–2022, there were 25 primary schools and two post-primary schools (both non-grammar) in the Irish-medium maintained sector, with around 5,000 pupils, and 10 Irish-medium units, educating around 1,500 pupils; pre-school education is also available in the Irish language.

== School buildings ==
Plans for investment in Northern Ireland schools and youth facilities were published in 2005, intended to address a reported problem of "historic under-investment". The "Investment Strategy for Northern Ireland 2005–2015" was published on 14 December 2005. To offer sufficient construction companies an opportunity to support this strategy, the Department of Education established the "Northern Ireland Schools Modernisation Programme ("NISMP"), with companies invited to express interest in works contracts in 2007.

== Further and higher education ==
Northern Ireland provides a wide range of options for further and higher education through its universities, regional colleges (for further education), and other specialist colleges for teacher training and the agri-food sector. The Open University and regional colleges, in particular, enroll large numbers of adult learners. Many young people choose to travel to Great Britain to continue their education although this has, for many years, caused concern about a 'brain drain' effect and the difficulty in retaining skills and knowledge in the region's economy. The relatively low cost of living and higher quality of life in smaller and closer-knit communities, though, is an attraction for many students and graduates from Britain, the rest of Ireland and elsewhere.

In 2019–2020, the last year before disruption to school exams by the Covid-19 pandemic, 48% of school leavers in Northern Ireland entered higher education, 29% entered further education, 10% entered training, 9% entered employment, 3% became unemployed and the destination for a further 2% was unknown.

== See also ==
- Education in the Republic of Ireland
- Education in the United Kingdom
- Controlled Schools' Support Council
- Council for Catholic Maintained Schools
- Integrated education in Northern Ireland
- Lists of schools in Northern Ireland
- List of primary schools in Northern Ireland
- List of secondary schools in Northern Ireland
- List of grammar schools in Northern Ireland
- List of integrated schools in Northern Ireland
- List of further education colleges in Northern Ireland
- List of universities and colleges in Northern Ireland
- Segregation in Northern Ireland
