= Integrated education in Northern Ireland =

Educational movement in Northern Ireland

Integrated education in Northern Ireland refers to the bringing together of children, parents and teachers from both Catholic and Protestant traditions in childhood education: the aim being to provide a balanced education, while allowing the opportunity to understand and respect all cultural and religious backgrounds.

== History ==
In 2017 the Northern Ireland government commissioned a report to detail the development of Integrated Education, so as to decide on structures and processes to support the effective planning, growth and development of a more integrated education system, with a framework of viable and sustainable schools. Since 1974 the All Children Together (ACT) movement had been lobbying against the segregation in schools in Northern Ireland. The Education (Northern Ireland) Act, 1978 (Dunleath Act) contained a provision that allowed existing schools to transform to integrated status, but none succeeded. Consequently, a group of parents founded Lagan College, a new type of non-sectarian school in September 1981.

By 1987, there were seven newly established integrated schools, and Northern Ireland Council for Integrated Education (NICIE) was formed as a charitable organisation to co-ordinate efforts to develop integrated education, and to support parent groups through the process of opening new schools.

The Education Reform (NI) Order 1989 provided a statutory framework for the development of integrated schools. Article 64 of the Order defines integrated education as ‘the education together at school of Protestant and Roman Catholic pupils’. It states that it ‘shall be the duty of the Department to encourage and facilitate the development of integrated education’. Part VI and Schedules 5 and 6 of the Order define the arrangements for the establishment, management and governance of two types of integrated school: grant maintained integrated schools and controlled integrated schools.

It was at this point that Department of Education began to grant-aid schools with revenue funding.

== Legislation ==
=== Integrated Education Act (Northern Ireland) 2022 ===
Integrated Education Act (Northern Ireland) 2022
- Act of the Northern Ireland Assembly
- Northern Ireland Assembly
- Long title: An Act to make provision about integrated education; and for connected purposes.
- Citation: 2022 c. 15 (N.I.)
- Introduced by: Kellie Armstrong MLA
- Territorial extent: Northern Ireland

Dates
- Royal assent: 26 April 2022

Status: Current legislation

Text of statute as originally enacted

Text of the Integrated education in Northern Ireland as in force today (including any amendments) within the United Kingdom, from legislation.gov.uk.

The Northern Ireland Assembly passed the Integrated Education Act (Northern Ireland) 2022 (c. 15 (N.I.)) was passed in March 2022. It ensures a duty on the Department of Education to provide further support to the integrated schools sector. The bill was passed by 49 votes to 38.

The Alliance, Sinn Fein, SDLP, Green Party and People Before Profit all supported the bill, whilst the DUP and UUP did not.

The act requires the Department of Education to "encourage, facilitate and support" integrated education. The Act requires the Education Authority to assess demand for integrated education.

The act was described as being "imprecise".

The act requires the Department to increase the number of integrated school places and set targets for the number of children being educated in them.

The department published the first report under the act in 2024. The report described increasing the numbers of places in oversubscribed integrated schools and also described a "Call for Transformation" scheme to allow existing schools to formally become integrated.

The first Minister for Education to implement the act was Paul Givan of the Democratic Unionist Party. He said that schools had been "let down" after 10 building projects had their funding withdrawn after £150 million was reallocated in HM Treasury's £3.3 billion financial package for the restoration of the power-sharing executive.

== Northern Ireland Council for Integrated Education ==
The Northern Ireland Council for Integrated Education (NICIE), a voluntary organisation, promotes, develops and supports integrated education in Northern Ireland.

NICIE’s Statement of Principles go beyond just the education of Protestant and Catholic children in a single building. NICIE aims to create a shared ethos and environment that welcomes and that celebrates all traditions. Schools should have a mixed staff, board of governors and pupils. It celebrates inclusion and fosters creativity in schools. It fosters "an environment where governors, staff, parents – and, in age-appropriate ways, pupils – can engage with social, political and religious debates explicitly and in a sharing and inclusive way."

The four key elements of NICIE’s Statement of Principles are:

- Equality and diversity
- A child-centred education
- A partnership with parents
- A Christian ethos

== Educational background ==
Education in Northern Ireland is highly religiously segregated, with 95% of pupils attending either a maintained (Catholic) school or a controlled school (mostly Protestant, but open to all faiths and none), both funded by the state by varying amounts. In addition there is pressure to open more Irish medium schools, where in 2007 there was surplus of places in existing schools. The churches in Northern Ireland have not been involved in the development of integrated schools. Integrated schools have been established by the voluntary efforts of parents.

== Current situation ==
The first integrated school, Lagan College, was established in Belfast in 1981, in 1985, three more integrated schools opened in Belfast. As of 2017, there were 65 integrated schools comprising 20 post-primary colleges and 45 primary schools. 27 are Controlled Integrated. Existing controlled schools voted to ‘transform’ and 38 are Grant-Maintained Integrated, new schools, created by the local parents, the last of which, Rowandale Integrated Primary School in Moira, County Down, was established in 2008. In addition, there are 19 integrated nursery schools, most of which are linked to primary schools as at Rowandale.

In March 2022, the Integrated Education Bill was passed.

== Criticisms ==
Integrated schools were sometimes criticised as being "middle-class" or accused of "social engineering". Then Monsignor Denis Faul criticised integrated education, insisting that Catholic parents were required by canon law to send their children to Catholic schools and also claimed the schools were a "dirty political trick" inspired by the British Government. Speaking out against integrated education, the Free Presbyterian Church described it as a "front for ecumenism and the secular lobby".

In July 2021, John O'Dowd said during the second stage debates of the Integrated Education Bill that while integrated schools promote inclusivity "there's only one or very few play Gaelic games. There's none promote the Irish language. I will correct myself: I think that there is one. The identity in it is not neutral - in many of them it is British." He also said "You can pay homage to the Crown but to no-one else". He said that he supported the principle of the bill but urged the integrated sector to "get its head around" how it promotes "all identities". He also said "The reason why we have such a separated education system dating back to the 1920s - and I am no defender of the Catholic hierarchy - is because the Catholic Church took a very strong view of this ... That to keep Irish identity, Irish culture alive in a partitioned state, it would have to have its own education system."

Kellie Armstrong replied that she had never seen that in any integrated school she had visited. She said "In the integrated schools that I go into, I see a culture that is reflective of everyone who attends there and is respectful of all cultures." Regarding promoting the Irish language and Gaelic games she said "I'm somewhat at a loss given the fact that Lagan College and Drumragh Integrated College have both been former winners of the JJ Reilly Cup. Kellie Armstrong says all cultures are respected through integrated education. My own daughter played hurling for her integrated college." She also said "Irish culture is not eroded, neither is British culture. Integrated education isn't about assimilating young people into one culture - it's about celebrating all cultures."

== Shared education initiatives ==
In 2011, Department of Education launched a new Community Relations, Equality and Diversity in Education policy.

The objectives of the policy are to:

- ensure that learners have an understanding of and respect for the rights, equality and diversity of all without discrimination;
- educate children and young people to live and participate in the changing world with respect while taking account of the ongoing intercommunity divisions arising from conflict and increasing diversity within our society;
- equip children and young people with the skills, attitudes and behaviours needed

== See also ==
- List of integrated schools in Northern Ireland
- Education in Northern Ireland
- Segregation in Northern Ireland
- Educate Together
