= Ballinderry =

Ballinderry may refer to:

== Northern Ireland ==
- Ballinderry, Mid Ulster, a parish on the border between Counties Londonderry and Tyrone
  - Ballinderry Shamrocks, Gaelic Athletic Association club
- Ballinderry, Kilcronaghan civil parish, a townland in County Londonderry
- Ballinderry, County Antrim, a civil parish and townland in County Antrim
  - Lower Ballinderry, a small village in County Antrim
  - Upper Ballinderry, a small village in County Antrim
    - Ballinderry railway station, a disused railway station near Upper Ballinderry
- Ballinderry River, near Cookstown, County Tyrone

== Republic of Ireland ==
- Ballinderry, Tuam, County Galway
- Ballinderry, County Roscommon
- Ballinderry, County Tipperary
- Ballinderry, County Westmeath
