= Crumlin =

Crumlin may refer to:

== Northern Ireland ==
- Crumlin, Belfast, a ward of North Belfast
- Crumlin, County Antrim, a town in County Antrim
  - Crumlin railway station, Northern Ireland, County Antrim
  - Crumlin Viaduct (Northern Ireland), County Antrim
  - Crumlin United F.C. (Northern Ireland), a Northern Irish club
- Crumlin Road, Belfast
  - Crumlin Road Gaol, a former prison
  - Crumlin Road Courthouse

== Republic of Ireland ==
- Crumlin, County Westmeath, a townland in the civil parish of Rathaspick
- Crumlin, Dublin, a suburb of Dublin
  - Crumlin GAA, a Gaelic Athletic Association in Dublin
  - Crumlin United F.C.

== Wales, UK ==
- Crumlin, Caerphilly, a town in Caerphilly County Borough
  - Crumlin Viaduct
