= Aldergrove =

Aldergrove may refer to:

== Northern Ireland ==
- Aldergrove, County Antrim, a hamlet close to the site of:
  - Aldergrove Flying Station, former RAF base and current British Army base
  - Aldergrove Airport, historical but still locally used name for Belfast International Airport
  - Aldergrove railway station, former station serving the hamlet

== Elsewhere ==
- Aldergrove, Edmonton, a neighbourhood in Alberta, Canada
- Aldergrove, Langley, a neighbourhood in British Columbia, Canada
