= Crumlin Viaduct (Northern Ireland) =

Railway bridge in Crumlin, Northern Ireland

Coordinates: 54.6232°N 6.2128°W

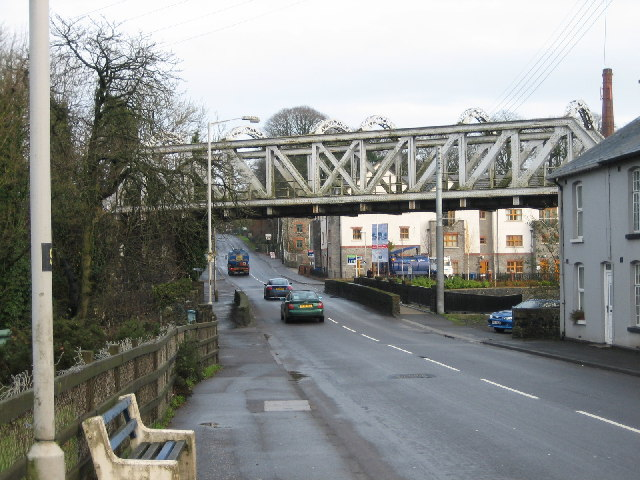
The bridge in 2005

The Crumlin Viaduct is a railway bridge in Crumlin, County Antrim. It has the distinction of being the only place in Ireland where a train, plane, car, and boat can theoretically cross paths, due to its unique status of being a railway bridge straddling a road bridge across a river, with Belfast International Airport two kilometres to the north.

== History ==
The railway line through Crumlin opened in 1871, crossing the Crumlin River by means of a simple lattice girder bridge. This was replaced in 1915 with the current structure, a Pratt truss. The original was reused at Adelaide railway station in Belfast. The current viaduct was designed and built by James Findlay & Co. of Motherwell, Scotland.

Passenger traffic ceased in 1960.

The bridge was reinforced in the early 1970s to prepare for the reintroduction of passenger traffic, in 1974. It then carried trains between Derry, Antrim, Lisburn and Belfast until 2003, when the passenger service ceased once again.

== Today ==
The viaduct, along with the rest of the Lisburn - Antrim line, has lain mothballed since 2003, though both are maintained to an operational level and used for engineering trains, driver training, and diversionary passenger services when the line between Belfast and Antrim via Whiteabbey is closed. The possibility of the line, and thus the viaduct, being brought back into regular use for a circular Belfast - Antrim - Lisburn passenger service has been considered for some years.

== Popular culture ==
It appeared in the BBC series 'Walk The Line' in 2015.
