= Aldergrove railway station =

Railway station in County Antrim, Northern Ireland

Aldergrove

General information
- Location: Aldergrove; County Antrim; Northern Ireland
- Coordinates: 54.6455°N 6.2413°W
- Line: Lisburn–Antrim railway line
- Distance: 13 miles 16 chains from Knockmore Junction

Construction
- Structure type: At-grade

Other information
- Status: Disused

History
- Original company: Dublin and Antrim Junction Railway
- Pre-grouping: Great Northern Railway (Ireland)

Key dates
- 13 November 1871: Opened
- 1879: Absorbed into the Great Northern Railway (Ireland)
- 1 September 1953: Transferred to the Great Northern Railway Board
- 1 October 1958: Transferred to the Ulster Transport Authority
- September 1960: Closed to passengers

Historical railways
Preceding station	Historical railways	Following station
Millars Bridge Halt; Line open, station closed	Dublin and Antrim Junction Railway; Lisburn–Antrim (1871–1879)	Crumlin; Line open, station closed
Millars Bridge Halt; Line open, station closed	Great Northern Railway (Ireland); Lisburn–Antrim (1879–1953)	Crumlin; Line open, station closed
Millars Bridge Halt; Line open, station closed	Great Northern Railway Board; Lisburn–Antrim (1953–1958)	Crumlin; Line open, station closed
Millars Bridge Halt; Line open, station closed	Ulster Transport Authority; Lisburn–Antrim (1958–1960)	Crumlin; Line open, station closed
Route map
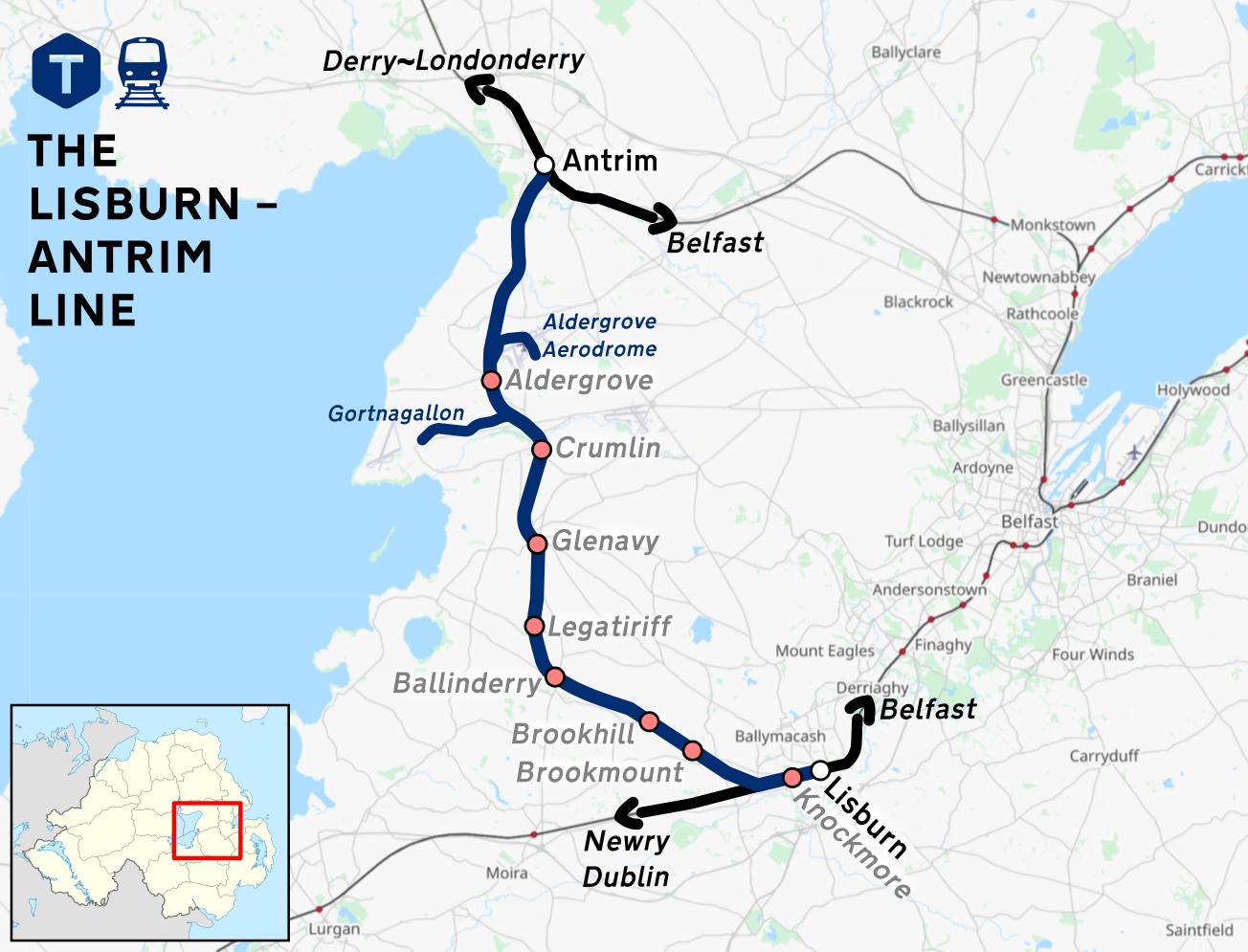
(Click to expand)
Location
- Location within Northern Ireland Location within island of Ireland

Aldergrove railway station is a former railway station which served the hamlet/townland of Aldergrove in County Antrim, Northern Ireland. It was south of Antrim, near RAF Aldergrove and Belfast International Airport.

== History ==
The station was opened in 1871 by the Dublin and Antrim Junction Railway, which in 1879 became part of the Great Northern Railway (Ireland). In 1958 it passed to the Ulster Transport Authority, which withdrew passenger services from the line and closed the station in 1960.

== Proposals ==
As of 2014, it was proposed that Aldergrove railway station could be reopened to serve Belfast International Airport. As the Lisburn–Antrim railway line was closed in 2003, plans for a station to serve the airport (a few hundred yards away) are aspirational. The Department for Regional Development Railway Investment Prioritisation Strategy stated in 2014 that a "re-opened Antrim to Knockmore/Lisburn line could also present an opportunity to establish a rail link to Belfast International Airport (BIA), although such investment is less likely to be economically viable until airport passengers grow to at least 10 million".

The reopening of the Lisburn–Antrim railway line, including a proposed connection to Belfast International Airport, was recommended in the All-Island Strategic Rail Review published in July 2024. In 2025, Translink published a feasibility study examining the reopening of the railway, including the construction of a new station serving the airport. The study considered several options, including a railway spur towards the airport terminal or an interchange station on the existing railway with onward transport connections. The study did not confirm whether the proposed airport station would occupy the site of the former Aldergrove railway station. The proposals remain subject to further planning, development and funding.
