= Magherabeg railway station =

Railway station in County Down, Northern Ireland

Magherabeg
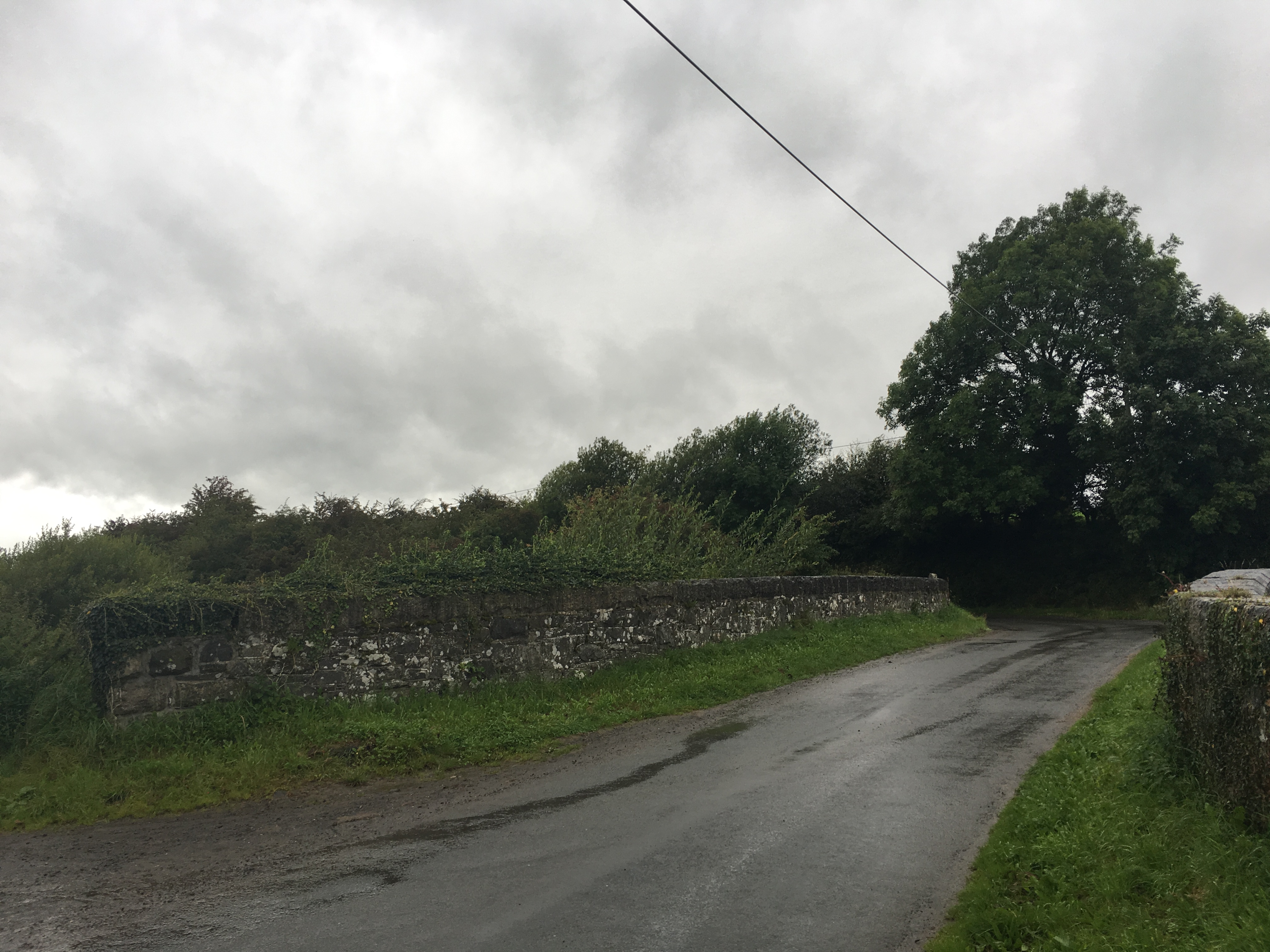
- The bridge which carried the Magherabeg Road across the station platform.

General information
- Location: Magherabeg, County Down; Northern Ireland

Other information
- Status: Disused

History
- Original company: Great Northern Railway (Ireland)
- Pre-grouping: Great Northern Railway (Ireland)
- Post-grouping: Great Northern Railway (Ireland)

Key dates
- 1 October 1929: Station opens
- 30 April 1956: Station closes

Magherabeg railway station was on the Banbridge, Lisburn and Belfast Railway which ran from Knockmore Junction to Banbridge in Northern Ireland.

== History ==
The station was opened by the Great Northern Railway (Ireland) on 1 October 1929 and closed on 30 April 1956.

Preceding station	Historical railways	Following station
Ballygowan Halt	Banbridge, Lisburn and Belfast Railway; Knockmore Junction-Banbridge	Dromore

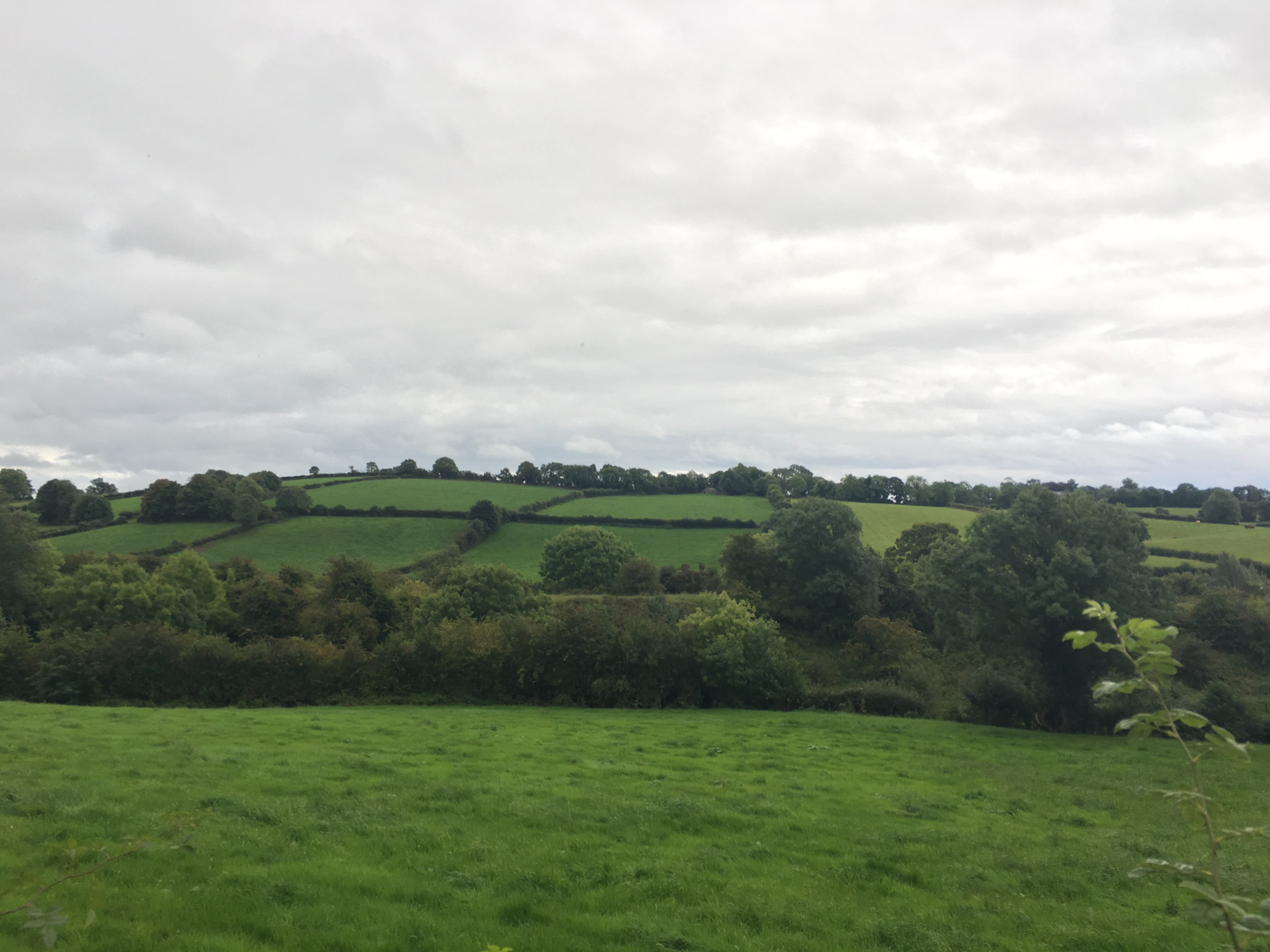
Railway embankment just to the west of Magherabeg station.
