= Dromore Viaduct =

Railway viaduct in Northern Ireland

Coordinates: 54°24′50″N 6°09′38″W

The Dromore Viaduct is an abandoned railway viaduct in Dromore, County Down, Northern Ireland.

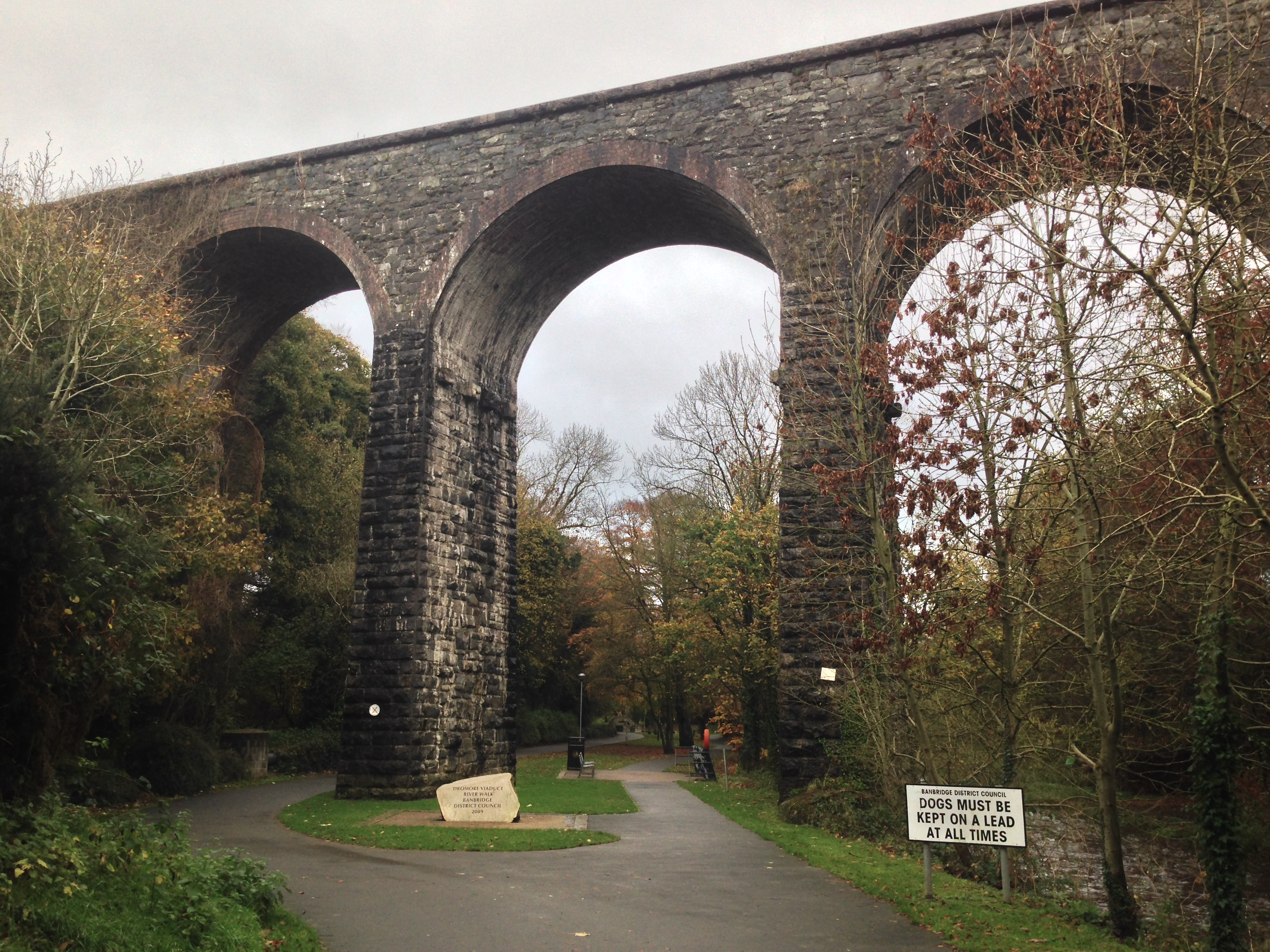
The viaduct as seen in November 2015

== Design ==
The viaduct crosses the River Lagan. It is roughly 101m long and 6m wide, having been built to carry only a single track. The viaduct consists of seven arches, 10m apart, with the piers being 1.5m wide. The piers and abutments are made of ashlar blackstone, whilst the parapets, which stand a metre above arch level, are coped with chamfered sandstone. The viaduct stands at 23 metres tall.

It was designed by Thomas Jackson of Messrs Greene & King, who built the line from Knockmore to Banbridge. Jackson was also responsible for designing Hillsborough and Dromore railway stations.

== History ==
Construction began in 1860 and was completed the following year, opening to railway traffic in 1863 with the first train on 13 July that year. Originally owned by the Banbridge, Lisburn and Belfast Junction Railway (Whose trains were run by the Ulster Railway), it became part of the Great Northern Railway in 1876. The line, and thus the viaduct, was closed on 30 April 1956 and the tracks lifted shortly after.

In 2009, the PSNI was called to the viaduct after a group of teenagers broke onto and bungee jumped from it.

== Today ==
The viaduct is a listed building and has been since 1977. It is the property of Armagh, Banbridge and Craigavon Borough Council. Dromore Town Park passes underneath two of the arches, though the ends have both been sealed off from public access. Floodlights have been installed under the arches and it is common to see it lit up blue overnight.
