= Ballygowan Halt railway station =

Railway station in County Down, Northern Ireland

Coordinates: 54.4541°N 6.1211°W

Ballygowan Halt
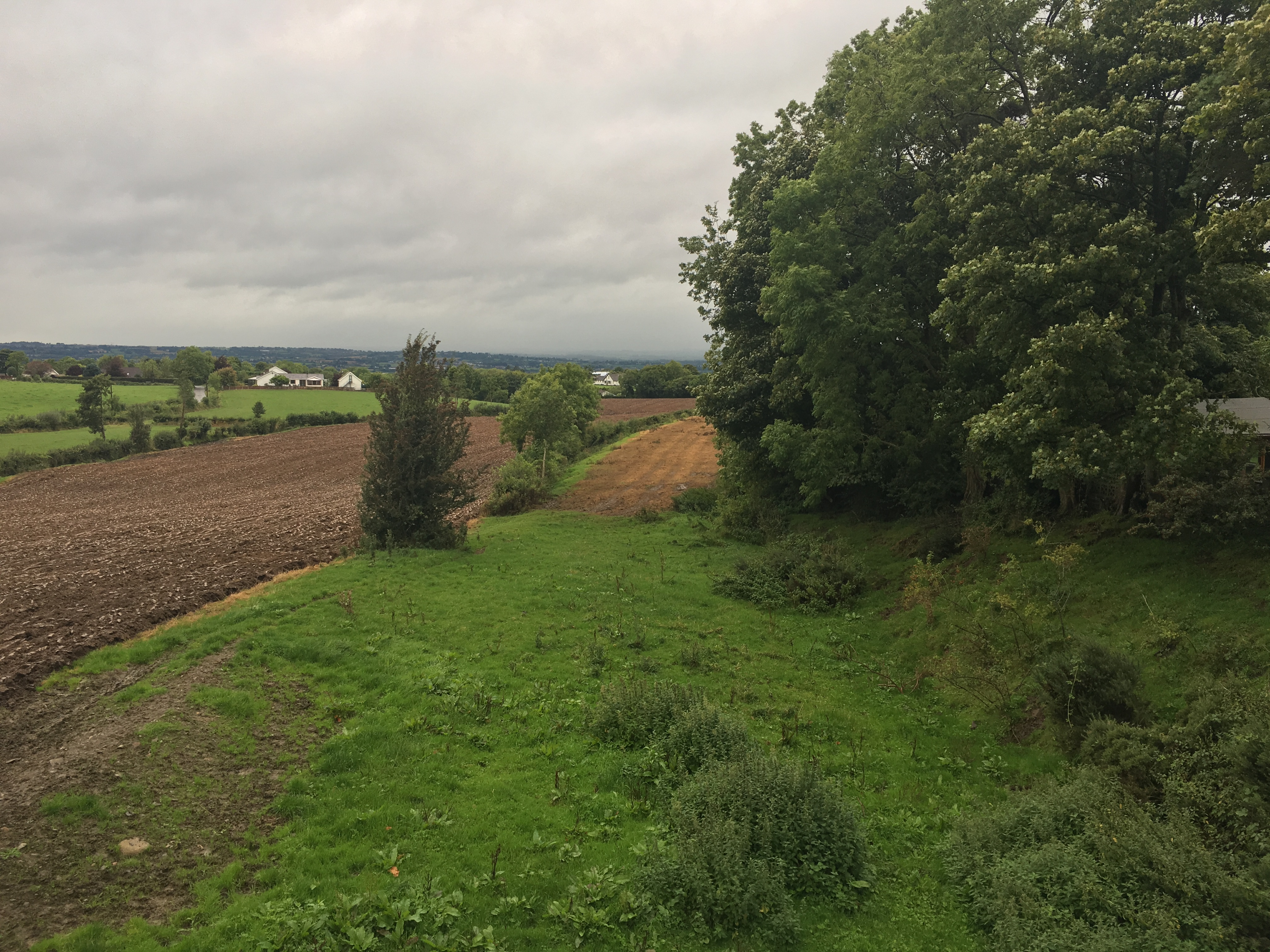
- The site of the demolished Ballygowan Halt.

General information
- Location: County Down; Northern Ireland

Other information
- Status: Disused

History
- Original company: Great Northern Railway (Ireland)
- Pre-grouping: Great Northern Railway (Ireland)
- Post-grouping: Great Northern Railway (Ireland)

Key dates
- 10 September 1929: Station opens
- 30 April 1956: Station closes

Ballygowan Halt railway station was on the Banbridge, Lisburn and Belfast Railway, which ran from Knockmore Junction to Banbridge in Northern Ireland. The station served County Down.

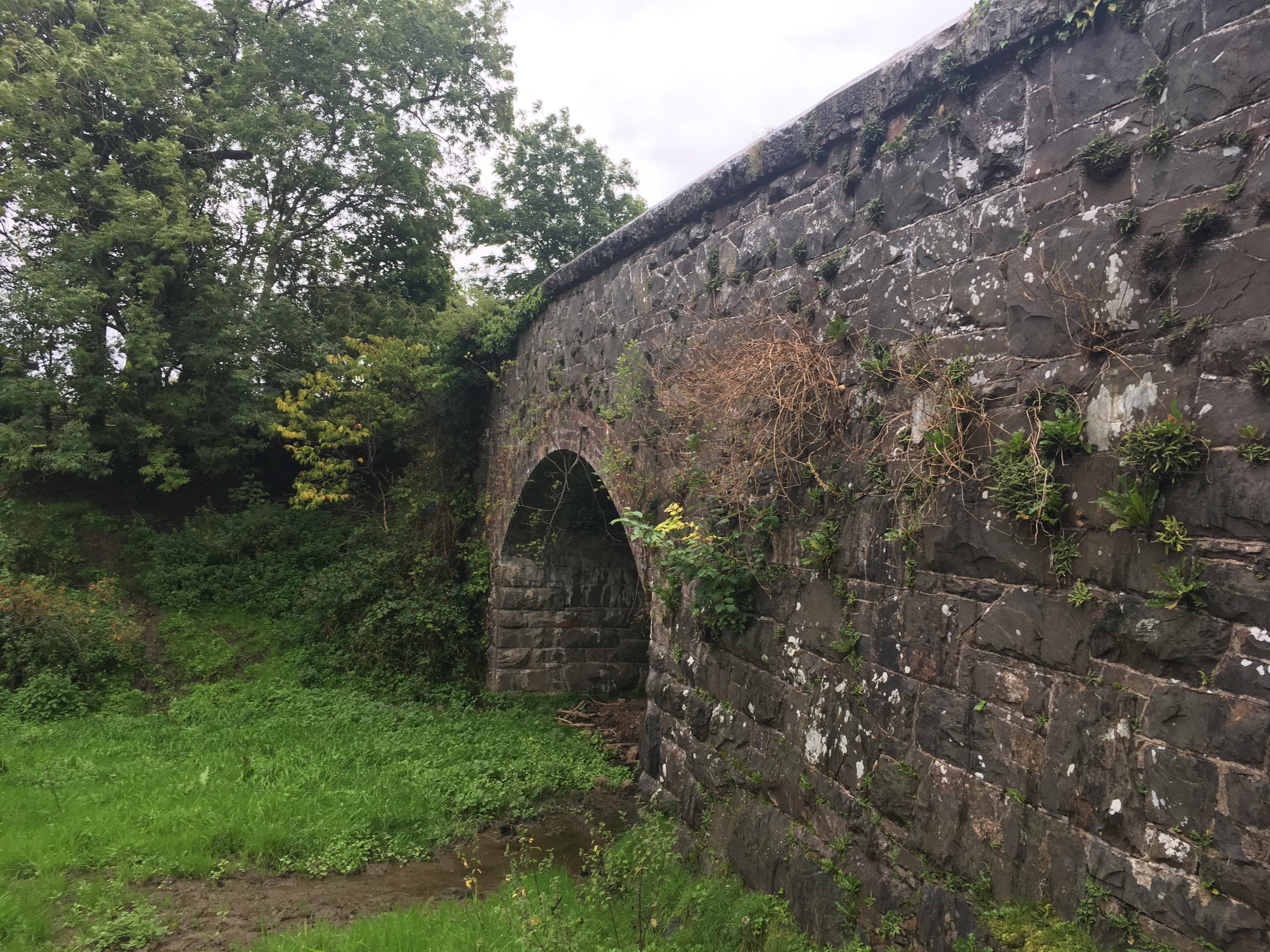
The Glen Road bridge, which was at the end of the platform, still stands today.

== History ==
The station was opened by the Great Northern Railway (Ireland) on 10 September 1929 and closed on 30 April 1956.

It had a single cinder platform, with an old railway carriage used as a waiting room.

Preceding station	Historical railways	Following station
Hillsborough	Banbridge, Lisburn and Belfast Railway; Knockmore Junction-Banbridge	Magherabeg
