= Legatiriff Halt railway station =

Railway station in Northern Ireland

Legatiriff Halt

General information
- Location: Antrim; Northern Ireland
- Coordinates: 54.55969°N 6.21604°W
- Platforms: 1

Other information
- Status: Demolished

History
- Pre-grouping: Great Northern Railway (Ireland)

Key dates
- 1936: Station opened
- 12 September 1960: Station closed
Location

Legatiriff Halt railway station is a disused railway station located near Ballinderry, County Antrim, Northern Ireland. Opened in 1936 it was found on the Lisburn-Antrim line which had opened much earlier in 1871. The station was simple with a wooden platform and an old carriage as a waiting room. The station closed in 1960, on the same day as passenger services ended as a whole, although passenger services on the line ran again from 1974 to 2003. The station has since been demolished.

Preceding station	Disused railways	Following station
Ballinderry	Great Northern Railway (Ireland); Lisburn–Antrim	Glenavy
