= Lisburn West railway station =

Proposed railway station in Northern Ireland

Lisburn West

General information
- Location: Lisburn; Northern Ireland
- Coordinates: 54.508542°N 6.083975°W
- Owner: NI Railways
- Operator: NI Railways
- Platforms: 0
- NI Railways; Translink; NI railway stations
Location

Lisburn West is a proposed railway station planned for the Knockmore area of Lisburn, County Antrim, Northern Ireland. Originally proposed in 2014, early plans suggested that it would serve the Belfast–Newry railway line between Lisburn and Moira.

After Translink bought and demolished buildings on a former South Eastern Regional College site outside Lisburn, the company reportedly stated that station development works would commence "between late 2015 and early 2016". However, while plans were reportedly subsequently "resurrected", as of 2019 the proposed station site "remained vacant".

== See also ==
- Knockmore railway station

Preceding station	NI Railways	Following station
	Proposed	
Lisburn	Northern Ireland Railways; Belfast-Derry via Lisburn-Antrim line	Ballinderry
Lisburn	Northern Ireland Railways; Belfast-Newry	Moira
