= Aghanliss =

Coordinates: 54°33′30″N 6°11′54″W

- Location within Northern Ireland
- County: County Antrim
- Country: Northern Ireland
- Sovereign state: United Kingdom
- Police: Northern Ireland
- Fire: Northern Ireland
- Ambulance: Northern Ireland

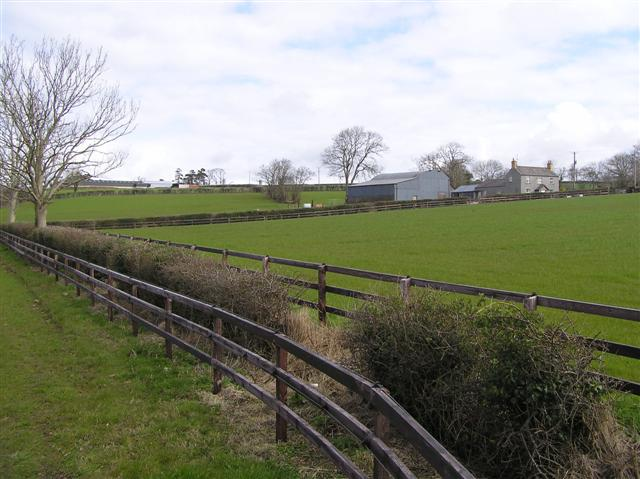
Aghanliss townland in 2008

Aghanliss is a townland in County Antrim, Northern Ireland. It is situated in the historic barony of Massereene Upper and the civil parish of Ballinderry and covers an area of 341 acres

The population of the townland decreased during the 19th century:

| Year | 1841 | 1851 | 1861 | 1871 | 1881 | 1891 |
|---|---|---|---|---|---|---|
| Population | 93 | 88 | 84 | 62 | 62 | 44 |
| Houses | 17 | 17 | 15 | 11 | 13 | 11 |

== See also ==
- List of townlands in County Antrim
