= Crumlin railway station =

Crumlin railway station may refer to:

- Crumlin railway station (Wales)
- Crumlin railway station (Northern Ireland)
