= Glenavy railway station =

Station in County Antrim, Northern Ireland

Coordinates: 54.588845°N 6.214802°W

Glenavy
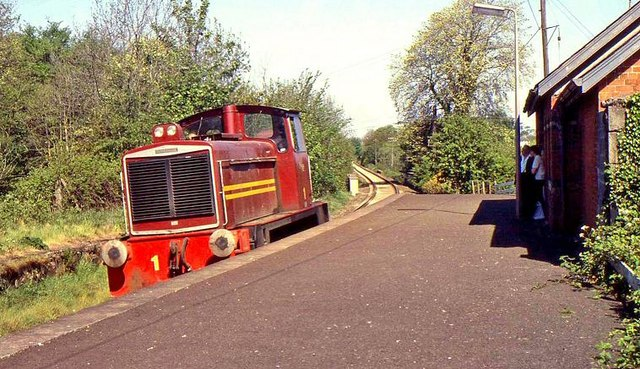
- Glenavy railway station in 1980

General information
- Location: Crumlin, Antrim; Northern Ireland
- Platforms: 1

Other information
- Status: Disused

History
- Pre-grouping: Northern Ireland Railways

Key dates
- 13 November 1871: Station opened
- June 2003: Station closed
Location

Glenavy railway station served Glenavy in County Antrim, Northern Ireland. The station is currently closed to passengers.

The station was built for the Dublin and Antrim Junction Railway and opened on 13 November 1871. Translink withdrew passenger services from the line when it reopened the more direct Belfast Lanyon Place (Known as Belfast Central at the time) – Antrim route via Bleach Green. Translink stated that it was unable to maintain two routes to Antrim and after operating a skeleton service on the route announced that it would be mothballed.

Preceding station	NI Railways	Following station
Legatiriff Halt	Northern Ireland Railways; Lisburn – Antrim (disused)	Crumlin
