= Crumlin railway station (Northern Ireland) =

Railway station in Crumlin, County Antrim, Northern Ireland

Crumlin
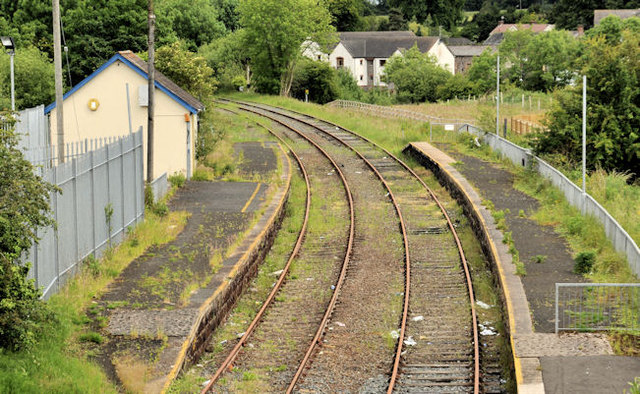
- Crumlin railway station in 2012

General information
- Location: Crumlin; County Antrim; Northern Ireland
- Coordinates: 54.6209°N 6.2118°E
- Line: Lisburn–Antrim railway line
- Distance: 10 miles 74 chains (17.6 km) from Knockmore Junction
- Platforms: 2

Construction
- Structure type: At-grade

Other information
- Status: Disused

History
- Original company: Dublin and Antrim Junction Railway
- Pre-grouping: Great Northern Railway (Ireland)
- Post-grouping: Great Northern Railway Board

Key dates
- 13 November 1871: Opened
- 12 September 1960: Regular passenger services withdrawn
- 28 January 1974: Reopened to passenger services
- June 2003: Regular passenger services withdrawn

Historical railways
Preceding station	Historical railways	Following station
Aldergrove; Line open, station closed	Dublin and Antrim Junction Railway; Lisburn–Antrim (1871–1879)	Glenavy; Line open, station closed
Aldergrove; Line open, station closed	Ulster Railway; Working the Dublin and Antrim Junction Railway (1871–1876)	Glenavy; Line open, station closed
Aldergrove; Line open, station closed	Great Northern Railway (Ireland); Lisburn–Antrim (1876–1953)	Glenavy; Line open, station closed
Aldergrove; Line open, station closed	Great Northern Railway Board; Lisburn–Antrim (1953–1958)	Glenavy; Line open, station closed
Aldergrove; Line open, station closed	Ulster Transport Authority; Lisburn–Antrim (1958–1960)	Glenavy; Line open, station closed
Antrim; Line and station open on the Derry line	NI Railways; Lisburn–Antrim (1974–2003)	Glenavy; Line open, station closed

Proposed services
Preceding station	NI Railways	Following station
Antrim; Station open	Lisburn–Antrim; Proposed reinstatement	Glenavy; Proposed reopening
Route map
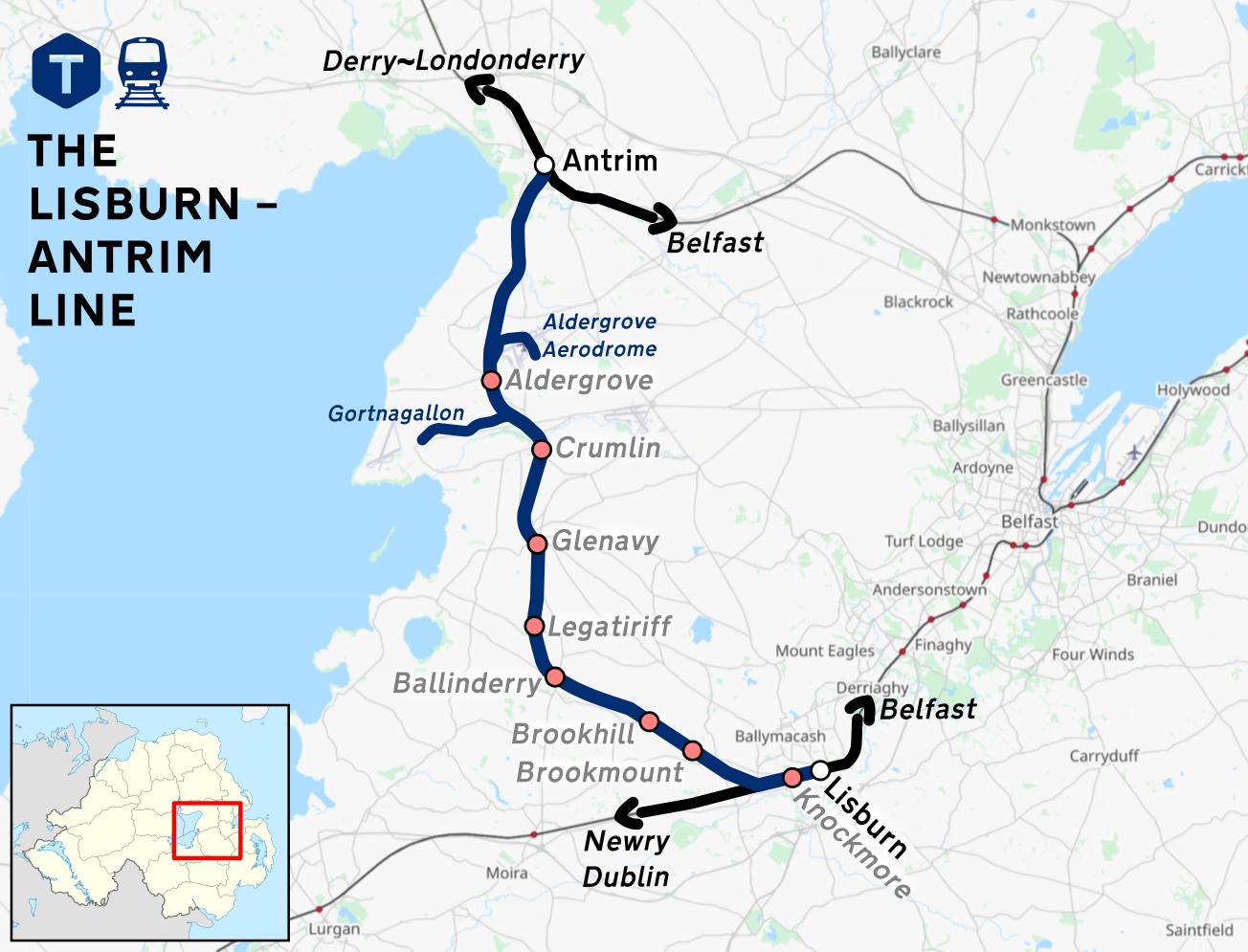
(Click to expand)
Location
- Location within Northern Ireland Location within island of Ireland

Crumlin railway station served Crumlin in County Antrim, Northern Ireland but is now closed to passengers.

The station was built for the Dublin and Antrim Junction Railway and opened on 13 November 1871. Translink withdrew passenger services from the line when it reopened the more direct Belfast Lanyon Place (Known as Belfast Central at the time) – Antrim route via Bleach Green. Translink stated that it was unable to maintain two routes to Antrim and after operating a skeleton service on the route announced that it would be mothballed.

In 2017, Northern Ireland Railways removed the passing loop here to make the line one long siding.

== Future proposals ==
The reopening of the Lisburn–Antrim railway line was included in the All-Island Strategic Rail Review, published in July 2024.

In 2025, Translink published a feasibility study examining the reinstatement of passenger services between Lisburn and Antrim, including a rail connection to Belfast International Airport. The study identified Crumlin as one of three former railway halts that could reopen, alongside Glenavy and Ballinderry. The proposals also included additional railway infrastructure and new stations elsewhere along the route.

The proposed reopening remains subject to further development and funding.
