= Massereene Upper =

Barony in Northern Ireland

Massereene Upper Mása Ríona Uachtarach (Irish)
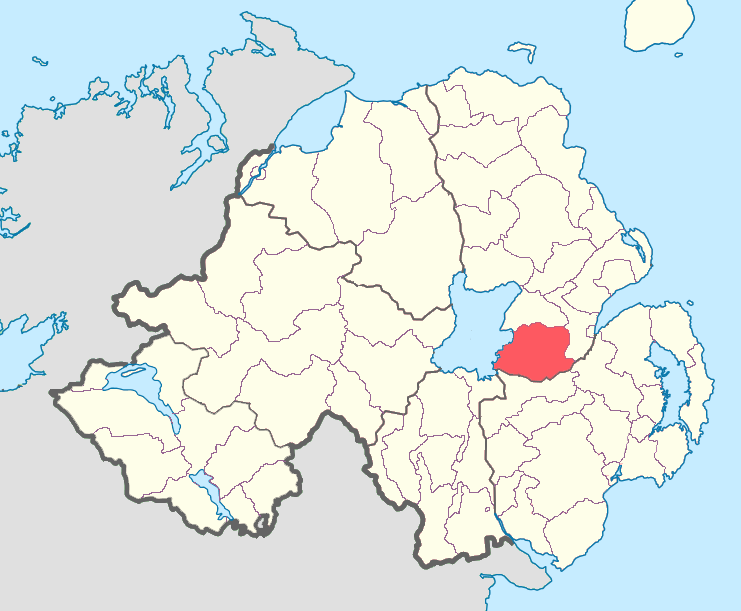
- Location of Massereene Upper, County Antrim, Northern Ireland.
- Sovereign state: United Kingdom
- Country: Northern Ireland
- County: Antrim

Massereene Upper is a barony in southwest County Antrim, Northern Ireland. It roughly matches the former district of Killultagh (Irish: Coill Ultaigh, meaning 'the woods of the Ulsterfolk'). It includes settlements such as Crumlin, Glenavy, Lower Ballinderry, Maghaberry and Aghalee. To its east lies Belfast Lough, and it is bordered by four other baronies: Massereene Lower to the north; Belfast Upper to the east; Castlereagh Upper to the south-east; and Iveagh Lower, Lower Half to the south-west.

== List of settlements ==
Below is a list of settlements in Massereene Upper:

=== Towns ===
- Crumlin
- Lisburn

=== Villages ===
- Aghagallon
- Aghalee
- Glenavy
- Maghaberry

=== Population centres ===
- Lower Ballinderry
- Upper Ballinderry
- Gawley's Gate
- Lane Ends
- Leathemstown
- Pond Park
- Stoneyford

== List of civil parishes ==
Below is a list of civil parishes in Massereene Upper:

- Aghagallon
- Aghalee
- Ballinderry
- Blaris (split with barony of Iveagh Lower, Lower Half)
- Camlin
- Derriaghy (also partly in barony of Belfast Upper)
- Glenavy
- Lambeg (split with barony of Castlereagh Upper)
- Magheragall
- Magheramesk
- Tullyrusk
