= Dromore Railway Station =

Railway station in County Down, Northern Ireland

Coordinates: 54.414682°N 6.157815°W

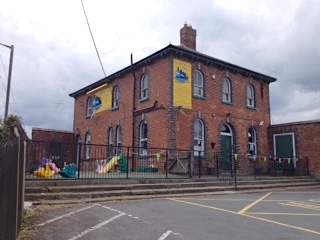
- Dromore Railway Station

General information
- Location: Church St., Dromore, County Down; Northern Ireland

Other information
- Status: Disused

History
- Original company: Banbridge, Lisburn and Belfast Junction Railway
- Pre-grouping: Great Northern Railway (Ireland)
- Post-grouping: Great Northern Railway (Ireland)

Key dates
- 13 July 1863: Station opens
- 30 April 1956: Station closes
Location

Dromore railway station was on the Banbridge, Lisburn and Belfast Junction Railway which ran from Knockmore Junction to Banbridge in Northern Ireland.

== History ==
The station was opened on 13 July 1863 and closed on 30 April 1956.

It had a two-road goods shed, three sidings, two passenger platforms and a signal cabin.

Preceding station	Historical railways	Following station
Magherabeg	Banbridge, Lisburn and Belfast Railway; Knockmore Junction-Banbridge	Ashfield Halt

== Viaduct ==
Immediately to the west of the station is Dromore Viaduct, which once carried trains across the River Lagan. At 74 ft tall and 7 arches long, it was the most noteworthy piece of engineering on the line.

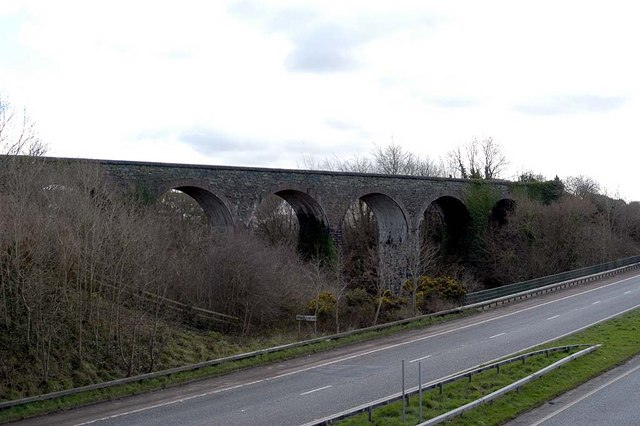

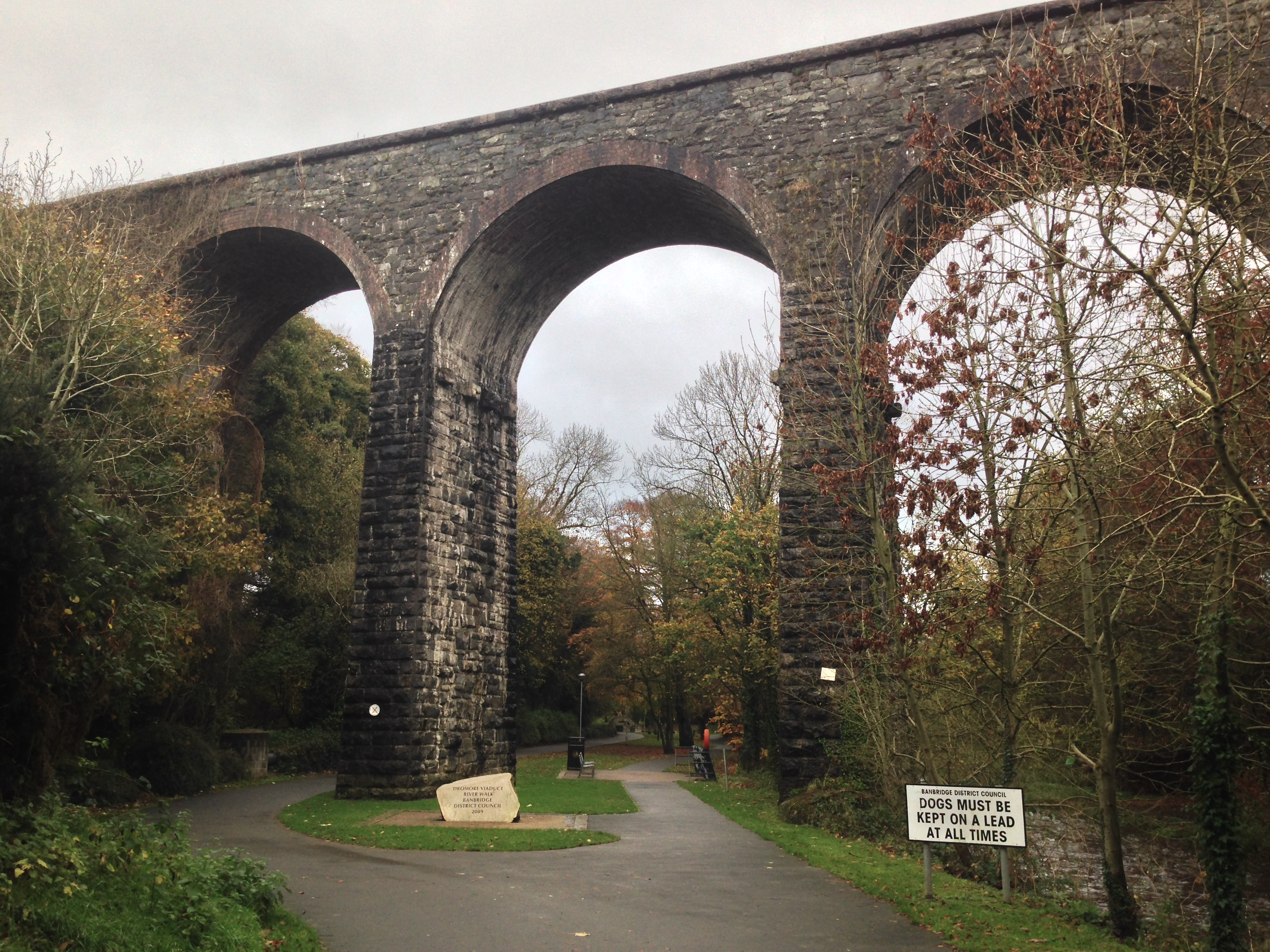

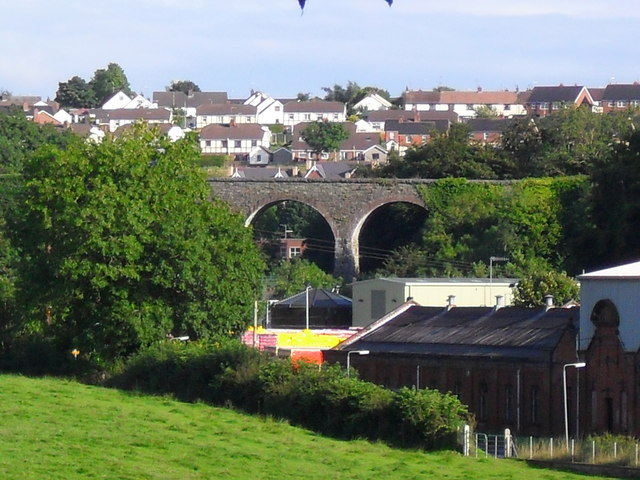

== The site today ==
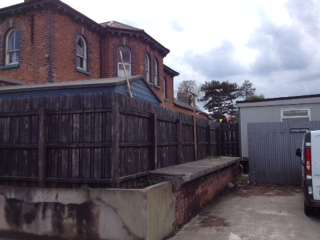
The remnants of the platform at the former Dromore Railway Station

The station building is in use today as a children's nursery, whilst part of the platform and the former station yard are used by a mechanics. The viaduct still stands, and Dromore Town Park passes beneath it.
