= Hillsborough railway station (Northern Ireland) =

Railway station in County Down, Northern Ireland

Hillsborough

General information
- Location: Hillsborough, County Down; Northern Ireland
- Coordinates: 54.470797°N 6.087096°W

Other information
- Status: Disused

History
- Original company: Banbridge, Lisburn and Belfast Railway
- Pre-grouping: Great Northern Railway (Ireland)
- Post-grouping: Great Northern Railway (Ireland)

Key dates
- 13 July 1863: Station opens
- 30 April 1956: Station closes
Location

Hillsborough railway station was on the Banbridge, Lisburn and Belfast Railway which ran from Knockmore Junction to Banbridge in Northern Ireland.

== History ==
The station was opened by the Banbridge, Lisburn and Belfast Railway on 13 July 1863. The station served Hillsborough, County Down.

The station closed on 30 April 1956. The station has been proposed to reopen as part of a high-speed loop on the Belfast–Dublin line in the All-Island Strategic Rail Review, published in July 2024.

Preceding station	Historical railways	Following station
Newport	Banbridge, Lisburn and Belfast Railway; Knockmore Junction-Banbridge	Ballygowan Halt
