= Lisburn–Antrim line =

Railway line in Northern Ireland

Lisburn to Antrim line
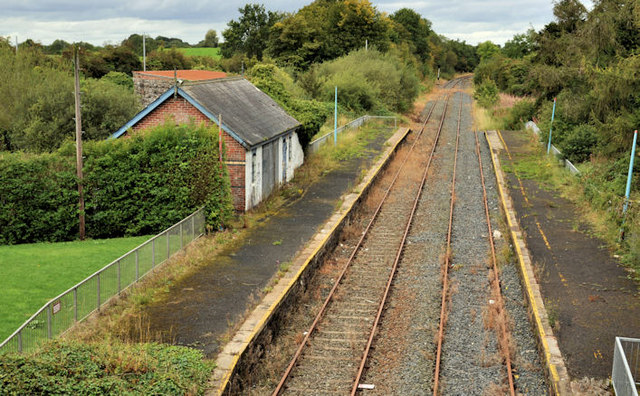
- The closed station at Ballinderry

Overview
- Status: Closed to passenger services
- Locale: Northern Ireland
- Termini: Lisburn; Antrim
- Stations: 6 prior to closure

Service
- Type: Commuter rail Regional rail Heavy rail
- System: NI Railways
- Services: 1
- Operator: NI Railways

History
- Closed: June 2003

Technical
- Num of tracks: Single-track
- Track gauge: 1,600 mm (5 ft 3 in) Irish gauge
- Electrification: Un-electrified
- Operating speed: 70 mph (110 km/h)
Route map
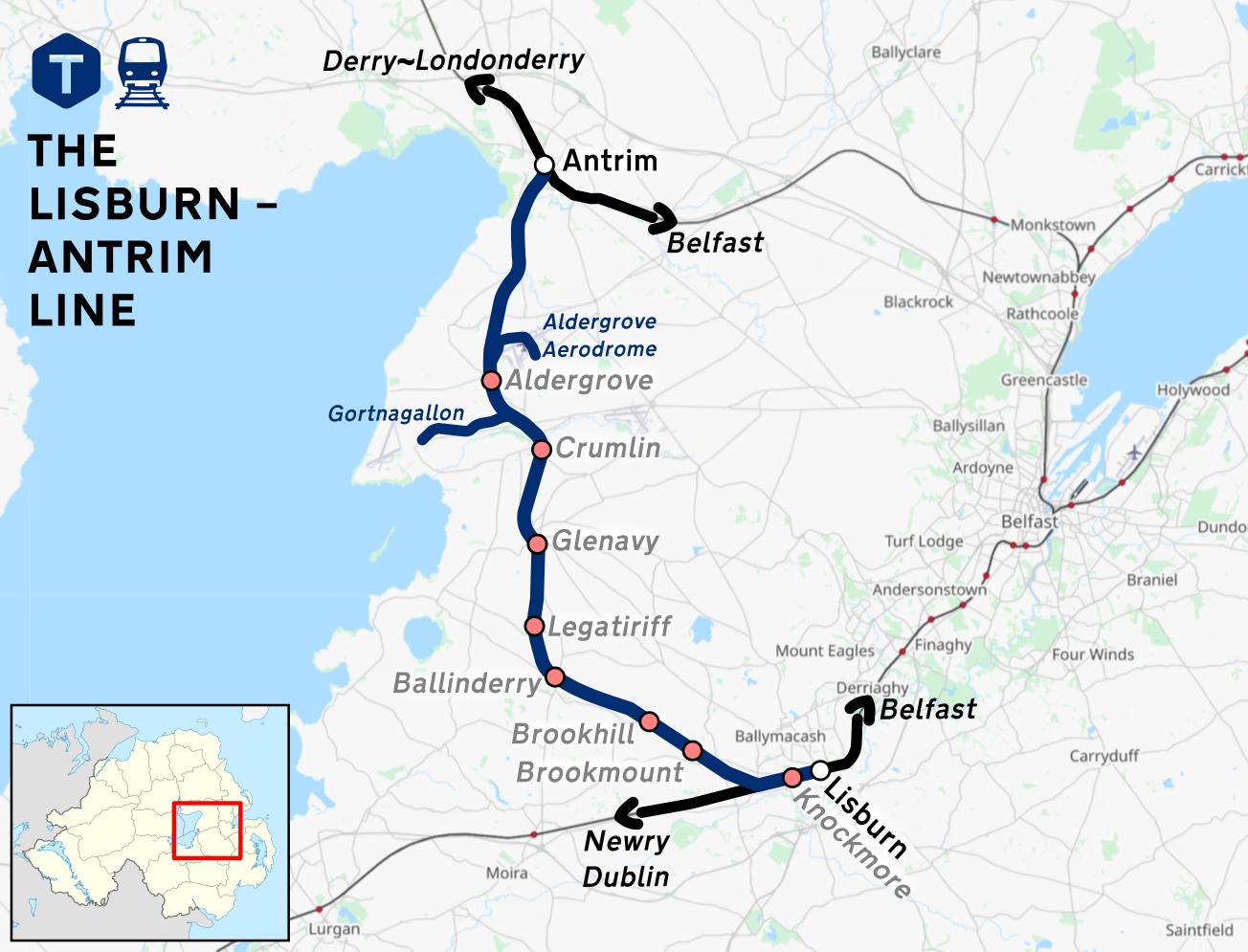
(Click to expand)

The Lisburn–Antrim line is a 20-mile (32 km) railway line of Northern Ireland Railways. It links Knockmore Junction on the Belfast–Newry line with Antrim on the Belfast–Derry line. It has been closed to passenger services since 2003.

== History ==
Dublin and Antrim Junction Railway Act 1861
- Act of Parliament
- Parliament of the United Kingdom
- Long title: An Act for making a Railway from the Ulster Railway near Lisburn to the Belfast and Northern Counties Railway at Antrim, to be called "The Dublin and Antrim Junction Railway," and for other Purposes.
- Citation: 24 & 25 Vict. c. cxxii

Dates
- Royal assent: 11 July 1861

The line was authorised by the Dublin and Antrim Junction Railway Act 1861 (24 & 25 Vict. c. cxxii) and opened in 1871 as the Dublin and Antrim Junction Railway. The train service on the line was provided by the Ulster Railway until 1876, and by the Ulster Railway's successor the Great Northern Railway thereafter. In 1879 the D&A Junction ceased to be a separate company and was absorbed by the GNR.

== Current status ==
The line is currently closed to passengers after all rail services were withdrawn from the line in June 2003. The stations at Knockmore, Ballinderry, Legatiriff Halt, Glenavy and Crumlin have all been closed.

Translink's reason for closing the line was that it was unable to maintain two routes to Antrim economically. The Bleach Green–Antrim line, which had been closed since 1978, was reopened in 2001, providing a faster route between Belfast Central (now Lanyon Place), Antrim and Derry~Londonderry. Translink operated a skeleton service on the line, but then gave notice that it would be shut.

The route is still maintained and is used for crew training and train diversions, for example, for passenger services on 9 and 23 October 2011 when there were weekend engineering works at Mossley West. Speculation remains that the line could one day re-open under plans to operate a Belfast – Lisburn – Antrim – Belfast circular route, with the possibility of a station for Belfast International Airport which is close to the line at Aldergrove.

In 2012, a section of railway embankment, weakened by weather near Knockmore, gave way as a train was about to pass over. The driver managed to stop and reverse the train away without incident. The embankment has since been repaired.

In January 2015, the two passing loops on the line, at Crumlin and Ballinderry, were decommissioned and removed, leaving no more passing points on the line.

On Monday 12 September 2016, the Democratic Unionist Party announced that they would propose a motion to re-open the line as part of an Airport Link. It could mean that services could resume on the line in the near future. It would likely mean that Knockmore would be replaced by the new Lisburn West station at the site of the old SERC building a little further down the line.

On Sunday 10 November 2019, units 3002+3003 worked a radio test train over the NIR network, including the Lisburn to Antrim line with the stations Lisburn West, Ballinderry, Glenavy, Crumlin and Belfast International Airport being included.

In late 2022, Translink showed timelined plans for the 'Lisburn Area Renewals'. The work is set to start in October 2022 and last until spring of 2024. Maps from Translink showed an 'Antrim Branch' is to receive new bi-directional railway signalling. This development is to be combined with plans for a Lisburn West Station.

On 1 March 2023, the Alliance Party announced that MLA David Honeyford had secured a commitment from Translink to undertake a feasibility study into reopening the Knockmore Line.

On 19 June 2023, FundTheNINE posted on their Twitter detailing a meeting they had with Translink four days prior. FundTheNINE revealed that 'Translink hope to appoint a consultant to undertake the feasibility study within the next 6 months, with the feasibility study taking around 8 months to complete...the overall timeframe for reopening the Knockmore Line is around 4–6 years from the time of the meeting'.

On 4 March 2025, Infrastructure Minister Liz Kimmins confirmed in the Northern Ireland Assembly that the feasibility study into reopening the Knockmore Line was nearing completion. The study, funded by the UK Department for Transport's Union Connectivity Fund, is examining the potential reopening of Ballinderry, Glenavy, and Crumlin stations, as well as appraising three possible locations for a new station at Belfast International Airport.

== Bibliography ==
- Hajducki, S Maxwell (1974). A Railway Atlas of Ireland. Newton Abbot: David & Charles. map 5, map 9, page xiii. ISBN 0-7153-5167-2.
