= Upper Ballinderry =

Village in County Antrim, Northern Ireland

Coordinates: 54°32′N 6°13′W

Upper Ballinderry: Irish: Baile an Doire Uachtarach
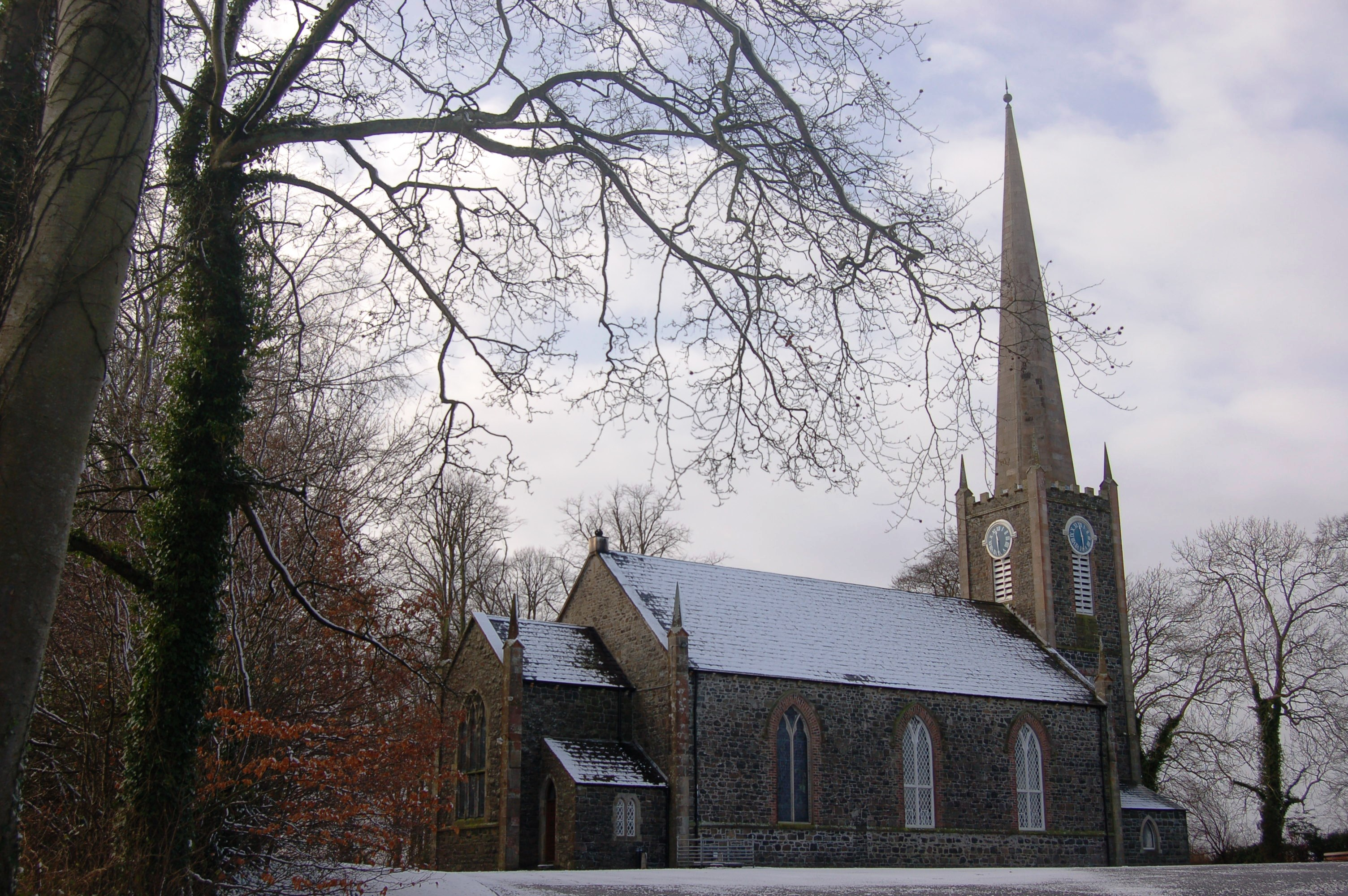
- Ballinderry Parish Church, built 1824

- Location within Northern Ireland
- Population: (2011 Census)
- County: County Antrim
- Country: Northern Ireland
- Sovereign state: United Kingdom
- Post town: LISBURN
- Postcode district: BT28
- Dialling code: 028
- Police: Northern Ireland
- Fire: Northern Ireland
- Ambulance: Northern Ireland

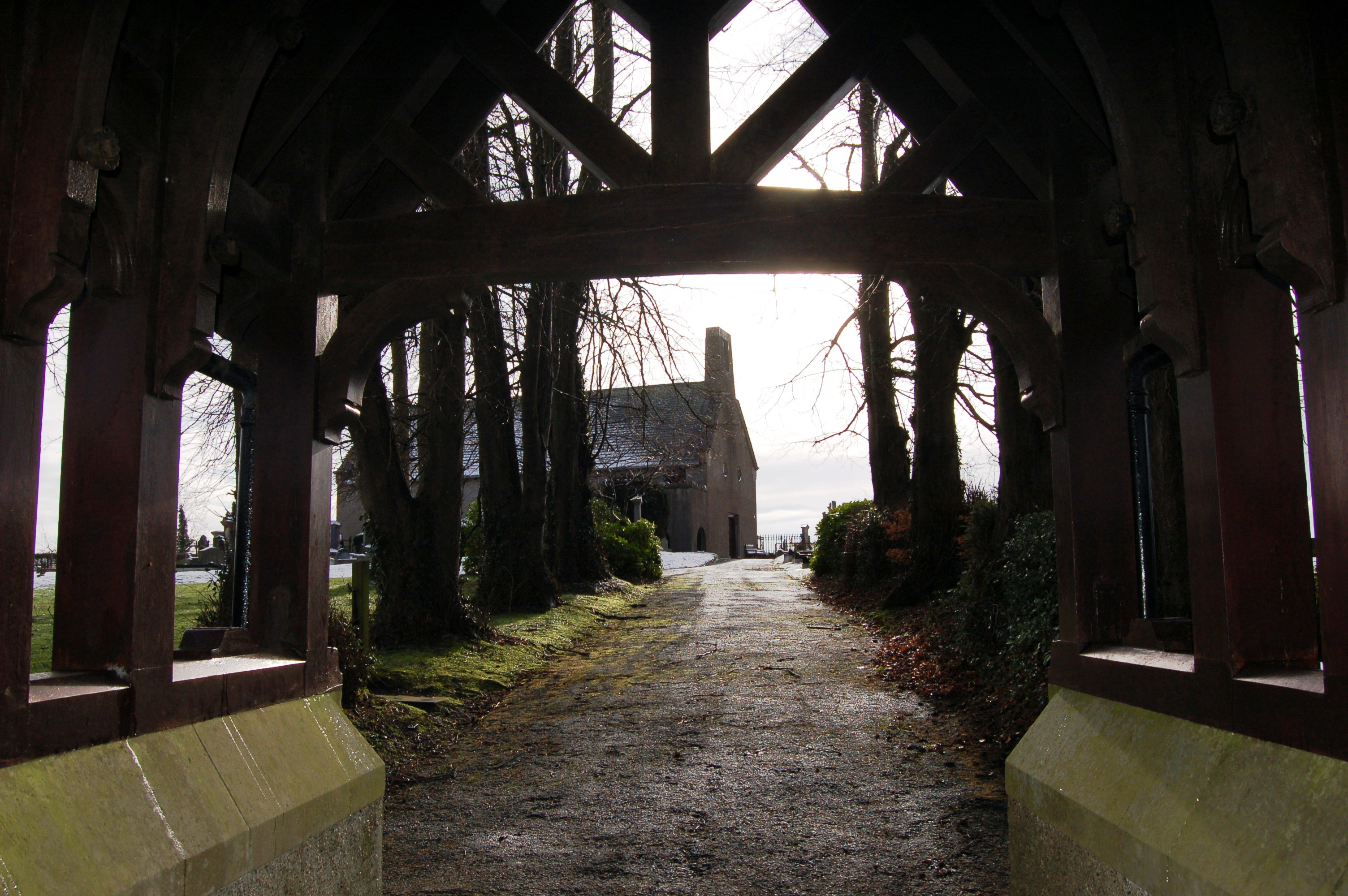
Ballinderry Middle Church, built 1668

Upper Ballinderry (from Irish Baile an Doire, meaning 'townland of the oak grove') is a small village to the east of Lower Ballinderry in County Antrim, Northern Ireland. It is within the townland of Ballyscolly and civil parish of Ballinderry, the historic barony of Massereene Upper. Upper Ballinderry is about 10 miles (15 km) north- west of Lisburn. In the 2001 Census it had a population of 192 people.

It is a mill village, developed around a crossroads with a prominent church, mill building and estate. The A26 road bypasses the village to the east. Upper Ballinderry is situated on relatively flat land rising gradually to the east. The village has developed in a linear form on both sides of North Street and is contained by the Glenavy Road to the east and the disused railway line to the north. The original road has been realigned with the more recent Glenavy Road situated to the east of the earlier route.

Locally significant buildings include Ballinderry Parish Church (built 1824) and Glebe House, which are listed buildings, and Fruithill House, Rosevale, Oatland Cottage, Church View House, and converted mill buildings and outhouses.

== Transport ==
The nearby Ballinderry railway station, which opened on 13 November 1871, is currently closed.

The Ulsterbus service from Lisburn to Antrim/Belfast passes through the area on an hourly basis.

== See also ==
- List of towns and villages in Northern Ireland
- Lower Ballinderry
