= Lower Ballinderry =

Village in County Antrim, Northern Ireland

Coordinates: 54°32′39″N 6°15′25″W

Lower Ballinderry: Irish: Baile an Doire Íochtarach
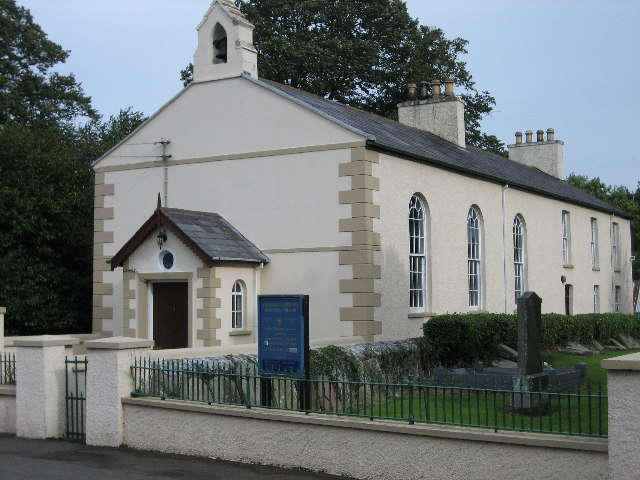
- Ballinderry Moravian Church

- Location within Northern Ireland
- Population: (2011 Census)
- County: County Antrim
- Country: Northern Ireland
- Sovereign state: United Kingdom
- Post town: LISBURN
- Postcode district: BT28
- Dialling code: 028
- Police: Northern Ireland
- Fire: Northern Ireland
- Ambulance: Northern Ireland

Lower Ballinderry (from Irish: Baile an Doire, meaning "townland of the oak grove") is a small village to the west of Upper Ballinderry in County Antrim, Northern Ireland. It is within the townland and civil parish of Ballinderry and the historic barony of Massereene Upper. The village lies a short distance to the southeast of Portmore Lough (a.k.a. Lough Beg) and Lough Neagh, 12 kilometres (7.5 mi) west of Lisburn. In the 2011 census it had a population of 912.

The village sits at a crossroads that linked the medieval church site of Aghagallon (Ballinderry Old Graveyard), and later to the Plantation site of Portmore Castle. The village has at its core Ballinderry Moravian Church, a listed building, which, along with other listed structures, forms a distinct core to the settlement around the crossroads. It has a pre-eminently 18th century character, visible in buildings, in form and layout, and in the lime tree plantings.

The local primary school is Lower Ballinderry Primary School. There is an Ulsterbus service between Lower Ballinderry and Lisburn as well as Lower Ballinderry and Lurgan.

== See also ==
- List of towns and villages in Northern Ireland
- Upper Ballinderry
