= Ballinderry, County Antrim =

Civil parish and townland in County Antrim, Northern Ireland

Coordinates: 54°32′N 6°13′W

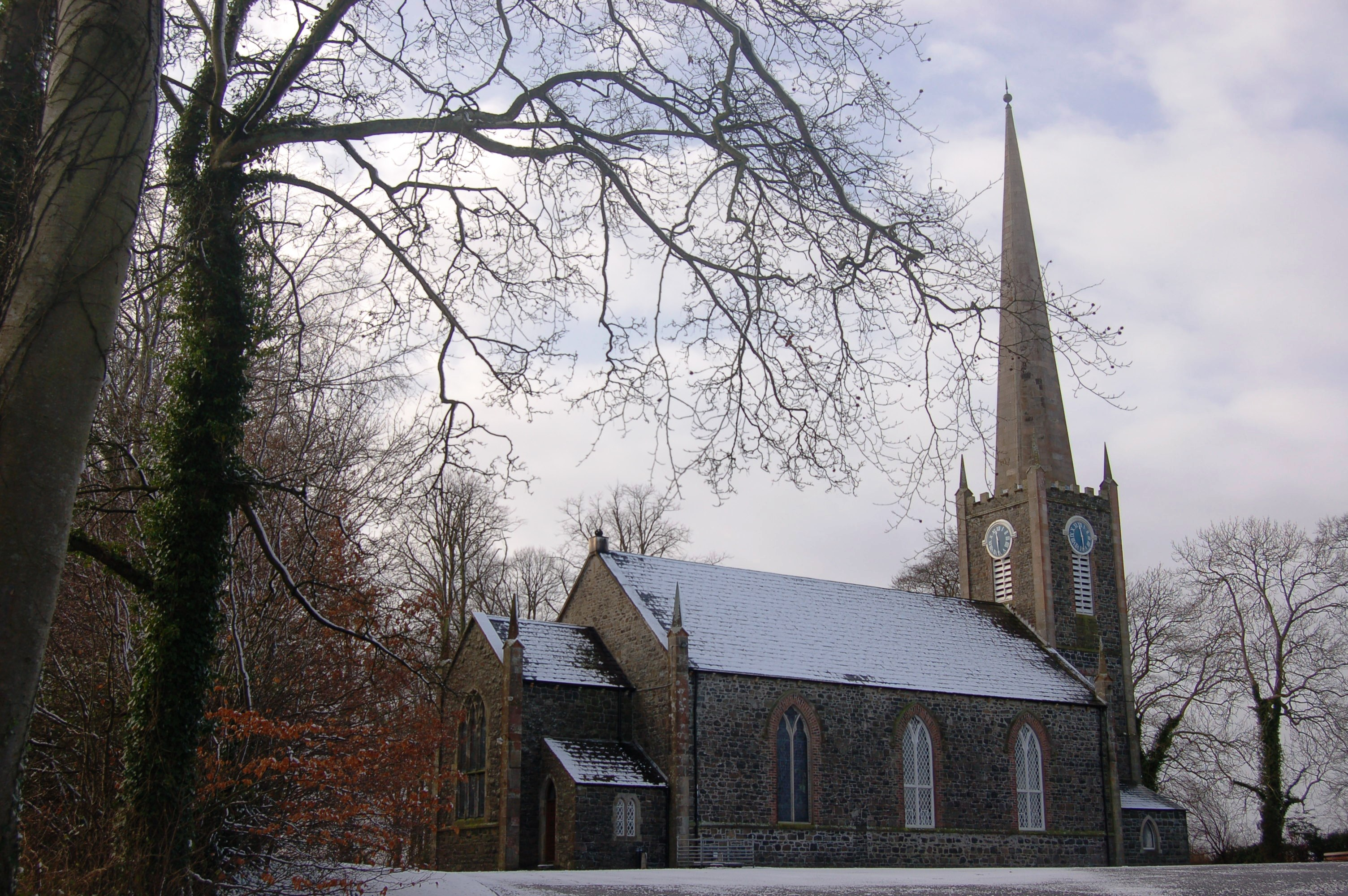
- Ballinderry Parish Church
- County: County Antrim
- Country: Northern Ireland
- Sovereign state: United Kingdom
- Police: Northern Ireland
- Fire: Northern Ireland
- Ambulance: Northern Ireland

Ballinderry is a civil parish and townland (of 1182 acres) in County Antrim, Northern Ireland. It is 7 miles (11 km) west of Lisburn, in the historic barony of Massereene Upper.

== Civil parish of Ballinderry ==
The civil parish contains the villages of:

- Lower Ballinderry
- Upper Ballinderry

== Townlands ==
The civil parish contains the following townlands:

- Aghacarnan, Aghadavy, Aghanamoney, Aghanliss
- Ballinderry, Ballykelly, Ballylacky, Ballymaclose, Ballymacrevan, Ballyscolly, Brackenhill
- Cluntirriff, Crew Park
- Derrykillultagh, Drumanduff
- Gortrany
- Kilcreeny
- Legatirriff, Loughrelisk, Lurganteneil, Lurgill
- Moneycrumog, Moygarriff
- Portmore
- Templecormac, Tullyballydonnell

== Notable people ==
- Samuel Kelly, coal merchant and businessman

== See also ==
- List of townlands of County Antrim
- List of civil parishes of County Antrim
