= Knockmore railway station =

Disused railway station in Lisburn, Northern Ireland

Knockmore
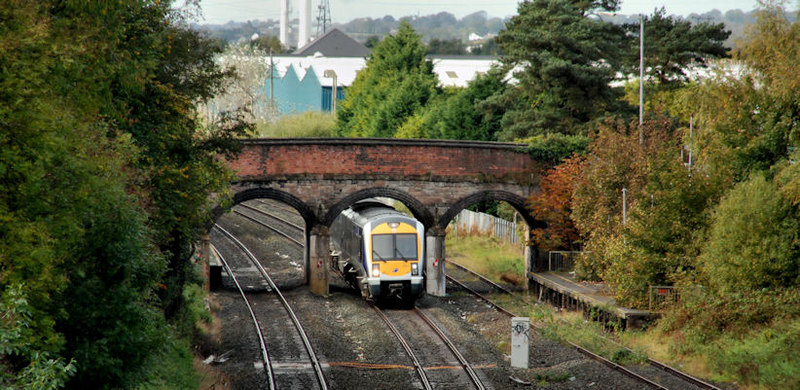
- A Class 3000 train passing the remains of Knockmore station in 2010

General information
- Location: Ballinderry Road; Lisburn, County Antrim; Northern Ireland
- Coordinates: 54.5113°N 6.0690°W
- Lines: Dublin–Belfast railway line Lisburn–Antrim railway line Knockmore–Banbridge line (historic junction)
- Distance: 104 miles 6 chains (167.5 km) from Dublin Connolly (main line)
- Platforms: 2
- Tracks: 3

Other information
- Status: Disused

History
- Original company: Great Northern Railway (Ireland)

Key dates
- 2 October 1932: Original halt opened
- 1 November 1933: Original halt closed
- 1 July 1974: New halt opened at a different site
- June 2003: Antrim branch services withdrawn
- 25 March 2005: Closed

Historical railways
Preceding station	Historical railways	Following station
Maze; Line open, station closed	Great Northern Railway (Ireland); Belfast–Portadown (1932–1933)	Lisburn; Line and station open
Moira; Line and station open	NI Railways; Belfast–Portadown (1974–2005); Portadown-bound services only	Lisburn; Line and station open
Ballinderry; Regular passenger services withdrawn	NI Railways; Lisburn–Antrim (1974–2003)	Lisburn; Line and station open
Preceding station	Historical junction connection	Following station
Lisburn; Line and station open	Great Northern Railway (Ireland); Knockmore–Banbridge; Junction connection, not confirmed station service (1932–1933)	Newport Halt; Line and station closed
Route map
Location
- Location within Northern Ireland Location within island of Ireland

Knockmore railway station was a station on the Belfast-Dublin railway line. The station served the suburb of Knockmore in Lisburn, County Antrim, Northern Ireland. The Great Northern Railway (GNR) opened Knockmore station as a halt in 1932. Northern Ireland Railways (NIR) closed the station on 25 March 2005.

Knockmore station had two platforms. One platform was served by trains travelling from Belfast Central via Lisburn to Portadown, while the other platform was served by trains in both directions on the Belfast–Lisburn–Antrim–Derry~Londonderry service. Trains travelling from Portadown to Belfast could not serve Knockmore, as there was no platform on the middle line.

== History ==
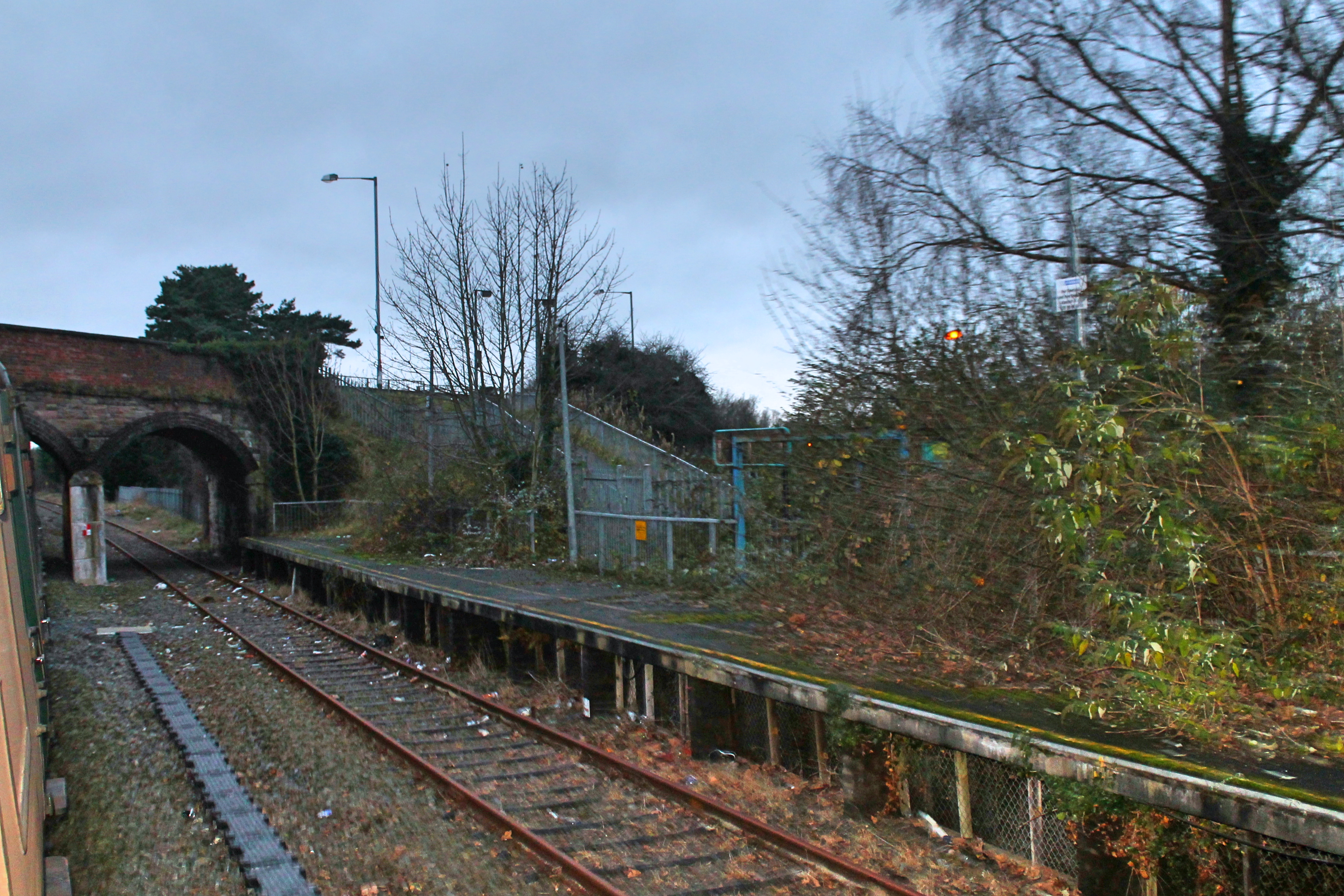
The remains of the halt as seen from a passing steam special, December 2013.

The station is near Knockmore Junction, which came into service in 1863 for the Banbridge, Lisburn and Belfast Junction Railway (BLB) to connect with the Ulster Railway. The junction gained another branch in 1871 when the Dublin and Antrim Junction Railway (D&A, now the Lisburn–Antrim railway line) was opened. The Ulster Railway, BLB and D&A all became part of the GNR by the end of the 1870s. A halt was finally provided at Knockmore Junction in 1932, but it did not last long and was closed a year later. The GNR was nationalised in 1953 as the GNR Board, which closed the Banbridge branch on 29 April 1956.

In 1960, the Antrim branch was closed to passenger traffic, although it remained open for freight. By this point, the line was under UTA control, all GNR assets in Northern Ireland having been transferred to the UTA in 1958. In 1967, the UTA's railway operations were transferred to Northern Ireland Railways, which reopened the Antrim branch in 1974. A new Knockmore halt was built on a different site to the original, slightly closer to Lisburn. Instead of using a crossover as per the original setup, a third line was laid directly from the former junction to Lisburn station. This required the demolition of Knockmore Junction signal cabin.

In 2001, NIR reopened the more direct Belfast–Antrim route via Whiteabbey. An attempt was made to keep the Antrim–Knockmore line open alongside it using a skeleton service, but this was unsuccessful and NIR withdrew passenger services altogether in June 2003. Due to the platform layout, this left Knockmore station with a train service in only one direction, from Belfast to Portadown. This arrangement was not well-used, and so on 25 March 2005, NIR closed Knockmore station.

The Portadown-bound platform was demolished in 2012, with the branch platform following in 2014.

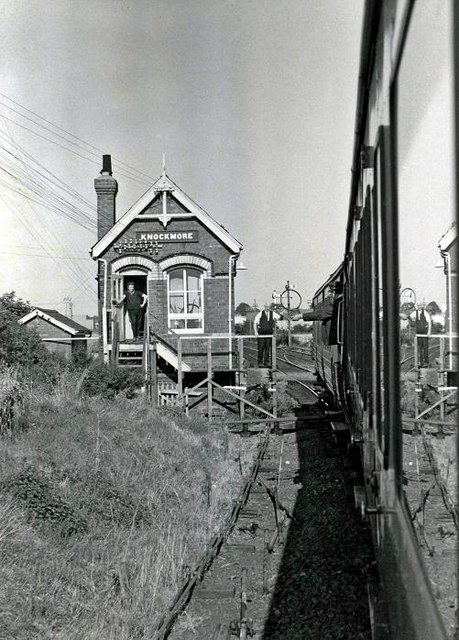
Knockmore Junction signal cabin in 1977, with a single line token being surrendered to the signalman on a Lisburn–Antrim railway line working from Antrim back to Lisburn.

== Incidents ==
- On 28 June 2012, a section of embankment near Knockmore was washed out by heavy rain, leaving a short length of track unsupported. Due to the Irish Open, Translink had put on extra trains to Portrush, some of which were scheduled to use the Antrim branch. The first of these specials was not able to stop in time and crossed over the unsupported track, with the leading vehicle coming to a stop with one bogie on either side of the unsupported section. The train was slowly reversed away, and nobody was injured.
- On 4 February 2016, a Portadown-bound train collided with an excavator bucket which had been left on the track near Knockmore Junction. The train struck the bucket at approximately 57 miles per hour (92 km/h) and came to a stop 330 metres (1,080 ft) from the point of collision. The leading vehicle was badly damaged, although the train remained upright. No significant injuries were reported.

== The Great Northern Railway to Banbridge and Newcastle ==
The Banbridge, Lisburn and Belfast Railway opened the line from Knockmore Junction towards Hillsborough on 13 July 1863.

On 29 April 1956, the line via Dromore to Banbridge and Newcastle closed to passenger services under the Great Northern Railway Board.

== See also ==
- Lisburn West railway station
  - The Great Northern Mainline (Belfast-Dublin line)

== Sources ==
- Baker, Michael H.C. (1972). Irish Railways since 1916. London: Ian Allan. ISBN 0 7110 0282 7.
- Hajducki, S. Maxwell (1974). A Railway Atlas of Ireland. Newton Abbott: David & Charles. ISBN 0-7153-5167-2.
