= Crumlin, County Antrim =

Town in County Antrim, Northern Ireland

Coordinates: 54.62°N 6.23°W

Crumlin: Irish: Cromghlinn
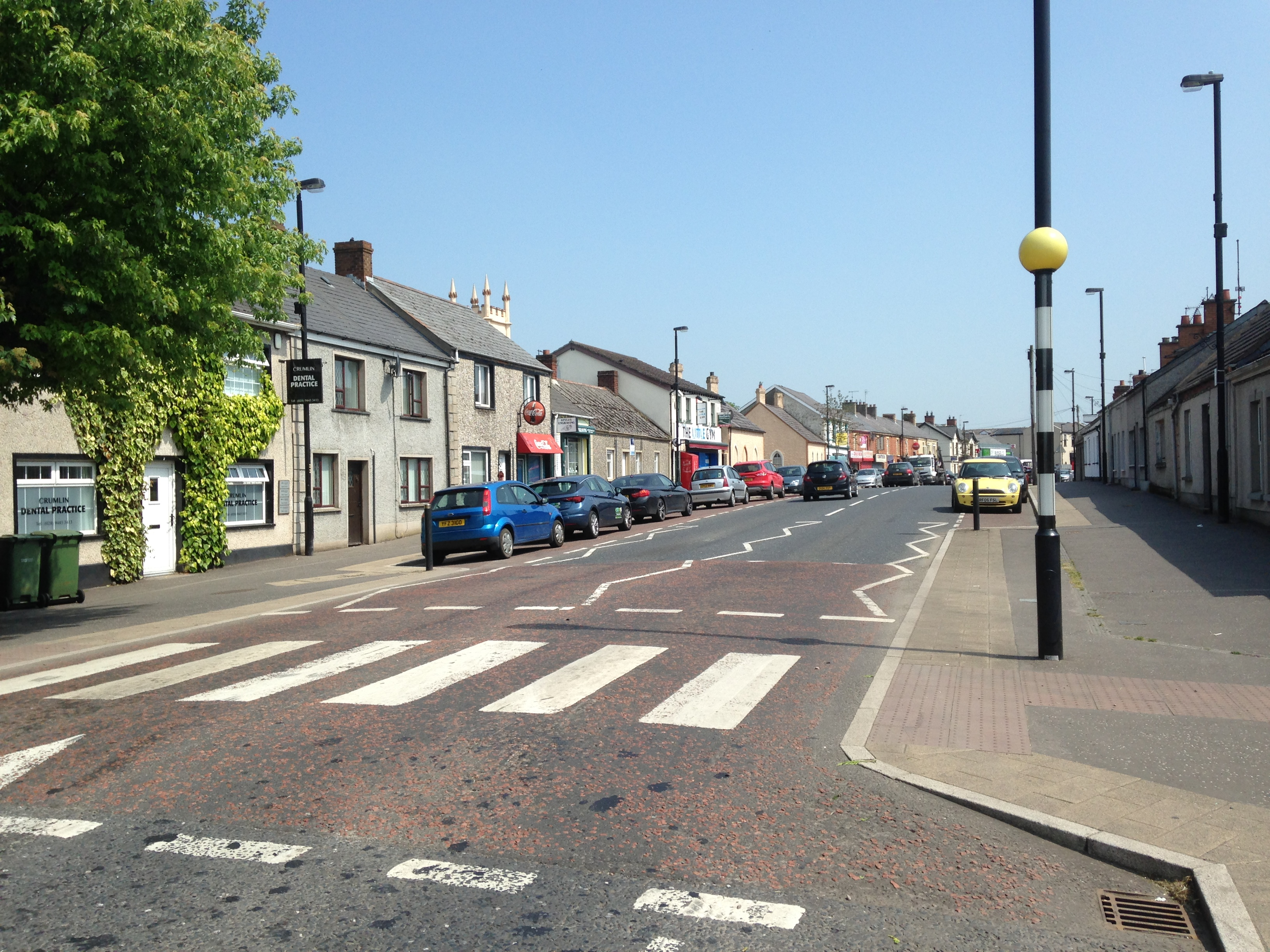
- Main Street

- Location within Northern Ireland
- Population: 5,366 (2021 census)
- District: Antrim and Newtownabbey
- County: County Antrim
- Country: Northern Ireland
- Sovereign state: United Kingdom
- Post town: CRUMLIN
- Postcode district: BT29
- Dialling code: 028
- UK Parliament: South Antrim
- NI Assembly: South Antrim

Crumlin (from Irish Cromghlinn, meaning 'crooked glen') is a town in County Antrim, Northern Ireland. It is near the shore of Lough Neagh, 20 miles (32 km) west of Belfast city centre and 3 miles (4.6 km) from Belfast International Airport at Aldergrove. It was formerly served by Crimlin railway station. Crumlin is part of Antrim and Newtownabbey district, and had a population of 5,366 at the 2021 census.

== History ==
There are records of a settlement at Crumlin going back to at least 1306. The Taxation of the Dioceses, compiled in that year 1306, notes "The Church of Camelyn, 2 marks, Tenth 2s. 8d." Bishop Reeves says, "It is so called from a tortuous stream" (the crooked line). Camlin was anciently a Bishop's Mensal, and services were held in the church up to 1661, but it was destroyed by the army of King James II in 1689 after which the locals moved to Glenavy Parish Church.

According to a survey carried out in 1808, it had a population of 430 people, a school and a post-office. Linen weaving and labouring were the main forms of employment. By 1849 it had its own electoral division.

The town's old linen mill was built in 1809.

A stone clock tower, built in 1897 as a memorial to a member of the Pakenham family who were landlords in the area, stands at the top of the town near the former railway station.

On 13 September 1902, the Crumlin meteorite landed near the village. When it first hit the atmosphere it was travelling at 30,000 miles an hour, and the sonic boom was heard up to 10 miles away. Locals heard various strange noises and some of them likened it to a train running off the track or a boiler exploding in the nearby mill or a swarm of bees. It landed on Andrew Walker's farm and was soon bought and taken away to the Natural History Museum in London. It has now been loaned to the Ulster Museum in Belfast for 3 years and came back to Northern Ireland in February 2023.

In 1972, during The Troubles, a bomb went off prematurely near Crumlin, killing two IRA members.

Crumlin's proximity to Belfast has led to it becoming a local business area, with international venues, including hosting the headquarters of Randox Laboratories and Lidl in Northern Ireland.

== Education ==
Schools in the area include:

- Crumlin Integrated College
- St. Joseph's Primary School
- Crumlin Integrated Primary
- Gaelscoil Ghleann Darach
- Naíscoil Ghleann Darach
- Sleepy Hollow Day Nursery

=== Irish language ===
In recent years, a growing Irish-speaking community has evolved in the area and Crumlin now caters for both pre-school and primary school education through the medium of Irish. Naíscoil and Gaelscoil Ghleann Darach now has almost 70 children attending the Irish medium school and almost 30 in the nursery, with 15 members of staff. The Gaelscoil (primary school) is recognised by the Department of Education.

Two voluntary groups, Cumann Gaeilge and Cairde Ghleann Darach, encourage and support the school and promotion of the Irish language. The local societies help organise fund-raisers for the local schools and clubs and organise Irish language classes, an annual Irish language funday, a céilí, a bi-lingual pub quiz, and other events in the area.

== Sport ==
Crumlin United F.C provides association football for more than 300 men, women, boys and girls, from under-6 to senior level. Broader membership of approx. 400. Crumlin United own a 9-acre ground with grass playing surfaces and a full size 3G playing service. The team entered the County Antrim Senior Shield in 2018, bringing competitive Senior Football to the town of Crumlin for the first time in history.

St James' Aldergrove GAC is a well established Gaelic Athletic Association with 13 teams incorporating men's and ladies football as well as being strongly represented at all levels underage. The club currently has a player base in excess of 300 and broader membership of approx. 500. The Club provides structured Gaelic football for boys and girls, as well as social and cultural events. The senior men's team was promoted to Division 1 in 2012 for the first time in the club's history and stayed there until relegation in 2017. They also won the Antrim Intermediate Championship in 2019 for the first time since 1977 and represented Antrim in the Ulster Intermediate Championship.

Crumlin river hosts fishing and angling for salmon and dollaghan.

Community Netball is also offered Crumlin Leisure Centre as well as martial arts.

== Community relations ==
In the past, Orange Order parades occurred without incident and the main street in July is decorated with an Orange Arch which flies unionist flags from it.

In 2012, The Twelfth celebration for a wider area was held in Crumlin for the first time in 12 years, a march which surpassed previous parades in terms of size and the number of bands and participants taking part. Some pre-march tension was evident and a Parades Commission determination appeared to rule in favour of the residents opposed to the parade based on its size and because they felt they weren't given adequate notice by the organisers of the parade.

Talks were held between the residents and organisers, leading to the parade passing off peacefully. The agreement was heralded as a success and as a possible blueprint for other contentious marches.

== Demography ==
As of the 2021 census, Crumlin had a population of 5,366 people. Of these:

- 80.0% were from a Catholic background and 13.6% were from a Protestant or other Christian background.
- 63.7% identified as Irish, 17.4% identified as British and 25.0% identified as Northern Irish.

As the time of the 2011 census, Crumlin had a population of 5,140 people (1,777 households). On Census day in 2011:

- 27.4% were aged under 16 and 9.5% were aged 65 and over
- 48.3% of the population were male and 51.7% were female
- 80.3% were from a Catholic background and 16.7% were from a Protestant or other Christian background
- 4.2% of people aged 16–74 were unemployed.
- 98.8% of the population are Caucasian
- 2.1% of residents were born outside Britain or Ireland

Crumlin has several churches, including Presbyterian, Church of Ireland, Evangelical Presbyterian and Non-Subscribing. Catholic Mass is held regularly at St Joseph's Primary School.

== Transport ==
Crumlin railway station opened on 13 November 1871 but is now closed.

Translink runs an Ulsterbus service from Crumlin to Lisburn, Antrim, Belfast International Airport and Belfast city centre.

== Notable people ==
- James Dickey (1775/1776–1798), Presbyterian barrister and United Irishman
- Peter FitzGerald (born 1950), biochemist and businessman, founder and owner of Randox
