= Ballinderry railway station =

Railway station in County Antrim, Northern Ireland

Coordinates: 54.544153°N 6.20344°W

Ballinderry
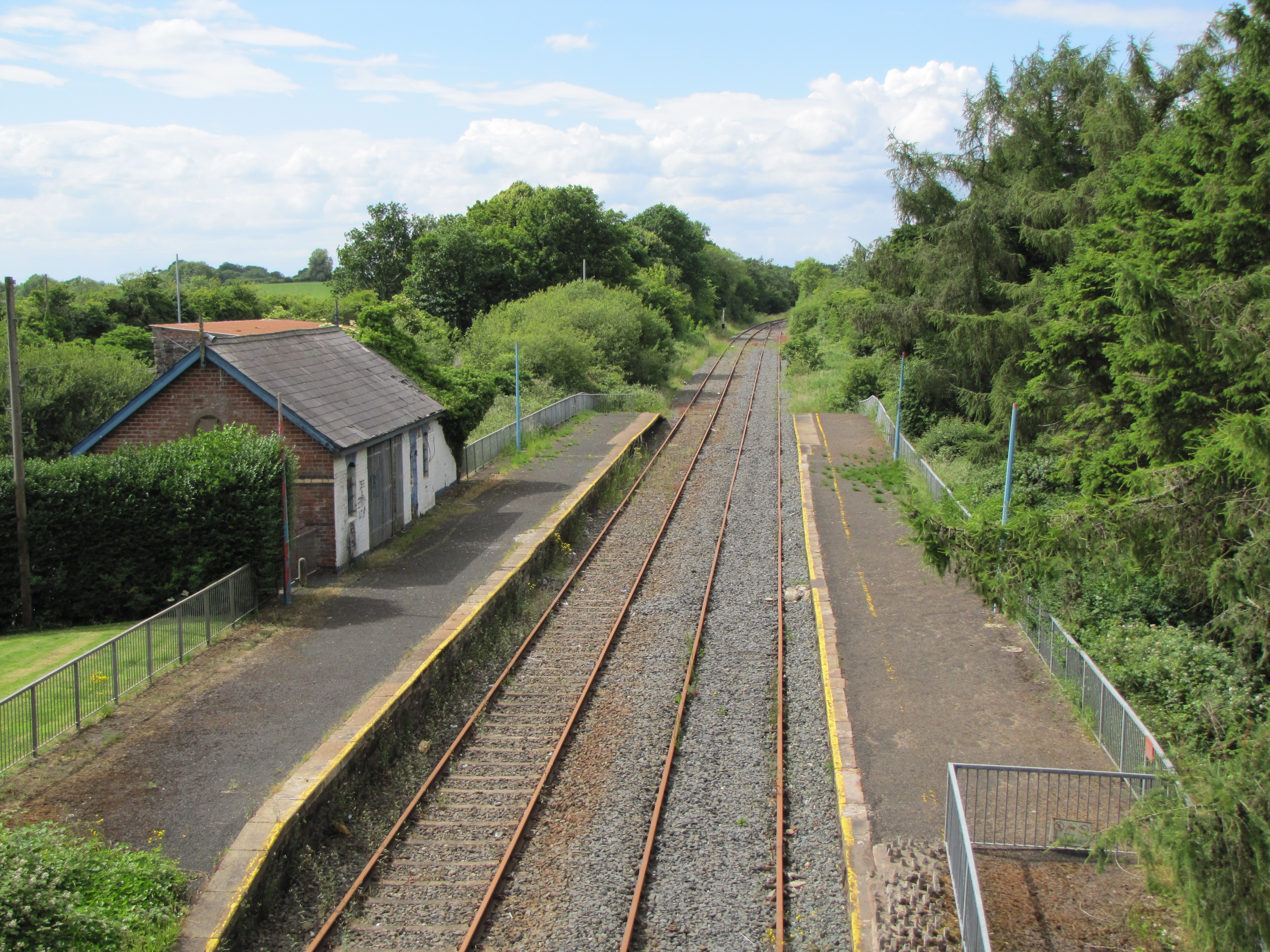
- Ballinderry railway station

General information
- Location: Crumlin, Antrim; Northern Ireland
- Platforms: 2

Other information
- Status: Disused

History
- Pre-grouping: Northern Ireland Railways

Key dates
- 13 November 1871: Station opened
- 1960 to 1974: Closed to passengers
- June 2003: Station closed
Location

Ballinderry railway station served Upper Ballinderry in County Antrim, Northern Ireland. It is currently closed to passengers.

The station was built for the Dublin and Antrim Junction Railway and opened on 13 November 1871. Translink withdrew passenger services from the line when it reopened the more direct Belfast Lanyon Place (Known as Belfast Central at the time) – Antrim route via Bleach Green. Translink stated that it was unable to maintain two routes to Antrim and after operating a skeleton service on the route announced that it would be mothballed.

Recently Northern Ireland Railways removed the passing loop here and it also removed the one at Crumlin to make the line a long siding. In 2023, Translink commissioned a study into reopening the line and the stations on it, including Ballinderry.

Preceding station	NI Railways	Following station
Meetinghouse Halt	Northern Ireland Railways; Lisburn – Antrim (disused)	Legatiriff Halt
