= Banbridge, Lisburn and Belfast Junction Railway =

Railway in Ireland

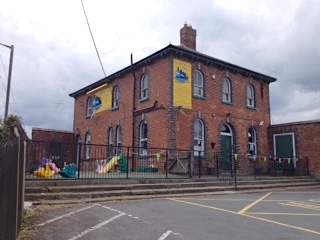
- The former Dromore Railway Station
- Industry: Rail transport
- Founded: 1863
- Defunct: 1956
- Fate: Closed
- Parent: Great Northern Railway Board

The Banbridge, Lisburn and Belfast Junction Railway was an Irish gauge (1,600 mm (5 ft 3 in)) railway in Ireland linking Belfast with Banbridge, County Down. It was built in the 19th century. The line between Knockmore and Banbridge was closed in 1956.

== History ==
Banbridge, Lisburn and Belfast Railway Act 1858
- Act of Parliament
- Parliament of the United Kingdom
- Long title: An Act for making a Railway from Banbridge to Lisburn, to be called "The Banbridge, Lisburn, and Belfast Railway;" and for other Purposes.
- Citation: 21 & 22 Vict. c. xlvi

Dates
- Royal assent: 14 June 1858

Banbridge, Lisburn and Belfast Railway (Leasing) Act 1862
- Act of Parliament
- Parliament of the United Kingdom
- Long title: An Act to provide for the leasing of the Banbridge, Lisburn, and Belfast Railway to the Ulster Railway Company.
- Citation: 25 & 26 Vict. c. cviii

Dates
- Royal assent: 30 June 1862

Text of statute as originally enacted

Banbridge, Lisburn and Belfast and Ulster Railway Act 1860
- Act of Parliament
- Parliament of the United Kingdom
- Long title: An Act to enable the Banbridge, Lisburn, and Belfast Railway Company to make Deviations in their authorized Railways; and to enable the Ulster Railway Company to acquire and hold Shares in the Undertaking of the Banbridge, Lisburn, and Belfast Railway Company; and for other Purposes.
- Citation: 23 & 24 Vict. c. vi

Dates
- Royal assent: 3 April 1860

Text of statute as originally enacted

The Banbridge, Lisburn and Belfast Junction Railway (BLB) through Dromore was authorised by the Banbridge, Lisburn and Belfast Railway Act 1858 (21 & 22 Vict. c. xlvi), and opened in 1863. Its line was a branch that joined the Ulster Railway main line at Knockmore Junction, giving Dromore a direct link to Lisburn and Belfast Great Victoria Street. In 1876 the Ulster Railway became part of the new Great Northern Railway, which took over the BLB company by the Great Northern Railway (Ireland) Transfer Act 1877 (40 & 41 Vict. c. lxxi). In 1953 the railway was nationalised as the GNR Board, which closed the line through Dromore on 29 April 1956.

The main engineering feature on the line was Dromore Viaduct.

== Gallery ==
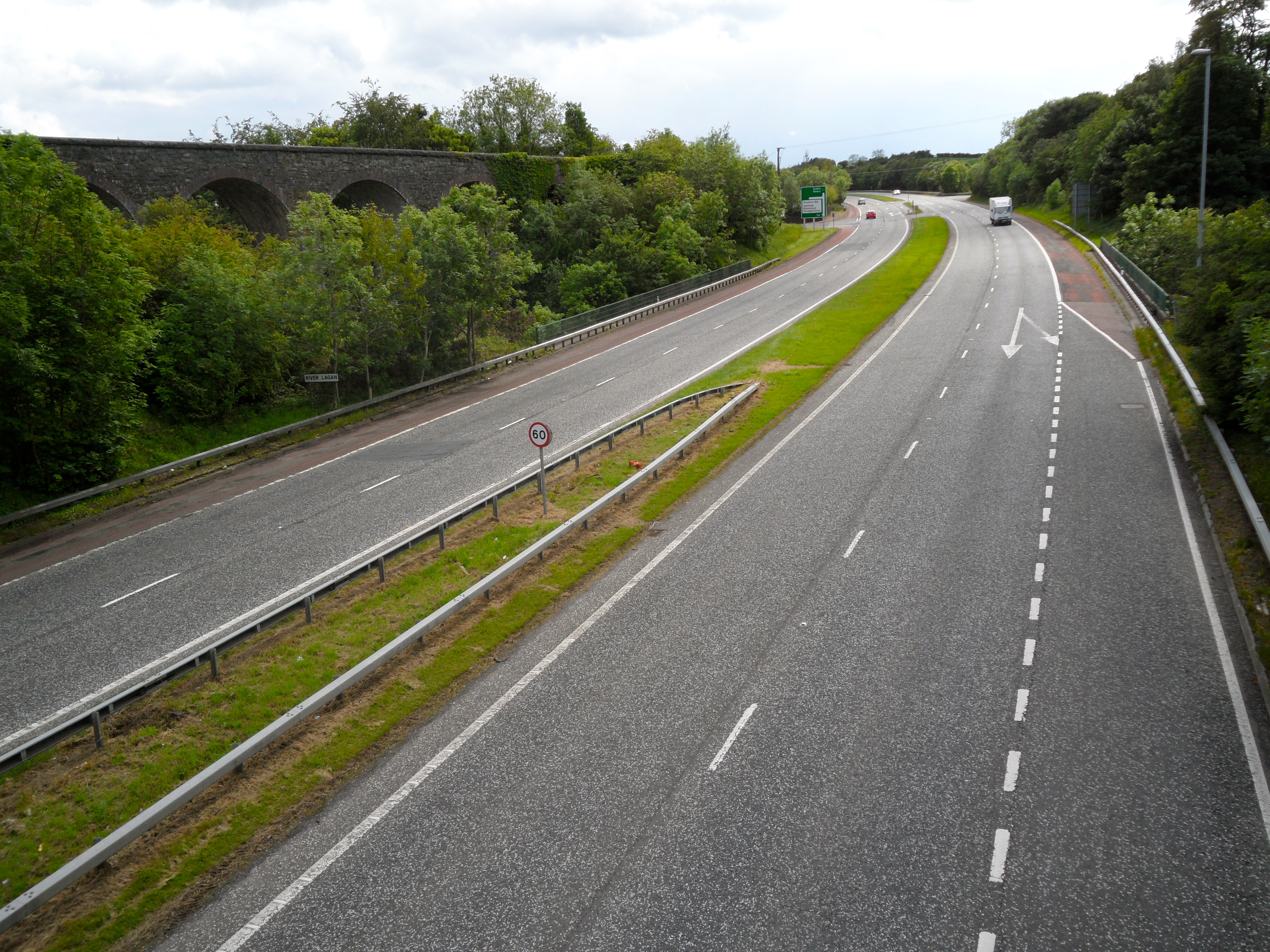
Dromore Bypass June 2011. The disused viaduct of the BLB can be seen on the left

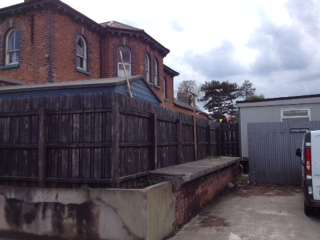
The remnants of the platform at Dromore Station on the Banbridge, Lisburn and Belfast Junction Railway
