= Aldergrove, County Antrim =

Hamlet in County Antrim, Northern Ireland

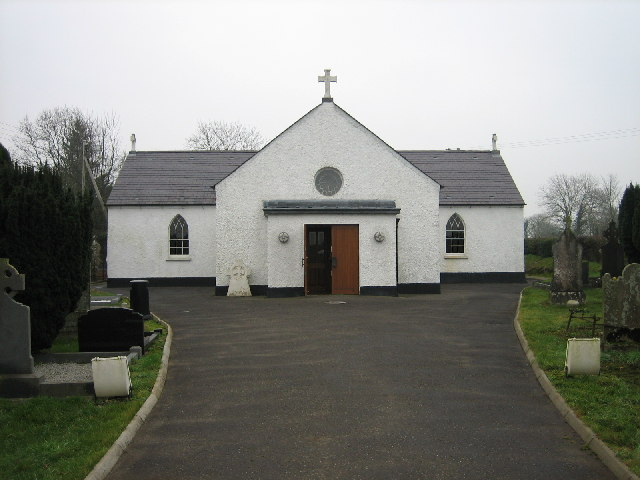
St James' Church

Aldergrove is a hamlet and townland sub-division in County Antrim, Northern Ireland. It is within the townland of Seacash and parish of Killead – 6 miles (9.7 km) south of Antrim and 18 miles (29 km) west of Belfast. It is part of the Borough of Antrim and Newtownabbey.

The name Aldergrove is more commonly used to describe the major airfield to the north east of the hamlet. Two long runways serve both the civil Belfast International Airport and the British Army's Aldergrove Flying Station (formerly the RAF base RAF Aldergrove).

== Climate ==
Climate data for Belfast International Airport WMO ID: 03917; coordinates 54°39′50″N 6°13′30″W; elevation: 63 m (207 ft); 1991–2020 normals, extremes 1930–present
Month	Jan	Feb	Mar	Apr	May	Jun	Jul	Aug	Sep	Oct	Nov	Dec	Year
Record high °C (°F)	14.5 (58.1)	15.6 (60.1)	20.2 (68.4)	21.8 (71.2)	26.1 (79.0)	29.5 (85.1)	30.8 (87.4)	28.0 (82.4)	27.1 (80.8)	21.8 (71.2)	17.1 (62.8)	15.0 (59.0)	30.8 (87.4)
Mean daily maximum °C (°F)	7.3 (45.1)	7.9 (46.2)	9.7 (49.5)	12.3 (54.1)	15.2 (59.4)	17.6 (63.7)	19.1 (66.4)	18.7 (65.7)	16.6 (61.9)	13.1 (55.6)	9.8 (49.6)	7.6 (45.7)	12.9 (55.2)
Daily mean °C (°F)	4.7 (40.5)	4.9 (40.8)	6.3 (43.3)	8.5 (47.3)	11.2 (52.2)	13.8 (56.8)	15.4 (59.7)	15.2 (59.4)	13.2 (55.8)	10.2 (50.4)	7.1 (44.8)	5.0 (41.0)	9.6 (49.3)
Mean daily minimum °C (°F)	2.1 (35.8)	2.0 (35.6)	3.0 (37.4)	4.7 (40.5)	7.1 (44.8)	9.9 (49.8)	11.8 (53.2)	11.7 (53.1)	9.9 (49.8)	7.2 (45.0)	4.4 (39.9)	2.4 (36.3)	6.4 (43.5)
Record low °C (°F)	−12.8 (9.0)	−11.7 (10.9)	−12.2 (10.0)	−5.1 (22.8)	−3.3 (26.1)	−1.2 (29.8)	2.2 (36.0)	1.1 (34.0)	−2.2 (28.0)	−4.4 (24.1)	−8.6 (16.5)	−14.9 (5.2)	−14.9 (5.2)
Average precipitation mm (inches)	77.0 (3.03)	63.3 (2.49)	60.6 (2.39)	55.6 (2.19)	55.9 (2.20)	68.0 (2.68)	78.8 (3.10)	84.5 (3.33)	69.2 (2.72)	88.0 (3.46)	87.7 (3.45)	83.5 (3.29)	872.0 (34.33)
Average precipitation days (≥ 1.0 mm)	14.7	13.2	13.0	12.0	11.6	11.9	14.1	14.2	12.1	14.0	15.5	15.2	161.3
Average snowy days	5	5	4	1	0	0	0	0	0	0	1	3	19
Average relative humidity (%)	89	87	88	89	90	90	90	92	92	91	90	89	91
Mean monthly sunshine hours	48.7	72.1	108.4	157.8	197.9	167.6	152.0	146.4	121.5	91.2	61.3	47.1	1,372
Source 1: Met Office NOAA (relative humidity and snow days 1961–-1990)
Source 2: KNMI Starlings Roost Weather

== See also ==
- List of villages in Northern Ireland
- List of places in County Antrim
