= Belfast International Airport =

Airport in Northern Ireland

Belfast International Airport Aldergrove Airport

- IATA: BFS; ICAO: EGAA

Summary
- Airport type: Public
- Owner/Operator: Vinci Airports
- Serves: Belfast
- Location: Aldergrove, County Antrim, Northern Ireland
- Focus city for: easyJet; Jet2.com; Ryanair; TUI Airways
- Elevation AMSL: 268 ft (82 m)
- Coordinates: 54°39′27″N 006°12′57″W
- Website: www.belfastairport.com

Map
- Location in Northern Ireland EGAA (island of Ireland)

Runways
Direction	Length		Surface
Direction	m	ft	Surface
07/25	2,780	9,121	Asphalt
17/35	1,891	6,204	Asphalt

Statistics (2024)
- Passengers: 6,733,949
- Passenger change 2023-24: ▲13.0%
- Aircraft Movements: 57,761
- Movements change 2022-23: ▲50.1%
- Sources: UK AIP at NATS; Statistics from the UK Civil Aviation Authority

Belfast International Airport (IATA: BFS, ICAO: EGAA) is an international airport 11.5 NM (21.3 km; 13.2 mi) northwest of Belfast in Northern Ireland, and is the main airport for the city of Belfast. Until 1983, it was known as Aldergrove Airport, after the nearby village of Aldergrove, County Antrim. In 2024, over 6.7 million passengers travelled through the airport, a 13.0% increase compared with 2023, and the highest number in the airport's history. The majority of flights from Belfast International are operated by easyJet, Northern Ireland's biggest airline. It features flights to some European metropolitan and several leisure destinations.

Belfast International has a CAA Public Use Aerodrome Licence that allows flights for the public transport of passengers or for flying instruction. The airfield was previously shared with the Royal Air Force base RAF Aldergrove, which closed in 2008. The base is now known as Joint Helicopter Command Flying Station, Aldergrove, and both runways are now owned by the airport. The airport is owned and operated by Vinci Airports.

== History ==
=== 1917–1945 ===
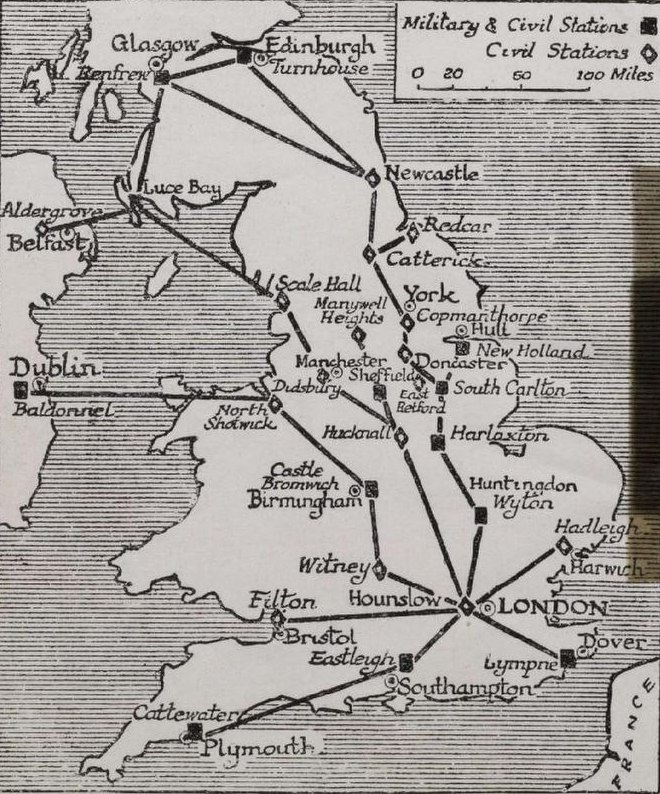
"Map of Air Routes and Landing Places in Great Britain, as temporarily arranged by the Air Ministry for civilian flying", published in 1919, showing Aldergrove as a "civil station".

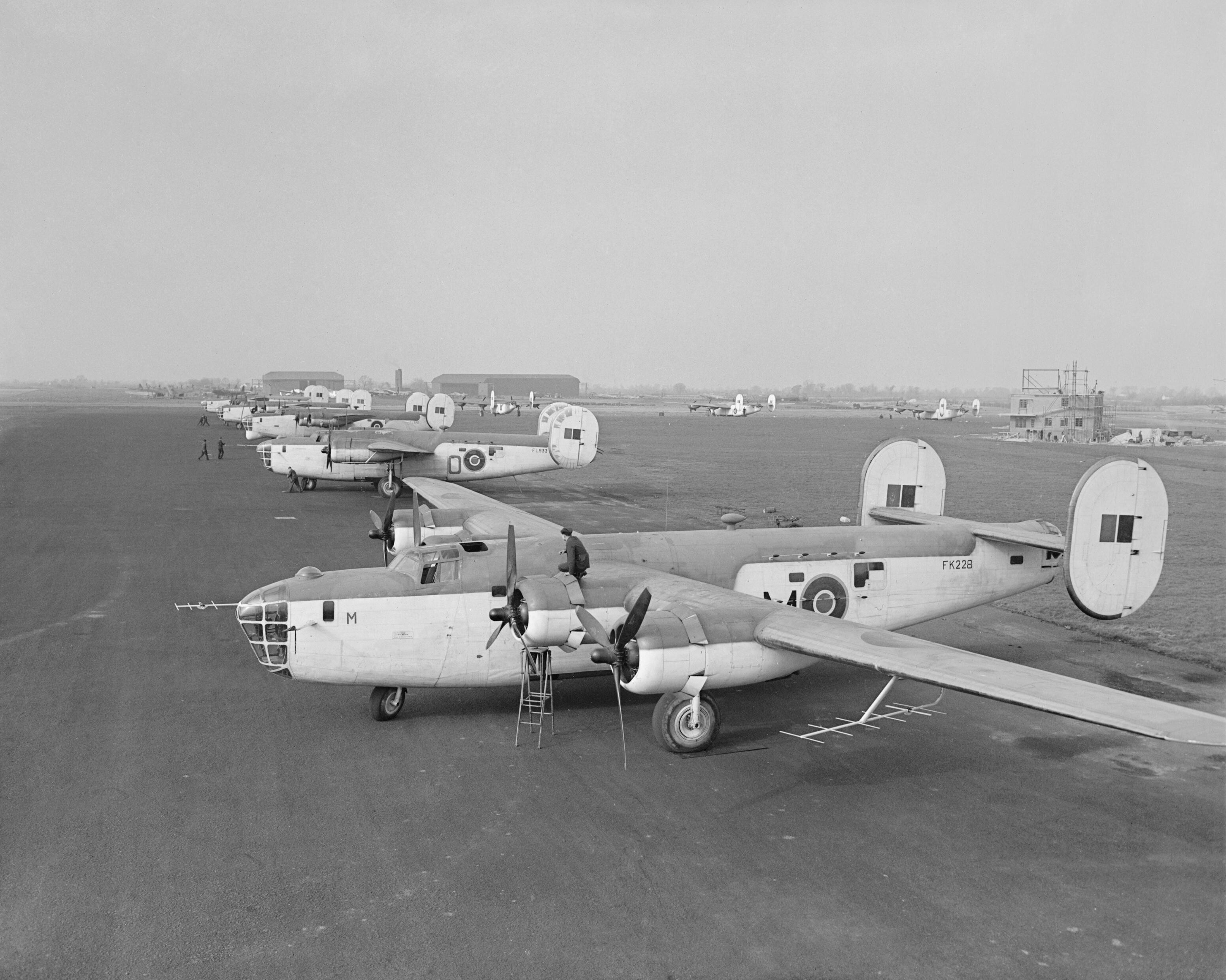
Royal Air Force B-24 Liberators in Belfast, c.1943

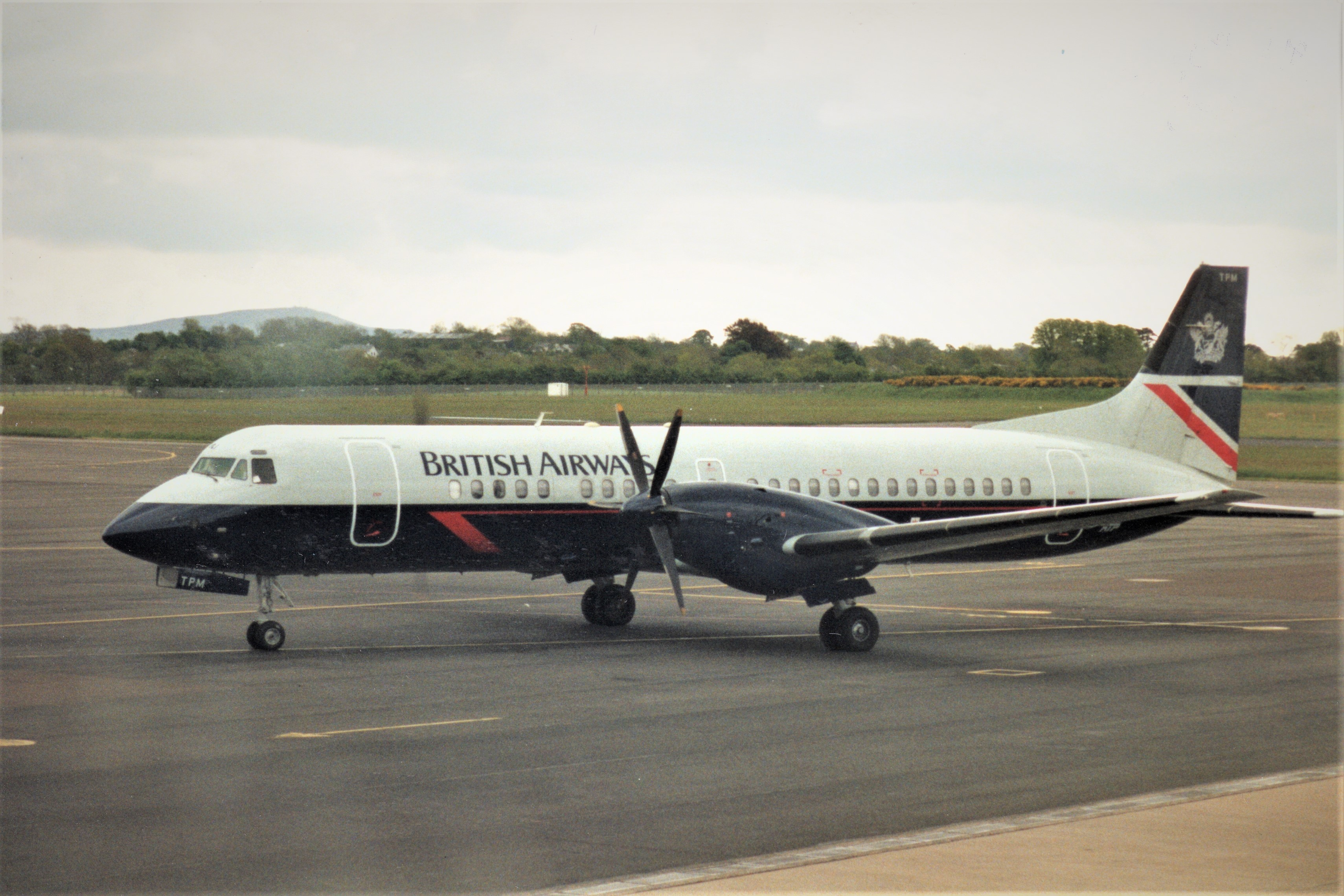
British Airways BAe ATP in Belfast, 1994

The airport lies within the parish of Killead, between the small villages of Killead (to the east) and Aldergrove (to the west). The site for the airport was established in 1917, when it was selected to be a Royal Flying Corps (RFC) training establishment during the First World War. The airport remained open at the end of the war for RAF activity.

Civil traffic began in 1922, when flights were conducted to fly newspapers from Chester. The first scheduled passenger service was started in 1933 by the Scottish airline Midland & Scottish Air Ferries. This service consisted of two daily flights each way between Aldergrove and Renfrew Airport, Glasgow. This was subsequently augmented by a twice-daily, return service to Croydon, at that time London's airport, with stops at the Isle of Man, Liverpool and Birmingham.

During the Second World War, Aldergrove remained an RAF station particularly for the Coastal Command. So that the airport could accommodate larger, long-range aircraft, a major works programme was undertaken to replace the four existing runways with two new long paved runways, thereby forming the basis of the layout that still exists at the airport today.

=== 1946–1970 ===
One of the outcomes of the wartime airfield construction programme was the building of Nutts Corner Airport, just 3 mi (4.8 km) from Aldergrove. On 1 December 1946, the new site replaced Belfast Harbour Airport (now George Best Belfast City Airport) as Northern Ireland's civil airport, as the Harbour Airport was considered unsuitable.

By the 1950s civil air traffic had outstripped the facilities at Nutts Corner and aircraft were being regularly diverted to Aldergrove because of adverse weather conditions. In July 1959 the decision was made to move civil flights to Aldergrove to take advantage of the large airfield and this took place in October 1963.

A new terminal and apron were built, with the necessary passenger facilities, and the complex was opened by Queen Elizabeth The Queen Mother on 28 October 1963. The first regular jet service to London–Gatwick started in 1966, and in 1968 Aer Lingus and BOAC introduced scheduled services to New York City via Shannon and Prestwick respectively.

=== 1971–1999 ===
In 1971, Northern Ireland Airports Limited was formed to operate and develop the airport and its facilities. A major programme of airfield upgrades was undertaken, resulting in improvements to runways, taxiways and the parking apron.

A new International Pier was built together with lounge facilities and car parks, while an additional apron was provided to separate the smaller general aviation aircraft from large commercial jets. In the meantime, British Airways launched the first Belfast to London–Heathrow shuttle service and the first Boeing 747 operated from the airport on a charter service to Toronto via Shannon. The first scheduled service to a European city was started by NLM Cityhopper (now KLM Cityhopper) flying to Amsterdam.

In 1983 the airport, renamed Belfast International, was regularly accommodating the largest civil aircraft in service and with the installation of new technology was capable of all-weather operations. In 1985, passenger numbers reached 1.5 million and British Midland International (BMI) went into competition with British Airways on the London–Heathrow service. Further developments to the terminal occurred throughout the late 1980s and early 1990s, extending the terminal's landside and airside area. A new Executive Aviation Terminal was also opened in 1987 and the new cargo centre opened in 1991.

The airport was privatised in 1994. TBI became the new owner of the airport on 13 August 1996, by which time annual passenger numbers had reached 2.5 million.

In 1998, easyJet started operations from the airport with flights to London–Luton. Since then the airline has established a large base at Belfast International and a further twelve domestic routes and twenty-three direct European scheduled routes have been added to the network, making the airline the largest user of the airport.

=== Development since 2000 ===
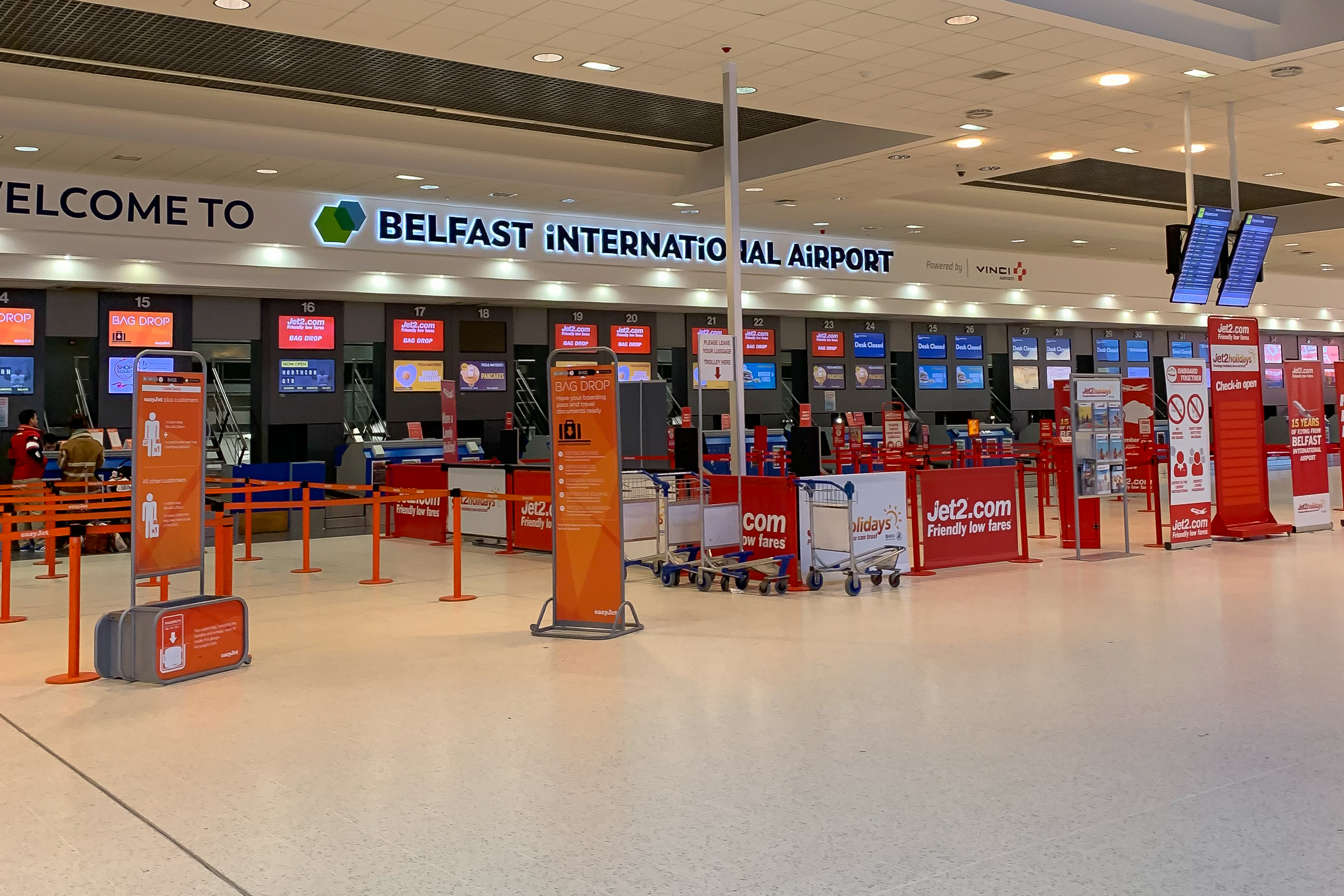
Main check-in hall

In 2005, Continental Airlines launched the first ever nonstop scheduled service to Newark; this continued to operate under the United Airlines brand until the route's termination in January 2017.

In July 2013, it was confirmed that abertis would sell Belfast International Airport, Stockholm Skavsta Airport and Orlando Sanford International Airport to ADC & HAS based in the United States. In February 2015 the airport re-opened the viewing gallery that had been closed for 10 years, which provides a view of the apron and the runways that serve the airport. It also includes live ATC, arrival and departure boards, and a live flight radar screen. However, this was closed again in October 2019.

In 2014, news emerged of talks between the airport and Turkish Airlines. This could have led to a service linking Belfast into the worldwide Turkish route network, but did not materialise.

From 2015, Virgin Atlantic offered weekly services to Orlando using Boeing 747-400 aircraft with occasional services provided by the airline's Airbus A330 fleet. These flights served tourist traffic during the summer months (typically June - August). The service was suspended with the onset of the COVID-19 pandemic, and to date has not returned.

Ryanair opened a base at the airport in 2016, initially operating flights to nine destinations. The airline said it would carry 1.1 million passengers a year out of the airport. In 2017 and 2018, Norwegian Air Shuttle operated long-haul services to Newburgh and Providence.

In April 2018, Vinci Airports acquired an airport portfolio held by Airports Worldwide (previously named ADC & HAS), with the transaction expected to close later that year, Vinci Airports became the new owner of Belfast International Airport.

In 2018, there were further suggestions of an international carrier providing access to a global network. This time Qatar Airways was mooted, but again, any such proposal did not come to fruition.

Thomas Cook Airlines had a seasonal base at the airport, until their collapse in September 2019. They operated routes to Europe and some other destinations, operated by an Airbus A321 aircraft. Every July, they operated long-haul flights from Belfast to Cancún and Orlando, operated by their Airbus A330 aircraft. In August 2021, Ryanair announced they would be ending its operations at both of Belfast's airports. In July 2022, Ryanair announced that they will be returning to Belfast International Airport, in addition to opening a base.

In summer 2023, work began on a significant terminal expansion, to accommodate new security scanning equipment. This is to be operational by summer 2024.

In February 2025, a new duty free under the Aelia Duty Free brand was announced, being operated by Lagardère Travel Retail, concessions in the duty free include Discover Belfast, Jo Malone London, MINISO and Charlotte Tilbury Beauty. The duty free opened on 3 April 2025, replacing a previous duty free in the airport.

In May 2025, First Minister Michelle O'Neill and deputy First Minister Emma Little-Pengelly officially opened the first phase of a £100 million investment programme into the airport by its owners. This included a new security hall, which upgrades mean that passengers no longer have to remove liquids or electronics from their hand luggage.

== Airlines and destinations ==
=== Passenger ===
The following airlines operate regular scheduled flights to and from Belfast–International:

Airlines	Destinations
easyJet	Aberdeen (begins 4 January 2027), Alicante, Amsterdam, Birmingham, Bristol, Budapest (begins 17 November 2026), Edinburgh, Enfidha, Faro, Fuerteventura, Glasgow, Hurghada, Jersey, Leeds/Bradford (ends 5 January 2027), Liverpool, London–Gatwick, London–Luton, London–Stansted, Málaga, Manchester, Marrakesh, Newcastle upon Tyne, Paris–Charles de Gaulle (ends 5 January 2027), Prague, Rome–Fiumicino, Sharm El Sheikh, Southampton, Tenerife–South; Seasonal: Antalya, Barcelona, Bordeaux, Corfu, Dalaman, Geneva, Gran Canaria, Ibiza, Kraków, Lanzarote, Larnaca, London–Southend, Lyon, Menorca, Nice, Reus, Rhodes, Rovaniemi
Jet2.com	Alicante, Antalya, Fuerteventura, Gran Canaria, Lanzarote, Málaga, Tenerife–South; Seasonal: Dalaman, Dubrovnik, Faro, Heraklion, Ibiza, Kraków, Malta, Menorca, Palma de Mallorca, Paphos, Reus, Reykjavik–Keflavik, Rhodes, Salzburg, Verona, Vienna, Zakynthos; Seasonal charter: Plovdiv
Ryanair	Alicante, East Midlands, Edinburgh, Faro, Kraków, Lanzarote, London–Stansted, Málaga, Manchester; Seasonal: Girona, Malta, Milan Bergamo, Palma de Mallorca, Paris Beauvais, Porto, Turin
TUI Airways	Seasonal: Cancún, Corfu, Dalaman, Kos, Lanzarote, Larnaca, Melbourne/Orlando, Palma de Mallorca, Punta Cana, Reus, Salzburg, Tenerife–South, Turin

=== Cargo ===
Airlines	Destinations
DHL Aviation	East Midlands
Maersk Air Cargo	East Midlands

== General aviation ==
Woodgate Aviation has a base at the airport, featuring a private jet terminal, with facilities to accommodate small aircraft. Their 33,000 sq ft (3,100 m^{2}) hangar was constructed in 2015, and at the time of completion, access to hangar floor was through Europe's largest hydraulic door.

Global Trek Aviation, opened as the third FBO on the airfield, during 2015. This was part of the airport's commercial drive to develop the non-scheduled, military and GA development at the airport. This had notable success with an increase in growth across these movement types at Belfast International Airport.

== Traffic and statistics ==
=== Traffic figures ===
Belfast International handled over 6.7 million passengers in 2024. The airport is the busiest in Northern Ireland and the 10th-busiest airport in the UK by passenger traffic in 2024.

Annual passenger numbers
Year	Passengers	Aircraft movements	Freight (tonnes)
1997	2,476,834	35,070	24,838
1998	2,671,848	38,976	25,275
1999	3,035,907	44,817	25,773
2000	3,147,670	41,256	30,599
2001	3,618,671	45,706	32,130
2002	3,576,785	38,453	29,474
2003	3,976,703	39,894	29,620
2004	4,407,413	43,373	32,148
2005	4,824,271	47,695	37,878
2006	5,038,692	48,412	38,417
2007	5,272,664	51,085	38,429
2008	5,262,354	55,000	36,115
2009	4,546,475	44,796	29,804
2010	4,016,170	40,324	29,716
2011	4,103,620	57,460	31,062
2012	4,313,685	58,011	29,095
2013	4,023,336	54,003	29,288
2014	4,033,954	50,973	30,073
2015	4,391,307	52,246	30,389
2016	5,147,546	55,155	7,597
2017	5,836,552	58,152	12,308
2018	6,269,025	60,541	27,672
2019	6,278,563	47,230	25,095
2020	1,747,086	19,416	27,946
2021	2,328,276	24,008	28,225
2022	4,818,214	38,489	23,526
2023	5,957,055	57,761	22,280
2024	6,733,949	60,480	24,724

=== Busiest routes ===
Busiest routes to and from Belfast International (2025)
Rank	Airport	Total passengers	Change 2024 / 25
1	London–Stansted	566,764	▼0.6%
2	Manchester	550,729	▲1.3%
3	Edinburgh	517,752	▼0.3%
4	London–Gatwick	388,360	▼12.7%
5	Liverpool	361,316	▼9.4%
6	Birmingham	345,892	▼3.9%
7	London–Luton	323,689	▼7.2%
8	Glasgow	308,571	▼0.4%
9	Alicante	284,215	▲11.0%
10	Málaga	261,003	▲3.0%

== Ground transport ==
=== Road ===
Travellers by car can reach the airport from Belfast via the M2 motorway. The airport operates four car parks, three on-site car parks and one off-site car park. The on-site short-stay and main car parks are situated within easy walking distance of the terminal building, and an on-demand courtesy bus operates to and from the on-site long-stay car park. The off-site short- or long-stay car park, called 'Park and Fly', is located just before the main entrance to the airport, and is also serviced by a courtesy bus.

=== Bus ===
Translink operates an express bus service 300 to the airport from its Belfast Grand Central. This runs 24 hours a day, every 15 minutes at peak times. Translink also offers bus connections to Antrim railway station. The airport can be reached from Derry and the northwest by Aircoach The 109A bus service operates from Lisburn bus centre in Lisburn City Centre.

=== Train ===
The nearest railway station is Antrim railway station, 10 km (6.2 mi) from the airport in Antrim. There are connections to Belfast, Lisburn and Derry.

A new station serving the airport could be constructed on the mothballed Lisburn-Antrim railway line, as set out in the airport master plan. This line remains in serviceable condition and passes close to the airport terminal. It has also been listed in a public review of the future of Northern Ireland railways.

== Accidents and incidents ==
- On 24 March 1996, Vickers Viscount G-OPFE of British World Airlines was damaged beyond economic repair when it made a wheels-up landing.
