= List of Northern Ireland–related topics =

This is a list of articles related to Northern Ireland. For a list of topics related to the island of Ireland, see the list of Ireland-related topics; for a list of topics related to the United Kingdom, see the Outline of the United Kingdom.

This is a list of Northern Ireland–related topics. Northern Ireland is a part of the United Kingdom in the north-east of the island of Ireland. The following list of topics relating to Northern Ireland are grouped alphabetically.

== Architecture ==
- Abbeys and priories in Northern Ireland
- Historic houses in Northern Ireland
- Laganside Corporation
- List of castles in Northern Ireland
- List of National Trust properties in Northern Ireland
- Market Houses in Northern Ireland
- Obel Tower
- Victoria Square, Belfast
- Windsor House

== Communications ==
- .uk
- BT Group
- IE Domain Registry
- Nominet UK

== Culture ==
- Apprentice Boys of Derry
- Celt
- Celtic calendar
- Gaels
- Irish art
  - List of Northern Irish artists
  - The Ormeau Baths Gallery
  - The Ulster Museum
- Irish dance
- Irish diaspora
- Irish mythology
  - Cúchulainn
  - Ulster Cycle
- Irish people
- Irish poetry
- Irish theatre
  - List of Irish dramatists
- Irish traditional music
- Irish Traveller
- List of Irish ballads
  - Billy Boys
  - The Boyne Water
  - Come Out Ye Black and Tans
  - Danny Boy
  - Four Green Fields
  - Ireland's Call
  - Lillibullero
  - Londonderry Air
  - The Men Behind the Wire
  - The Mountains of Mourne
  - The Patriot Game
  - There Were Roses
  - The Town I Loved So Well
  - The Sash
  - Star of the County Down
- List of Irish people
- List of Northern Irish people
- Modern Celts
- National symbols
  - Harp
  - Red Hand of Ulster
  - Shamrock
- Northern Irish murals
- The Orange Order
- Orange walk
- Pejoratives
  - Fenian
  - Millie
  - MOPE
  - Paddy
  - Spide
  - Taig
  - West Brit
  - Hun
  - Orangie
  - Prod
- Prostitution
- Royal Black Preceptory
- Saint Patrick's Day

== Economy ==
- The "Big Four"
  - Bank of Ireland
  - First Trust Bank
  - Northern Bank
  - Ulster Bank
- British Civil Service
- DeLorean Motor Company
- Economic history of Ireland
- Economy of Northern Ireland
- Harland and Wolff
- Irish linen
- Northern Ireland Electricity
- Northern Irish banknotes
- Short Brothers
- Tayto (Northern Ireland)

== Education ==
- Council for the Curriculum, Examinations and Assessment
- Education in Northern Ireland
- Department of Education
- Department for Employment and Learning
- List of Irish learned societies
- List of primary schools in Northern Ireland
- List of secondary schools in Northern Ireland
- List of grammar schools in Northern Ireland
- List of integrated schools in Northern Ireland
- List of universities in Northern Ireland
- Belfast Education and Library Board
- North Eastern Education and Library Board
- South Eastern Education and Library Board
- Southern Education and Library Board
- Western Education and Library Board
- Integrated Education
- Union of Students in Ireland

== Foods ==
- Barmbrack
- Irish breakfast
- Irish cuisine
- Irish stew
- Irish whiskey
- Potato bread
- Soda bread
- Ulster fry
- Veda bread

== History ==
- Anglo-Irish
  - Anglo-Irish War (1919)
  - Anglo-Irish Treaty (1921)
  - Anglo-Irish Agreement (1985)
- Annals of Ulster
- Battle of the Boyne
- Belfast blitz
- Black and Tans
- Catholic Emancipation
- Coat of arms of Northern Ireland
- Erin
- Hibernia
- History of Belfast
- History of Ireland
- History of Northern Ireland
- Irish states since 1171
  - Lordship of Ireland (1171–1541)
  - Kingdom of Ireland (1541–1800)
    - Confederate Ireland (1641–1649)
  - United Kingdom of Great Britain and Ireland (1801–1922)
    - Northern Ireland (1921–present)
    - Southern Ireland (1921–22)
  - Irish Republic (1919–22)
  - Irish Free State (1922–37)
  - Ireland/Éire (1937–present), or more generally called Republic of Ireland (1949–present)
- Operation Green
- Plan W
- Plantation of Ulster
- Scotia
- Ulaid

== Ideologies ==
- Nationalists
  - Republicanism
    - Irish National Liberation Army
    - Irish Republican Army
      - Official IRA
      - Provisional IRA
        - Continuity IRA
        - Real IRA
    - Irish Republican Brotherhood
- Unionists
  - Loyalist
    - Red Hand Commandos
    - Ulster Defence Association (Ulster Freedom Fighters)
      - Ulster Young Militants
    - Ulster Volunteer Force
      - Loyalist Volunteer Force

== Language ==
- Celtic languages
- Proto-Celtic language
- Insular Celtic languages
- Goidelic languages
- Gaelic
  - Ogham
  - Primitive Irish language
  - Old Irish language
  - Middle Irish language
  - Irish language
    - Ulster Irish
    - Irish initial mutations
    - Irish language in Northern Ireland
    - Irish morphology
    - Irish name
    - Irish nominals
    - Irish orthography
    - Irish phonology
    - Irish surnames
    - Irish syntax
    - Irish verbs
    - Irish words used in the English language
    - Modern literature in Irish
    - Place names in Irish
    - Words of Irish origin
- Hiberno-English
- Mid Ulster English
- Scots language
  - Ulster Scots dialects
- Law
  - The Administration of Justice (Language) Act (Ireland) 1737
  - European Charter for Regional or Minority Languages
- Public bodies
  - Foras na Gaeilge
  - The North/South Language Body
  - Ulster-Scots Agency

== Law ==
- Articles 2 and 3 of the Constitution of Ireland
- Belfast Agreement ("Good Friday Agreement")
- Government of Ireland Act 1920
- List of High Court Judges of Northern Ireland
- Northern Ireland Act 1998
- Northern Ireland law
- Police Service of Northern Ireland (formerly the Royal Ulster Constabulary)

== Local government ==
- Local government in Northern Ireland
- Waste management
  - ARC21
  - NWRWMG
  - SWaMP

== Media ==
- Newspapers
  - The Belfast Telegraph
  - The Irish News
  - List of newspapers in Ireland
  - List of newspapers in the United Kingdom
  - The News Letter
  - Vacuum newspaper
  - Sunday Life
- Radio
  - BBC Radio Foyle
  - BBC Radio Ulster
  - Bangor FM
  - Belfast CityBeat
  - Castle FM
  - Cool FM
  - Downtown Radio
  - Raidió Fáilte
- Television
  - BBC Northern Ireland
  - BBC Two Northern Ireland
  - List of Irish television channels
  - UTV

== Music ==
- Artists
  - Iain Archer
  - Derek Bell
  - Phil Coulter
  - Nadine Coyle
  - Peter Cunnah
  - Dana
  - The Divine Comedy
  - James Galway
  - David Holmes
  - Brian Kennedy
  - Tommy Makem
  - Henry McCullough
  - Gary Moore
  - Van Morrison
  - Snow Patrol
  - Stiff Little Fingers
  - The Undertones
  - Therapy?
- Ulster Orchestra

== Officials ==
- First Minister of Northern Ireland
- Historical
  - Chief Secretary for Ireland
  - High King of Ireland
  - King of Ireland
  - Lord Chancellor of Ireland
  - Lord Chief Justice of Ireland
  - Lord Lieutenant of Ireland
- Order of St. Patrick
- Prime Minister of Northern Ireland
- Secretary of State for Northern Ireland

== Places ==
- Areas of Outstanding Natural Beauty in Northern Ireland
- Bangor, County Down
- Belfast Lough
- Belfast Zoo
- Castles in Northern Ireland
- Cavehill
- Cities
  - Armagh
  - Belfast
  - Derry
  - Lisburn
  - Newry
- Corrymeela Community
- Counties of Ireland
- Derry-Londonderry name dispute
- Emain Macha (known in English as Navan Fort)
- Gardens in Northern Ireland
- Geography of Ireland
- Giant's Causeway
- Heritage railways in Northern Ireland
- Historic houses in Northern Ireland
- Islands of the North Atlantic
- Lighthouses in Ireland
- List of Irish loughs
- List of museums in Northern Ireland
- List of towns in Northern Ireland
- List of UNESCO World Heritage Sites in the United Kingdom
- Lough Neagh
- Market Houses in Northern Ireland
- Mourne Mountains
- National Nature Reserves in Northern Ireland
- Parliament Buildings
- Provinces of Ireland
- River Lagan
- Special Areas of Conservation in Northern Ireland
- Tourist destinations in Ireland
- Townlands

== Politics ==
- Celtic League
- Demographics and politics of Northern Ireland
- Flag of Northern Ireland
- List of political parties in Northern Ireland
- Segregation in Northern Ireland
  - Present
    - Alliance Party of Northern Ireland
    - Conservatives in Northern Ireland
    - Democratic Unionist Party
    - Green Party
    - Progressive Unionist Party
    - Sinn Féin
    - Social Democratic and Labour Party
    - Traditional Unionist Voice
    - Ulster Unionist Party
  - Former
    - Northern Ireland Labour Party
    - Northern Ireland Unionist Party
    - Northern Ireland Women's Coalition
    - Protestant Unionist Party
    - Republican Labour Party
    - UK Unionist Party
    - Ulster Democratic Party
    - Ulster Loyalist Democratic Party
    - Ulster Popular Unionist Party
    - Unionist Party of Northern Ireland
    - Vanguard Progressive Unionist Party
    - Volunteer Political Party
- North/South Ministerial Council
- Northern Ireland Assembly
  - 1st Northern Ireland Assembly
  - 2nd Northern Ireland Assembly
  - 3rd Northern Ireland Assembly
  - 4th Northern Ireland Assembly
  - 5th Northern Ireland Assembly
  - 6th Northern Ireland Assembly
  - 7th Northern Ireland Assembly
- Northern Ireland peace process
- Good Friday Agreement
- First Minister and Deputy First Minister of Northern Ireland
- Northern Ireland Executive
- Parliament of Northern Ireland
- Prime Minister of Northern Ireland
- Governor of Northern Ireland
- Northern Ireland (European Parliament constituency)

== Religion ==
- Abbeys and priories in Northern Ireland
- Antiphonary of Bangor
- Association of Baptist Churches in Ireland
- Church of Ireland
- Dioceses
  - Church of Ireland
  - Roman Catholic
- Free Presbyterian Church of Ulster
- Irish Catholic
- List of cathedrals in Ireland
- Methodist Church in Ireland
- Non-subscribing Presbyterian Church of Ireland
- Presbyterian Church in Ireland
  - Church House
  - General Assembly
  - Irish Presbyterians
  - Moderator
  - Union Theological College
- Primates
  - Primate of All Ireland
  - Primate of Ireland
- Reformed Presbyterian Church (denominational group)
- Roman Catholicism in Ireland
- Saint Malachy
  - Prophecy of the Popes
- Saint Patrick

== Science & technology ==
- Andor Technology
- InspecVision Ltd.
- Northbrook Technology

== Sport ==
- 2003 Special Olympics World Summer Games
- Gaelic Games
  - Gaelic Athletic Association
  - Ulster GAA
  - All-Ireland Senior Football Championship
  - All-Ireland Senior Hurling Championship
- Association Football
  - Irish Football Association
  - Irish Football League
  - National football team
- Rugby
  - Irish Rugby Football Union
  - Ireland national rugby union team
- Swim Ireland
- Tennis Ireland
- Basketball Ireland

== Transport ==
- Airports
  - Belfast International Airport
  - City of Derry Airport
  - George Best Belfast City Airport
- Common Travel Area
- Rail transport in Ireland
  - Armagh rail disaster
  - History of rail transport in Ireland
- Roads in Ireland
- Translink
  - Metro (formerly Citybus)
  - Northern Ireland Railways
  - Ulsterbus
- Transport in Ireland

== The Troubles ==
- 1981 Irish Hunger Strike
  - Michael Devine
  - Kieran Doherty
  - Francis Hughes
  - Martin Hurson
  - Kevin Lynch
  - Raymond McCreesh
  - Joe McDonnell
  - Thomas McElwee
  - Patsy O'Hara
  - Bobby Sands
- Johnny Adair
- Anti H-Block
- Armalite and ballot box strategy
- Arms Crisis
- Battle of the Bogside
- Birmingham pub bombings
  - Birmingham Six
- Blanket protest
- Bloody Friday
- Bloody Sunday
  - Bloody Sunday Inquiry
- Border Campaign (IRA)
- Boundary Commission (Ireland)
- British Military Intelligence Systems in Northern Ireland
- Chronology of the Northern Ireland Troubles
- Claudy bombing
- Combined Loyalist Military Command
- Conflict Archive on the Internet
- Corporals killings
- Council of Ireland
- Crumlin Road Gaol
- Directory of the Northern Ireland Troubles
- Dirty protest
- Denis Donaldson
- Drumcree Church
- Emergency Powers Act (Northern Ireland) 1926
- Denis Faul
- Pat Finucane
- Five techniques
- Flags and Emblems (Display) Act (Northern Ireland) 1954
- Forced disappearance
- Martin Galvin
- Government of Ireland Act 1920
- Governor of Northern Ireland
- Guildford pub bombing
  - Guildford Four
- Historical Enquiries Team
- Holy Cross dispute
- Independent Commission on Policing for Northern Ireland
- Independent International Commission on Decommissioning
- Irish War of Independence
- Kingsmill massacre
- Lord Mountbatten
- Loyalist Association of Workers
- Maguire Seven
- Maze prison (also known as Long Kesh)
- Michael McKevitt
- Danny McNamee
- Milltown Cemetery attack
- George Mitchell
- Mitchell Principles
- Murder triangle
- NORAID
- Northern Campaign (IRA)
- Northern Ireland Civil Rights Association
- Northern Ireland Constitution Act 1973
- Northern Ireland Constitutional Convention
- Northern Ireland Forum
- Northern Ireland peace process
- Northern Ireland referendum, 1973
- Northern Ireland referendum, 1998
- Official Sinn Féin
- Omagh bombing
- Operation Demetrius (also known as Internment)
- Operation Motorman
- Peace lines
- People's Democracy (Ireland)
- Plan Kathleen
- Provisional IRA campaign 1969–1997
- Provisional IRA South Armagh Brigade
- Remembrance Day Bombing
- Repartition of Ireland
- Saor Uladh
- Sean O'Callaghan
- Shoot-to-kill policy in Northern Ireland
- Stakeknife
  - Freddie Scappaticci
- Stevens Report
- Sunningdale Agreement
- Supergrass
- TUAS
- Tara
- The Troubles in Ulster (1920–1922)
- Thiepval Barracks
- Third Force
- Tout
- Ulster Clubs
- Ulster Defence Regiment
- Ulster Defence Volunteers
- Ulster Project
- Ulster Resistance
- Ulster Special Constabulary
- Ulster Unionist Labour Association
- Ulster Workers Council
- Ulster Workers' Council Strike
- Ulsterisation
- Unity
- Warrenpoint ambush
