= 107.2 FM =

FM radio frequency

This is a list of radio stations that broadcast on FM frequency 107.2 MHz:

== China ==
- CNR Music Radio in Lijiang
- Story Channel in Shanghai
- Shantou Traffic Radio in Shantou

== Finland ==
- Radio Sputnik (Kotka frequency)
- KISS Finland (Kruunupyy frequency)

== France ==
- Radio Nova (Limoges frequency)
- Rire et Chansons (Mâcon frequency)

== Greece ==
- BLUE SPACE 107.2 broadcast on 107.2 FM in Athens. With a flavor of nostalgia, it plays the biggest international Hits of the 80's & 90's.Its playlist is characterized by artists of various music genres, such as Italo Disco, New Wave, Disco, Funk, Pop, Hip Hop and World Music.

== India ==
- Gyan Bharathi
- Radio Nasha

== New Zealand ==
- Various low-power stations up to 1 watt

== Romania ==
- VIBE FM (Piatra-Neamţ frequency)
- Renegade Radio 107.2 FM

== South Africa ==
- Tuks FM

== United Kingdom ==
- Awaz FM
- Bangor FM
- Castle FM
- Capital South (Brighton frequency)
- KMFM Thanet
- Easy Radio South Coast (Winchester frequency)
- Greatest Hits Radio Peterborough, Stamford and Rutland (Manton frequency)
- Heart North and Mid Wales in Bangor
- Q Radio Mid-Ulster in Dungannon
- Greatest Hits Radio Bristol & The South West in Bristol
- Greatest Hits Radio Liverpool and the North West (Warrington frequency)
- Greatest Hits Radio Black Country & Shropshire (Kidderminster frequency)
