= Stuart Robinson (broadcaster) =

British radio presenter (born 1979)

- Born: 20 June 1979 (age 47); Antrim, Northern Ireland
- Occupation: Radio presenter
- Known for: The Cool Saturday Show host
- Children: 2

Stuart Robinson (born 20 June 1979) is a Northern Ireland broadcaster with Cool FM, Downtown Radio and Downtown Country. He previously launched and became the longest running presenter to date on rival station Belfast CityBeat from 1996 before his defection in 2010. Robinson is the Content Director of Downtown Radio, Cool FM and Downtown Country; this gives him control over the largest radio audience in Northern Ireland.

From early 2015 he took over as host of Cool FM's flagship weekend show The Cool Saturday Show, seeing him repaired with David McCammond AKA Deputy Dave. The programme was a ratings success becoming the most listened to weekend radio show in Northern Ireland with over 100,000 listeners every Saturday morning. Deputy Dave left the show in 2019 and was replaced with Miss Northern Ireland Katharine Walker.

The Cool Saturday Show continued to enjoy success with the new dynamic "Stuart and Kat" for the next two years.

In 2021, Kat moved to her own programme and Deputy Dave once again returned as Robinson’s on-air sidekick. The show has consistently remained the most listened to radio show at the weekend in Northern Ireland for over 6 years.

Between 2013 and 2014, Robinson hosted the weekday lunchtime programme on Downtown, stepping down when he took over as Programme Controller.

At Citybeat, he won gold and silver awards at the 2009 New York Festival Radio Awards and was also the only Irish radio presenter to be nominated for an Arqiva Award in both 2009 and 2008. He created the talent format Young Star Search and the introduction of popular sidekick characters "Work Experience Boy" on Citybeat and "Rodney" on Cool FM.

In April 2015 he presided over the launch of Downtown Country, Northern Ireland's first DAB only radio station. This became the most successful radio launch in Northern Ireland since 1990, debuting with over 80,000 listeners and since growing to over 100,000 weekly listeners. Combined, the three Bauer Media stations in Ireland reach almost 50% of the entire population.

== History ==
Robinson became Northern Ireland's youngest radio presenter when he first broadcast on BCR in the mid-1990s. He went on to present the last programme on BCR and then became a familiar name on Belfast Citybeat during the 90s and 2000s. In 1997 he became the station's Head of Music and in 2004 he took on the role of Deputy Programme Controller. In 2010 he defected to rivals Downtown Radio / Cool FM to take over as Deputy Programme Controller along with presenting programmes on both stations. In June 2014, he was announced as the new Programme Controller for Downtown Radio / Cool FM, with his role extending to include Downtown Country following its launch in April 2015.

== Background ==
Robinson launched his own local RSL stations including Castle FM in Carrickfergus and Bangor FM in County Down. In the late 90s he combined his Belfast CityBeat shows with fronting programmes for Radio 1521 in Craigavon (where he also hosted the last ever programme), Goldbeat in Cookstown, Touch FM and Mid FM (now Q radio).

== Personal ==
Robinson lives in South Belfast and has two children
