= Young Star Search =

Kids' talent radio competition in Northern Ireland

The Young Star Search is a kids' talent radio competition based in Northern Ireland and is the current holder of the New York Festival Gold Award for best global radio station promotion. It was also nominated two years running at the UK Arqiva Radio Awards. Most recently the competition aired on Belfast CityBeat from 2007 -2010 and invited applications from kids aged 8–16 from across Ireland and in 2010 'Young Adults' aged 17–25.

Young Star Search was developed by Northern Ireland radio presenter Stuart Robinson for Castle FM in 2002 based in Carrickfergus, the competition also ran on Bangor FM from 2004, before completely moving to Belfast CityBeat in 2007. Stuart Robinson hosted the show while judges included record producer Micky Modelle.

Due to Robinson's sudden defection in late 2010 from Belfast Citybeat to rivals Cool FM / Downtown Radio the contest was cancelled in 2011. It was unclear if, or when, the contest would return and on what station it would be broadcast. The show returned in 2014 and was broadcast on Downtown Radio and presented by Paul Orr who, like Robinson, used to be a presenter on Belfast Citybeat.

The competition held auditions in April of each year, preceded by weekly heats in different areas of Northern Ireland between May and July. The semi-final and final, featuring regional winners was staged in Belfast's main shopping centre, Castle Court in August.

Young Star Search, is the biggest talent search for young people in Northern Ireland and boosted over 1,000 entries.

== Young Star Christmas Tour ==
The Young Star Christmas Tour was a spinoff from Young Star Search which run in 2007 and 2008 on Belfast CityBeat, the tour seen the Young Star (junior) winner from that year headline a group of young singers to perform at Christmas events around Northern Ireland, including the Belfast City Council Christmas Light Switch On. (senior winner performs solo on tour)

In 2007, Rachael Stewart was joined by five other finalists, however in 2008, separate auditions were staged to find fellow band members form Rachel Pearson.

2007 Group members:

- Rachael Stewart
- Jordan Richmond
- John Gillen
- Deborah Morrison
- Zoe Skillen
- Rhian Gourley

(Song Performed - Happy Xmas War Is Over)

2008 Group members:

- Rachel Pearson
- Rhian Gourley
- Fay Cairnduff

(Song Performed - Rockin' Around The Christmas Tree)

== Host ==
Stuart Robinson has been the host of Young Star Search since 2002.

== Notable judges ==
YEARS JUDGED	JUDGE	BACKGROUND
2002–2005	Keith Semple	ITV's Popstars Group - One True Voice
2003–2004	Maurice Jay	U105 Programme Controller
2003–2008	Tina Calder	Sunday Life showbiz journalist
2004–2009	Robin Elliot	NVTV & Citybeat Radio Presenter
2007	Shaun Rogerson	The X Factor Contestant
2007–2008	Gerard McCarthy	Hollyoaks actor
2007	Dana	Eurovision Song Contest winner
2007	Bel's Boys	CITV
2008	Rachel Tucker	I'd Do Anything finalist
2008	Niamh Perry	I'd Do Anything Finalist
2008	Tabby Callaghan	X Factor Finalist
2008 - today	Mickey Modelle	Music producer / DJ
2008	Jessy	Singer
2008	Brian Kennedy	Singer
2009	Geraldine Hughes	Actress
2009	Emma Fitzpatrick	Sunday Life
2010 - today	John Kearns	MTV presenter
2010 - today	Amy Ryan	Belfast Telegraph

== Past winners ==
YEAR	LOCATION	JUNIOR WINNER	SENIOR WINNER	YOUNG ADULT WINNER
2002 (Summer)	Carrickfergus	Darcy McLean	Natalie Brown	
2002 (Christmas)	Carrickfergus	Darcy McLean	N/A	
2003 (Summer)	Carrickfergus	Sophie Hollran	Michael Callahan	
2003 (Christmas)	Carrickfergus	Cloe Skelton	Casey Wallace	
2004	Carrickfergus	Emma McBride	Julie Gower	
2004	Bangor	Devon Crossley	Niomi Stewart	
2005	Carrickfergus	Gemma Hall	Samantha Gray	
2005	Newtownabbey	Kirsty Crawford	Megan McConnell	
2005	Bangor	Hayley McCann	Kathryn Rutherford	
2006	Carrickfergus	Cherelle Duffrin	Donald Montgomery	
2006	Bangor	Nicole McGoogin	Tammy Corbett	
2007	Northern Ireland	Rachael Stewart	Laura May Lenehan	
2008	Northern Ireland	Rachel Pearson	Caitlin McClurg	
2009	Northern Ireland	Anna Guest	Nicole Campbell	
2010	Northern Ireland	Emma Lowry	Jessica Hammond	Saoirse Hallam

== Other alumni ==
Other judges

- Andy Pugh 2002-2008
- Maurice Taggart 2002-2004
- Fat Tam 2004-2005
- Justin Macartney 2002-2003
- Mark White 2006
- Minty 2007
- Justin McGurk 2007
- Keri Moore 2007
- Seaneen Kane 2007
- Garrett O'Hare 2008
- Natalie Miller 2008

Runners-up

- 2002 Joanne Corrigan
- 2002 Shauna Walker
- 2002 Angela Kennedy
- 2003 Nicole Sloan
- 2003 Laura Gilbert
- 2003 Lauren Dunahoe
- 2003 Sam White
- 2004 Stacey McCalister
- 2004 Seaneen Kane
- 2005 Sarah Hutcheson
- 2005 Becky Steed
- 2005 & 2006 Julianna Edlin
- 2006 Hannah Rose Henning
- 2007 Deborah Morrison
- 2007 Eiblin Stewart
- 2008 Brooklyn Dunseith
- 2008 John Gillen
- 2009 Aoife Kane
- 2009 Leona Hughes
- 2010 Shauna Lillywhite
- 2010 Zoe Skillen
- 2010 Kerry Wilson
