= Queen's Radio =

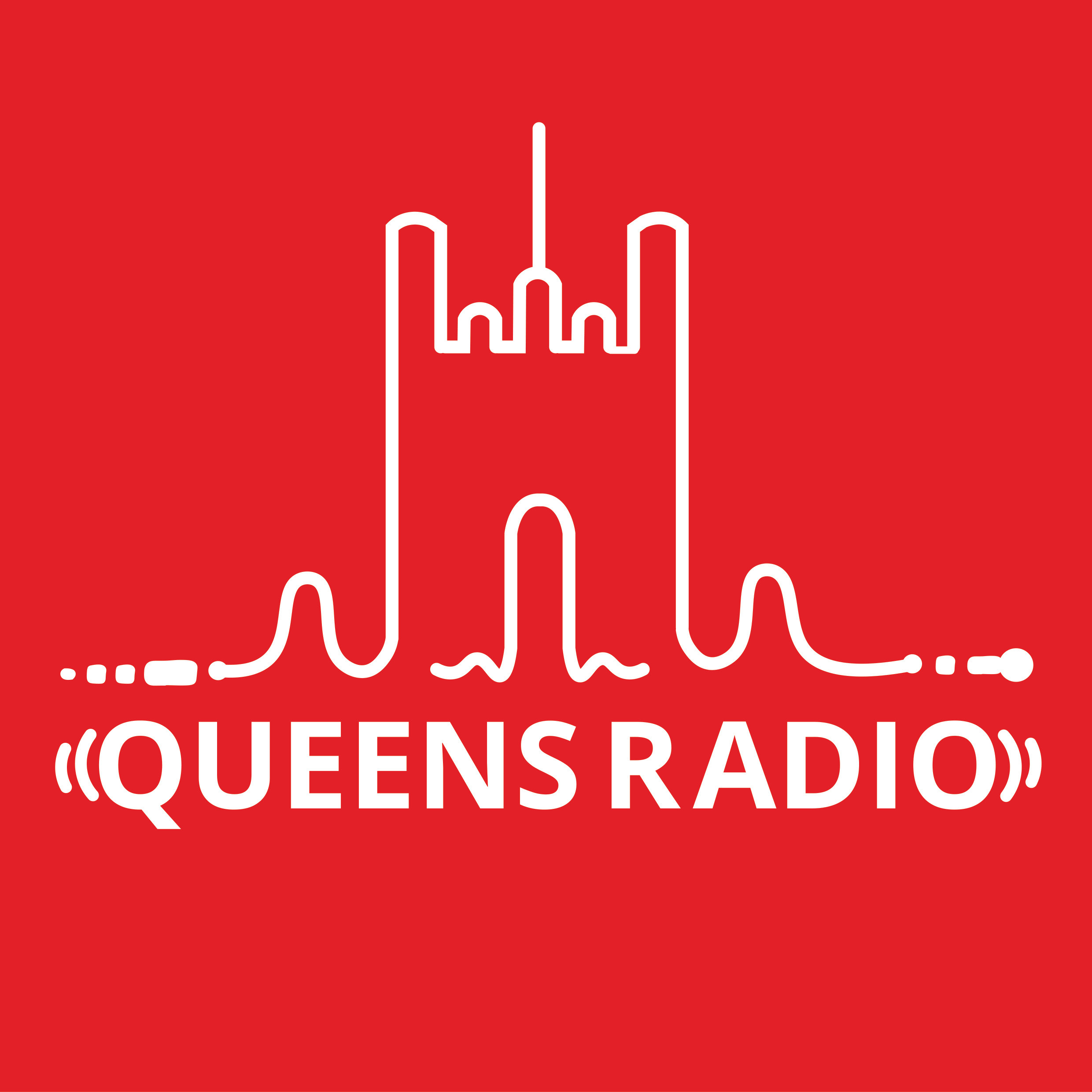
- Belfast; Northern Ireland

Programming
- Format: Student radio

Ownership
- Owner: Queen's University Belfast

History
- First air date: 29 September 2003

Links
- Webcast: URL Listen Live
- Website: queensradio.org

Queen's Radio (or QR) is a student radio station, based at Queen's University, Belfast, Northern Ireland. Its programming consists of a wide variety of shows and music from across genres. It is currently broadcasting via online stream and on smart speakers via TuneIn.

Its studios are located in the Students' Union building at One Elmwood. It is the only licensed student station broadcasting in Northern Ireland, and one of several on the island of ireland.

== History ==
Queen's Radio began broadcasting on 29 September 2003, initially over the Queen's University campus network and then the internet. In late 2005, the station was successful in acquiring a low-powered AM licence, allowing it to broadcast to Queen's Halls of Residence (Elms Village) directly via Medium Wave. This service commenced on 6 February 2006 and ended in 2009. However the station may recommece broadcasting over the air via the Belfast DAB Multiplex in the near future.

Queen's Radio is operated by the 'Queen's University of Belfast Radio Club', which was originally formed in 1953, making it two years older than the independent student newspaper The Gown. The old Radio Club was a general purpose electronics, amateur radio and computer club, and provided facilities for students to pursue hobby interests in these areas and participated in amateur radio contests, etc. In the late 1990s the University evicted it from its premises in Fitzwilliam St and the club became almost dormant for several years.

In 2001, the Radio Club was taken over by a group of students with the intention of forming a broadcast radio station, and giving QUB students experience of all aspects of broadcast radio. After two years of acquiring equipment, building up membership and negotiating with the Students' Union for premises, the station was ready to broadcast at the start of term in the 2003/04 academic year. The first live show was 'The Lunchbox' presented by Ian Llewellyn, although a pilot show had already been recorded by Shane Horan before the summer break.

There was previously a temporary RSL (restricted service licence) FM radio station at Queen's called 'Fresh Air'. This operated during the first four weeks of term in September 1995 and was hosted by Cool FM DJs and some students, including the now BBC Radio Ulster presenter/producer Donna Legge, Citybeat presenters Stuart Robinson, Pádraig Mac Donnchadha and Downtown Radio DJ Linda Cullen, but it was not set up or run by students at Queen's.

Before Queen's Radio was set up in its current form, Queen's University had rejected a proposal from university staff to set up a station at Queen's – it was judged to be too expensive to set up and maintain. Now, it is considered to be a major attraction for the university to prospective undergraduates.

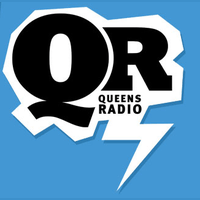
Logo used from 2003-2009

In 2006, the station was granted a licence to broadcast using Medium Wave to the Elms BT9 Accommodation village in South Belfast. In 2009 the station made headlines when it aired an advert for reducing carbon emissions, which Sammy Wilson had banned from being broadcast in Northern Ireland. In late 2009, the station pulled its Medium Wave transmission but continued to broadcast via its online player available from the station's website.

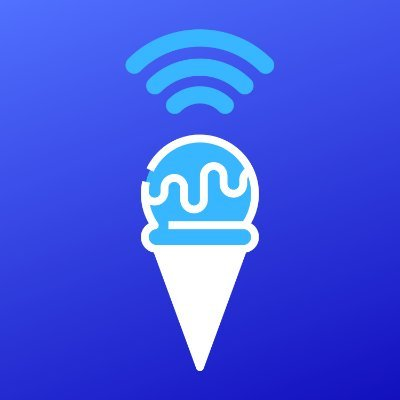
The Scoop is QR's news and current affairs department

Over the next few years, Queen's Radio continued to widen its offering to students in all aspects of the media. QRTV was launched in 2015 as the video branch of the station, hosting sit down interviews, game shows and music sessions. It continues to do this including working with other societies to provide photo/video coverage of events and concerts. The Scoop is the stations news & current affairs branch, offering a diverse range of written and audio based content. It has won multiple awards over the years for its interviews with politicians, political groups and discussions covering current topics.

Since 2020, Queen’s Radio have been part of the SRA, being the only affiliate station in the NI region. Just before COVID, in 2018, it relocated from its original home adjacent to the Students Union into the Union building, giving a larger focus towards The Scoop and QRTV, and student-produced podcasts. Its most recent move into the new Student's Union in 2022 allowed full visualisation of the studio, alongside industry standard setups for both live and podcast based shows.

The station has hosted everything from specialised shows on the Irish language and world cultures, to sport, gossip, current affairs, popular breakfast & drivetime shows, and its largest ever feat of a 24 hour live visuals special for the 2024 US Election.

Currently, the station is managed by Enya Gleeson (station manager) and _____ (deputy station manager).

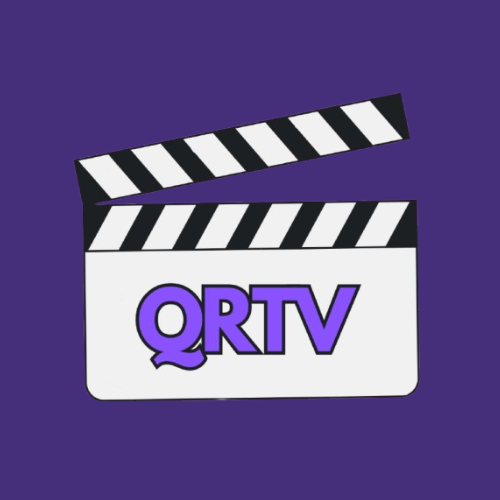
QRTV

== Departments ==
Queen's Radio currently operates under 7 departments and 3 brands. Among these are The Scoop (news and current affairs) and QRTV (visuals, editing) which operate as autonomous departments, producing their own content.

== Awards ==
In November 2005, the station was awarded the Gold Award for Best Technical Achievement for its computer-based Record of Transmission / Archiving system at the Student Radio Awards. In 2010 the station had three shows nominated for the Irish Smedia Awards. It also won Best Contribution to SU Media and the QUB Union awards, and was nominated for Most Improved Society of the Year.

In April 2013, Queen's Radio DJ Christopher McBride was long listed for the Sony Golden Headphones Award for the UK's favourite presenter.

In April 2017, Queen's Radio presenter Matthew Kirk was awarded the National Student Media (Smedia) award for Radio DJ of the Year.

In March 2019, Queen's Radio's News and Current Affairs outlet, The Scoop, was nominated for the Student Media Outlet of the Year by the Union of Students in Ireland (USI) in their annual Student Achievement Awards Ireland ceremony.. In March 2019, Queen's Radio won the Queen's University Students' Union 'Society of the Year' award.

In April 2019, Queen's Radio was nominated for the National Student Media award in the Radio Production of the Year – News & Current Affairs category. The nomination was in recognition of their coverage of the 2018 United States Mid-Term Election cycle. The team included; Rory Hughes, Michael Jardine, Scott Duffield, Chloe Murray Jessica Lawerence, Jane Corscadden & Robert Murtagh.

In April 2019, Queen's Radio received the QUBSU Society of the Year award at the Queen's University SU Awards, this was in recognition for the society's involvement with the Students' Union across the year and development of the society for its members.

In 2021 Queen's Radio news team The Scoop received three 2020/21 SMEDIAs. The flagship current affairs show, The Scoop On Sunday, presented by Thomas Copeland and produced by Darragh Tibbs, won News Programme of The Year. Olivia Fletcher, The Editor of the Scoop won Journalist of The Year and The Best Radio Journalist of the Year was also won by Thomas Copeland, Head of News. Furthermore in 2021, The Scoop Team also received a 2020/21 SRA Amplify Award for best team, with Thomas Copeland also receiving Silver in the Overall Amplify Award category. Thomas Copeland was also successful at the Union of Students in Ireland awards, receiving the Individual Contribution to Student Media Award. Queen's Radio was also nominated for 2 SU awards, Championing Wellbeing, Celebrating Innovative Online Activities and Adapting to Challenging times. Darragh Tibbs, the Head of Tech, received the Adapting to Challenging Times award.

Throughout 2021–2025, it has continued to receive multiple awards from the SRA, SPA and SMEDIAS.

== See also ==
- List of student radio stations in the United Kingdom
- Queens University Belfast
