= Pete Snodden in the Morning =

Radio programme in Northern Ireland

- Genre: Talk; Music
- Running time: 4 hours (6:00 am – 10:00 am)
- Country of origin: Northern Ireland, United Kingdom
- Language(s): English
- Home station: Cool FM
- Hosted by: Pete Snodden; Kirstie McMurray (2004–2012); Nigel Ringland (2009–2012); Paulo Ross (2014–present); Rebecca McKinney (2015–present)
- Recording studio: Newtownards, Northern Ireland
- Original release: 2004 – 2 November 2012, 2 June 2014 – present
- Audio format: FM and Digital radio
- Website: coolfm.co.uk

Pete Snodden in the Morning, previously known as the Pete Snowden Breakfast show, is the breakfast show on Cool FM in Northern Ireland, presented by Pete Snodden along with Paulo Ross and Rebecca McKinney. It originally aired from 2004 until 2 November 2012 and returned on 2 June 2014. It airs from 6:00am to 10:00am on weekdays.

== 2004–2012 ==
Pete's team of co-presenters on the original show included Kirstie McMurray and sports presenter Nigel Ringland.

Features on the show include:

- School Run Spy

The show was Northern Irelands biggest commercial radio show when it came off the air originally in 2012. On Monday 15 October, It was announced the show would be ending and ended on Friday 2 November 2012. The show was replaced with "Cool Breakfast" hosted by Gareth Stewarts and Connor Phillips while Snodden hosted Snodden Show on Cool FM.

== 2014–present ==
The show returned on 2 June 2014 as part of a major reshuffle at Cool FM.

Paulo Ross co-presents alongside Snodden. Rebecca McKinney joined in 2015.
