= Tabby Callaghan =

Irish musician

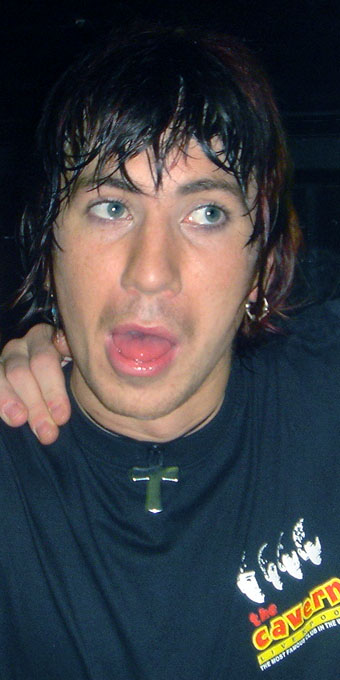
- Tabby Callaghan

Background information
- Born: Trevor John O'Callaghan; 22 April 1981 (age 45)
- Origin: Sligo, Ireland
- Genres: Pop, rock
- Occupation: Musician
- Instruments: Vocals, guitar
- Years active: 1998–present
- Website: www.tabbyocallaghan.co.uk

Tabby Callaghan (born Trevor John O'Callaghan; 22 April 1981, County Sligo, Ireland) is an Irish musician. He was the last contestant eliminated on the first series of The X Factor in 2004.

== Early career ==
Callaghan played in many collectives and groups as a teenager growing up in Sligo. With his brother Dominic he formed his first real band, called Petronella around 1997. The band had some success in Ireland and their single "Feeling So Low" entered the Irish top 20 singles chart.

== The X Factor ==
After Petronella dissolved, Callaghan then formed Boom, later renamed DZ5. DZ5 auditioned for the first series of ITV talent show The X Factor, unaware that the new show's willingness to accept groups only applied to vocal groups.

The panel of judges, Simon Cowell, Louis Walsh and Sharon Osbourne, advised Callaghan to re-audition as an individual contestant in order to proceed in the competition. He was selected by Osbourne to be one of her acts at the live shows. He was the last contestant eliminated overall in the semi-final. He later revealed that he had been advised by the show's producers to drop the 'O' in his surname to make it sound more commercial and less Irish.

== Post X Factor ==
After The X Factor, Callaghan participated in a fly-on-the-wall "rockumentary" titled What Tabby Did Next which was shown ITV in August 2005, coinciding with the release of his debut single in Ireland. The single, called "Number One", was originally titled "Holes in My Shoes". The A-side, "Number One", was an original track penned by Callaghan himself and Mark Hudson (who had worked with him on The X Factor). The B-side was a cover of the Slade hit "My Oh My" which had been performed on the show. The single, only released in Ireland, entered the Irish charts at No. 7 in the first week of its release.

In 2005, Callaghan performed at The Cavern Club in Liverpool, England. During the gig, Callaghan kicked off his boots in order to play in his bare feet, which is his trademark; however, his boots were taken from the stage by a fan. The Cavern Club management then provided him with an old pair of boots in their office which had been left behind by Ronnie Wood of The Rolling Stones. He joined the Belfast CityBeat contest Young Star Search for the 2008 season.

== Discography ==
=== Albums ===
- Bread vs. Art (2010)

=== Singles ===
==== Petronella ====
- "Drowning" (1999)
- "Feeling So Low" (1999)
- "Oh No" (1999)
- "Greed" (2000)

==== Tabby ====
- "Number One" (August 2005)
- "Gotta Get Control" (April 2011)

==== Tabby and The Tsars ====
- "Never Forget You" (2006)
- "Brendan's Song" (2006)
- "Never Forget You" (2006)
- "Take A Swing" (2006)
- ”Row The Boat" (2023)
