= Keith Law =

Keith Law may refer to:

- Keith Law (comedian), actor, director and musician
- Keith Law (writer) (born 1973), American baseball writer
