= Unitary authority =

Type of local government body that covers two levels of government

A unitary authority is a type of local authority in New Zealand and the United Kingdom. Unitary authorities are responsible for all local government functions within their areas, or perform additional functions that elsewhere are usually performed by multiple tiers of local government.

Typically, unitary authorities cover towns or cities that are large enough to function independently of a council or other authority. An authority can be a unit of a county or combined authority.

== New Zealand ==
In New Zealand, a unitary authority is a territorial authority (district, city or metropolitan area) that also performs the functions of a regional council. As of 2026, there are five unitary authorities. They are (with the year they were constituted): Gisborne District Council (1989), Tasman District Council (1992), Nelson City Council (1992), Marlborough District Council (1992), and Auckland Council (2010).

The Chatham Islands, located east of the South Island, have a council with its own special legislation, constituted (1995) with powers similar to those of a regional authority.

== United Kingdom ==
Each of the four countries of the United Kingdom uses a different term to describe their unitary authorities. However, the Office for National Statistics uses the collective term 'unitary administration' to describe all local government areas which operate as unitary authorities.

=== England ===
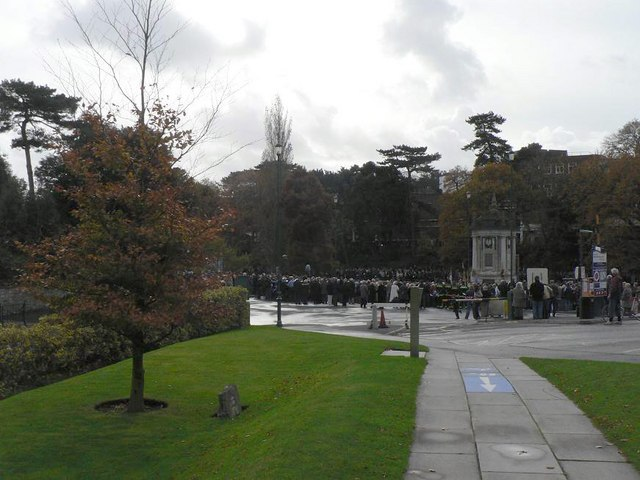
Bournemouth: Unitary Authority tree. The tree on the left, on the concourse of the Bournemouth Town Hall, was planted on 1 April 1997 to mark the occasion of Bournemouth council becoming a unitary authority on that day. This was part of the local government reorganisation of the late 1990s, when certain more urban districts were essentially separated from the relevant county council, with no services for Bournemouth residents now being carried out by Dorset County Council.

In England, "unitary authorities" are those local authorities set up in accordance with the Local Government Changes for England Regulations 1994 made under powers conferred by the Local Government Act 1992 to form a single tier of local government in specified areas and which are responsible for almost all local government functions within such areas. While outwardly appearing to be similar, single-tier authorities formed using older legislation are not unitary authorities thus excluding e.g. the Council of the Isles of Scilly or any other single-tier authority formed under the older legislation and not since given the status of a unitary authority.

This is distinct from the two-tier system of local government that still exists in much of England, under which local government functions are divided between county councils (the upper tier) and district or borough councils. Until 1996, two-tier systems existed in Scotland and Wales, but these have now been replaced by systems based on a single tier of local government, with some functions shared between groups of adjacent authorities. A single-tier system has existed in Northern Ireland since 1973.

For many years, the description of the number of tiers in UK local government arrangements has routinely ignored any current or previous bodies at the lowest level of authorities elected by the voters within their area such as parish (in England and Wales) or community councils; such bodies do not exist or have not existed in all areas.

=== Northern Ireland ===
Districts of Northern Ireland

Northern Ireland is divided into eleven districts for local government purposes. In Northern Ireland local councils have no responsibility for education, road building or housing (though they do nominate members to the advisory Northern Ireland Housing Council). Their functions include waste and recycling services, leisure and community services, building control and local economic and cultural development. Since their reorganisation in 2015 councils in Northern Ireland have also taken on responsibility for planning functions. The collection of rates is handled by the Land and Property Services agency.

=== Scotland ===
Local authorities in Scotland are unitary in nature but not in name. The Local Government etc. (Scotland) Act 1994 created a single tier of local government throughout Scotland. On 1 April 1996, 32 local government areas, each with a council, replaced the previous two-tier structure, which had regional, islands and district councils. Comhairle nan Eilean Siar (formerly the Western Isles Council) uses the alternative Gaelic designation Comhairle. While the phrase "unitary authority" is not used in Scottish legislation (whether from the Scottish Parliament or the UK Parliament), the term can be encountered (used either descriptively or erroneously) in a few official publications and in (usually erroneous) use by United Kingdom government departments.

=== Wales ===
Local authorities in Wales are unitary in nature but are described by the Local Government (Wales) Act 1994 as "principal councils", and their areas as principal areas. Various other legislation (e.g. s.91(1) Environment Act 1995) includes the counties and county boroughs of Wales within their individual interpretations of the phrase "unitary authority" as an interpretive not a definitive description. In s.2 of the Act each council formed for a county is allocated the respective English and Welsh descriptions of "County Council" or "Cyngor Sir", each council formed for a County Borough is allocated the respective descriptions of "County Borough Council" or "Cyngor Bwrdeistref Sirol"; in all cases the shorter alternative forms "Council" or "Cyngor" can be used.

== Similar concepts in other jurisdictions ==
- In Canada, each province creates its own system of local government, including several analogous to unitary authorities:
  - In Alberta and Nova Scotia, there is only one level of local government.
  - In Ontario, the term single-tier municipalities is used, for a similar concept.
- In Germany, kreisfreie Stadt (lit. 'circle-free city') is the equivalent term for a city with the competences of both the Gemeinde (municipality) and the Kreis (district, literally circle) administrative level.
- In France, the city of Paris works like a department council and a municipal council. The department councils of the two departments of Corsica and of the region merged into a collectivité territoriale.
- In Poland, a City with powiat rights, or "urban county", is a city which is also responsible for district (poviat) administrative level, being part of no other powiat (e.g. Kraków, Łódź, Wrocław, Poznań). In total, 66 cities in Poland have this status.
- In Taiwan, most cities have only one tier of local government. Unlike the three county-administered cities (Chiayi, Keelung, and Hsinchu), they are independent of their surrounding county. Special municipalities, with the exception of a few mountain indigenous districts within them, are also unitary.
- In the United States, there are several types of single-tier governments.
  - In the states of Connecticut, Rhode Island, and much of Massachusetts, county government has been abolished, and the municipalities (known as New England towns) are the only governing tier below the state government.
  - Conversely, in Hawaii, municipal government below the county level has been abolished, and the state's counties are the only governing tier below the state government.
  - In Virginia, all municipalities with city status are, by definition, independent from any county.
  - The District of Columbia has had no lower tiers of government since the District of Columbia Organic Act of 1871.
  - In several states, certain municipalities are either accounted as independent cities (e.g. Baltimore) or consolidated city-counties (e.g. Philadelphia and San Francisco). In either case, there is a single local authority within the territory of the municipality, though in the latter case there may be a technical legal distinction between the city and county governments.
