= DJ Hix =

Hix
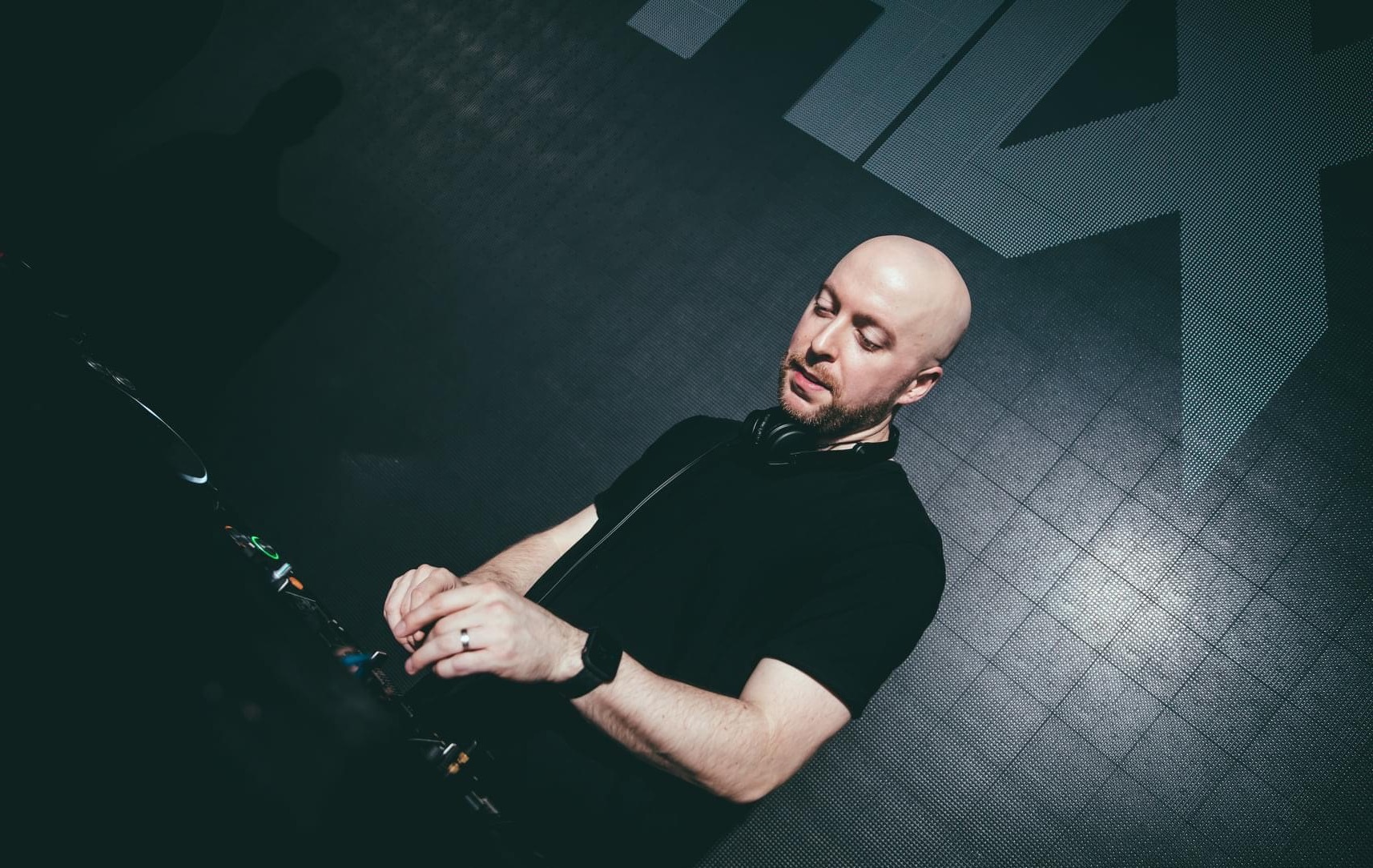
- Hix performing a live DJ set, 2021

Background information
- Born: London, England
- Genres: House; dance-pop
- Occupations: DJ; radio presenter; music producer
- Years active: 2002–present
- Labels: Warner Records, Casual Jam Records, Perfect Havoc

Hix is a Northern Irish DJ, music producer, songwriter, musician, broadcaster and radio presenter. He is also occasionally referred to as DJ Hix. He is known for presenting radio shows on Cool FM, a commercial radio station based in Newtownards, Northern Ireland, and on Kiss FM UK. He is also known for his live DJ sets and his commercially released music. Hix was born in London before moving to Northern Ireland at a young age.

== Radio ==
Hix began his career as a DJ in 2002 in various clubs in Belfast, and his radio career began when he was invited by BBC 1Xtra to host their Xtra Talent show in January, February and April 2007. The show is BBC 1Xtra's platform for new rising radio personalities to broadcast a 2-hour show every week for one month.

A few months after his time at 1Xtra he began broadcasting on Cool FM on 27 October 2007. On 1 June 2010 he moved to 5 days a week on Cool FM by launching a brand new evening show on the station called "The Pulse". The show focused on fresh new music from all music genres. In 2012, following changes at the station, DJ Hix moved to the "Drivetime" show, which aired Monday to Friday from 4 pm until 8 pm. A few years later, Hix returned to the 7 pm slot to host "The Cool FM Evening Show" and has been presenting this show ever since. It airs Mon-Thurs 7pm-10 pm. He also presents the dance music shows on the station - "Elevate" airs every Friday from 7 pm - 10 pm, and Saturday from 6 pm - 9 pm, featuring the biggest and freshest dance music. In addition to this, he presents "The NI Hit40 Chart Show", which is simulcast on Cool FM and Downtown Radio every Sunday from 4-7 pm.

Hix also presents a dance show on Kiss FM UK on Thursday evenings.

== Music ==
In 2022 Hix began his career as an artist and music producer when he signed a major label record deal with Warner Records in 2021. He released his debut single "Hold You" on Friday 27 March 2022. It featured Jessica Hammond on vocals, with the chorus of the track being an interpolation of Kevin Lyttle's 2002 global smash hit "Turn Me On". Hix's song received widespread international support with plays on BBC Radio 1, Capital, Kiss, Hits Radio and more, as well as playlist on Capital Dance, iRadio, Cool FM, Q Radio, RTE and more. In October 2022 the song was featured on the itv show "The Only Way Is Essex". Hix's second single was released on Friday 11 November 2022, and is a collaboration with Kelli-Leigh called "Oh No You Didn't".

== DJ career ==
Hix has performed with some of the world's biggest artists in concert. To date he has supported David Guetta, Tiesto, Calvin Harris, Deadmau5, Martin Garrix, 50 Cent, Rihanna, Joel Corry, Camelphat, Alesso, Oliver Heldens and many more

In 2023 he made his Ibiza debut, playing at Ibiza Rocks with Joel Corry.

In 2011 Hix was awarded Best Club DJ at the annual FATE Awards, after a public vote to decide the 5 nominees.

Hix currently DJs weekly in a vast number of clubs in Northern Ireland and the Republic of Ireland as well as various guest performances in other cities in the UK and across Europe.
