= 101.2 FM =

FM radio frequency

The following radio stations broadcast on FM frequency 101.2 MHz:

== China ==
- CNR The Voice of China in Chifeng and Zhengzhou

== United Kingdom ==
- Heart West in Soar
- Smooth North East in Hexham
- Purbeck Coast FM in Swanage
- Q Radio Tyrone and Fermanagh in Omagh
