= 98FM (disambiguation) =

98FM usually refers to Dublin's 98FM, a radio station in Ireland.

98FM may refer to these radio stations using 98MHz:

- Lisburn's 98FM
- WKCQ
- WDZH, also known as "98-7 Amp Radio".
