= Recycling in the United Kingdom =

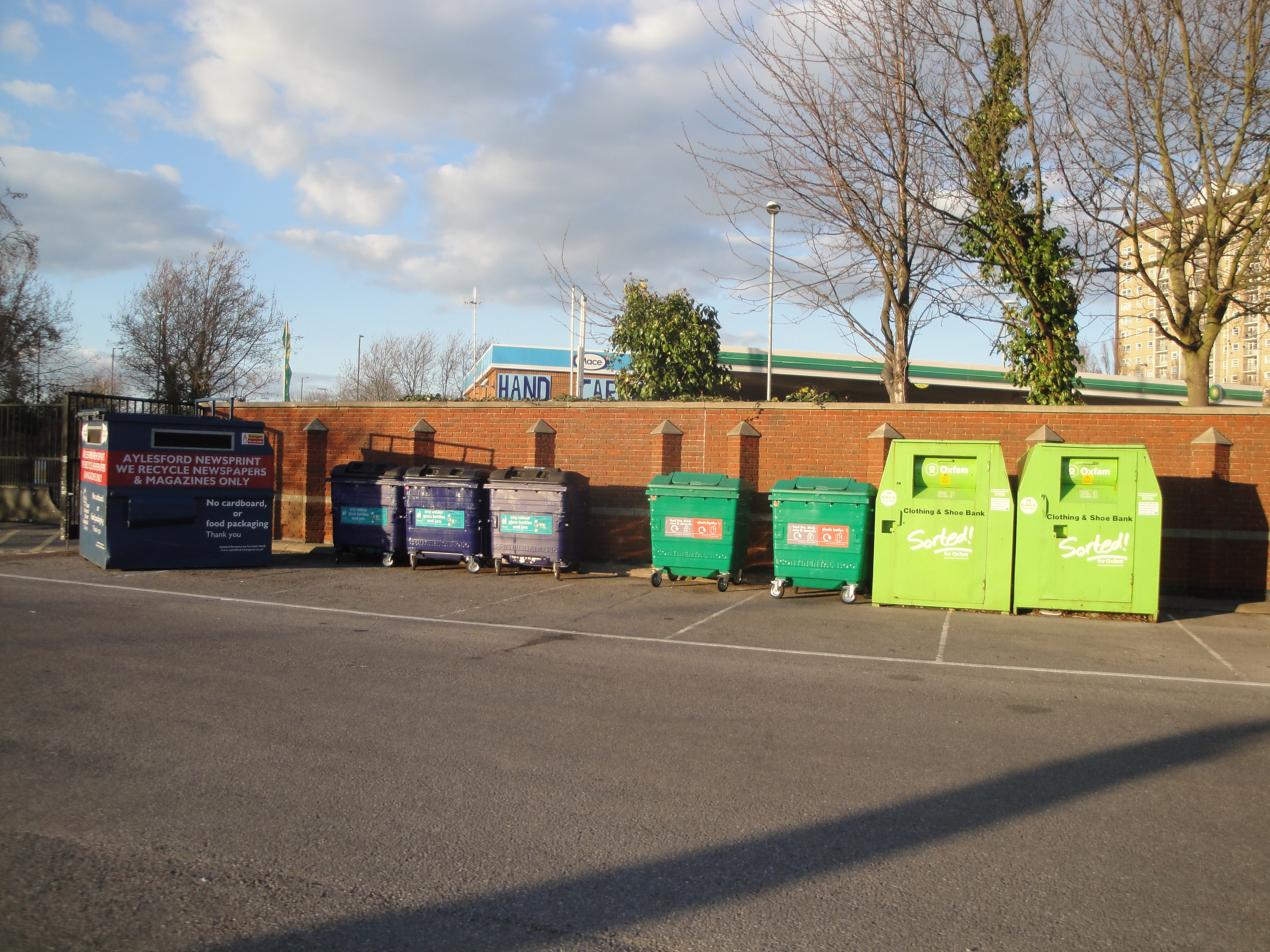
Recycling collection site in Portsmouth, Hampshire

In 2022, the recycling rate from UK households was 44%. The majority of recycling undertaken in the UK is done by statutory authorities, although commercial and industrial waste is chiefly processed by private companies. Local authorities are responsible for the collection of municipal waste and operate contracts which are usually kerbside collection schemes. The Household Waste Recycling Act 2003 required local authorities in England to provide every household with a separate collection of at least two types of recyclable materials by 2010. Recycling policy is devolved to the administrations of Scotland, Northern Ireland and Wales who set their own targets, but all statistics are reported to Eurostat.

== Incentives ==
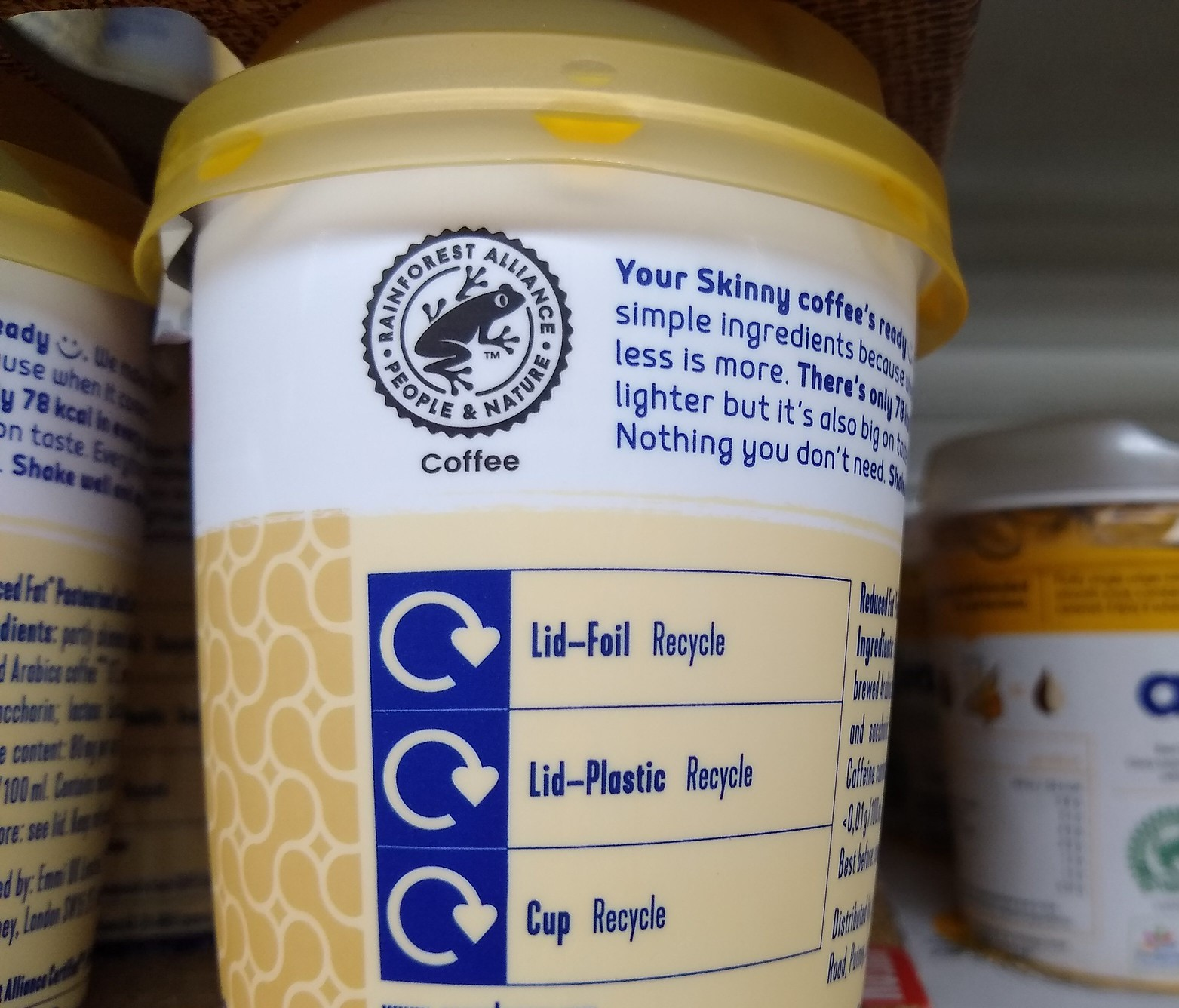
Example of an On Pack Recycling Label (OPRL), showing that all three components of the product are recyclable

Local authorities are given incentives towards meeting recycling targets set by European, national and regional Government by the imposition of financial penalties for failing to recycle. For example, levies are imposed on the proportion of waste material going to landfill under a landfill tax, which currently stands at £94.15 per tonne.

Unlike other European countries, there are very few deposit-refund schemes in operation. The Defra Packaging Strategy of 2009 supported reward-based programmes, but other than some trials in Scotland, they have received almost no public or political attention. This may be due to the lack of evidence that they improve the recycling rate in a UK context. In December 2018, the Department for Business, Energy & Industrial Strategy (DEFRA) has announced plans for a pledge of up to £60m towards innovative new packaging. One initiative in this is to assess the viability of household food waste being "transformed into environmentally-friendly plastic bags and cups." Scottish Parliament passed legislation to create a deposit return scheme including glass in May 2020 and later that year the UK Parliament passed the United Kingdom Internal Market Act. The UK Government refused to grant an exemption to the Act, forcing the Scottish Government to announce in 2023 that it would delay the scheme until October 2025 earliest, when a UK-wide deposit scheme is hoped to be implemented: Circular Economy Minister at the time, Lorna Slater, claimed the "UK Government ... has sadly seemed so far more intent on sabotaging this parliament than protecting our environment".

The establishment of the government body Waste & Resources Action Programme has increased the country's recycling capacity. It is a registered charity. It works with businesses, individuals and communities to achieve a circular economy through helping them reduce waste, develop sustainable products and use resources in an efficient way. WRAP was established in 2000 as a company limited by guarantee. and receives funding from the Department for Environment, Food and Rural Affairs (Defra), the Northern Ireland Executive, Zero Waste Scotland, the Welsh Government and the European Union.

From 31 March 2025, most workplaces in England have mandated separating out dry recycling (glass, metal and paper), food waste and non-recyclables before collection. Micro-firms, defined as having fewer than 10 full-time equivalent employees, are exempt until 31 March 2027. This requirement also applies to workplaces that provide bins to customers. All premises must collect and separate food waste even if they do not serve food or contain a kitchen.

== Household recycling ==
Districts of England by household recycling rate (2016–17): ≥60% 50–59.9% 40–49.9% 30–39.9% <30%

UK domestic recycling policy is geared towards encouraging individuals to recycle in their own homes, through regulation and public awareness campaigns. These include fines for people who don't cut their household waste and a greater emphasis on separating waste into different recyclable materials, with each council applying different rules. Their focus is shifting toward encouraging recycling, rather than punishing households for non-recycled waste.

Recycling is most efficient when items are reused around the home rather than discarded. Other approaches include taking glass items to bottle banks at supermarkets and composting biodegradable waste, making landfill unnecessary.

According to the latest figures from Defra:

- 44.3% of household waste was recycled in 2015
- There was a 235% increase in household recycling in England between 2000/01 and 2009/10.
- 26.7 million tonnes of household waste was generated in 2015, of which ~11.6 million tonnes was recycled, reused or composted.
- In 2015, dry recycling was the largest component of recycled waste, comprising 59% of the total.

A 2018 survey by the Ball Corporation studied the publics concerns and thoughts on recycling in the UK:

- 86% of all British adults claim to be worried about the matter, and 90% of the people aged 55 and above show the most concern.
- Despite this, only 67% claim to 'often' take action to reduce plastic pollution, for example by recycling and changing shopping habits to buy alternatives to disposable plastic.

== Industrial recycling ==
Commercial and industrial (C&I) waste makes up a large proportion of the UK's waste. According to DEFRA, 48 million tonnes of C&I waste was generated in England in 2009, down from 67.9 million tonnes 6 years earlier. Furthermore, 52% of C&I waste was reused or recycled, compared to just 42% in 2002/03. This figure is also greater than the household recycling rate. The industrial and service sectors generate roughly equal amounts of waste with similar recycling rates, even though the service sector is economically larger. The reporting of C&I waste statistics has not always met the European Commission's standards, with local councils using different methodologies for their statistics. There has also been no comprehensive survey of C&I waste since 2003.

== EU directives in the UK ==
The EU has introduced a number of directives which determine the targets of UK domestic recycling policy:

The 1999 Landfill Directive is one of the most important of these, which demands a reduction in the amount of waste being sent to landfill from 11.2 million tonnes in 2010 to 7.46 million tonnes in 2013

In 2010, Defra claimed that the UK would meet its first landfill diversion target, which was 75% on 1995 levels, and that it is ‘on track’ to meet the next targets in 2013 (50% on 1995 levels) and 2020 (35% on 1995 levels).

The EU Waste Framework Directive states that the UK must recycle 50% of household waste by 2020, which includes composting and reusing waste. It also stipulates a 70% minimum recycling target for construction and demolition waste by 2020. The British government is highly confident in meeting the 2020 recycling target, but there is a lower level of certainty with the 2020 Landfill Directive target. There may not be enough time to construct the necessary facilities for organic waste.

== Main aspects of UK recycling policy ==
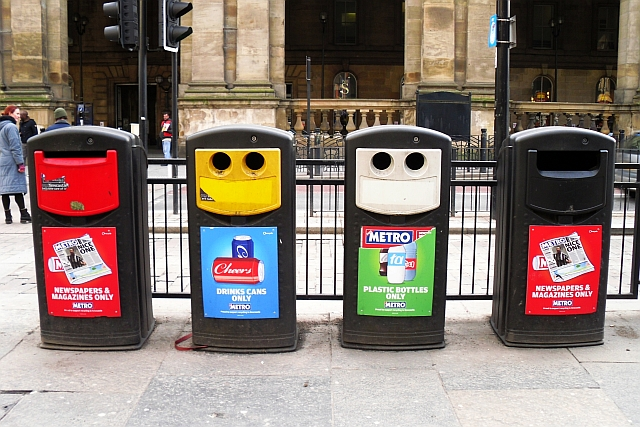
Public recycling bins for newspaper, cans, and plastics in Newcastle upon Tyne

UK recycling policy aims to improve recycling methods and levels across the UK, focusing on glass, paper, plastic and metal cans.

=== Glass ===
Glass can be recycled in the form of bottles and jars which are crushed down and then melted. Glass can be recycled infinitely because it does not lose any of its quality. It uses a lot less energy, fewer raw materials and produces less CO_{2} than manufacturing glass from scratch. The main difficulty with recycling glass is the need to remove the unwanted materials that contaminate it and avoiding the mixing of different colours.

Glass collection points, known as Bottle Banks are very common near shopping centres, at civic amenity sites and in local neighbourhoods in the United Kingdom. Bottle Banks commonly stand beside collection points for other recyclable waste like paper, metals and plastics. Local, municipal waste collectors usually have one central point for all types of waste in which large glass containers are located. There are now over 50,000 bottle banks in the United Kingdom, and 752,000 tons of glass are now recycled annually.

The waste recycling industry in the UK cannot consume all of the recycled container glass that will become available over the coming years, mainly due to the colour imbalance between that which is manufactured and that which is consumed. The UK imports much more green glass in the form of Wine bottles than it uses, leading to a surplus amount for recycling. The resulting surplus of green glass from imported bottles may be exported to producing countries, or used locally in the growing diversity of secondary end uses for recycled glass.

=== Paper ===
All types of waste paper are recyclable, and recycled paper requires a lot less energy and fewer raw materials to produce than manufacturing it from scratch. However, paper cannot be recycled indefinitely, and the normal number of times it can be recycled is about six. 12.5 million tonnes of paper and cardboard are used annually in England.

=== Plastic ===
In the UK, the amount of post-consumer plastic being recycled is relatively low, due in part to a lack of recycling facilities. The challenge with recycling plastic lies in sorting differing types of plastic, often by hand, which slows the process. The Plastics 2020 Challenge was founded in 2009 by the plastics industry with the aim of engaging the British public in a nationwide debate about the use, reuse and disposal of plastics, and hosts a series of debates on its website framed around the waste hierarchy.

Since 2024, caps have been tethered (attached) to plastic bottles due to a change with EU law and to reduce plastic waste. Although the UK was already a non-EU member at the time, many manufactures have nevertheless shipped goods to the UK with tethered caps for consistency.

=== Metal cans ===
There is a high recycling rate for metal cans in the UK, with aluminium recycling and steel cans being the most common items. Metal can be recycled indefinitely, and aluminium cans use just 5% of the energy needed to produce them from scratch and only release 5% of the amount of greenhouse gases. In addition, it is the easiest material to extract and separate from the other recyclables, using magnets for steel cans and special magnets (eddy currents) it guarantees recycling of every can.

=== Other materials ===
==== Cartons ====
In 2013, the Alliance for Beverage Cartons and the Environment and Sonoco Alcore opened the UK's first carton recycling facility in Halifax. Prior to this, recycling was limited because of the high shipping costs for export, but the new plant processes 40 per cent of the country's carton waste. Problems also arise because cartons cannot use recycled fibre, so they are converted into cardboard instead.

==== Electronics ====
The European Union implemented the Waste Electrical and Electronic Equipment Directive (WEEE Directive, 2002/96/EC) in February 2003. It requires manufacturers to shoulder the burden of recycling by reimbursing the recyclers' costs. It also set a minimum quota of 4 kg per capita of e-waste per head by 2009.

The United Kingdom was the final member state to pass it into law. The success of the WEEE directive has varied significantly from state to state, with collection rates varying between 13 kilograms per capita per annum to as little as 1 kg per capita per annum. Computers & electronic wastes collected from households within Europe are treated under the WEEE directive via Producer Compliance Schemes (whereby manufacturers of Electronics pay into a scheme that funds its recovery from household waste recycling centres (HWRCs)) and nominated Waste Treatment Facilities (known as Obligated WEEE).

However, recycling of ex corporate Computer Hardware and associated electronic equipment falls outside the Producer Compliance Scheme (Known as non-obligated). In the UK, Waste or obsolete corporate related computer hardware is treated via third party Authorized Treatment Facilities, who normally impose a charge for its collection and treatment.

== Local councils and recycling ==
Although recycling is required across the UK, recycling rules used to differ depending on the local council, with some local councils implementing a one container system for separating household waste, whereas others provided many more containers. Recyclable waste is often collected at different times from standard landfill waste collections.

In England, local authorities are given targets by Defra. It is these local targets which help the government to achieve its national targets. Local authorities were given flexibility in deciding how to best meet these targets, hence there was a number of different schemes in place, for example:

=== Ipswich ===
The Ipswich Borough Council did not collect glasses and Tetra Pak cartons from households. It also did not have a dedicated food waste container bin (which currently goes into the non-recycling bin). However due to a change with national legislation, the council began accepting glasses and Tetra Packs in household recycling bins from 1 June 2026. It now provides a weekly food waste collection.

=== London ===
The issue of waste management and recycling is acute in London - the capital produces 17 million tonnes of waste each year, forecast to rise to 26.5 million tonnes in 2020. The Mayor's Greater London Authority set the framework for dealing with waste within a London-wide Municipal Waste Management Strategy that included recycling targets for the London Boroughs to meet, made statutory within the London Plan. The existing organisational arrangements however are complex with a number of waste disposal authorities at sub-regional and local levels.

=== Simpler recycling ===
In late 2024, the UK Government changed the recycling policy in England, to standardise what local authorities provided in terms of recycling. The policy specified that by default, councils must provide a maximum of four containers, one for waste that cannot be recycled, one for food waste, one for paper and card and one for other dry recycling (plastic, metal and glass), and stipulated that items that can be recycled are the same in all areas. In addition, all councils in England had to provide a weekly food waste collection service from April 2026 (with exceptions to this date made when necessary to adhere to existing waste disposal contracts) and that plastic film must be collected from Q2 in 2027.

=== Civic amenity sites ===
Many local authorities provide a civic amenity site, where items can be taken and are subsequently recycled, that cannot be recycled via household collections. These recycling and reuse centres will often accept items such as cooking oil, batteries, appliances and furniture.

== Criticisms ==
There have been a number of controversies in recent years involving the recycling policies of various local councils:

=== Multiple containers ===
One of the major problems for recycling at home was the provision of multiple containers to sort the waste. This has been criticised for being too confusing for many residents, with one of the biggest offenders being the Newcastle-under-Lyme council which implemented a nine-bin system in 2010. Other councils have provided up to seven bins, although some private contractors provide only one, and separate the recyclable material themselves. This issue was addressed in subsequent changes made by the government at national level.

=== Fortnightly collections ===
When fortnightly collections were brought in during 2007, they caused a lot of controversy. Many people were against them because it meant that they had to keep hold of their waste for longer and it was feared that this could be unhygienic, with fears arising in the press about health problems being caused as a result. Research conducted by Cranfield University and Enviros in 2007, found that there is unlikely to be significantly greater health issues relating to fortnightly collections against weekly, and that using common sense to do things such as shut lids would stop vermin and odours becoming a problem.

In January 2014, the Secretary Of State for Communities and Local Government outlined guidance for how weekly collections could be achieved by local authorities. This was supported by a £250 million scheme made available to participating waste authorities. The Chartered Institution of Wastes Management (CIWM) questioned "whether the focus of the £250 million fund will deliver the best environmental and economic outcomes" and suggested that the money could better be spent on alternative options. It went on:

The additional money could more usefully have been focused on delivering improvements in three key areas: supporting more recycling, either by expanding the range of materials collected or improving participation; supporting an expansion in food waste collections, which is the main area of householder concern regarding collection frequency; and supporting waste prevention initiatives... In economic terms, with so many constraints on council budgets, it is important to ensure that this policy initiative does not lock local councils into significantly higher waste collection costs, for which we will all have to foot the bill long after the Weekly Collections Support Scheme funding has run dry.

=== Unsuitable collection vehicles ===
There has been criticism from residents of Newcastle-under-Lyme after the council spent £2.4 million to improve its recycling in the borough, however the fleet of new vehicles were too wide to fit down some narrow roads. This left some residents going for up to a fortnight without any waste collection service.

== See also ==
- British Metals Recycling Association
- Waste Disposal Authorities in Greater London
- Recycling in Northern Ireland
