= Recycling in Northern Ireland =

Recycling in Northern Ireland

In 2023-2024, roughly 51% of waste was recycled, composted, or reused in Northern Ireland. Northern Ireland's local councils have statutory responsibility for the collection and disposal of waste, and as such are the lead actors in promoting recycling. The Northern Ireland Department of the Environment published its first Waste Management Strategy in 2000. Subsequently, local councils came together to form three separate subregional waste management partnerships: arc21 (consisting of councils in the east of Northern Ireland), the North West Region Waste Management Group, and SWaMP (the Southern Waste Management Partnership). In 2015, SWaMP disbanded.

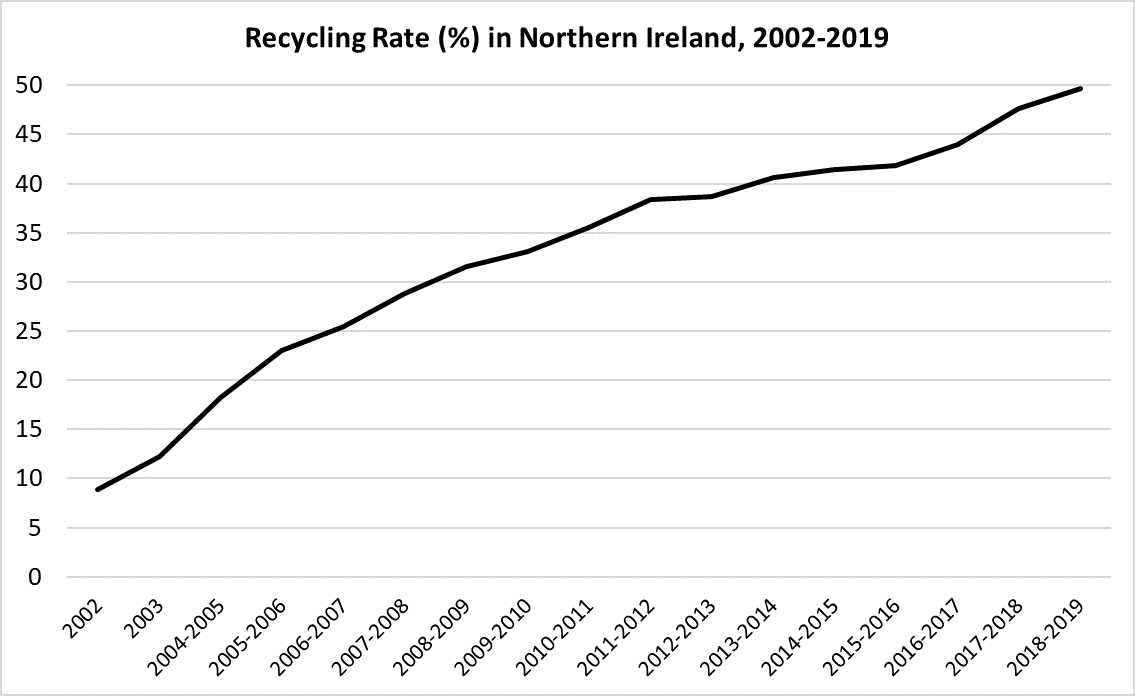
Rate of recycling in Northern Ireland, 2002-2019

In the original 2000 Waste Management Strategy, local councils were set the target of recycling and composting 15% of household waste by 2005 and 25% by 2010. In the second Waste Management Strategy, launched in early 2006, new, bolder targets were set for recycling (including composting) 35% of waste by 2010, 40% by 2015, and 45% by 2020. In June 2012, Northern Ireland's then environment minister Alex Attwood announced plans to make it compulsory for local councils to achieve a 60% waste recycling rate by 2020. According to data contained in the Northern Ireland Municipal Waste Management Statistics Annual Report 2010-11 (covering April 2010 to March 2011), the 2010 target was met, with the overall recycling rate reaching 35.5%.

Over the past decade recycling and composting rates have increased considerably in Northern Ireland from roughly 5% in 1999 to 51% in 2023–2024.

In addition to more waste being recycled and composted, the amount of waste being produced in the first place has gone down in recent years, decreasing from an all-time recorded high of 1,064,090 tonnes in 2006–2007 to a low of 913,546 tonnes in 2012–2013, rising to 999,913 tonnes in 2023–2024.

== Recycling Rates ==
Below are tables that summarise gains made in recent years in diverting waste from landfill through recycling, composting, and reuse. The figures in these tables refer to the proportion of total local authority collected municipal waste being sent for recycling and composting (and reuse starting in 2012-2013). The data come from Northern Ireland's Department of the Environment municipal waste reports. Since the mid-2000s, local councils in Northern Ireland have been required to report data on municipal waste arisings on a quarterly basis.

Year	Northern Ireland Total
2002	8.9
2003	12.2
2004-2005	18.2
2005-2006	23.0
2006-2007	25.5
2007-2008	28.8
2008-2009	31.6
2009-2010	33.1
2010-2011	35.5
2011-2012	38.4
2012-2013	38.8
2013-2014	40.7
2014-2015	41.4
2015-2016	41.8
2016-2017	44.0
2017-2018	47.6
2018-2019	49.8
2019-2020	51.1
2020-2021	50.0
2021-2022	49.7
2022-2023	49.7
2023-2024	50.6

Waste Management Group	2002	2003	04-05	05-06	06-07	07-08	08-09	09-10	10-11	11-12	12-13	13-14	14-15	15-16	16-17	17-18	18-19	19-20
arc21	8.7	10.4	16.5	21.5	24.8	27.9	30.6	32.2	35.3	37.7	38.3	40.9	41.5	40.6	42.6	47.1	49.2	50.8
NWRWMG	4.0	25.9	17.4	26.0	24.1	28.3	31.6	32.6	34.6	37.3	35.9	38.3	38.3	37.1	42.5	44.3	46.7	48.4
SWaMP	13.2	6.3	22.3	24.2	28.1	31.0	33.6	35.2	36.7	40.5	41.7	41.8	43.4	N/A	N/A	N/A	N/A	N/A

The table below contains information for the 26 councils that existed prior to the reorganisation of local government in 2015.

Waste Management Group	District Council	2002	2003	04-05	05-06	06-07	07-08	08-09	09-10	10-11	11-12	12-13	13-14/Q1	13-14/Q2	13-14/Q3	13-14/Q4
arc21	Antrim Borough Council	18.6	21.8	39.8	45.8	47.1	47.1	49.6	51.2	48.8	53.2	53.6	57.0	61.7	55.0	50.7
arc21	Ards Borough Council	9.0	8.4	19.4	22.9	24.5	26.3	31.8	37.2	37.9	38.2	35.6	39.1	38.5	32.1	27.5
SWaMP	Armagh City and District Council	15.9	22.8	25.7	29.1	35.0	38.5	36.8	38.7	41.1	43.4	41.0	43.2	46.4	38.4	36.5
arc21	Ballymena Borough Council	20.1	17.5	21.6	25.7	26.5	24.8	35.3	34.2	33.2	38.3	44.4	52.5	55.1	47.2	43.3
NWRWMG	Ballymoney Borough Council	6.3	7.5	22.2	21.4	21.9	24.0	29.9	34.1	33.6	35.2	32.8	36.1	38.3	30.2	27.6
SWaMP	Banbridge District Council	27.1	34.5	40.0	40.7	44.1	45.4	48.7	51.6	51.0	53.3	55.0	58.3	63.5	55.3	53.4
arc21	Belfast City Council	3.5	3.9	8.7	13.0	16.9	20.7	22.0	22.3	25.3	26.9	29.8	35.3	36.0	34.7	36.2
arc21	Carrickfergus Borough Council	7.5	8.8	14.6	15.0	19.5	29.3	28.4	30.9	41.3	46.1	40.8	46.3	46.8	34.8	31.9
arc21	Castlereagh Borough Council	4.7	12.6	22.7	33.2	35.6	35.7	37.0	38.0	41.2	42.3	40.9	43.3	48.6	38.0	35.0
NWRWMG	Coleraine Borough Council	6.2	10.6	17.8	24.0	22.4	25.6	34.4	29.8	33.5	37.8	36.6	32.6	43.5	33.5	29.6
SWaMP	Cookstown District Council	16.5	20.0	22.4	26.8	28.4	33.4	37.7	38.7	38.9	41.1	41.7	43.3	42.3	42.1	41.8
SWaMP	Craigavon Borough Council	14.4	21.5	21.6	25.6	26.2	29.0	30.8	33.1	36.0	41.0	46.5	45.4	47.6	40.2	36.8
NWRWMG	Derry City Council	2.3	6.0	11.9	28.3	23.6	28.3	29.6	29.6	29.2	29.8	28.1	30.3	41.7	37.1	36.1
arc21	Down District Council	11.7	13.3	16.8	29.2	27.8	26.0	27.0	28.3	29.3	31.0	32.0	33.2	33.9	26.0	29.1
SWaMP	Dungannon and South Tyrone BC	10.0	12.1	19.1	19.2	23.8	28.2	30.9	31.1	35.0	39.2	40.2	42.7	48.7	39.3	35.6
SWaMP	Fermanagh District Council	9.6	15.8	18.9	17.7	24.3	25.1	27.0	31.3	32.1	37.0	37.0	39.3	38.0	39.6	38.0
arc21	Larne Borough Council	5.8	8.7	14.5	23.1	28.4	32.1	34.7	35.3	38.2	53.0	52.8	54.9	55.1	47.1	40.6
NWRWMG	Limavady Borough Council	3.5	11.1	24.1	33.2	28.1	36.2	33.5	34.9	35.3	36.6	42.2	43.6	47.1	41.8	39.4
arc21	Lisburn City Council	8.1	8.5	13.7	21.1	24.8	31.6	32.6	36.5	39.4	40.0	37.8	44.0	47.3	38.8	34.3
NWRWMG	Magherafelt District Council	3.8	14.4	27.4	32.1	32.1	35.5	40.3	48.4	51.8	59.1	55.4	55.1	56.6	52.5	47.6
NWRWMG	Moyle District Council	1.9	4.1	9.5	18.0	21.1	29.0	28.1	32.6	33.9	38.5	36.9	38.8	41.1	46.0	44.0
SWaMP	Newry + Mourne District Council	8.7	12.3	18.2	22.7	25.8	26.0	27.8	28.8	28.9	32.5	33.1	32.9	38.6	32.1	30.1
arc21	Newtownabbey Borough Council	15.0	15.4	18.0	20.9	22.8	26.9	32.8	34.5	39.4	40.6	42.7	49.7	53.1	42.3	37.9
arc21	North Down Borough Council	9.3	16.2	19.8	20.1	26.8	30.6	32.6	34.4	42.9	44.3	44.0	50.7	47.6	39.9	34.3
SWaMP	Omagh District Council	8.5	11.8	17.9	15.9	23.6	32.5	40.0	37.4	38.0	42.8	42.6	46.7	47.0	40.0	38.6
NWRWMG	Strabane District Council	3.5	7.3	15.0	18.7	20.3	21.0	22.8	23.8	31.2	31.7	28.3	29.2	32.5	27.1	27.2

== See also ==
- Recycling
- Recycling in the United Kingdom
- Recycling in Ireland
