= Stephen Clements =

Northern Irish radio DJ and TV presenter (1972–2020)

- Born: 17 December 1972; Northern Ireland
- Died: 6 January 2020 (aged 47); Carrickfergus, Northern Ireland
- Occupation: Presenter
- Years active: 2010–2020
- Spouses: Natasha Beattie
- Children: 2

Stephen Clements (17 December 1972 – 6 January 2020) was a Northern Irish radio DJ and TV presenter. He was best known for hosting the Q Breakfast Show on Q Radio for seven years until June 2019, and The Stephen Clements Show on BBC Radio Ulster from September 2019 until his death.

== Personal life ==
Clements was born in Larne in on 17 December 1972 and was the son of Roy and Helen Clements and also had a brother, Gavin. He later married Natasha Beattie and had two children, Poppy and Robbie. He also had two cousins, Simon and Wendy Davis.

Clements studied geography at university and lived in South Korea for a period teaching English. Prior to his radio career, Clements was a salesman.

Clements died as a result of suicide at his Carrickfergus home on 6 January 2020.

== Career ==
=== Citybeat / Q Radio (2010–2019) ===
Clements' radio career started when he phoned Citybeat asking how could he be on the radio. Two weeks after sending in a demo tape, he was on the air.

Clements presented the Q Radio Breakfast Show until 21 June 2019 alongside Sara Neill and later Cate Conway on the commercial radio station. Rival presenter Stephen Nolan described Clements’ show as one of the most innovative and funny he had ever listened to. On leaving, he stated it's "never been anything less than a privilege" to host the show.

One segment of the show was Through the Window, a radio concept of Through the Keyhole. It featured Stephen talking with a character and allowing listeners to guess which celebrity or local face was the answer. It also gives comedic reference to ongoing political issues. He credits his wife for coming up with the idea, following a chat they had on holiday.

During this time he also wrote a best-selling book, Back In Our Day, released on 15 November 2017.

=== BBC (2019–2020) ===
In September 2019, Clements announced he got "the job of a lifetime" and joined BBC Radio Ulster. His show, The Stephen Clements Show, replaced The Sean Coyle Show. His first show was broadcast on 23 September and his last show was on 6 January.

He also co-presented the TV series Open for Summer during the Open Golf Championship in Portrush in 2019 as well as BBC Northern Ireland's Children in Need programme in November 2019 with Holly Hamilton.

Clements was posthumously added to the 2021 Irish Music Rights Organisation Radio Awards Hall of Fame on 16 September 2021.
