= Marc Mallett =

Northern Irish journalist and broadcaster

Marc Mallett (b. Belfast) is a Northern Irish broadcaster and journalist. He was a newsreader and reporter at UTV, and the Northern Ireland correspondent for ITV News.

== Broadcasting career ==
Mallett began his broadcasting career on the hospital radio station at the Royal Victoria Hospital, Belfast. He went on to work for Belfast CityBeat for ten years, initially as a volunteer and eventually becoming News Editor at the station.

During his time at UTV, Mallett contributed to Late and Live and The Seven Thirty Show. He was previously a continuity announcer and also presented in-vision weather forecasts for the station.

In 2007, Mallett was the recipient of the Radio News Broadcaster of the Year at the CIPR Press and Broadcast Awards. He received a finalist's certificate in the category of Best News Anchor/Reporter (Local) at the New York Festivals Radio Broadcasting Awards, where Belfast Tonight also received a Bronze World Medal in the category of Best News Magazine.

== Personal life ==
Mallett attended Campbell College, Belfast, and later studied at Belfast Metropolitan College.

Mallett has conducted charity work with Cinemagic and the Alzheimer's Society. He lives in Belfast.
