= Johnny Hero =

Radio DJ, musician and football coach from Belfast, Northern Ireland

- Born: John Patrick Cullen; 1 January 1961 (age 64); Belfast, Northern Ireland
- Occupations: Singer; songwriter; drummer; disc jockey; radio host; football coach
- Years active: 1977–present
- Spouses: Lisa Cullen (1999-present)
- Children: Rebecca and John
- Musical career
- Genres: Punk; New Wave; rock; punk rock; reggae
- Instruments: Vocals; drums
- Labels: Shock Rock; Spit Records
- Website: www.u105.com/on-air/drive/

John Patrick Cullen (born 1 January 1961), known professionally as Johnny Hero, is a radio DJ, musician and football coach from Belfast, Northern Ireland.

Hero has been a drummer and vocalist for the Ex-Producers since 1979. He is also a singer for GlamSlam. Since February 1990 he has been a radio presenter, having started on a pirate radio station, he moved to Downtown Radio and presented there for 20 years. He left Downtown and joined U105, where he has run the Drivetime show from 2010.

== Personal life ==
Hero has a younger sister, Linda Cullen (born 1967) who is also a co-presenter at U105, and two brothers, Patrick and Paul.

Hero has been married to Lisa Cullen since 1999. They met through Hero's sister Linda. They have two children together, Rebecca and John.

Away from his musical career, Hero volunteers as a football coach for Carryduff Colts.

== Music career ==
=== Early career ===
Hero got into the industry in 1977, soon after DJing for his local community centre in place of a group of nuns. He has been a DJ in many clubs across Belfast, including Limelight.

=== Ex-Producers (1978–1982, 2004–) ===
Hero was in The Producers in 1978 and 1979. The band consisted of Henry Savage (vocals), Brendan McGarrigle (guitar), Tom Condon (guitar), Joe Donnelly (bass) and Hero (drums). Hero and Donnelly had previously been in a band called Blitz together. Donnelly was replaced by Dee Moore and McGarrigle left and the quartet carried on as the Ex-Producers from late 1979 to 1982. The Ex-Producers recorded a four-song session for Downtown Radio in October 1979. They appeared on BBC performing "Newer Wave '79". Savage left and Hero took over vocals as well as drumming. The trio recorded for the album Shock Rock in 1980. The band recorded another live set for the BBC in 1981. In 1982 the band split. They have since reformed in the 2004, with Norman Boyd, Billy Causby, Petesy Burns and Gordie Walker joining Hero. Dermo Wilson and Steven Donnelly joined in 2014. They are currently signed to Spit Records, and have new releases scheduled with the 4 A.D. label in 2019.

==== Songs ====
- Loyalty (1979)
- Newer Wave '79 (1979)
- P-Check (1979)
- Hole in the Head (1979)
- Behind the Door (1980)
- The System is Here (1980)
- "No Complaints" won the BBC "Best Songwriter of The Year Award" in 1981.

=== 10 Past 7 and Hi-Rise (1981–1983) ===
Following the disbandment of the Ex-Producers, Hero was in 10 Past 7, with Bap Kennedy and Brian Kennedy prior to the band's break in 1983. He was also in a reggae band, Hi-Rise, which played between 1981 and 1982.

=== GlamSlam (1980s–present) ===
Hero became the singer of GlamSlam, with Henry Cluney (guitar), Billy Blackcloud (bass) and Gordie Walker (drums). Cluney left and Norman Boyd is now the guitarist.

==== Songs ====
- The Leader!!! (1991)
- Tell Him (1991)
- Coz I Luv You (1991)
- Hi Ho Northern Ireland (2007)
- Live Album "How Much More Live Can It Be?"

== Radio career ==
Johnny Hero got started in radio in 1990 when his sister spotted an advert on Ceefax for a pirate radio station in Monaghan. The pair both sent demos to the station and subsequently got jobs there.

He went on to work at Downtown Radio between the 1990s and 2010. In 2010, Hero alongside fellow presenters Dougi Marshall and Robert Skates were taking part in a Downtown Radio charity fundraiser when the boat they were on sank off the Antrim coast, with the three presenters as well as three crew members needing to be rescued. The rescue operation took four and a half hours. Hero stated the station didn't give support after the incident and left Downtown, moving to U105.

He has presented the Drivetime show on U105 since 2010, including Johnny Hero's Minute to Win It and The Golden Years, as well as The Film Review with his sister Linda Cullen.

In December 2023, seven of U105s presenters, including Hero, took industrial tribunal action against the station.

== Millionaire incident ==
Hero appeared on Who Wants to Be a Millionaire? in 2007. He was knocked out on £64,000, while answering the £125,000 question, which meant he left with £32,000. However, the question asked, "Who was on the throne when Robert Walpole became Britain's first prime minister?" had a debatable answer as some historians argue Robert Walpole never actually held the title of prime minister. Despite asking to come back on, the producers refused, despite the fact Laurence Llewelyn-Bowen was allowed back on in similar circumstances.

== Awards ==
- Hot Press Awards for his "Indie" show on Downtown (x3)
- Radio Presenter Of The Year by Industry magazine "X-Trax"
