= Goldbeat =

Former AM radio station in Northern Ireland

Cookstown; Northern Ireland
- Frequency: 828 kHz

Ownership
- Owner: Owen Oyston

History
- First air date: 1995
- Last air date: 1999
- Former names: Townland Radio (1995–1997)

Goldbeat was an AM radio station broadcasting on 828 kHz in Cookstown, Northern Ireland. It was launched in 1995 as Townland Radio, but was purchased in 1997 by media tycoon Owen Oyston who had already bought and relaunched Belfast Community Radio in 1996 (now Belfast CityBeat). The Oyston group relaunched Townland Radio as Goldbeat 828, but the station folded in 1999 along with sister station Heartbeat 1521 AM (formerly Radio 1521) in Craigavon. Both AM licences were handed back to the then UK regulator The Radio Authority (now Ofcom). At the time only one other radio licence in the UK had ever been handed back to the regulator.

After years of campaigning by locals for the re-advertising of a radio licence for Mid-Ulster, Ofcom awarded an FM licence for the area to Belfast CityBeat (now owned by CN group) in 2002. Belfast CityBeat launched Mid FM from the same premises previously occupied by Townland Radio/Goldbeat at Park Avenue, Cookstown in County Tyrone. In 2006 Belfast Citybeat sold their majority stake in Mid FM to Northern Media, owners of 7FM in Ballymena.

Mid FM was rebranded to 6FM in 2006 and changed name again to Q106/7 FM in November 2011.

== Sources ==
- Radio Transdiffusion
- BBC News
