= Maurice Jay =

British DJ

- Occupations: Radio Presenter, Music Producer, Musician, Actor
- Known for: Radio, TV

Maurice Jay is a radio and television personality in Northern Ireland. He is currently the Programme Controller for U105, a Belfast-based radio station that is part of the Wireless Group. Jay played lead roles in over 100 UK-wide performances of West Side Story by Leonard Bernstein. He was included in the Sound of 2008 and 2011 panels at the BBC.

== Education ==
Jay was born in Holywood, Northern Ireland and attended Sullivan Upper School there. He was awarded a diploma in Sound Technology & Music Business from New York University.

== Music ==
In the mid-1980s Jay began club DJing and held down various residencies and regular guest appearances in venues around the country which included Radio Top Shop and a weekly residency at The Bronx (nite club), one of the country's leading dance music venues, where he was a local pioneer of Chicago House. In 1989 he was a Northern Ireland finalist in the DMC World DJ Championships and was one of the first DJ's to employ samplers and sequencers, making live real-time remixes of tracks during DJing sets.

In 1990, Jay started as a professional sound engineer at Sonopista Studios in Almería, Spain, one of the country's first all digital recording studios. He also worked as a live touring front of house (FOH) engineer for the company's PA hire division, working with Chick Corea on his 1990 Inside Out Tour. From there, he moved to New York, working at Jonathan Elias Associates Recording Studios. Jay returned to Northern Ireland in the mid-1990s to take up the post of resident FOH engineer at The Empire Music Hall. His live engineering work has included mixing radio sessions for artists such as the Grammy Award-winning Amy Winehouse, former Marillion frontman Fish, Brit Award nominee Nerina Pallot, and the multi-million album selling bands T'Pau and Hue & Cry to name but a few.

Jay worked as a music columnist for The Irish News, citing meeting Prince at his Paisley Park Studios in Minneapolis as a highlight. During his time running record label and artist management company Cherry Moon, Jay composed and produced albums for several artists including girl band Honey; he directed music videos for Trina Be and remixed and directed the video for UK Top 10 dance chart hit Fairytale for Curb Records. In 2000, he was also instrumental in the foundation of a government backed sectoral lead body for the Northern Irish music industry.

In the early 1990s Jay formed a funk rock band called The Behaviour; the band achieved national media exposure, as they appeared on BBC2's Dance NRG hosted by Normski, and performed several times on the BBC/RTE all Ireland TV show Go For It. In September 2009, Maurice Jay formed an 80s Tribute band called The Pleasuredome with former members of The Behaviour; they debuted in a popular local club in Belfast in February 2010.

== Broadcasting work ==
As a young teenager, Jay hosted school discos and presented his first radio shows on Ulster Hospital Radio. In the early nineties, he began work with Belfast Community Radio, before moving to Downtown Radio where he hosted various mainline shows before joining Belfast CityBeat in 2000 as Breakfast Show host. In 2005 he joined UTV as Head of Music for their new radio station U105 and in May 2008 he took up the position of Programme Controller. He currently also hosts Breakfast at U105 and produces / presents The NI Golf Podcast.

== Acting and television ==
Jay played the lead role of Danny Zuko in a UK touring production of Grease and appeared alongside James Nesbitt and Conleth Hill in West Side Story. He also starred as Riff, the leader of The Jets, in a later production of same musical with Opera Northern Ireland and the Ulster Orchestra. He has appeared in over 100 performances of this Leonard Bernstein classic and in 2008 completed another sellout run at the Grand Opera House, Belfast, playing Lieutenant Schrank.

His TV appearances have included ITV network show Flux, network BBC2's Dance NRG, RTÉ/BBC Go For It (GFI) and UTV's L8 & Live. He has also made numerous appearances as a talking head and music pundit in news programmes and documentaries.

== Charity work ==
Jay has undertaken charity work to raise awareness for the Northern Ireland Hospice; this entailed endurance challenges where he lived in a shop window in Belfast City Centre for more than nine days, and in September 2011 visited 105 towns and villages on a bed. To date U105 has raised over £1,000,000 for the charity.
