= Pete Snodden =

Northern Irish radio host (born 1980)

- Born: 11 June 1980 (age 46); Bangor, Northern Ireland
- Education: RBAI, University of Ulster
- Occupation: Radio presenter
- Years active: 1999– present
- Spouse: Julia Snodden (m. 2007)
- Children: 2
- Website: http://www.petesnodden.co.uk/

Peter Scott Snodden (born 11 June 1980) is a radio host on Cool FM from Bangor, Northern Ireland.

== Personal life ==
Snodden is the son of Irene and Jackie Snodden (c1929-2014). Snodden met his future wife at the University of Ulster in Coleraine in 2000 and proposed on the London Eye in 2006. He is married to Julia Snodden and together they have two daughters. He plays hockey for his hometown, Bangor and enjoys playing football and golf. He is also an ambassador for The Unite Against Hate Campaign, The Prince's Trust and Action Cancer. In 2012, he carried the Olympic torch for the 2012 Olympics.

== Career ==
From 1999 until 2011 Pete was involved with Cool FM's specialist music output and hosted various dance music programmes. Snodden began hosting The Pete Snodden Breakfast Show on Cool FM in 2004. The show ran until 2 November 2012, ending as Snodden wanted to spend mornings with his daughter and the fact he needed a new challenge as his show had set numerous records while it was on air. Snodden hosted Snodden Show on Cool FM which is in the afternoons from 1pm to 4pm while the Breakfast Show was hosted by Gareth Stewart and Connor Phillips. Snodden returned to the Breakfast Show in 2014 after the departure of Connor Phillips. Snodden hosts the show from 6am to 10am along with Paulo Ross and Rebecca McKinney. The show is now called Pete Snodden in the Morning.

== Awards ==
His programme, The Source, won the Most Informative Media award at the 2006 NI Dance Music Awards. He was also Media Personality of the Year at the 2008 FATE Awards and Media Personality of the Year at the GO Awards 2009. In addition, Snodden was also nominated as a finalist at the 2008 Ulster Tatler People of the Year Awards in the category of Celebrity of the Year but lost out to actor James Nesbitt.

Year	Award	Category	Result	Ref.
2006	NI Dance Music Awards	Most Informative Media	Won	
2008	FATE Awards	Media Personality of the Year	Won	
2008	Ulster Tatler People of the Year Awards	Celebrity of the Year	Won	
2009	GO Awards	Media Personality of the Year	Won	
