= Keith Law (comedian) =

British actor

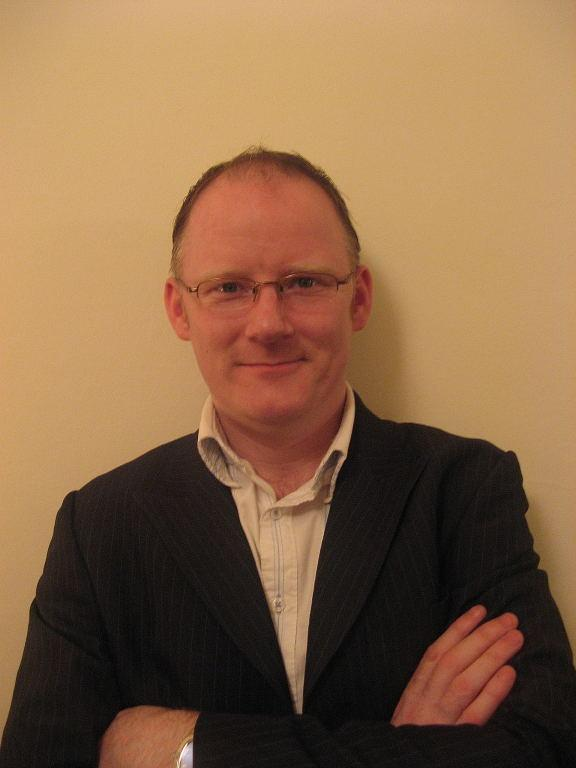
Keith Law

Keith Law is a British actor, director, and musician from Northern Ireland, best known for some success as an actor in Just for Laughs, a BBC1/Paramount Comedy a 2003 BBC NI hidden camera show produced by Wild Rover Productions. He also served as a director for Just for Laughs.

On Just for Laughs, Law plays a variety of "set-up" positions in order to coax passers-by to participate in the scene. He often acts as a bespectacled policeman or traffic warden.

== Previous work ==
Previously, Law was a musician and composer in the Irish band Devlin Law. The band released two singles: “River Of Love” and “Count on Me.” Keith later joined the Supreme Pontiffs who were the studio band on the PK Tonight show in 1995, presented by Patrick Kielty, where they were known for their slapstick approach and trademark costumes. The Supreme Pontiffs were also the Band for 3 series of The Lyrics Board on the Irish National Broadcaster RTÉ, fronted by Linda Martin.

== Other work ==
Keith Law was behind a re-write of the Simon and Garfunkel hit "Mrs. Robinson" back in January 2010, which was uploaded to YouTube. Based on The Iris Robinson and Kirk McCamley affair, it became an overnight success on YouTube with almost 250,000 views in the first week it was up.

Keith Law is also the commercial producer at Belfast Radio station Belfast Citybeat. Here, he created the sketch JonJoe Sat Nav, that became an Internet meme. In 2007, Law received a PANI Award (the One that Got Away Gold award, from the Publicity Association of Northern Ireland) for the sketch.

Keith's ad production often relies on credo stereotypes such as one advert for usedcarsni.com where he satirised the voice of a rural person to advertise a car search engine. These included a grand prix advertising award for Northern Ireland from radio-awards.net. Keith also scooped a silver in the New York Festivals for his creation "Stuart and Web's Halloween Tale", a satirical comedy piece with a Halloween theme, which originally aired on Citybeat Halloween 2008. Currently, Keith Law’s voice can be heard just before every hour on Belfast Citybeat announcing ”it’s almost 3 o clock, time to Fonacab.”

== Personal life ==
Law met his wife, Sonia Butterworth, on the Just for Laughs show, where they were co-actors. They now have a son together called Liam.
