= North West Region Waste Management Group =

The North West Region Waste Management Group (NWRWMG) is the collection of local authorities in the northwest of Northern Ireland responsible for municipal waste management services, including recycling. The local authorities include:

1. Ballymoney Borough Council
2. Coleraine Borough Council
3. Derry City Council
4. Limavady Borough Council
5. Magherafelt District Council
6. Moyle District Council
7. Strabane District Council

== See also ==
- ARC21
- SWaMP
