= Castle FM =

Carrickfergus, Country Antrim; Northern Ireland
- Frequencies: FM: Unknown usually 107.2 MHz; Online

Programming
- Format: News, music

History
- First air date: June 1998 (as Radio Carrickfergus) June 2002 (as Castle FM)
- Last air date: August 2005

Links
- Website: Official Castle FM Website

Castle FM is a currently inactive (as of August 2012) short-term radio station based in Carrickfergus, County Antrim, Northern Ireland.

The radio station transmitted twice annually between 1998-2005 and after a six-year break returned in July 2011.

Castle FM broadcasts a mixture of music, news and information for a potential audience of over 50,000 adults in the East Antrim area.

== Background ==
Carrickfergus got its first taste of local radio on Monday 1 June 1998 when the tones of Eddie West welcomed Carrickfergus to the sound of 'Radio Carrickfergus'.

Radio Carrickfergus was a two-week trial broadcast provided by 'Galax' and funded by Carrickfergus Borough Council to provide coverage of the town's Waterfront Festival.

A small caravan on the 'Castle Green' at the foot of Carrick's 12th-century Norman Castle gave home to presenters on the first day including Paul Buckle (now BBC NI), Stuart Robinson (now Cool FM /Downtown), Ricky K (now Citybeat), Natasha Sayee (now BBC NI) and Eddie West (now Cool FM / Downtown).

The station returned in December 1998, June 1999 and December 1999. All these broadcasts were made from the Knightride Centre on Antrim Street (now museum and civic centre).

In March 2000, Carrickfergus Borough Council appointed Belfast radio station Belfast CityBeat to provide the service and local radio presenter Stuart Robinson took over as Station Manager.

In 2000, the station relocated to a more suitable location at the time in the town's DeCourcy Centre and rebranded to Vibe FM which launched at 9 am on 9 June 2000.

In April 2002, Vibe FM ran a competition with the Carrick Times to pick a new name for the radio station which would soon be relaunching.

Eventually 'Castle FM' was created as was Stuart Robinson's new concept 'Young Star Search'.

The result was a huge boost for the station which went on to attract a record response from listeners and gain awards.

Castle FM launched at 9 am on 31 May 2002 and ran to 27 June 2002. The first song played was "Walking On Sunshine" by Katrina And The Waves.

Citybeat provided the Castle FM for the last time in 2004; however, Stuart Robinson launched 'The New Castle FM' as a private venture the following year. The station started at 9 am on 12 August 2005 and enjoyed success.

Soon afterwards, Robinson moved away from RSL radio to concentrate on developing his Young Star Search format across Northern Ireland which successfully ran on Belfast Citybeat until his defection to Cool FM and Downtown Radio in 2010.

In 2011, it was announced that 'The New Castle FM' would be returning following a six-year break and once again supported by Carrickfergus Borough Council, however David McCammond is now listed as the new licence holder of the service. Robinson continues to retain copyright to the name and Young Star Search format but is no longer involved in their operation at this time.

On 4 July 2011 at 9 am, Robinson brought 'The New Castle FM' back to life with Starship's "Nothing's Gonna Stop Us Now"; the station enjoyed success over the following two weeks attracting interviews with members of the local community and even Siva from 'The Wanted' called to show his support.

It is not yet known when the station will return to the airwaves.

== Notes ==
Other RSL radio stations operate in the Carrickfergus area - these are not affiliated or associated in any way with 'The New Castle FM'.
