= Radio 1521 =

Radio 1521 (later Heartbeat 1521) was a radio station based in County Armagh, Northern Ireland from 1996 to 1999. The station broadcast from Craigavon and covered much of mid-Ulster.

The station launched in 1996 before being bought by Belfast station Belfast CityBeat in 1998 and rebranded to "Heartbeat 1521". At the end of 1998, with 9,000 listeners per week, it was one of the two smallest commercial broadcasters in the UK. The station and its sister station Goldbeat 828 ceased broadcasts on 22 May 1999.

== See also ==
- Belfast CityBeat
