= Radio Sputnik (Finland) =

Coordinates: 60°12′30″N 25°4′58.5″E

- Finland
- Broadcast area: Areas along the E18
- Frequencies: Helsinki: 106.9 MHz; Porvoo: 107.6 MHz; Kotka: 107.2 MHz; Imatra: 102.1 MHz; Lappeenranta: 102.1 MHz

Programming
- Language: Russian

Ownership
- Owner: Radio Satellite Finland Oy

History
- First air date: September 21, 1999

Links
- Webcast: MP3
- Website: www.radiosputnik.fi

Radio Sputnik was a Finnish radio station with programming in the Russian language. The station ceased broadcasting in 2018.
