= Southern Waste Management Partnership =

Before disbanding in 2015, the Southern Waste Management Partnership (SWaMP) coordinated the disposal and handling of municipal waste, including recycling, in the South of Northern Ireland. The local authorities that were covered by SWaMP (before local government in Northern Ireland was re-organised in 2015) included:

1. Armagh City and District Council
2. Banbridge District Council
3. Cookstown District Council
4. Craigavon Borough Council
5. Dungannon and South Tyrone Borough Council
6. Fermanagh District Council
7. Newry and Mourne District Council

SWaMP's key task was to establish a 20-year waste disposal contract for the region's future waste management requirements.

== See also ==
- ARC21
- NWRWMG
