= Belfast Community Radio =

Former community radio station in Northern Ireland

Belfast Community Radio (BCR)
- Belfast; Northern Ireland

History
- First air date: April 6, 1990
- Last air date: September 30, 1996

Belfast Community Radio or BCR, was a radio station that broadcast to Belfast between 1990 and 1996. The station broadcast from the basement of Russell Court Complex on Belfast's Lisburn Road. It was replaced by Belfast CityBeat.

== History ==
BCR was launched at 7:30 a.m. on 6 April 1990 with Rick Nugent who was the first presenter, the first song was "Feet of a Dancer" by Maira O'Connell.

In 1992, in attempt to boost audience the station adopted a 'Classic Hits Format' and became known as Classic Trax BCR but by 1994 had reverted to 96.7 BCR.

In 1995, the word 'community' in the title was replaced for 'city' in a further attempt to distance the station from its community roots which had failed to interest audience.

During its final month on air the station simply became known as 96.7FM.

BCR struggled to establish a listener base and was eventually relaunched as Belfast CityBeat in 1996. In contrast with its forerunner, Citybeat became a huge success and is now one of the most popular stations in Northern Ireland.

Stuart Robinson presented the final programme on BCR on 30 September 1996. The last track played was Elton John and "Sacrifice". At midnight BCR changed to Citybeat. In 2025, it is known as Q Radio Belfast.

At the time of its demise, BCR was pulling in little over 30,000 listeners.

== Former presenters ==
BCR presenters prior to the 1996 relaunch included Rick Nugent, Maurice Jay, Mary Johnston, Eddie McDermott, Davy Cunningham, Stuart Robinson, Owen Beers, Mal Reynolds, Noel Hyndman, Beth Walker(nee Andrews), Phil Doyle, Lawrence John, David Johnston, Lisa Flavelle, Olive Melville, Kenny Tosh, Paul Orr, Ricky K, Stephen Nolan, Denise Watson and Davy Cash Bob Huggins.
