= ARC21 =

Government body in Northern Ireland

arc21 is an umbrella waste management group in Northern Ireland representing 6 councils on the eastern coast. It was established in 2003 and formally incorporated in 2004 following a process of increasing co-operation amongst its constituent councils.

It was the first such Waste Management Group of its kind to be established in the UK and operates within the framework of a legally binding collaborative agreement between all of its councils.

It was formed in accordance with the (then) Department of the Environment's 'Northern Ireland Waste Management Strategy' at that time which promoted the concept of a joint approach between councils in geographical sub-regions across Northern Ireland.

At its heart is the development and maintenance of the Waste Management Plan. This sets the strategic blueprint for waste management throughout the arc21 region and it is from this that the work of arc21 flows. It provides a roadmap for the services and facilities which the partner councils are likely to need, along with a timetable. arc21 play a pivotal role in ensuring its partner councils progress with delivering the plan, particularly in respect of these major projects and initiatives.

At a similar time to local government reform, the Department of Agriculture, Environment and Rural Affairs (DAERA) replaced the Department of the Environment (DOE) and retains responsibility for the policy with which the councils’ Waste Management Plans must be compliant.

The arc21 waste management region includes:

Antrim and Newtownabbey Borough Council
Ards and North Down Borough Council
Belfast City Council
Lisburn and Castlereagh City Council
Mid and East Antrim Borough Council
Newry, Mourne and Down District Council

== See also ==
- North West Region Waste Management Group
- Southern Waste Management Partnership
