= Bangor FM =

Northern Ireland
- Broadcast area: Bangor, County Down
- Frequency: 107.9 FM

Programming
- Format: News, Music

Ownership
- Sister stations: Lisburn's 98FM FM105

History
- First air date: 2004
- Former frequencies: 107.2, 106.3

Links
- Webcast: TuneIn
- Website: Official Website

Bangor FM was a local radio station based in Bangor, County Down and broadcasting to the greater Bangor area. The station broadcast a varied mixture of music, news, interviews and community information to a catchment area of over 60,000 adults in the North Down area.

Bangor FM ceased broadcasting at 5.11pm on Thursday 27 June 2024 due to financial difficulties.

== Affiliation ==
Bangor FM is affiliated with sister stations FM105 and Lisburn's 98FM. It is also supported by the South Eastern Regional College, which provides studio and production space. SERC provides a route of access to the station for students interested in the media field.

== Licence ==
Bangor FM holds a community radio licence, issued by Ofcom. Prior to 2011, it operated on a RSL short-term licence.

== Young Star Search ==
Young Star Search run on Bangor FM in 2004, then as a stand-alone event in 2005 and then back on Bangor FM in 2006. In 2007 the Bangor Young Star Search ran as a part of a bigger contest on Belfast CityBeat.
