= U105 =

Radio station in Belfast

- Belfast; Northern Ireland
- Broadcast area: Northern Ireland
- Frequencies: FM: 105.8 MHz (Belfast); DAB: 12D (Bauer NI)
- RDS: U105

Programming
- Format: AC/talk

Ownership
- Owner: News UK Broadcasting Ltd; (News UK)

History
- First air date: 14 November 2005

Links
- Webcast: www.u105.com/player/
- Website: www.u105.com

U105 is a Belfast, Northern Ireland, based radio station, providing a mix of music and speech as well as hourly news bulletins. It is owned by News Broadcasting and was launched at 6am on 14 November 2005.

U105 broadcasts on 105.8 FM in Belfast and surrounding area, from studios at City Quays 2. Programmes are transmitted on FM from the Black Mountain transmitting station, located a few miles to the west of Belfast. The station also broadcasts throughout Northern Ireland on DAB and online. In the Q3 2021 RAJAR survey, the station had 217,000 weekly listeners, with total weekly hours of 2,102,000 (higher than its rival Downtown Radio, which had 64,000 more weekly listeners). At 9.69, the station had the highest weekly hours per listener among its main local commercial rivals (Cool FM, Downtown Radio, Downtown Country and Q Radio).

As of June 2026, the station broadcasts to a weekly audience of 208,041, according to RAJAR.

In December 2023, seven of U105s presenters took industrial tribunal action against the station, listed as Elizabeth (Linda) Cullen, John Patrick Cullen (Johnny Hero), David Anthony Johnson, Andrew (Jerry) Lang, Angela Denise Scott, Carolyn Ann Stewart, and Stephen Woods. Jerry Lang subsequently left U105.
