= Q Radio Belfast =

Radio station in Northern Ireland

- Belfast; Northern Ireland
- Broadcast area: Greater Belfast on FM & Northern Ireland on DAB

Programming
- Format: Adult Contemporary/Top 40
- Network: Q Radio Network

Ownership
- Owner: Northern Media Group

History
- First air date: 6 April 1990
- Former names: Citybeat; Belfast CityBeat

Technical information
- Power: 600 watts (96.7)

Links
- Website: Official Website

Q Radio (formerly known as Citybeat and Belfast CityBeat) is a Northern Irish radio station. The station is part of the Q Radio Network.

It broadcasts to Greater Belfast on 96.7 MHz FM and on DAB Digital Radio across all of Northern Ireland since summer 2015. The station is based at the Fountain Centre in Belfast city centre.

From 5 April 2007, Citybeat became available on 102.5FM for North Belfast, Newtownabbey and Carrickfergus. On 2 November 2007, Citybeat launched a third FM transmitter also broadcasting on 102.5FM for Bangor.

Citybeat reaches a weekly audience of 127,000 listeners in Belfast, around 22% of the adult population. It has won both Arqiva 'Station of the Year' and Sony Awards. The station was rebranded as Q Radio on-air at 6pm on Sunday 9 August 2015.

== Young Star Search ==
From 2007 to 2010, the radio station was the home of the Young Star Search, Northern Ireland's biggest ever talent search for young people.

== Awards and nominations ==
Citybeat has won more Sony Radio Academy Awards than any other commercial radio station in Northern Ireland along with a number of other top awards. Recent awards include:

- Stephen Nolan Sony Gold 2002
- Stephen Nolan Sony Gold x2 2003
- Stephen Nolan Sony Gold x2 2004 + Sony Silver
- NTL Station of the Year 2003
- Stephen Nolan - Best presenter Irish Entertainment Awards 2003
- Joe Ferguson - Best presenter Irish Entertainment Awards 2004
- Mark & Dave - Best Irish Breakfast Show Irish Entertainment Awards 2006
- Marc Mallett IPR Award - News Broadcaster of the Year 2007
- Keith Law PANI Award - for JONJOE SAT NAV spoof The One That Got Away / Production Award 2007
- Leroy Allen - City Beat - Lancashire - Preston
- Irish radio station of the year - Irish Entertainment Awards 2007
- Bronse New York Festival - News Programme 'Belfast Tonight' 2007
- Arqiva UK Commercial Radio Station of the Year 2007
- Stuart Robinson P&M Awards Nomination 2007
- Stuart Robinson Arqiva UK Commercial Radio Awards Nomination 2008
- Stuart Robinson & Work Experience Boy - Best presenter Irish Entertainment Awards 2008
- Stuart Robinson Belfast Awards Nomination 2008
- Keith Law VOX Award Highly commended- Use of Humour 2008–09
- Keith Law VOX Award Highly Commended- Best newcomer 2008–09
- Keith Law Radio-Awards.net Best in category 2009
- Keith Law Radio-Awards.net Grand Prix Northern Ireland 2009
- Stuart Robinson Arqiva UK Commercial Radio Awards Nomination 2009
- Belfast Tonight - Silver Award 'Best News Programme' New York Festival 2009
- Keith Law, Stuart Robinson and Work Experience Boy - Silver Award 'Best Comedy Feature' New York Festival 2009
- Stuart Robinson - Gold Award 'Best Station Promotion' New York Festival 2009

== Affiliates ==
Under the ownership of Owen Oyston, CityBeat had a couple of short lived affiliate stations on AM, namely Goldbeat 828 (formerly Townland Radio) in Cookstown, and Heartbeat 1521 (formerly Radio 1521) in Craigavon. Citybeat handed back the licences to the Radio Authority just two years after buying the stations due to lack of commercial viability. Heartbeat was on the air from 1996 to 1999 and Goldbeat broadcast between 1995 and 1999. The licence for Craigavon has to date never been re-advertised however Cookstown was re-advertised on FM in 2002 and was granted back to Citybeat (by then under new ownership of CN group) in February 2003 Mid FM was launched as the local radio station for Mid-Ulster (from the same building and studio as Townland/Goldbeat broadcast). In 2006 Citybeat sold the station to Northern Media (owners of Ballymena 7fm); they rebranded the station to Six FM.

From 2000 to 2004, Citybeat also broadcast restricted service licence (RSL) stations Castle FM in Carrickfergus and Bangor FM in Bangor to support local festivals. In August 2000 Citybeat also provided Fast FM in Irvinestown as a trial broadcast for the pending commercial licence for Omagh and Enniskillen. The licence was later awarded to Q Network Radios Q101.2.

== BCR (1990–1996) ==
Prior to its relaunch in 1996, Citybeat was known as BCR or Belfast Community Radio, a community focused station which failed to attract listener interest. BCR launched at 7.30am on 6 April 1990 and managed to stay on the air for six years. BCR presenters prior to the 1996 relaunch included Rick Nugent, Maurice Jay, Mal Reynolds, Kenny Tosh Stuart Robinson, Phil Doyle, Paul Orr and Stephen Nolan. At the time of its demise, BCR was pulling in little over 30,000 listeners. Stuart Robinson was the last presenter on BCR when it switched to Citybeat at midnight on 30 September 1996. Citybeat officially launched on 1 October 1996. The first show was the new breakfast show presented by Dave Stephens and Caroline Bartley.

The station broadcast from the basement of Russell Court Complex on Belfast's Lisburn Road. In 1997 (as Citybeat) the station moved to Stranmillis before moving in 2006 to Ormeau Road.

Rick Nugent was the first presenter on BCR who launched the station with "Maira O'Connell" and "Feet of a Dancer". Nugent left when Citybeat started in 1996 but returned as Nolan's replacement in 2003 before leaving again in 2005.

== General station information ==
- Q Radio's FM transmitters are based on the Black Mountain transmitting station for 96.7 FM, Carnmoney Hill for 102.5 FM in Newtownabbey and Bryansburn Road, Bangor Town Centre for 102.5 FM in North Down. Programmes are broadcast from modern studios located on the Ormeau Road close to Belfast city centre.
- From October 2001, Q Radio has been available on the Northern Ireland Digital Multiplex - giving the station province wide coverage. The 6 digital transmitter sites are Black Mountain (Greater Belfast), Colinward (North Belfast/South East Antrim), Limavady (North Coast), Sheriffs Mountain (Londonderry / North West), Strabane (The West) and Brougher Mountain (Fermanagh and Tyrone).
- Q Radio's newer transmitters both broadcast on 102.5 FM and deliver the station to areas previously sheltered by the Cavehill, such as North Belfast, Newtownabbey, Glengormley and Carrickfergus. Another transmitter also on 102.5 FM provides coverage for Bangor and North County Down.
- Q Radio's main 96.7 MHz FM transmitter on Black Mountain has a power output of 600W with mixed polarisation.

== Competition ==
Q Radio regularly attracts the largest market share of all commercial radio in the Belfast area. Its current audience is 144,000 listeners weekly in Belfast, however the station also attracts additional audience on FM outside Belfast, on DAB digital radio across Northern Ireland and online listening which is not included in this figure. (RAJAR fig. qrt03/09).

The local BBC station is BBC Radio Ulster. In addition all national BBC, RTÉ and UK/ROI national commercial stations can be received in Belfast. Some pirate stations (mainly operating along the Armagh border) along with a selection of regular RSL stations and four full-time community stations can also be heard in the Q Radio area. A selection of national digital stations are also available on the Northern Ireland DAB multiplex and Queen's University Student Radio in Belfast is broadcast on MW/AM.

== Notable past presenters ==
- Stuart Robinson: 1996–2010
- Marc Mallett: 1997–2007
- Maurice Jay: 1996–1997; 2001–2005
- Stephen Nolan: 1996–2003
- Rick Nugent: 1996, 2003–2005
- Ronan Kelly: 2003
- Christine Bleakley: 1996–1998
- Mal Reynolds: 1990–1996

== See also ==
- Q Radio Network
