= Q Radio Network =

Radio network in Northern Ireland

Q Radio
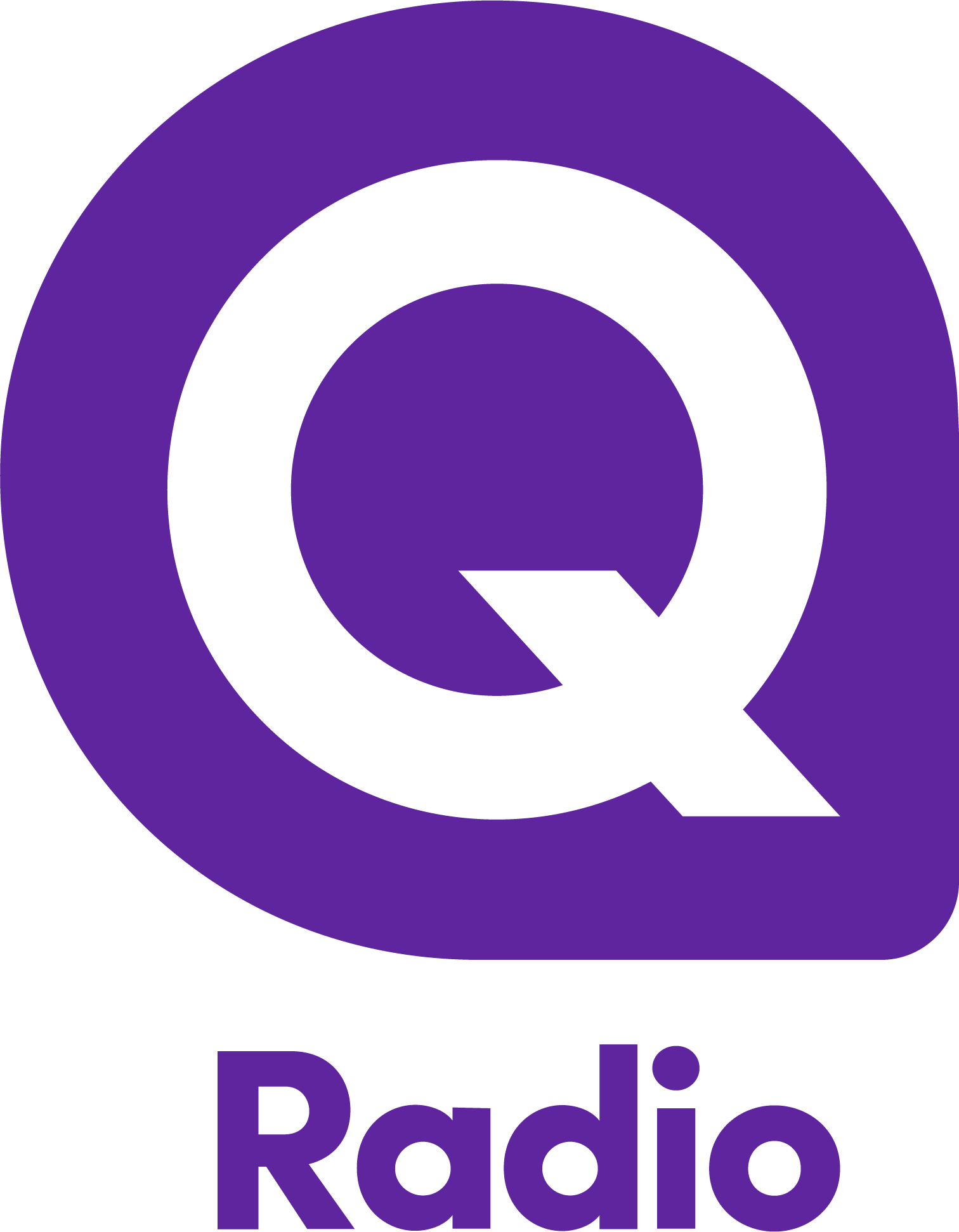
- Northern Ireland
- Broadcast area: Northern Ireland; Ireland
- Frequencies: DAB: 12D Bauer Northern Ireland; FM: 96.7 & 102.5 MHz Greater Belfast; 97.2 & 97.6 MHz North Coast; 100.5 MHz Newry; 101.1 MHz Kilkeel; 101.2 MHz Omagh; 102.1 MHz Enniskillen; 102.9 MHz North West; 106.0, 106.3 & 107.2 MHz Mid Ulster; 107.0 & 107.6 MHz Mid Antrim

Programming
- Format: Adult Contemporary

Ownership
- Owner: Northern Media Group

History
- First air date: 9 August 2015; 11 years ago

Links
- Webcast: Radioplayer
- Website: www.qradio.com

Q Radio is a network of seven Independent Local Radio stations in Northern Ireland airing an adult contemporary format. The network is the fifth most listened to radio station in Northern Ireland, with a combined figure of 320,000 listeners as of June 2026.

== Network ==
Q Radio covers seven licence areas:

- Belfast - 96.7 & 102.5 FM and DAB
- North West - 102.9 FM
- North Coast - 97.2 & 97.6 FM
- Mid Antrim - 107.0 & 107.6 FM
- Mid Ulster - 106.0, 106.3 & 107.2 FM
- Newry & Mourne - 100.5 FM & 101.1 FM
- Tyrone & Fermanagh - 101.2 & 102.1 FM

The various stations in the network previously had local opt-outs from the network schedule, including the Q Cafe on weekdays between 10 a.m. and 1 p.m. In 2020, there were no opt-outs on the schedule with all stations taking the network at all times, except for local news, traffic and advertising.

== History ==
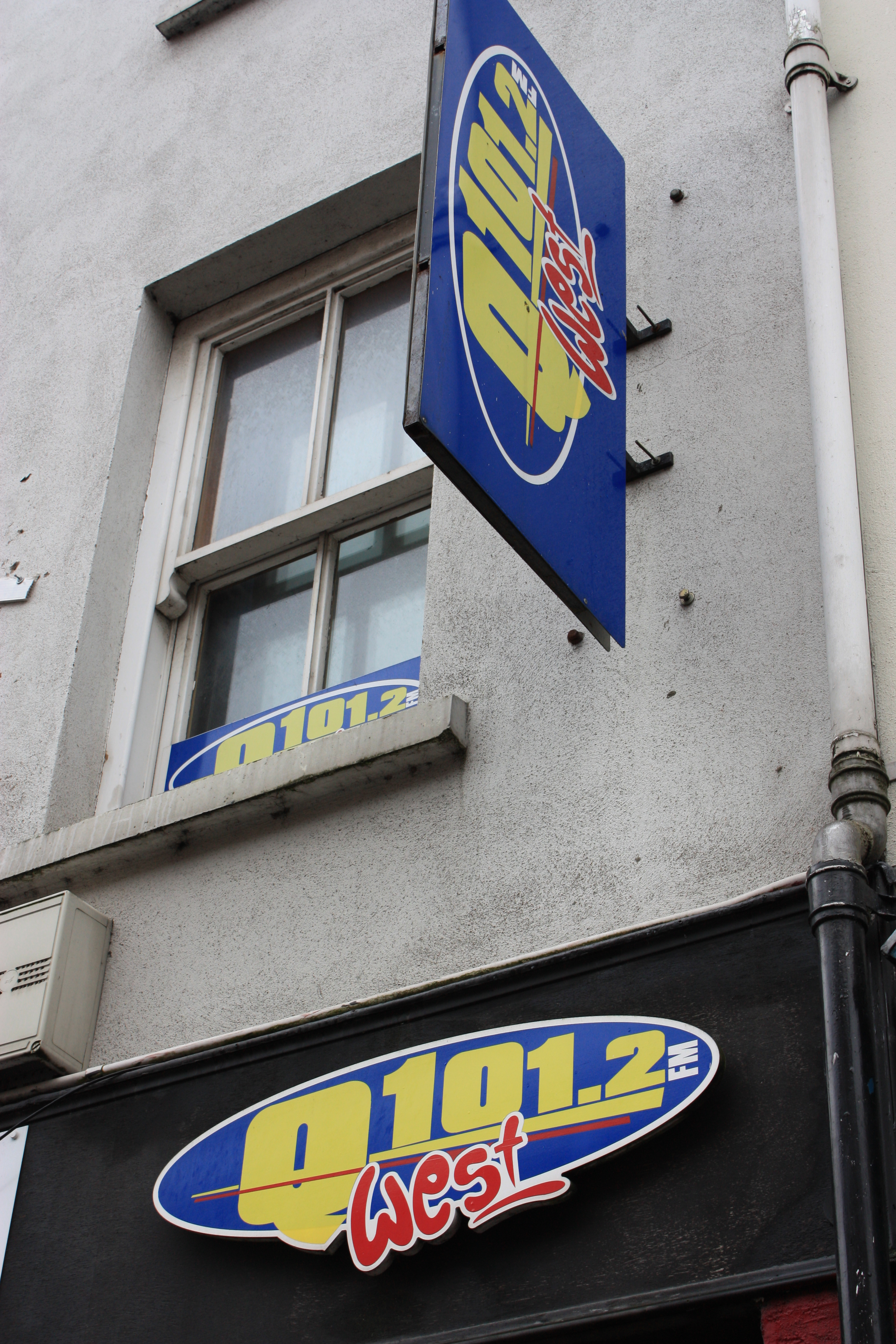
Former Q101.2 studios in Omagh

The first use of the Q brand in Northern Ireland came with the launch of Q102 in September 1993 from studios at the old railway station in the waterside of Derry city. Q97.2 from Coleraine, County Londonderry, on 26 January 2000. Additional stations were opened in Omagh, County Tyrone (Q101.2).

Further stations that would later become part of Q Radio launched in the mid-2000s. Seven FM launched on 1 November 2005 from its base in Ballymena., while Five FM won a licence to broadcast to Newry and Mourne on 100.5 MHz in 2006, signing on 12 December. That same year, River Media bought Mid 106 FM in Cookstown from CN Group and rebranded it as Six FM. In 2011, Five FM, Six FM and Seven FM were rebranded as Q Radio stations.

In 2015, Q Radio acquired Citybeat in Belfast from CN Group, marking its entry into that market. The station was then rebranded as Q Radio Belfast.

In 2017, "QHQ", the network's main studios, were opened in Belfast's Fountain Centre. A series of licence extensions in 2018 brought Q Radio additional coverage in Northern Ireland, including transmitters covering Larne, Newcastle, Draperstown, Enniskillen and Ballycastle.

== Notable former presenters ==
- Stephen Clements
- Declan Wilson
- Cate Conway

== See also ==
Belfast Community Radio
