= Cool FM =

Radio station in Belfast, Northern Ireland

- Newtownards; Northern Ireland
- Frequencies: DAB: 12D Bauer Northern Ireland; FM: 97.4 MHz Greater Belfast
- RDS: Cool_FM_

Programming
- Format: CHR
- Network: Hits Radio (for sales purposes)

Ownership
- Owner: Bauer Media Audio UK
- Sister stations: Downtown Radio; Downtown Country

History
- First air date: 7 February 1990 (36 years ago)

Links
- Webcast: Rayo
- Website: Cool FM

Cool FM is an Independent Local Radio station based in Newtownards, Northern Ireland. The station is owned and operated by Bauer and forms part of Bauer's Hits Radio Network.

The station began broadcasting in 1990 when its parent station Downtown Radio ceased simulcasting and split its AM and FM frequencies into two separate services. Downtown Radio continued on 1026 kHz AM and FM frequencies outside Belfast–and Cool FM was created to broadcast on 97.4 MHz. Initially broadcasting to the Greater Belfast area only, Cool FM can now be received across Northern Ireland on DAB.

As of December 2024, the station broadcasts to a weekly audience of 471,000, according to RAJAR.

== Programming ==
Cool FM plays a broad mix of popular, youth-orientated pop and dance music. Some of the stations most popular shows are Pete Snodden in the Morning with Pete, Paulo and Rebeeca and the Cool Saturday Show with Stuart Robinson and Deputy Dave. Cool FM features some specialised music such as Cool of Rock on weekday mornings, classic hits in The Cool Years on Sunday afternoons and Cool Goes Quiet, love songs on Sunday–Thursday nights.

Although station owner, Bauer Radio, packages Cool FM as part of the Hits Radio Network for selling advertising, Cool FM does not broadcast any Hits Radio networked programmes. All of Cool FM shows are locally presented and produced from its Newtownards studios.

Local news bulletins air on the hour between 06:00 and 22:00 every day. On weekdays, there are extended bulletins at 13:00 and 17:00 and headlines on the half hour during breakfast and drivetime.

== Presenters ==
- Paul Kennedy (1995–present)
- Pete Snodden (2000–present)
- DJ Hix (2007–present)
- Stuart Robinson (2010–present)
- Paulo Ross (2014–present)
- John Kearns (1990–1995, 2014-present)
- Owen Beers (2014–present)
- Rebecca McKinney (2015–present)
- Deputy Dave (2015–present)
- Melissa Riddell (2016–present)
- Curtis McCosh (2016–present)
- Katharine Walker (2019–present)
- Evanna Maxted (2021–present)
- Ryan A (2010–2014, 2022-present)
