= Glenconkeyne =

Ancient district in County Londonderry, Northern Ireland

Glenconkeyne (from Irish Gleann Con Cadhain 'valley of Cadhan's hound') is an early-modern Irish district in what is now southern County Londonderry in Northern Ireland. Glenconkeyne formed the western portion of the former barony of Loughinsholin in Mid Ulster, with the ancient districts of Clandonnell, Killetra, and Tomlagh comprising the rest. The area Glenconkeyne covered corresponds to the present-day parishes of Ballynascreen, Desertmartin, and Kilcronaghan.

Glenconkeyne has also been recorded in historical sources as Glankonkein and Glanconkeyne.

== History ==
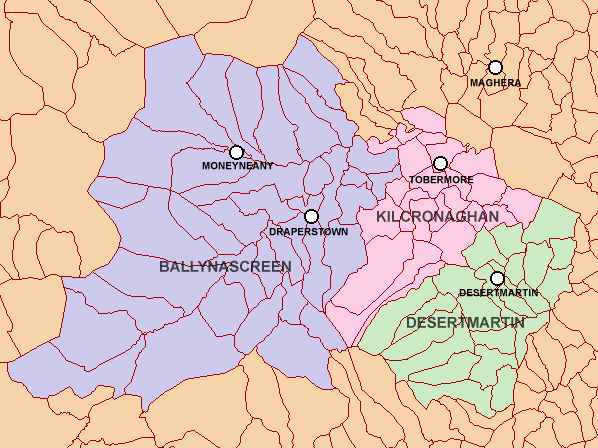
Map of Glenconkeyne depicting its constituent civil parishes of Ballynascreen, Desertmartin, and Kilcronaghan, along with their townlands and settlements.

As a result of the dense forest that used to cover Glenconkeyne and Killetra, both formed the most inaccessible part of the whole of Ulster. The Clandeboye O'Neills are recorded as descending from the thick forests of Glenconkeyne from where they would conquer the shattered remnants of the Earldom of Ulster, becoming the principle Gaelic lords of eastern Ulster, with their territory known in English as Clandeboye.

Local legends allegedly state that Glenconkeyne was a gift of Brian Carrach O'Neill to Cadhan O'Henry for defeating a monstrous hound that was terrorising the region, however the scholar John O'Donovan states that across the country many things appeared to be attributed to an areas last lord, as Brian Carrach O'Neill in this case was. Brian Carrach O'Neill would build a residence near the border of the parishes of Kilcronaghan and Ballynascreen, which became known as Dún Tí Bhriain, preserved as the name of the modern townland of Duntibryan.

In the closing stages of Tyrone's Rebellion, Hugh O'Neill, Earl of Tyrone, and his supporters withdrew into the Glenconkeyne Woods following the Burning of Dungannon. Lord Tyrone was able to successfully evade capture until he made peace with the Crown.

In 1821, John MacCloskey, in his Statistical Reports of Six Derry Parishes, states Tobermore as being the capital settlement of Glenconkeine.

== Proportions and townlands ==
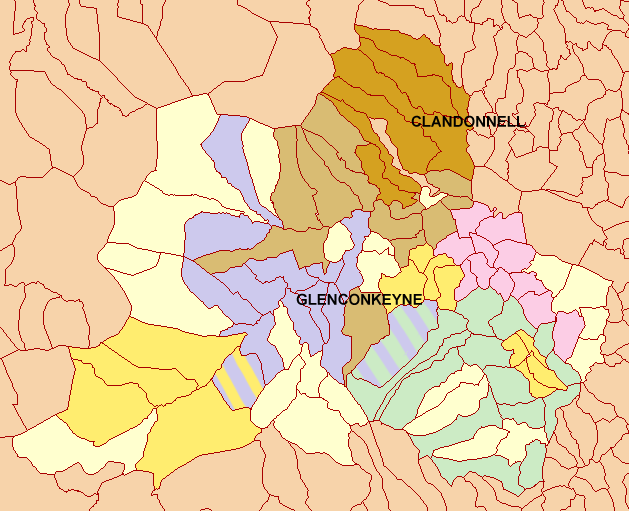
Proportions of Glenconkeyne: * Cohoire (pale purple) * Corramony, Glenconkeyne portion (pale brown) * Corramony, Clandonnell portion (brown) * Cynah (pale green) * Moysaden (pale pink) * Church lands (yellow)

Below is a list of the proportions that Glenconkeyne was divided into as part of the survey of 1609, alongside the townlands which comprised those proportions. These names where recited in the grant of the Charter of Londonderry to The Honourable The Irish Society in 1613. Excluding the church lands, the townlands are thus given in the form provided in the Charter of Londonderry with the modern name if known given afterwards in brackets. Not all townlands recorded survived to the present day. All townlands are of one ballyboe in size unless otherwise stated.

=== Church lands ===
These were originally the termon (or erenagh) lands of the parishes that constitute Glenconkeyne. Under the terms of the Plantation of Ulster, they were retained by the Church of Ireland Bishop of Derry.

- Ballynascreen parish: Cavanreagh; Dunarnon (now part of Owenreagh); Moneyconey; Moyard; Owenreagh; and Tullybrick
- Desertmartin parish: Ballymacpherson; Curr; Knocknagin; and Moydrowne (now called Stranagard)
- Kilcronaghan parish: Granny; Mormeal; Tamnyaskey; and Tullyroan.

=== Cohoire ===
Townlands that still exist:

- Ballmelappagh (Labby, Ballynascreen)
- Ballymebracky, one ballyboe and 1/3 of Lislea (Brackaghlislea, Kilcronaghan)
- Ballinehounreagh (Owenreagh, Ballynascreen)
- Ballymadaulaght (Moydamlaght, Ballynascreen)
- Banchran (Bancran Glebe, Ballynascreen)
- Cohoire (Cahore, Ballynascreen)
- Donagilleduff (Doon, Ballynascreen)
- Dromohderigg (Drumderg, Ballynascreen)
- Dromealegan, one third part of the ballyboe (Straw, Ballynascreen)
- Laghtmesky (Strawmore, Ballynascreen)
- Moychellan (Moyheeland, Ballynascreen)
- Moycherrin, one third part of the ballyboe (Moykeeran, Ballynascreen)
- Tonnagh (Tonaght, Ballynascreen)

Townlands that can't be identified and may no longer exist:

- Ballydomedam
- Ballyroghan, one third part of the ballyboe
- Dromegane
- Monygroyau
- Moylehaghi
- Rahmeigh
- Tristernan, one third part of the ballyboe

=== Corramony ===
This proportion is split between territories of Glenconkeyne and Clandonnell. The following townlands are within Glenconkeyne:

- Balmenoure, one and half ballyboes (Ballynure, Ballynascreen)
- Clony (Cloane, Ballynascreen)
- Corramony (Carnamoney, Ballynascreen)
- Culnesellah (Coolnasillagh, Ballynascreen)
- Derrynard (Derrynoyd, Ballynascreen)
- Domituibrian (Duntibryan, Ballynascreen)
- Dromard, 1/3 of a ballyboe (Drumard, Ballynascreen)
- Dromballyagan (Drumballyhagan and Drumballyhagan Clarke, Kilcronaghan)
- Mollyshanare, two ballyboes (Moneyshanere, Kilcronaghan)
- Monagogy, 1/3 of a ballyboe (possibly Moneyguiggy, Ballynascreen)
- Moybegg (Moybeg Kirley, Kilcronaghan)

The rest of the townlands in this proportion are in Clandonnell:

- Ballyknock-Icleny (Ballyknock, Killelagh)
- Ballmabrcky (Bracaghreilly, Maghera)
- Carely (Kirley, Maghera)
- Falaglona (Fallagloon, Maghera)
- Fillaley, one and a half ballyboes (Fallylea, Killelagh)
- Namroah (Drumconready, Maghera)

=== Cynah ===
Townlands that still exist:

- Ballmegallan (Cullion, Desertmartin)
- Ballyngam (Ballynagown, Desertmartin)
- Ballytannylour (Killyboggin, Desertmartin)
- Consaran (Coolsaragh, Kilcronaghan)
- Crannagh (Cranny, Desertmartin)
- Cynagh (Keenaght, Kilcronaghan)
- Derryneskellan (Durnascallon, Desertmartin)
- Gortihorky (Gortahurk, Kilcronaghan)
- Gortmeren (Gortanewry, Desertmartin)
- Langhell (Longfield, Desertmartin), one balliboe and a half
- Lickmahary (Lecumpher, Desertmartin)
- Lislea (Brackaghlislea, Kilcronaghan), 2/3 of a balliboe
- Lysanny (Annagh, Desertmartin)
- Momisholm (Moneysterlin, Desertmartin)
- Rosiare (Roshure, Desertmartin)
- Torrigan (Tirgan, Desertmartin)
- Vrackah (Brackagh Slieve Gallion, Desertmartin)

Townlands that no longer exist:

- Drombally (Drumbally Hill), 1/2 a balliboe, the other half of which is within the proportion of Moysaden

=== Moysaden ===
Townlands that still exist:

- Ballmeclom (Clooney, Kilcronaghan)
- Cloghom (Cloughfin, Kilcronaghan), one balliboe and a half
- Cowlanamone (Killynumber, Kilcronaghan)
- Culemoire (Calmore, Kilcronaghan)
- Dromaraghy (Drumrainey)
- Dromsanna (Drumsamney, Kilcronaghan)
- Dromore (Dromore, Desertmartin)
- Gortitawry (Gortamney, Kilcronaghan)
- Killitomny (Killytoney, Kilcronaghan)
- Lawny (Luney, Desertmartin)
- Moysaden (Moyesset, Kilcronaghan)
- Tobarmore (Tobermore, Kilcronaghan)

Townlands that can't be identified and may no longer exist:

- Conlaire
- Donnagraven (Grenan, later known as Fortwilliam, now part of Tobermore, Kilcronaghan)
- Drombally (Drumbally Hill), 1/2 a balliboe, the other half of which is in the proportion of Cynah
- Kilnacring
- Tonnaghvore
