= Cloughfin =

- townland

Irish transcription(s)
  - Derivation: Cloch Fhionn
  - Meaning: "White stone"
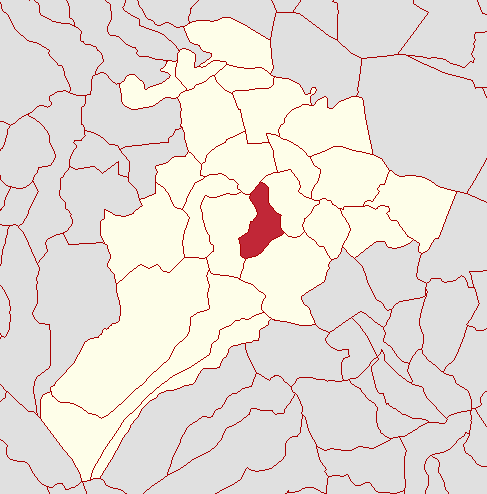

- Cloughfin shown within Northern Ireland Cloughfin (the United Kingdom)
- Coordinates: 54°47′31″N 6°42′25″W
- Sovereign state: United Kingdom
- Country: Northern Ireland
- County: County Londonderry
- Barony: Loughinsholin
- Civil parish: Kilcronaghan
- Plantation grant: Drapers Company and freeholds
- First recorded: 1609

Government
  - Council: Mid Ulster District
  - Ward: Tobermore

Area
  - Total: 177.3 acres (71.77 ha)
- Irish grid ref: H8394

Cloughfin (locally [ˌklɔxˈfïn], from Irish Cloch Fhionn, meaning 'white stone') is a townland lying within the civil parish of Kilcronaghan, County Londonderry, Northern Ireland. It lies in the center of the parish, and is bounded by the following townlands: Calmore, Coolsaragh, Killytoney, and Tullyroan. It was apportioned to the Drapers company and freeholds.

The townland was part of Tobermore electoral ward of the former Magherafelt District Council, however in 1901 and 1926 it was part of Iniscarn district electoral division as part of the Draperstown dispensary (registrar's) district of Magherafelt Rural District. It was also part of the historic barony of Loughinsholin.

== History ==
Whilst Cloughfin is cited as meaning "white stone", it can not be ruled out that it may have a connection to the legendary figure, Finn McCool. There appears to be no trace left of the rock, which the townland is named after.

Population
Year	Pop.
1841	99
1851	72
1861	74
1871	64
1881	50
1891	44
1901	39
1911	29
1926	12

Size (acres, roods, poles)
Year	a, r, p
1851	178, 1, 7
1881	178, 1, 7
1901	178, 1, 7
1926	178, 2, 2

Earlier recorded forms
Year	Form
1609	Cloghom (E.C.)
1613	Cloghfine
1613	Cloghom (Charter)
1622	Cloughtym
1654	Cloughfin
1654	Clowghfin
1657	Cloghony
1663	Clohtine
1767	Cloughfin
_{(E.C.) - Echeated Counties Map 1609 (Charter) - Charter of Londonderry 1613}

== See also ==
- Kilcronaghan
- List of townlands in Tobermore
- Tobermore
