= Desertmartin =

Village in County Londonderry, Northern Ireland

Coordinates: 54°46′N 6°41′W

Desertmartin: Irish: Díseart Mhártain
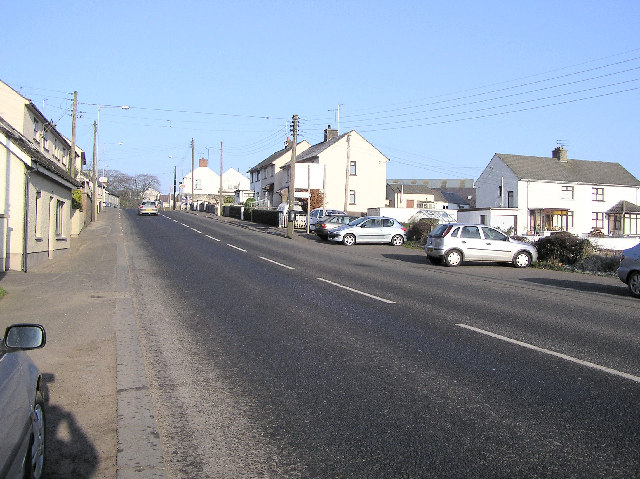

- Location within Northern Ireland
- Population: (2011 Census)
- District: Mid Ulster
- County: County Londonderry
- Country: Northern Ireland
- Sovereign state: United Kingdom

Desertmartin (/ˌdɛzərtˈmɑːrtɪn/; from Irish Díseart Mhártain, meaning 'Saint Martin's hermitage') is a small village in County Londonderry, Northern Ireland. It is four miles from Magherafelt, at the foot of Slieve Gallion. In the 2001 Census the greater Desertmartin area had a population of 1,276. It lies within Desertmartin parish, Mid-Ulster District, and the historic barony of Loughinsholin. Neighbouring settlements include Draperstown, Magherafelt, Moneymore, and Tobermore.

== History ==
The monastic hermitage of Desertmartin was originally dedicated to Saint Martin of Tours. The remains of the ancient parish church are in the townland of Knocknagin at the east side of the village.

When County Coleraine was created in 1585, its administration was meant to be carried out in the town of Coleraine. However, the jail and courthouse were built in Desertmartin.

On 19 May 1922, during the Irish War of Independence, a mob of unionists and Ulster Special Constables attacked and burned many Catholic homes and businesses in Desertmartin, in revenge for the burning of a unionist-owned mill. Special Constables took four Catholic men from their homes outside the village and summarily executed them by the roadside.

== Religious buildings ==
- St Patrick's, townland of Keenaght (Roman Catholic) (Old Chapel).
- St Patrick's, townland of Keenaght (Roman Catholic) (New Chapel).
- St. Mary's, townland of Annagh and Moneysterlin (Roman Catholic) Church and adjacent Parochial House are landmark buildings. It is commonly referred to as Coolcalm after the former townland of same name, which is now part of Annagh and Moneysterlin.
- Church of the Nazarene (a branch of the denomination of the same name based on Wesleyan tradition).
- St Comgall’s Church of Ireland (Desertmartin Parish) is a visually and historically significant building and a local landmark. The church was built in 1821 and is a listed building. St Comgall’s Church is located on the Dromore Road in the village and looks out over the scenic Slieve Gallion mountain.

== Schools ==
- St. Columb's Primary School (Roman Catholic)
- Desertmartin Primary School
- Knocknagin Primary School (Roman Catholic)

== Transport ==
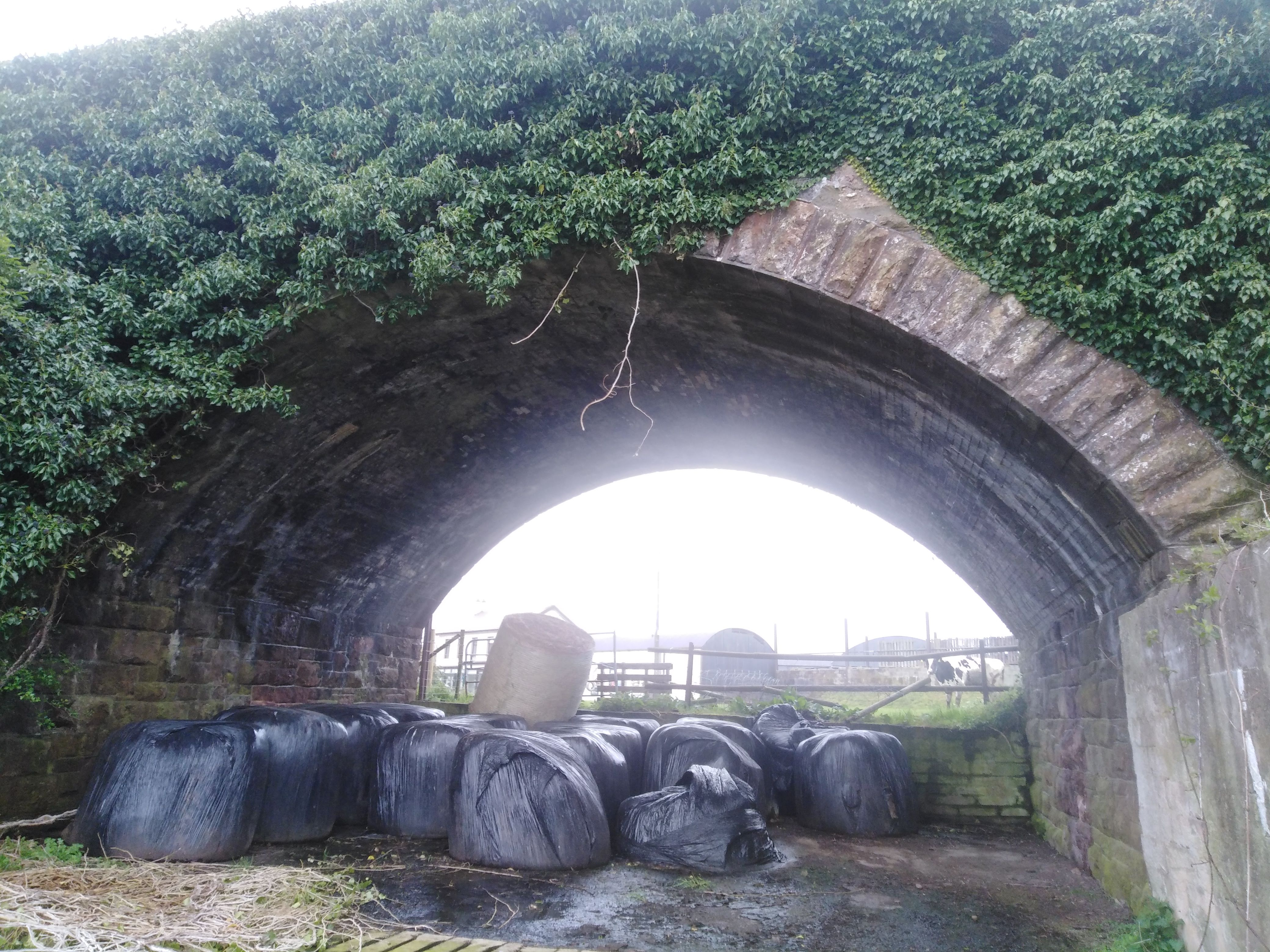
The old railway bridge that once spanned the railway near Desertmartin

Desertmartin railway station between Magherafelt and Draperstown opened on 20 July 1883, shut for passengers on 1 October 1930, and shut altogether on 3 July 1950.

== People ==
Tom Paulin (b. 1949) is a major Northern Irish poet, essayist, editor and lecturer, who has written a poem entitled Desertmartin.

== Sport ==
- St. Martin's Desertmartin Gaelic Athletic Association St Martin's GAA Club
- Desertmartin Football Club
