= Coolsaragh =

Townland in County Londonderry, Northern Ireland

- townland

Irish transcription(s)
  - Derivation: Cúil Sáráin
  - Meaning: "Sárán's recess"
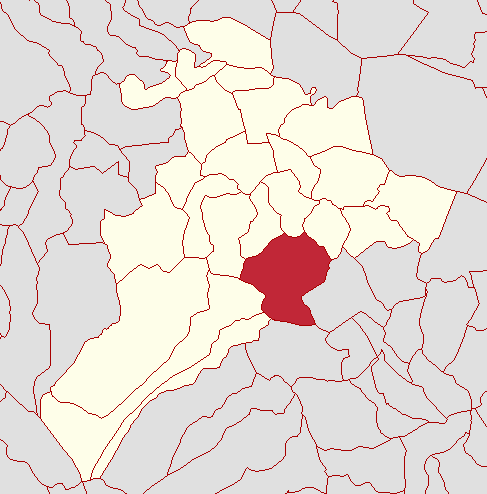

- Coolsaragh shown within Northern Ireland Coolsaragh (the United Kingdom)
- Coordinates: 54°46′59″N 6°41′56″W
- Sovereign state: United Kingdom
- Country: Northern Ireland
- County: County Londonderry
- Barony: Loughinsholin
- Civil parish: Kilcronaghan
- Plantation grant: Drapers Company
- First recorded: 1609

Government
  - Council: Mid Ulster District
  - Ward: Tobermore

Area
  - Total: 535.9 acres (216.87 ha)
- Irish grid ref: H838936

Coolsaragh (/ˌkuːlˈsɑːrə/, from Irish Cúil Sáráin, meaning 'Sárán's recess') is a townland lying within the civil parish of Kilcronaghan, County Londonderry, Northern Ireland. It lies in the south of the parish on the boundary with the civil parish of Desertmartin, and it is bounded by the townlands of: Annagh & Moneysterlinn, Cloughfin, Gortahurk, Keenaght, Killynumber, Killytoney, Longfield, and Tullyroan. It was apportioned to the Drapers company.

The townland was part of the Tobermore electoral ward of the former Magherafelt District Council, however in 1901 and 1926 it was part of Iniscarn district electoral division as part of the Draperstown dispensary (registrar's) district of Magherafelt Rural District. It was also part of the historic barony of Loughinsholin.

== Etymology ==
Coolsaragh, despite the various different spellings, many of which contain erroneous letters, such as h for r and f for s, appears to derive from something like Culsaran or Coolsaran. The loss of the n at the end of the word, whilst not common in Irish placenames, has occasionally occurred elsewhere.

The "saran" could possibly be derived from the Irish word során, which means "wireworm", a kind of insect that is a considerable pest for farmers, eating the roots of tuberous plants. This would give the derivation of Cúil Során, meaning "recess of the wireworms". This however is unlikely to be the origin of Coolsaragh as it doesn't contain an article meaning "of the". The lack of this article suggests either a personal name or a now obsolete noun. The personal name Sárán is used in the townlands of Kilsaran and Tisaran, and was the name of several saints and an early king of Ulster, and is quite possibly the meaning of "saran" in Culsaran or Coolsaran.

== History ==
Population
Year	Pop.
1841	192
1851	186
1861	171
1871	165
1881	167
1891	143
1901	128
1911	114
1926	107

Size (acres, roods, poles)
Year	a, r, p
1851	526, 0, 16
1881	526, 0, 16
1901	526, 0, 16
1926	526, 2, 27

Earlier recorded forms
Year	Form
1609	Cowsaran (E.C.)
1613	Colsanan
1613	Consaran
1613	Coullaire (Charter)
1622	Coolsaram
1654	Cullsarran
1657	Consaren
1659c	Coolesahan
1663	Culfanum
1767	Culsaragh
1813	Coolsarah
1834c	Cool-sarragh
_{(E.C.) - Escheated Counties Map 1609 (Charter) - Charter of Londonderry 1613}

== See also ==
- Kilcronaghan
- List of townlands in Tobermore
- Tobermore
