= Tamnyaskey =

Townland (administrative area) in Northern Ireland

- townland

Irish transcription(s)
  - Derivation: Tamhnaigh Oscair
  - Meaning: "Oscar's field (?)"
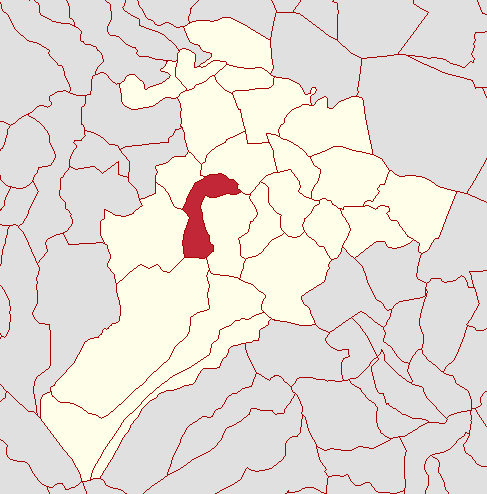

- Tamnyaskey shown within Northern Ireland Tamnyaskey (the United Kingdom)
- Coordinates: 54°47′42″N 6°43′41″W
- Sovereign state: United Kingdom
- Country: Northern Ireland
- County: County Londonderry
- Barony: Loughinsholin
- Civil parish: Kilcronaghan
- Plantation grant: Church lands
- First recorded: 1654

Government
  - Council: Mid Ulster District
  - Ward: Tobermore

Area
  - Total: 219.8 acres (88.93 ha)
- Irish grid ref: H8195

Tamnyaskey (locally [ˌtamniˈaːski], from Irish Tamhnaigh Oscair 'Oscar's field (?)') is a townland lying within the civil parish of Kilcronaghan, County Londonderry, Northern Ireland. It lies in the west of the parish, and is bounded by the townlands of Brackaghlislea, Calmore, Granny, Mormeal, and Tullyroan. It wasn't apportioned to any of the London livery companies, being kept as church lands.

The townland was part of the Tobermore electoral ward of the former Magherafelt District Council, however in 1926 it was part of Tobermore district electoral division as part of the Maghera division of Magherafelt Rural District. It was also part of the historic barony of Loughinsholin.

== History ==
Along with the townlands of Granny, Mormeal, and Tullyroan, Tamneyaskey comprises the four townlands that make up the Bishop of Derrys lands in the parish. Prior to the Plantation of Ulster, these four townlands constituted the termon (or erenagh) land of the parish, and were known as "Ballintrolla, Derreskerdan, Dirrygrinagh et Kellynahawla". Despite these townlands being in the same location as the later townlands, it is now impossible to match their names accurately.

=== Statistics ===
Population
Year	Pop.
1841	98
1851	75
1861	97
1871	67
1881	83
1891	65
1901	43 ^{[a]}
1911	41
1926	45
^[a] - decrease is attributed to emigration and removals

Size (acres, roods, poles)
Year	a, r, p
1851	239, 1, 14
1881	237, 2, 25
1901	237, 2, 25
1926	228, 0, 5

Earlier recorded forms
Year	Form
1654	Tamneosker
1657c	Tawneosker
1659c	Tauniagher
1661	Tawneosker
1661c	Tamlaghoskutt
1663	Tawnaosker
1672c	Tomnasker
1672c	Townasker
1680	Tateneosker
1767	Tammaskey
1813	Tamneyaskey (S.M.)
_{(S.M.) - Sampson's Map}

== See also ==
- Kilcronaghan
- List of townlands in Tobermore
- Tobermore
