= Mormeal =

- townland

Irish transcription(s)
  - Derivation: Mír Mhíchíl
  - Meaning: "Michael's portion"
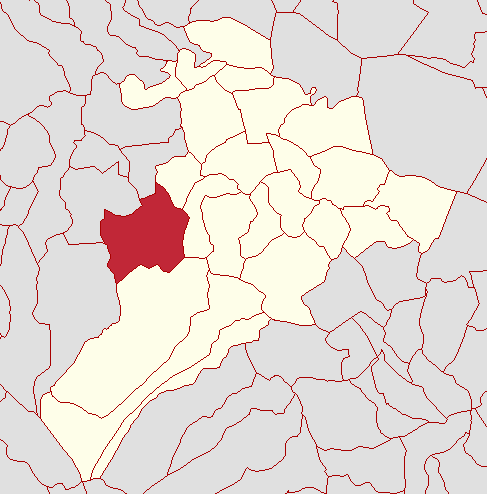

- Mormeal shown within Northern Ireland Mormeal (the United Kingdom)
- Coordinates: 54°47′28″N 6°44′38″W
- Sovereign state: United Kingdom
- Country: Northern Ireland
- County: County Londonderry
- Barony: Loughinsholin
- Civil parish: Kilcronaghan
- Plantation grant: Church lands
- First recorded: 1654

Government
  - Council: Mid Ulster District
  - Ward: Tobermore

Area
  - Total: 537.8 acres (217.65 ha)
- Irish grid ref: H8094

Mormeal (locally [ˌmɔrˈmeːl] and [ˌmɔrˈmiːl], from Irish Mír Mhíchíl 'Michael's portion') is a townland lying within the civil parish of Kilcronaghan, County Londonderry, Northern Ireland. It lies in the west of the parish with the Altagoan river to its west forming the parish boundary with Ballynascreen. It is bounded by the townlands of: Brackaghlislea, Drumard, Duntibryan, Gortnaskey, Granny, Tamnyaskey. It wasn't apportioned to any of the London livery companies, being kept as church lands.

The townland was part of Tobermore electoral ward of the former Magherafelt District Council, however in 1926 it was part of Tobermore district electoral division as part of the Maghera division of Magherafelt Rural District. It was also part of the historic barony of Loughinsholin.

== Etymology ==
The actual Irish origin of Mormeal is unknown with several different variants provided, most notably by Alfred Munn Moore. The most recent translation as of 2002 states its origin as being; Mír Mhíchíl, meaning Michael's portion. Older origins include:

- Mor-meall meaning "great hillock". Mór Mael(án) in modern Irish.
- Baile mor miol meaning "town of the monsters".
- Magh-adhair m-bheal (pronounced "mawr-meal") meaning "plain of the fire, or adoration, of the god Belus (the sun)".

== History ==
Along with the townlands of Granny, Tamnyaskey, and Tullyroan, Mormeal comprises the four townlands that make up the Bishop of Derrys lands in the parish. Prior to the Plantation of Ulster, these four townlands constituted the termon (or erenagh) land of the parish, and were known as "Ballintrolla, Derreskerdan, Dirrygrinagh et Kellynahawla". Despite these townlands being in the same location as the later townlands, it is now impossible to match their names accurately.

The ruins of the ancient parish church of Kilcronaghan lie within the townland of Mormeal. In the east of the townland on a hill (438 ft.) lies an ancient ráth, and one on another hill (450 ft.) to the south.

=== Statistics ===
Population
Year	Pop.
1841	330
1851	254
1861	244
1871	220
1881	209
1891	162
1901	142
1911	150
1926	127

Size (acres, roods, poles)
Year	a, r, p
1851	515, 1, 3
1881	515, 1, 3
1901	515, 1, 3
1926	527, 1, 31

Earlier recorded forms
Year	Form
1654	Mirrimeith
1657c	Merinnch (D.S.)
1659c	Mirmihellgrany (joined with Granny)
1661	Merrinnieth
1661c	Mirmichell
1672c	Mermeth
1680	Mermeale
1686	Meremeala
1767	Mermeal
1813	Mormeal (S.M.)
_{(D.S.) - Down Survey Map (S.M.) - Sampson's Map}

== See also ==
- Kilcronaghan
- List of townlands in Tobermore
- Tobermore
