= Keenaght (townland) =

- townland

Irish transcription(s)
  - Derivation: Caonach
  - Meaning: "Mossy place"
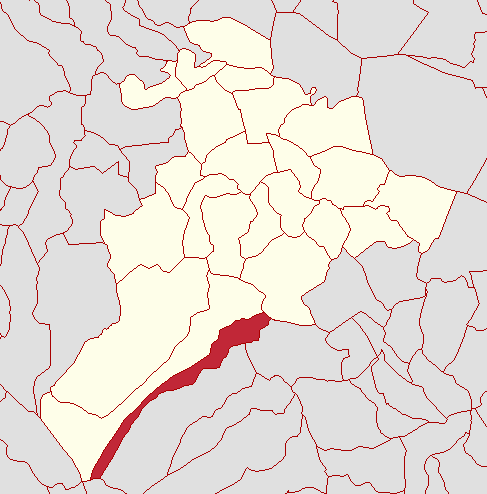

- Keenaght shown within Northern Ireland Keenaght (the United Kingdom)
- Coordinates: 54°45′54″N 6°44′06″W
- Sovereign state: United Kingdom
- Country: Northern Ireland
- County: County Londonderry
- Barony: Loughinsholin
- Civil parish: Kilcronaghan
- Plantation grant: Drapers Company
- First recorded: 1609

Government
  - Council: Mid Ulster District
  - Ward: Tobermore

Area
  - Total: 308.6 acres (124.87 ha)
- Irish grid ref: H8191

Keenaght (locally [ˌkʲiːnəx], from Irish Caonach 'mossy place') is a townland lying within the civil parish of Kilcronaghan, County Londonderry, Northern Ireland. It lies in the south of the parish on the boundary with the civil parish of Desertmartin, and it is bounded by the townlands of: Coolsaragh, Cullion, Gortahurk, Longfield, and Tintagh. It was apportioned to the Drapers company.

The townland was part of Tobermore electoral ward of the former Magherafelt District Council, however in 1901 and 1926 it was part of Iniscarn district electoral division as part of the Draperstown dispensary (registrar's) district of Magherafelt Rural District. As part of Kilcronaghan civil parish, Keenaght also lies in the historic barony of Loughinsholin.

== Etymology ==
The present name of this townland, Keenaght, is very likely a reformed analogy of the neighbouring barony of Keenaght, with scribal errors adding a t to the end of anglicisations of its name such as with Tonaght in the neighbouring parish of Ballynascreen, which actually derives from Tonach. It is more reasonably suggested that Keenaght derives from the synonym Coanna with the adjectival suffix -ach added to it. This derivation is supported by the majority of earlier recorded forms.

== History ==
Population
Year	Pop.
1841	122
1851	77
1861	82
1871	83
1881	79
1891	73
1901	65
1911	61
1926	45

Size (acres, roods, poles)
Year	a, r, p
1851	311, 0, 10
1881	310, 2, 18
1901	310, 2, 18
1926	310, 3, 2

Earlier recorded forms
Year	Form
1609 + 1613	Cynagh (E.C.) (Charter)
1613	Keenah
1622	Keenat
1654	Keanaught foord
1654	Keanaugh
1657	Cyneigh, the small proportion of
1661	Keanagh
1767	Keenaght
1813	Keenagh (S.M.)
_{(E.C.) - Escheated Counties Map 1609 (Charter) - Charter of Londonderry 1613 (S.M.) - Sampson's Map}

== See also ==
- Kilcronaghan
- List of townlands in Tobermore
- Tobermore
