= Granny (townland) =

- townland

Irish transcription(s)
  - Derivation: Greanaigh
  - Meaning: "Gravelly place"
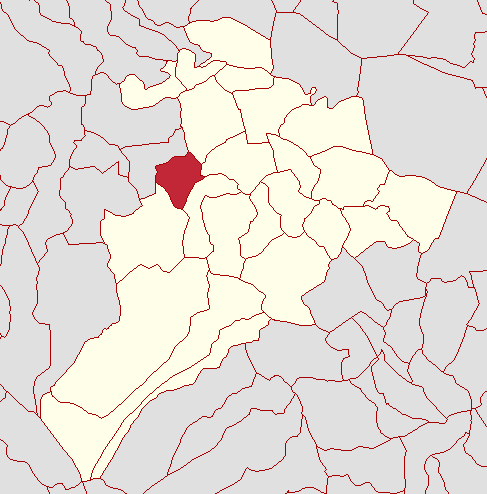

- Granny shown within Northern Ireland Granny (the United Kingdom)
- Coordinates: 54°48′04″N 6°44′02″W
- Sovereign state: United Kingdom
- Country: Northern Ireland
- County: County Londonderry
- Barony: Loughinsholin
- Civil parish: Kilcronaghan
- Plantation grant: Church lands
- First recorded: 1609
- Settlements: Kilross

Government
  - Council: Mid Ulster District
  - Ward: Tobermore

Area
  - Total: 162.8 acres (65.88 ha)
- Irish grid ref: H8195

Granny (from Irish Greanaigh 'gravelly place') is a townland lying within the civil parish of Kilcronaghan, County Londonderry, Northern Ireland. It lies in the west of the parish on the boundary of the civil parish of Ballynascreen, and is bounded by the townlands of; Calmore, Duntribryan, Moneyshanere, Mormeal, and Tamnyaskey. It wasn't apportioned to any of the London livery companies, being kept as church lands.

The townland was part of Tobermore electoral ward of the former Magherafelt District Council, however in 1926 it was part of Tobermore district electoral division as part of the Maghera division of Magherafelt Rural District. It was also part of the historic barony of Loughinsholin.

The hamlet of Kilross Villas and Kilross Primary School both lie within this townland along the Duntibryan road.

== History ==
Along with the townlands of Mormeal, Tamnyaskey, and Tullyroan, Granny comprises the four townlands that make up the Bishop of Derrys lands in the parish. Prior to the Plantation of Ulster, these four townlands constituted the termon (or erenagh) land of the parish, and were known as "Ballintrolla, Derreskerdan, Dirrygrinagh et Kellynahawla". Despite these townlands being in the same location as the later townlands, it is now impossible to match their names accurately.

=== Statistics ===
Population
Year	Pop.
1841	100
1851	88
1861	78
1871	77
1881	57
1891	58
1901	52
1911	37
1926	36

Size (acres, roods, poles)
Year	a, r, p
1851	158, 0, 34
1881	158, 0, 34
1901	158, 0, 34
1926	158, 3, 32

Earlier recorded forms
Year	Form
1609	Durngrunagh
1654	Cranne
1654	Granny
1657c	Cranny
1659c	Mirmihellgrany (joined with Mormeal)
1661c	Grenaghan
1663	Crinney
1672c	Ganny
1813	Granny (S.M.)
_{(S.M.) - Sampson's Map}

== See also ==
- Kilcronaghan
- List of townlands in Tobermore
- Tobermore
