= Killytoney =

- townland

Irish transcription(s)
  - Derivation: Coill an Tonnaigh
  - Meaning: "Wood of the stockade"
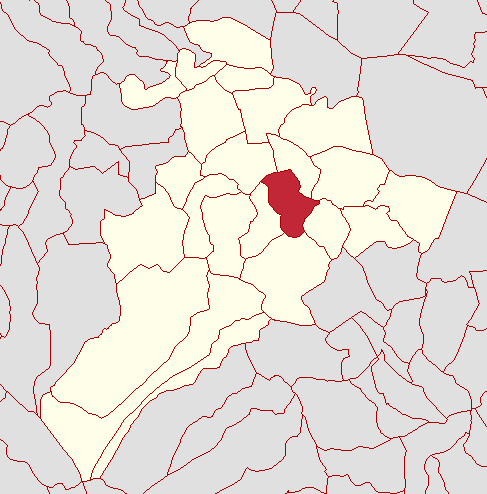

- Killytoney shown within Northern Ireland Killytoney (the United Kingdom)
- Coordinates: 54°47′46″N 6°41′53″W
- Sovereign state: United Kingdom
- Country: Northern Ireland
- County: County Londonderry
- Barony: Loughinsholin
- Civil parish: Kilcronaghan
- Plantation grant: Drapers Company
- First recorded: 1609

Government
  - Council: Mid Ulster District
  - Ward: Tobermore

Area
  - Total: 208.6 acres (84.42 ha)
- Irish grid ref: H8395

Killytoney (locally [ˌkʲïləˈtӧni], from Irish Coill an Tonnaigh, meaning 'wood of the stockade') is a townland lying within the civil parish of Kilcronaghan, County Londonderry, Northern Ireland. It lies in the center of the parish, and is bounded by the townlands of Calmore, Cloughfin, Coolsaragh, Gortamney, Killynumber, and Moyesset. It was apportioned to the Drapers company.

The townland was part of Tobermore electoral ward of the former Magherafelt District Council, however in 1901 and 1926 it was part of Iniscarn district electoral division as part of the Draperstown dispensary (registrar's) district of Magherafelt Rural District. It was also part of the historic barony of Loughinsholin.

== Etymology ==
The first element of the name Killytoney can be either from the Irish words coill (wood) or cill (church), which are indistinguishable in anglicistions due to their pronunciation. Despite this all previous authorities including Irish language scholar John O'Donovan support the derivation from coill. O'Donovan also postulated that the second element is derived from "Tonnaig" (sic), meaning "mound" or "rampart". The Place-Names of Northern Ireland project agrees with this derivation citing that a rath formerly lay within this townland, and that a stockade may have been part of this structure or near it.

== History ==
Population
Year	Pop.
1841	61
1851	67
1861	75
1871	68
1881	56
1891	47
1901	38
1911	40
1926	28

Size (acres, roods, poles)
Year	a, r, p
1851	207, 2, 29
1881	206, 1, 31
1901	206, 1, 31
1926	207, 2, 15

Earlier recorded forms
Year	Form
1609	Kilitvnny (E.C.)
1613	Killitomny (Charter)
1613	Kilteny
1654	Killtony
1657	Killytony
1661	Killtonney
1663	Kilty-Sonthe, Quarter of
1767	Killytoney
1813	Killtinny (S.M.)
_{(E.C.) - Escheated Counties Map 1609 (Charter) - Charter of Londonderry 1613 (S.M.) - Sampson's Map}

== See also ==
- Kilcronaghan
- List of townlands in Tobermore
- Tobermore
