= Brackaghlislea =

- townland

Irish transcription(s)
  - Derivation: An Bhreacach
  - Meaning: "The speckled place"

Irish transcription(s)
  - Derivation: Lios Liath
  - Meaning: "Grey fort"
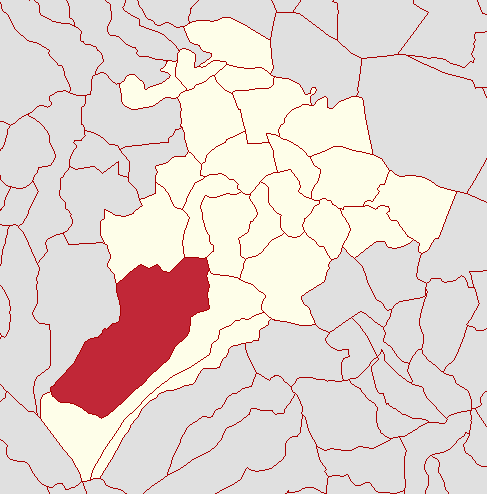

- Brackaghlislea shown within Northern Ireland Brackaghlislea (the United Kingdom)
- Coordinates: 54°46′22″N 6°45′02″W
- Sovereign state: United Kingdom
- Country: Northern Ireland
- County: County Londonderry
- Barony: Loughinsholin
- Civil parish: Kilcronaghan
- Plantation grant: Drapers Company and freeholds
- First recorded: 1609

Government
  - Council: Mid Ulster District
  - Ward: Tobermore

Area
  - Total: 1,258.0 acres (509.09 ha)
- Irish grid ref: H805924

Brackaghlislea (locally [ˌbraklïsˈleː], [ˌbrakrïsˈleː], and [ˌbrakïsˈleː]; from Irish An Bhreacach, meaning 'the speckled place', and Lios Liath, meaning "grey fort") is a townland lying within the civil parish of Kilcronaghan, County Londonderry, Northern Ireland. It lies to the south-west of the parish and is bounded to the south and west by the civil parish of Ballinascreen. It is bounded by the following townlands: Drumard, Gortahurk, Mormeal, Tamnyaskey and Tullyroan. It was apportioned to the Drapers company and freeholds.

The townland was part of Tobermore electoral ward of the former Magherafelt District Council, however in 1901 and 1926 it was part of Iniscarn district electoral division as part of the Draperstown dispensary (registrar's) district of Magherafelt Rural District. It was also part of the historic barony of Loughinsholin.

== History ==
The modern townland of Brackaghlislea appears to be the amalgamation of two 17th-century townlands: Ballynebracky (from Irish Baile na Breacai, meaning 'townland of the speckled place'); and Lislea (from Irish Lios Liath, meaning 'grey fort'). They are listed separately in several early sources and appear side by side in a map of the Escheated Counties from 1609.

Population
Year	Pop.
1841	710
1851	480
1861	487
1871	423
1881	386
1891	233 ^{a}
1901	236
1911	250
1926	65
_{a - the sharp decrease is attributed to emigration}

Size (acres, roods, poles)
Year	a, r, p
1851	1247, 3, 18
1881	1248, 3, 6
1901	1248, 3, 6
1926	1251, 0, 3

Earlier recorded forms
Year	Form
1609	B-nebracky (E.C.)
1609	Lislea
1613	Ballymebracky (Charter)
1613	Lislea, ^{1}/_{3} part of the balliboe of (Charter)
1613	Lislea, ^{2}/_{3} part of the balliboe of
1654	Breakagh-Lisslea
1657	Ballynebracky
1659c	Brackagh Listea
1663	Brucklagh
1813	Brackaghlislea
_{(E.C.) - Escheated Counties Map 1609 (Charter) - Charter of Londonderry 1613}

== See also ==
- Kilcronaghan
- List of townlands in Tobermore
- Tobermore
