= Moneyshanere =

Townland (administrative division) in Northern Ireland

- townland
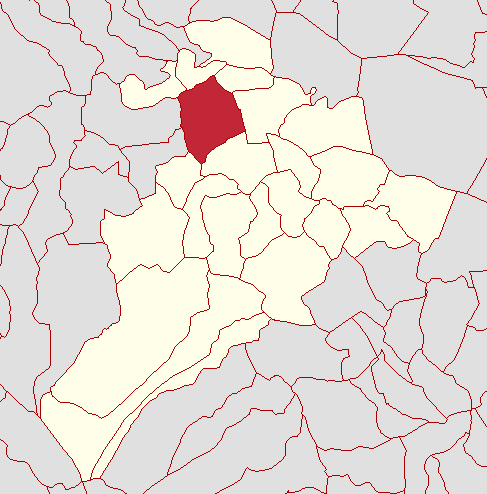

- Moneyshanere shown within Northern Ireland Moneyshanere (the United Kingdom)
- Coordinates: 54°48′43″N 6°43′23″W
- Sovereign state: United Kingdom
- Country: Northern Ireland
- County: County Londonderry
- Barony: Loughinsholin
- Civil parish: Kilcronaghan
- Plantation grant: Drapers Company and Crown freeholds
- First recorded: 1609
- Settlements: Tobermore

Government
  - Council: Magherafelt District Council
  - Ward: Tobermore

Area
  - Total: 368.3 acres (149.03 ha)
- Irish grid ref: H8196

Moneyshanere (locally [ˌmӧniʃïnˈair]) is a townland lying within the civil parish of Kilcronaghan, County Londonderry, Northern Ireland. It lies in the north-west of the parish on the boundary with the civil parish of Ballynascreen, and it is bounded by the townlands of: Calmore, Drumcrow, Drumballyhagan Clark, Duntibryan, Granny, Moneyguiggy, Moybeg Kirley, and Tobermore. It was apportioned to the Drapers company and Crown freeholds.

The townland was part of Tobermore electoral ward of the former Magherafelt District Council, however in 1926, it was part of Tobermore district electoral division as part of the Maghera division of Magherafelt Rural District. It was also part of the historic barony of Loughinsholin.

The town of Tobermore lies partially in this townland, and those of Calmore, Moyesset, and Tobermore. The local parish church of Kilcronaghan also lies within Moneyshanere.

== Etymology ==
The Irish origin the name Moneyshanere derives from is unknown. Several possible origins have however been given over the years:

- Moín na Seánoir (bog of the old man/bard/druid)
- Muine Sean Iúir (thicket of old yews)
- Muine Sean Oir (thicket of old spindle trees)
- Muine Sean Fhéir (brake of the old coarse grass)
- Mona Sean Saighir (crest/ridge of the ancient priest)

Alfred Munn Moore in his Notes on the Place Names of the Parishes and Townlands of the County of Londonderry, makes note that St. Ciaran was known as the "ancient priest" or "Sean Saighir", possibly referring to St. Ciarán of Saigir.

== History ==
Population
Year	Pop.
1841	137
1851	115
1861	105
1871	99
1881	109
1891	59
1901	76
1911	342 ^{[a]}
1926	99
^[a] along with townlands of Calmore and Moneyshanere, population counted as part of total for Tobermore town

Size (acres, roods, poles)
Year	a, r, p
1851	369, 0, 27
1881	369, 0, 27
1901	369, 0, 27
1926	368, 3, 16

Earlier recorded forms
Year	Form
1609	Mollishanare (O.S.)
1613	Mollyshanare (Charter)
1613	Montshenar
1622	Moneshanar
1654	Manishinor
1657	Molyshanare
1659c	Monishnare
1661	Mannishinore
1663	Morishnose
1767	Monishanere
1813	Monishanere (S.M.)
_{(O.S.) - Ordnance Survey map 1609 (Charter) - Charter of Londonderry 1613 (S.M.) Sampson's Map}

== See also ==
- Kilcronaghan
- List of townlands in Tobermore
- Tobermore

== In literature ==
Moneyshanere is remembered in F. L. Lucas's poem 'Her answer, in after years' (1935), recalling a visit to County Londonderry and expressing a craving

For the twilit air by Moneyshanere

That the peat-smoke scents afar,

For the stream that croons her lonely tunes

By the road from Magherá.
