= Moyesset =

- townland

Irish transcription(s)
  - Derivation: Uncertain
  - Meaning: "Plain of weasels"
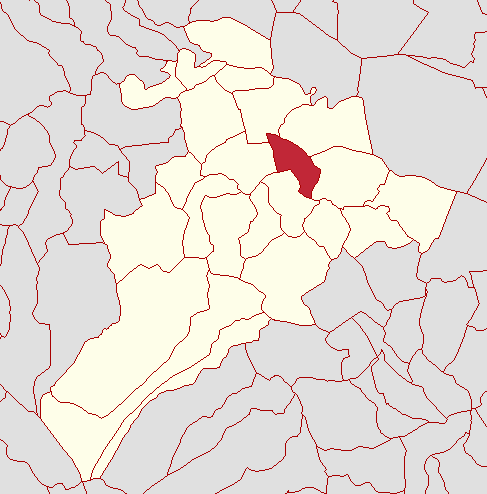

- Moyesset shown within Northern Ireland Moyesset (the United Kingdom)
- Coordinates: 54°48′14″N 6°41′46″W
- Sovereign state: United Kingdom
- Country: Northern Ireland
- County: County Londonderry
- Barony: Loughinsholin
- Civil parish: Kilcronaghan
- Plantation grant: Drapers Company and Crown freeholds
- First recorded: 1609
- Settlements: Tobermore

Government
  - Council: Mid Ulster District
  - Ward: Tobermore

Area
  - Total: 159.3 acres (64.45 ha)
- Irish grid ref: H8395

Moyesset (locally [ˌmɔiˈɛsït]) is a townland lying within the civil parish of Kilcronaghan, County Londonderry, Northern Ireland. It lies in the centre of the parish, and is bounded by the townlands of; Calmore, Clooney, Gortamney, Killytoney, and Tobermore. It was apportioned to the Drapers company and Crown freeholds.

The townland was part of Tobermore electoral ward of the former Magherafelt District Council, however in 1926 it was part of Tobermore district electoral division as part of the Maghera division of Magherafelt Rural District. It was also part of the historic barony of Loughinsholin.

== History ==
Population
| Year | Pop. |
|---|---|
| 1841 | 87 |
| 1851 | 86 |
| 1861 | 91 |
| 1871 | 74 |
| 1881 | 68 |
| 1891 | 58 |
| 1901 | 55 |
| 1911 | 43 |
| 1926 | 45 |

Size (acres, roods, poles)
| Year | a, r, p |
|---|---|
| 1851 | 159, 3, 29 |
| 1881 | 160, 1, 10 |
| 1901 | 160, 1, 10 |
| 1926 | 160, 1, 39 |

Earlier recorded forms
| Year | Form |
|---|---|
| 1609 | Moyasaden (O.S.) |
| 1613 | Moyaserdan (Charter) |
| 1613 | Moyesset |
| 1613 | Moysaden |
| 1622 | Moyessett |
| 1654 | Moysett |
| 1657 | Moyasaden, the small proportion of |
| 1657 | Moyasserden |
| 1767 | Mayesset |
| 1813 | Moyasset (S.M.) |
_{(O.S.) - Ordnance Survey map (1609) (Charter) - Charter of Londonderry (1613) (S.M.) - Sampson's Map}

== See also ==
- Kilcronaghan
- List of townlands in Tobermore
- Tobermore
