= Gortahurk, Kilcronaghan civil parish =

Gortahurk
- townland

Irish transcription(s)
  - Derivation: Gort an Choirce
  - Meaning: "Field of the oats"
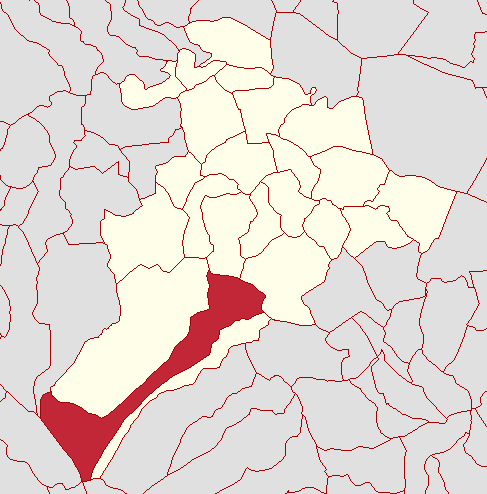

- Gortahurk shown within Northern Ireland Gortahurk (the United Kingdom)
- Coordinates: 54°45′54″N 6°44′28″W
- Sovereign state: United Kingdom
- Country: Northern Ireland
- County: County Londonderry
- Barony: Loughinsholin
- Civil parish: Kilcronaghan
- Plantation grant: Drapers Company
- First recorded: 1609

Government
  - Council: Mid Ulster District
  - Ward: Tobermore

Area
  - Total: 869.6 acres (351.93 ha)
- Irish grid ref: H811915

Gortahurk (locally [ˌɡɔrtəˈhɔrk] and [ˌɡɔrtneˈhərk], from Irish Gort an Choirce 'field of the oats') is a townland lying within the civil parish of Kilcronaghan, County Londonderry, Northern Ireland. It lies on the extreme south-west of the parish on the boundary with the parish of Ballynascreen. It is bounded by the townlands of Brackaghlislea, Coolsaragh, Drumard, Keenaght, Letteran, Straw Mountain, Tintagh, and Tullyroan. It was apportioned to the Drapers company.

The townland was part of Tobermore electoral ward of the former Magherafelt District Council, however in 1901 and 1926 it was part of Iniscarn district electoral division as part of the Draperstown dispensary (registrar's) district of Magherafelt Rural District. It was also part of the historic barony of Loughinsholin.

== Etymology ==
Gortahurk derives its name from the Irish Gort an Choirce meaning "field of the oats". Two of the earliest recordings of this townland however—GortyIchorchy (1609) and Gort Okorte (1613)—suggest that the scribe felt that the final element of the name Gortahurk was a surname. This is testified by the use of the capital I in GortyIchorchy and the capital O in Okorte, both of which represent the Irish surname prefix Ui. Despite this no suitable surname is attested to in any of the major works on Irish surnames.

== History ==
Population
Year	Pop.
1841	186
1851	129
1861	98
1871	95
1881	99
1891	69
1901	66
1911	79
1926	62

Size (acres, roods, poles)
Year	a, r, p
1851	878, 2, 22
1881	878, 2, 22
1901	878, 2, 22
1926	873, 0, 29

Earlier recorded forms
Year	Form
1609	GortyIchorchy (E.C.)
1613	Gort Okorte
1613	Gortiharky (Charter)
1622	Gortocork
1654	Gorkcorke
1657	Gortihorky
1659c	Gortikorky
1663	Gortkirk
1767	Gortahurk
1813	Gortahork
_{(E.C.) - Escheated Counties Map 1609 (Charter) - Charter of Londonderry 1613}

== See also ==
- Kilcronaghan
- List of townlands in Tobermore
- Tobermore
