= Gortamney =

Townland in County Londonderry, Northern Ireland

- townland

Irish transcription(s)
  - Derivation: Gort an tSamhraidh
  - Meaning: "The summer field"
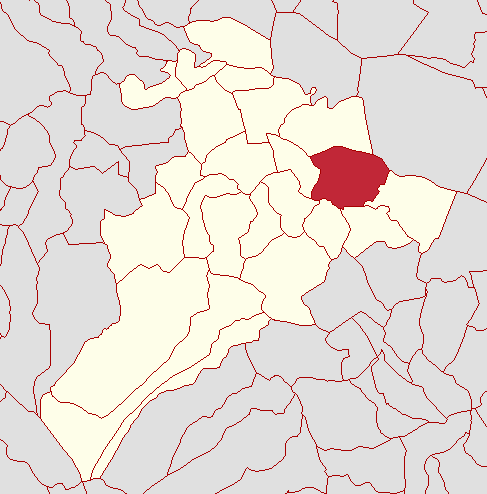

- Gortamney shown within Northern Ireland Gortamney (the United Kingdom)
- Coordinates: 54°48′04″N 6°40′41″W
- Sovereign state: United Kingdom
- Country: Northern Ireland
- County: County Londonderry
- Barony: Loughinsholin
- Civil parish: Kilcronaghan
- Plantation grant: Drapers Company and Crown freeholds
- First recorded: 1609

Government
  - Council: Mid Ulster District
  - Ward: Tobermore

Area
  - Total: 364.2 acres (147.37 ha)
- Irish grid ref: H8595

Gortamney (locally [ˌɡɔrˈtaːmni], from Irish Gort an tSamhraidh 'the summer field') is a townland lying within the civil parish of Kilcronaghan, County Londonderry, Northern Ireland. It lies in the east of the parish alongside the boundary of the civil parish of Termoneeny, and is bounded by the townlands of Ballinderry, Ballynahone More, Clooney, Drumsamney, Killynumber, Killytoney, and Moyesset. It was apportioned to the Drapers company and Crown freeholds.

The townland was part of Tobermore electoral ward of the former Magherafelt District Council, however in 1926 it was part of Tobermore district electoral division as part of the Maghera division of Magherafelt Rural District. It was also part of the historic barony of Loughinsholin.

== History ==
Population
Year	Pop.
1841	136
1851	112
1861	95
1871	98
1881	95
1891	85
1901	65
1911	91
1926	93

Size (acres, roods, poles)
Year	a, r, p
1851	372, 1, 12
1881	372, 2, 36
1901	372, 2, 36
1926	372, 2, 28

Earlier recorded forms
Year	Form
1609	Gortytuary (E.C.)
1613	Gortitawry (Charter)
1613	Gourt Tawrey
1622	Gort Tawey
1654	Gortitaumpher
1657	Gortitanry
1661	Gortitamphree
1663	Gortanry
1686	Gortimy
1813	Gortamney
_{(E.C.) - Escheated Counties Map 1609 (Charter) - Charter of Londonderry 1613}

== See also ==
- Kilcronaghan
- List of townlands in Tobermore
- Tobermore
