= Keenaght =

Keenaght may refer to:

- Keenaght (barony), County Londonderry, Northern Ireland
- Keenaght (townland), County Londonderry, Northern Ireland
