= Demographics of Tobermore =

The following gives details on the demographics of Tobermore village and Tobermore electoral ward from the 2001 and 2011 censuses.

== Tobermore village and townland ==
Tobermore is classified as a small village or hamlet. It spans the majority of the townland of Tobermore. In the 2001 Census there were 578 people living in Tobermore. In 2004 the population was estimated as being around 1,250 people.

On Census day (29 April 2001):

- 19.9% were aged under 16 years and 20.6% were aged 60 and over.
- 50.4% of the population were male and 49.7% were female.
- 3.1% were from a Roman Catholic background and 95.5% were from a Protestant background.
- 3.0% of people aged 16–74 were unemployed.
- 55.6% of residents have no qualifications and only 5.8% have a degree level education or higher.
- 3.8% of residents were born outside of Northern Ireland.
- 1.2% of residents are from an ethnic group other than white.

=== Early censuses ===
Early census figures give the following:

- 1831: 678 inhabitants of which 546 (80.53%) were Protestant and 132 were Roman Catholic (19.47%). This covers the village and the townland it is in.
- 1841: 749 inhabitants of which 525 live in the village.
- 1851: 583 inhabitants of which 445 live in the village.
- 1861: 673 inhabitants of which 561 live in the village.
- 1871: 595 inhabitants of which 528 live in the village.
- 1881: 408 inhabitants of which 347 live in the village.
- 1901: 440 inhabitants of which 420 (95.45%) were Protestant and 20 were Roman Catholic (4.55%). This covers the village and the townland it is in.
- 1911: 397 inhabitants of which 385 (96.98%) were Protestant and 12 were Roman Catholic (3.12%). This covers the village and the townland that it is in.
- 1926: 279 inhabitants of which 274 live in the village.

The large decrease between 1841 and 1851 can be attributed to the effects of the Great Famine in Ireland from 1845 to 1852. Despite an increase in the following decade the population steadily drops, decreasing by 72.75% between 1851 and 1926. The 2001 figure of 578 is still below the 1871 figure. Another trend is the decrease of people living outside the village boundaries within the townland of Tobermore, dropping from a high of 224 in 1841 to 5 in 1926.

== Tobermore electoral ward ==
The Tobermore electoral ward covers a wide area around the village of Tobermore, which spans right up to the borders of the neighbouring settlements of Desertmartin, Draperstown, and Maghera. In the 2011 census the "usual population" of Tobermore ward was 2,641, an increase of roughly 27.25% on the 2001 figure of 2,076, and an increase of 46.6% on the 1991 figure of 1,802.

=== Ethnic group ===
The following table depicts the ethnic makeup of the electoral ward in 2001 and 2011 and the changes:

Ethnic group	2001 Pop.	2001%	2011 Pop.	2011%	Change
White	2,063	99.37%	2,621	99.4%	+0.63%
Chinese	8	0.08%	6	0.23%	-25%
Irish traveller	3	0.145%	0	0%	-100%
Mixed	0	0%	5	0.19%	+100%
Other	3	0.145%	5	0.19%	+66.7%
Indian	0	0%	3	0.04%	+100%
Bangladeshi	0	0%	1	0.04%	+100%

=== Language ===
Of the 2,500 people in the electoral ward of the age of 3 or over, 319 (12.76%) had varying degrees of understanding and ability in Irish, whilst 292 (11.68%) had the same with Ulster Scots.

In regard to the amount of households (out of 898) with English as the main language:

- 879 had all people
- 12 had at least one person
- 1 had no one from the age of 16+, but at least one aged 3–15
- 6 had no one at all that speaks English as their main language.

=== National identity ===
Of the 2,461 people in Tobermore electoral ward the following national identities were given:

- TW - Tobermore ward
- MDC - Magherafelt district council
- NI - Northern Ireland

National identity	TW	TW %	MDC %	NI %
British only	1,273	48.2%	26.74%	39.89%
Irish only	591	22.35%	39.31%	25.26%
Northern Irish only	496	18.78%	23.94%	20.94%
British and Northern Irish	164	6.21%	3.27%	6.17%
British and Irish	9	0.34%	0.53%	0.66%
Irish and Northern Irish	36	1.36%	1.88%	1.06%
British, Irish, and Northern Irish	13	0.49%	0.5%	1.02%
Other	59	2.23%	3.83%	3.42%

The cumulative total of each would be: 1,459 (59.28%) gave British; 709 (28.81%) gave Northern Irish; 649 (26.37%) gave Irish; and 59 (2.23%) gave other. Due to being a cumulative tally, the total percentage will be higher than 100%.

=== Religious background brought up in ===
The following table details what religious background people stated that they were from.

Denomination	2001 Pop.	2001%	2011 Pop.	2011%	Change
Protestant or other Christian	1,354	65.22%	1,603	60.7%	+18.39%
Roman Catholic	710	34.20%	970	36.73%	+36.62%
Other religion	0	0%	22	0.83%	+100%
No religion	12	0.58%	46	1.74%	+383.33%
Total	2,076		2,641		

=== Religion declared ===
The following table details the religion or other that people identified themselves as being of.

Denomination	2001 Pop.	2001%	2011 Pop.	2011%	Change
Protestant or other Christian	1,275	62.8%	1,508	57.11%	+18.3%
Roman Catholic	684	32.95%	919	34.8%	+34.36%
Other religion	0	0%	20	0.76%	+100%
No religion or not stated	117	5.64%	194	7.34%	+65.8%
No religion	Counted with "Not stated"		106	4.01%	
Not stated	Counted with "No religion"		88	3.33%	
Total	2,076		2,641		

== Socio-economic profile ==
The 2001 main employment sectors in the electoral ward of Tobermore are: manufacturing (30%); construction (14%); retail (14%); health related (10%); public administration (6%) and full-time agriculture (4%).

Unemployment levels in the Tobermore ward have increased over the past two years to 3.5%, however remain below that of Magherafelt District Council (4.1%), Mid-Ulster Westminster parliamentary constituency (4.5%) and the Northern Ireland average (4.9%). Despite a decline in the employment domain over the past 10 years placing it within the 50% worst of all wards in Northern Ireland, Tobermore ward has the lowest level of unemployment and the highest level of self-employment in Northern Ireland.

The Tobermore ward area contains 59 farms, of which 7 farms are situated in less favoured areas. The average farm size is 80 hectares, which is larger than those found in the neighbouring wards of Draperstown and Lower Glenshane, which are more mountainous.

Tobermore ward has a high owner-occupier rate of 79%, which is above the Northern Ireland average of 69%. Reflecting the rurality of the area, 65% of homes are detached buildings.
