= Tullyroan =

- townland

Irish transcription(s)
  - Derivation: Tulaigh Uí Ruáin
  - Meaning: "O'Rowan's hill"
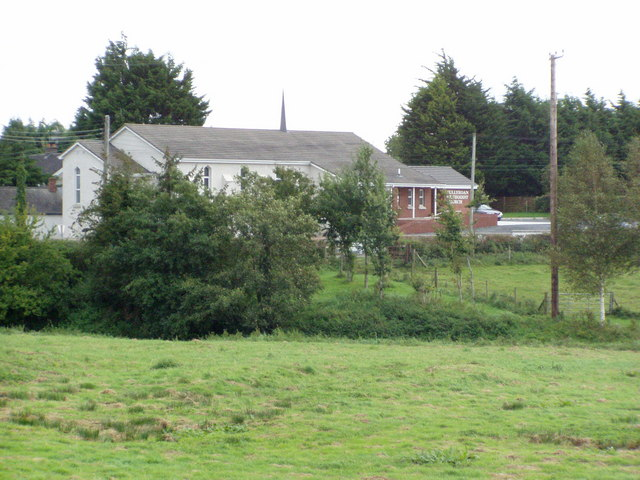
- Tullyroan Methodist Church

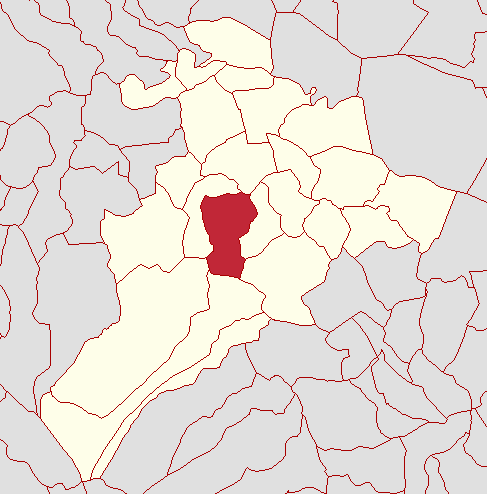

- Tullyroan shown within Northern Ireland Tullyroan (the United Kingdom)
- Coordinates: 54°47′35″N 6°43′05″W
- Sovereign state: United Kingdom
- Country: Northern Ireland
- County: County Londonderry
- Barony: Loughinsholin
- Civil parish: Kilcronaghan
- Plantation grant: Church lands
- First recorded: 1655

Government
  - Council: Mid Ulster District
  - Ward: Tobermore

Area
  - Total: 331.7 acres (134.22 ha)
- Irish grid ref: H8294

Tullyroan (locally [ˌtӧliˈrɔːən, -ˈrɔːnən] [sic]; Irish: Tulaigh Uí Ruáin, meaning 'O'Rowan's hill') is a townland lying within the civil parish of Kilcronaghan, County Londonderry, Northern Ireland. It lies in the centre of the parish and is bounded by the townlands of: Brackaghlislea, Calmore, Cloughfin, Coolsaragh, Gortahurk, Tamnyaskey. It wasn't apportioned to any of the London livery companies, being kept as church lands.

The townland was part of the Tobermore electoral ward of the former Magherafelt District Council, however in 1926 it was part of Tobermore district electoral division as part of the Maghera division of Magherafelt Rural District. It was also part of the former barony of Loughinsholin.

== Etymology ==
The townland of Tullyroan is derived from the Irish Tulaigh Uí Ruáin meaning "O'Rowan's hill". Tulaigh (or Tulach), which means "hillock/hill" likely refers to Belmount Hill which is in this townland. The second element could be of several different origins such as ruán in the sense of buckwheat, which grew well on small hills, or in the sense of red land or soil, of which Tullyroan contains a considerable amount of heath especially around Belmount Hill. Despite this it is postulated that it in fact derives from the name O'Rowan, a name found in western Ireland, however in the 1663 Hearth Money Rolls, a "Knogher O'Rome" (read as O'Roine) is recorded within this parish.

Belmount Hill in this townland is derived from the French Bel Mont, meaning "beautiful mountain".

== History ==
Along with the townlands of Granny, Mormeal, and Tamnyaskey, Tullyroan comprises the four townlands that make up the Bishop of Derrys lands in the parish. Prior to the Plantation of Ulster, these four townlands constituted the termon (or erenagh) land of the parish, and were known as "Ballintrolla, Derreskerdan, Dirrygrinagh et Kellynahawla". Despite these townlands being in the same location as the later townlands, it is now impossible to match their names accurately.

=== Statistics ===
Population
Year	Pop.
1841	198
1851	125
1861	144
1871	150
1881	113
1891	84
1901	58
1911	57
1926	63

Size (acres, roods, poles)
Year	a, r, p
1851	322, 2, 15
1881	324, 1, 4
1901	324, 1, 4
1926	324, 1, 15

Earlier recorded forms
Year	Form
1655-6	Tilleran 32 (D.S.)
1813	Tullyrone (S.M.)
_{(D.S.) Down Survey Map (S.M.) - Sampson's Map}

== See also ==
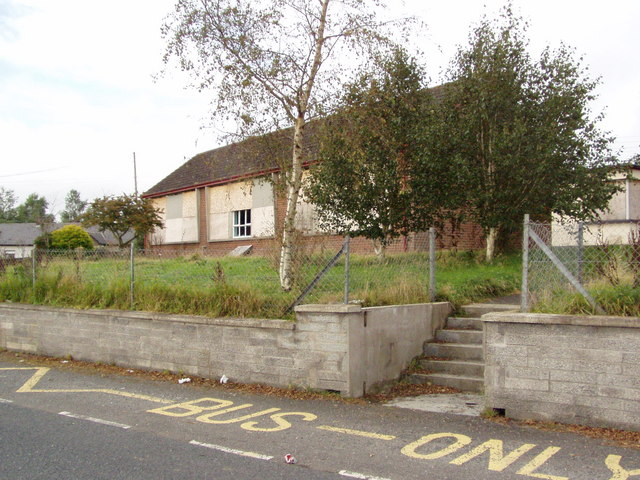
Tullyroan Primary School

- Kilcronaghan
- List of townlands in Tobermore
- Tobermore
