= List of townlands in Tobermore =

There are 37 townlands in Tobermore electoral ward, with 22 of these also constituting the parish of Kilcronaghan. All townlands below are listed with the earliest recorded date of their modern variation as well as the Irish origin if applicable, along with a select list of earlier variations with date.

== Kilcronaghan ecclesiastical and civil parish ==
Map depicting neighbouring settlements and boundaries of: * Kilcronaghan parish (blue), * Tobermore electoral ward (red), * associated townlands (gray)

There are 23 townlands in the ecclesiastical parish of Kilcronaghan. The civil parish however only contains 21, with Tullyroan and Drumballyhagan Clark being omitted. The townland of Keenaght is the only one that doesn't also form part of Tobermore electoral ward.

- Ballinderry
- Brackaghlislea
- Calmore
- Clooney
- Cloughfin
- Coolsaragh
- Drumballyhagan
- Drumballyhagan Clark
- Drumcrow
- Drumsamney
- Gortahurk
- Gortamney
- Granny
- Keenaght
- Killynumber
- Killytoney
- Moneyshanere
- Mormeal
- Moybeg Kirley
- Moyesset
- Tamnyaskey
- Tobermore
- Tullyroan

== Tobermore electoral ward ==
There are 37 townlands within Tobermore electoral ward, the majority of which (twenty-two) reside in Kilcronaghan parish. The rest form parts of neighbouring parishes. These additional townlands are:

Townland	Irish Origin	Meaning	Earlier recorded forms	Parish
Annagh & Moneysterlin (c1834)	Eanach & Mainister Uí Fhloinn	marsh island & O'Lynn's monastery	Lissanny (1609), Moyinisholin (1609), Annah (1613), Momisholm (1613), Monisholin (1613), Arrnagh (1654), Lysarny (1657), Annagh and Culcam (1659c)	Desertmartin
Ballynagown	Baile na nGamhna	townland of the calves		Desertmartin
Ballynahone Beg (1654)	Baile na hAbhann Beag	small townland of the river	Ballynehoune (1609), Ballmahoun (1613), Ballinehone (1624c), Ballinahowne Begg (1654), Bellinahownwoghteragh (1654), Boghmyhone (1663)	Maghera
Ballynahone Mor	Baile na hAbhann Mór	big townland of the river	Ballynehoune (1609), Ballmahoun (1613), Ballinehone (1624c), Bellinahownwoghteragh (1654), Boghmyhone (1663)	Termoneeny
Corick	Comharc	confluence of the waters		Ballynascreen
Craigadick (1657c)	Creag an Díogha	rock of the poor land	Cregada (1609), Cregduff (1654), Cregadig (1657c), Craigade (1813), Cregan Dige (1834c)	Maghera
Dromore (1613)	Droim Mór	big ridge	Drommore (1609), Drom'ore (1624c)	Desertmartin
Drumard (1654)	Droim Ard	high ridge	1/3 Dromard (1609), Dromard & Money Grogon (1613), Drumard Munyqugan (1654)	Ballynascreen
Duntibryan	Dún Tí Bhriain	fort of Bryan's homestead	Dountibrian (1609), Domituibrian (1613), Donte Brean (1613), Duntibrien (1654), Halfe Duntibrean (1654), Duntiburne (1663), Duntybryan (1813)	Ballynascreen
Glebe (1834c)		a tract of land belonging to a church		Ballynascreen
Gortnaskey (1661)	Gort na Sceach	field of the hawthornes	Gort Skeagh (1613), Gortneske (1654), Gortaskey (1659c), Gortnarkie (1663), Gortnaskea (1834c)	Ballynascreen
Moneyguiggy (1813)	Móin an Crithach; Móin na gCuigeadh; Móin Ui Cuaig(ead)	the shaking bog bog of the fifths O'Quiggs bog	Moynagogie 1/3 (1609), Monegog (1613), Moneguigie (1654), Half Moyneguigye (1659c), Monegingee (1661),	Ballynascreen
Mullagh	Mullach	hill-top		Termoneeny
Straw Mountain	Straith	marsh		Ballynascreen

== See also ==
- Kilcronaghan
- List of townlands in County Londonderry
- Tobermore
