= Cruithnechán =

Irish saint from the 6th century

Cruithnechán (Irish: Cruithneachán), also known as Cruithnechan, Crunathan, and Cronaghan, was an Irish saint from around the 6th century, known as one of the mentors of Columba, who founded the famous monastery at Iona.

Cruithnechán is mentioned briefly in Adomnán's 7th-century hagiographic life of Columba; he served as foster-father or tutor (nutritor) to the young Columba before the latter went on to study with Gemmán in Leinster, and later with Finnian at Movilla. An anecdote is told that Cruithnechán once saw a ball of fire hanging over Columba's head, while the boy was sound asleep. The miracle has been explained as representing a "typical motif used to show how teachers or parents were made aware of the precocious sanctity of their charges".

Adomnán does not mention a church for Cruithnechán, but the present-day parish of Kilcronaghan (Irish: Cill Chruithneacháin) in County Londonderry is thought to derive its name from what would have been his church there.

A number of later sources supply details lacking in Adomnán's account. The otherwise "austere" Middle Irish version of Columba's Life, which has been dated to the 12th century, identifies Cruithnechán as a son of one Cellachán, and says that he baptized the boy before he took him into fosterage. The story of Columba's upbringing had undergone further expansion by 1532 when County Donegal chieftain Manus O'Donnell produced the Betha Colaim Chille, a vernacular Life compiled from a range of sources. For instance, citing a poem ascribed to Mura of Fahan, it relates that Columba was sent to Temple Douglas, in the modern parish of Conwal, to be baptized by Cruithnechán mac Cellacháin, who then fostered the boy in Kilmacrenan, County Donegal.

The Acta Sanctorum Hiberniae by John Colgan lists his festival day as 7 March.

== See also ==
- Columba
- Kilcronaghan
