= Moneymore =

Village in County Londonderry, Northern Ireland

Coordinates: 54.692°N 6.670°W

Moneymore: Irish: Muine Mór
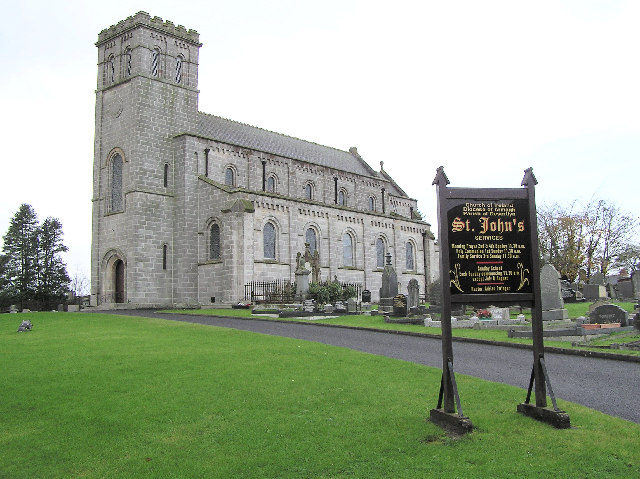
- St John's Desertlynn Church of Ireland, in Moneymore

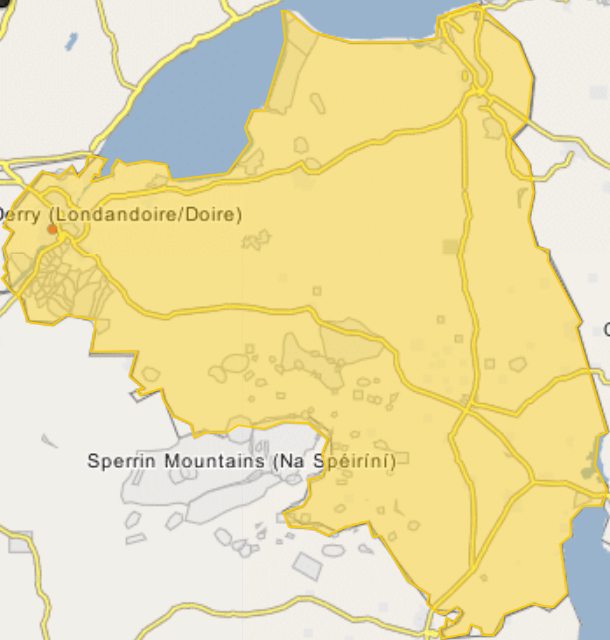
- Location within Northern Ireland
- Population: 1,897 (2011 census)
- Irish grid reference: H8583
- District: Mid-Ulster
- County: County Londonderry
- Country: Northern Ireland
- Sovereign state: United Kingdom
- Post town: MAGHERAFELT
- Postcode district: BT45
- Dialling code: 028
- Police: Northern Ireland
- Fire: Northern Ireland
- Ambulance: Northern Ireland
- UK Parliament: Mid Ulster
- NI Assembly: Mid Ulster

Moneymore (from Irish Muine Mór, meaning 'large thicket or large hill') is a village and townland in County Londonderry, Northern Ireland. It had a population of 1,897 in the 2011 census. It is situated within Mid-Ulster District. It is an example of a plantation village in Mid-Ulster built by the Drapers' Company of London.

== Geography ==
Moneymore lies in a glen. The Ballymully River flows through the southern part of the village. The river rises on a large hill, Slieve Gallion (one of the Sperrins), which has a radio tower on top. The village is about 35 miles (56.3 km) from the sea to the north.

== History ==
There was an important battle fought near Moneymore called the battle of Móin Daire Lothair in the year 563 between the Northern Uí Néill and the Cruithin tribe which the Northern Uí Néill won. This battle is recorded in the Annals of Ulster and would have been a major event at the time. Much of Great Britain and Ireland would have descent from these two groups as there was notable mixing with Scotland over the years and the Uí Néill split to form the Southern Uí Néill in the Irish midlands around this time.

During The Troubles, seven people were killed in or near Moneymore in violence related to the conflict, six of them by the Provisional IRA and one by the Ulster Defence Association.

== People ==
- Henry Conwell (c. 1748 – 22 April 1842), Roman Catholic bishop in the United States.
- Richard William Enraght, Anglican priest and religious controversialist. He was born in Moneymore on 23 February 1837, the son of the Reverend Matthew Enraght the Assistant Curate of the parish.
- John Harris, surgeon, early settler of Australia, born Moneymore 1754.

== Places of interest ==
The most notable building in the town is the 17th century Plantation house, Springhill House, built and owned by the Conyngham family (later Lenox-Conyngham) until 1957 when it came under the ownership of the National Trust.

Moneymore Model Village depicts life in rural Ulster at the time of the Plantation in the 17th century.

== Transport ==
- Moneymore railway station opened on 10 November 1856 and shut on 2 May 1955.

== Sport ==
- Moneymore GAC is the local Gaelic Athletic Association club.

== Schools ==
There are two primary schools in Moneymore: Moneymore Primary School (the state primary school) and St. Patrick's Primary School (a Roman Catholic primary school). Most children of secondary school age attend one of the schools in nearby Cookstown or Magherafelt.

== Churches ==
- St. John's Church (Church of Ireland)
- Church of SS John & Trea (Roman Catholic)
- Moneymore First Presbyterian Church
- Moneymore Second Presbyterian Church
- Moneymore Congregational Church
- Moneymore Gospel Hall

== Demography ==
=== 2001 census ===
Moneymore is classified as a village by the Northern Ireland Statistics and Research Agency (NISRA) (i.e. with population between 1,000 and 2,250 people). On census day (29 April 2001) there were 1,369 people living in Moneymore. Of these:

- 25.0% were aged under 16 years and 16.1% were aged 60 and over
- 45.29% of the population were male and 52.1% were female
- 47.8% were from a Catholic background and 51.0% were from a Protestant background;
- 3.1% of people aged 16–74 were unemployed.

=== 2011 census ===
On census day (27 March 2011) the usually resident population of Moneymore Settlement was 1,897 accounting for 0.10% of the NI total. In Moneymore Settlement, considering the resident population:

- 98.52% were from the white (including Irish Traveller) ethnic group
- 45.65% belong to or were brought up in the Catholic religion and 50.34% belong to or were brought up in a 'Protestant and Other Christian (including Christian related)' religion
- 50.03% indicated that they had a British national identity, 23.35% had an Irish national identity and 29.78% had a Northern Irish national identity
- 9.35% had some knowledge of Irish
- 7.32% had some knowledge of Ulster-Scots
- 3.38% did not have English as their first language

== See also ==
- Market houses in Northern Ireland
