= Calmore =

Townland in County Londonderry, Northern Ireland

- townland

Irish transcription(s)
  - Derivation: An Coll Mór
  - Meaning: "The great/large hazel"
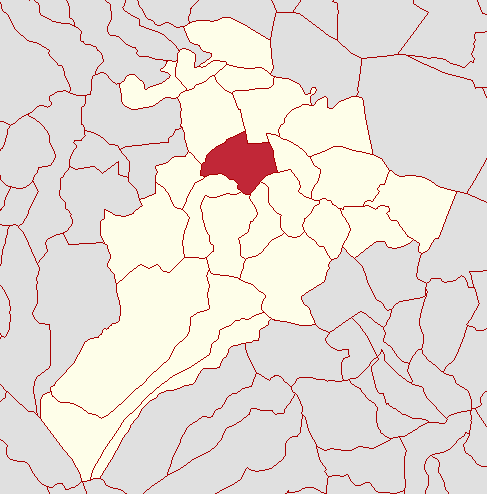

- Calmore shown within Northern Ireland Calmore (the United Kingdom)
- Coordinates: 54°48′21″N 6°42′39″W
- Sovereign state: United Kingdom
- Country: Northern Ireland
- County: County Londonderry
- Barony: Loughinsholin
- Civil parish: Kilcronaghan
- Plantation grant: Drapers Company and Crown freeholds
- First recorded: 1609
- Settlements: Tobermore

Government
  - Council: Mid Ulster District
  - Ward: Tobermore

Area
  - Total: 279.0 acres (112.90 ha)
- Irish grid ref: H829961

Calmore (from Irish An Coll Mór, meaning 'the great/large hazel') is a townland lying within the civil parish of Kilcronaghan, County Londonderry, Northern Ireland. It lies in the north-west of the parish, and is bounded by the townlands of; Granny, Moneyshanere, Moyesset, and Tobermore. It was apportioned to the Drapers company as well as Crown freeholds.

The townland was part of Tobermore electoral ward of the former Magherafelt District Council, however in 1926 it was part of Tobermore district electoral division as part of the Maghera division of Magherafelt Rural District. It was also part of the historic barony of Loughinsholin.

== History ==
The townland of Calmore is named after a large ancient hazel tree that was said to have been used in pagan ceremonies.

=== Calmore crannog ===
The townland of Calmore appears to have formerly been a place of some importance, attested by a crannog that once lay in an ancient lake in the townland. This crannog is stated as having been of a tolerable large size and constructed of an oak frame, composed of large logs and planks bound together by wooden pins. This frame was enclosed by long poles, standing upright and fastened by mortices. In April 1835, at the crannog, a flat bottomed boat of oak was discovered, containing several oak boards that served as seats. This boat appeared to have had no nail or iron work, being completely hallowed out from the trunk of a tree. In the 1780s a smaller boat of similar construction had also been found, but had been scuttled and sunk several times. It is stated that these boats may have been either pleasure or fishing boats belonging to Calmore Castle.

The crannog was dismantled in the early 19th century.

=== Calmore castle ===
Calmore Castle was an ancient castle that once stood in the townland of Calmore. It has been formerly known as O'Hagan's Castle and Rowley's Castle.

The O'Hagans of Ballinascreen when being questioned by John O'Donovan in 1821 as part of his letters pertaining to the antiquities of County Londonderry, claimed that Sir William O'Hagan built Calmore Castle. Local traditions however picked up by the Ordnance Survey Memoirs of 1836-37 state that it was his father, Shane More O'Hagan, who built it. Shane More O'Hagan is noted as being the proprietor of the Drapers Proportion in this area together with other tracts of land, including ten townlands in Ballynascreen and Lough Insholin [sic], the heart of a large territory of the same name.

The Ordnance Survey Memoirs note that in neighbouring Moneyshanere, a battle was said to have been fought between the O'Hagans who are stated as ruling Tobermore and the O'Neills of Tyrone, who are said to have come rampaging down from Ballynascreen. During its control by the O'Hagans, Calmore Castle was considered "once a place of very considerable strength, which commanded the mountain passes, and the fords of the Moyola".

After Sir William O'Hagan, Calmore Castle was inhabited by Owen Roe O'Hagan, who after which it is said to have been burned down. By 1619, a plantation house was built for William Rowley, which incorporated parts of Calmore Castle. Rowley was the brother of John Rowley, former chief agent of The Honourable The Irish Society, and later for the Drapers Company. Shortly after the 1641 rebellion, it fell back into Irish hands. In 1689, it was burnt by a party of the Jacobite army retreating from the Siege of Derry.

A tradition is recorded claiming that two years after it was burnt down, the very person who led the party and was the first to throw a sheaf of burning straw into the rooms, came begging to the windows of the partly repaired building. When he was recognised he was immediately "stalled" by Rowley himself. The last inhabitant of the estate was Henry Rowley in 1814, but was still listed as "Rowley's Castle" in Civil Survey maps from 1850. The plantation house that succeeded Calmore Castle no longer exists. Its remains were carried off by a local tenant, John McKee, for building work.

=== Townland statistics ===
The town of Tobermore lies partially in this townland, and those of Moneyshanere, Moyesset, and Tobermore.

Population
Year	Pop.
1841	215
1851	185
1861	190
1871	169
1881	169
1891	69
1901	54 ^{[a]}
1911	342 ^{[b]}
1926	98
^[a] - decrease is attributed to emigration and removals^[b] - along with townlands of Moneyshanere and Tobermore, population counted as part of total for Tobermore town.

Size (acres, roods, poles)
Year	a, r, p
1851	283, 2, 10
1881	284, 1, 26
1901	284, 1, 26
1926	283, 0, 2

Earlier recorded forms
Year	Form
1609	Calemore (E.C.)
1613	Call Moore
1613	Culemoire (Charter)
1622	Coolmor
1645c	san Chall M-r
1654	Kallmore
1659c	Calmoore & Cloghfin
1663	Culmore
1767	Calmore
1834c	Caul-more
_{(E.C.) - Escheated Counties Map 1609 (Charter) - Charter of Londonderry 1613}

== See also ==
- Kilcronaghan
- List of townlands in Tobermore
- Tobermore
