= Desertmartin (parish) =

- parish

Irish transcription(s)
  - Derivation: Díseart Mhartain
  - Meaning: "hermitage of St. Martin"
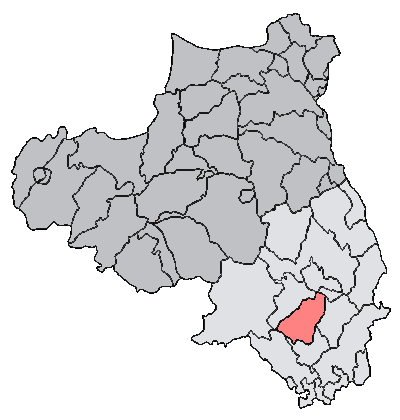

- Desertmartin shown within Northern Ireland
- Sovereign state: United Kingdom
- Country: Northern Ireland
- County: Londonderry
- Barony: Loughinsholin
- Settlements / Townlands: Desertmartin, Cullion; townlands: 24

Desertmartin (from Irish Díseart Mhartain 'hermitage of St. Martin') is a civil and ecclesiastical parish in County Londonderry, Northern Ireland. Containing one major settlement, Desertmartin, it is bordered by the civil parishes of Ballynascreen, Desertlyn, Kilcronaghan, Lissan, Maghera, and Magherafelt. It lies within the former barony of Loughinsholin and is situated in Magherafelt District Council. As a Church of Ireland parish it is within the Diocese of Derry and Raphoe.

== Topography ==
The parish of Desertmartin lies at the foot of Slieve Gallion, on the easternmost limit of the Sperrin Mountains range. Slieve Gallion rises to an elevation of 1,730 feet (530 m) and is near the south-western boundary of the parish. The rest of the parish is comparatively low averaging around 270 feet (82 m) above sea level, and in its easterly descent from Slieve Gallion is broken by small glens and ravines, such as; Reuben's, Gortanewry, and Quilly.

The main hills in the parish are; Slieve Gallion Cairn, 1,625 feet (495 m) high; Brackamore Hill, 418 feet (127 m) high; Windy Castle, 1,216 feet (371 m) high; Tirgan Rock, 590 feet (180 m) high.

Desertmartin has no river flowing through it, however does contain several small streams, the principal of which is the Grange (also known as the Desertmartin River), which after a course of 5 miles (8.0 km) discharges into the River Moyola.

Desertmartin also contains a lake, Loughinsholin (from Irish Loch Inse Ui Fhloinn 'lough of O'Lynns island'), which contained an artificial island on which was situated a fort. This fort was the seat of the Ó Floinn (O'Lynn) dynasty, who also gave their name to the townland of Moneysterlin (from Irish Mainister Uí Fhloinn 'O'Lynns monastery') in the parish.

== History ==
The civil parish of Desertmartin derives its name from the ecclesiastical parish, which in turn is named after an ancient church allegedly built as a retreat by St. Columba in the 6th century in honour of St. Martin. This gave its name in Irish; Díseart Mhartain, the hermitage of St. Martin. It is also recorded however that it was built by St. Martin instead.

=== Loughinsholin ===
At some stage a crannog (an artificial island) was built in the only lough within the parish, lying in the townlands of Anagh and Stranagard. This lake would be later called Loughinsholin (from Irish Loch Inse Ui Fhloinn 'lough of O'Lynns island'), and the name is preserved to this day as the name of the barony of Loughinsholin.

The Ó Floinn (O'Lynn) sept came to prominence in the Airgiallan client-kingdom of Ui Tuirtri, with their power-base situated at Loughinsholin. In 1178 the O'Lynns were almost "exterminated" by the Ó Cathaín (O'Kanes) who attacked and plundered their territory. The O'Lynns would however recover and extend their power all the way to Carrickfergus and the north-Antrim coast, until the 1350s when the Clandeboye O'Neills stepped into the power-vacuum left by the collapse of the Earldom of Ulster and expanded to encompass all of Ui Tuirtri.

The last recorded lord of Loughinsholin was Brian Carrach O'Neill from a branch of the Clandeboye O'Neills. His residence lay in the neighbouring parish of Ballynascreen. His daughter Anne, was the second wife of last prince of Clandeboye, Shane MacBryan O'Neill of Edenduffcarrick, later known as Shane's Castle, Antrim. Brian Carrach died in 1586.

The Flight of the Earls in 1607 saw the confiscation of the earls forfeited lands, which were then granted to the City of London Corporation and its livery companies to undertake its development as part of the Plantation of Ulster. In 1609 it is recorded that a fort was erected on the Loughinsholin crannog by Sir Josiah Bodley, who accompanied Sir Arthur Chichester, and his army, when they were marching throughout the confiscated lands.

In 1613, the barony of Loughinsholin which had been created during the reign of Elizabeth I, and which was part of County Tyrone, was combined with County Coleraine and several environs to become County Londonderry.

Shane More O'Hagan of Tullyhogue would later marry a lady of the O'Lynns and take up residence in the O'Lynns seat in Loughinsholin. During the Irish Rebellion of 1641 Cormac O'Hagan lead a rebel force that took possession of Moneymore and looted the village and the Draper's Company's Castle. In response Cormac O'Hagan would have to defend Loughinsholin from the English, when it was ineffectively attacked twice by cannon.

The following year, 1642, Sir John Clotsworthy, whose residence was in Moneymore, retook Moneymore, and twice attacked Loughinsholin, first in April, and then again in August when they diverted a local stream and drained the lake. Sir John Clotsworthy would recover the valuables looted by Cormac O'Hagan from the castle and his residence and burn Cormac O'Hagans residence to the ground.

Other than Loughinsholin, the O'Lynns would also give their name to the townland of Moneysterlin (from Irish Mainistir Ui Fhloinn 'O'Lynns monastery'), which lies near the lough, and is said to have been built for the O'Lynn wife of Shane More O'Hagan, as well as the neighbouring parish of Desertlyn (from Irish Díseart Ui Fhloinn 'hermitage of O'Lynn').

== Townlands ==
- Annagh
- Ballymacpherson
- Ballynagown
- Boveagh
- Brackagh Slieve Gallion
- Carncose
- Cranny
- Cullion
- Curr
- Dromore
- Durnascallon
- Gortanewry
- Grange
- Iniscarn
- Killyboggin
- Knocknagin
- Lecumpher
- Longfield
- Luney
- Moneysterlin and Annagh
- Motalee
- Rosgarran
- Roshure
- Stranagard
- Tirgan

== See also ==
- Desertmartin
- Saint Columba
- Saint Martin
- List of civil parishes of County Londonderry
