= Slieve Gallion =

Mountain in Northern Ireland, easternmost of the Sperrins

- Sliabh gCallann
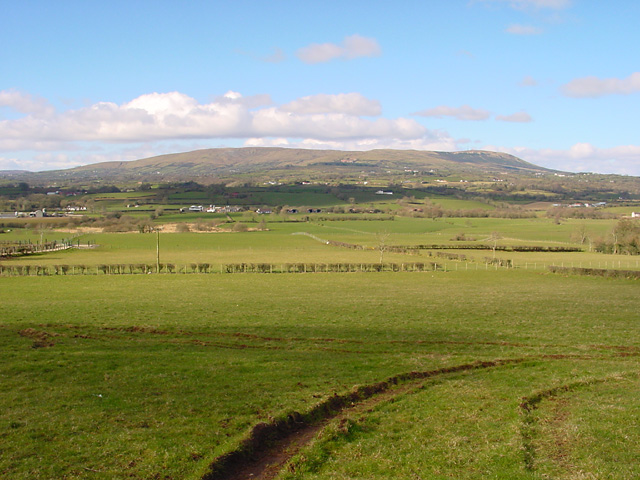
- Slieve Gallion from the southwest

Highest point
- Elevation: 528 m (1,732 ft)
- Listing: Marilyn
- Coordinates: 54°44′N 6°46′W

Naming
- English translation: mountain of the heights
- Language of name: Irish

Geography
- Location within Northern Ireland
- Location: County Londonderry, Northern Ireland
- OSI/OSNI grid: H8188
- Topo map: OSNI Discoverer 13

Slieve Gallion (Irish: Sliabh gCallann) is a mountain in County Londonderry, Northern Ireland. It is the easternmost of the Sperrin Mountains. It reaches a height of 528 metres (1,732 ft) and dominates the western shore of Lough Neagh. Its prominent northeastern summit has a transmitter station with a small road leading to it, and stands at a height of 496 metres (1,627 ft).

By road, Slieve Gallion is 4 miles (6.4 km) from Moneymore, 8 miles (13 km) from Cookstown, and 8 miles (13 km) from Magherafelt. The mountain is part of the parishes of Desertmartin, Lissan and Ballinascreen.

== Landscape ==
Slieve Gallion is a volcanic plug. The mountain is formed from volcanic-derived igneous rock, and also granite on the southern slopes. It is steep, and has a flat top. There is a telecommunications mast on the northeastern summit. To the west, the landscape consists of blanket bog and coniferous forest; most of the trees in the Slieve Gallion area are Sitka spruce. There are also lodgepole pine trees, as well as oak towards the south of the area. Animal species living in the area include the Irish hare (a sub-species of the mountain hare), the curlew, and the red grouse. The otter can also be found around nearby rivers. Slieve Gallion is classed by the Northern Ireland Planning Service as an area of "High Scenic Value".

Peat formed at Slieve Gallion in the early Holocene period, around 10,000 years ago. The radiocarbon dating of pollen has shown that there were plants in the area 10,000 years ago. 7,000 ago, the number of alder trees steeply increased.

== History ==
The earliest reference to Slieve Gallion is from the 7th century, in the Book of Armagh, where it is called Collunt Patricii, likely meaning "the height of Saint Patrick". This later became Sliabh gCallann, the first element meaning "mountain". A folk etymology is that it means "Callan's mountain", and legend has it that a giant named Callann Mór is buried at Carnanbane on the west side of the mountain.

From the Middle Ages until the 20th century, gatherings were held on the mountain to mark the festival of Lughnasadh. In recent decades, there has been an increase in the number of sheep grazing in the area, as well as an increase in mountain biking and hill walking, contributing to erosion.

== Sport ==
There was formerly a challenge walk/run from the village of Moneymore to the summit of Slieve Gallon, which took participants through idyllic countryside such as Cairndaisy glen and the Postmans Way. There is now a yearly mountain race from the foot of Inniscarn Forest to the mountaintop and back, which normally takes place on the last Saturday of September or the first Saturday of October. Organised under the Northern Ireland Mountain Running Association, this event attracts some of Northern Ireland's top athletes and hosted the British & Ireland Junior Mountain Running Championships in October 2006.

The sports of hang gliding and paragliding use Slieve Gallion. This site is considered a good starting point to go cross-country as there is little in the way of airspace restrictions in a downwind direction from its predominate flyable faces.

== Other ==
In 2019 a wind farm was constructed on its eastern side known as Crockandun wind farm.

Australian Gold firm Walkabout resources could collaborate with Koza UK to start a gold mine on the mountain. As of August 2020 the joint venture only holds a prospecting license and has not submitted plans for a gold mine. The project has been rejected by the district council of Mid Ulster.

== See also ==
- TSS Slieve Gallion, a twin-screw steam cargo vessel named after the mountain
