= Tobermore =

Village in County Londonderry, Northern Ireland

Coordinates: 54.811°N 6.707°W

Tobermore: Irish: An Tobar Mór
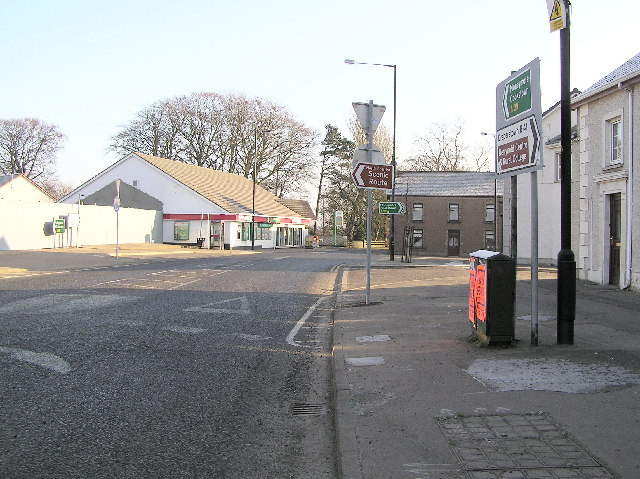
- The village centre

- Location within Northern Ireland
- Population: 713 (2021 census)
- Irish grid reference: H8396
  - Belfast: 34 mi (55 km)
- District: Mid-Ulster
- County: County Londonderry
- Country: Northern Ireland
- Sovereign state: United Kingdom
- Post town: MAGHERAFELT
- Postcode district: BT45
- Dialling code: 028
- Police: Northern Ireland
- Fire: Northern Ireland
- Ambulance: Northern Ireland
- UK Parliament: Mid Ulster
- NI Assembly: Mid Ulster

Tobermore (/ˌtʌbərˈmɔːr/), from Irish An Tobar Mór, meaning 'the great well') is a small village in County Londonderry, Northern Ireland, named after the townland of Tobermore. The village, which has a predominantly Protestant population, lies 2.5 miles (4.0 km) south-south-west of Maghera and 5.5 miles (8.9 km) north-west of Magherafelt. Tobermore is within the civil parish of Kilcronaghan and is part of Mid-Ulster District. It was also part of the former barony of Loughinsholin.

Tobermore has won the Best Kept Small Village award four times and the Best Kept Large Village award in 1986. In September 2011, Tobermore won the Translink Ulster in Bloom village category for the third year in a row.

== Etymology ==
Tobermore is named after the townland of Tobermore which is an anglicisation of the Irish words tobar meaning "well" and mór meaning "big/great", thus Tobermore means "big/great well". During the seventeenth century, Tobermore was also known as Tobarmore and Tubbermore, with Tubbermore being the preferred usage of the Masonic Order even to this day.

== Topography ==
Tobermore lies on the descending slope of Slieve Gallion. Prominent hills are: Calmore Hill (in Calmore), 268 feet (82 m); and Fortwilliam (in Tobermore), 200 feet (61 m) high.

A large oak tree called the Royal Oak grew near Calmore Castle in Tobermore. Until it was destroyed in a heavy storm, the Royal Oak was said to have been so large that horsemen on horseback could not touch one another with their whips across it. From this vague description, it is conjectured that the Royal Oak was about 10 feet (3.0 m) in diameter or 30 feet (9.1 m) in circumference. Another oak tree that once grew near Tobermore was so tall and straight that it was known as the Fishing Rod. Tradition is that all of the townlands were once covered with magnificent oak trees.

The Moyola River runs from west to east half a mile to the north of Tobermore village, heading through the townlands of Ballynahone Beg and Ballynahone More. In these two townlands lies Ballynahone Bog, one of the largest lowland raised bogs in Northern Ireland.

== History ==
=== Origins ===
The earliest reference to the actual settlement of Tobermore is in the mid-18th century of a house built in 1727 that belonged to a James Moore. At some point in the 18th century, the fair that was held at the Gort of the parish church was relocated to Tobermore, which is described as consisting of only Moore's house and a few mud huts. The development and growth of the village can be traced back to this period.

=== Pre-modern history ===
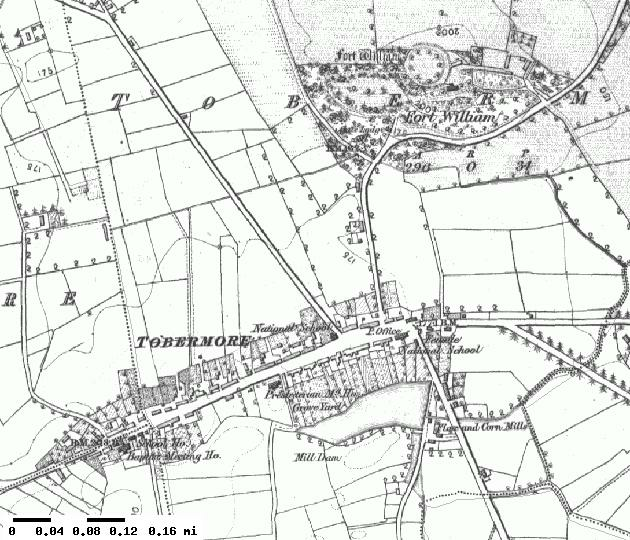
Ordnance Survey map of Tobermore and Fortwilliam Rath from 1850. Copyright © Crown

==== Fortwilliam Hill ====
Fortwilliam Hill is situated between the Fortwilliam, Lisnamuck, and Maghera roads in Tobermore, overlooking the River Moyola. Upon it lies Fortwilliam rath, which was built c. 700–1000 AD, and Fortwilliam House, a listed building, built in 1795 by John Stevenson Esq of "The Stevensons the Linen People". The rath was historically known under variations of Donnagrenan, which is most likely derived from the Irish Dún na Grianán, meaning "fort of the eminent place". Its modern name like that of the adjacent house were bestowed upon them by Mr. Jackson, who named it after Fort William, Scotland, which was named in honour of King William III in 1690. A contradictory reason mentioned by John O'Donovan is that the O'Hagans of Ballynascreen claimed it was built and named for Sir William O'Hagan, however, O'Donovan discounts their claims due to other claims they make that are contrary to reality.

Fortwilliam rath is presently described as a well-preserved semi-defensive high status monument, built to withstand passing raids, being relatively large at 30 meters in diameter. It is also declared a monument of regional importance giving it statutory protective status. Fortwilliam House was described by John MacCloskey in 1821 as having a commanding position and being amongst the most pleasing of buildings and the most prominent in the district.

==== Presbyterian congregation ====
The first Presbyterian congregation that serviced Tobermore and the general Loughinsholin barony area was founded in Knockloughrim in 1696.

In 1736, an application was made to the Presbyterian Synod of Ulster to create a congregation in Tobermore. This initial request was denied as it would have depleted the congregation in neighbouring Maghera. In 1737 a renewed application was made with "such a strong case" put forward it was accepted by the Synod. It was requested that some of the people who would fall under the new congregation be at least eight miles from Maghera.

The boundaries between the congregations of Maghera and Tobermore were to be the Moyola River, from Newforge Bridge to Corrin Bridge. In 1743 however, nineteen families from Ballynahone, which straddles the Moyola River, were transferred from Maghera into the Tobermore congregation. The fourth minister of the Tobermore congregation, the Reverend William Brown, saw the need for the formation of a new congregation in Draperstown and facilitated its development in 1835 despite meaning losing around 70 families from his Tobermore congregation.

==== Volunteers and yeomanry ====
In November 1780, a meeting was convened of the Tobermore Volunteer company, commanded by John Stevenson, at which the Reverend James Whiteside preached.

At several points during the 19th century, the British parliament commissioned reports listing the Yeomanry officers of Ireland. For Tobermore the following are listed:

- 1804 report - Kilcronaghan division of the Loughinsholin Battalion: Captain James Stephenson, commissioned 5 November 1803; Lieutenant Robert Bryan, commissioned 13 March 1804; and Samuel M'Gown (McGowan), also commissioned on 13 March 1804.
- 1825 report - Tobermore corps: Captain James Stevenson, commissioned 18 November 1808. No lieutenants are listed.
- 1834 report - "Tobbermore" corps: Captain James Stevenson, commissioned 18 November 1808; Lieutenant John Stevenson, commissioned 5 March 1831; and Lieutenant H. Stevenson.

==== Non-payment of rents ====
During the early nineteenth century, the inhabitants of Tobermore are recorded as having displayed a very unruly disposition towards the payment of their rents towards their landlord Mr. Miller of Moneymore. It is stated that the inhabitants resisted the "pounding of their cattle, executed by him, with pitchforks and sundry other primitive implements of warfare". When they found that resistance was useless they employed Mr. Costello, one of the orators of the Corn Exchange to litigate their cause at the Magherafelt sessions, but here they were also unsuccessful.

A chancery lawsuit going on between Ball and Co. of Dublin and Sir George Hill operated as an obstruction to the improvement of the village as it stood upon the estate disputed with non-payment of rents. The main reason for the non-payment was that the tenants didn't believe they had sufficient security in their rent receipts to prevent repetition for the same year's rent. During the same period, it is noted that there was no illicit distillation of alcohol and no outrages for many years in the village except for a few assaults in the street on those who came to collect the rent. After the repayment of rents resumed it was remarked that "they were so long free of rent, none of them became in the end, the least degree richer", this may have been because as it was also remarked "their rent money which if saved every year would have secured some of them a comfortable competence found its way to the whiskey shops of the village and neighbourhood".

==== Orange and Temperance Hall ====
Tobermore Orange and Temperance Hall was built in 1888 by Andrew Johnston of Aghagaskin, Magherafelt. It is used for band practices and also by several organisations: Orange Order lodges 131 and 684; Royal Black Preceptory lodge 390; the Tobermore Walker Club of the Apprentice Boys of Derry; and Tobermore Masonic Lodge.

=== Modern history ===
==== Home Rule ====
The major issue in Ireland at the end of the nineteenth century and the start of the twentieth century was Irish Home Rule. In 1893 Viscount Templeton formed the first Unionist Clubs to coordinate opposition against Home Rule. Hiram Parkes Wilkinson, the son of Sir Hiram Shaw Wilkinson, would found the Tobermore Unionist Club.

The Rev. J. Walker Brown in 1912 released an anti-Home Rule pamphlet titled The Siege of Tobermore, where he details how best to defend Tobermore should "the enemy" march upon the village in a manner similar to that of the Siege of Derry.

Tobermore also receives a mention in the third verse of the anti-Home Rule ballad titled The Union Cruiser.

==== World War I ====
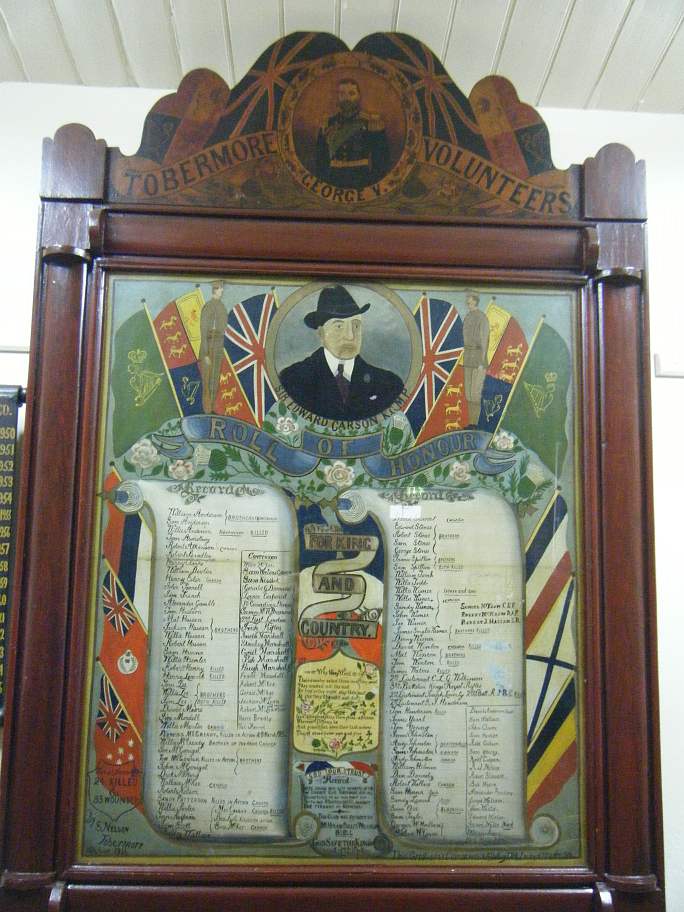
The Tobermore Unionist Club Roll of Honour of WWI volunteers, painted by S. Nelson of Tobermore. On the bottom left it reads: "121 served, 24 killed & 33 wounded".

During World War I, 121 inhabitants of Tobermore, out of a population of around 350, enlisted with the Ulster Division, with the Mid Ulster Mail reporting that "This loyal little village has a war record that is perhaps unique". Of those who enlisted, 24 were killed and 33 were wounded.

The names of those who volunteered are preserved on a Roll of Honour painted by local man, Samuel Nelson, and was unveiled by Denis Henry, MP for South Londonderry. This Roll of Honour resides in Tobermore Orange & Temperance Hall.

In Tobermore's Presbyterian graveyard lies the headstone of Bobbie Wisner, who died of natural causes at home in 1915. As he had trained and drilled with his adult comrades in the 36th Ulster Division, and was held in such high esteem, he was buried with full military honours.

==== Anglo-Irish War ====
During the period of the Belfast Troubles (1920–1922), there was an attempt on 2 April 1921 to blow up the bridge over the Moyola River outside Tobermore. On 19 March 1922 the bridge was again damaged by explosives. Four days later a flax mill was burned down also.

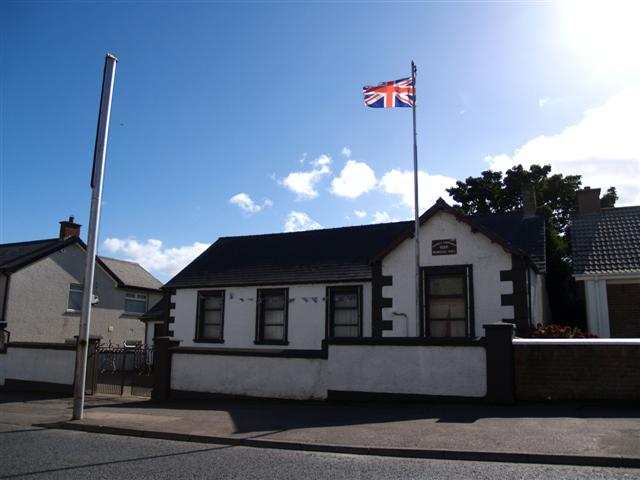
Orange Hall, 2007

In response, the Orange Hall on Main Street effectively became a barracks used by members of the Ulster Special Constabulary (USC). Sandbagged positions were set up in the centre of the village, with 17 men mobilized to form the local platoon.

On 26 May of that year the makeshift barracks was briefly attacked by the Irish Republican Army. No casualties were reported after police returned fire and the IRA men withdrew, though it was later felt necessary to fit steel shutters to the windows. The specials platoon lasted for six months before being stood down.

==== Victory Day ====
In 1946, Tobermore held a World War II Victory Fete. The Constitution newspaper states: "It was the first venture of its kind held in South Derry, and it was also among the first organised 'Victory Day' celebrations to take place in the Province. Not only that, but Tobermore's 'Victory Salute' to that great achievement which crowned the Allied arms so magnificently little over a year ago, was availed of to give practical expression to the pride which the people of South Derry generally take..." The Constitution also states: "In the preparatory arrangements nothing was left undone to ensure that it would prove a resounding success and certainly Tobermore's Victory Fete will long be regarded as one of the most memorable ventures in the district."

The Victory Fete was attended by Sir Ronald Ross, MP for the City and County of Londonderry, the band of the 1st Battalion Royal Ulster Rifles and the local units of the Maghera and Tobermore Army Cadet Force.

==== The Troubles ====
During the modern Troubles, Tobermore came under an area known by some as the Murder triangle. All of the people killed in the Tobermore area were Protestant:

- Samuel Porter (30), killed 22 November 1972 by the IRA, Nelson was a member of the Ulster Defence Regiment, and was shot dead outside his home in Ballynahone while off-duty.
- Noel Davis (22), killed 24 May 1975 by the INLA. Davis was a member of the Royal Ulster Constabulary. He was murdered by a booby trapped bomb in an abandoned car in Ballynahone, outside Tobermore.
- Alexander Watters (62), killed 16 March 1977 - A civilian, Watters was shot dead whilst cycling along the road between Tobermore and Draperstown. It is not known what group killed him or for what reason.

On 7 September 1968, divisions of the Ulster Protestant Volunteers, paraded through Tobermore. It consisted of eight bands and around 450 people, most of whom wore Ulster Constitution Defence Committee sashes. Ian Paisley and Free Presbyterian ministers featured prominently in the parade.

In October 1972, an Ulster Vanguard political rally was held in Tobermore, where Ulster Unionist Party deputy leader, John Taylor, made a speech on the use of violence stating: "We should make it clear that force means death and fighting, and whoever gets in our way, whether republicans or those sent by the British government, there would be killings".

There were four bomb hoaxes in Tobermore during 2010 the most recent on 29 July 2010 and 19 August 2010, both found in the centre of the village causing a lot of traffic disruption and resulting in people being evacuated from their homes.

==== 21st century ====
On 29 July 2006, Ronald Mackie, who was visiting from Scotland to attend a loyalist band parade in nearby Maghera, was kicked and beaten before being run over and killed after a row flared during a disco held at Tobermore United Football Club. Four men were charged and two; John Richard Stewart, from Maghera, and Paul Johnston, from Castledawson, were later convicted of manslaughter.

On 16 August 2008, over twelve hours of torrential rain caused the Moyola River to burst its banks and saw the flooding of the main Tobermore-Maghera road, the neighbouring football club buildings and pitch of Tobermore United F.C. and Tobermore Golf Driving Range.

== Local culture ==
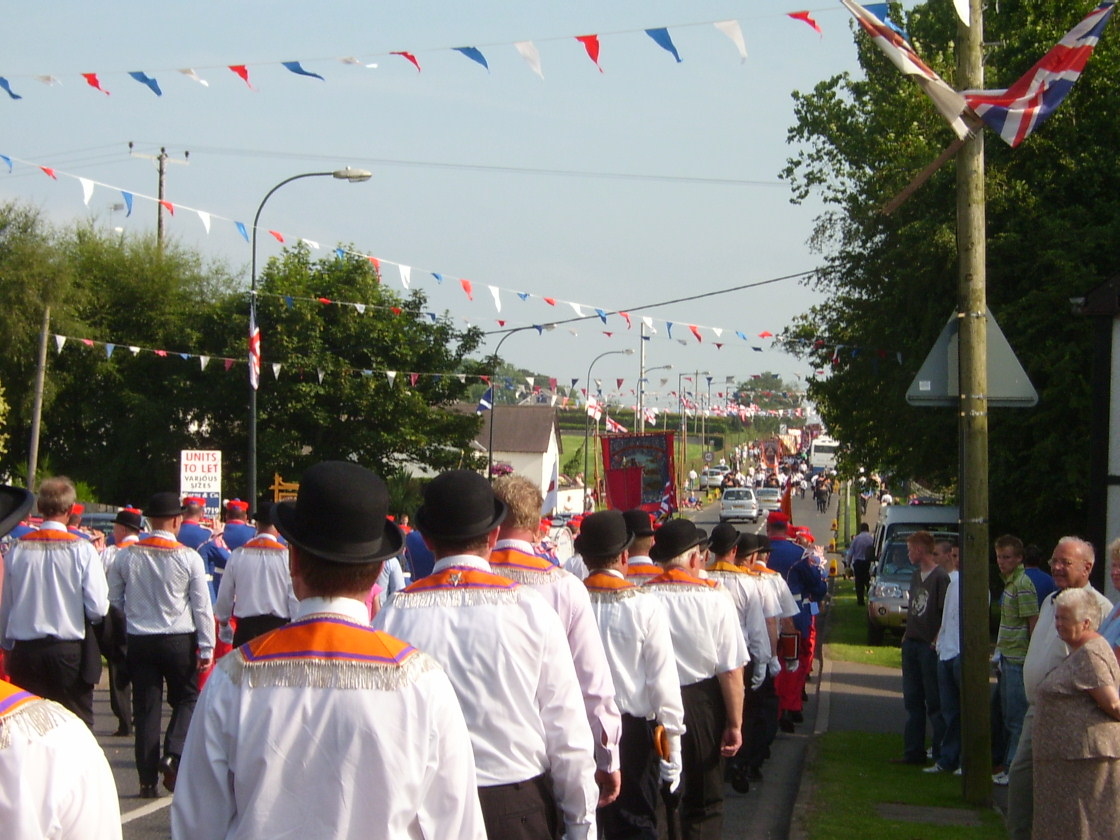
12 July Orange parade in Tobermore, 2005

Every seven years the 12 July Orange Order parade for the region is held in Tobermore, the most recent being 2022. In 2005, The Twelfth in Tobermore saw the participation of the Birmingham Sons of William LOL 1003 from Birmingham, Alabama. As with many other settlements in Northern Ireland, Tobermore has what is known as the Eleventh Night, the night before the 12 July Orange Order celebrations. The traditional activities of the Eleventh Night include the playing of Lambeg drums, the parading of the town by the local blood and thunder band and the lighting of a bonfire.

=== Local bands ===
Tobermore also contains two flute bands; Tobermore Loyal F.B. and Blackhill F.B., both of which partake in the Unionist Marching season. Previous bands include Tobermore Flute Band which was founded shortly after 1855 and was in existence until 1914 when it disbanded due to World War I. It reformed after the war in 1918 and played until 1934. In 1934 the Duke of York Accordion Band was formed. In 1981 an 85-year-old ticket for "A Grand Ball" in connection with Tobermore Flute Band was sent to the Mid-Ulster Mail for publication. This ball was held on Friday evening, 23 October 1896.

Millrow Flute Band was a former Tobermore blood and thunder band, founded in the early 1970s, disbanding in 2000. It was during the 70s that the blood and thunder style became popular with loyalist bands. Millrow used the style to quickly become one of the biggest and most famous loyalist bands of the 1970s/80s. In 1977, Millrow F.B. released an LP and also featured on a CD titled Ulster's Greatest Bands Meet, featuring three other flute bands, where Millrow contributed more tunes to the CD than any of the other three bands did on their own.

=== Parades ===
According to the Parades Commission there were nine parades or processions in Tobermore in 2011, twelve in 2012, which included the regional Twelfth celebrations, and eight in 2013. They range from the local flute band Tobermore Loyal, the Tobermore branch of the Walker Club of the Apprentice Boys of Derry, the Royal British Legion, the Royal Black Institution, the Boys' Brigade, and the local Orange Order lodge.

== Masonic order ==
Tobermore has its own Masonic Order lodge with the lodge name of Eureka and lodge number 309. At the time of its founding, Tobermore was commonly referred to as Tubbermore and lodge 309 is still referred to by the Masonic Order as being situated in Tubbermore.

In 1747, a warrant was issued for the creation of a Dublin Masonic Lodge, lodge number 169. On 5 September 1765, this warrant was cancelled, however by 7 March 1811, the 169 lodge had resurfaced in Magherafelt. On 1 December 1825, the 169 lodge was removed from Magherafelt to Tobermore where, by 1838, it had moved onto Moneymore. The 169 lodge since 1895 has been situated in Belfast.

== Politics ==
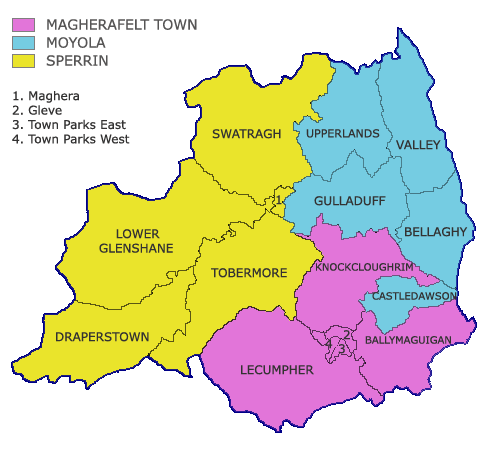
Map depicting boundaries of Magherafelt District Council electoral regions and wards

Tobermore lies within the Tobermore electoral ward of Magherafelt District Council's Sperrin electoral region. Tobermore ward being the only ward in Sperrin with a Protestant majority is regarded as the main base of support for the sole Unionist councillor elected for Sperrin since its inception (except in 1977 when two Unionist councillors were elected). Between 1985 and 2005, the sole Unionist councillor elected for Sperrin was a Tobermore resident; 1985–1989 W. Richardson (Ulster Unionist Party); 1989–2005 R. Montgomery (UUP, Independent).

Tobermore has belonged to the following constituencies:

UK Parliament constituencies

- Londonderry - 1801–85 (abolished and divided into North and South Londonderry)
- South Londonderry - 1885–1922 (abolished and merged with North Londonderry)
- Londonderry - 1922–85

(abolished and divided into Foyle and East Londonderry)

- East Londonderry - 1985–95 (boundary change)
- Mid Ulster - 1995–present

Northern Ireland Parliament constituencies

- Londonderry - 1921–29 (abolished)
- South Londonderry - 1929–73 (abolished)

Northern Ireland Assembly constituencies

- Mid-Ulster - 1998–present

Northern Ireland local government

- Magherafelt Poor Law Union - 1838–98
- Magherafelt Rural Sanitary District - 1878–98
- Magherafelt Rural District (Ireland) - 1898–1921
- Magherafelt Rural District (Northern Ireland) - 1921–73
- Magherafelt District Council - 1973–2015
- Mid-Ulster District Council - 2015-present

== Demography ==
As of the 2021 census, Tobermore had a population of 713 people. At the time of the 2011 census, 5.1% of the population were from a Catholic background and 90.5% were from a Protestant background.

== Notable people ==
- Dr. Adam Clarke (1762–1832) – British Methodist theologian and Biblical scholar born in the townland of Moybeg north of Tobermore village.
- Alexander Carson (1776–1844) – Irish Baptist pastor and author of Baptism, Its Mode and Subjects. In dedication to Alexander Carson, his church in Tobermore, founded in 1814, was named the Carson Memorial, and a housing estate opposite it named Carson Court.
- Harry Gregg MBE (1932–2020) – Former Manchester United and Northern Ireland goalkeeper. Gregg was born in Tobermore though grew up in Coleraine.
- Hiram Parkes Wilkinson, BCL, KC (1866–1935) – Son of Sir Hiram Shaw Wilkinson (see below), who served as Crown Advocate in Shanghai from 1897 to 1925 and as a Judge of the High Court of Weihaiwei from 1916 to 1925. Upon his retirement in 1925, Wilkinson moved to Moneyshanere. He founded the Tobermore Unionist Club, which later became a branch of the Ulster Volunteers. He returned to China in 1932 and died in Shanghai in 1935.
- Sir Hiram Shaw Wilkinson, JP, DL (1840–1926) – British judge and diplomat, who served as Crown Advocate in Shanghai from 1881 to 1897. He was appointed Judge of the British Court for Japan in 1897 and, in 1900, became Chief Justice of the British Supreme Court for China and Corea. After retirement, he moved to the townland of Moneyshanere, outside Tobermore, where he died in 1926.

== Education ==
Before the establishment of national primary schools, education lay mainly in the hands of the church. In Tobermore the Church of Ireland parish of Kilcronaghan has records of its school masters going as far back as Mr. Alex Trotter in 1686. The Parish School was originally built in the townland of Granny on the leading road between Tobermore and Draperstown. Despite being a Church of Ireland Parish School, it was open to children of all denominations. In 1836, there were 70 children recorded on the roll with 28 being described as Church of Ireland, 20 Presbyterian, 2 Roman Catholic, and 20 "other denominations". Secular education such as arithmetic was taught as well as English. The local Presbyterian Church would also found its own school held in the Session House at the rear of the Presbyterian meeting house. Private session classes for adults would also be held twice a week in the Presbyterian Session House.

Tobermore's first public school was established in 1817 in a room that was formerly a public house. It received an income from the London Hibernian Society as well as books published by them such as Thompson and Gough's Arithmetic and Murray's English Grammar. This school is now the present-day Tobermore Primary School. In 1826, Killytoney National School was established. It was built on the old leading road between Tobermore and Desertmartin and has been connected to the National Board since 1833. During this time, there were also another seven schools in Kilcronaghan Parish; four female schools, one of which in the townland of Brackagh Rowley (sic) was an Irish speaking school; an Irish male school; and two national schools. By 1967, Kilcronaghan Parish School had closed and was amalgamated with Black Hill School and Sixtowns School to become the present-day Kilross Primary School.

There are two schools in the Tobermore area, both within the North Eastern Education and Library Board area. These include Tobermore Primary School and Kilross Primary School.

For secondary education, students from the Tobermore electoral ward mainly attend schools in Magherafelt and to a lesser degree Draperstown. Tobermore ward also has the highest education performance of any ward within Magherafelt District Council, with 88.8% of students achieving 5 or more GCSEs at grades of C+ or higher in 2008. This is compared to averages of: 71.8% for Magherafelt District Council; 70.1% for Mid-Ulster parliamentary constituency; and 66.9% for Northern Ireland.

== Sport ==
Tobermore United F.C. is the local association football club. As of 2022, the club were playing in the NIFL Premier Intermediate League. Tobermore United are known as the only club George Best played competitively for in Northern Ireland. The match, in which he played, took place in February 1984.

The Tobermore Golf Driving Range, which opened in 1995, is a two-tier structure containing 34 bays.

== See also ==
- List of towns and villages in Northern Ireland
