= Loughinsholin =

Barony in County Londonderry, Northern Ireland

Loughinsholin Loch Inse Ui Fhloinn (Irish)
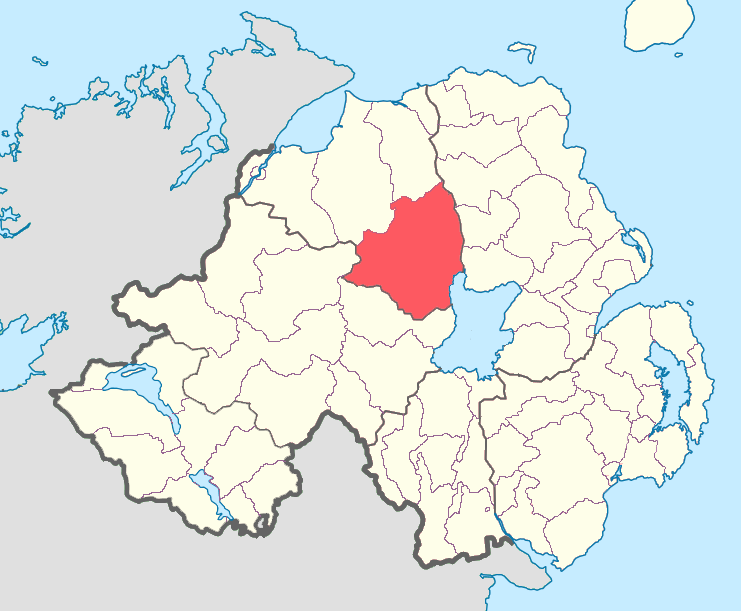
- Location of Loughinsholin, County Londonderry, Northern Ireland.
- Sovereign state: United Kingdom
- Country: Northern Ireland
- County: Londonderry

Loughinsholin (from Irish Loch Inse Ui Fhloinn 'lough of O'Flynn's island') is a barony in County Londonderry, Northern Ireland. Its southeast borders the northwest shore of Lough Neagh, and itself is bordered by seven other baronies: Dungannon Upper to the south; Strabane Upper to the west; Keenaght and Coleraine to the north; Kilconway, Toome Upper, and Toome Lower to the east. It was formed largely on the extent of the northern part of the medieval Irish túath of Uí Tuirtri.

The Sperrin Mountains rise to the west of Loughinsholin, with Slieve Gallion and Carntogher the two most notable mountains of the range in the barony. The Ballinderry River flows along the southern boundary of the barony, with the River Moyola cutting through the middle, both emptying into Lough Neagh. The largest settlement in the barony is the town of Magherafelt.

== History ==
=== Medieval history and Uí Tuirtri ===
The area of land that forms Loughinsholin has changed control several times throughout history. During the first millennium, it was part of the over-kingdom of Ulaid. It would then become part of the over-kingdom of Airgialla, founded by the Three Collas from their conquests in Ulster. One of the under-kingdoms of Airgialla was Uí Tuirtri, named after Fiachu Tort, son of Colla Uais (one of the Three Collas), which stretched from the River Blackwater south of Dungannon to the River Bior (meaning water, modern day Moyola River), located half a mile north of Tobermore.

The Ó Floinn sept (English: O'Lynn) would come to prominence in Uí Tuirtri, with their power-base situated on a crannog just outside the modern village of Desertmartin. The lake this crannog lay in became known as "Lough Insholin" and was preserved as the name of the barony of Loughinsholin upon its creation. Centuries later, Shane More O'Hagan, once owner of Calmore Castle within the parish of Kilcronaghan in the barony, later married a lady from these O'Lynns and took up residence at "Lough Insholin".

With the expansion of the Cenél nEógain into Airgialla, the territory of Uí Tuirtri west of the River Bann eventually passed into the overlordship of Tír Eóghain. By the 1350s, the Clandeboye O'Neills had stepped into the power-vacuum left by the collapse of the Earldom of Ulster, and expanded to encompass all of Uí Tuirtri.

The last recorded lord of Loughinsholin was Brian Carrach O'Neill from a branch of the Clandeboye O'Neills. Brian Carrach's residence along the border of the parishes of Kilcronaghan and Ballynascreen became known as Dún Tí Bhriain (preserved as the townland of Duntibryan). His daughter Anne, was the second wife of last prince of Clandeboye, Shane MacBryan O'Neill of Edenduffcarrick, later known as Shane's Castle, Antrim. Brian Carrach was killed by Hugh O'Neill, Earl of Tyrone in 1586.

On 15 July 1591, County Tyrone was divided into eight baronies, of which one was "Loghynisolin", containing the districts of Cloncankayne (Glenconkeyne) and Kilytraghe (Killetra).

=== Charter of Londonderry ===
The barony of Loughinsholin upon creation was originally part of County Tyrone, and in the survey of 1609, the map for the area shows it divided into two sections; the first of which contains the ancient Irish districts of "Killetragh" (Killetra), "Tomlagh", "Tarraghter", and "Melannagh" (Melanagh). The second of which contained the ancient districts of "Glanconkeyne" (Glenconkeyne) and "Clandonel" (Clandonnell).

In 1613 however as part of the Charter of Londonderry, most of the barony except for the south-western portion consisting of Tarraghter and Melanagh, was incorporated into the new county of Londonderry. The remainder, which remained in County Tyrone, along with the barony of Mountjoy was amalgamated with that of Dungannon.

== Proportions ==
Prior to 1613 and the creation of County Londonderry, the barony of Loughinsholin, like that of Coleraine, Keenaght, and Tirkeeran, was divided up into "proportions" for the survey carried out in 1609. The names and extent of these proportions were recited in the grant of the new county to The Honourable The Irish Society. The estates of three of the great twelve London livery companies had their centres in the barony: the Drapers' Company in present-day Moneymore; the Salters' Company in Magherafelt; and the Vintners' Company in Bellaghy.

In most instances each proportion lay within one of the ancient territories that consisted the barony, in which each proportion consisted of a number of townlands.

=== Killetra ===
- Ballinemanagh - A middle proportion consisting of 1,500 acres, besides glebe land.
- Drumrott - A small proportion consisting of 1,000 acres, besides glebe land.
- Tirnafessy - A small proportion consisting of 1,000 acres, besides glebe land.

=== Clandonnell ===
- Gortconra - A great proportion consisting of 2,000 acres, besides glebe land.
- Ballymacrossy - A small proportion consisting of 1,000 acres.

=== Glenconkeyne ===
- Moysaden - A small proportion consisting of 1,000 acres.
- Cohoire - A small proportion consisting of 1,000 acres, besides glebe land.
- Cynah - A small proportion consisting of 1,000 acres, besides glebe land.

=== Tomlagh ===
- Balleletrim - A great proportion consisting of 2,500 acres, besides glebe land.

=== Other proportions ===
- Corramony - A small proportion split between Clandonnell and Glenconkeyne consisting of 1,000 acres, besides glebe land.
- Lackah - A small proportion split between Killetra and Tomlagh consisting of 1,000 acres.
- Tyrassan - A small proportion consisting of 420 acres.
- Lands in Killetra that in all make up two proportions consisting of 420 and 560 acres respectively.

== List of settlements ==
Below is a list of settlements in Loughinsholin:

=== Towns ===
- Maghera
- Magherafelt

=== Villages ===
- Ballyronan
- Bellaghy
- Castledawson
- Clady
- Curran
- Desertmartin
- Draperstown
- Inishrush
- Kilrea
- Knockloughrim
- Moneymore
- Swatragh
- Tamlaght
- The Loup
- Tobermore
- Upperlands

=== Hamlets and population centres ===
- Ballinderry Bridge
- Ballymaguigan
- Ballyneese
- Churchtown
- Glen
- Herveyhill
- Tamlaght O'Crilly
- The Six Towns

== List of civil parishes ==
Below is a list of civil parishes in Loughinsholin:

- Arboe (split with barony of Dungannon Upper)
- Artrea (split with barony of Dungannon Upper)
- Ballinderry (split with barony of Dungannon Upper)
- Ballynascreen
- Ballyscullion (split with barony of Toome Upper)
- Derryloran (split with barony of Dungannon Upper)
- Desertlyn
- Desertmartin
- Kilcronaghan
- Killelagh
- Kilrea
- Lissan (also partly in barony of Dungannon Upper)
- Maghera
- Magherafelt
- Tamlaght (split with barony of Dungannon Upper)
- Tamlaght O'Crilly (split with barony of Coleraine)
- Termoneeny
