= Mid Ulster (district) =

Local government district in Northern Ireland

Mid Ulster Irish: Lár Uladh
- District
- Mid Ulster shown within Northern Ireland
- Coordinates: 54.668°N 6.679°W
- Sovereign state: United Kingdom
- Country: Northern Ireland
- Incorporated: 1 April 2015
- Named for: Ulster
- Administrative HQ: Dungannon

Government
  - Type: District council
  - Body: Mid Ulster District Council
  - Executive: Committee system
  - Control: No overall control

Area
  - Total: 704 sq mi (1,823 km^{2})
  - Rank: 3rd

Population (2024)
  - Total: 152,718
  - Rank: 5th
  - Density: 220/sq mi (84/km^{2})
- Time zone: UTC+0 (GMT)
  - Summer (DST): UTC+1 (BST)
- Postcode areas: BT
- Dialling codes: 028
- ISO 3166 code: GB-MUL
- GSS code: N09000009
- Website: midulstercouncil.org

Mid Ulster is a local government district in Northern Ireland. The district was created on 1 April 2015 by merging Magherafelt District, Cookstown District, and the Borough of Dungannon and South Tyrone. The local authority is Mid Ulster District Council.

== Geography ==
The district covers parts of counties Londonderry, Tyrone, and Armagh, taking in the entire western shore of Lough Neagh, and bordering County Monaghan in the Republic of Ireland. The district had a population of 152,718 in 2024. The name of the new district was announced on 17 September 2008.

== Mid Ulster District Council ==
Mid Ulster District Council replaced Magherafelt District Council, Cookstown District Council and Dungannon and South Tyrone Borough Council. The first election for the new district council was originally due to take place in May 2009, but on April 25, 2008, Shaun Woodward, Secretary of State for Northern Ireland announced that the scheduled 2009 district council elections were to be postponed until 2011. The first elections took place on 22 May 2014 and the council acted as a shadow authority until 1 April 2015.
