= Smyth baronets =

Set index for Smyth baronets

There have been six baronetcies created for persons with the surname Smyth (as distinct from Smythe and Smith), two in the Baronetage of England, one in the Baronetage of Great Britain, one in the Baronetage of Ireland and two in the Baronetage of the United Kingdom. As of 2026 one creation is extant.

- Smyth baronets of Redcliff (1661)
- Smyth baronets of Upton (1665)
- Smyth baronets of Isfield (1714)
- Smyth baronets of Tinny Park (1776): see Sir Skeffington Smyth, 1st Baronet (1745–1797)
- Smyth baronets of Ashton Court (1859): see Sir John Henry Greville Smyth, 1st Baronet (1836–1901)
- Smyth baronets of Teignmouth (1956)

== See also ==
- Smith baronets
- Smythe baronets
- Bowyer-Smyth baronets
