= Thomas Ashurst =

- Born: c.1465
- Died: unknown
- Occupation: Bristol merchant
- Years active: 1488-c.1520
- Organization: Company Adventurers to the New Found Land
- Known for: Exploration voyages to North America

Thomas Ashurst (fl. 1488 – c. 1520) was a fifteenth-century Bristol merchant who was involved in the port's early Atlantic exploration voyages to North America. He was one of a group of Bristol and Portuguese merchants who received Letters Patent from Henry VII in 1501 and 1502, to conduct exploration, discovery and settlement on behalf of the king.

== Life ==
Little is known of Ashurst's early life or career. He was, however, actively engaged in Bristol's trade by 1488, importing wine and other goods from Lisbon and Andalusia. Since a merchant would not normally be recorded in the customs accounts until they had completed their apprenticeship and set up business on their own account, it seems likely that Ashurst was born in the mid-1460s.

The most detailed information relating to Ashurst concerns a 1503 dispute over an debt he had allegedly incurred in Portugal and had not paid prior to his return to England. The pursuit of him by an Alfonso Piers of Portugal led to the direct involvement of the King of England.

Ashurst continued to be involved in Bristol's ordinary trade, exporting goods to Ireland in 1504. He, or a merchant of the same name, is mentioned in documents of 1512, 1516-17 and 1525-6, engaging in Bristol's overseas trade. It is possible, however, that some of the later references might be referring to a son, given that many Bristol merchants gave their first-born son their own Christian name. Ashurst's associate, Robert Thorne the elder and his merchant son, Robert Thorne the younger, are a well-known example.

Ashurst left no will and his date and place of death is not known.

== Atlantic Exploration ==
On 19 March 1501, Thomas 'Asshehurst' was one a group of Bristol and Portuguese merchants who received Letters Patent for western discovery. This group included the Bristol merchants, Robert Thorne and Hugh Eliot. On 9 December 1502, Henry VII issued a new and revised patent for exploration. The new patent excluded some of the merchants from the earlier patent but again names Thomas 'Asshehurste'. His inclusion suggests that, unlike some of the earlier patentees, Ashurst had contributed to the group's 1502 voyage and remained involved thereafter. He may have been one of ‘the merchauntes of bristoll that have bene in the new founde launde’, who were rewarded by Henry VII in September 1502. It seems likely that Ashurst was also the 'one that brought haukes from the Newfounded Island’ to the king on 24 November 1503.

By 1504 the exploration patent holders had become known as the Company Adventurers to the New Found Land. They undertook at least one further voyage that year, on which John Cabot's son, Sebastian Cabot, was employed as a navigator. Relationships among the patentees subsequently broke down. By 1506 Hugh Eliot and another merchant, William Clarke of London, were suing each other over alleged debts relating to the expeditions, while a Portuguese member of the group, Francisco Fernandes, was appealing to the king over his imprisonment for a debt of £100 Eliot claimed he owed him. The extent to which Ashurst was involved in this litigation is unclear. Whether Ashurst was involved in Sebastian Cabot's 1508-09 expedition to North America, which was the last conducted from Bristol in this era, is also unknown.
