= Thomas Howell (merchant) =

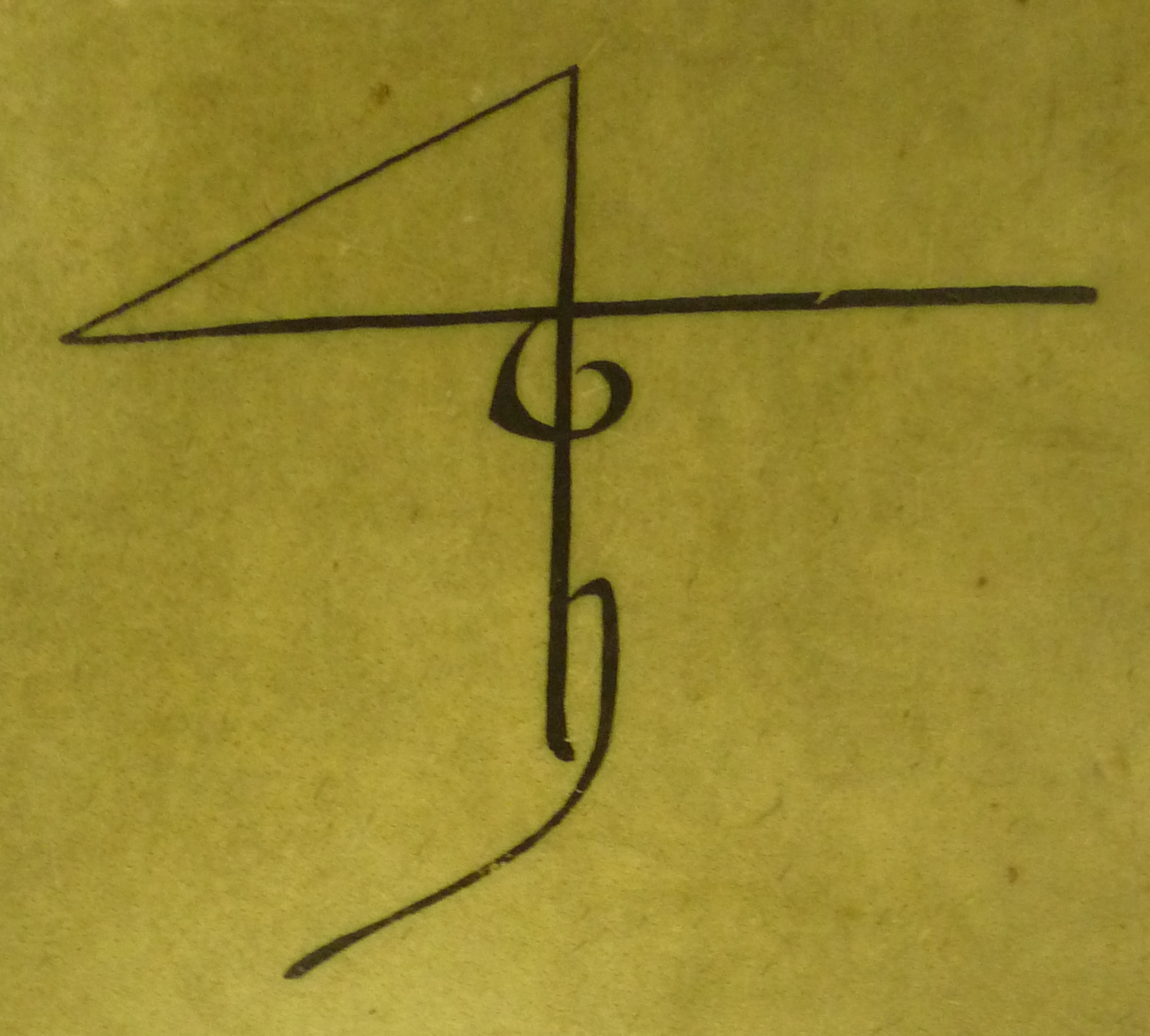
- Howell's merchant mark, inscribed by him on the front cover of his ledger, c.1517
- Born: c. 1480; Bristol, England
- Died: 1537 (aged 56–57); Seville, Crown of Castile
- Occupations: Merchant, Draper
- Known for: Charitable bequests and being the first English merchant to employ double-entry bookkeeping
- Spouse: Joanna Christian (m. 1513; died 1529)
- Parents: John Howell / Aphowell (father); Alice (mother)

Thomas Howell (c. 1480–1537) was a British merchant and philanthropist of Welsh origin, who trained in Bristol and London. His surviving commercial ledger (1517–27) is the first example of double-entry bookkeeping in English. He is best known for the large charitable bequests he left on his death, which included the monies used to found Howell's School in Llandaff, Cardiff and Howell's School in Denbigh.

== Early life and education ==
The most detailed account of Howell's life can be found in Heather Dalton's biographical study. He was born in Bristol c.1480 to John Howell, a local merchant, and his wife, Alice. His father may be the John Howell who was trading through the port in 1504 to Andalusia, Bordeaux and south Wales. Following John's death, Alice married Sir Thomas Ap Morgan of Pencoed Castle in Monmouthshire with whom she had further children. Thomas maintained a connection with his family in Wales, leaving £100 in his 1522 will to James Ap Morgan 'my brother', who lived in Usk.

In the later 1490s Howell was apprenticed to the Bristol merchant, Hugh Eliot, who was one of the principle merchants involved with Bristol's Atlantic exploration voyages. Howell was first sent to Spain c.1502, buying and selling goods for Eliot. However, Howell later transferred his apprenticeship to the London draper (cloth merchant), William Roche. Howell became a freeman of the Drapers' Company in 1506/7.

== Career ==
Map of Howell's trading reach, taken from Dalton (ed.), Ledger of Thomas Howell, p. xix

Howell was a merchant, based in London, from 1507. Around 1513 he married Joanna Christian, the widow of a wealthy draper, greatly increasing Howell's capital. He made regular trips to both Bristol and Spain, maintaining a house in Seville, in addition to his London property. In 1517 Howell joined the livery of the Drapers' Company.

Howell was primarily a cloth merchant, dealing in woollen broadcloth, which was the mainstay of England's export trade. He bought finished and unfinished broadcloth from the west country, Suffolk and Essex, which he often had dyed and finished in London before exporting it. From the sale of this cloth in Spain, Howell purchased wine, iron, woad dye, alum, olive oil and soap for sale in England.

From 1522–26, Howell lived in Seville, arriving back in England on 10 September 1526. On his return he was appointed junior warden of the Drapers' Company in 1527.

In 1528, Howell travelled to Seville to resume his business there. His wife, Joanne, died in London in 1529 and Howell decided to stay in Seville, where he had substantial business interests. From Andalusia he was able to trade with London but also into the Mediterranean, to the Canaries and to Santo Domingo in Hispaniola. By the 1530s Howell was very rich. The 1534 Lay Subsidy tax roll assessed him as the sixth richest tax payer in London and the wealthiest Draper, with a total capitalised wealth of £3,107. At this time an English labourer earned about £5 per year. The Subsidy Roll, moreover, 'undoubtedly...understated real wealth' since it was based on individuals' own assessment of their taxable wealth.

By 1536/7 Howell had become ill. He began to make preparations for his death, including the repatriation of his Spanish assets to England to pay for his bequests. Howell calculated his Spanish assets at 12,000 ducats (£2,700). Since he had no children and his wife had died, he decided to leave the bulk of his estate to charitable causes in England and Wales. He died in 1537 and was buried in El Convento de San Pablo el Real, a Dominican monastery in central Seville.

The repatriation of Howell's Spanish assets proved a complicated and protracted process, in great part because of the commencement of the Reformation in England, following Henry VIII's break with Rome. Henry's claim to be head of the Church of England was not recognised by Spain, leading to his excommunication by the Pope in 1534. Howell himself had, however, remained a committed Catholic leaving substantial bequests to religious institutions in Spain, including 30,000 Requiem Masses to be said for his soul in Seville. Howell's religious orthodoxy may have facilitated matters and by the end of 1541 8,720 ducats had been transferred to the Drapers Company.

== Commercial ledger ==
Howell's surviving ledger or 'Great Book', covers the years from 1517–27 when he was based primarily in London. It was left with the Drapers in 1528 for safe keeping and was kept by them after his death since it included a record of his outstanding debts that the Drapers could seek to recover to help fund Howell's bequests.

The transcription of the ledger began in the 1950s by John Brierley (Birkbeck, University of London) but was not published by the time of his death in 2008. In 2024 Brierley's transcription was published by Bristol Record Society in a volume edited by Heather Dalton (University of Melbourne). It is notable, in particular, for being the earliest example of double-entry bookkeeping in England, as well as the first to contain records of an English merchant trading to the New World.

== Bequests ==
Howell left most of his estate to charitable causes. This included 1000 ducats left to the merchant Nicholas Thorne of Bristol to further the charitable works his brother, Robert Thorne the younger, had pursued there. The 12,000 ducats Howell bequeathed to the Drapers was intended to provide marriage portions (dowries) for Welsh maidens of Howell's lineage, with the surname 'Howell'. The bequest enabled the Drapers to purchase their current Hall, the former house of Thomas Cromwell at Austin Friars. Finding Welsh maidens of Howell's lineage proved difficult and complicated, leading to frequent litigation. In 1853 the Drapers decreed that the trust be used to establish two girl's schools in Wales, to be named after the founder: Howell's School in Llandaff, Cardiff and Howell's School in Denbigh. Since the closure of the Denbigh school in 2013 the money from the Thomas Howell's Trust has been used to support the Llandaff school, as well as providing grants to organisations and institutions in Wales supporting education for those under 25 'particularly in areas of high deprivation.' As of 2023, the Trust's income and expenditure amounted to c.£631,000 per year.
