= Killynumber =

- townland

Irish transcription(s)
  - Derivation: Cúil an Umair
  - Meaning: "Recess of the trough or hollow"
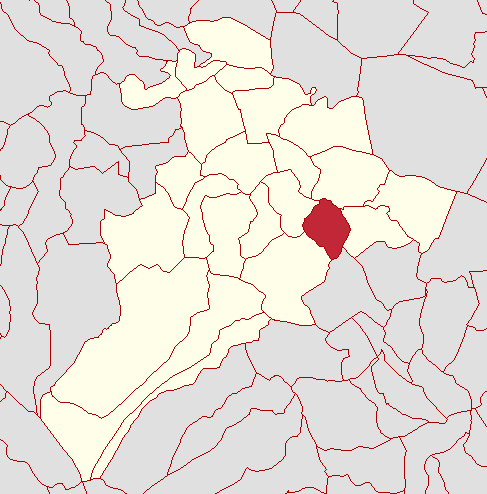

- Killynumber shown within Northern Ireland Killynumber (the United Kingdom)
- Coordinates: 54°47′31″N 6°41′10″W
- Sovereign state: United Kingdom
- Country: Northern Ireland
- County: County Londonderry
- Barony: Loughinsholin
- Civil parish: Kilcronaghan
- Plantation grant: Drapers Company and freeholds
- First recorded: 1609

Government
  - Council: Mid Ulster District
  - Ward: Tobermore

Area
  - Total: 177.0 acres (71.64 ha)
- Irish grid ref: H8494

Killynumber (locally [ˌkʲïliˈnӧmər], from Irish Cúil an Umair 'recess of the trough or hollow') is a townland lying within the civil parish of Kilcronaghan, County Londonderry, Northern Ireland. It lies in the south-east with the civil parish of Desertmartin, and it is bounded by the townlands of Annagh & Moneysterlin, Coolsaragh, Drumsamney, Gortamney, and Killytoney. It was apportioned to the Drapers company as well as freeholds.

The townland was part of Tobermore electoral ward of the former Magherafelt District Council, however in 1901 and 1926 it was part of Iniscarn district electoral division as part of the Draperstown dispensary (registrar's) district of Magherafelt Rural District. It was also part of the historic barony of Loughinsholin.

== Etymology ==
The townland of Killynumber is postulated as being derived from Cúil an Umair meaning "recess of the trough or hollow", with a noticeable hollow lying within the townland.

== History ==
Population
Year	Pop.
1841	121
1851	100
1861	80
1871	64
1881	65
1891	64
1901	38 ^{[a]}
1911	44
1926	35
^[a] - decrease is attributed to emigration and removals

Size (acres, roods, poles)
Year	a, r, p
1851	180, 0, 33
1881	180, 0, 33
1901	180, 0, 33
1926	180, 1, 32

Earlier recorded forms
Year	Form
1609	Coulanamour (O.S.)
1613	Cowlanamone (Charter)
1622	Colnumer
1654	Cullnumber
1657	Coulananonie
1659c	Cooleminiber
1661	Cullminiber
1663	Cullnamer
1767	Killinumber
1813	Killynumer (S.M.)
(O.S.) - Ordnance Survey map (1609) (Charter) - Charter of Londonderry (1613) (S.M.) - Sampson's Map

== See also ==
- Kilcronaghan
- List of townlands in Tobermore
- Tobermore
