= Howell's School, Denbigh =

Former school in Denbighshire, Wales

Howell's School

Location
- Denbigh, Denbighshire; Wales; 53.184217°N 3.41531°W

Information
- Type: Private, day and boarding
- Motto: Deo Soli Sit Honor Et Gloria (Unto God Only Be Honour and Glory)
- Established: 1859
- Closed: 2013
- Gender: Girls
- Age: 3 to 18
- Colour: Maroon

Howell's School Denbigh (Welsh: Ysgol Howell Dinbych) was a private girls-only school located in Denbigh, Denbighshire. A new co-educational independent school, Myddelton College, opened on the site in 2016.

The school taught girls from the age of 3 up to 18 and contained a pre-preparatory, preparatory, senior and sixth form. It was established in 1859 with funding from Thomas Howell's trustees who later established Howell's School Llandaff in 1860. The school had many facilities including a sports hall, 120 acres of grounds and an equestrian centre. In the 2011 Daily Telegraph Independent League Table of GCSE results, Howell's School came 298th in the UK with 22.03% A* Grade and 45.79% A* or A grade.

Following some years of decline in numbers and a series of tribunals involving staff wrongfully dismissed amid allegations of poor management, the school announced on 2 August 2013 that it would not be reopening for the following academic year, citing financial difficulties as the primary reason, although this is disputed. The school went into liquidation on 22 August 2013 following a meeting with creditors.

== History ==
Thomas Howell was a Bristol-born merchant of Welsh origins, who became a Draper of the city of London and made his fortune trading with Spain and Portugal from 1507 to 1537. When he died in 1537, he bestowed in his will 12,000 golden ducats (about £2,200,000 today) to the Drapers' Company, the proceeds of which were to be given every year forever to four maiden orphans of his lineage. If such could not be found, then to other maiden orphans at the discretion of the Master and Wardens.

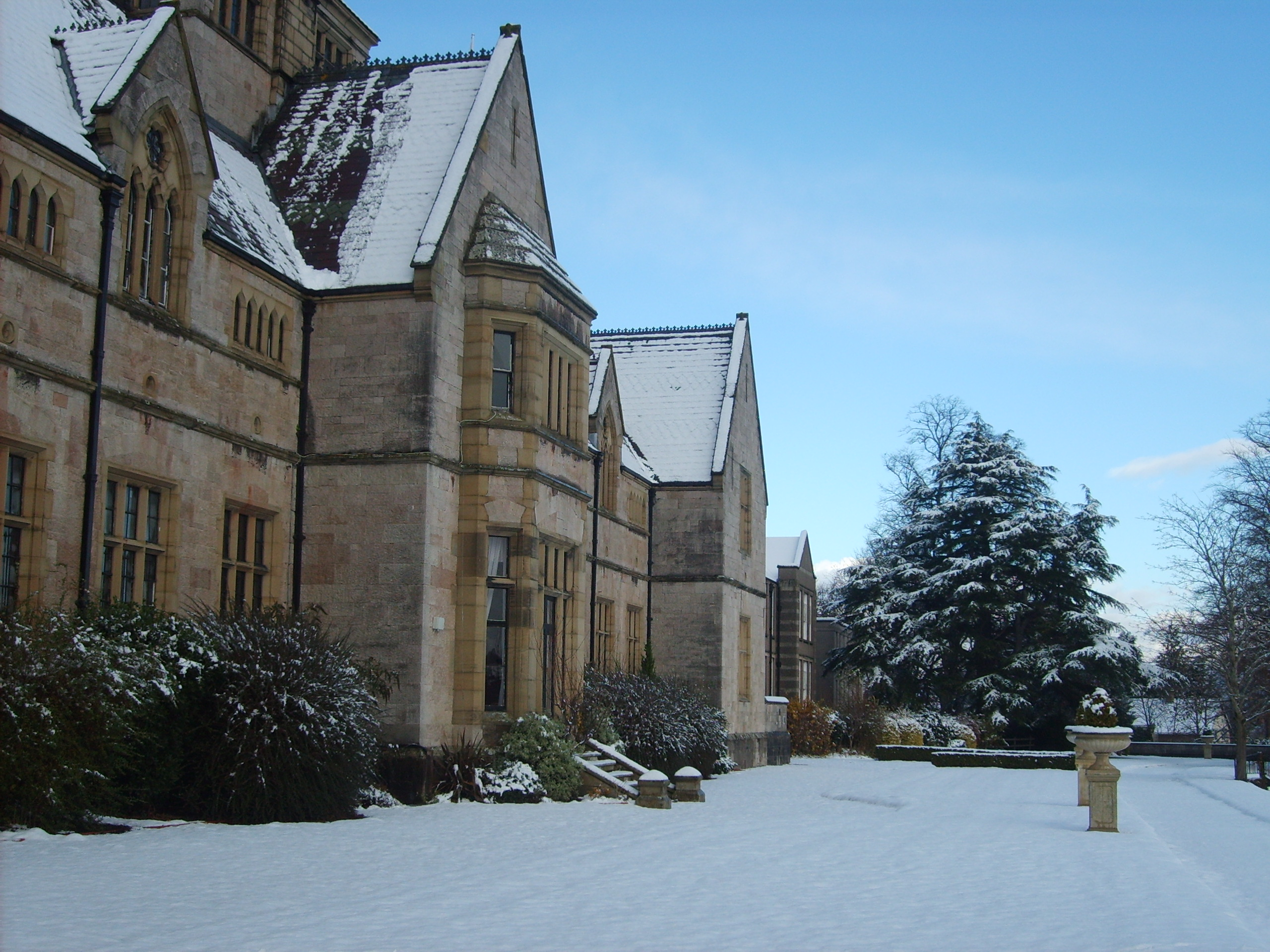
Howell's rear in the snow

The Drapers' Company had great difficulty in obtaining this money from Spain. Eventually, in 1541, £570 was received in cash as well as a consignment of wine and oil, which was sold to young men of the company. There still remained a large sum of money to be recovered and the services of the Bishop of London were enlisted. The money was invested in freehold property in the City of London. The difficulty of administering the trust began at once, because it was usually hard to find orphan maidens of Howell's kin. In 1853, more than 300 years after the death of Howell, an Act of Parliament was passed, empowering the Court of Chancery to extend the trust to the establishment of girls' schools in Wales. Two girls' schools in Llandaff and Denbigh were built in 1858, and were both carried on by the Drapers' Company. The school was originally built for 55 boarders and 50 day girls. A system of houses was afterwards begun, in addition to the original block of buildings. There were three: Haulfryn, Bodgwilym and Minffordd. In 1914, a wing was built containing additional classrooms, music rooms, gymnasium and an assembly hall which has now become the library. In 1931, another milestone was reached with the opening of extensive new buildings, the Great Hall, the dining hall and kitchens, and three new houses: St George's, St Andrew's and St Patrick's. From time to time, many other improvements were made, such as a sports pavilion, swimming bath and tennis courts.

== Facilities ==
The school had extensive grounds backing onto the Denbighshire countryside including a sports hall with climbing and abseiling facilities, caving, orienteering and an outdoor swimming pool. It also had its own equestrian centre with several arenas, jumping and livery facilities.

== Controversies ==
The school was run by H2000, directors Robbie and Nicola Locke, who give their main residence as the Cayman Islands.

In June 2012, Rebecca Raven, an art teacher, won an unfair dismissal case against the school after an application for maternity leave. The school claimed that she had been employed to cover a teacher with long term sickness who had since decided not to return. A subsequent audit had shown only a part-time post was required, which Raven declined. They had been unaware that she was pregnant. However, the tribunal believed the real cause was the "extremely precarious" state of the school finances and that the school did not want to "waste money on maternity pay". Dr Philip Dixon, of ATL Cymru, stated, "This is an appalling example to give to pupils who are, hopefully, being educated to be young, independent women with fulfilling careers and lives. We are delighted to have won this case for Mrs Raven. It is a victory for natural justice and common sense."

The school was considering an appeal. Raven was awarded over £33,000 in compensation from the case but by August 2013 had not received any money.

In March 2013, the sacked headmaster, Bernie Routledge, and teacher, Helen Price, won their cases for unfair dismissal. The tribunal chairman found that there was no evidence that either had deserved their sackings. He described the disciplinary procedure undergone by Routledge (which was carried out by the brother of Robbie Locke, a school trustee) as "cack-handed" and "chaotic", saying the panel felt the dismissals were as a result of issues raised by Routledge regarding the conduct of a member of staff who was a good friend of Robbie and Nicola Locke (both trustees of the school) who allegedly pressured staff to fill in inspection questionnaires dishonestly. Routledge also aired concerns about irregularities in pension payments. The head teacher told the tribunal that, during a break, Nicola Locke had called him a paedophile. The tribunal ruled that both teachers were entitled to "substantial" damages. On 12 September Routledge was awarded £217,000 and Price £84,000.

Another member of staff, senior mistress Morwen Murray, was awarded damages in September 2013 for unlawful deduction of earnings after she took sick leave. She was sacked the day before the school announced its closure and was pursuing a further claim.

The NASUWT had pursued nearly ten claims against the school by September 2013 and had won every one.

The school announced that it would be closing on 2 August 2013. An independent auditor's report in August 2012 had outlined concerns which cast doubt on the ability of the school to remain a going concern. On 22 August, the school went into liquidation, calling into question the payment of awards still owing to staff (Rebecca Raven, Bernie Routledge and Helen Price among others) and other creditors. The NASUWT alleged that the bankruptcy was brought about because the school had been operating rent-free until the Lockes insisted on charging rent, changing the balance sheet substantially.

== Notable former pupils ==
- Joan Carlyle, international operatic soprano
- Sheila Allen, actress
- Joanna Scanlan, actress and writer
- Lisa Scott-Lee, singer and songwriter
- Nerys Hughes, actress
- Kirsty Bertarelli, singer, songwriter and model
- Mary Wynne Warner, mathematician
- Laura Deas, Olympic athlete
