= Drumsamney =

- townland

Irish transcription(s)
  - Derivation: Droim Samhna
  - Meaning: "Ridge of Samhain"
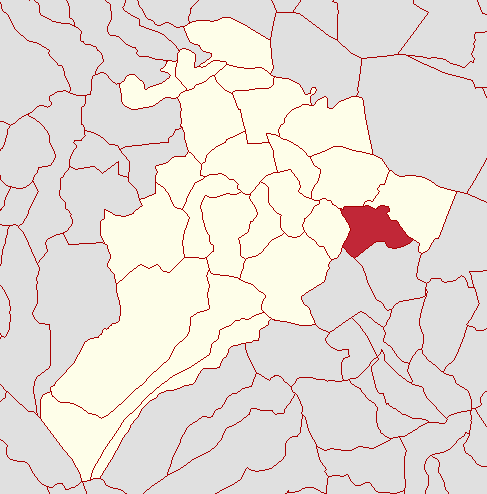

- Drumsamney shown within Northern Ireland Drumsamney (the United Kingdom)
- Coordinates: 54°47′30″N 6°40′22″W
- Sovereign state: United Kingdom
- Country: Northern Ireland
- County: County Londonderry
- Barony: Loughinsholin
- Civil parish: Kilcronaghan
- Plantation grant: To Drapers Company as glebe
- First recorded: 1609

Government
  - Council: Mid Ulster District
  - Ward: Tobermore

Area
  - Total: 229.5 acres (92.89 ha)
- Irish grid ref: H854946

Drumsamney (locally [ˌdrӧmˈsamni], from Irish Droim Samhna 'ridge of Samhain') is a townland lying within the civil parish of Kilcronaghan, County Londonderry, Northern Ireland. It lies in the south-east of the parish on the boundary of the civil parish of Desertmartin, and is bounded by the townlands of; Annagh & Moneysterlin, Ballinderry, Killynumber, Dromore, and Gortamney. In the Plantation of Ulster it was given as a glebe to the Drapers Company.

The townland was part of Tobermore electoral ward of the former Magherafelt District Council, however in 1926 it was part of Tobermore district electoral division as part of the Maghera division of Magherafelt Rural District. It was also part of the historic barony of Loughinsholin.

== Etymology ==
Drumsamney derives its name from the Irish Droim Samhna, meaning "ridge of Samhain". This ridge likely refers to Drumsamney Hill, with the second element of the name relating to the pagan festival of Samhain. The townlands of Drumsawna Beg and Drumsawna More in County Fermanagh also derive from the same origin as Drumsamney.

== History ==
Population
Year	Pop.
1841	138
1851	131
1861	100
1871	81
1881	88
1891	69
1901	28 ^{[a]}
1911	47
1926	39
^[a] - decrease is attributed to emigration and removals

Size (acres, roods, poles)
Year	a, r, p
1851	233, 3, 4
1881	235, 1, 30
1901	235, 1, 30
1926	234, 2, 10

Earlier recorded forms
Year	Form
1609	Dromsauna (E.C.)
1613	Dromsanua (Charter)
1622	Drumsawne
1654	Drumsany
1672c	Dromsana
1813	Drumsamney (S.M.)
_{(E.C.) - Escheated Counties Map 1609 (Charter) - Charter of Londonderry 1613 (S.M.) - Sampson's Map}

== See also ==
- Kilcronaghan
- List of townlands in Tobermore
- Tobermore
