= John Smyth (merchant) =

British merchant (1500-1556)

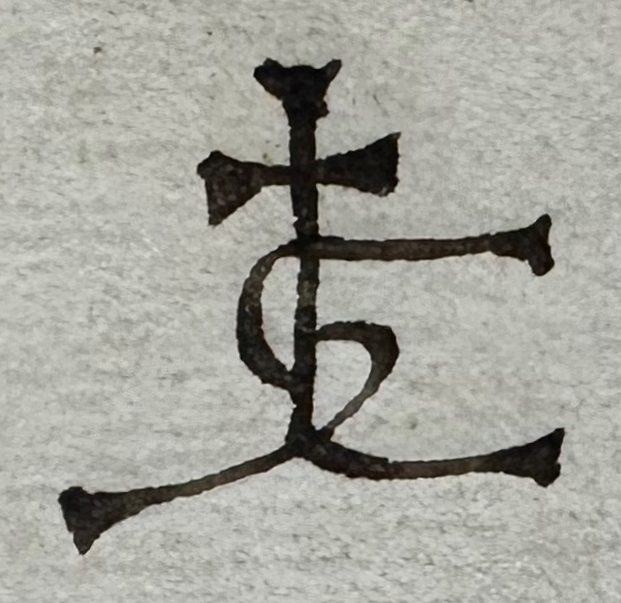
- Smyth's merchant mark made up of his initials: a reversed 'J' and 'S'
- Born: c. 1500; Bristol
- Died: 1 September 1556
- Burial place: St Werburgh's church, Bristol
- Occupation: merchant
- Known for: merchant, mayor of Bristol, founding a gentry family
- Children: Nine children, including Hugh and Matthew
- Parents: Matthew (father); Alice (mother)
- Family: Smyths of Ashton Court

John Smyth ( c. 1500 – 1556), was a sixteenth-century Bristol merchant and mayor of the city. He is best known for founding the Smyth Family (pronounced 'Smith') of Ashton Court estate in Somerset. His gentry descendants resided there until 1946.

== Background and early life ==
Smyth was born around 1500 to Matthew Smyth, a minor Bristol merchant and hooper (cooper or barrel maker), who was originally from the Forest of Dean. Not long after his arrival in Bristol in the 1490s, Matthew Smyth married Alice, the daughter and heiress to a Bristol merchant, Lewis John. The marriage gave Matthew Smyth the capital to establish himself as a merchant. Following Matthew's death in 1526, Alice (d.1546) continued to run her own business, making cloth and importing and exporting goods in her own right. Her son, John, even had a business account for Alice in his ledger.

John Smyth was almost certainly apprenticed to a Bristol or Bridgwater merchant engaged in the Spanish trade. Historians have found it difficult to trace his early life with certainty because of the common nature of his name. However, Jean Vanes, the editor of his ledger, suggests that he may have been apprenticed to either Thomas Hoper or Simon White of Bridgwater. Smyth married Simon White's widow, Joan, in 1529. Since White had been one of the wealthiest merchants in Bridgwater, Joan is likely to have brought significant capital to the marriage.

== Career ==
From 1525, John Smyth began to appear regularly in the Bristol customs accounts, importing goods such as wine and iron from the continent, sometimes alongside his father. Smyth's surviving commercial ledger for the years 1538-50 provides detailed evidence of his business operations and is considered one of the best primary sources on the activities Tudor merchants. The published Bristol customs accounts for 1541/2,1542/3 and 1545/6 suggest that Smyth was one of city's wealthiest merchants by the early 1540s, controlling about 5 percent of the city's overseas trade.

Smyth's legally declared export trade consisted mostly of English woollen cloth and lead, which was dispatched to Bordeaux, San Sebastian in the Basque Country, Lisbon and Andalusia. His main imports were wine, iron, olive oil, soap, woad dye and dried fruit. In addition, Smyth was engaged an extensive illicit trade, smuggling foodstuffs (esp. grain) and leather to Spain. This accounted for about half his of his export trade by value and was by far the most profitable element of his overseas trade. Much of this illegal traffic was conducted on his own ship, the Trinity of Bristol, which was one of the largest ships in city's merchant fleet. In 1546 Smyth sold his ship to the crown, to serve in the royal navy.

After 1530, Smyth played an increasing role in Bristol politics. He was probably on the Common Council by 1530. Smyth served as one of the two sheriffs of Bristol in 1532-3 and was twice appointed mayor of the city (1547-8 and 1554-5). During his term as Sheriff in 1532 Smyth was involved with 'the battle of the pulpits' between Bristol's orthodox preachers and leading protestant, Hugh Latimer. In 1547 Smyth was mayor at the time of the Dissolution of the Chantries, helping to buy up land and properties in Bristol for the Corporation.

== Family and lands ==
During the 1540s, Smyth was able to purchase a number of properties that had been seized by Henry VIII following the Dissolution of the Monasteries. The properties included the Long Ashton estate in Somerset (2 miles west of Bristol), which was centred on the manor house of Ashton Court. Smyth purchased the property in 1545 for £920. He followed this in 1546 by buying the Ashton Meriets manor, adjoining Long Ashton, as well as other properties in the village and the advowson of the parish church. That gave his family the right to appoint the parish priest.

On 8 May 1544, Smyth acquired a Grant of Arms, being styled ‘John Smythe of Bristowe, gent. of the Lordship of Long Aisheton’. The arms figured griffons. While Smyth continued to live in his house on Small Street, in the centre of Bristol, the Ashton Court estate would be the home of his gentry descendants for the next four hundred years.

In the 1545 Lay Subsidy rolls, Smyth, along with the merchant Nicholas Thorne, were assessed as the wealthiest citizens of the city. In the 1550 and 1552 rolls Smyth was assessed as the wealthiest person in the city.

Smyth had seven sons and two daughters by his wife, Joan. Most died young, with only four of the children, Hugh (b. 1530), Matthew (b. 1533), Nicholas and Ann being named in later documents. Hugh and Nicholas were studying at Oxford University in 1547 and at the Inner Temple and Middle Temple in London by 1550. Both were accused of assaults in 1552 and 1553 and Hugh was thrown out of his chamber. John Smyth brought Hugh back to Bristol, where he then married Maud Byccombe of Crowcombe, Somerset in 1553.

== Death and legacy ==
John Smyth died 1 September 1556 and was buried in St Werburgh's church, Bristol. His wife, Joan, was interred with him following her death in 1560. They had a large Gothic tomb in the north aisle of the church, featuring brass plates, a latin verse and Smyth's arms. The monument was destroyed in the eighteenth century when the church was partially rebuilt.

Smyth's son, Hugh, inherited the Long Ashton estate. He seems to have lived a wild life and was accused on multiple occasions of riotous behaviour, assault and poaching, despite being himself a Justice of the Peace. Since Hugh had no male heirs, after his death in 1580 the Ashton Court estate passed to his brother, Matthew. When Matthew died in 1583, the estate passed to Matthew's eight-year-old son, Hugh (b.1575). Matthew's widow, Jane, managed the estate very successfully until Hugh came of age, augmenting the estate through the purchase of additional properties. Hugh was knighted in 1603 by King James I with a baronetcy.

The later Smyth Family included some notable figures, including the cavalier Thomas Smyth (1609-1642), Sir Hugh Smyth (1632-1680), Sir John Smyth (1776–1849) and the naturalist Sir John Henry Greville Smyth (1836-1901). The family continued to live off their Somerset estates, including the coal mined from beneath them. The family's motto was 'Qui capit capitur' (The biter's bit).

Various of the early records of the Smyth family were acquired by Bristol Archives in 1947, following the death of the last of the Smyth family in 1946. More records were accessioned after Bristol Corporation bought Ashton Court estate in 1959, with further purchases in the 1970s. Some of the records have been published, including John Smyth's ledger, and the letters and papers of his Tudor and early Stuart descendants.
