= Howell's School, Llandaff =

Independent day school in Cardiff, Wales

Howell's School Welsh: Ysgol Howell
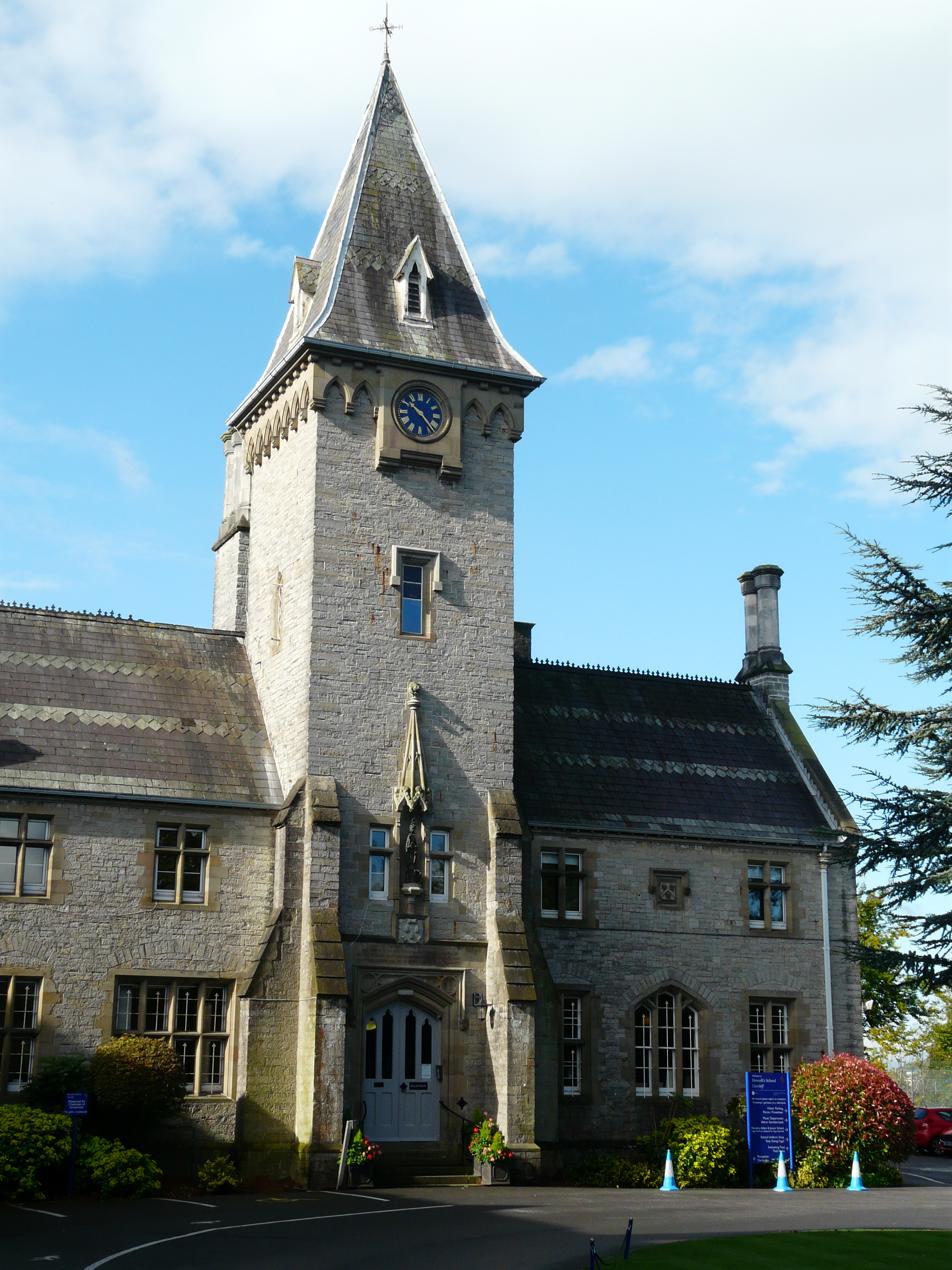

Location
- Llandaff; Cardiff, CF5 2YD; Wales; 51°29′24″N 3°12′43″W

Information
- Type: Private day school
- Motto: Nurturing Excellence
- Established: 1860
- Founder: Thomas Howell
- Local authority: Cardiff Council
- Department for Education URN: 402018 Tables
- Chair of governors: Janey Howell
- Head: Mrs Laura Beynon
- Gender: Girls; Coeducational Sixth Form
- Age: 3 to 18
- Houses: Lewis, Kendall, Baldwin, Trotter
- Alumnae: Hywelians
- Website: http://www.howells-school-llandaff.gdst.net

Howell's School (Welsh: Ysgol Howell) is a private day school for girls in Llandaff, a district in northern Cardiff, Wales. It consists of a nursery, infants, junior, senior school and a sixth form. The sixth form became coeducational in September 2005 and was renamed Howell's Co-ed College.

== History ==
In 1537, Thomas Howell, a Welsh merchant trading in Bristol, London and Seville, bequeathed 12,000 gold ducats to the Drapers' Company to provide dowries "every yere for Maydens for ever." His "Merchant's Mark" is still used as a logo for the school. The school's magazine is called the Golden Ducat in reference to the bequest.

After founding a girls' school of the same name in the town of Denbigh, the Company started building the Llandaff school in 1859 and opened to girls the following year. In 1899 it was expanded to accommodate boarders but the boarding programme has been discontinued. The school still retains its links as the Company has a representative in the school board. It was originally housed in a building designed by Decimus Burton, on the outskirts of the village of Llandaff. The school admitted its first pupils, with Emily Baldwin as the first Headmistress. Today it occupies a large site north of Cardiff city centre.

In 1980 the school joined the Girls' Day School Trust and is under its governance. It is the only member school in Wales.

Novelist Roald Dahl spent part of his childhood at Cumberland Lodge, which was later acquired by the school.

In 2005, the school opened the GDST's first co-educational sixth form with the admission of 26 boys into year 12.

=== Key dates ===
- 1859–60 Howell's School built.
- 1860 Emily Baldwin appointed Headmistress.
- 1860 Classes started with 60 pupils.
- 1872 Miss Ewing appointed Headmistress.
- 1880 Miss Kendall appointed Headmistress.
- 1887 Sanatorium built.
- 1896 Cookery School built.
- 1900 Great Hall built.
- 1906 Steward's Wing built.
- 1906 Hywelian Guild established.
- 1920 Miss Kendall retired.
- 1920 Miss Trotter appointed as Headmistress.
- 1937 Swimming pool built.
- 1937 Miss Knight appointed as Headmistress.
- 1941 Miss Lewis appointed as Headmistress.
- 1950 Science laboratories built.
- 1960 Bryntaf and Oaklands acquired as extra boarding houses.
- 1960 Hywelians donated grand piano.
- 1978 Miss Turner appointed as Headmistress.
- 1980 Howell's School joined the Girls' Day School Trust.
- 1984 Junior School for ages 7–11 opened.
- 1990 Music Block and Octagon Room built.
- 1991 Mrs Jane Fitz appointed as Headmistress.
- 1993 Boarding ceased and houses remodelled for the Sixth Form.
- 1997 Nursery opened accepting girls from the age of three.
- 1997 Sports Hall and Fitness Suite built.
- 2001 New laboratory and renovation programme completed.
- 2003 New Junior School building and extension project commenced.
- 2004 Tŷ Hapus (Happy House), new building for Junior School completed and Junior School intake doubled.
- 2005 Co-educational Sixth Form College established – first young men in school in 145 years.
- 2007 Mrs Sally Davis appointed as Principal.
- 2008 Howell's becomes a Fairtrade School.
- 2010 Howell's celebrates 150 years since its opening.
- 2025 Mrs Laura Beynon appointed Head.

== Academics ==
Howell's is one of Wales's top performing independent schools. In 2011 it made the top 100 schools in the United Kingdom based on GCSE results and ranked first in Wales.

== Notable alumnae ==
Alumnae are known as Hywelians and are entitled membership of the Hywelian Guild. It was founded in 1906 by old girls and is also open to former staff members and teachers.

- Fiona Bruce, Conservative MP
- Patricia Clarke, biochemist
- Ann Cotton, educational entrepreneur and philanthropist
- Janet Davies, Welsh politician
- Dorothy Edwards, novelist and short story writer
- Jem, pop singer
- Jean McFarlane, Baroness McFarlane of Llandaff, the holder of the first Chair of Nursing in an English university, at the University of Manchester
- Julie Morgan, Labour MP
- Lucy Owen (née Cohen), BBC Wales news presenter
- Jo Walton, fantasy and science fiction writer
- Hannah Mills, Olympic Gold Medallist, MBE
- Charlotte Church, singer and actress
- Marmalade, RuPaul's Drag Race UK
- Joan Baker, painter and teacher at Cardiff School of Art & Design; first woman to run a major art department in Wales
- Claire

== Gallery ==
A group of students

The College musical Oh, What a Lovely War!
