= Emily Baldwin (headmistress) =

English headmistress

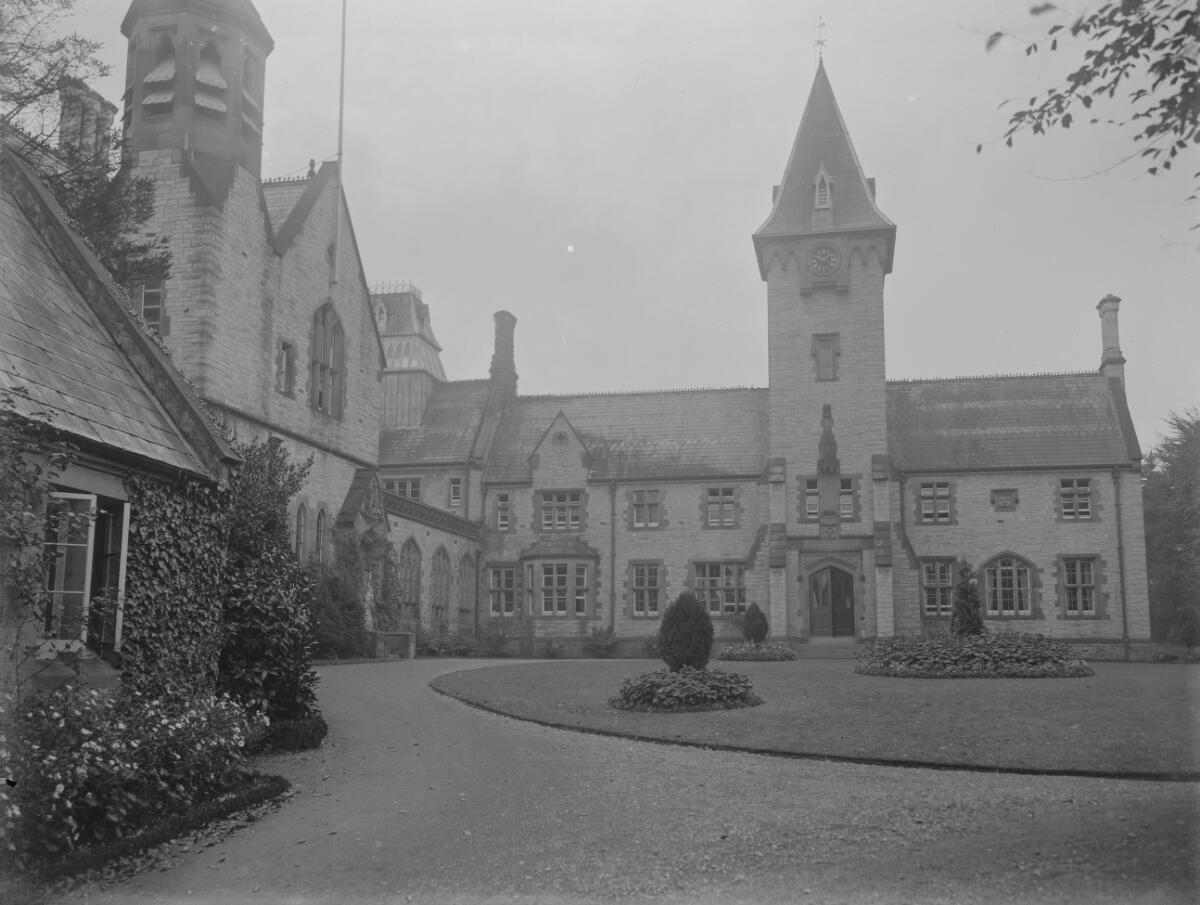
Howell's School in c. 1905

Emily Baldwin (1807 – 1880) was the first headmistress of Howell's School, Llandaff.

She was born 18 September 1807 to a London publishing family. Her father was Robert Baldwin, founder of the London Magazine, and her mother was his relative Maria Baldwin, daughter of the publisher Henry Baldwin. She had six siblings.

She ran a school at Leamington and was head of a school in Notting Hill for fourteen years until she was appointed headmistress of Howell's School, Llandaff, in 1860.

== Howell's School ==
Baldwin was appointed 'chief matron' by a London court of chancery to run the newly opened charitable school for girls, which was finally opened in 1860 after Welsh merchant Thomas Howell had left an endowment for its foundation in 1537. She oversaw the teaching of thirty orphans and thirty fee-paying boarders, and the school soon began to take day pupils. The school taught "the principles of the Christian Religion, Reading, Writing, Arithmetic, English Grammar, Geography, Biography, History, the Elements of Astronomy, Garden Botany, Music, French, Drawing and such subjects as the Governors may direct".

Expanding the curriculum to include geometry, Italian and Latin; selecting books; and teaching herself, Baldwin established a good reputation for the newly founded school, and by the 1870s it was catering mainly to the middle classes. Her affection and gentle methods were noted by her obituary and the school’s historian.

Baldwin retired due to ill health in 1872. She spent the rest of her life living in London, with her sisters or in a series of lodgings, her finances limited by her father’s struggling publishing company. She died on 2 December 1880.

She is one of four headmistresses of Howell's School to have a school House named after her, along with Maria Kendall, Eleanor Trotter, and Margaret Lewis.
