= Hugh Eliot (explorer) =

Hugh Eliot (Elyot)
- Born: c.1470
- Died: c.1535
- Occupation: merchant
- Organization: Company Adventurers to the New Found Land
- Known for: Exploration voyages to North America

Hugh Eliot (Elyot, Eliott, Ellyot) (c.1470 – c.1535) was a fifteenth-century Bristol merchant who was involved in the port's early Atlantic exploration voyages to North America. He was identified in the sixteenth century as one of the English 'discoverers of the Newfound Landes'.

== Early life ==
Little is known of Hugh Eliot's early life or career. He is not mentioned in the surviving published Bristol customs accounts of the 1470s. David Beers Quinn claimed Eliot was involved in a chancery action in 1485, based on a citation in Bristol's Great Red Book. However, the chancery case in question,TNA C1/135/76, actually dates to c.1506, having been transcribed and published by James Williamson in 1962. This makes the first known documentary reference to Hugh Eliot an entry in the Bristol customs accounts on 22 January 1493, importing wine from Seville. Given that a merchant would not normally conduct trade on their own behalf until they had completed their apprenticeship, aged at least twenty-one, it seems likely that Eliot was born c.1470.

== Atlantic Exploration ==
In a 1527 letter to Henry VIII the Bristol merchant Robert Thorne the younger claimed that Hugh Eliot and his father (also called Robert Thorne) were 'the discoverers of the Newfound Landes'. Writing in 1578, Queen Elizabeth's chief advisor on scientific matters, John Dee, claimed that Robert Thorne and Hugh Eliot made this discovery in 1494. However, it is not clear whether Dee had any evidence for this. It has often been assumed that Thorne and Eliot were involved in John Cabot's expeditions from the city from 1496-98, since it is known that Bristol merchants accompanied the 1497 expedition that resulted in the European discovery, or rediscovery, of North America.

Eliot's involvement in the Bristol exploration voyages of the years 1501-5, along with Robert Thorne and his brother, William, is better documented. On 7 January 1502, William Thorne, Robert Thorne and Hugh Eliot received a reward from Henry VII for buying a ship from Dieppe, which they renamed the Gabriel of Bristol. This immediately followed on from a personal reward by the king ‘men of Bristolle that founde thisle’. Hugh Eliot sailed on the ship as an 'assign' of a group who had been granted Letters Patent for western discovery in 1501, which included Robert Thorne and Thomas Ashurst. He was almost certainly one of the two 'merchauntes of bristoll that have bene in the newe founde landes’, who received a £20 reward from the King in late September 1502. This expedition brought back three native Americans who seem to have been taken into the King's household, a contemporary reporting two years later that he had seen:

two of them apparelled after [the manner of] Englishmen in Westminster Palace, which at that time I could not discern [i.e. tell them apart] from Englishmen, till I learned what men they were.

Following the expedition, Henry VII granted Eliot an annual pension (annuity) of £13 6s 8d (20 marks) by way of further reward. Eliot was also the one who claimed, on behalf of the explorers, the right to import merchandise from the new land free of customs duties, which in their case consisted of fish. At some time between 1502 and 1504 Eliot also received a reward of £100 from Henry VII towards his costs for sailing two ships to the 'Isle of new finding'.

On 9 December 1502, Henry VII issued a new and revised patent for exploration to a group of merchants. This included Hugh Eliot as the first named merchant. It is unclear whether they undertook an expedition in 1503, albeit they may have done, given that the king's household books recorded the receipt of Hawks 'from the newe founden Ilande’ in November 1503. There was certainly another expedition in 1504, organised by Eliot and Thorne, which included their ship, the Gabriel, along with another vessel called the Jesus of Bristol. On this voyage Sebastian Cabot (John Cabot's son) served as a pilot.

The 1504 expedition seems to have been the last undertaken by a group known as the Company Adventurers to the New Found Land. Relationships among the patentees broke down. By 1506 Hugh Eliot and another merchant William Clarke of London were suing each other over alleged debts relating to the expeditions, while a Portuguese member of the group, Francisco Fernandes, was appealing to the king over his imprisonment for a debt of £100 Eliot claimed he owed him.

== Life in Bristol ==
Like his business partner, Robert Thorne, Eliot was a member of Bristol's civic elite. In 1500, Eliot was granted a 10-year farm (a type of lease) of prise wines (a type of tax on wine). The impost was collected in Bristol, as in other ports, on behalf of the Crown. In September 1500 Eliot was elected to serve as one of the two sheriffs of Bristol for the coming year, a post that was typically reserved for those who had been members of the town council for several years.

Eliot continued his regular commerce throughout the period of the exploration voyages. He is cited as one of the merchants who laded goods on the Bonaventure of Bristol in March 1500 for a voyage from Lisbon to Bristol. In 1502 'Hugh Eliott' is recorded, along with William Thorne, as the purser on the Augustine of Bristol carrying wine from Bordeaux to Bristol. The surviving Bristol customs account for 1503/4 refers to goods he imported or exported to Andalusia, Algarve and Ireland worth £164. This included goods dispatched on the Matthew of Bristol, which had been employed by John Cabot on his 1497 expedition. In March 1505 Eliot imported Bay salt from the well-known saltpans of Brouage in Gascony. Further details of his trade are lost with the loss of so many of Bristol's customs accounts.

In the early 1500s, Eliot's apprentices included Thomas Howell, who would later become one of England's richest cloth merchants. Howell's own mercantile accounts show that Eliot owed him a substantial sum of money. Still owing in 1522, by 1528 Howell thought that the debt was probably uncollectable.

In 1510 Eliot was sued by a former business partner, John Vaughan, in Bristol's Staple Court for a variety of unpaid debts. Another action in the Staple Court reveals that the two men had formally been co-owners of a ship called the John. Vaughan later sued Eliot for payment of another old debt, which led Eliot to petitioning the Lord Chancellor, Cardinal Thomas Wolsey, for redress, c.1516-18. Eliot is recorded exporting woollen cloth from Bristol in 1517 through and importing fish from Ireland in 1525 and exporting grain. Margaret Condon and Evan Jones (University of Bristol), claim to have 'certain' evidence that Eliot survived until at least the mid 1530s and remained commercially active in Bristol.
