= Robert Thorne (explorer) =

English merchant (died 1519)

- Born: c. 1460
- Died: Before July 1519; Bristol
- Occupation: merchant
- Known for: Exploration of North America
- Spouse(s): Johane Withypoll (c.1491-1519), d. 1523
- Children: Robert Thorne the younger, Elyn, Nicholas Thorne, Catherine, Alice
- Parent(s): Thomas Thorne (d.1471), Rose

Robert Thorne the elder (died 1519) was an English merchant from Bristol who was involved in the port's early Atlantic exploration voyages to North America. He was identified in the sixteenth century as one of the English 'discoverers of the Newfound Landes'.

== Early life ==
Robert Thorne was the fourth son of Thomas Thorne of St Albans (died 1471).

Thorne is first mentioned in the Bristol customs accounts of 1479–1480, carrying sugar from Lisbon and small quantities of wine and woad dye from Bordeaux. He is not recorded as a merchant in the surviving accounts of the 1470s. His absence from the earlier accounts, followed by small scale trading and a marriage c.1490, might imply that he was born c.1460.

Thorne married Johane Withypoll with whom he had five children, Robert Thorne the younger (1492-1532), Elyn, Nicholas Thorne (1496-1546), Catherine and Alice.

== Atlantic exploration ==
Thorne's son, Robert Thorne the younger, claimed in a 1527 letter to Henry VIII that it was his father, along with another Bristol merchant called Hugh Eliot, who were 'the discoverers of the Newfound Landes'. Writing in 1578, Queen Elizabeth's chief advisor on scientific matters, John Dee, claimed that Robert Thorne and Hugh Eliot made this discovery in 1494. However, it is not clear whether Dee had any evidence for this. It has often been assumed that Thorne and Eliot were involved in John Cabot's expeditions from the city from 1496-98, since it is known that Bristol merchants accompanied the 1497 expedition that resulted in the European discovery, or rediscovery, of North America.

Thorne's involvement in the Bristol exploration voyages of the years 1501–1505, along with his brother, William, and his business partner, Hugh Eliot, is better documented. On 19 March 1501, a group of Bristol and Portuguese merchants received Letters Patent for western discovery. This group included the Bristol merchants Richard Warde, Thomas Ashurst and John Thomas but did not include Robert Thorne or Eliot. That may be because they were still operating under the terms of John Cabot's 1496 Letters Patent. It seems likely that Thorne and Eliot undertook a voyage in 1501. On 7 January 1502, William Thorne, Robert Thorne and Hugh Eliot received a reward from Henry VII for buying a ship from Dieppe, which they renamed the Gabriel of Bristol. This immediately followed on from a personal reward by the king ‘men of Bristolle that founde thisle’. The Gabriel was subsequently used for expeditions to Newfoundland in 1502 and 1504. Thorne, along with Hugh Eliot were very likely two of ‘the merchauntes of bristoll that have bene in the newe founde landes’, who were given a £20 reward by the King in late September 1502. On 9 December 1502, Henry VII issued a new and revised patent for exploration. The new patent excluded some of the merchants from the 1501 patent but now formally including Hugh Eliot, as part of the syndicate.

Hugh Eliot and Thorne seem to have been the principal organisers of the 1504 voyage from Bristol to the new found land, on which Sebastian Cabot (John Cabot's son) served as a pilot. Thorne did not, however, take part in the 1504 voyage personally, since he was called on to serve as a sheriff of Bristol at the start of 1504, following the unexpected death of Richard Ap Merike, one of the serving sheriffs.

== Later life and death ==
Thorne continued to trade as a merchant to European destinations during the period of the Bristol discovery voyages. In the 1503/4 customs accounts for Bristol he traded goods valued at £395 10s., mostly to Andalusia, but also to Biscay for iron and wine from Bordeaux. In the accounts for 1516/17, he was trading exclusively to Sanlúcar in Andalusia, sometimes alongside his son, Nicholas, exporting English woollen cloth and importing wine and dyestuffs.

In 1510 Thorne was appointed to a commission of the Admiralty in connection with trade to Portugal and in 1514-15 he served as Mayor of Bristol. In 1518, as an alderman (former mayor) and steward of Bristol, Thorne was appointed to go to London to represent the corporation in a dispute being heard in Star Chamber. It seems he died while on this assignment and was buried there in the Temple Church, near Fleet Street before July 1519. The text of his epitaph was printed by Richard Hakluyt, the sixteenth-century historian of English discoveries. The epitaph confirms that Robert Thorne the elder served as 'praetor' (mayor) of Bristol. Some later chroniclers claimed that it was his son, Robert Thorne the younger (b.1492), who was mayor. However, the younger Robert would have been only 23 in 1514. No contemporary documents suggest he was mayor.

Robert Thorne the elder's last will and testament was written 20 Jan 1518 and proved on 6 July 1519. Although his will requested burial in the crypt of St Nicholas Church, Bristol he died whilst on business in London in 1519 and was buried there. Thorne was clearly a rich merchant, leaving £200 in cash and 200 oz. silver plate to his wife, among other goods and £60 in cash and 60 oz. in silver plate to each of his three surviving children, Robert, Nicholas and Alice. He also made substantial bequests to the Church and other charitable causes around Bristol.
