= Nicholas Thorne (merchant) =

Bristol merchant, 1496–1546

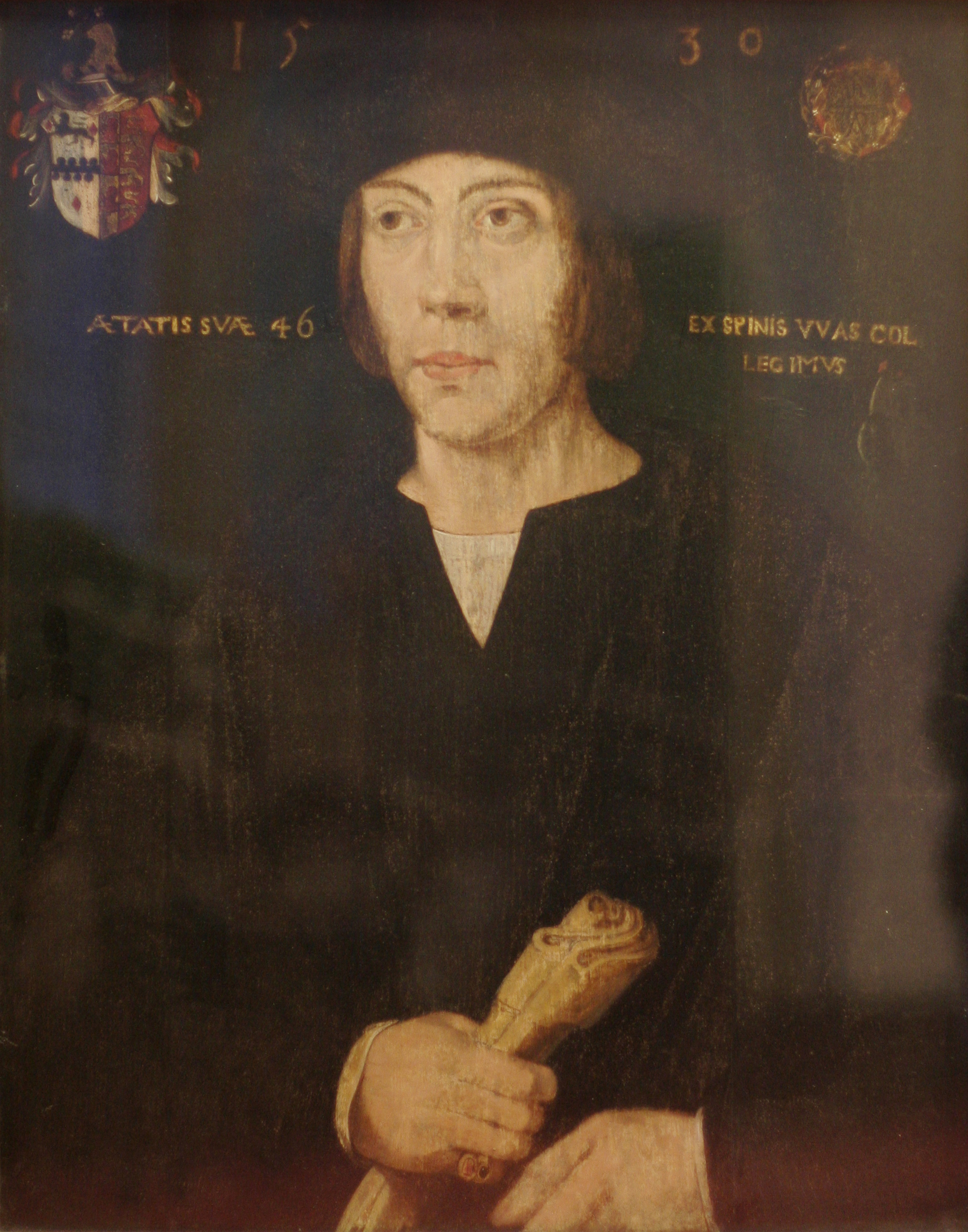
- Portrait of Nicholas Thorne in Bristol Grammar School. A 1624 copy of the original.
- Born: 1496
- Died: 1546 (aged 49–50); Bristol
- Occupation: merchant
- Known for: Founding of Bristol Grammar School, Mayor of Bristol
- Parent(s): Robert Thorne the elder (d.1519), Johane Withypoll (d. 1523)
- Relatives: Robert Thorne d. 1532(brother), Elyn, Catherin, Alice (sisters)

Nicholas Thorne (1496 – 19 August 1546) was a sixteenth-century Bristol merchant. He is best known for co-founding Bristol Grammar School, along with his brother Robert Thorne.

== Early life ==
Thorne was born 1496, the second son of the Bristol merchant and explorer Robert Thorne the elder and Johane Withypoll, who came from another wealthy merchant family.

Like his brother, Robert Thorne the younger, Nicholas must have been apprenticed as a merchant. This typically began around 13–16 years old and lasted at least seven years. Nicholas Thorne would therefore have finished his training around 1517 and been eligible to become a freeman on Bristol, able to set up his own firm in the town and vote in municipal elections.

== Career ==
By 1517 Nicholas Thorne was trading independently from Bristol to Sanlúcar de Barrameda in Andalusia. He appears frequently in the surviving Bristol customs accounts of the 1520s–40s. From Sanlúcar, Thorne had extended his trade in the 1520s to deal with the Canary Islands. The Elizabethan historian Richard Hakluyt reported that, according to an old commercial ledger he had examined of "M. Nicholas Thorne the elder a worshipfull marchant of the city of Bristoll", Thorne had an "ordinarie trade of marchandise unto the Canarie Islands". This was handled by his servant, William Ballard, in Sanlúcar. In 1526 Thorne had cloth and soap sent from Andalusia to delivered to Santa Cruz in Tenerife, with orders to bring back orchil, sugar and kid skins.

In 1528–1529 Thorne served as one of the two sheriffs of Bristol. When Henry VIII stayed in his manor at Thornbury in August 1535, Nicholas Thorne was one of three members of Bristol's Common Council who were chosen to visit him, presenting the king with "ten fat oxen and 40 sheep towards his hospitality" as well as gold and a silver cup. Henry was reportedly unable to visit Bristol itself because of a Plague outbreak in the city. Another manuscript chronicle claimed that despite this, the king:

came disguised to Bristol with certain gentlemen to Mr. Thorn's house, and secretly viewed the city, which Mr. Thorn shewed him; and he said to Mr. Thorn, this is now but the towne of Bristol, but I will make it the city of Bristol: which he afterward did by erecting it into a bishop's see.

Around 1535, Thorne petitioned Henry VIII in relation to his 250-ton ship, the Saviour of Bristol, which was then the port's greatest vessel. Thorne noted that he had inherited the ship from his brother, Robert Thorne (d.1532), who had returned to England in 1531 intending to give the king "relation of countries to be discovered and by the same ship and others intended through your Grace's aid to discover and seek new countries". Following Robert's death, the Saviour had been employed to trade with the Levant. From 1536–7, Thorne had the ship "new made" with the king's help. In 1539, the Saviour was conscripted into the navy to defend England against a feared invasion by France and Spain following the excommunication of Henry VIII by the Pope in December 1538. On 10 April 1539, Thorne reported to Thomas Cromwell, the King's chief minister, that the Saviour was ready to depart Bristol to join the English fleet at Portsmouth "with flags and streamers of your Lordship's colours and arms".

In 1537 Nicholas Thorne served as one of the two M.P.s for Bristol.

During the English Reformation of the 1530s, Thorne seems to have alienated some protestant reformers. In 1538–1539 he was attacked as "the nigard [stingy] Thorne" and the "knave, Nicoll. Thorne" in abusive letters sent by radical Protestants. These letters were a response to the imprisonment for heresy in Bristol of the protestant preacher, George Wishart.

The ledger of the Bristol merchant, John Smyth, contains numerous references to his commercial dealings with Nicholas Thorne in the 1540s. The ledger reveals that in 1540, Thorne, Smyth and a number of other Bristol merchants established a company to import woad dye from the Azores. The ledger also shows that both Thorne and Smyth, along with many other Bristol merchants were involved in smuggling, illicitly exporting "prohibited wares" such as foodstuff and leather from England to Spain. The Bristol customs accounts of the early 1540s suggest Thorne was the port's wealthiest merchant by that time, controlling 7% of the port's declared overseas trade.

In the Lay Subsidy rolls of 1545, Nicholas Thorne, along with John Smythe, were assessed as the richest citizens of Bristol, each of whom were to pay £15 to the Crown. This was three times more than any other person in the city.

In 1544–5 Thorne served as mayor of Bristol. During his tenure he had to contend with "a great plague in Bristoll which continued a whole year". The historian Paul Slack calculated that between August 1544 and July 1545 the death rate in Bristol rose about seven fold.

== Family ==
According of the "Pedigree of Thorne" published by Moore Smith, Nicholas Thorne married a woman called Mary in 1530, with whom he had a least five children: Robert, Nicholas, Edward, Frances and Mary. He then married a widow called Bridget in 1542, with whom he had three more children: John, Bridget and Richard. The pedigree is slightly at odds with Nicholas Thorne's memorial brass.

== Bequests and death ==
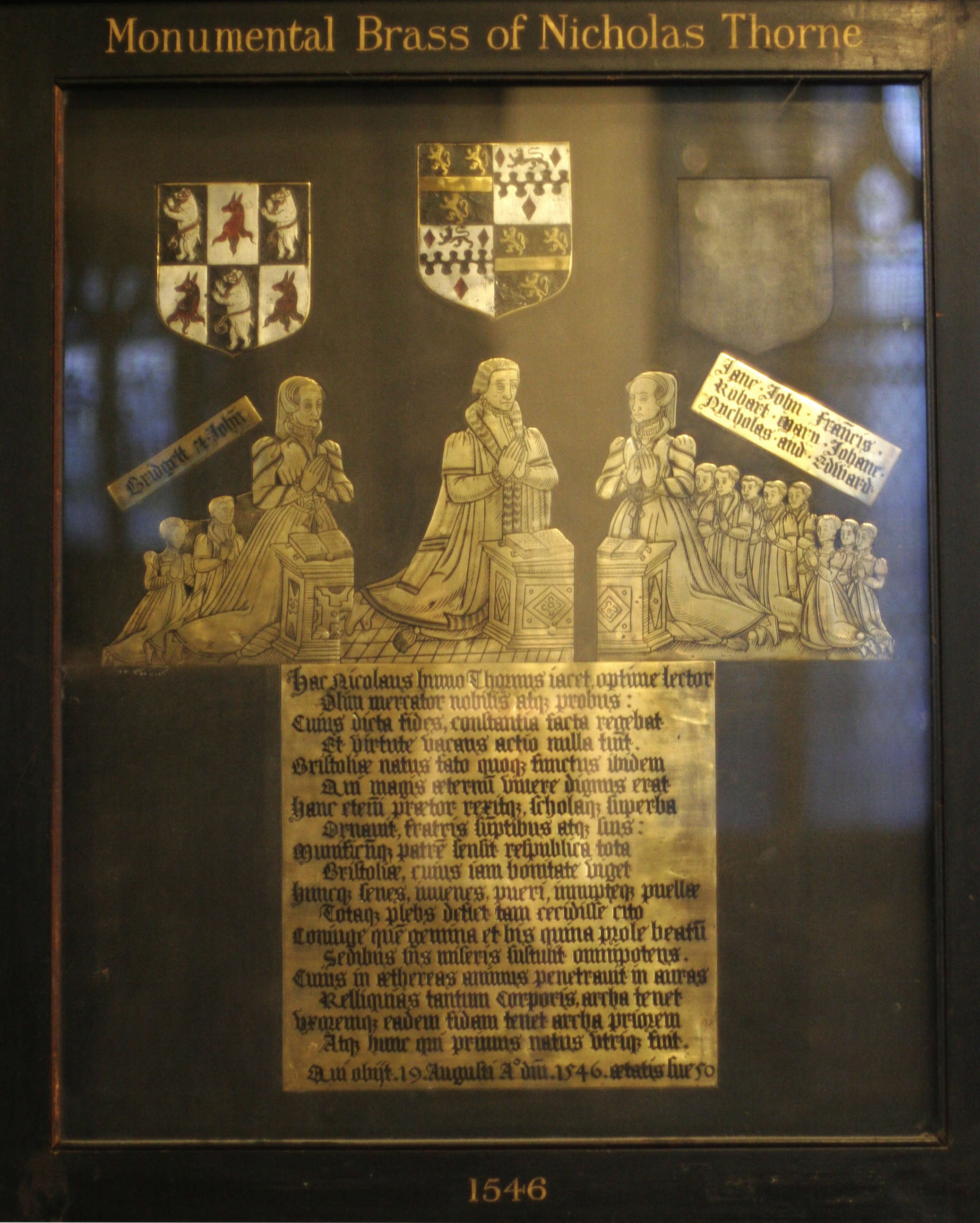
Memorial brass to Nicholas Thorne, 1546

On 31 January 1532 Nicholas Thorne and his brother and business partner, Robert Thorne took out an indenture to transfer an existing Bristol school into their hands. In return they undertook to make a school house for a free grammar school. This school would become Bristol Grammar School. It received a royal charter from Henry VIII on 17 March 1532. Thorne, along with his brother, Robert, are regarded as founders of the school, with the school's motto Ex Spinis Uvas (Grapes from Thorns) being a play on their surname.

When Thorne's business associate, Thomas Howell, died in Seville in 1537, he left Nicholas 1000 gold ducats on the understanding that he would distribute it to places and people in Bristol that both his father, Robert Thorne the elder and his brother, Robert Thorne the younger, had made bequests.

Nicholas Thorne made his will on 4 August 1546. This included bequests to convey to the Corporation of Bristol the hospital and estates of St Bartholomew's Hospital, which housed and supported Bristol Grammar School.

Nicholas was buried in St Werburgh's church, on Corn Street, Bristol. A memorial brass, now in Bristol Grammar School, was erected at the east end of St Werburgh. It records Thorne's date of death as 19 August 1546, aged 50 and confirms that he was a former mayor of the city. The brass depicts him at prayer. On the right-hand of the brass kneels his first wife, Mary, and their eight children: Jane, John, Frances, Robert, Mary, Johane, Nicholas and Edward. On the left is Bridget, his second wife, and their children, Bridget and John. In an English translation by Cecil T. Davis, the inscription of this brass reads:

Low in this earth here Nicholas named Thorn, good reader see,
A Merchant rich and trustworthy within these walls was he,
Whose words and deeds alike by truth and faith were ever swayed,
And destitute of honour's stamp no action which he made.
In Bristol born, he here by fate his life laid down,
Who rather seemed worthy to be of an eternal crown.
This City well he ruled as Mayor, and with a school full large
And stately did adorn, at his own and brother's charge.
The City's whole community a grateful sense retains
Of her too liberal father while his benefit remains.
Old men and young, boys, dowerless girls, the mass of Bristol's poor,
Weep his removal from their midst, who spent so full a store.
By double wedlock he was blessed with children numbering ten
When power divine his soul conveyed from wretched haunts of men,
While his freed sprite with ready joy roams o’er the heavenly plains.
This tomb you see his body's baser part alone retains,
The while it also holds in trust his first and faithful wife
And him on whom their mutual love bestowed his firstborn life.

The surviving painting of Nicholas Thorne now hanging in Bristol Grammar School, along with a similar one of his brother, Robert, are both copies produced in 1624 from originals borrowed from a Wiltshire family.
