= Sir James Smyth, 1st Baronet =

Sir James Smyth, 1st Baronet (c. 1686 – 28 February 1717) was a baronet in the Baronetage of Great Britain.

He was the only son of Alderman Sir James Smyth, a London draper and Lord Mayor of London, 1684–85, by his second wife, Elizabeth, daughter and co-heir of Arthur Shirley of Isfield, Sussex. Alderman Smyth was the second son of Sir Robert Smyth, 1st Baronet of Upton, Essex. He married Elizabeth Shirley in June 1682, and died aged 72 on 9 December 1706.

James Smyth was born about 1686, and matriculated at Balliol College, Oxford, on 16 September 1702 aged 16. He succeeded to his father's estate in December 1706, and was created a baronet on 2 December 1714. He was Sheriff of Sussex, 1714–15.

He married Mirabella, daughter of Sir Robert Legard, Master in Chancery. She died on 21 February 1714, aged 29. James Smyth died aged 31 on 28 February 1717. Both were buried with his parents at West Ham; he was succeeded by his only son, Robert.

Sir Robert Smyth, 2nd Baronet, was born about 1709. He married Louisa Caroline Isabella, youngest daughter of John Hervey, 1st Earl of Bristol, on 23 September 1731. She died on 11 May 1770 aged 55, and was buried at West Ham. He died on 10 December 1783 aged 74, and was buried alongside his wife. He was succeeded by his only son, Hervey.

Sir Hervey Smyth, 3rd Baronet, was born in 1734. He became Page of Honour to George II of Great Britain, and was aide-de-camp to General James Wolfe at the siege of Quebec in 1759, becoming afterwards Colonel in the Foot Guards. He died unmarried aged 77 on 2 October 1811, when the baronetcy became extinct. His only sister Anna Mirabella Henrietta, born in 1738, married William Beale Brand, of Polsted Hall, Suffolk, in 1761.

Baronetage of Great Britain
New creation	Baronet (of Isfield); 1714–1717	Succeeded by Robert Smyth
