= Ballinderry, Kilcronaghan civil parish =

Ballinderry Baile an Daire
- townland

Irish transcription(s)
  - Derivation: Baile an Daire
  - Meaning: "Homestead of the oakwood"
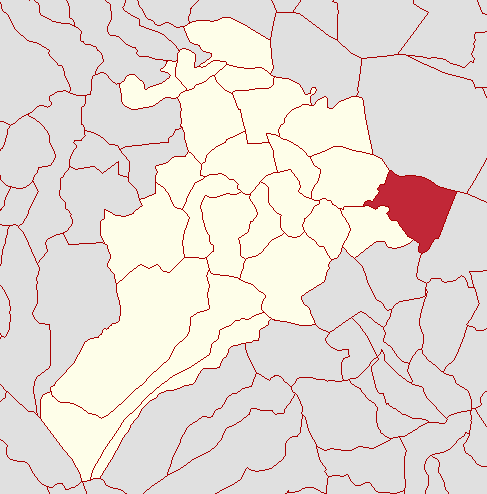

- Ballinderry shown within Northern Ireland Ballinderry (the United Kingdom)
- Coordinates: 54°47′42″N 6°39′29″W
- Sovereign state: United Kingdom
- Country: Northern Ireland
- County: County Londonderry
- Barony: Loughinsholin
- Civil parish: Kilcronaghan
- Plantation grant: Vintners Company
- First recorded: 1609

Government
  - Council: Mid Ulster District
  - Ward: Tobermore

Area
  - Total: 391.1 acres (158.27 ha)
- Irish grid ref: H864950

Ballinderry (locally [ˌbalənˈdɛri], from Irish Baile an Daire 'homestead of the oakwood') is a townland lying within the civil parish of Kilcronaghan, County Londonderry, Northern Ireland. It lies on the eastern boundary of the parish; partly bounded by the parishes of Termoneeny and Desertmartin to the north and east. It is also bounded by the townlands of Ballynahone More, Drumsamney, Dromore, Grange, and Gortamney. It was apportioned to the Vintners company.

The townland was part of Tobermore electoral ward of the former Magherafelt District Council, however in 1926 it was part of Tobermore district electoral division as part of the Maghera division of Magherafelt Rural District. It was also part of the historic barony of Loughinsholin.

== History ==
Population
Year	Pop.
1841	176
1851	108
1861	134
1871	158
1881	100
1891	67
1901	57
1911	69
1926	65

Size (acres, roods, poles)
Year	a, r, p
1851	390, 3, 39
1881	389, 1, 13
1901	389, 1, 13
1926	391, 1, 36

Earlier recorded forms
Year	Form
1609	B-derry (E.C.)
1613	Derrey
1654	Ballinderry
1659c	Ballinderry, ye ^{1}/_{2} towne of
1663	Ballyderry, half
1767	Balenderry
_{(E.C.) - Escheated Counties Map 1609}

== See also ==
- Kilcronaghan
- List of townlands in Tobermore
- Tobermore
