= Mary Wynne Warner =

Welsh mathematician (1932–1998)

Mary Wynne Warner (née Davies; 22 June 1932 – 1 April 1998) was a Welsh mathematician, specializing in fuzzy mathematics. Her obituary in the Bulletin of the London Mathematical Society noted that fuzzy topology was "the field in which she was one of the pioneers and recognized as one of the leading figures for the past thirty years."

== Early life and education ==
Mary Wynne Davies was born in Carmarthen, Wales, the elder daughter of Sydney and Esther Davies (née Jones), where the family resided until she was six years old. She was raised and received the first ten years of her education in Llandovery, where her father was a schoolmaster at the local grammar school. Attaining ten Distinctions in her School Certificate exams, she received the remainder of her secondary education at Howell's Boarding School, Denbigh in order to facilitate her study of physics.

Both a Draper's Company Exhibition and an Open Scholarship were awarded to Warner following academic distinction at Howell's. This facilitated her undergraduate study of mathematics at Somerville College, Oxford, commencing in 1951 and from which she graduated in 1953 with a second-class degree.

Warner had acquired various academic prizes at both the college and university level during her undergraduate degree, allowing her to progress to doctoral work in Oxford via a Research Scholarship. In 1956 her earliest research paper, 'A note on Borsuk's antipodal point theorem in the Oxford Quarterly Journal of Mathematics' was published under the supervision of the Waynflete Chair of Pure Mathematics, J.H.C Whitehead. During this period, Warner was initiated into his notable and prolific algebraic topology research group.

Amid her academic study, Warner began a romantic relationship with Gerald Warner, who had read history at Oxford, and after graduating in 1954 had embarked upon a career in the Diplomatic Service's Intelligence Branch. She would marry Warner in 1956 before his assignment to Beijing, China. The transient nature of his occupation disrupted her ability to participate formally in academia and terminated her doctoral studies at Oxford, but she continued to dedicate herself to mathematical research to the extent that the demands of being a diplomat's wife would allow.

== Career and legacy ==
The trajectory of Warner's career was shaped by her husband's overseas diplomatic assignments.

Whilst stationed in Beijing between 1956 and 1958 Warner continued her involvement with Oxford's Whitehead research group, working alongside prominent Chinese topologist Chang Su-chen until escalating political tensions forced them to terminate communication in 1958.

The family subsequently returned to London, England for a period between 1958 and 1960 during which Mary lectured part-time at Bedford College; this was followed by a year overseas in Rangoon, Burma. Under her instruction and direction as senior lecturer in mathematics at Rangoon University, its first MSc Mathematics program was developed. Prior to this, full-time employment was unheard of for the wives of Britain's diplomats; Mary was the first woman in this position to violate this convention. Two years (1962–1964) were then spent in London, where Mary resumed her lectureship at Bedford College.

Warner's association with the Whitehead research group resumed in Warsaw, Poland between 1964 and 1966. At the University of Warsaw, a dynamic and industrious research circle, concerned primarily with topology, flourished under Karol Borsuk. In these intellectually stimulating conditions, Mary took a position as a visiting research fellow, recommencing work on her doctoral thesis under the supervision of Andrzej Bialynicki-Birula. This thesis - 'The homology of Cartesian product spaces' - would be completed during a two-year assignment in Geneva, Switzerland, and examined by Borsuk and Kuratowski. Warner was then awarded her doctorate by the Polish Academy of Sciences. This accomplishment was also notable for it being the first instance of a diplomatic wife acquiring a doctorate abroad.

A relocation to London in 1968 permitted Mary to take up a long-term position as a lecturer at City University, an institution which would constitute the home of her future academic career. Accounting to her time abroad, Warner was now on the margins of her Oxford-era interest of homotopy theory research, much of her knowledge obsolete due to significant advancements in her absence. Accordingly, she diverted her efforts towards publishing research in the newly emergent field of fuzzy topology. In 1969, The homology of tensor products was published.

A final, brief interruption before Warner could apply herself entirely to mathematics, was a relocation to Malaysia in 1974 for a two-year duration. She was distinguished by being the sole person to have taught at Kuala Lumpur's Chinese and Malaysian universities, and her academic career continued on its upwards trajectory upon returning to her lectureship at City University in 1976, her research now of sufficient novelty and quality as to attract international attention and invitations to major conferences - a seminal point.

Warner's output between 1980 and 1985 of 20 papers on the subjects of tolerance spaces and automata, and her conceptualisation of the 'lattice-valued relation' towards the end of this period rendered her eminent in the field of fuzzy topology, and these achievements culminated in her promotion to a readership at the City University in 1983, and then a professorship in 1996. During her tenure at the university's Mathematics department, she developed a curriculum for and implemented an MSc in mathematics, and her aptitude in teaching at both the undergraduate and postgraduate level was noted.

Warner is generally acknowledged as having been imperative in providing early fuzzy topology research with a stabilising foundation, from which new results could be found, which were not purely descriptive of existing topological definitions. The quantity of people with whom she co-authored papers is indicative of her role in bolstering the profile of the field of fuzzy topology.

The broader application of Mary's work in fuzzy topology involves the prediction of real-world events which are always imprecise – nuclear reactor failure and the occurrence of earthquakes.

== Personal life ==
Mary Wynne Davies married diplomat and intelligence officer Sir Gerald Warner in 1956. They had three children, Sian (b. 1958), Jonathan (b. 1959), and Rachel (b. 1961), who were born in Beijing, London, and Rangoon, Burma, respectively.

Mary's interests outside mathematics included Asian pottery, having a study collection exhibited at the Ashmolean Museum, Oxford after her time in the continent in the mid-Seventies. Also important to Warner was the poetry of her native Wales.

The improvement of education was also of significance to Warner, who served on the Court of the University of Wales Institute of Science and Technology, as the vice-chairman of the Governing Body of Geneva's International School, and as the governor of Lindisfarne College.

Ill health had compelled Warner to retire a year early from her position at the City University, but she did not abandon either her postgraduate teaching or her research, which was still ongoing when she died in Spain in 1998, aged 65. She was buried in the Kemerton churchyard in Tewksbury, England, where two of her children were already interred.
