= Smyth baronets of Isfield (1714) =

Escutcheon of the Smyth baronets of Isfield

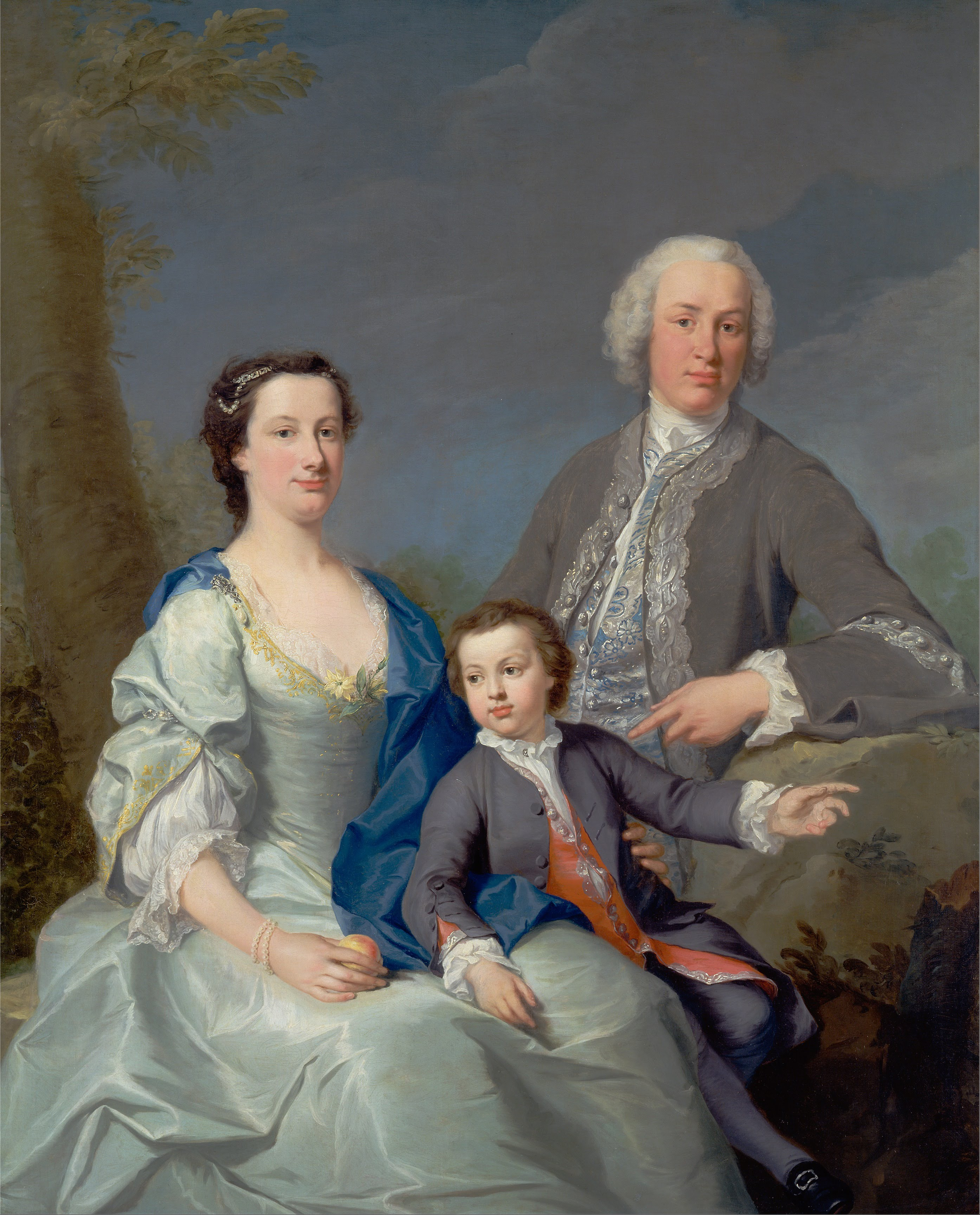
Sir Robert Smyth, 2nd Baronet of Isfield, and Lady Smyth with their son, Sir Hervey Smith, 3rd Baronet of Isefeld, group portrait by Andrea Soldi

The Smyth baronetcy, of Isfield in the County of Sussex, was created in the Baronetage of Great Britain on 2 December 1714 for James Smyth. His father, Sir James Smyth (1633–1706), Lord Mayor of London, was the second son of the 1st Baronet of the second creation.

The 3rd Baronet was aide de camp to General Wolfe at the Battle of Quebec. The title became extinct on his death in 1811.

== Smyth baronets, of Isfield (1714) ==
- Sir James Smyth, 1st Baronet (c. 1686–1717)
- Sir Robert Smyth, 2nd Baronet (c.1709–1783)
- Sir Hervey Smyth, 3rd Baronet (1734–1811), died unmarried.

== Notes ==
Baronetage of Great Britain
Preceded by Eyles baronets	Smyth baronets of Isfield; 2 December 1714	Succeeded by Page baronets
