= Smyth baronets of Redcliff (1661) =

Escutcheon of the Smyth baronets of Redcliff

The Smyth baronetcy, of Redcliff in the County of Buckingham, was created in the Baronetage of England on 10 May 1661 for William Smyth. He was a staunch Royalist, Governor of Hillesden in the Civil War, and a member of the Long Parliament.

The title became extinct on the death of the 2nd Baronet in 1732.

== Smyth baronets, of Redcliff (1661) ==
- Sir William Smyth, 1st Baronet (c. 1616–1696)
- Sir Thomas Smyth, 2nd Baronet (1696–1732).
