= Smyth baronets of Teignmouth (1956) =

Escutcheon of the Smyth baronets of Teignmouth

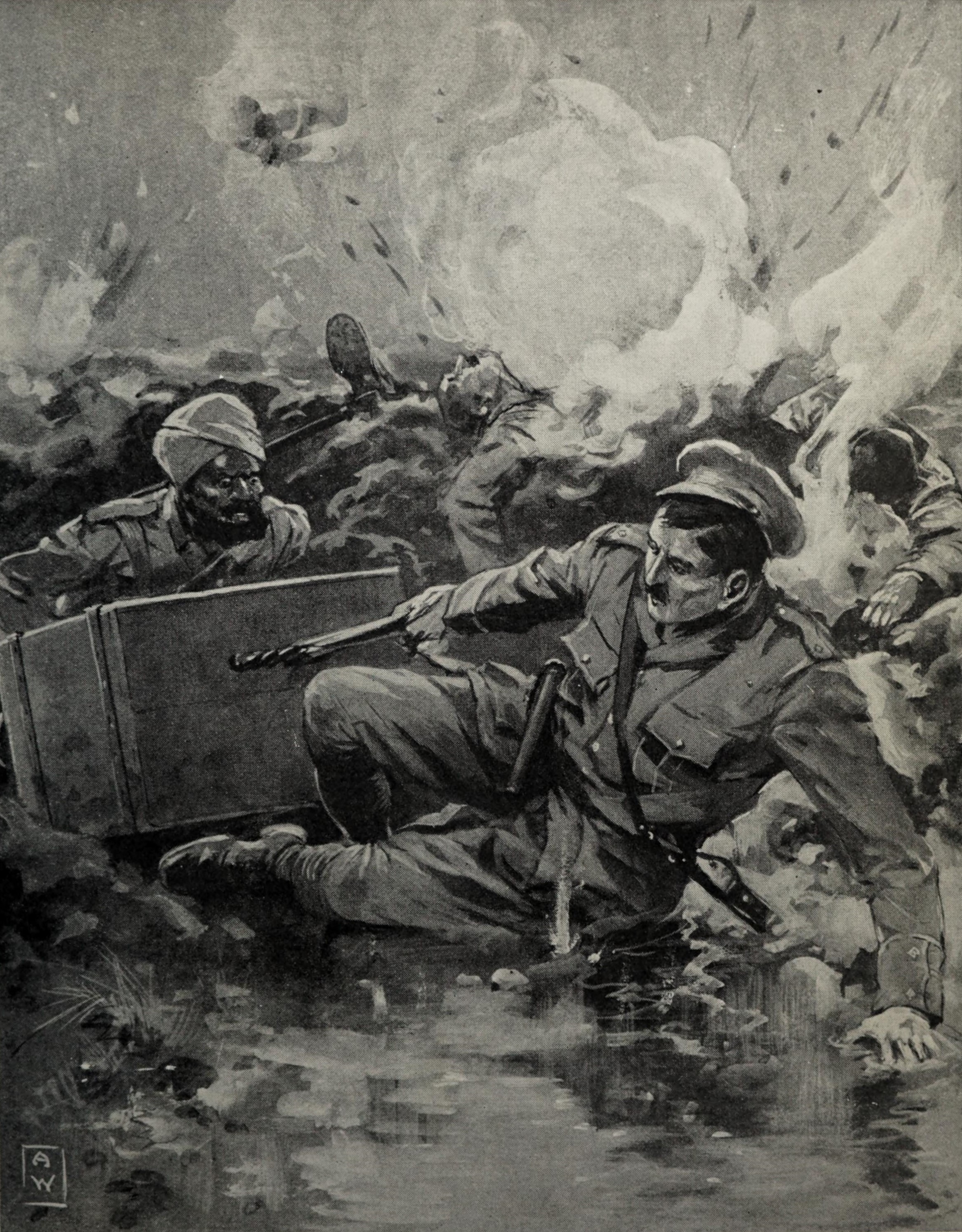
Sir George Smyth, 1st Baronet, of Teignmouth; drawing of Smyth's actions during the First World War, for which he was awarded the Victoria Cross

The Smyth baronetcy, of Teignmouth in the County of Devon, was created in the Baronetage of the United Kingdom on 23 January 1956 for the soldier and politician John Smyth. He was Member of Parliament for Norwood from 1950 to 1966.

As of 2026, the title is held by his grandson, the 2nd Baronet, who succeeded in 1983.

== Smyth baronets, of Teignmouth (1956) ==
- Sir John George Smyth VC MC, 1st Baronet (1893–1983)
- Sir Timothy John Smyth, 2nd Baronet (born 1953)

The heir apparent to the Baronetcy is the present holder's eldest son, Brendan Julian Smyth (born 1981).

== Extended family ==
- John Lawrence Smyth (1921–1944), eldest son of the 1st Baronet, was killed in action at Kohima, India.
- Julian Smyth (1923–1974) was the second son of the 1st Baronet and father of the 2nd Baronet.
