= John Henry Greville Smyth =

Sir John Henry Greville Smyth, 1st Baronet (2 January 1836 – 27 September 1901) was an English naturalist and collector of natural history specimens. He is best known for his large private collection of mammals, birds, and insects kept at his stately home of Ashton Court in Bristol. On his death his wife, Lady Emily Greville Smyth, donated the bulk of the collection to the Bristol Natural History Museum, now known as Bristol Museum and Art Gallery.

== Life ==
John Henry Greville Upton was born in Bath, Somerset on 2 January 1836, the second son of Thomas Upton Esq. He was educated at Eton College and Christ Church, Oxford, and on the death of his grandmother in 1852 succeeded to the Ashton Court estate. That year he took the name John Henry Greville Smyth.

By the time he was 27, the estate provided him £27,087 per year. He used this sizable income to fund tours across the British Empire and beyond (India, Egypt, Algeria, Australia, New Zealand, Jamaica, South America, and the United States of America, as well as extensive travel across Europe), where he hunted mammals and birds, and collected a vast number of birds' eggs.

Greville Smyth had built up such a large collection of specimens that in 1884 he commissioned the architect Charles Edward Davis to create a museum in his home. The museum, along with other alterations, were completed 18 months later in 1885.

== Family ==
Smyth married his cousin Emily Edwards (née Way), the widow of George Oldham Edwards, in 1884, when he was 48 years old. He died in 1901, and Emily died in 1914. They had no children and the estate passed to Emily's daughter from her first marriage, Esme.

Baronetage of the United Kingdom
New creation	Baronet (of Ashton Court); 1859–1901	Extinct
