= Smyth baronets of Upton (1665) =

Escutcheon of the Smyth baronets of Upton

The Smyth baronetcy, of Upton in the County of Essex, was created in the Baronetage of England on 30 March 1665 for Robert Smyth of Upton, West Ham. He was a silkman of London, whose first wife Judith was a niece of Thomas Walmsley.

He was succeeded by his eldest son, the 2nd Baronet. The latter's eldest son, the 3rd Baronet, sat as Member of Parliament for Andover. The 5th Baronet represented Cardigan in the House of Commons. The 6th Baronet was Member of Parliament for Colchester. The title became extinct on his death in 1852.

== Smyth baronets, of Upton (1665) ==
- Sir Robert Smyth, 1st Baronet (c. 1594–1669)
- Sir Robert Smyth, 2nd Baronet (c. 1630–d. by 1695)
- Sir Robert Smyth, 3rd Baronet (c. 1659–1745)
- Sir Trafford Smyth, 4th Baronet (c. 1720–1765)
- Sir Robert Smyth, 5th Baronet (1744–1802)
- Sir George Henry Smyth, 6th Baronet (1784–1852)

== Extended family ==
James Smyth, the second son of the 1st Baronet and Lord Mayor of London in 1684, was the father of the 1st Baronet of the Smyth baronets of Isfield (1714).
