= Coat of arms of the Drapers Company =

Arms of the Worshipful Company of Drapers: Azure, three clouds radiated proper each adorned with a triple crown or

Heraldic achievement of the Worshipful Company of Drapers

The Worshipful Company of Drapers, informally known as the Drapers' Company and formally known as The Master and Wardens and Brethren and Sisters of the Guild or Fraternity of the Blessed Mary the Virgin of the Mystery of Drapers of the City of London, was probably the first corporate body in England to be granted a coat of arms, on 10 March 1438/9 by Sir William Bruges, Garter King of Arms. The patent dated 1439 is the earliest surviving such grant of arms made to a corporate body in England. The arms were modified in 1561, when the crest was added and the lion supporters granted. These grants were superseded in 1613 with minor modifications. The modern blazon is: Azure, three clouds radiated proper each adorned with a triple crown or. The triple crown contains a cap (velvet/fabric lining visible through the gold structure) gules.

The arms is also used by Bancroft's School in London, supported by the Company.

== Original grant ==
The Drapers Company received its original grant of arms in 1439, from Sir William Bruges, Garter King of Arms. The "Fraternity" was founded under the protection of Blessed Mary the Virgin, which is reflected in the iconography of the arms. The Garter King explained his design of the arms as follows:

"That is to say in honour of the very glorious Virgin and Mother Mary who is in the shadow of the sun and yet shines with all clearness and purity. I have devised in the blazon three sunbeams issuing from three flaming clouds crowned with three Imperial crowns of gold on a shield of azure".

The original arms had supporters of two angels.

=== Greenway Porch depiction (1517) ===
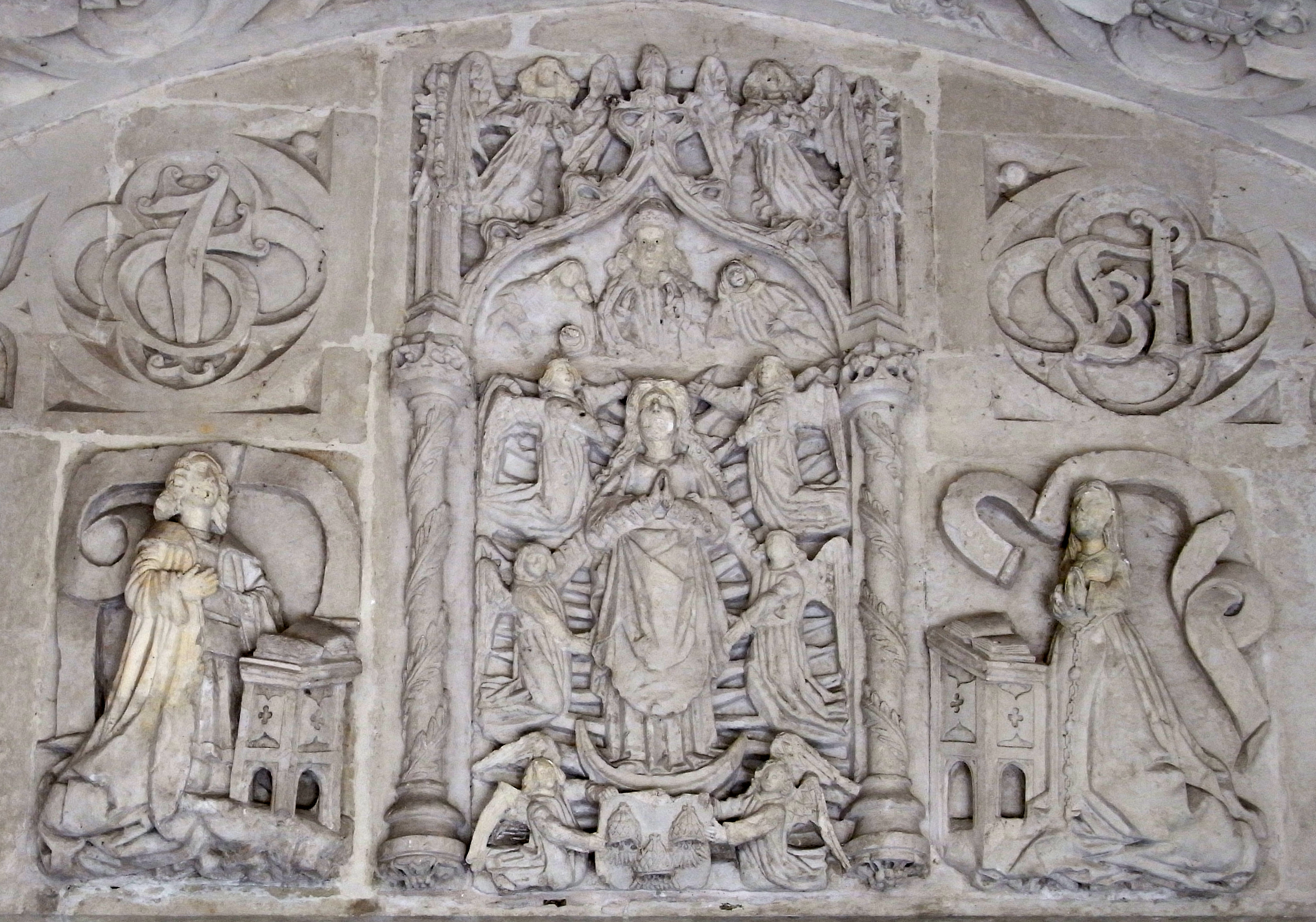
Relief sculpture in the 1517 Greenway Porch, St Peter's Church, Tiverton, showing the Apotheosis of the Virgin with the pre-Reformation arms and supporters of the Drapers Company, below

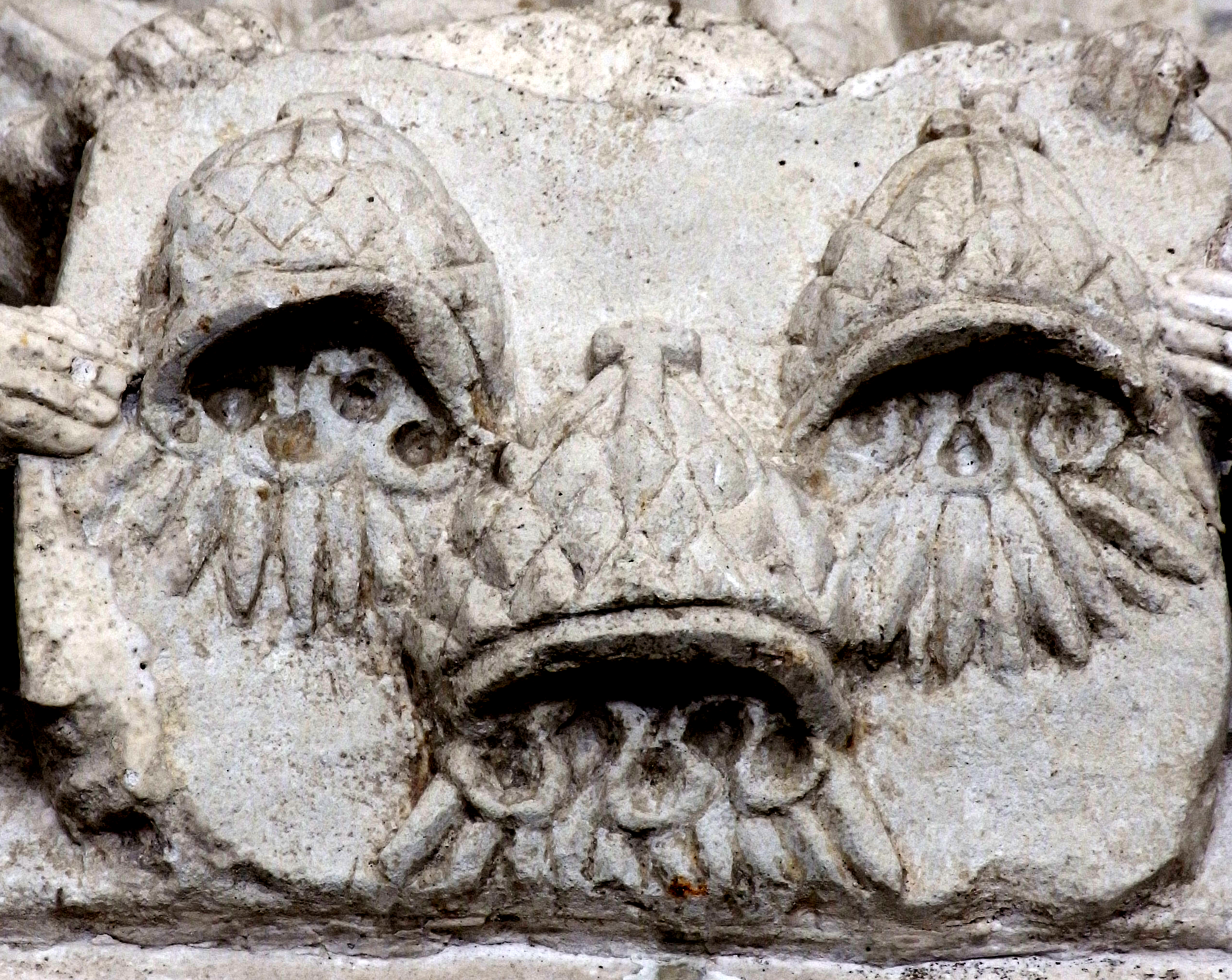
Drapers Company arms, 1517 sculpture, Greenway Porch, St Peter's Church, Tiverton. The clouds are represented by heraldic lines nebulée

An elaborate pre-Reformation relief stonework sculpture, showing the Drapers Company arms in a relevant context, survives in the Greenway Porch, built in 1517 against the south wall of St Peter's Church in Tiverton, Devon, by the wealthy merchant John Greenway (d.1529), a member of the Drapers Company and of the Merchant Adventurers Company. It shows Greenway (left, with monogram "JG" in a quatrefoil above) and his wife kneeling on either side of the Virgin Mary who is ascending into Heaven. Below the Virgin is an heraldic escutcheon showing the arms of the Drapers Company (Azure, three clouds radiated proper each adorned with a triple crown or), with the very rarely surviving pre-Reformation angel supporters, the Virgin being the patroness of the Drapers Company.

== 1561 amendments ==
In 1561, two decades after the Reformation, the arms were inspected and confirmed by William Harvey, Clarenceux King of Arms. A new crest was granted of A golden ram, and the angel supporters were replaced by Two lions or pelletée.

== 1613 amendments ==
In 1613 the Imperial crowns were modified in shape and a motto was granted, namely: "Unto God only be Honour and Glory". The new grant was made on 6 June 1613 by Garter King of Arms Sir William Segar, with blazon as follows:

Azure, upon three clouds proper the sunbeams issuing three imperial triple crowns gold ("On a blue background, three clouds of natural colour from which are shining down sunbeams, each surmounted at the top with an Imperial triple-tiered gold crown")

The supporters are Two lions or pelletée ("Two gold lions covered with black roundels"). The crest is blazoned: On a wreath of their colours a mount vert thereon a ram jacent fleeced gold armed and unguled sable ("On a braided wreath of blue and gold cord stands a green hill on top of which lies gold ram with head raised and with black horns and hooves"). The mantle (cloth covering the helmet) is blazoned: Gules, doubled argent ("red lined with white")

== Symbolism ==
A number of explanations of the symbolism of the Drapers' arms have been postulated. The Company's patron is the Virgin Mary, and each of the grants of arms is clear that this is to whom the triple crowns refer. Mary was deemed to be an empress and the symbol for an emperor/empress is a triple crown. An image of The Virgin Mary wearing the same tiara is in the margin of the Letters Patent granting the Arms to the Company. The Drapers were originally a religious fraternity associated with the Church of St Mary Bethlehem Church, Bishopsgate.

However, as the Pope has long used (until 1963) the "Papal Tiara" or triple crown, as a symbol of his temporal and spiritual power, the symbol used in the Drapers' arms may have become politically tainted at the time of the Reformation when England declared independence from papal authority. This may explain the clarifications which were required in the 16th and 17th century grants.

The symbolism is most likely to represent The Assumption of the Virgin; in the margins of the Letters Patent of the Grant, Mary is being crowned by angels. It has been suggested that the arms demonstrate that from Mary, through the Holy Spirit, comes the divine Son of God: thus the sunbeams represent the brilliance and light of the Virgin Mary, and the cloud which is a frequent symbol for the Holy Spirit. Another suggestion is that the crowned clouds are mistaken renderings of pyx-canopies, that is veils (as would be sold by drapers) hanging from pyxes.

The triple repetition of this main charge follows standard heraldic usage for charges of all kinds, but here also serves to emphasise the Trinity.

== Motto ==
The motto is: Unto God only be Honour and Glory, from 1 Timothy 1:17.
