= Worshipful Company of Drapers =

City of London guild

Coordinates: 51.51506°N 0.08654°W

The Drapers' Company
- Motto: Unto God Only be Honour and Glory
- Location: Drapers' Hall, Throgmorton Avenue, London EC2
- Date of formation: 1361; 665 years ago
- Order of precedence: 3rd
- Master of company: Patrick Beddows TD
- Website: www.thedrapers.co.uk

The Worshipful Company of Drapers is one of the 114 livery companies of the City of London, formally styled The Master and Wardens and Brethren and Sisters of the Guild or Fraternity of the Blessed Mary the Virgin of the Mystery of Drapers of the City of London.

More usually known simply as The Drapers' Company, it is one of the historic Great Twelve Livery Companies and was founded during the Middle Ages.

== History ==
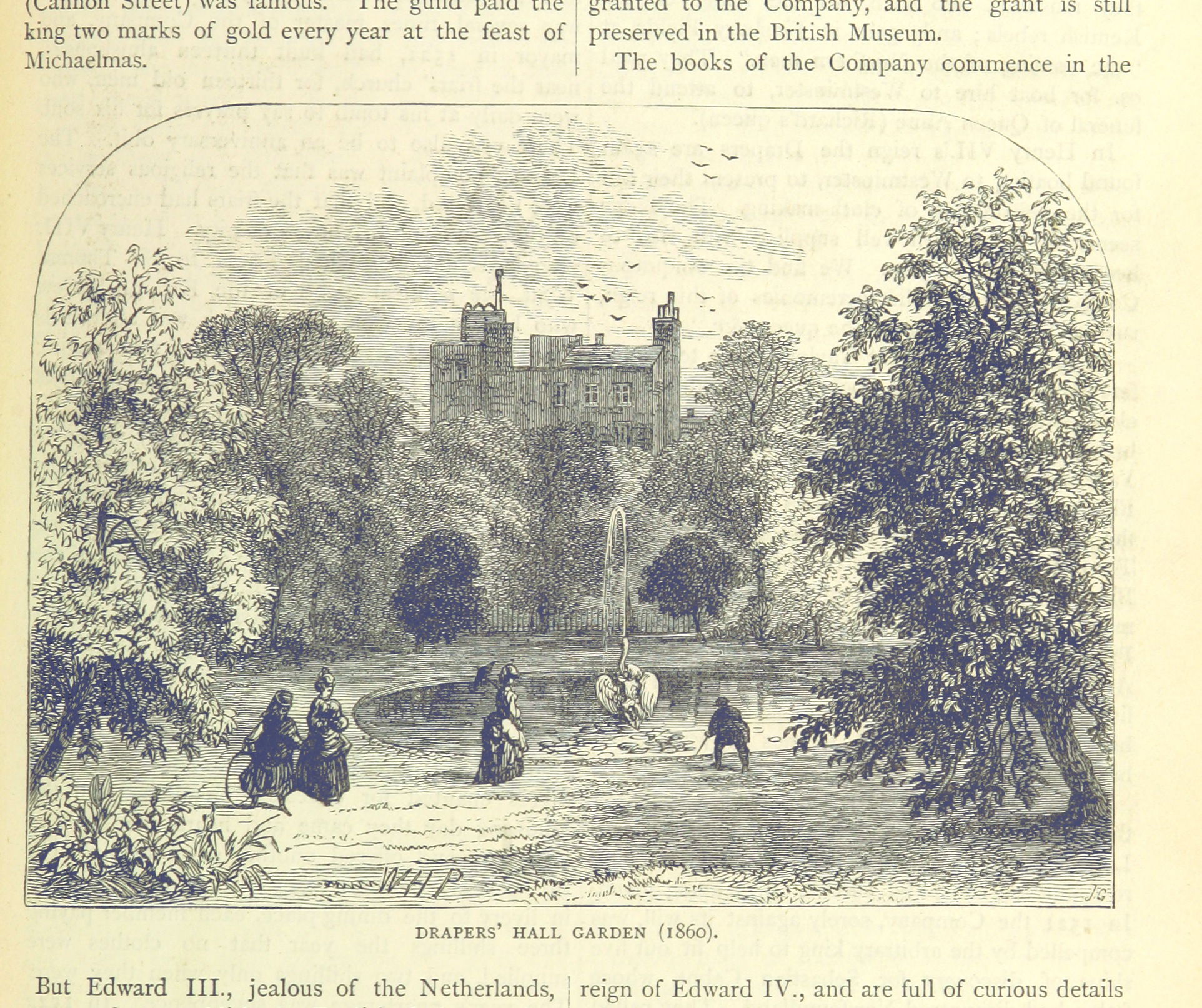
Drapers' Hall Garden, 1860

An informal association of drapers had organized as early as 1180, and the first (Lord) Mayor of London in 1189, Henry Fitz-Ailwin de Londonestone, was believed to have been a Draper. The guild was formally founded in 1361; it received a Royal Charter three years later. It was incorporated as a company under a Royal Charter in 1438 and was the first corporate body to be granted a coat of arms. The charter gave the company perpetual succession and a common seal. Over the centuries the original privileges granted by Royal Charter have been confirmed and amended by successive monarchs. The acting charter of today is that granted by James I in 1607, amended by four supplemental charters, most recently in 2008.

The brotherhood of drapers, a religious fraternity attached to the Church of St Mary Bethlehem in Bishopsgate, was founded in honour of the Virgin Mary by "good people Drapers of Cornhill and other good men and women" for the amendment of their lives. The majority of drapers lived in and around Cornhill, Candlewick Street (now Cannon Street) and Chepe (Cheapside). Possibly it was for this reason that their allegiance was transferred to St Mary-le-Bow in Cheapside and later to St Michael, Cornhill, where the Company continues to worship today. Despite these changes, the Drapers retain the Blessed Virgin Mary as their patron saint.

Originally, the organisation was a trade association of wool and cloth merchants. It has been one of the most powerful companies in London civic life. Over one hundred Lord Mayors have been members of the Company; the first, Henry Fitz-Ailwyn, progenitor of the earls of Arundel, was a draper. During the Plantation of Ulster, the Company held land around Moneymore and Draperstown in County Londonderry.

Among royalty who have been Drapers, three had not been expected to accede as a monarch at the time of their admission to the Company but were later crowned:

- Prince William of Orange in 1670, later King William (III & II) of England, Scotland, France and Ireland
- Prince Carl of Denmark in 1896, later King Haakon VII of Norway
- Prince Albert, Duke of York, in 1919, later George VI, King of Great Britain and Ireland, Emperor of India

Other well known members have included Prince Frederick, Duke of York and Albany (aka the Grand Old Duke of York), Sir Francis Drake, Admiral the Viscount Nelson, the Marquess of Ripon and Grinling Gibbons.

Queen Elizabeth II of the United Kingdom (elected to the Court of Assistants in 2017 on the occasion of the 70th anniversary of her admission to the Company), King Harald V of Norway, King Charles III, the Duchess of Gloucester, Admiral the Lord Boyce, and Lady Victoria Leatham (elected as the first female Master of the Company in 2012) are among the many distinguished recent members of the Company.

Professor Morag Shiach serves as Master Draper for 2024/25.

== Present ==
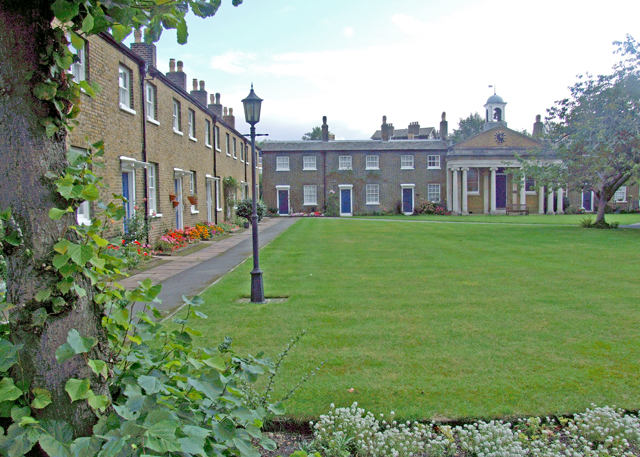
Queen Elizabeth's College, Greenwich (almshouses)

Today, the Company operates as a charitable, ceremonial and educational institution. This has included providing the site and some of the buildings of Queen Mary University of London, the library at Bangor University, the Radcliffe Science Library and Townsend Building in Oxford, the Science Library at Cardiff University, and the site and the original nineteenth-century buildings of Bancroft's School. It also administers three almshouses: Queen Elizabeth College Greenwich, Edmanson's Close Tottenham and Walter's Close Southwark. It provides the chairman and four other governors of Bancroft's School, which displays the Drapers' coat of arms and motto. It is the co-sponsor of Drapers' Academy in Harold Hill, which uses a similar heraldic logo.

The Drapers' Company maintains long-standing close ties with Kirkham Grammar School near Preston, Lancashire, founded in Tudor times. The Company also founded two girls' schools: in Llandaff and Denbigh, Wales, using the endowment of Welsh merchant Thomas Howell, who bequeathed a sum of money to the foundation. Both schools were independent and separate institutions but the Company still has a representative in the governing body of the former. The Company also has close links with some eighteen other educational establishments, ranging from Oxbridge colleges to a primary school. It administers charitable trusts relating to relief of need, education and almshouses; it provides banqueting and catering services; and it fosters its heritage and traditions of good fellowship. The Court of Assistants is its governing body.

The Drapers' Company continues to play a role in the life of the City. Its liverymen carry out important functions in the elections and governance of the City of London and its civic offices.

== Livery hall ==
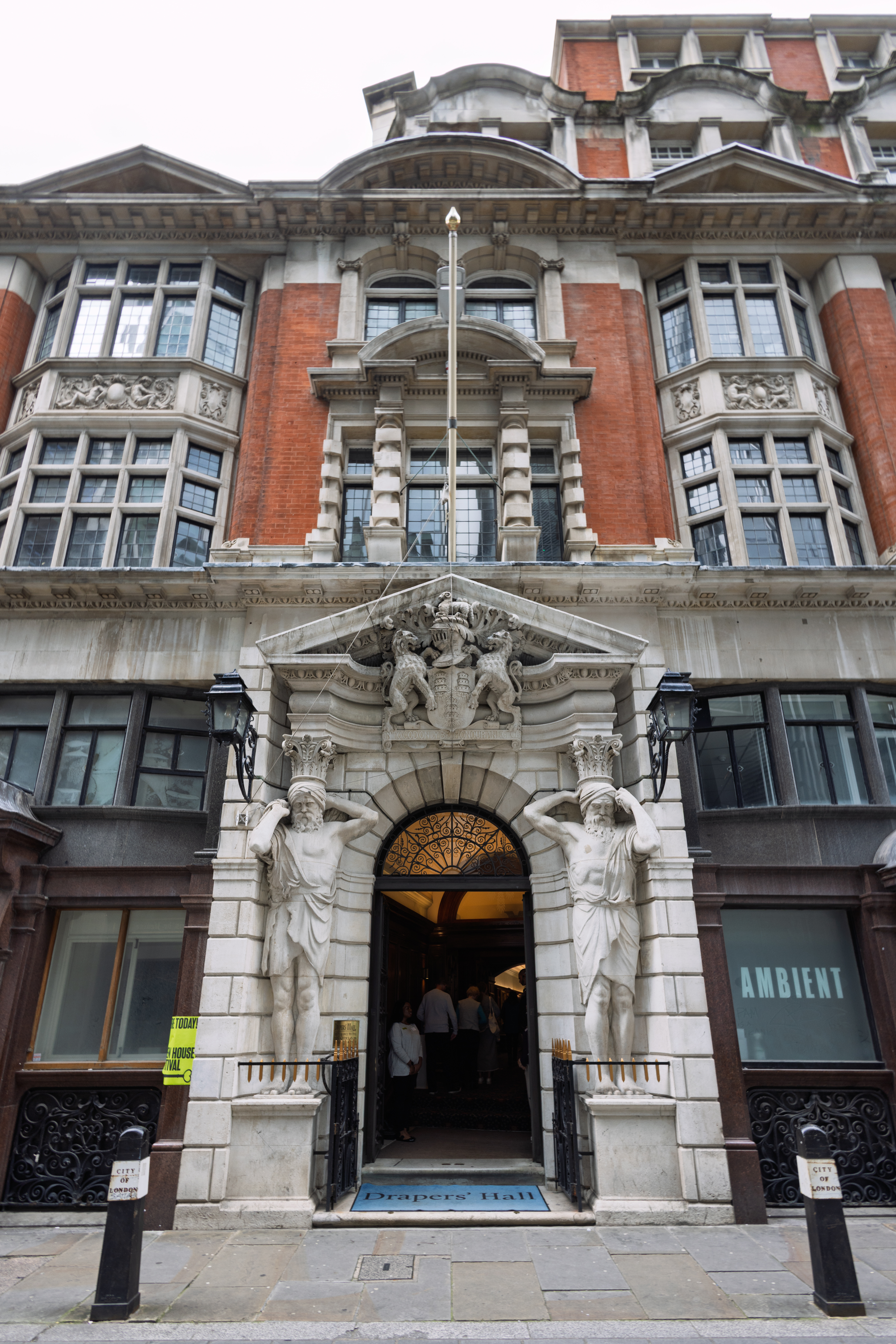
Entrance to Drapers' Hall on Throgmorton Street

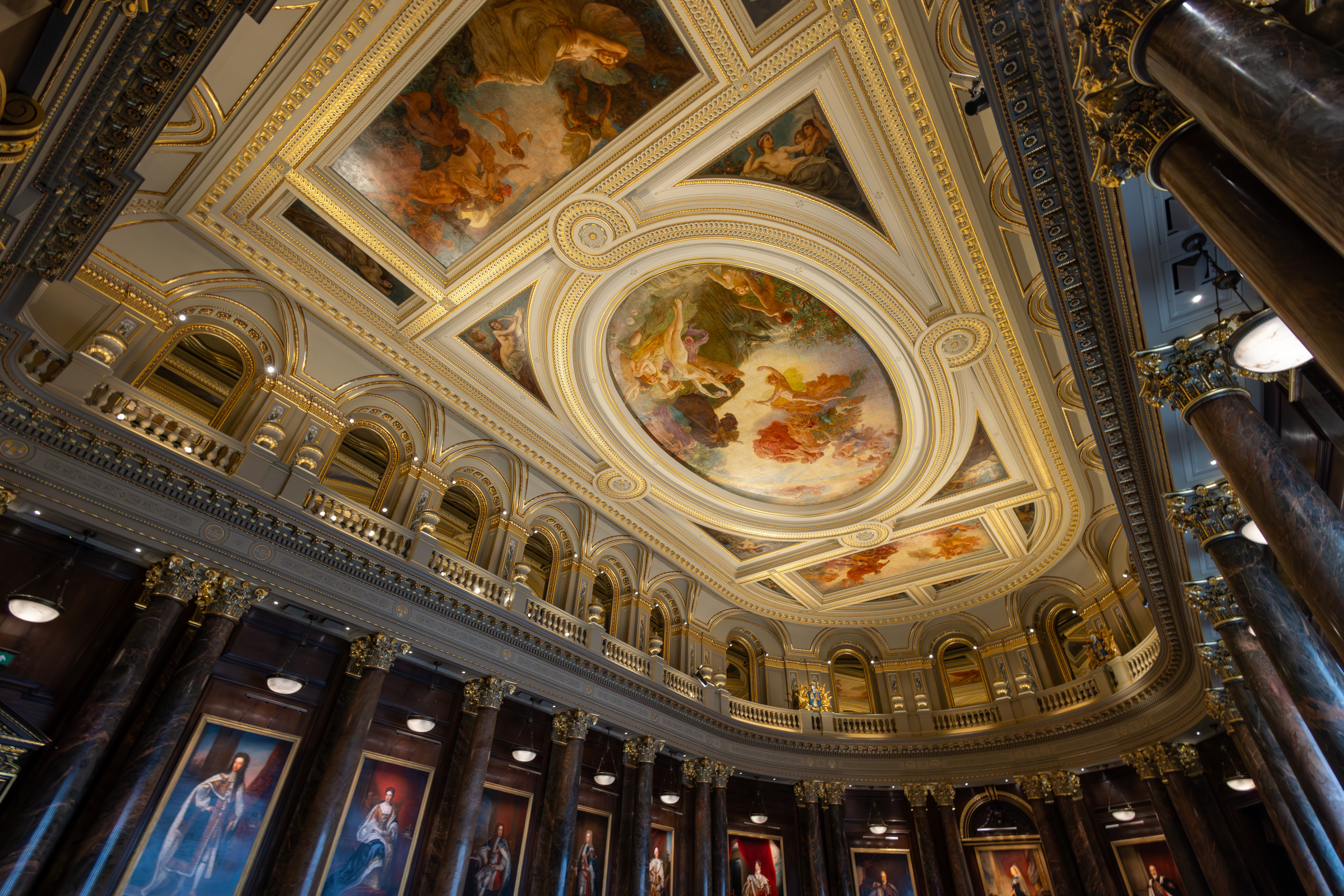
The Livery Hall of Drapers' Hall

The Drapers' Company is based at Drapers' Hall located in Throgmorton Street, near London Wall. The Company has owned the site since 1543, when it purchased the London townhouse of Thomas Cromwell, of Austin Friars, from King Henry VIII. Cromwell had been attainted and executed in 1540.

The building was destroyed in the Great Fire of London and rebuilt to designs by Edward Jarman. After another fire in 1772, it was rebuilt again. This time the architect was John Gorham. Further extensive alterations were made in the 19th century. The Hall survived the Blitz during the Second World War.

The Hall includes four finely decorated main rooms used for the Company's functions. The largest room is the Livery Hall, which can accommodate up to 276 guests for dinner. These rooms are also available for hire and have often been used for film locations, including for The King's Speech, GoldenEye, The Lost Prince and Agent Cody Banks 2: Destination London. Groups may book a guided tour of Drapers' Hall; a donation to the company's charitable work is requested. The main rooms in the Hall are usually also open once a year as part of Open House London.

== Guild Church ==
- St Michael's Cornhill

== Collections ==
The Drapers' Company archives, works of art, silver and artefacts are in the care of its archivist. The document collection has items dating to the 13th century, including charters and coats of arms, charity records and records of the Company's landholdings, including the Londonderry estates. The silver collection includes an ancient Celtic decorative collar found on the Londonderry estate and pieces of the company's own silverware from the 16th century onwards. There is also a collection of paintings, mostly of former members. Researchers may view its collections by appointment.

== See also ==
- Coat of arms of the Drapers' Company
- Drapers' Gardens, London EC2
- Sukiennice, or Drapers' Hall, Renaissance landmark in Kraków, Poland
