= Robert Thorne (merchant) =

British merchant who promoted exploration voyages in the 1520s

Robert Thorne the younger
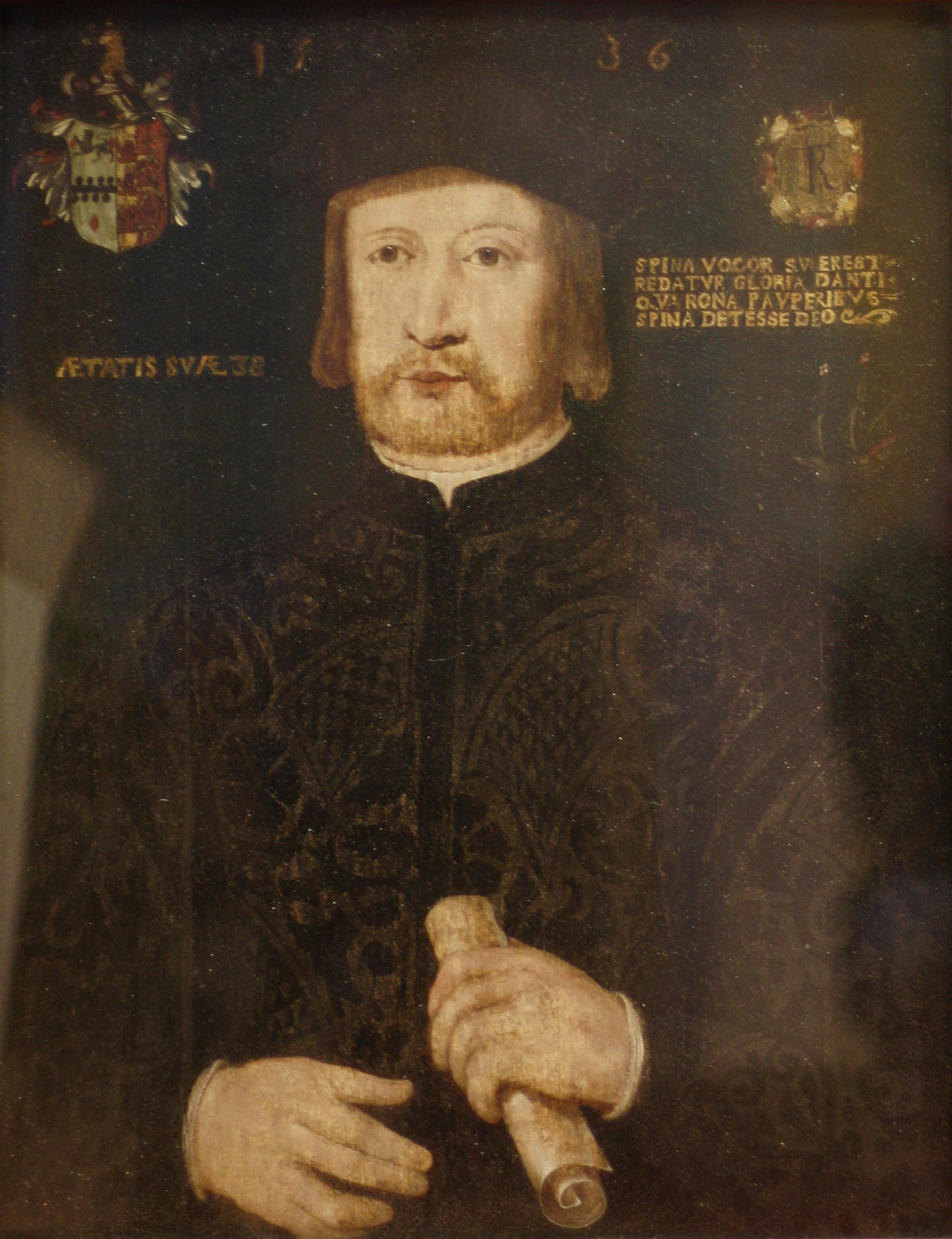
- Portrait of Robert Thorne in Bristol Grammar School. A 1624 copy of the original, now lost.
- Born: 1492; Bristol, England
- Died: 1532 (aged 39–40); London
- Occupation: Merchant
- Known for: Atlantic exploration, founding of Bristol Grammar School
- Partner: Anna Garcia
- Children: Vincent (b. c.1525)
- Parent(s): Robert Thorne the elder (d.1519), Johane Withypoll (d. 1523)
- Relatives: Nicholas Thorne (brother), Elyn, Catherin, Alice (sisters)

Robert Thorne the younger (1492-1532) was a sixteenth-century Bristol merchant. He is best known for both promoting exploration voyages in the 1520s and for co-founding Bristol Grammar School, along with his brother Nicholas Thorne.

== Early life ==
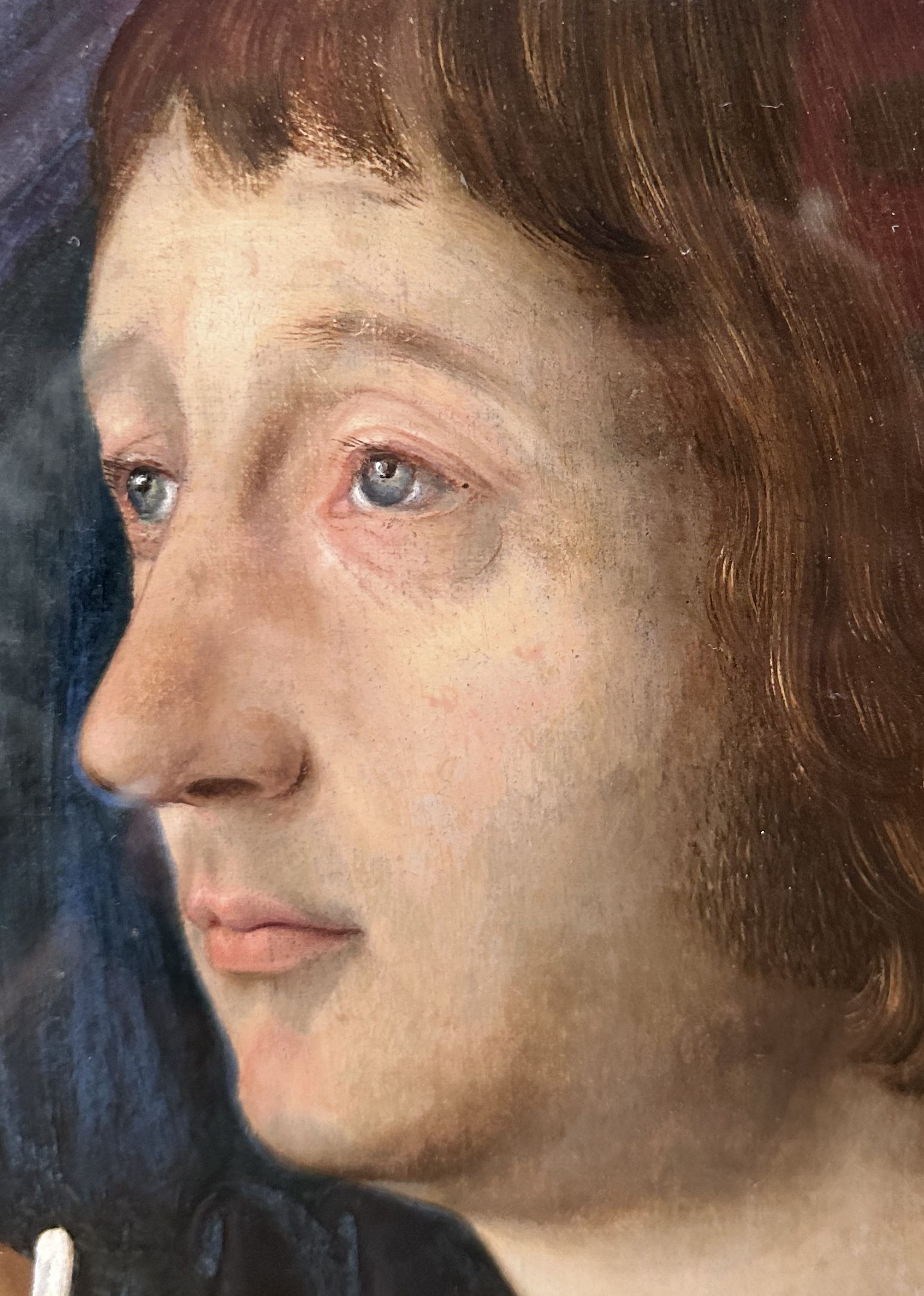
Paul Withypoll, Thorne's master (1514)

Thorne was born in 1492, the eldest son of the Bristol merchant and explorer, Robert Thorne the elder and Johane Withypoll, who came from another wealthy merchant family. He was apprenticed to his cousin, Paul Withypoll a Merchant Taylor of London who traded extensively to Spain. For merchants, apprenticeships typically began around the age of 13-16, following formal schooling, with the apprenticeship lasting a minimum of 7 years. The later years of an apprenticeship might include substantial periods spent abroad, accompanying trading voyages or living in foreign cities, buying and selling goods for their master and others on commission. Given Thorne's residence in Seville from at least the 1520s, it is likely that he was based in Andalusia during at least part of his apprenticeship.

Thorne would have completed his apprenticeship aged about 21 (1513) and could then have been made a Freeman of London on this basis, giving him the right to trade independently and vote in council elections. It has sometimes been claimed that he was the Robert Thorne who served as Mayor of Bristol in 1514-15, notwithstanding that he would only have been 22 at the time. The Bristol mayor was actually his father, Robert Thorne the elder (c.1460-1519) who was a longstanding Bristol merchant, a town councillor and a former sheriff. The elder Robert was described as an alderman, in 1518, which was a post reserved for former mayors. Robert Thorne the elder was also identified as a former mayor of Bristol on his 1519 tomb.

== Career ==
By 1521 Thorne was well established in Seville, part owning two soap factories there. When he sold his share of the Reale Almonas soap factor in Seville in 1531, the deal included seventeen enslaved workers. Thorne had business interests throughout Spain, as well as with numerous English merchants, such as Thomas Malliard and his old master, Paul Withypoll. During the 1520s, Thorne traded with London but also with his brother and business partner in Bristol, Nicholas Thorne. Robert Thorne represented Bristol as M.P. for Bristol in the 1523 Parliament.

By 1526 Thorne was the leading English merchant in Andalusia, trading directly to Spain's colonies in the New World, especially Santo Domingo in Hispaniola, where he had an English agent, Thomas Tizon.

== Promotion of exploration ==
Thorne is best known for his promotion of maritime exploration during the 1520s, both from Spain and England. In December 1524, Thorne invested in a voyage being prepared from Spain by Sebastian Cabot to search for a route to the Spice Islands by sailing around South America.

On 15 April 1526 Dr Edward Lee, English ambassador in Spain wrote to Thomas Wolsey, Henry VIII's chief minister that 'The Emperor has spoken to two merchants: the one called Briges, the alderman's brother; the other, "a right toward young man as any lightly belongeth to England, called Thorne." They are here of great credence.'

In 1527 Thorne presented a tract to Dr Lee accompanied by an address to Henry VIII. Both were published by Richard Hakluyt in 1582.

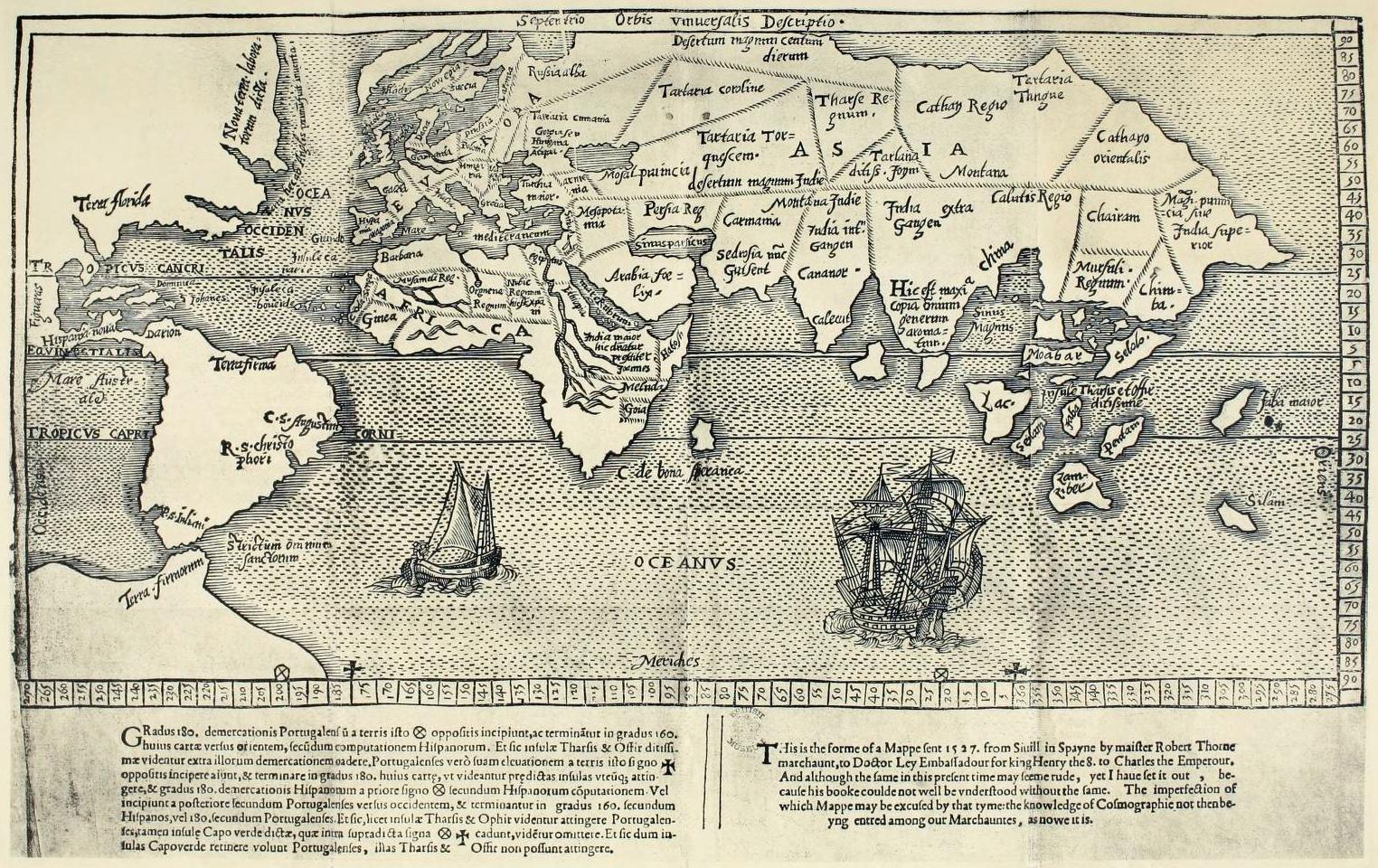
Thorne's 1527 world map

Thorne claimed that he had inherited his passion for exploration from his father, Robert Thorne the elder, who he said, along with Hugh Eliot of Bristol was one of the English 'discoverers of the Newfound Landes'. He proposed that the Orient could be reached via a near-polar northwest passage around North America. He also included a world map to illustrate his case.

In 1531 Thorne bought a 250-ton Bristol ship in Andalusia called the Saviour and sent it back to Bristol, intending to build at fleet around it ‘to discover and sougyt new contrys’. Following Thorne's death in 1532 the ship transferred to his brother, Nicholas, who instead used it for trading to the Levant.

== Death and bequests ==
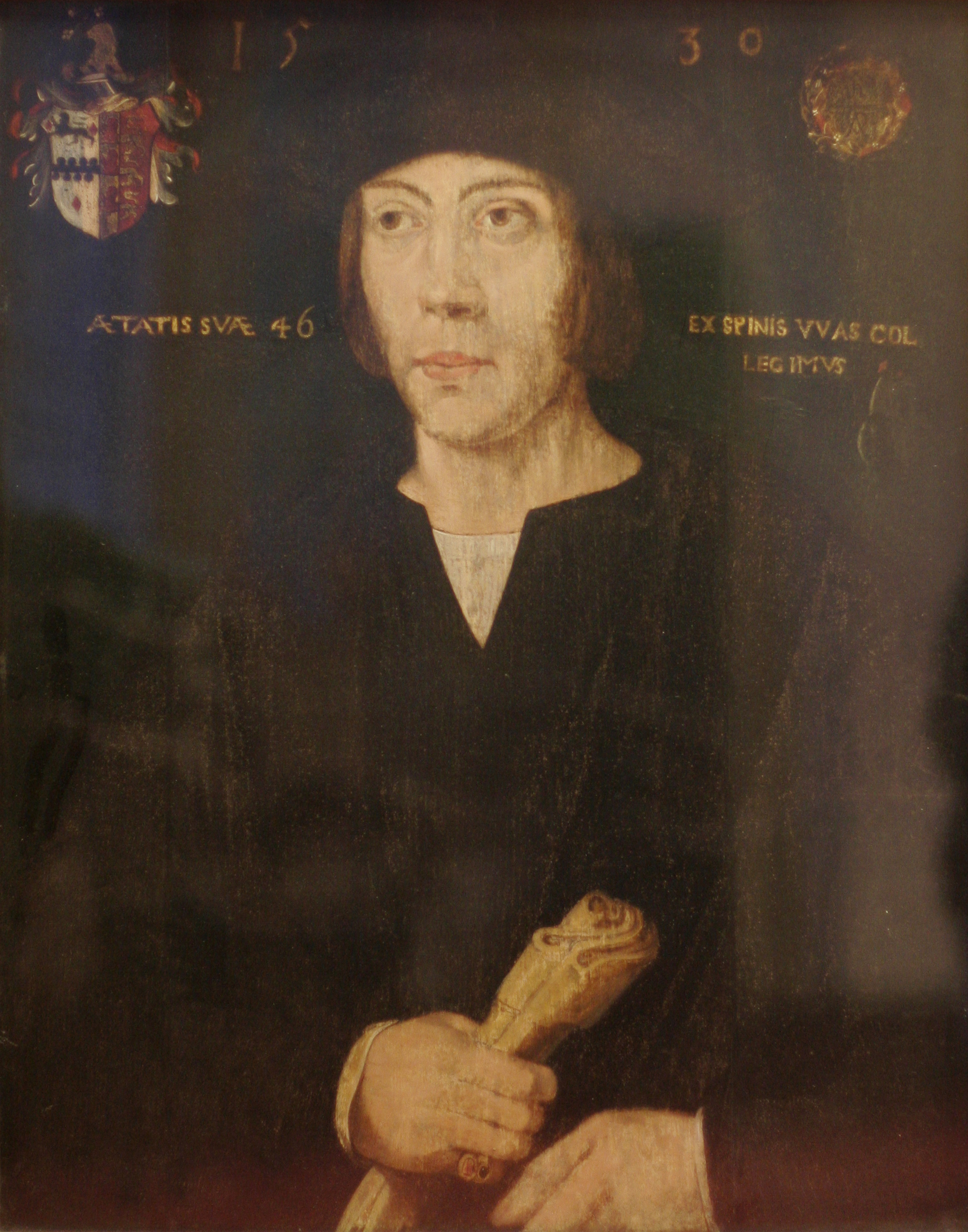
Portrait of Nicholas Thorne, Bristol Grammar School

In 1531 Thorne returned to England. On 31 January 1532 took out an indenture to transfer an existing Bristol school into his hands, along with those of his brother, Nicholas, and John Gooderiche. In return he undertook to make a school house for a free grammar school. This school would become Bristol Grammar School. It received a royal charter from Henry VIII on 17 March 1532. The school was located in St Bartholomew's Hospital, at the bottom of Christmas Steps. Thorne, along with his brother, Nicholas, are regarded as founders of the school, with the school's motto Ex Spinis Uvas (Grapes from Thorns) being a play on their surname.

Robert Thorne died in 1532 in London. John Stow's 'Survey of London' records him as one of the city's worthies for his charitable bequests:

Robert Thorne Merchant Taylor, deceased a bachelor, in the year 1532 gave by his Testament to charitable actions, more than £4440 and legacies to his poor kindred more £5142 besides his debts forgiven, &c.

Thorne's bequests in his will of 17 May 1532 included 'towards the making of the free schole of Saint Bartholomews in Bristowe £300 sterling' His will was proved on 10 October. Although Thorne was unmarried, he had an illegitimate son, Vincent, in Spain, with his mistress Anna Garcia. He left Vincent £3000 with instructions that he be put into care of the Cattanei family, with whom he had long done business. Anna was left £50 on the condition that she renounce all claims on his estate. An inventory of his goods taken after his death assessed his goods at £2,623, including £94 for 'a house and slaves in Sevyle'.

The Elizabethan geographer and historian, Richard Hakluyt, described Thorne as 'a notable member and ornament of his country, as wel for his learning, as great charity to the poore'. The seventeenth-century antiquary, Thomas Fuller, said of him:

I confesse, Thorns came in by "man’s curse" and our Saviour saith, “Do men gather Grapes of Thorns?" But this our Thorn (God send us many Copices of them) was a Blessing to our Nation, and Wine and Oil may be said freely to flow from him.

Fuller's comment appears to be the origin of to Bristol Grammar School's motto 'Grapes from Thorns', formally adopted in 1909.

Thorne was buried in St. Christopher le Stocks (London) in 'a very fair tomb of pure touch, in the south side of the choir'. The description of the placement of the tomb in the chancel of the church, and the accompanying epitaph, were published in 1720 in a revised version of Stow's 'Survey of London'. 'Touch' was a black continental marble. The surviving painting of Robert Thorne now hanging in Bristol Grammar School, along with a similar one of his brother, Nicholas, are both copies produced in 1624 from originals borrowed from a Wiltshire family.
