= Drumcrow =

- townland

Irish transcription(s)
  - Derivation: Droim Cró
  - Meaning: "Bloody ridge"
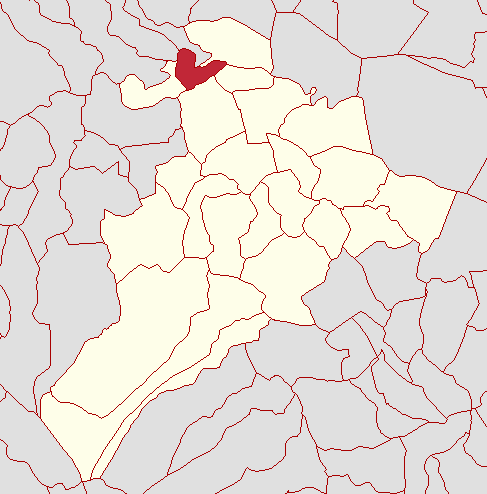

- Drumcrow shown within Northern Ireland Drumcrow (the United Kingdom)
- Coordinates: 54°49′12″N 6°43′41″W
- Sovereign state: United Kingdom
- Country: Northern Ireland
- County: County Londonderry
- Barony: Loughinsholin
- Civil parish: Kilcronaghan
- Plantation grant: Vintners Company
- First recorded: 1613

Government
  - Council: Mid Ulster District
  - Ward: Tobermore

Area
  - Total: 109.0 acres (44.13 ha)
- Irish grid ref: H818977

Drumcrow (locally [ˌdrömˈkroː], from Irish Droim Cró 'bloody ridge') is a townland lying within the civil parish of Kilcronaghan, County Londonderry, Northern Ireland. It lies in the north of the parish with the Moyola River running along its northern boundary. It is bounded by the townlands of; Drumballyhagan, Drumballyhagan Clark, Drumconready, Kirley Lisnamuck, Moneyshanere, and Moybeg Kirley. It was apportioned to the Vintners company.

The townland was part of Tobermore electoral ward of the former Magherafelt District Council, however in 1926 it was part of Tobermore district electoral division as part of the Maghera division of Magherafelt Rural District. It was also part of the historic barony of Loughinsholin.

== Etymology ==
Drumcrow is suggested to derive its name from the Irish Droim Cró, meaning "bloody ridge". This is based upon the context of earlier forms of the name, which suggested the use of the noun cró, which means "blood, gore". An early Irish poem makes mention of a Droim Cró (now Drumcree) in County Westmeath, which was the site of a battle with the editor remarking that the final element of the name meant "blood, gore". Ridges where an ideal defence-attack position, where the defender could rain missiles upon an enemy that had to climb uphill, and quickly take up an offensive position with a downhill charge.

== History ==
Population
Year	Pop.
1841	37
1851	33
1861	45
1871	39
1881	30
1891	26
1901	23
1911	25
1926	16

Size (acres, roods, poles)
Year	a, r, p
1851	108, 0, 23
1881	108, 0, 23
1901	108, 0, 23
1926	110, 2, 5

Earlier recorded forms
Year	Form
1613	Drum Crowor
1622	Drom Crow
1654	Drumcrow
1659c	Drumcrow
1661	Half Dromcrow
1663	Drumero
1813	Half Drumcro

== See also ==
- Kilcronaghan
- List of townlands in Tobermore
- Tobermore
