= Kirley =

Townland in County Londonderry, Northern Ireland

Kirley is a townland lying within the civil parish of Maghera, County Londonderry, Northern Ireland. It lies on the western boundary of the parish beside that of Ballynascreen, with the Moyola River flowing through its southern boundary. It is bounded by the townlands of; Bracaghreilly, Coolnasillagh, Drumconready, Drumcrow, Glenshane, Lisnamuck, and Moybeg Kirley. It was apportioned to the Drapers company.

The townland in 1926 was part of Carnamoney district electoral division as part of the Draperstown dispensary (registrar's) district of Magherafelt Rural District. Kirley as part of Maghera civil parish also lies in the historic barony of Loughinsholin.

== See also ==
- Maghera
