= Drumballyhagan =

- townland

Irish transcription(s)
  - Derivation: Droim Bhaile Uí Ágáin
  - Meaning: "Ridge of O'Hagan's townland"
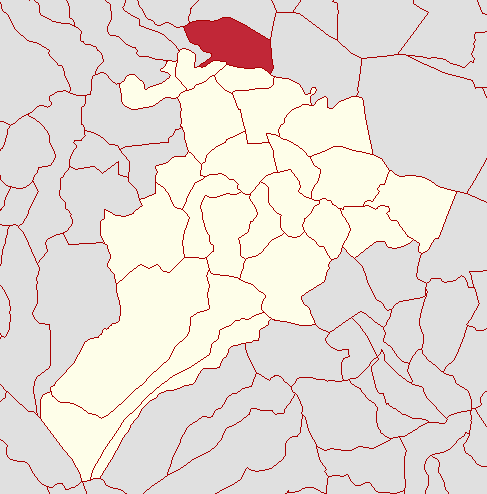

- Drumballyhagan shown within Northern Ireland Drumballyhagan (the United Kingdom)
- Coordinates: 54°49′26″N 6°42′50″W
- Sovereign state: United Kingdom
- Country: Northern Ireland
- County: County Londonderry
- Barony: Loughinsholin
- Civil parish: Kilcronaghan
- Plantation grant: Vintners Company
- First recorded: 1609

Government
  - Council: Mid Ulster District
  - Ward: Tobermore

Area
  - Total: 320.6 acres (129.73 ha)
- Irish grid ref: H827981

Drumballyhagan and Drumballyhagan Clark (locally [ˌdrӧmˌbaliˈhaɡən], from Irish Droim Bhaile Uí Ágáin 'ridge of O'Hagans townland') are two townlands lying within the civil parish of Kilcronaghan, County Londonderry, Northern Ireland. Situated in the north of the parish, the two townlands are separated by the Moyola River, of which the southern portion was held by a person surnamed "Clark". Together they are bounded by the townlands of; Ballynahone Beg, Bracaghreilly, Drumcrow, Fallagloon, Lisnamuck, Moneyshanere, and Tobermore. It was apportioned to the Vintners company.

Drumballyhagan Clarke
- townland
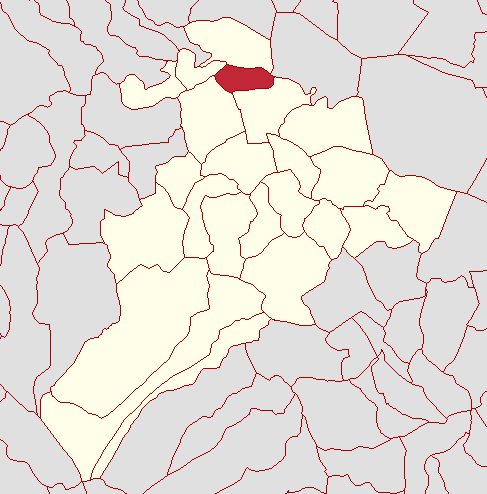

- Drumballyhagan Clarke shown within Northern Ireland Drumballyhagan Clarke (the United Kingdom)
- Sovereign state: United Kingdom
- Country: Northern Ireland

Area
  - Total: 120.9 acres (48.94 ha)
- Irish grid ref: H8297

The townland was part of Tobermore electoral ward of the former Magherafelt District Council, however in 1926 it was part of Tobermore district electoral division as part of the Maghera division of Magherafelt Rural District. It was also part of the historic barony of Loughinsholin.

== Etymology ==
This townland derives its name from the O'Hagan's, one of the principal Irish families in the barony of Loughinsholin. They occupied a castle in the nearby townland of Calmore and the surname was common in the neighbouring parishes of Desertmartin and Ballynascreen.

== History ==
Table legend

- (D) - Drumballyhagan
- (DC) - Drumballyhagan Clarke

Population
Year	Pop. (D)	Pop. (DC)
1841	168	41
1851	84	26
1861	88	28
1871	77	19
1881	51	31
1891	77	60
1901	29	22
1911	39	19
1926	46	15

Size (acres, roods, poles)
Year	a, r, p (D)	a, r, p (DC)
1851	320, 3, 4	117, 1, 34
1881	320, 3, 4	117, 1, 34
1901	320, 3, 4	117, 1, 34
1926	318, 1, 8	119, 3, 37

Earlier recorded forms
Year	Form
1609	Dromballiagan (E.C.)
1613	Balle Hagan
1613	Dromballyagan (Charter)
1654	Drombellihaggon
1654	Drumbellihaggan
1659c	Drumballyhagan
1663	Drumbolehagan
1767	Drumballyhagan
_{(E.C.) - Escheated Counties Map 1609 (Charter) - Charter of Londonderry 1613}

== See also ==
- Kilcronaghan
- List of townlands in Tobermore
- Tobermore
