= Culnady (townland) =

Townland in Northern Ireland

Culnady (from Irish Cuil Cnadaidhe 'nook of the sluggard') is a townland lying within the civil parish of Maghera, County Londonderry, Northern Ireland. It lies in the north-east of the parish and is bounded in the north-east by the Grillagh river. It is also bounded by the townlands of Ballymacilcurr, Crew, Curragh, Drummuck, Tirgarvil, and Tirnageeragh. It was apportioned to the Vintners company and Crown freeholds.

The townland in 1926 was part of Upperland district electoral division of Magherafelt Rural District. As part of Maghera civil parish, Culnady also lies within the historic barony of Loughinsholin.

== See also ==
- Maghera
