= Lisnamuck, Maghera civil parish =

Townland in County Londonderry, Northern Ireland

Lisnamuck is a townland lying within the civil parish of Maghera, County Londonderry, Northern Ireland. It lies south-west boundary of the parish beside that of Ballynascreen, with the Moyola River forming most of its southern boundary. It is bounded by the townlands of; Bracaghreilly, Drumballyhagan, Drumcrow, and Kirley. It was apportioned to the Drapers company as well as freeholds.

The townland in 1926 was part of Carnamoney district electoral division as part of the Draperstown dispensary (registrar's) district of Magherafelt Rural District. Lisnamuck as part of Maghera civil parish also lies in the historic barony of Loughinsholin.

== See also ==
- Maghera
