= Fallagloon =

Townland in County Londonderry, Northern Ireland

Fallagloon is a townland lying within the civil parish of Maghera, County Londonderry, Northern Ireland. It lies in the north-west boundary of the parish, and is bounded by the townlands of; Ballyknock, Ballynahone Beg, Bracaghreilly, Currudda, Drumballyhagan, Falgortrevy, Fallylea, Glenshane, and Tullyheran. It was apportioned to the Vintners company. It is known for being the longest townland in Ireland

The townland in 1926 was part of Tullykeran district electoral division as part of the Maghera dispensary (registrar's) district of Magherafelt Rural District. Fallagloon as part of Maghera civil parish also lies in the historic barony of Loughinsholin.
