= Falgortrevy =

Townland in County Londonderry, Northern Ireland

Coordinates: 54.839°N 6.691°W

Falgortrevy is a townland lying within the Civil parishes in Ireland of Maghera, County Londonderry, Northern Ireland. It lies on the western boundary of the parish and is divided into two portions; Falgortrevy (main portion) and Falgortrevy (detached portion), separated by small portions of the townlands of Craigadick and Tullyheran. The detached portion is also bounded by the townlands of Craigmore and Tirnony, whilst the main portion is also bounded by the townlands of Ballynahone Beg and Fallagloon. It wasn't apportioned to any of the London livery companies, being kept as church lands.

The townland in 1926 was part of Tullykeeran district electoral division as part of the Maghera dispensary (registrar's) district of Magherafelt Rural district. Falgortrevy as part of Maghera civil parish also lies in the historic barony of Loughinsholin.

== See also ==
- Maghera
