= Clooney, Kilcronaghan civil parish =

Clooney
- townland

Irish transcription(s)
  - Derivation: An Chluanaidh
  - Meaning: "The meadow"
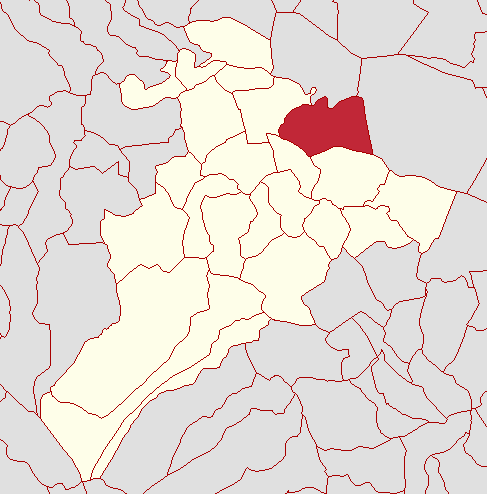

- Clooney shown within Northern Ireland Clooney (the United Kingdom)
- Coordinates: 54°48′40″N 6°41′15″W
- Sovereign state: United Kingdom
- Country: Northern Ireland
- County: County Londonderry
- Barony: Loughinsholin
- Civil parish: Kilcronaghan
- Plantation grant: Drapers Company and freeholds
- First recorded: 1609

Government
  - Council: Mid Ulster District
  - Ward: Tobermore

Area
  - Total: 398.7 acres (161.33 ha)
- Irish grid ref: H844967

Clooney (locally [ˌkloːni] and [ˌkloni], from Irish An Chluanaidh, meaning 'the meadow') is a townland lying within the civil parish of Kilcronaghan, County Londonderry, Northern Ireland. It lies in north-east of the parish and is bounded in the north by the Moyola River as well as the parish of Termoneeny. It is bounded by the following townlands; Ballynahone Beg, Ballynahone More, Gortamney, Moyesset, and Tobermore. It was apportioned to the Drapers company as well as freeholds.

The townland was part of Tobermore electoral ward of the former Magherafelt District Council, however in 1926 it was part of Tobermore district electoral division as part of the Maghera division of Magherafelt Rural District. It was also part of the historic barony of Loughinsholin.

== History ==
John O'Donovan, who worked on the Ordnance Survey if the early 19th century, recommended that the townland of Clooney be spelt as "Cloan", however his suggestion was scored out in the Ordnance Survey Name Books and replaced with "Cloney", which was based on the apparent usage of the time. At a later stage it was again revised to the modern spelling "Clooney".

The townland appears to have been originally known along the lines of Ballynecloney (from Irish Baile na Cluana, meaning 'townland of the meadow'), with variations of this spelling used in various sources from 1609 until 1657.

Population
Year	Pop.
1841	205
1851	193
1861	164
1871	125
1881	95
1891	83
1901	75
1911	79
1926	85

Size (acres, roods, poles)
Year	a, r, p
1851	413, 1, 38
1881	398, 3, 1
1901	398, 3, 1
1926	400, 1, 38

Earlier recorded forms
Year	Form
1609	B-neclouy (E.C.)
1613	Ba-ne Clon
1613	Ballmeclom (Charter)
1654	Belliclan
1657	Ballinacleny
1659c	Clone, ye ^{1}/_{2} towne of
1663	Cloane
1767	Clooney
1813	Cloan
_{(E.C.) - Escheated Counties Map 1609 (Charter) - Charter of Londonderry 1613}

== See also ==
- Kilcronaghan
- List of townlands in Tobermore
- Tobermore
