= Craigadick =

Townland in County Londonderry, Northern Ireland

Coordinates: 54°49′52″N 6°40′56″W

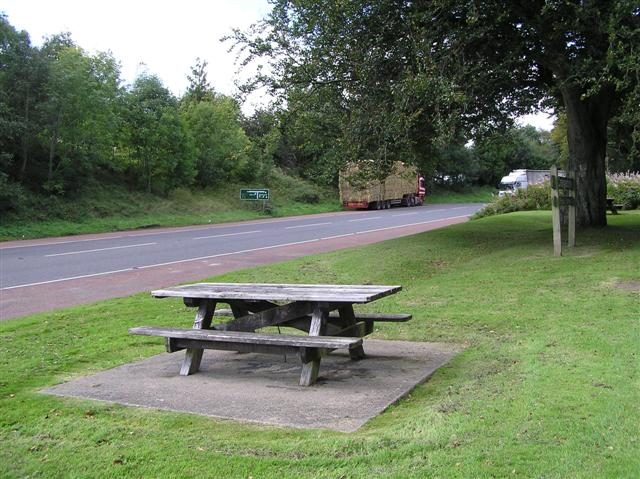
Picnic area near the A6 road in Craigadick

Craigadick is a townland lying within the civil parish of Maghera, County Londonderry, Northern Ireland. It lies in the west of the parish sharing a small boundary with Killelagh civil parish. It is bounded by the townlands of; Ballynahone Beg, Craigmore, Falgortrevy, Largantogher, Moneymore, Mullagh, Tamnymullan, and Tullyheran. It wasn't apportioned to any of the London livery companies, being kept as church lands.

The townland in 1926 was part of Maghera district electoral division as part of the Maghera dispensary (registrar's) district of Magherafelt Rural District. As part of Maghera civil parish, Craigadick also lies within the former barony of Loughinsholin.

== See also ==
- Maghera
