= Ballynacross, Maghera civil parish =

Coordinates: 54°49′25″N 6°36′58″W

Ballynacross
- Townland
- Location within Northern Ireland
- County: County Londonderry
- Country: Northern Ireland
- Sovereign state: United Kingdom
- Police: Northern Ireland
- Fire: Northern Ireland
- Ambulance: Northern Ireland

Ballynacross is a townland in the civil parish of Maghera, County Londonderry, Northern Ireland. It lies in the south of the parish on the north boundary of the civil parish of Termoneeny, and is bounded by the townlands of Cabragh, Carricknakielt, Derganagh, Gulladuff, and Slaghtybogy. It was apportioned to the Vintners company.

In 1926, the townland was part of Gulladuff district electoral division as part of Magherafelt Rural District. As part of Maghera civil parish, Ballynacross also lies within the historic barony of Loughinsholin.

== See also ==
- Maghera, town
