= Ballymacilcurr =

Coordinates: 54°51′46″N 6°38′52″W

- Townland
- Location within Northern Ireland
- County: County Londonderry
- Country: Northern Ireland
- Sovereign state: United Kingdom
- Police: Northern Ireland
- Fire: Northern Ireland
- Ambulance: Northern Ireland

Ballymacilcurr is a townland lying within the civil parish of Maghera, County Londonderry, Northern Ireland. It lies in the west of the parish, and is bounded on the north by the Grillagh river. It is also bounded by the townlands of Crew, Culnady, Grillagh, Macknagh, Tamnymullan, and Tirgarvil. It was not apportioned to any of the London livery companies, being kept as churchlands.

The townland in 1926 was part of the Upperland district electoral division as part of the Maghera dispensary (registrar's) district of Magherafelt Rural District. As part of Maghera civil parish, Ballymacilcurr also lies within the historic barony of Loughinsholin.

== See also ==
- Maghera
