= Ballymacpeake Upper =

Coordinates: 54°50′10″N 6°32′48″W

- Townland
- Location within Northern Ireland
- District: County Londonderry
- Country: Northern Ireland
- Sovereign state: United Kingdom
- Police: Northern Ireland
- Fire: Northern Ireland
- Ambulance: Northern Ireland

Ballymacpeake Upper is a townland lying within the civil parish of Maghera, County Londonderry, Northern Ireland. It lies in the east of the parish on the boundaries of the civil parishes of Ballyscullion and Tamlaght O'Crilly. It is also bounded by the townlands of Ballymacombs Beg, Ballymacpeake Lower, Dreenan, Drumard, Drumlamph, Mullaghboy, and Rocktown. It was apportioned to the Vintners company.

The townland in 1926 was part of Rocktown district electoral division as part of Magherafelt Rural District. As part of Maghera civil parish, Ballymacpeake Upper also lies within the historic barony of Loughinsholin.

== See also ==
- Maghera
