= Drumconready =

Townland in County Londonderry, Northern Ireland

Coordinates: 54.828898°N 6.755853°W

Drumconready is a townland within the civil parish of Maghera, County Londonderry, Northern Ireland. It is approximately 490 acres (0.8 sq mi) in area. The townland lies on the south-west of the parish, with the Moyola River forming its southern boundary. It is bounded by the townlands of Ballynure, Coolnasillagh, Kirley, Moneyguiggy, and Moybeg Kirley. It was apportioned to the Drapers company.

The townland in 1926 was part of Carnamoney district electoral division as part of the Draperstown dispensary (registrar's) district of Magherafelt Rural District. As part of Maghera civil parish, Drumconready also lies within the historic barony of Loughinsholin.

== See also ==
- Maghera
