= Bracaghreilly =

Townland in County Londonderry, Northern Ireland

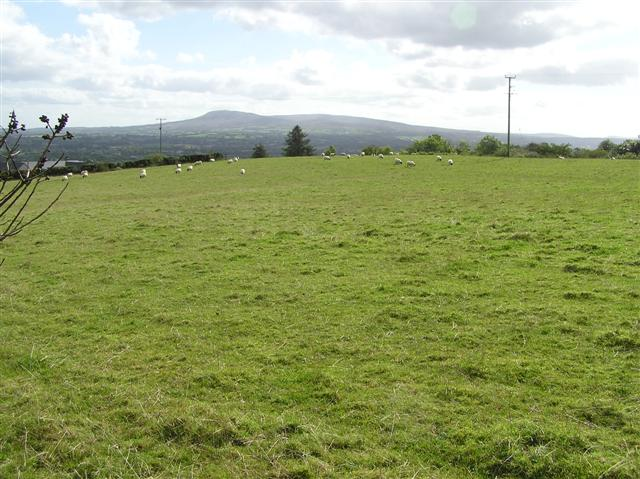
Bracaghreilly townland in 2007

Bracaghreilly is a townland lying within the civil parish of Maghera, County Londonderry, Northern Ireland. It lies on the west boundary of the parish, and is bounded by the townlands of; Drumballyhagan, Fallagloon, Glenshane, Kirley, and Lisnamuck. It was apportioned to the Drapers company.

The townland in 1926 was part of Carnamoney district electoral division as part of the Draperstown dispensary (registrar's) district of Magherafelt Rural District. As part of Maghera civil parish, Bracaghreilly also lies within the historic barony of Loughinsholin.

== See also ==
- Maghera
