= Craigmore, Maghera civil parish =

Townland in County Londonderry, Northern Ireland

Craigmore is a townland lying within the civil parish of Maghera, County Londonderry, Northern Ireland. It lies on the west boundary of the parish, and is bounded by the townlands of; Craigadick, Falgortrevy, Grillagh, Tamnymullan, and Tirnony. It wasn't apportioned to any of the London livery companies, being kept as church lands.

The townland in 1926 was part of Tullykeeran district electoral division as part of the Maghera dispensary (registrar's) district of Magherafelt Rural District. As part of Maghera civil parish, Craigmore also lies within the former barony of Loughinsholin.

== See also ==
- Maghera
