= Beagh (Spiritual) =

Townland in County Londonderry, Northern Ireland

Coordinates: 54°50′17″N 6°38′08″W

Beagh (Spiritual) is a townland lying within the civil parish of Maghera, County Londonderry, Northern Ireland. It lies in the south of the parish on the north boundary of the civil parish of Termoneeny, and is bounded by the townlands of Carricknakielt, Curragh, Maghera civil parish~Curragh, Knocknakielt, Slaghtybogy, and Tamnymartin. It wasn't apportioned to any of the London livery companies, being kept as church lands.

In 1901 and 1911 it was part of the district electoral division (D.E.D.) of Maghera within Magherafelt Rural District. In 1926 it became part of Gulladuff D.E.D. Today it is part of Maghera D.E.D. within Mid Ulster District Council.

== See also ==
- Maghera
