= Tobermore (townland) =

- townland

Irish transcription(s)
  - Derivation: An Tobar Mór
  - Meaning: "The great well"
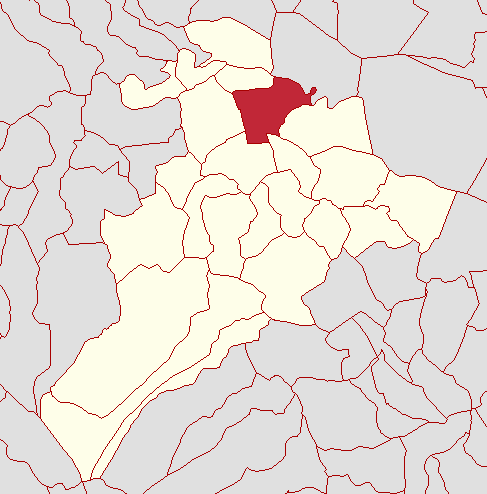

- Tobermore shown within Northern Ireland Tobermore (the United Kingdom)
- Coordinates: 54°48′50″N 6°42′14″W
- Sovereign state: United Kingdom
- Country: Northern Ireland
- County: Londonderry
- Barony: Loughinsholin
- Civil parish: Kilcronaghan
- Plantation grant: Drapers Company and freeholds
- First recorded: 1609
- Settlements: Tobermore

Government
  - Council: Mid Ulster District
  - Ward: Tobermore

Area
  - Total: 300.7 acres (121.69 ha)
- Irish grid ref: H831968

Tobermore (from Irish An Tobar Mór 'the great well') is a townland lying within the civil parish of Kilcronaghan, County Londonderry, Northern Ireland. It lies in the north-east of the parish, and is bounded by the townlands of; Ballynahone Beg, Calmore, Clooney, Drumballyhagan Clark, Moneyshanere, and Moyesset. It was apportioned to the Drapers company as well as freeholds.

The townland was part of the Tobermore electoral ward of the former Magherafelt District Council, however in 1926 it was part of Tobermore district electoral division as part of the Maghera division of Magherafelt Rural District. It was also part of the historic barony of Loughinsholin.

== History ==
The townland of Tobermore is named after an ancient well that was once sufficiently powerful to power a nearby mill, but has been dry for over a century. Fortwilliam rath and Fortwilliam House are both found in this townland. The townland of Tobermore along with four adjoining townlands formed the "Henry Estate".

The town of Tobermore lies mostly in this townland, and partially in those of Calmore, Moneyshanere, and Moyesset.

Population
| Year | Pop. |
|---|---|
| 1841 | 224 |
| 1851 | 138 |
| 1861 | 112 |
| 1871 | 67 |
| 1881 | 61 |
| 1891 | 67 |
| 1901 | 42 |
| 1911 | 342 ^{[a]} |
| 1926 | 279 ^{[b]} |
^[a] - along with townlands of Calmore and Moneyshanere, population counted as part of total for Tobermore town^[b] - includes the population of Tobermore town that lies within Tobermore townland.

Size (acres, roods, poles)
| Year | a, r, p |
|---|---|
| 1851 | 295, 0, 29 |
| 1881 | 296, 0, 34 |
| 1901 | 296, 0, 34 |
| 1926 | 295, 2, 29 |

Earlier recorded forms
| Year | Form |
|---|---|
| 1609 | Tobarnmore (O.S.) |
| 1613 | ^{1}/_{2} Tubbor Moore |
| 1613 | Tobarmore (Charter) |
| 1622 | Tubermor |
| 1654 | Tobermore |
| 1657 | Tobarrmore |
| 1659c | Tobermoore Qr. |
| 1661 | Tobermore |
_{(O.S.) - Ordnance Survey map 1609 (Charter) - Charter of Londonderry 1613}

== See also ==
- Kilcronaghan
- List of townlands in Tobermore
- Tobermore
