= Moybeg Kirley =

Townland in County Londonderry, Northern Ireland

- townland

Irish transcription(s)
  - Derivation: Maigh Bheag
  - Meaning: "Little plain"

Irish transcription(s)
  - Derivation: Corrbhaile
  - Meaning: "Prominent townland"
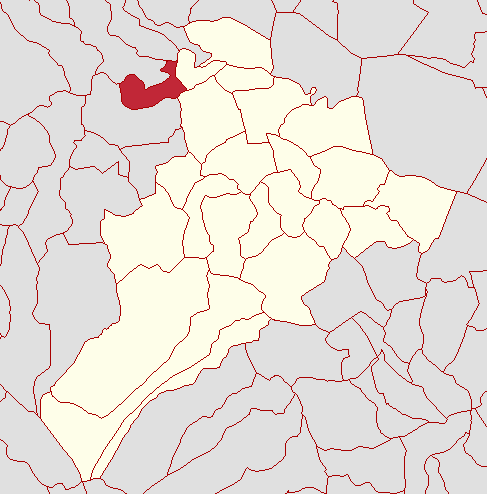

- Moybeg Kirley shown within Northern Ireland Moybeg Kirley (the United Kingdom)
- Coordinates: 54°49′01″N 6°44′28″W
- Sovereign state: United Kingdom
- Country: Northern Ireland
- County: County Londonderry
- Barony: Loughinsholin
- Civil parish: Kilcronaghan
- Plantation grant: Drapers Company
- First recorded: 1609

Government
  - Council: Mid Ulster District
  - Ward: Tobermore

Area
  - Total: 163.5 acres (66.15 ha)
- Irish grid ref: H8097

Moybeg Kirley (locally [ˌmɔibeɡˈkʲïli], from Irish Maigh Bheag 'little plain' and Corrbahile meaning "prominent townland") is a townland lying within the civil parish of Kilcronaghan, County Londonderry, Northern Ireland. It is in the north-west of the parish, with the Moyola River forming its northern boundary. It is bounded by the townlands of Drumconready, Drumcrow, Kirley, Moneyguiggy, and Moneyshanere. It was apportioned to the Drapers' Company.

The townland was part of the Tobermore electoral ward of the former Magherafelt District Council. In 1926 it was part of Carnamoney district electoral division as part of the Draperstown dispensary (registrar's) district of Magherafelt Rural District. It was also part of the historic barony of Loughinsholin.

== History ==
Population
Year	Pop.
1841	44
1851	41
1861	37
1871	35
1881	26
1891	17
1901	5 ^{[a]}
1911	9
1926	15
^[a] - decrease is attributed to emigration and removals

Size (acres, roods, poles)
Year	a, r, p
1851	162, 2, 22
1881	162, 1, 9
1901	162, 1, 9
1926	162, 2, 9

Earlier recorded forms
Year	Form
1609	Maybeg (O.S.)
1613	Moybegg (Charter)
1613	Moybegkerley
1622	Moybegkirlo
1659c	Molock beg Quarter
1661	Half Moybegg and Taynaghmore
1813	Moybeg (S.M.)
_{(O.S.) - Ordnance Survey map (1609) (Charter) - Charter of Londonderry (1613) (S.M.) - Sampson's Map}

== See also ==
- Kilcronaghan
- List of townlands in Tobermore
- Tobermore
