= Ballynahone Beg, Maghera civil parish =

Townland in County Londonderry, Northern Ireland

Coordinates: 54°49′22″N 6°41′25″W

Ballynahone Beg
- Location within Northern Ireland
- Country: Northern Ireland
- Sovereign state: United Kingdom
- Police: Northern Ireland
- Fire: Northern Ireland
- Ambulance: Northern Ireland

Ballynahone Beg is a townland lying within the civil parish of Maghera, County Londonderry, Northern Ireland. It lies in the south-west of the parish, and is bounded by the townlands of; Ballynahone More, Clooney, Craigadick, Drumballyhagan, Drumballyhagan Clark, Fallagloon, Falgortrevy, Mullagh, and Tobermore. It was not apportioned to any of the London livery companies, being retained as church lands.

The townland in 1926 was part of Maghera district electoral division as part of the Maghera dispensary (registrar's) district of Magherafelt Rural District. As part of Maghera civil parish, Ballynahone Beg also lies within the historic barony of Loughinsholin.

== See also ==
- Maghera
