= Crew, County Londonderry =

Townland in County Londonderry, Northern Ireland

Crew
- Townland
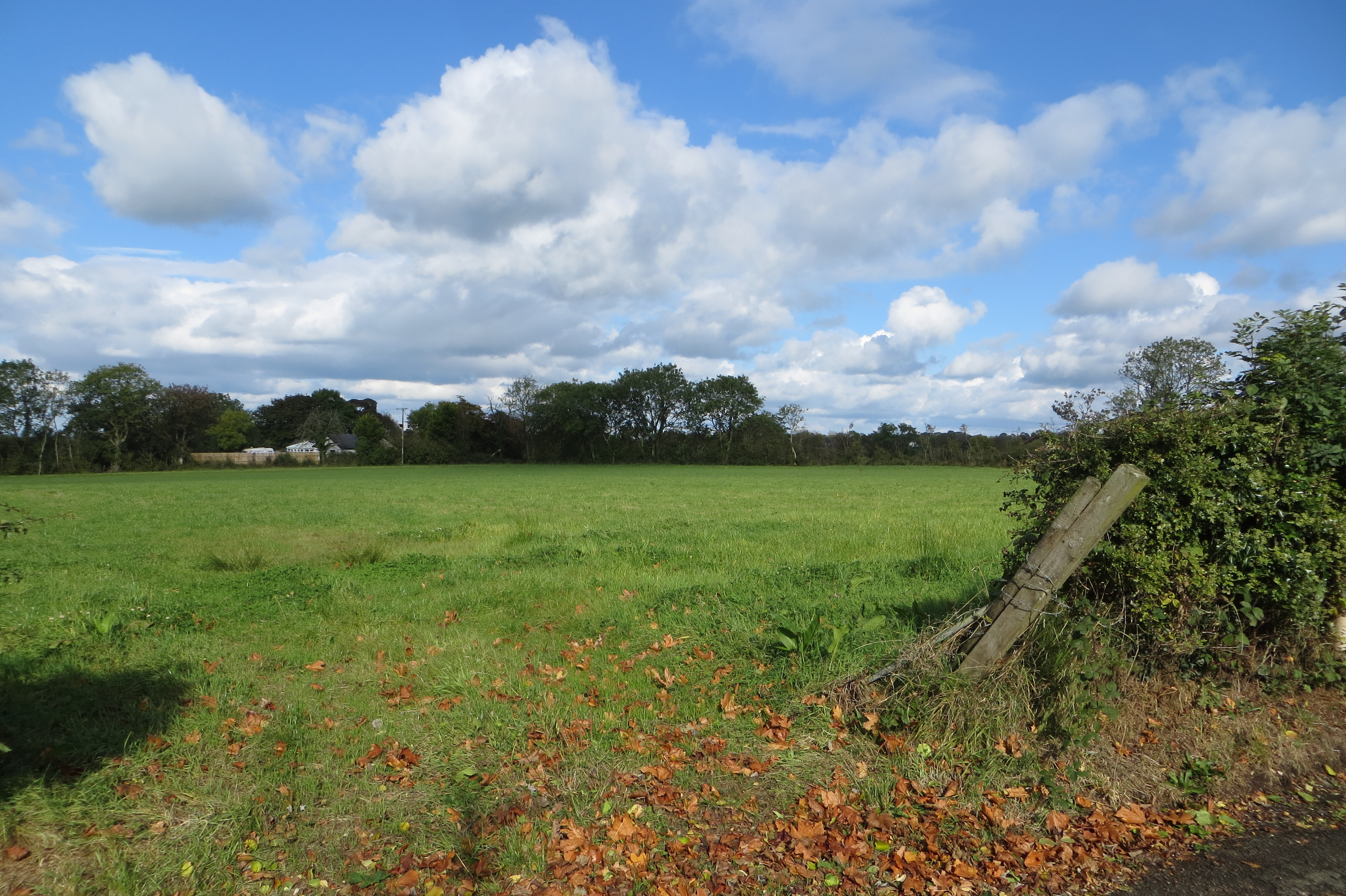
- Interactive map of Crew
- Coordinates: 54.716668°N 7.516667°W
- Sovereign state: United Kingdom
- Country: Northern Ireland
- County: County Londonderry
- Civil parish: Maghera

Crew is a townland in the civil parish of Maghera, County Londonderry, Northern Ireland. It is in the east-centre of the parish on the north boundary of the civil parish of Termoneeny, and is bounded by the townlands of Ballymacilcurr, Culnady, Curragh, Moneymore, Mullagh, Tamnymartin, and Tamnymullan. It was not apportioned to any of the London livery companies, being kept as church lands.
