= Ballynahone =

Ballynahone (from Irish Baile na hAbhann 'townland of the river') may refer to the following places in Northern Ireland:

- Ballynahone Beg, Maghera civil parish
- Ballynahone Bog
- Ballynahone More
