= Watty Graham =

Irish farmer and revolutionary

Walter (Watty) Graham
- Born: 1763; Maghera, County Londonderry, Ireland
- Died: 1798 (aged 34–35); Maghera
- Occupations: Farmer, Reformed Presbyterian Church elder
- Organization(s): National Guard, Maghera
- Movement: Society of United Irishmen

Walter (Watty) Graham (also called Watty Grimes) (1763–1798) was a farmer and Presbyterian Church elder in the north of Ireland who was executed for his role as a United Irishman in the Rebellion of 1798.

Graham was born outside Maghera, County Londonderry, where, like his father, he was an elder of the local Presbyterian church. During the revival of the Irish Volunteer movement in the early 1790s, the church minister, John Glendy, regularly advanced theological justifications for democratic reform, and celebrated the French Revolution. In a sermon that Graham and other congregants had reported, with a vote of thanks, in the United Irish newspaper, Northern Star, Glendy hailed the French victory at Valmy in September 1792 as "the signal interposition of heaven on behalf of the French Nation and Universal Rights of Conscience"

As a delegate to Presbyterian synods in Lurgan 1793, Graham made contact with the leadership of the United Irishmen In the face of a new martial-law regime, and in the hope of French assistance, they began to organise for a republican insurrection

With his congregants in Maghera, Graham formed a new volunteer corps under the United Irish county command of William McKeever, a Roman Catholic. After the French example, they styled themselves the National Guard. When the call came, Maghera was to rise simultaneously with Toome and Randalstown, disarm the local forces of the Protestant (Church of Ireland) Ascendancy—the yeomanry and Orangemen—and march, as needed, to join rebels from Antrim.

United plans were disrupted by sweeping arrests. Two weeks after the initial rising in the south, Graham received orders from Henry Joy McCracken who in the confusion had taken command in County Antrim: "Army of Ulster, tomorrow we march for Antrim. Drive the Garrison of Randalstown before you and hasten to form a junction with the Commander-in-Chief. The first year of liberty the 6th day of June, 1798."

On 7 June 1798, Graham mustered with several hundred men (reports suggest anywhere between 300 and 5,000). They held Maghera that Morning, and marched that afternoon to Crewe Hill about a mile from the village. When the news was received of McCracken's defeat at Antrim Town, and that a large government body had gathered on the Glen road, in council with McKeever, Glendy, and Thomas Clarke from Swatragh, Graham concluded, with few firearms and no artillery, the town was lost. They hoped for a covered withdrawal, but in the event most of assembled host fled the field (some later joining the loyalists) while a few stood their ground, resulting in small skirmishes. In the days that followed men, women and even children were flogged and, after it was billeted by the Tipperary Militia, everything, but the bible, in Maghera Presbyterian Church was burned.

Among those rebels subsequently taken prisoner, the local magistrate, Colonel George Lenox-Conyngham of Springhill House, insisted that with the exception of a single "Papist" and one "Church of England man", they were all Presbyterians. Father Matthew McCusker, however, is recorded as giving last rites to an insurgent in the town on the 8th, and the priest later organised surrender of arms. The local Red-Coat commander, Colonel James Leith, reported on 19 June that United men among the Presbyterians continued to conspire, with "a Dissenting minister [possibly Glendy], the schoolmaster ... and others deeply implicated".

Glendy, who eventually surrendered himself, was tried for sedition, but like a number of tainted Presbyterian clergy was permitted exile in the United States.

Folk lore states that Graham, with less hope of leniency, sought to board a ship undetected but was betrayed by the Church of Ireland rector in Tamlaght, from whom he had tried to collect a debt. On June 19 Graham was hanged, according to local tradition, from a tree in Church of Ireland Rectory in Maghera. His body was then decapitated and his head paraded through the village. What really happened was that Graham surrendered the Crew arms to Col Leith and Cunningham on the Glen road in the evening of the 7th of June and was taken captive, he was quickly court martialled and half hanged outside the Church of Ireland Manse, he was then dragged up the road and head removed. This was a successful attempt to get those still holding out on Dunleady hill fort to surrender, Dunleady surrendered the following day. It was reported in a letter published in the Belfast Newsletter on 9 June that Walter Graham had been executed.

Henry Cooke, the later conservative and loyalist Presbyterian Church leader, recalled seeing soldiers burning Graham's house on the 4th of June. Graham's betrayer was subsequently murdered.

Graham's wife and daughter (whose names are unrecorded) eventually emigrated to the United States.

The local GAA Club in Maghera and their playing field are named in Graham's honour.
