= William Abell =

English vintner and politician

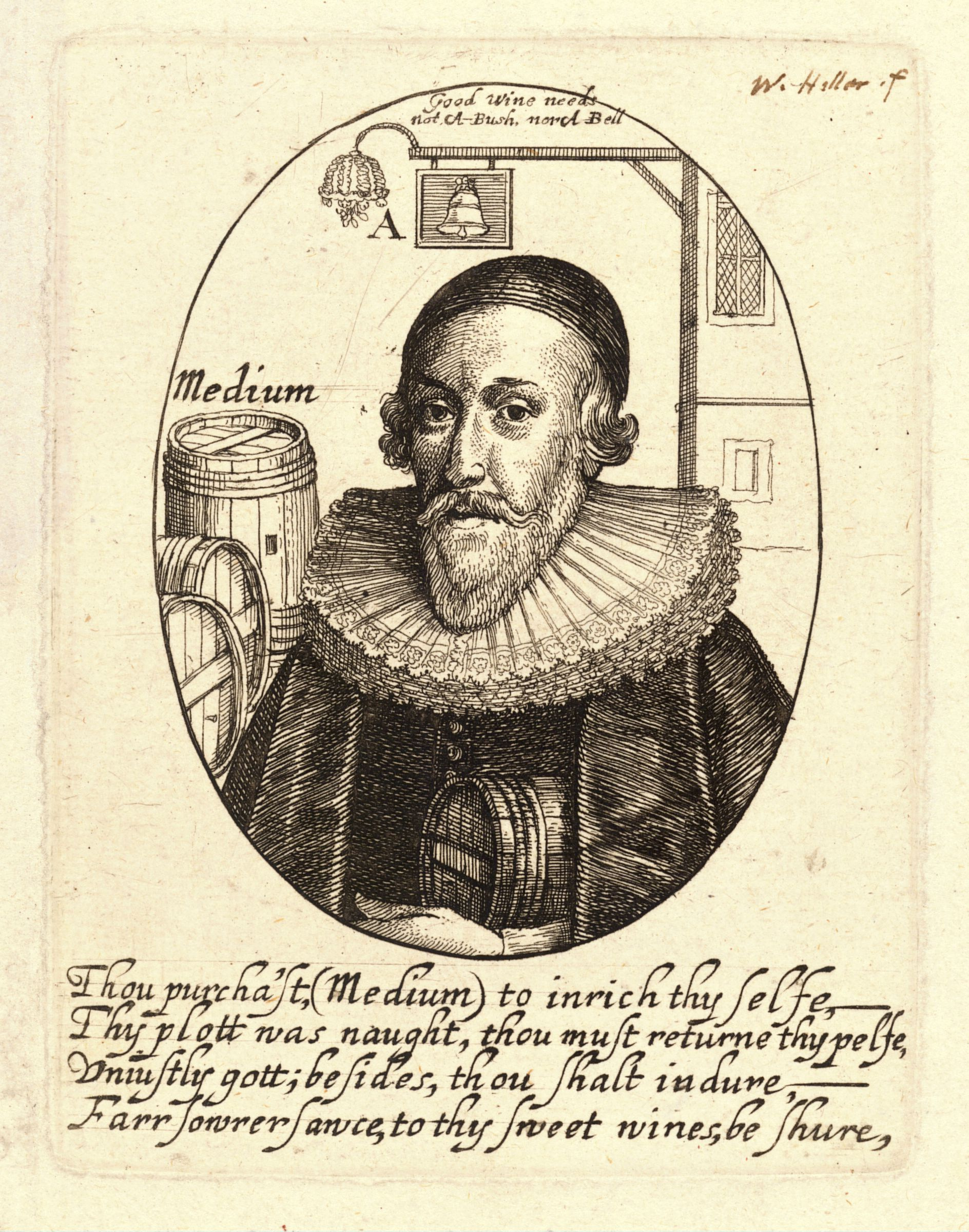
- Alderman Abel on an etching by Wenceslaus Hollar
- Born: c. 1584
- Died: in 1655 or later
- Occupation: Sheriff of London
- Children: 4

William Abell (born c. 1584, died in or after 1655) was an English vintner who became master of the Vintners' Company. As a politician he was an alderman and later sheriff of London. He is associated with a controversy over the manner and terms on which a monopoly in the area of wine retailing was granted to members of the Vintners' Company.

== Biography ==
Abell was born at Oundle to Thomas Abell and wife, Suzanna Barker. Between 1598 and 1602 he was apprenticed to the London Vintners' Company. He took ownership of The Ship tavern off Old Fish Street, and was married with four children. He sought office within the Vintners Company, being raised to the livery in 1614 and being appointed an assistant in 1628, eventually becoming its master in 1637. He also sought political office within London, being elected deputy alderman for the Queenhithe ward in 1634. He was subsequently alderman for Bread Street ward in 1636, and elected sheriff of London in 1637–8.

In both offices he was engaged in the controversies of the time. In 1637, as sheriff, he caused the arrest of a puritan minister, Henry Burton, in a manner which earned him the enmity of the puritan community in the city.

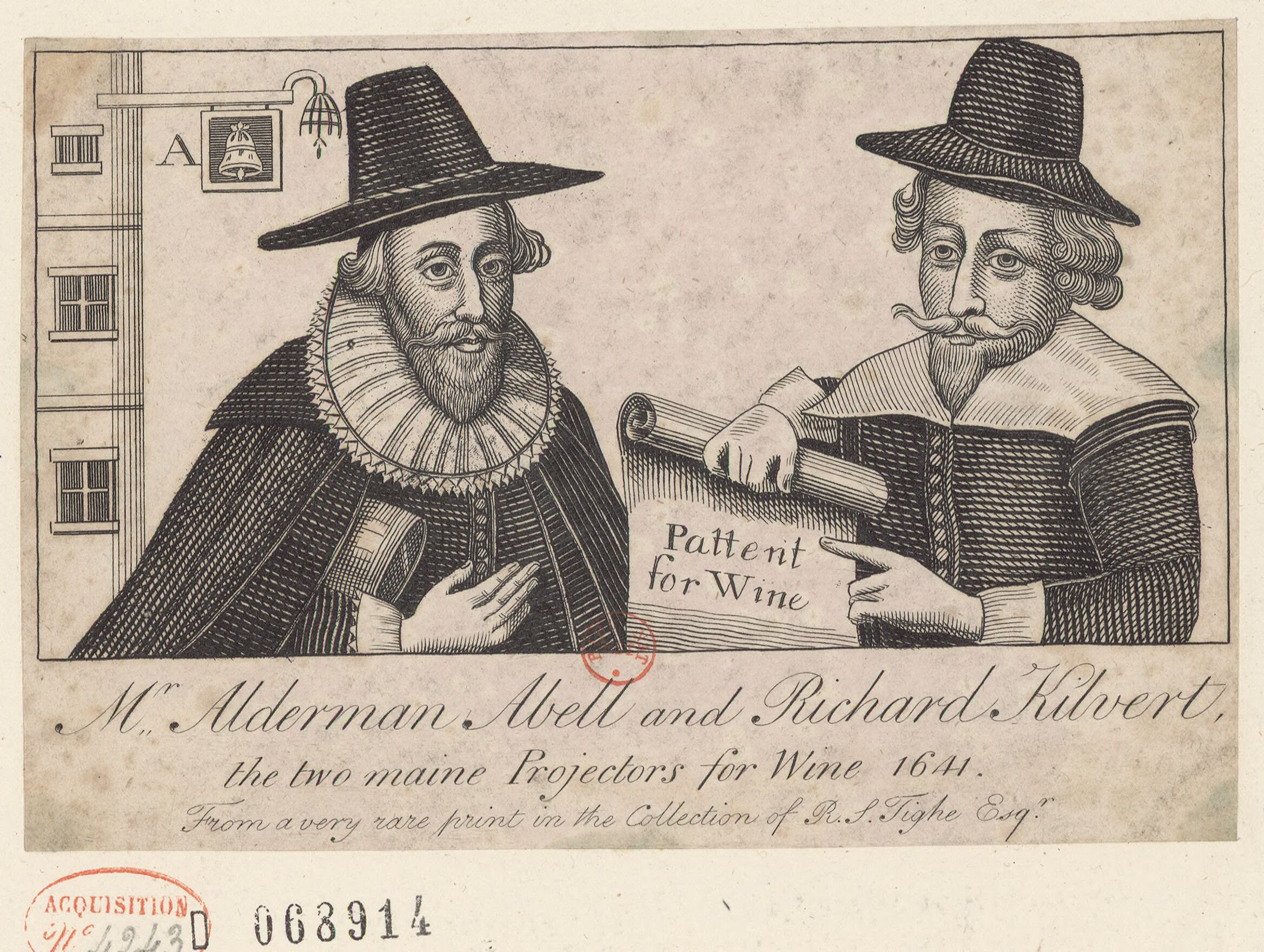
William Abell and Richard Kilvert

The vintners guild was engaged at the time in a financial dispute with the king. Charles I had made heavy and illegal demands upon the vintners' resources, and on their resisting his proposals his ministers had threatened proceedings against them in the Star Chamber. But Abell undertook, at the instigation of the Marquis of Hamilton, and with the aid of Richard Kilvert, a liveryman, stated to be the alderman's cousin, to bring the vintners to terms. With some trouble he obtained from them a promise to pay to the king 40s. per tun on all wine sold by them, on the understanding that they might charge their customers an additional penny per quart. Abell was nominated one of the farmers of the new duty; but many merchants refused to pay it, and Abell petitioned for means to coerce them.

In 1639 Abell, whose name had become a byword in the city as a venal supporter of the government and as a placehunter, became the licenser of tavern-keepers, and in that office did not diminish his unpopularity.

Barely a month elapsed after the first meeting of the Long Parliament before Abell was summoned to answer the committee of grievances for his part in the imposition of the arbitrary duty of 40 shillings per tun on wine. On 27 November 1640 he was committed to the custody of the sergeant-at-arms by order of the Commons. Bail was refused, and on 26 May 1641 it was resolved to bring in a bill against Abell and Kilvert as 'projectors' of the 40s. duty, 'to the end to make them exemplary.' On 1 September following Abell was released on bail in £20,000, and on 9 April 1642, having been declared a 'delinquent,' he offered to make his submission to the house; on payment of £2,000 his request was granted, and pardon promised him. In the same year he resigned his office of alderman.

Ten years later Abell was again imprisoned. On 12 March 1652 he was given into the custody of Sir John Lenthall on the petition of certain persons to whom he owed money, borrowed in behalf of the Vintners' Company several years previously. He was not, however, kept in close confinement, but allowed to reside with his son at Hatfield, Herts. On 5 May 1652 it was reported to the council of state that he had spoken 'dangerous words' against the existing government, and measures were devised to keep him under closer surveillance. On 25 February 1653–4 he petitioned the judges sitting at Salters' Hall for the payment of £1,333. 13s. 4d. owing to him from persons concerned with him in farming the wine duty. On 7 June 1655 a passport to Holland was given to him, but nothing seems ascertainable of his subsequent career.

A number of pamphlets and broadsides condemning Abell's action in the matter of the wine duty appeared in 1640 and 1641. Soon after his first imprisonment by the Commons Thomas Heywood published (18 December 1640) a tract dealing with 'a priest, a judge, and a patentee,' in which Abell was severely attacked as the patentee. In 1641 appeared An Exact Legendary, compendiously containing the whole life of Alderman Abel, the maine Proiector and Patentee for the raising of Wines. He is here described as springing from the lowest class of society, and thriving through his extreme parsimony. His wealth is computed at from 'ten to twelve thousand pounds.' He is denounced as having 'broken' both 'merchants and retailors,' and the city is described as rejoicing in his removal from his shop in Aldermanbury to a 'stronger house.' Other tracts relating to Abell, all of which appeared in 1641, bear the titles: The Copie of a Letter sent from the Roaring Boyes in Elizium, to two errant Knights of the Grape in Limbo, Alderman Abel and Mr. Kilvert; Time's Alteration; and The Last Discourse betwixt Master Abel and Master Richard Kilvert. An attempt to defend Abell from the charge of obtaining by undue influence the consent of the Vintners' Company to the wine duty was printed under the title of A True Discovery of the Proiectors of the Wine Proiect, and a reply to this defence appeared in A true Relation of the Proposing, Threatening, and Perswading of the Vintners to yeeld to the Imposition upon Wines.

An engraved portrait of the alderman by Hollar was issued in 1641. Above it is written Good wine needs not A-Bush nor A-Bell. Abell is often referred to in hostile broadsides as ‘Cain's brother,’ and as ‘Alderman Medium.’

The wine retail monopoly and Abell's place within the controversy is discussed in an academic paper for the American Historic Association, Public Discourse, Corporate Citizenship, and State Formation in Early Modern England.
