= Maghera Old Church =

Defunct church in Ireland

- Old St. Lurach's Church
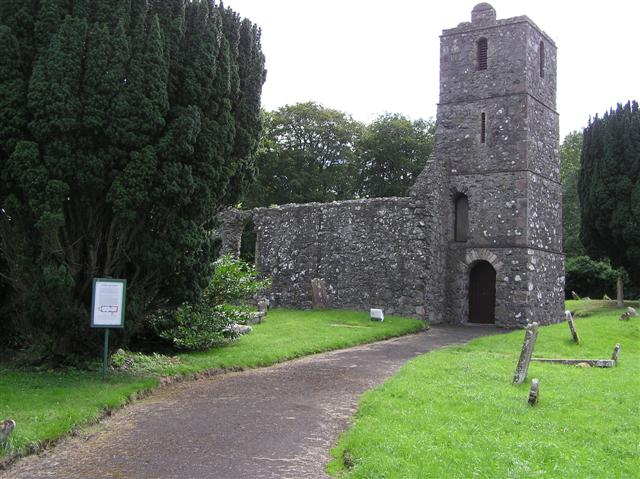
- Maghera Old Church
- 54.8429°N 6.6699°W
- Location: Maghera, County Londonderry
- Country: Northern Ireland
- Denomination: Church of Ireland
- Previous denomination: Roman Catholic

History
- Status: Ruined
- Founded: 6th Century
- Founder: St. Lurach
- Events: Plundered 1135

Architecture
- Functional status: Abandoned
- Heritage designation: Scheduled Monument and Monument in State Care
- Closed: 1819

Administration
- Division: Department for Communities
- District: Mid Ulster

Maghera Old Church (also known as Old St. Lurach's Church) is the ruins of a church in Maghera, County Londonderry, Northern Ireland. It is a scheduled monument and a Monument in State Care. It was originally founded by St Lurach at some point during the 6th century, likely as a monastery. It is mentioned in the Annals of Ulster when it was plundered by Vikings in 832 and many of its abbots killed. The church later suffered significant damaged when it was burned in 1135.

From the mid-12th century until 1245 it was the seat of a bishop, after which it became a parish church. It was damaged due to warfare in 1688, but rebuilt. It was later abandoned in 1819 when the new St. Lurach's Church was built across the road.

In 1880, following the disestablishment of the Church of Ireland, it passed into state care. An extensive conservation effort was completed in 1984. In the graveyard, west of the church, is a cross-carved pillar stone, which is traditionally believed to hold the remains of St. Lurach. The church also contains one of the earliest depictions of the crucifixion in Irish architecture, and is one of the most important Romanesque monuments in Ulster.

== Church Building ==
The Church itself has undergone a tumultuous history having been built and repaired numerous times. Whilst founded as an ecclesiastical site in the 6th century, the earliest of the current ruins is the nave which dates from the 10th century. The west door, which contains the depiction of the crucifixion was likely added in the 12th century, possibly after the church as burnt in 1135. The door has a lintel outside and a arch within. The structure is very similar to that seen at the nearby Banagher Old Church. The later added around the year 1200. There are signs that the church continued to be modified throughout the rest of the Medieval period. The tower was added in the 17th century as a belfry (which may have been following damage done in 1688).

== Depiction of the Crucifixion ==
The church contains one of only three depictions of the crucifixion in Ireland to have survived from the 12th century, the others are at Raphoe in County Donegal and Dunshaughlin in County Meath. The heavily damaged depiction sits in the lintel above the rebuilt Romanesque west doorway and shows Jesus accompanied by fifteen figures and four angels.

Jesus is at the centre of the scene with disproportionately long arms on the cross. His face is too damaged to make out any features, but he is depicted wearing only a loin cloth. He is flanked by Stephaton and Longinus, with a female figure (likely the Virgin Mary) also positioned close by. The thieves crucified with Jesus are also depicted. Both are in profile facing him, with their heads above his arms whilst sandwiched against the cross. Another figure appears to be holding a whip, whilst nine other figures are also present in the scene. The angels are arranged in pairs above each of Jesus’ arms.

The depiction of the crucifixion is highly unusual, with inspiration from contemporary Irish art, but also clear influence from abroad. There is some scholarly debate as to where this influence may have originated.
