= John Glendy =

American chaplain (1755–1832)

Reverend John Glendy
- Born: 24 June 1755; Maghera, County Londonderry, Ireland
- Died: 4 October 1832 (aged 77); Baltimore, Maryland, U.S.
- Education: University of Glasgow
- Occupation: Presbyterian Minister
- Known for: Advocacy of democratic reform
- Movement: Irish Volunteers

John Glendy (1755 – 1832) was a Presbyterian clergyman from County Londonderry in Ireland, who, after being forced into American exile for his association with the United Irishmen, found favour with President Thomas Jefferson and became a leading cleric in Baltimore.

== Early life ==
John Glendy (sometimes spelt "Glendie" or "Glendye") was born at Faughanvale near Maghera, County Londonderry, in the province of Ulster to Samuel and Mary Glendy, on 24 June 1755. From an early age, his pious mother directed him toward the ministry.

After Latin school, he studied at the University of Glasgow. On his return, Frederick Hervey, the Earl Lord Bishop at Londonderry was so impressed with the young graduate that he offered to take him along as a chaplain on a tour of Europe. Glendy would have to have joined the Bishop in the established Anglican (Church of Ireland) communion. He refused.

== Republican preacher ==
Glendy was ordained by the Route Presbytery as minister of Maghera on 26 December 1778. In 1795 he was called to the Garvagh Presbyterian Church.

From 1780, as both captain and chaplain, Glendy served in a Maghera company of Irish Volunteers. Ostensibly formed to secure Ireland following French intervention in the American war, the militia allowed Presbyterians to arm and drill independently of the landed (Church of Ireland) Ascendancy. In full sympathy with their "Scotch-Irish" kinfolk in the American colonies, they seized the opportunity to debate and propose their own rights and grievances.

When, with the further inspiration of the French Revolution, the volunteer movement revived in the early 1790s, Glendy regularly advanced theological justifications for a programme of Catholic emancipation and democratic reform. From his pulpit, he hailed the French victory at Valmy in September 1792 as "the signal interposition of heaven on behalf of the French Nation and Universal Rights of Conscience". Members of the congregation had his words published with a vote of thanks in the United Irish newspaper, Northern Star. Associated as United Irishmen, they then formed a new volunteer corps. Styling themselves, after the French fashion, the National Guard, they admitted Roman Catholics to their ranks. Sources conflict as to whether they were joined in any formal capacity by Glendy, but the government was left in no doubt as to his sympathies.

Glendy was denounced in print by James Spottswood, agent in Magherafelt for the Salters Company of London (original Plantation undertakers and landowners).

Glendy of Maghera is tainted with the blackest of principles of revolution to king George the 3rd and all his loyal subjects in this kingdom. His many sermons are but discourses containing treason. We know that he and many so-called members of his meeting attended mass in full regimentals of a rebel army out of the king’s peace. We have seen him on diverse occasions with the popish priest of Magherafelt in that union of the Romish church, with whom he does conspire against this realm. In the delivery of a discourse in the Meeting House [Glendy's church], papists were present. On the pulpit was printed in black letters “Vive La Republique,” out of honour to the blood revolution in France.

As war with the new French Republic and increased repression at home banished hopes for reform, the talk among the United Irishmen was no longer of breaking the Ascendancy's monopoly of representation, but of an Irish Republic. Church elder, Watty Graham and other National Guard officers organised for an insurrection. On June 7, 1798, they mustered hundreds (by some reports, 5000) men in Maghera. But before he could advance them beyond the town, the rebels (with few firearms and no artillery) dispersed on news of the rebel defeat at Antrim and the approach of Crown forces.

In the weeks that followed, the Tipperary Militia, Catholic conscripts under English officers, tore up the interior of Glendy's church for firewood. Rather than accept this indignity, the congregation fired the building and burnt to the ground with the church registers and the muster rolls of the National Guard.

After a few days, Glendy surrendered himself. There is an account that places Glendy on June 8 in a "council of war" with Graham, the county's United Irish commander William McKeever (a Roman Catholic), and Thomas Clarke from Swatragh (deciding on what they hoped would be a covered withdrawal). But Glendy was convicted for sedition rather than treason, and like Thomas Ledlie Birch, William Steel Dickson, William Sinclair, prominent Presbyterian clerics similarly identified with the rebel cause, he was allowed American exile. Together with his wife, Elizabeth Cresswell, and six children, he sailed for Norfolk, Virginia.

== Jefferson's protégé, Baltimore ==
Glendy became a supply minister of the Presbyterian Churches of Bethel, Hebron and Staunton, Virginia. There he preached a sermon on the death of George Washington, on February 22, 1800; it was so well received it was reprinted into the 1820s and 1830s. An examination Augusta County records suggest that many in Glendy’s Staunton congregation were immigrants from home and United Irish sympathisers.

In 1803, he then went on, with Thomas Jefferson's recommendation, and over the objection of Federalist sympathisers, to be pastor of the Second Presbyterian Church in Baltimore (a favoured destination for Ulster emigrants). Glendy’s new congregation contained some of Baltimore’s more prominent Irish-Americans. They included the physician, John Campbell White, a United Irish exile from Templepatrick, County Antrim who was to play a leading role in the defence of Baltimore against the British in 1812.

In expressing his gratitude to Jefferson in 1803, Glendy did not hesitate to remember Ireland – "Ah poor Erin! ill-fated Hibernia! much I fear thy chains are rivetted forever" – or to suggest that in driving out the [Federalist] "Aristocracy", Jefferson's administration would prove her friend.

Jefferson’s influence likely contributed to Glendy’s election as chaplain for the United States House of Representatives for the first session of the Ninth Congress, on 4 December 1805. He declined the position, and he declined the chaplaincy of the U.S. Senate when offered to him on 6 December 1816. His reasons are unknown, but it may be that he found his Old-Light biblical faith difficult to reconcile with Jefferson's secularised understanding of religious liberty. His friend Samuel Miller at the Princeton Theological Seminary, also an anti-Federalist, was insistent that "every civil magistrate ought to be a christian, to love the church, and to seek to promote her interests."

On the occasion of a presbytery meeting in Washington, D.C., Glendy was described as "an elegantly dressed man ... his complexion pale, and his eyes a piercing blue", who being short of stature stood to orate on a large pulpit bible. To those who objected he explained that he had "stood upon the Bible from his early years, almost from his cradle, that it was the basis of all his hopes".

In 1822 Glendy was given the Doctor of Divinity degree by the University of Maryland. In 1832, John Brackenridge, D.D. became his associate pastor at Second Church and soon succeeded Glendy in the pastorate there, due to Glendy's declining health.

Glendy died in Philadelphia at the home of his daughter on 4 October 1832. His body was buried in Baltimore. Obituaries appeared in at least two newspapers in Ireland. The Belfast Commercial Chronicle reported:

At Philadelphia, in October last, at an advanced age, the Rev. John Glendy. Doctor of divinity for upwards of twenty years minister of the congregation of Maghera Co Derry, and latterly of the city of Baltimore of the United States. In the unfortunate distraction of 1798, he was obliged to leave his native country. He was first settled in America as minister of Staunton, in Virginia, and afterwards removed to Baltimore. In the Country of his adoption, he was highly esteemed by all classes, and could number among his friends and admirers the late President Jefferson, with whom he became early acquainted and who, till the close of his life, uniformly treated him with kindness and attention. He was for several years, one of the ministers appointed to preach before Congress. His remains were conveyed to Baltimore and attended to the grave a large number not only of the congregation with which he had been for upwards of 30 years usefully connected, but by a large concourse of the most respectable inhabitants of that city.

Religious titles
| Preceded by Jesse Lee | Chaplain of the United States Senate; December 8, 1815 – December 15, 1816 | Succeeded by Sereno Edwards Dwight |
