= Gulladuff =

Village in County Londonderry, Northern Ireland

Coordinates: 54°50′N 6°36′W

Gulladuff: Irish: An Guala Dhubh
- Village and Townland
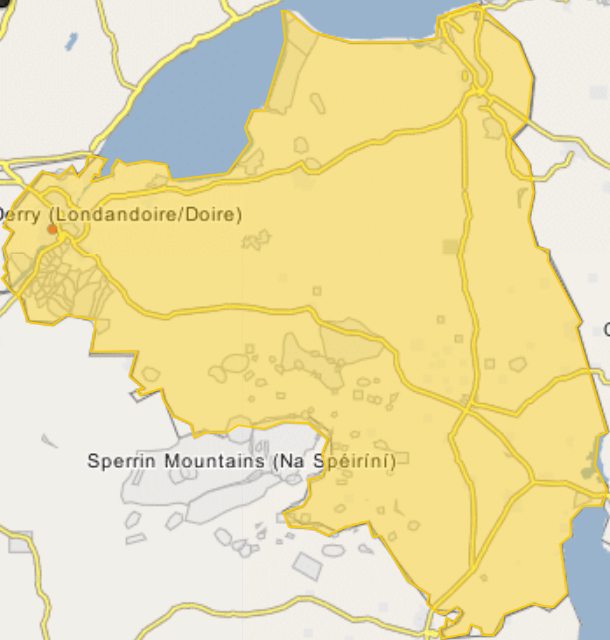
- Location within County Londonderry Location within Northern Ireland
- District: Mid Ulster
- County: County Londonderry
- Country: Northern Ireland
- Sovereign state: United Kingdom
- Post town: MAGHERAFELT
- Postcode district: BT45
- Police: Northern Ireland
- Fire: Northern Ireland
- Ambulance: Northern Ireland
- UK Parliament: Mid Ulster
- NI Assembly: Mid Ulster

Gulladuff (from Irish An Guala Dhubh, meaning 'black shoulders') is a small village and townland in County Londonderry, Northern Ireland. It is situated within the district of Mid Ulster and is represented by the Carntogher DEA on Mid Ulster District Council.

Gulladuff is part of the Maghera civil parish, and also part of both the Church of Ireland's Maghera ecclesiastical parish and the Catholic Church's Lavey ecclesiastical parish.

The football pitch for Lavey GAC is situated just south of the village.

In February 1989, a Sinn Féin Councillor on Magherafelt District Council, John Davey, was assassinated by the Ulster Volunteer Force as he returned to his home in Gulladuff.

== Demographics ==
=== 1911 Census ===
In the 1911 census, the village had a population of 128. Of those present for the census, 69 were female and 59 were male. Of those who stated their religious affiliation; 98 (76.4%) identified as Catholic, 23 (18.1%) identified as Church of Ireland, 6 (4.7%) identified as Baptist, and 1 identified as a Presbyterian (0.8%).

=== 1937 Census ===
In the 1937 census, the village had a population of 139.

=== 1951 – 1991 ===
In the 1951 census, the village had a population of 149. Of those present for the census, 76 (51%) were female and 73 (49%) were male.

In the 1981 census, the village had a population of 289. Of those usually resident, 139 (48.1%) were female and 150 (51.9%) were male.

In the 1991 census, the village had a population of 318. Of those usually resident, 162 (50.94%) were female and 156 (49.06%) were male.

=== 2001 Census ===
In the 2001 census it had a population of 405 people.
