= Curran, County Londonderry =

Village in County Londonderry, Northern Ireland

Coordinates: 54.796°N 6.616°W

Curran: Curran
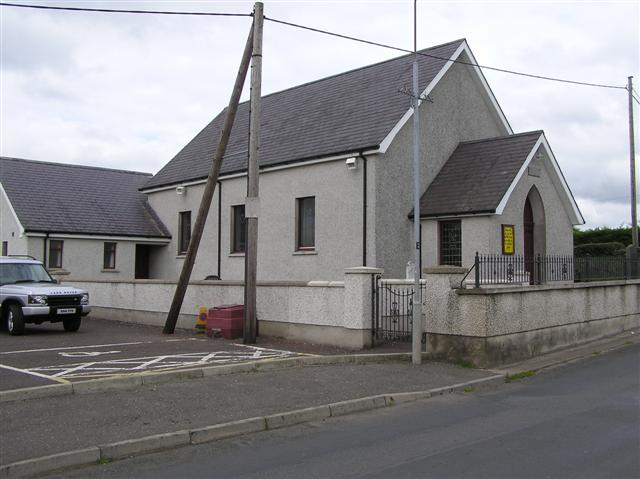
- Curran Presbyterian Church

- Location within Northern Ireland
- Population: 121 (2021 Census)
- District: Mid-Ulster
- County: County Londonderry
- Country: Northern Ireland
- Sovereign state: United Kingdom
- Postcode district: BT
- Dialling code: 028
- NI Assembly: Mid Ulster

Curran (from Irish an Corrán, meaning 'the crescent') is a small village and townland in County Londonderry, Northern Ireland.

== Politics ==
Culnady is part of the Moyola district electoral area for local elections to Mid-Ulster District Council, and the Mid-Ulster constituency for Westminster and Northern Ireland Assembly elections.

== Demography ==
Culnady recorded a population of 121 residents across 51 households in the 2021 Census.
