= River Moyola =

Coordinates: 54.800°N 7.083°W

Moyola River
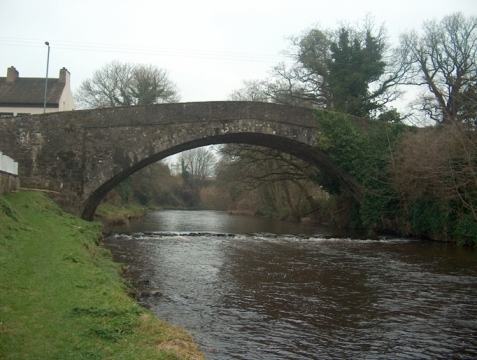
- Castledawson Dawsons Bridge over the Moyola
- Native name: Abhainn na Scríne; An Bhior

Location
- Country: Northern Ireland

Physical characteristics
- Source
  - location: Sperrin Mountains
- Mouth
  - location: Lough Neagh
- Length: 27 mi (43 km)

The River Moyola or Moyola River (Irish: Abhainn na Scríne) stretches for approximately 27 miles from the Sperrin Mountains to Lough Neagh. The Moyola starts a small river (3-5 metres; 10' to 16') for the first few miles of its length and proceeds to expand to a medium-sized river (5-20 metres; 16' to 65') and then to a large river (20 metres +; 65' plus) for its last couple of miles before Lough Neagh. In ancient times, the River Moyola was known as the 'Bior', and served as the border between the Airgiallan kingdoms of Fir Li and Ui Tuirtri.

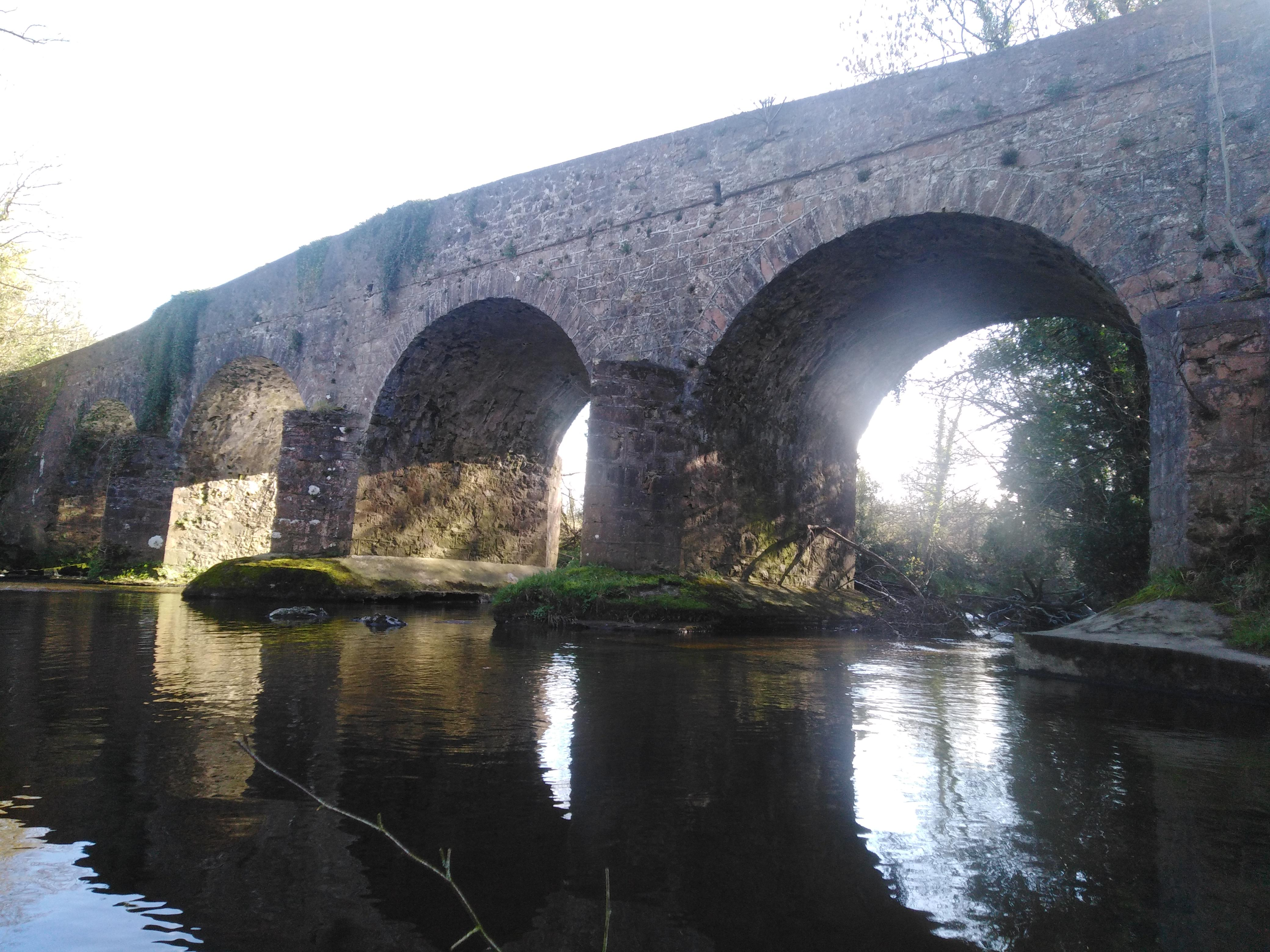
Forgetown Bridge

According to Deirdre and Laurence Flanagan in their book, Irish Place Names, the River Moyola derives its name from Magh nÉola, meaning Éolas Plain.

== Bridges ==
The Bridges of the Moyola River are,

Upper River: Bealnamala Bridge, Moyard Bridge, Church Bridge, Owenreagh Bridge, Disert Bridge, Derrynoyd Bridge.

Middle River: Weddell Bridge, Forgetown Bridge, Lisnamuck Bridge, A29 Fortwilliam Bridge, Curran Bridge A6 Broagh Bridge.

Lower River: Dawsons Bridge, Moyola Bridge, Railway Bridge A6 Toome Bypass Bridge, Aughrim Bridge, New Bridge.

== Tributaries ==
Douglas River: The largest tributary on the river around 20 meters at its widest point it formally starts at the joining's of the Dunlogan and Drumderg Rivers just outside Moneyneany and after the Altalacky River joins the main river. The river flows through a mixture of woodland and fields before it reaches the Boheradaile Bridge known more as the Seven Arch Bridge — A concrete structure consisting of seven corrugated steel pipes built in 1937. The River then flows through the Seven Arch Bridge onwards about a mile before joining the Moyola above the Weddell Bridge at a spot known to anglers as the Meetings.

Whitewater River: The second largest tributary starting up on the slopes of Slieve Gallion where a dam was constructed on the mountain to divert water into a network of pipes feeding Lough Fea. The riverbed now running dry for a brief time before the flow picks up again. It flows under the Corrick Bridge the tallest in Ballinascreen the onwards for a few miles to the village of Straw before joining the river downstream from Disert Bridge. Its tributary the Blackwater is the main outflow from Lough Fea.

Grange Water River: The third largest tributary river averaging around 5 meters wide it starts on Slieve Gallion before flowing through Longfield then Desertmartin before snaking its way across the lowland area towards Curran before joining the Moyola River just upstream from Curran Bridge.

Altagoan River: A small river which also starts on Slieve Gallion it flows just to the east of Draperstown flowing in a northwest direction to join the Moyola just off the Weddell Bridge Road.

Mullagh River: A small river about 3 meters wide along most of its length it starts at the confluence of the Milltown Burn and Back Burn just outside Maghera before it flows under both the New Mullagh Bridge built in 1972 by Glovers of Moneymore then the Old Bridge it replaced. It then flows through the low lying flood plains towards Carricknakielt before it dips under the A6 shortly after that it joins the big river downstream from the Ballynahone Bridge.

Glengomma Water River: A mountain stream which flows from near the Glenelly Valley flowing down through Bancran down towards the Moyola where it joins at the Sixtowns.

Coppies River: The smallest tributary an urban stream which flows through the urban areas of Magherafelt it joined the Moyola between Castledawson and Newbridge.

== Hydrology ==
The flow or discharge of the river is measured near to its mouth in Lough Neagh. The catchment area to the gauging station is 304 square kilometres (117 mi^{2}), which yields an average flow of 8.4 cubic metres per second (300 cu ft/s). The maximum recorded flow between 1971 and 2012 was 156 cubic metres per second (5,500 cu ft/s) on 19 January 1988.

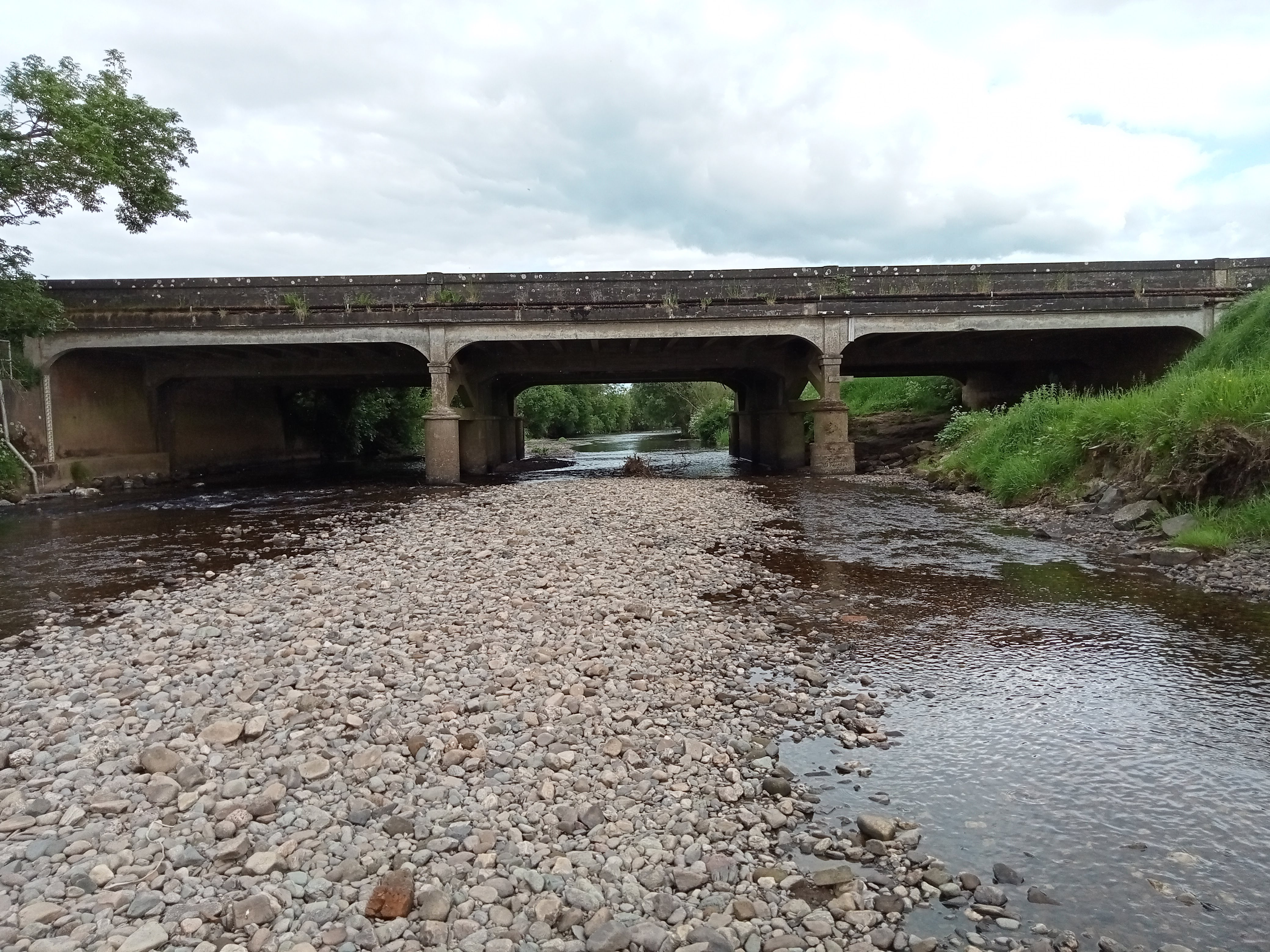
Fortwilliam Bridge Outside Tobermore

The catchment has a varied geology including limestone, schist, shale and basalt with outcrops of chalk. Overlying this solid geology are superficial deposits of glacial till, plus sand and aggregates. Land use is primarily grassland, with areas of bog and heathland, but includes the towns of Magherafelt and Maghera. The average annual rainfall in the catchment is 1,224 millimetres (48.2 in), which is somewhat higher than the average for United Kingdom at 1,101 millimetres (43.3 in).

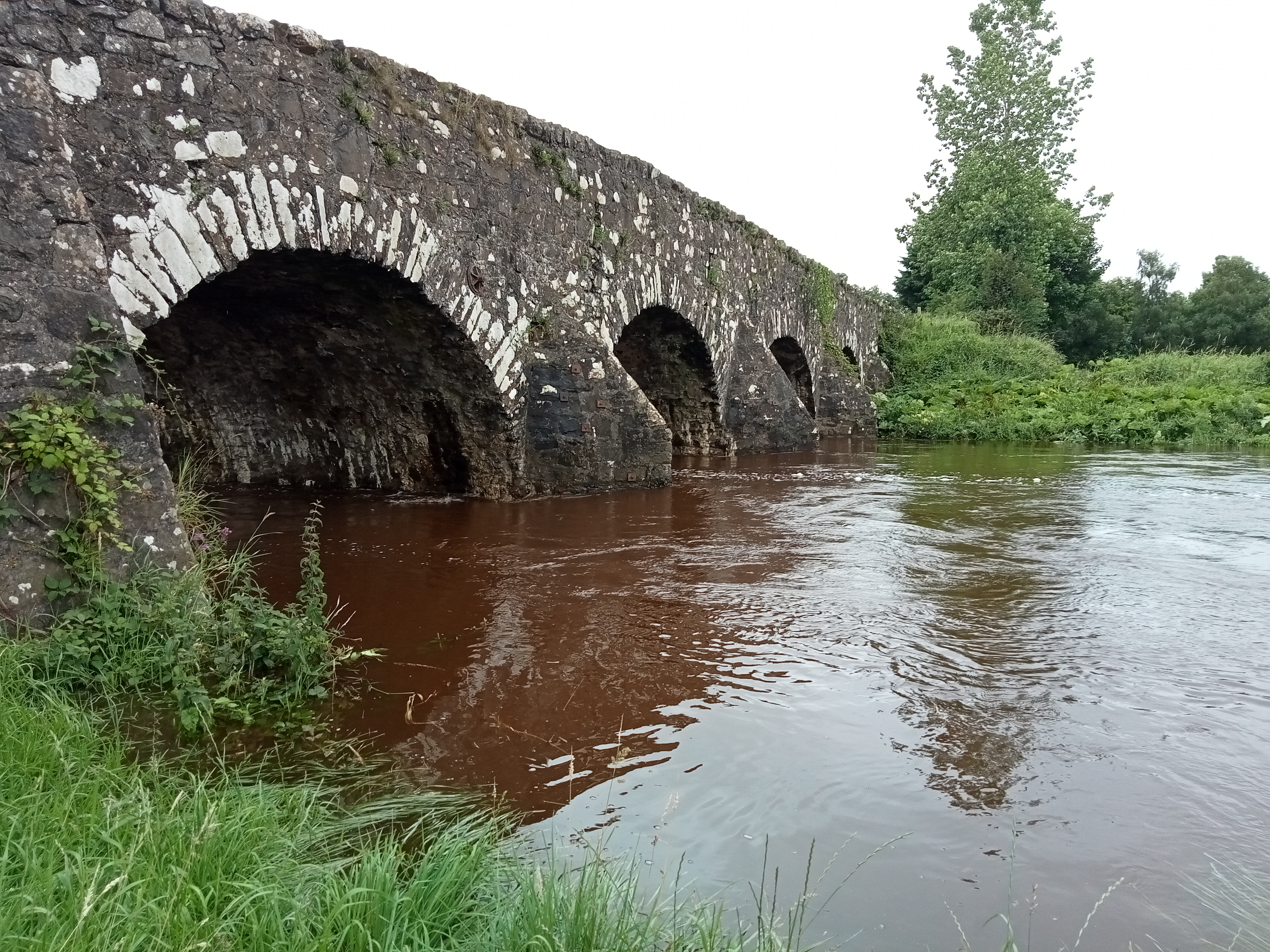
Moyola In Flood Curran Bridge

== Mentions in literature ==
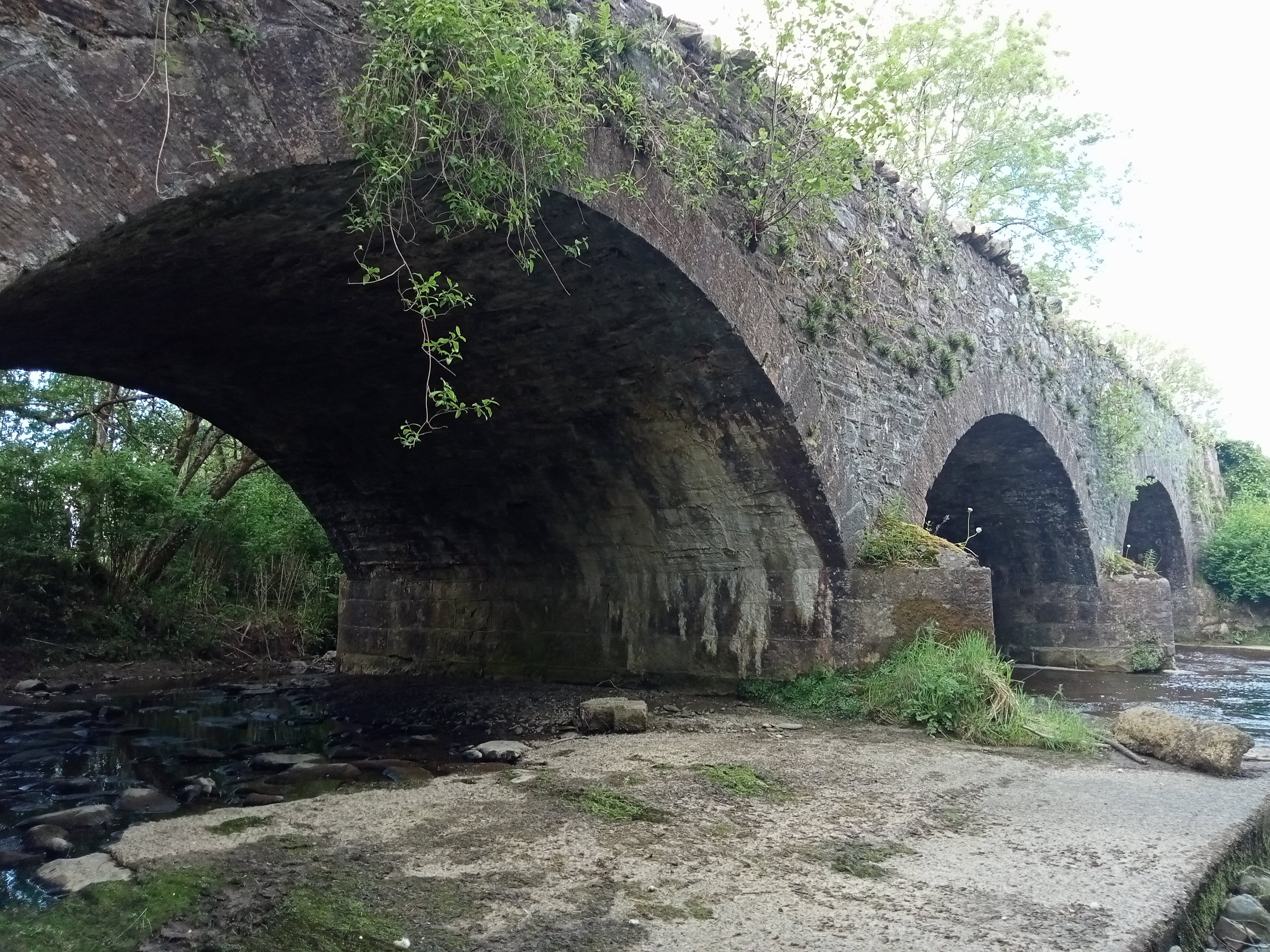
Owenreagh Bridge Near Straw

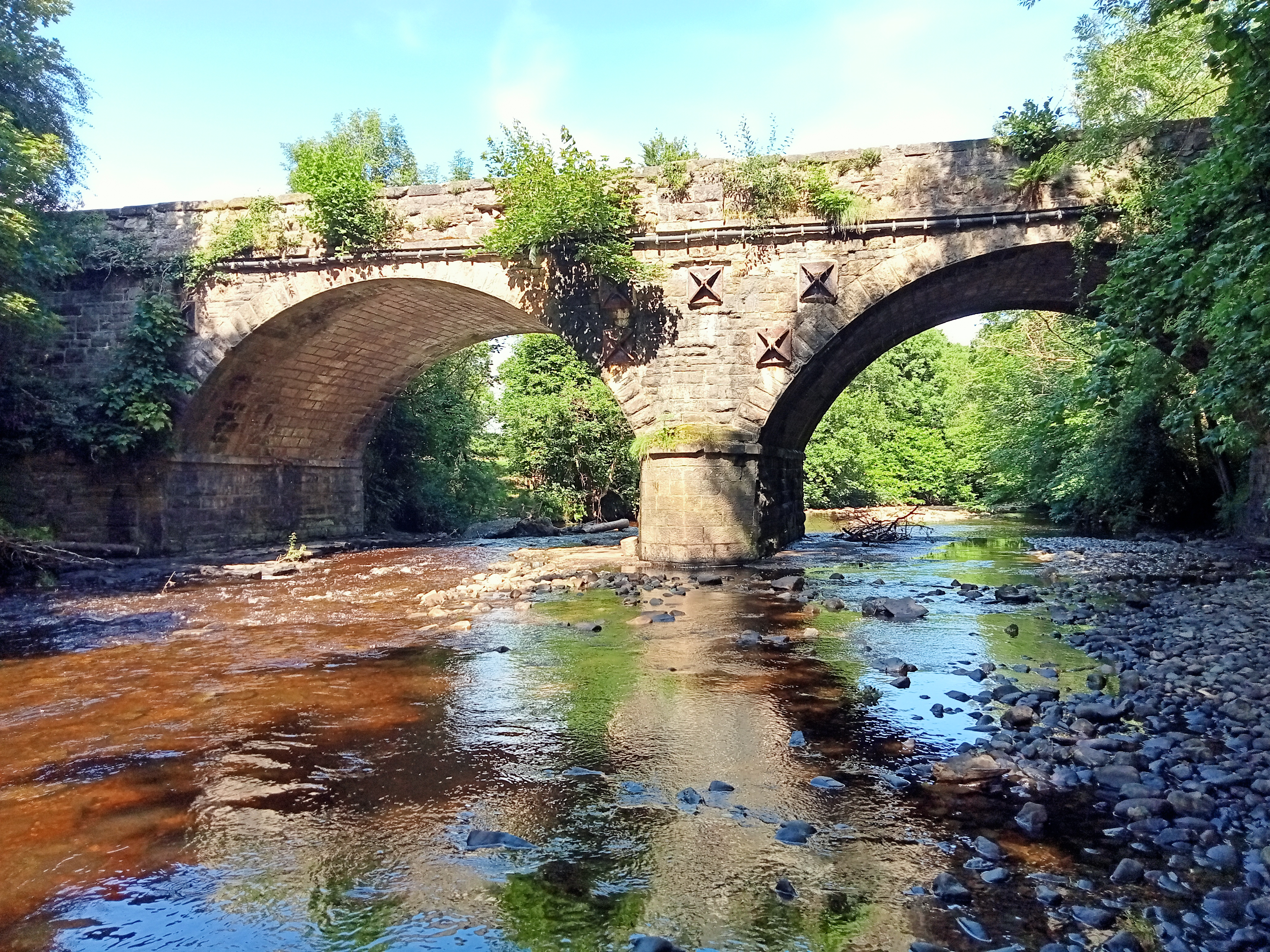
Derrynoyd Bridge, The Big Bridge Near Draperstown

The river is mentioned frequently in the poetry of Seamus Heaney, such as Gifts of Rain and A New Song, Whitby-sur-Moyola and Moyulla. Critic Daniel Tobin suggests that for Heaney his "childhood river, Moyola, is not unlike Wordsworth's Derwent."
