= Worshipful Company of Vintners =

Livery company of the City of London

Coordinates: 51.51015°N 0.09406°W

The Vintners' Company arms (blazoned): Sable a Chevron between three Tuns Argent

The Worshipful Company of Vintners, one of the Great Twelve City Livery Companies, retains close links with the wine trade. It traces its origins to the 12th century and received its swan rights from King Edward IV. Its motto is Vinum Exhilarat Animum, Latin for "Wine cheers the Spirit".

== History and origins ==
The vintners of London formed a guild as early as the twelfth century and received their first royal charter in 1363. This granted far-reaching powers including duties of search throughout English dominions and the right to buy herrings and cloth to sell to the Gascons.

This royal charter effectively granted a monopoly over wine imports from Gascony, securing the Company pre-eminence in the wine trade. Ranked eleventh in 1515 when the order of precedence of City Livery Companies was established by King Henry VIII, Queen Mary revoked the Company's rights in 1553. Its privileges removed under the Stuarts were restored by William and Mary, but the Company could not recover its former trading dominance in Europe. By 1725 few wine merchants were joining the livery, so the Company finally abandoned claim to the duty of search.

Until 2006, the Vintners' Company retained autonomous alcohol sale licensing rights in certain areas of England, such as the City of London and along the route of the old Great North Road. Its ancient rights being abolished, limited privileges remain to the livery.

Actively engaged in wine trade education, including the prestigious Master of Wine qualification, the Vintners' Company supports many charities, including those helping to treat the effects of alcohol and drug abuse. In modern times, the Company received criticism for opaque management of its annual budget.

== Vintners' Hall ==
Vinters' Hall is situated in Vintry Ward, London EC4 on Upper Thames Street in the City of London. Dating from 1671 very little of its original 17th-century façade remains. Re-faced in the 19th and 20th centuries, the building includes a suite of rooms, including the main dining hall, court and drawing rooms plus a boardroom. Its cellar (aka Red Cellar) houses a collection of over 16,000 bottles.

The Company's livery elects a new Master annually in July, celebrated by a publication service at the Guild church of St James Garlickhythe, opposite the livery hall. This historic procession starts at Vintners' Hall with the Master and Wardens robed in Tudor dress carrying nosegays, their ceremonial path being swept by a Wine Porter using a birch broom.

Sir Lionel Denny, is the most recent Vintner to serve as Lord Mayor of London, and elected Master Vintner for 2025/26 is Richard Wilson MBE DL.

Every region of France is usually represented at its award events, continuing the spirit of Entente Cordiale.

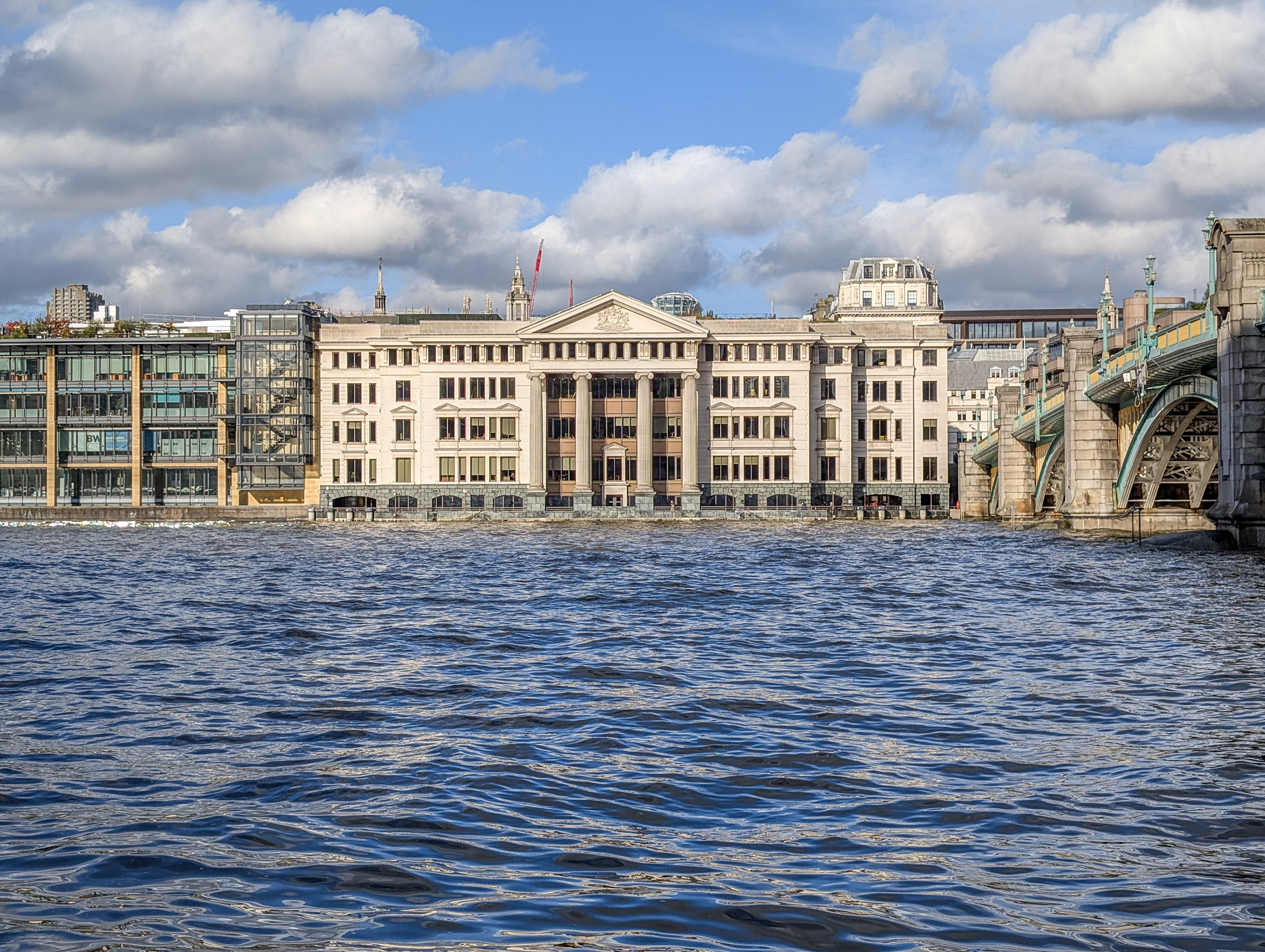
Vintners' Hall by the River Thames.

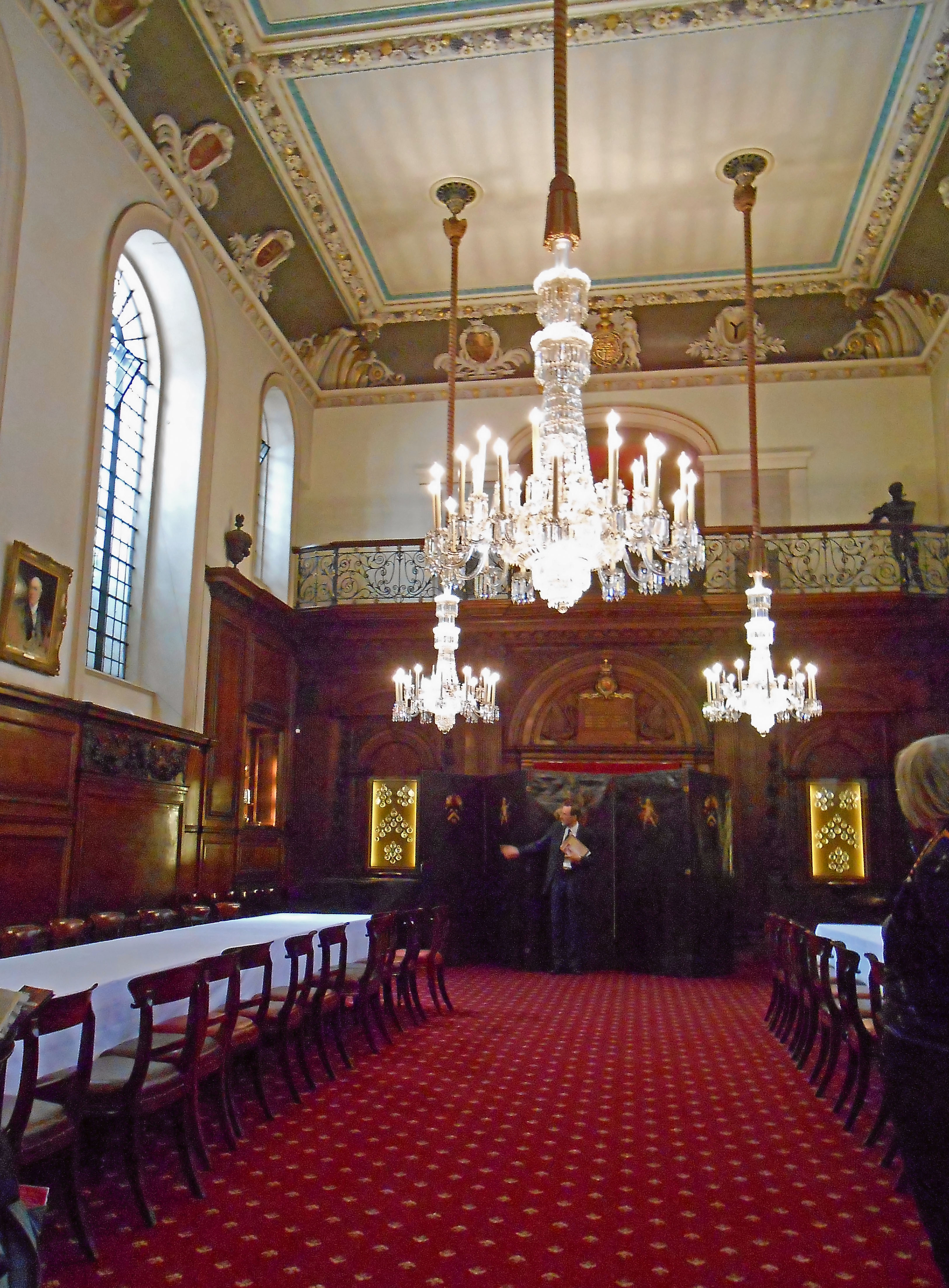
Vintners' dining hall.

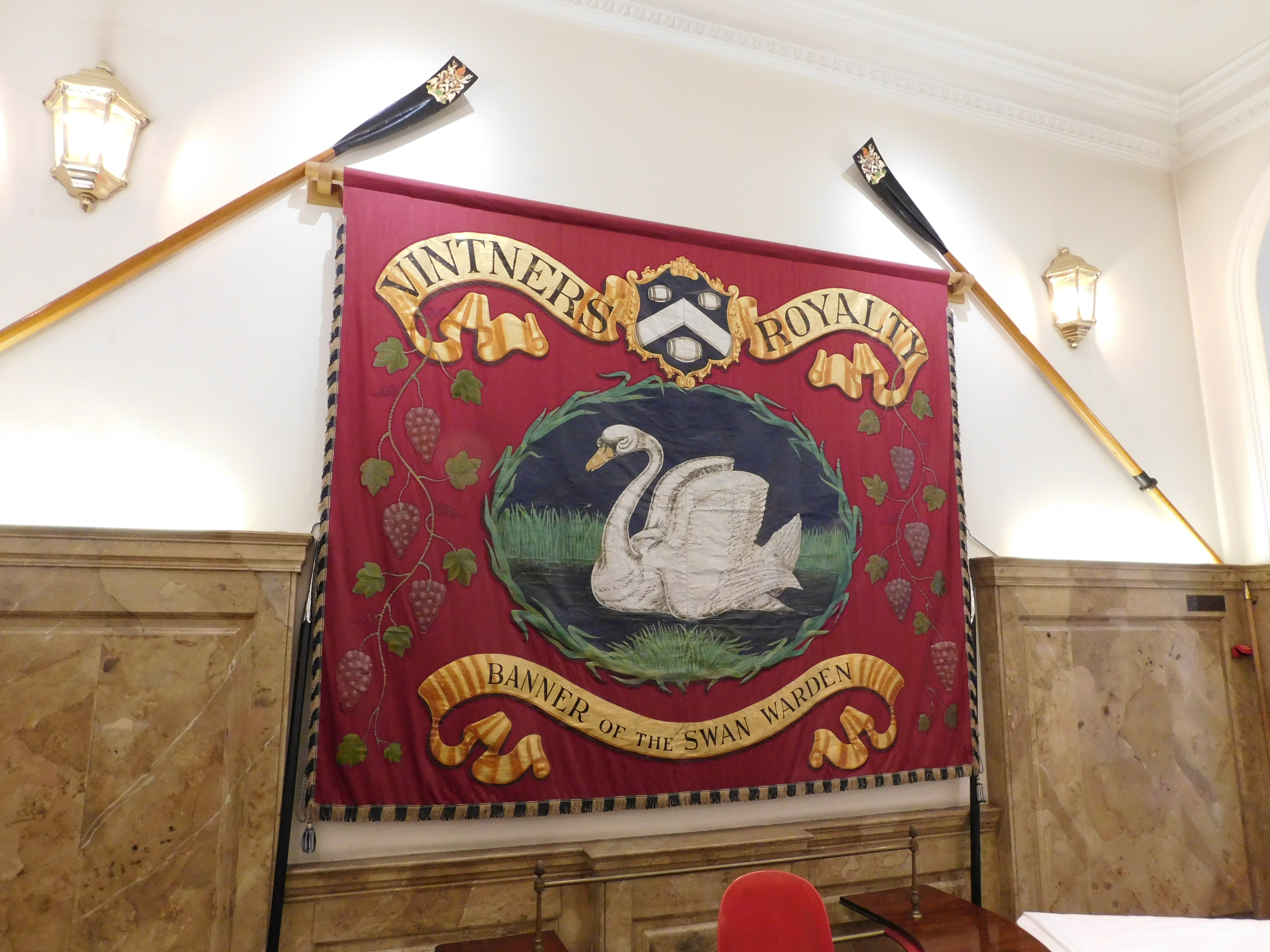
Swan Warden banner.

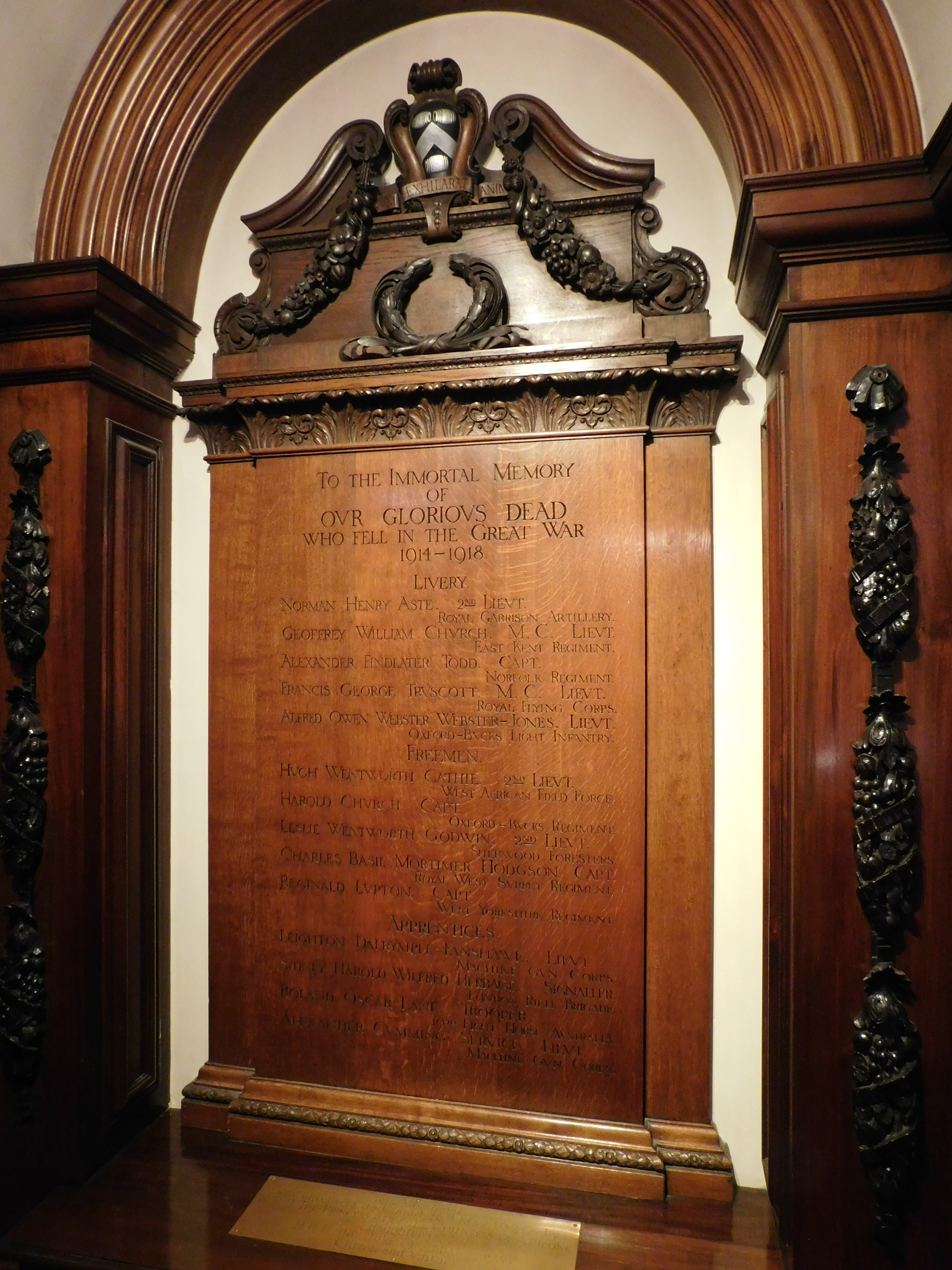
Vintners' WWI memorial.

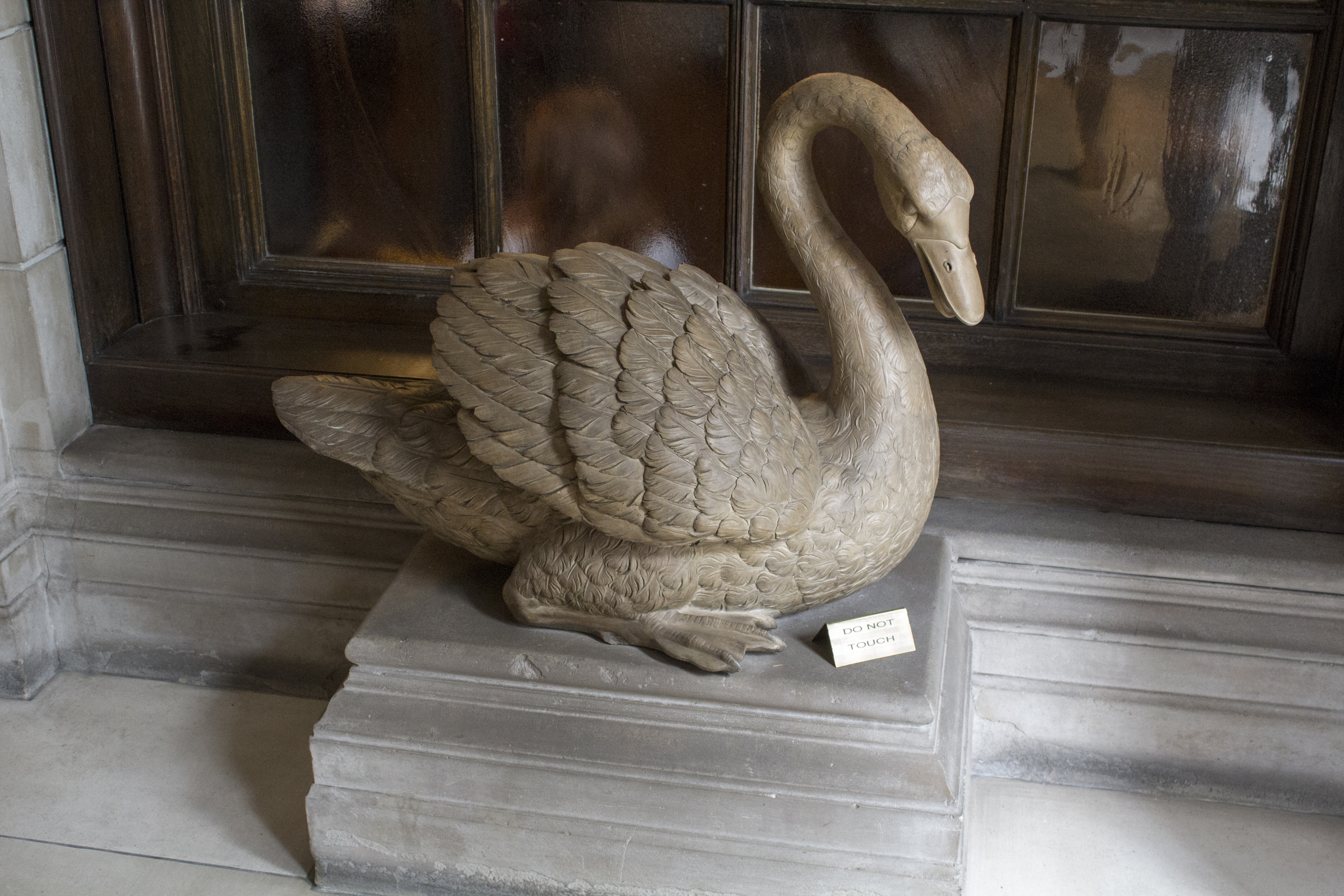
Vintners' Swan Statue.

== Swan upping ==
Since the reign of King Edward IV, the Vintners enjoy the peculiar right of swan upping, whereby swans on the Thames are apportioned between the Crown, the Vintners' and Dyers' Companies.

Vintners' swans are given two nicks to the beak (whereas the Dyers' have one): hence the Swan with Two Necks.

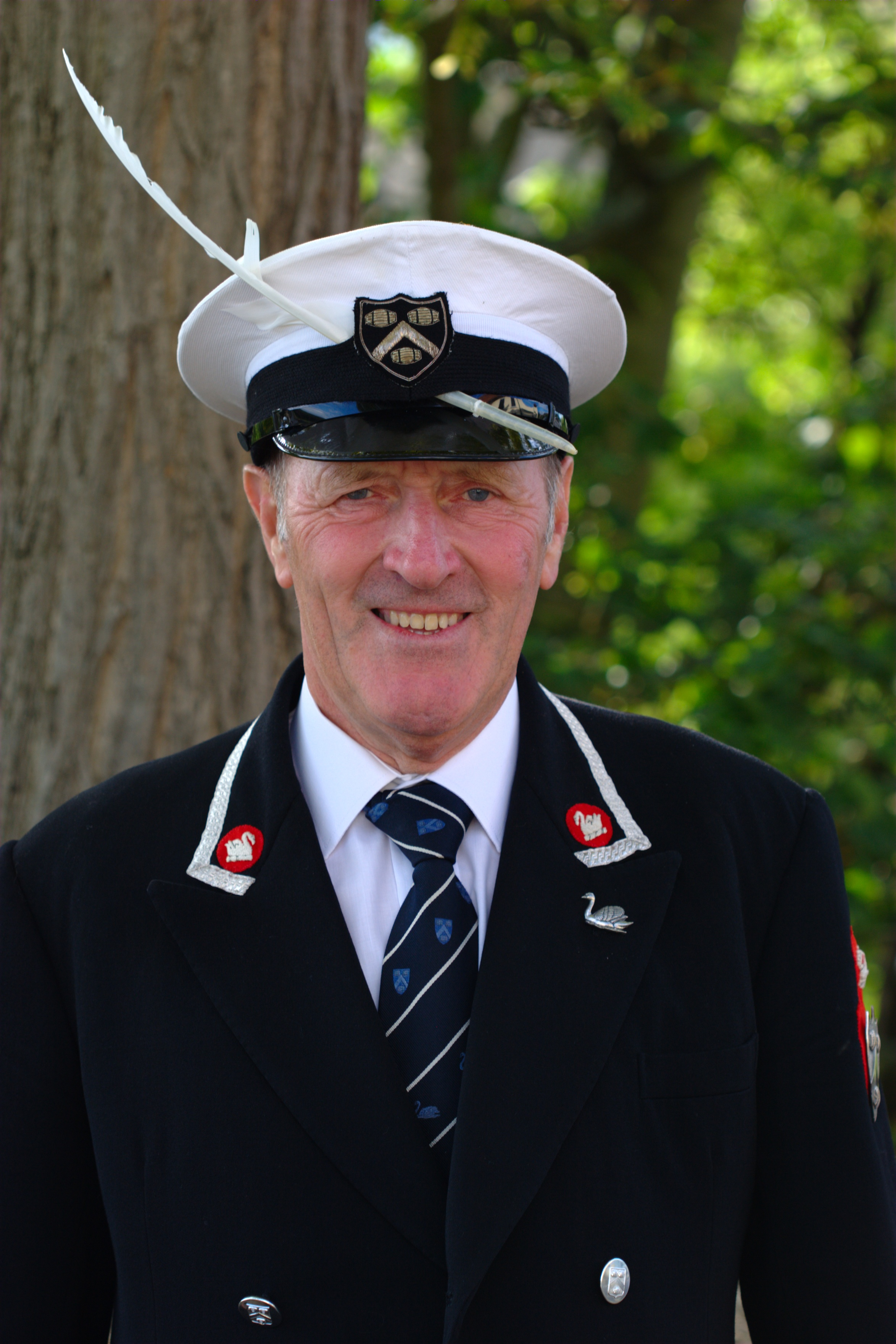
Vintners' Swan Marker, in blue uniform, during annual Swan Upping at Abingdon, summer 2011

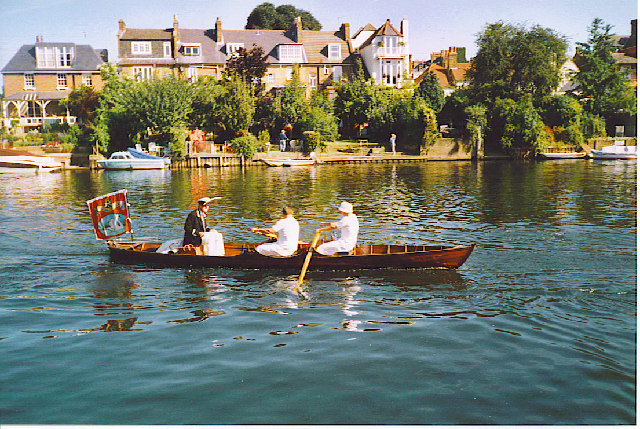
The Vintners at the start of Swan Upping, Sunbury 2004

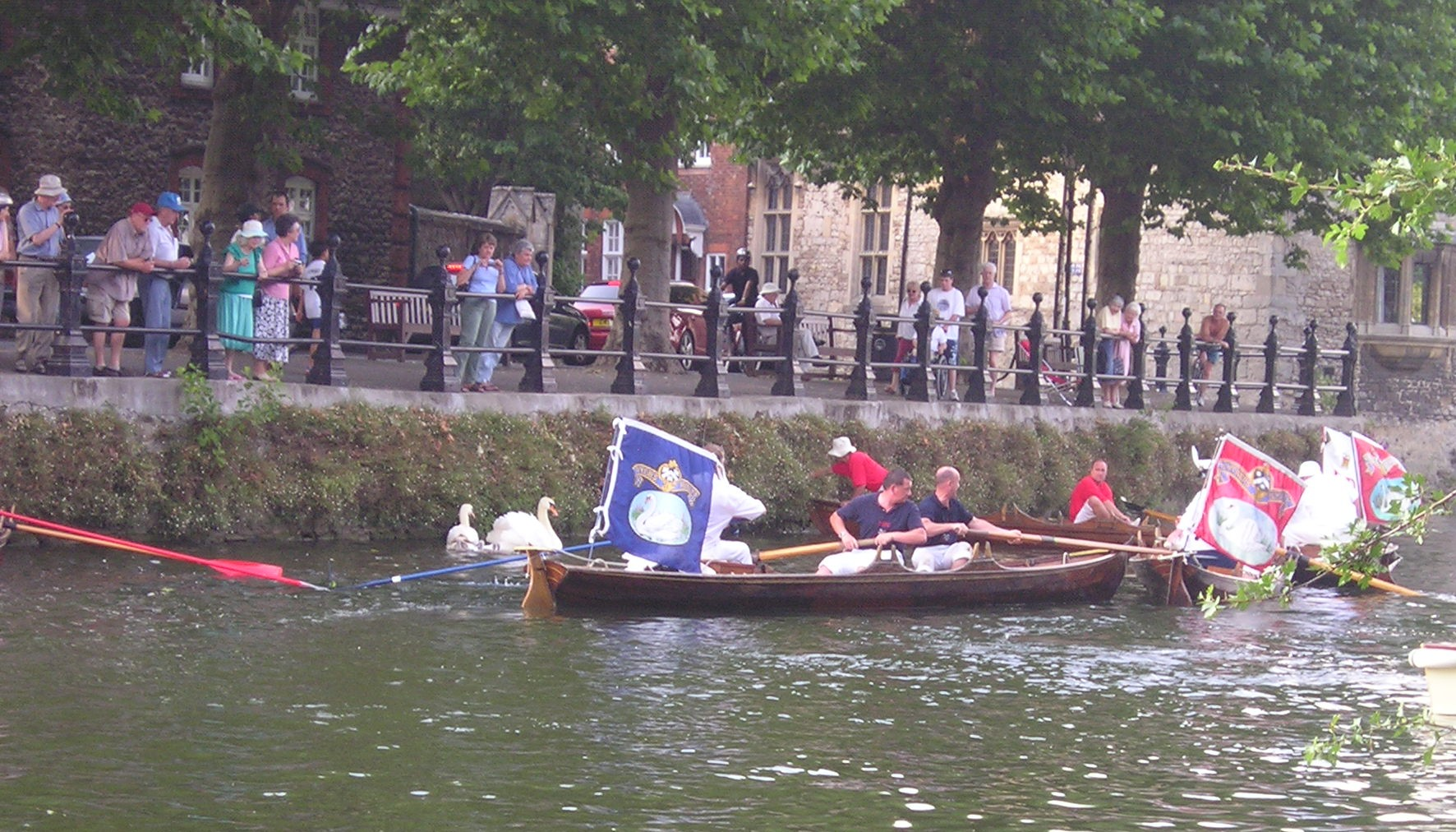
Royal (white flag, far right) and the Vintners' (red flag) and Dyers' (blue flag) Swan Uppers at Abingdon in 2006

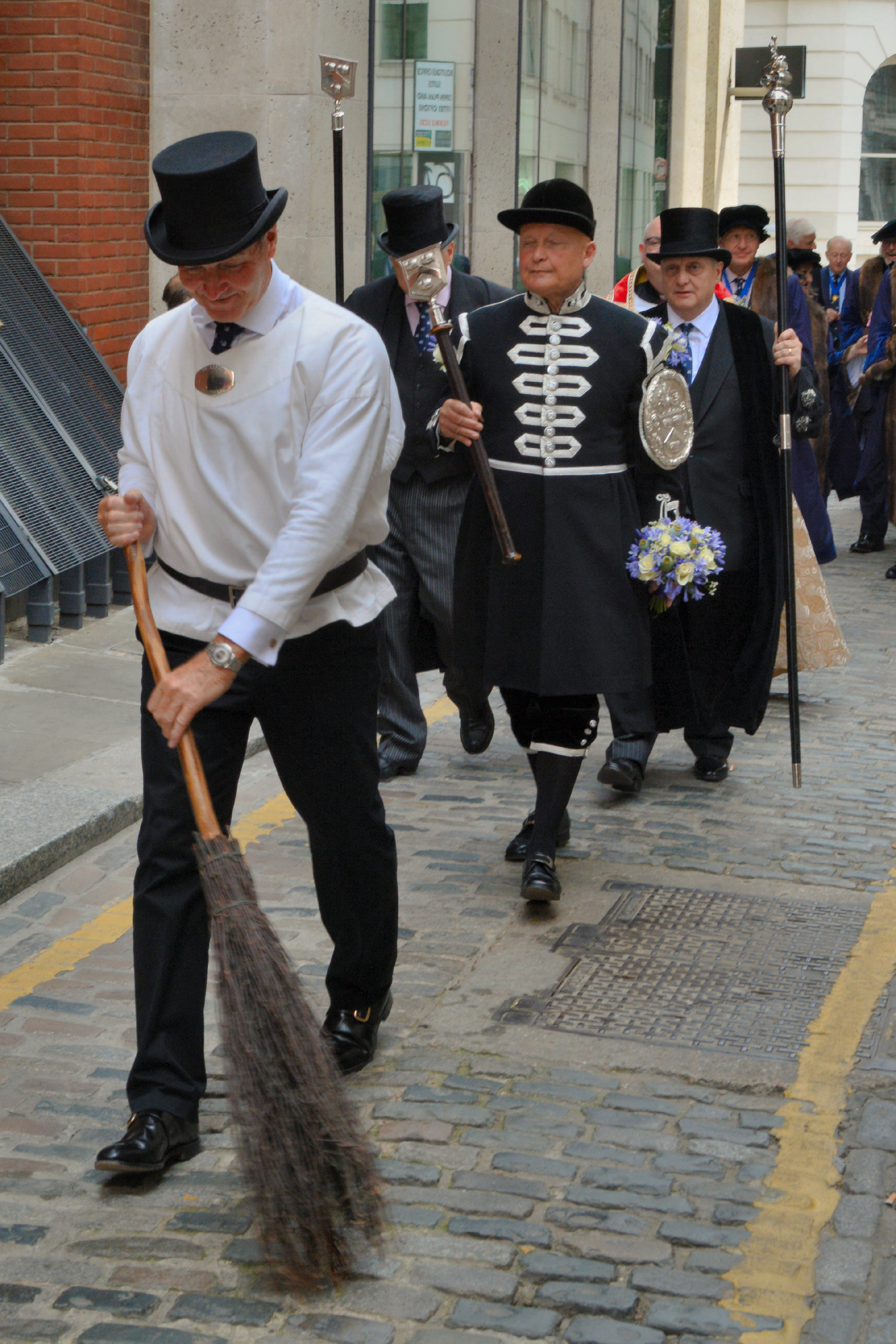
City ceremonial publication procession for the Master of the Worshipful Company of Vintners in 2019

=== Vintners' Hall in popular culture ===
- The music video of Liberty X's 2002 smash hit "Just a Little" was filmed at Vintners' Hall, featuring a gang of professional burglars (with two of its members, Jessica Taylor and Kelli Young, in tight black latex catsuits) stealing a diamond from the building's atrium.
- Vintners' Hall also features in Mimi Webb's 2022 music hit video "Ghost of You".

== See also ==
- Alderman William Abell
- Distillers' Company
- Master of Wine
- Confrérie des Chevaliers du Tastevin
