= Maghera (parish) =

- parish

Irish transcription(s)
  - Derivation: Machaire Rátha
  - Meaning: plain of the fort
- Sovereign state: United Kingdom
- Country: Northern Ireland
- County: Londonderry
- Barony: Loughinsholin
- Settlements: Culnady, Curran, Gulladuff, Maghera, and Upperlands

Maghera (from Irish Machaire Rátha 'plain of the fort') is a parish in County Londonderry, Northern Ireland. It is bordered by the parishes of Ballynascreen, Ballyscullion, Desertmartin, Dungiven, Kilcronaghan, Killelagh, Magherafelt, Tamlaght O'Crilly, and Termoneeny. As a civil parish it lies within the former barony of Loughinsholin and as an ecclesiastical parish it lies within the Church of Ireland Diocese of Derry and Raphoe.

== Name ==
The name Maghera is derived from the Irish Machaire Rátha meaning "plain of the fort", previously it was known as, Ráth Lúraigh, meaning "Lúrach's fort".

== History ==
Lúrach mac Cuanach is the 6th-century patron of the eccesliastical parish, with the local parish church, St. Lurachs, named after him. Lúrach's family held a degree of political importance in the area, with seven descendants of Lúrach's father Cuanu being kings of Airgíalla. Circumstantial evidence places their center of power at Ráth Lúraigh.

St. Lurach's church was plundered by Vikings in 832 according to the Annals of Ulster, and in 1135 was one of several churches burnt down. The ruins of the medieval church still stand in the town of Maghera in the townland of Largantogher, with the earliest remaining sections dating to the 12th century.

In 1111, the parish of Maghera was incorporated into the diocese of the Cinéal Eoghain, the seat of which was located at Ardstraw. In 1150 however the seat was transferred to Maghera, until 1254 when after complaints of its isolation from the "mainstream of civilisation" it was removed to Derry.

As a result of the Plantation of Ulster, the lands of the parish of Maghera were divided among three of the London livery companies, the Drapers, Mercers, and Vintners. A large portion of land around the modern settlement of Maghera was given over to the Established Church.

== Settlements ==
- Culnady
- Curran
- Maghera
- Gulladuff
- Upperlands

== Townlands ==
The ecclesiastical parish of Maghera consists of 38 townlands, however the civil parish consists of 37, with the townland of Upperland being omitted. Until the 1840s, Maghera ecclesiastical parish consisted of 42 townloads, when the townloads of Beagh Temporal, Culnagrew, Swatragh and Knockoneill were transferred to the neighbouring parish of Killelagh.

- Ballymacilcurr
- Ballymacpeake Upper
- Ballynacross
- Ballynahone Beg
- Beagh (Spiritual)
- Bracaghreilly
- Craigadick
- Craigmore
- Crew
- Culnady
- Curragh
- Curran
- Dreenan
- Drumard
- Drumconready
- Drumlamph
- Drummuck
- Dunglady
- Falgortrevy
- Fallagloon
- Gorteade
- Grillagh
- Gulladuff
- Keady
- Kirley
- Largantogher
- Lisnamuck
- Macknagh
- Moneymore
- Moyagall
- Rocktown
- Slaghtybogy
- Tamnymartin
- Tamnymullan
- Tirgarvil
- Tirnageeragh
- Toberhead

== See also ==
- Beagh
- List of civil parishes of County Londonderry
