= Maghera =

Town in County Londonderry, Northern Ireland

Coordinates: 54.844°N 6.673°W

Maghera: Irish: Machaire Rátha; Scots: Machera
- Town
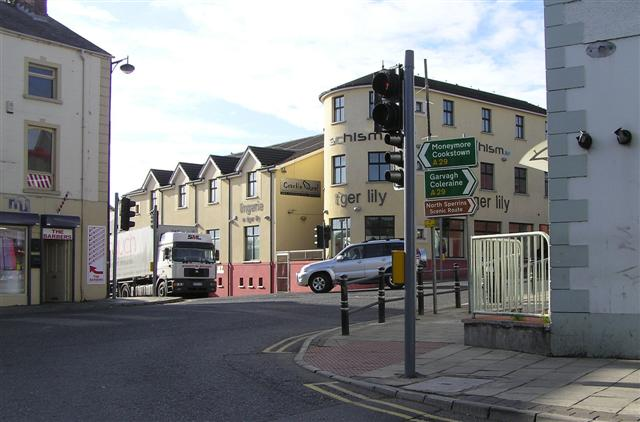
- Maghera Town Centre

- Location within Northern Ireland
- Population: 4,235 (2021 census)
- District: Mid-Ulster
- Country: Northern Ireland
- Sovereign state: United Kingdom
- Post town: MAGHERA
- Postcode district: BT46
- Dialling code: 028
- Police: Northern Ireland
- Fire: Northern Ireland
- Ambulance: Northern Ireland
- UK Parliament: Mid-Ulster
- NI Assembly: Mid-Ulster

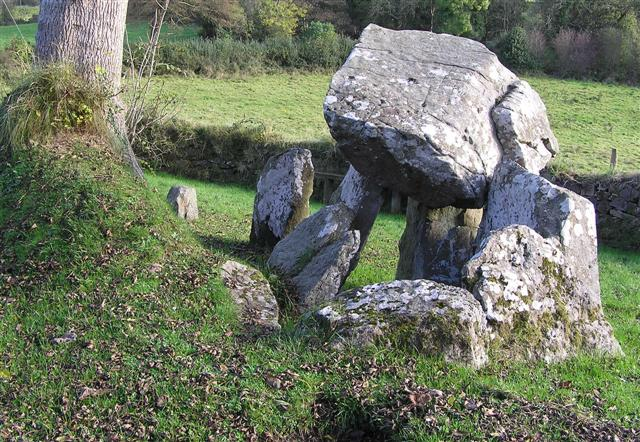
Tirnony Dolmen

Maghera (/ˌmæhəˈrɑː, ˌmækəˈrɑː/ MA-hə-RAH, MAK-ə-RAH; from Irish Machaire Rátha, meaning 'plain of the ringfort') is a town at the foot of the Glenshane Pass in Northern Ireland. Its population was 4,235 in the 2021 census. Formerly in the barony of Loughinsholin within the historic County Londonderry, it is today in the local-government district of Mid-Ulster. The Milltown and Back Burn Rivers both converge outside the town to form the Mullagh River which flows into the Moyola River

== History ==
Dated archaeological evidence of human settlement in the area runs from the Mesolithic. A single-chamber megalithic tomb known as Tirnony dolmen, thought to be between 4,000 to 8,000 years old, lies one mile north of the town. The town itself dates back at least to the 6th century to the church founded by Saint Lurach. Standing upon the site of the church, the earliest of the current ruins is the nave of Old Church which dates from the 10th century. . They include, over a doorway, a relief of the crucifixion, likely added in the 12th century, and possibly the oldest in Ireland. The crucifixion lintel is reproduced in the contemporary Catholic church, St Mary's.

The Old Church and town were burned in the 12th century. Afterwards, Maghera became the seat of the Bishop of Derry with a cathedral church. In 1246 its bishop, Germanus O'Carolan (Gilla in Choimded Ó Cerbailláin), pleading the remoteness of Maghera, obtained sanction from Pope Innocent IV to have the see transferred to Derry.

As a result of the Plantation of Ulster and of the Rebellion of 1641 which drove out many of the first English families, Maghera and district attracted Scottish settlers. They came into conflict not only with the dispossessed Irish, but as tenants and as Presbyterians also with the land-owning, Church of Ireland, Ascendancy. A result was large-scale emigration to the American colonies (Charles Thomson, recording himself as from Maghera, signed the Declaration of Independence) and, in the 1790s, the organising of the United Irishmen.

Despairing of reform, and determined to make common cause with their Catholic neighbours, on 7 June 1798 the United Irishmen mustered upwards of 5,000 men in Maghera. But the poorly armed host broke up the following morning on news of the rebel defeat at Antrim and the approach of government troops. A Presbyterian church elder, Watty Graham, was executed for his part, and his head was paraded through the town. His minister, John Glendy, was forced into American exile.

On 12 July 1830, Orange Order and Ribbonmen clashed over demonstrations the Orange Order held in Maghera and Castledawson. Several Catholic homes were burnt by Protestants in the aftermath. Some repair of sectarian relations was achieved by an active tenant right movement. In the 1850s, Samuel MacCurdy Greer was able twice on a platform of tenant right to face down Orange opposition in the county and secure cross-community support for his election to parliament. But by the end of the century, with tenant purchase of land facilitated by the Land Acts and with Irish self-government ("home rule") returned to the political agenda, the national question prevailed. Politically the town has remained split between nationalists, now in the majority, and unionists.

The Great Famine of the 1840s and the years that followed, resulted in a since unrecovered loss of population in the surrounding rural districts. In 2003 the Ancient Order of Hibernians erected a headstone to make the "Famine Plot" were local victims were buried.

In the early 20th century, the town itself was relatively prosperous. With its own railway station, an embroidery factory, a busy weekly market and close proximity to Clark's linen mill in Upperlands, it was one of two major towns within Magherafelt Rural District. The town also benefited from post-war advances in education, housing and transport. Separate primary and secondary schools were built for Catholics and Protestants in the 1960s; new housing estates were constructed and motor cars forced a widening of many of the town's narrow streets

Maghera suffered violence during the Troubles. Over the three decades from the end of the 1960s a total of 14 people were killed in or near the village Maghera, half of them members of the security forces and a further two as a result of family membership of the Ulster Defence Regiment. The Provisional Irish Republican Army were responsible for ten of the deaths. Two, including a Sinn Féin councillor, were killed by loyalist paramilitaries.

From what was possibly a low of 879 in 1910 Maghera population has risen in the course of a century to a census figure in 2021 of 4,235. Reflecting European Union employment in local food processing, 213 residents in 2011 did not have English as a first language.

In 2015, the Maghera Historical Society established a Heritage Centre at 11 Main Street. Intended as "an inclusive community facility", it is committed to embracing "all the different social, religious and political strands" which exist in the town.

== Governance ==
The village was administered by Londonderry County Council from 1899 until the abolition of county councils in Northern Ireland in 1973. Since 2011, the town is part of the Mid-Ulster District Council. It is located within the Carntogher district electoral area (DLE) which contains the areas Lower Glenshane, Swatragh, Tamlaght O'Crilly, Valley and Maghera. In the 2015 district elections, Carntogher DLE elected three Sinn Féin, one SDLP and one DUP representatives to the council.

== Amenities ==
On the east side of the town, on the grounds of Maghera Old Church, the original St. Lurach's, is a restored Victorian walled garden. Originally laid out in 1820, the current design was influenced by the "'wild' and informal approach" of the Irish gardener Wiliam Robinson (1838-1935).

Adjacent to the walled garden, and similarly connected to the town centre (Tobermore Rd.) by the Largantogher Walkway, are 13.26 hectares of land that, in 2026, have been approved for a wetland park. It is hoped that "the park will become a major asset for nature lovers and bird watchers alike".

The District Council runs a Leisure Centre on the Coleraine Road. There is a public library on Church Street.

== Churches ==
- Old St Lurach's Church, a church dating to the 10th century which has one of the oldest depictions of the crucifixion in Ireland.
- St Lurach's Church, which is the site of the local Church of Ireland congregation.
- St Mary's Catholic Church one of two catholic churches in the town.
- Maghera Presbyterian Church, which is a reformed church. The current building dates from at least 1843
- St Patrick's Church, Glen. The older Catholic Church on the outskirts of the town.
- Maghera Elim Church

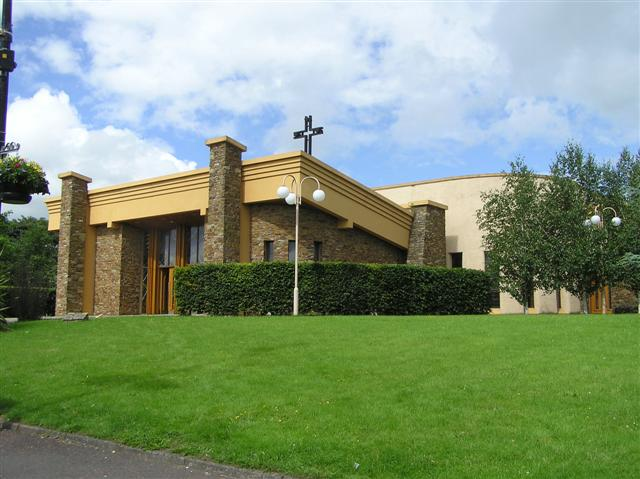
St. Mary's RC Church, Maghera

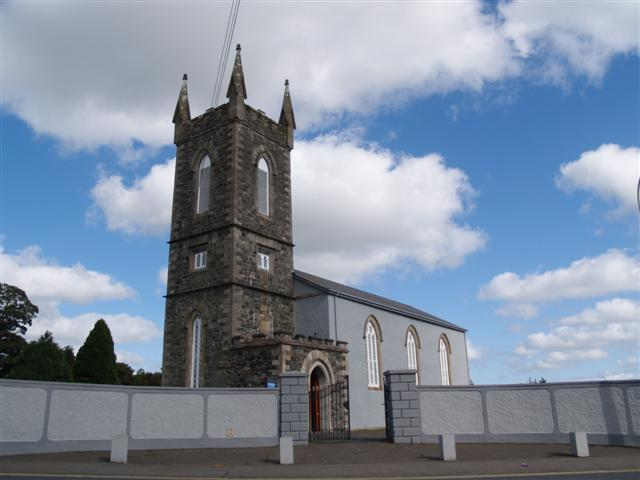
Maghera Church of Ireland

== Demographics ==
=== 2021 Census ===
On Census Day (21 March 2021) the usually resident population of Maghera (Mid Ulster Lgd) Settlement was 4,235. Of these:

- 22.57% were aged under 16, 61.94% were aged between 16 and 65, and 15.49% were aged 66 and over.
- 51.17% of the usually resident population were female, and 48.83% were male.
- 78.04% belong to or were brought up in the Catholic religion, 18.14% belong to or were brought up in a 'Protestant and Other Christian (including Christian related)' religion, 0.16% belong to or were brought up in an 'other' religion, and 3.66% did not belong to or weren't brought up with any religion.
- 19.24% indicated that they had a British national identity, 55.84% had an Irish national identity and 24.16% had a Northern Irish national identity. Respondents could select more than one nationality.
- 24.27% had some knowledge of Irish.
- 6.49% had some knowledge of Ulster-Scots.

=== 2011 Census ===
On Census Day (27 March 2011) the usually resident population of Maghera (Magherafelt Lgd) Settlement was 4,220 accounting for 0.23% of the NI total. increasing from 3,711 in the 2001 Census.

- 99.55% were from the white (including Irish Traveller) ethnic group.
- 74.86% belong to or were brought up in the Catholic religion and 22.61% belong to or were brought up in a 'Protestant and Other Christian (including Christian related)' religion.
- 22.56% indicated that they had a British national identity, 48.82% had an Irish national identity and 27.44% had a Northern Irish national identity.
- 21.23% had some knowledge of Irish
- 6.46% had some knowledge of Ulster-Scots
- 5.06% did not have English as their first language.

== Transport ==
The Northern Counties Committee's Derry Central Railway had a station in Maghera. Maghera railway station opened on 18 December 1880, shut for passenger traffic on 28 August 1950 and shut altogether on 1 October 1959 when the Ulster Transport Authority closed the Derry Central. The station building is now part of the Mid Ulster Garden Centre.

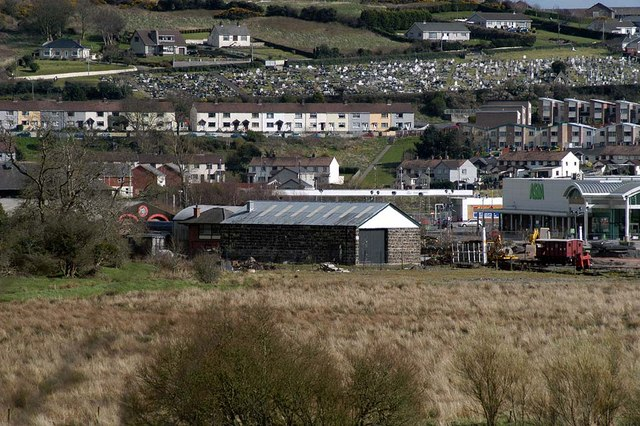
Maghera Goods Shed, now at Downpatrick railway station on the Downpatrick and County Down Railway.

Ulsterbus runs routes through Maghera, which includes the 116/a/b/d to Kilrea, Coleraine and Magherafelt, 212 from Belfast to Derry, 246 to Limavady and Eglinton and 278 from Monaghan to Portrush.

== Notable people ==
=== 1700s ===
- Charles Thomson (1729–1824), signatory to the U.S. Declaration of Independence, secretary of the Continental Congress.
- John Glendy (1755–1832), republican Presbyterian minister, in American exile twice elected to chaplaincies in the U.S. Congress
- Adam Clarke (1762–1832), Methodist theologian and bible scholar.
- Watty Graham (1768–1798), United Irishman, Colonel of the Maghera National Guard, executed in 1798.
- Henry Cooke (1788–1868), Presbyterian theologian and Moderator.

=== 1800s ===
- James Johnston Clark (1809–1891), Unionist MP for Londonderry, born at Largantogher House.
- Robert Hawthorne (1822–1879), Victoria Cross, assault on Delhi, Indian Rebellion of 1857
- William Shiels (1848–1904), Australian colonial politician and 16th Premier of Victoria.
- James Lenox-Conyngham Chichester-Clark (1884–1933), Unionist MP for South Londonderry in the House of Commons of Northern Ireland.
- Helena Concannon (1878–1952) Irish historian, writer, language scholar and Senator.
- Louis Joseph Walsh (1880–1942) solicitor, playwright, Sinn Féin politician.

=== 1900s ===
- Eve Bunting (1928–2023), American-based children's author and novelist.
- Erwin Gabathuler OBE FRS (1933–2016) particle physicist.
- John Kelly (1936–2007), founder member and a leader of the Provisional Irish Republican Army.
- Mickey Moran (1951– ) Gaelic footballer and manager-coach,
- Kenny Shiels (1956– ), footballer, Northern Ireland team manager.

== Schools ==
There are three primary schools and one secondary school in Maghera.

=== Primary schools ===
- St Mary's Primary School, Glenview
- Maghera Controlled Primary School
- St Patrick's Primary School, Glen

=== Secondary school ===
- St. Patrick's College, a co-educational college.

== Sport ==
- The local Gaelic football club is Watty Graham's Gaelic Athletic Club (Glen) who won the 2023–24 All-Ireland Senior Club Football Championship.
