= Calf Islands =

Island group in County Cork, Ireland

Coordinates: 51°28′48″N 9°30′09″W

Native name: Na Laonna
- Interactive map of Calf Islands

Geography
- Location: Roaringwater Bay
- Archipelago: Carbery's Hundred Isles
- Area: 204 acres (83 ha)

Administration
- Ireland
- Province: Munster
- County: County Cork

Demographics
- Population: 0

The Calf Islands (Irish: Na Laonna) are a group of three islands in Roaringwater Bay, off the coast of West Cork, Ireland. Forming part of Carbery's Hundred Isles, the group consists of East Calf Island, Middle Calf Island and West Calf Island. The islands lie between the mainland near Schull and Cape Clear Island.

== Geography ==
The islands are situated in the outer reaches of Roaringwater Bay, a large natural harbour on the south-west coast of County Cork. Collectively they comprise approximately 200 acres (80 ha), with West Calf being the largest of the three islands at approximately 77 acres. Middle Calf and East Calf each cover approximately 60 acres.

The islands are characterised by low cliffs, maritime grassland, heath and rocky shorelines typical of the islands of Roaringwater Bay.

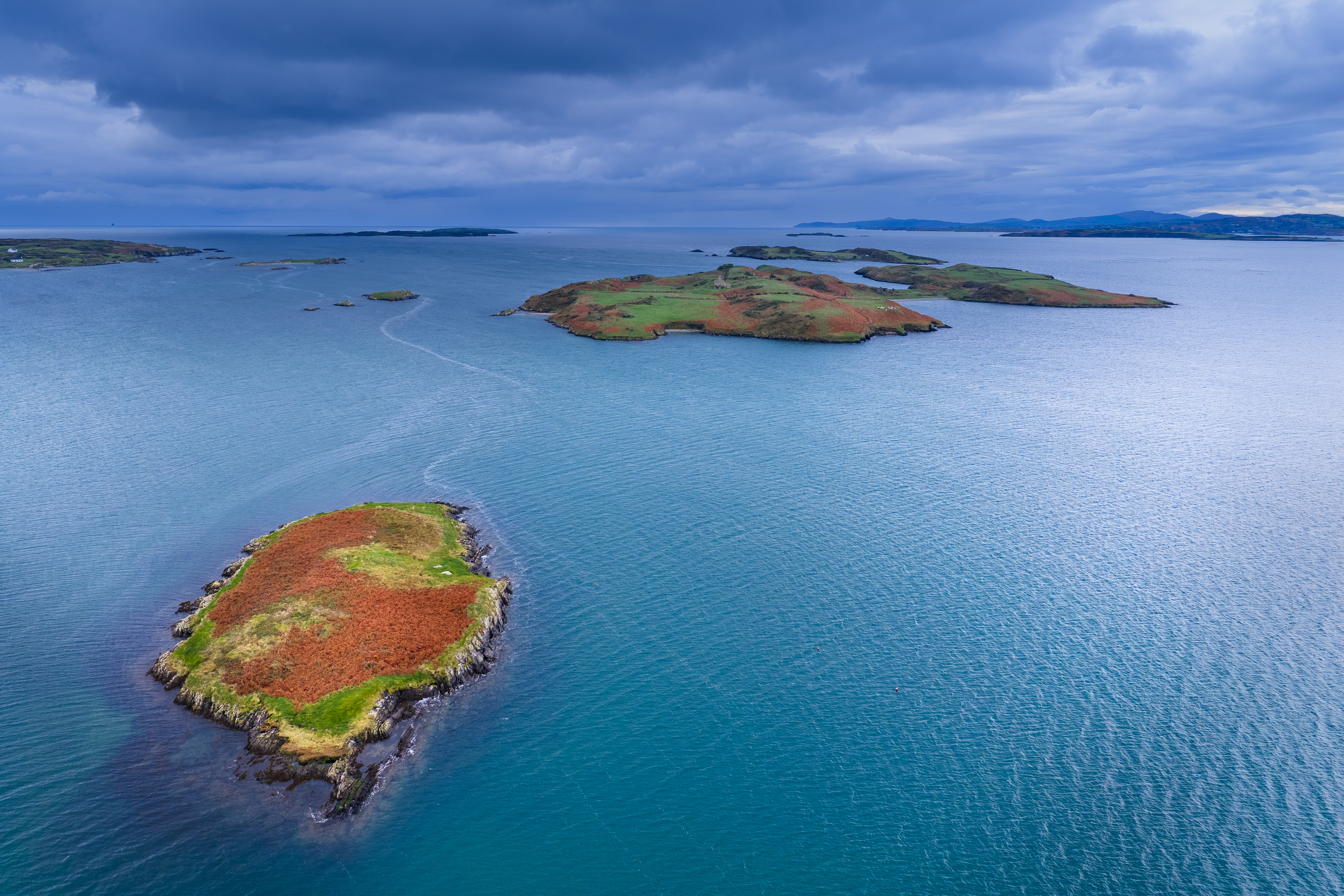
East view of Goose Island, with Skeam islands further up and right, part of Heir island on the left, and Calf islands close to the horizon, left off center

== History ==
The Calf Islands were inhabited for centuries and supported small farming and fishing communities. During the nineteenth century each island had a resident population. Census records indicate populations of 39 on Middle Calf, 21 on West Calf and 19 on East Calf in 1841.

The islands experienced significant depopulation during the late nineteenth and early twentieth centuries, reflecting wider demographic trends affecting offshore islands around Ireland. Middle and West Calf became uninhabited first, while East Calf retained a small population into the twentieth century and remained occupied until the 1940s.

Today the islands are uninhabited. Archaeological and vernacular remains include ruined houses, agricultural outbuildings, stone field boundaries and cultivation systems. Several former dwellings survive on Middle Calf Island.

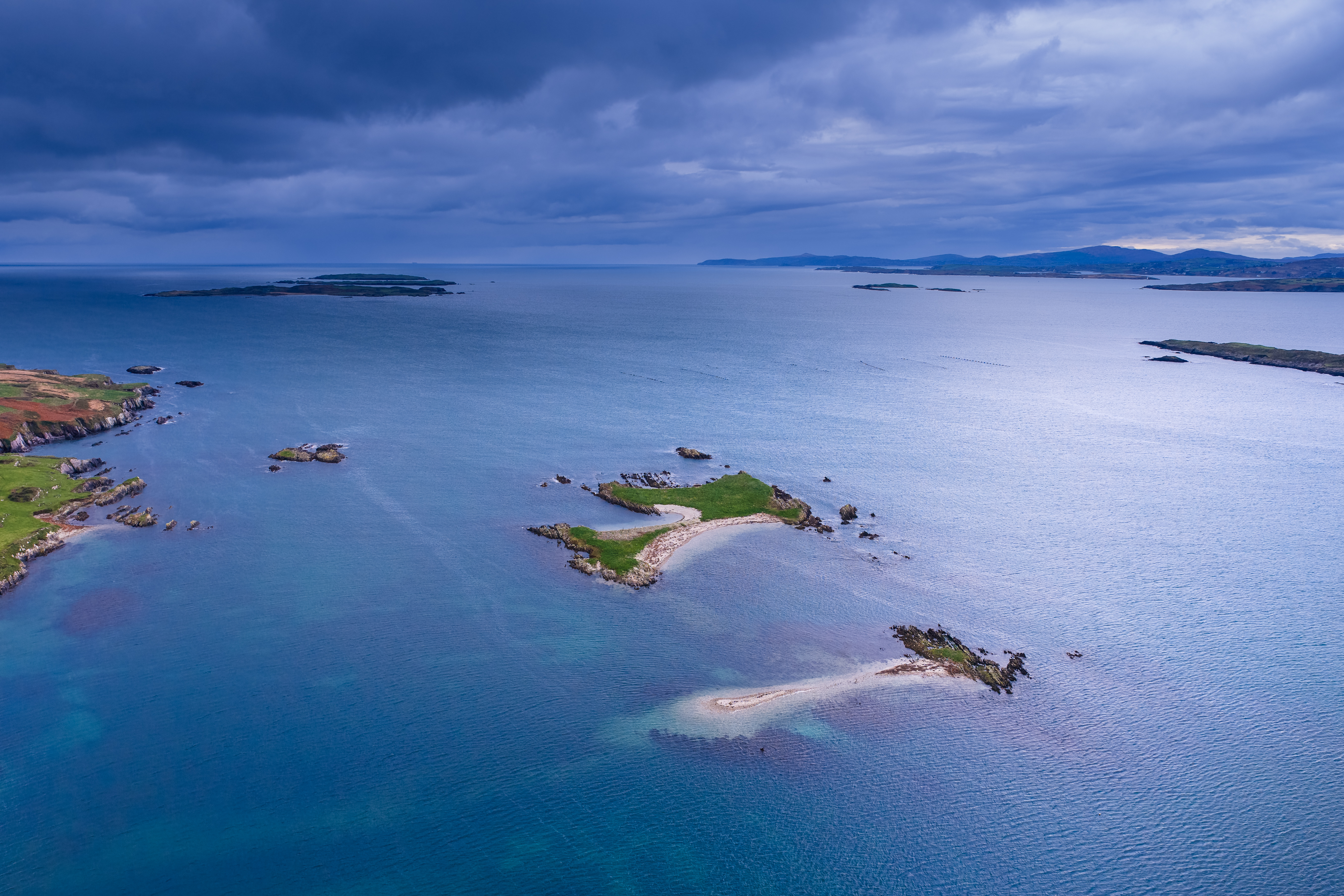
Illaunkearagh East (center bottom), Illaunkearagh West (further up), and part of Heir island (left). Further in the distance, Calf Islands (top left), Carthy's Islands (small archipelago off the top center of the image), Long Island (further behind it), Castle Island (top far right), Skeam West (center far right)

== Maritime history ==
The waters around the islands have been associated with a number of maritime incidents. On 10 November 1847, the emigrant ship Stephen Whitney was wrecked near West Calf Island with the loss of 92 lives, one of the most significant maritime disasters in the history of Roaringwater Bay. The loss of the ship triggered the decision to replace the Cape Clear Island lighthouse with one on Fastnet Rock.

== Natural environment ==
The islands form part of the wider ecological landscape of the Roaringwater Bay and Islands Special Area of Conservation, which supports a variety of protected habitats and species including harbour porpoise, grey seal and otter.

The relative absence of modern development has allowed extensive areas of maritime grassland and coastal heath to persist on the islands.

== Etymology ==
The Irish name Na Laonna translates as "The Calves". The term "calf" is commonly used in Irish and Norse-influenced coastal place-names to denote a smaller island situated close to a larger landmass.

== See also ==
- Roaringwater Bay
- Carbery's Hundred Isles
- Cape Clear Island
- Sherkin Island
- Horse Island, County Cork
- List of islands of Ireland
