= East Skeam Island =

Island in County Cork, Ireland

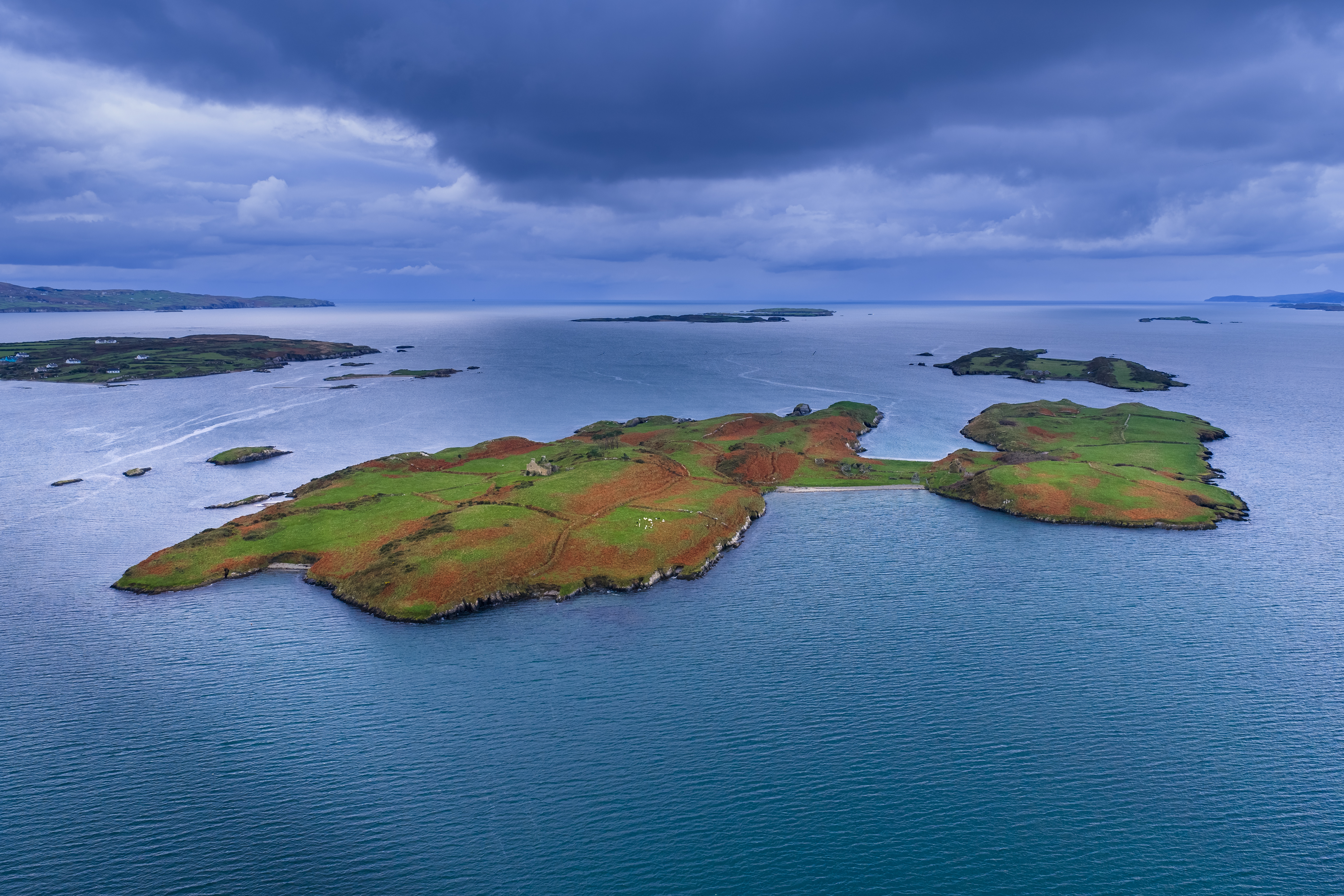
Skeam East island. Skeam West visible above it, to the right.

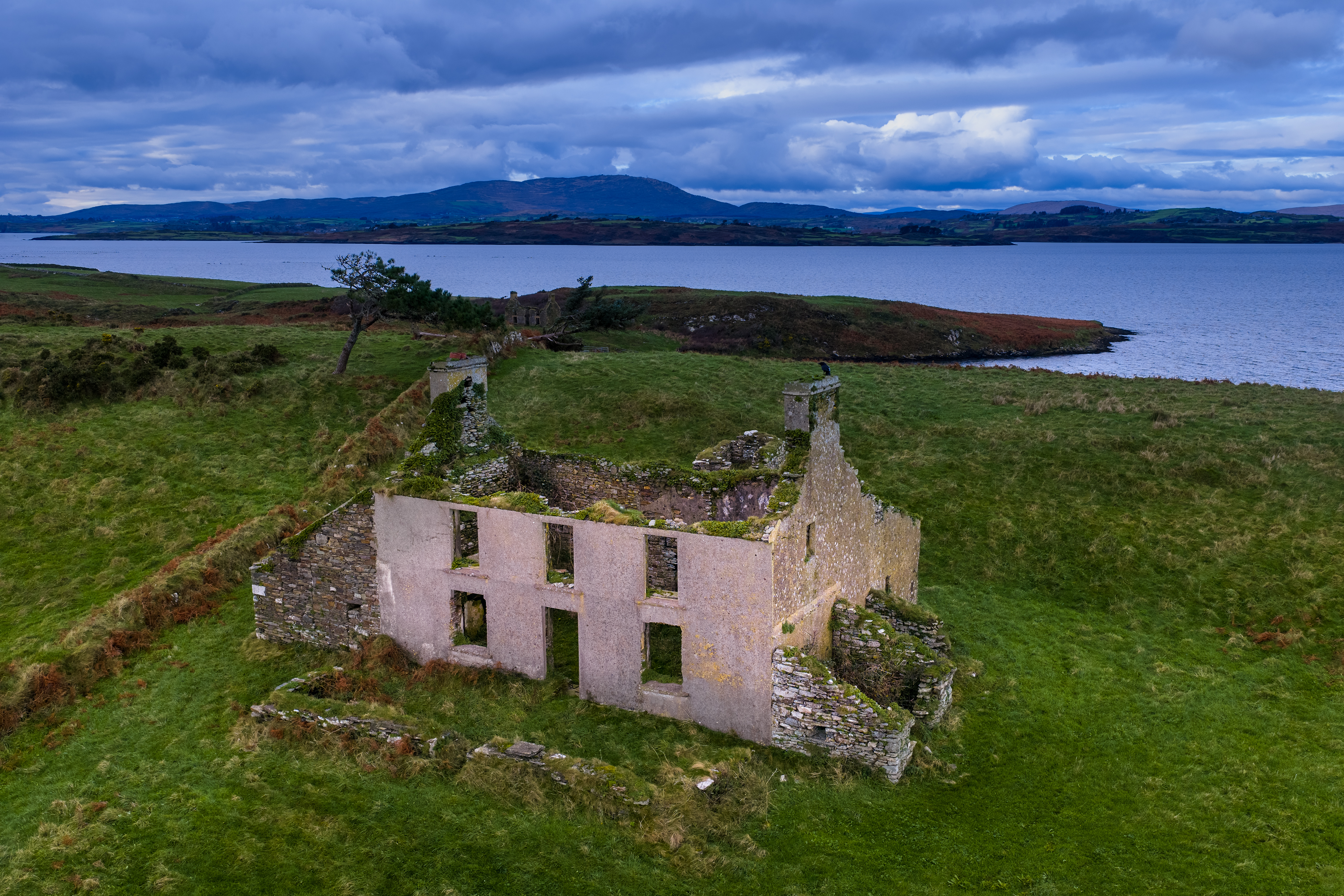
Ruins on Skeam East, view from the south

East Skeam Island (Irish: Inis Céime Thoir) is an island in Roaringwater Bay, County Cork, Munster, Ireland, that forms part of Carbery's Hundred Isles. It is situated at 51°30′30″N 9°26′48″W, North from Heir Island, East from West Skeam Island, West from Cunnamore Pier. It is currently uninhabited (see Demographics below).

== Demographics ==
Historical population

Year	Pop.	±%
1841	29	—
1851	27	−6.9%
1861	27	+0.0%
1871	20	−25.9%
1881	24	+20.0%
1891	20	−16.7%
1901	22	+10.0%
1911	27	+22.7%

Year	Pop.	±%
1926	11	−59.3%
1936	8	−27.3%
1946	8	+0.0%
1951	7	−12.5%
1956	7	+0.0%
1961	0	−100.0%
1966	0	0.00%
1971	0	0.00%

Year	Pop.	±%
1979	0	0.00%
1981	0	0.00%
1986	0	0.00%
1991	0	0.00%
1996	0	0.00%
2002	0	0.00%
2006	0	0.00%

Source: Central Statistics Office. "CNA17: Population by Off Shore Island, Sex and Year". CSO.ie.
