= Heir Island =

Island in County Cork, Ireland

Native name: Inis Uí Drisceoil Nickname: Inishodriscol / Hare Island
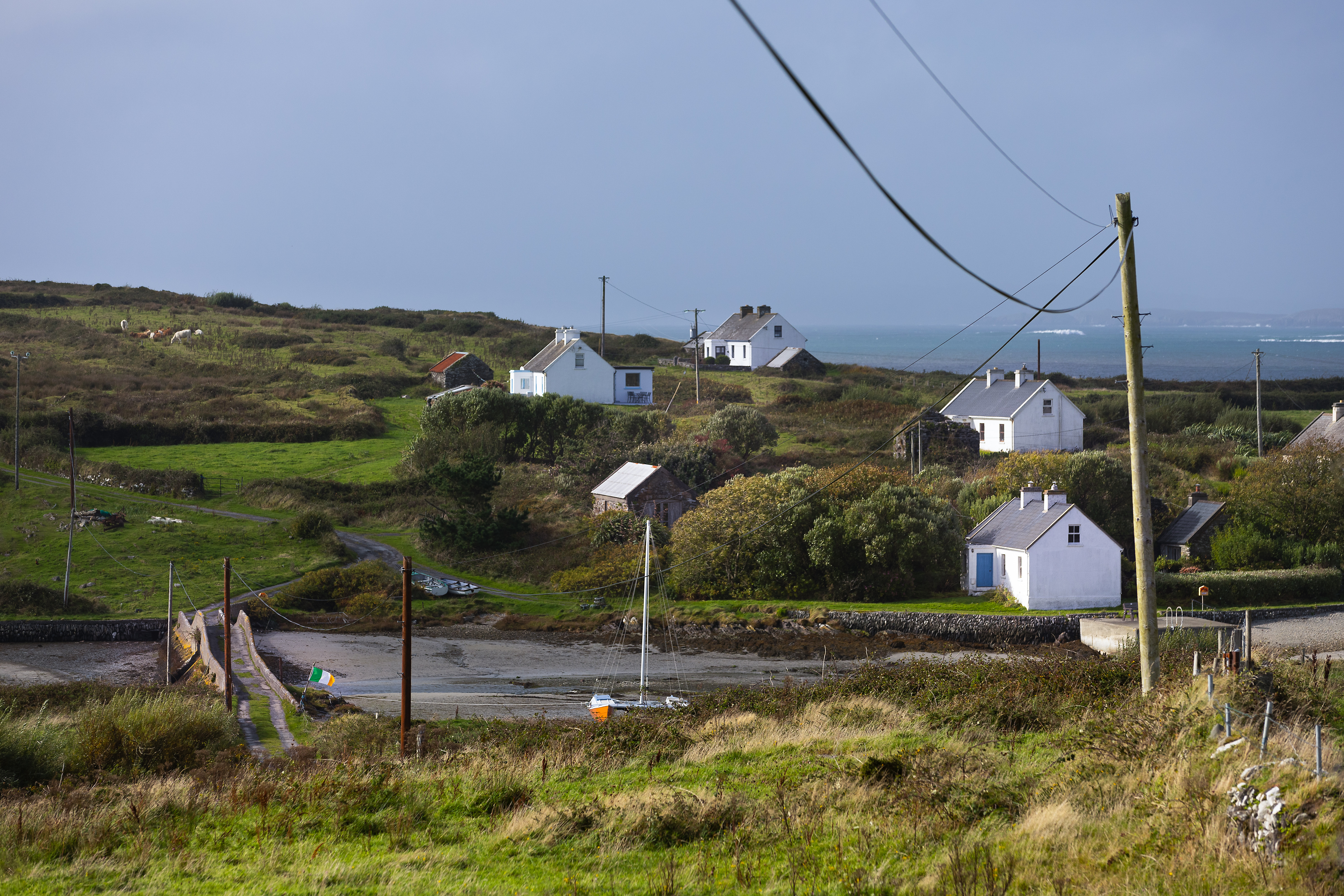
- Settlement in the island's center

- Location within island of Ireland

Geography
- Location: Carbery's Hundred Isles
- Coordinates: 51°30′N 9°26′W
- Area: 1.5 km^{2} (0.58 sq mi)

Administration
- Ireland
- Province: Munster
- County: Cork
- Barony: Carbery West

Demographics
- Population: 29 (2022)
- Pop. density: 20/km^{2} (50/sq mi)

Heir Island, also known as Hare Island or Inishodriscol (Irish: Inis Uí Drisceoil, meaning 'Ó Driscol's island'), is an island in southwest County Cork, Ireland. It has a year-round population of around 25–30. The island is 2.5 km long and 1.5 km wide. It is the fourth-largest of Carbery's Hundred Isles, after Sherkin Island, Clear Island and Long Island. It is near Cunnamore Pier, which is its main access point.

== History ==
The island was once inhabited by approximately 400 people. The McCarthy and O'Neill families are known for living on this island for years, the latter in fact owned the original island post office. To make a living on the Island the inhabitants either fished or farmed the land but were often unable to make an adequate living, as a result many of the young people emigrated to England, USA and Australia. There are still many descendants of the original islanders living and working on the island. As a result of the emigration, many of the houses were sold in the 1960s and those who bought them often restored the original houses as holiday homes which visitors can see dotted around the island.

Historical population

Year	Pop.	±%
1841	358	—
1851	288	−19.6%
1861	261	−9.4%
1871	279	+6.9%
1881	302	+8.2%
1891	325	+7.6%
1901	317	−2.5%
1911	294	−7.3%
1926	216	−26.5%

Year	Pop.	±%
1936	169	−21.8%
1946	143	−15.4%
1951	139	−2.8%
1956	116	−16.5%
1961	94	−19.0%
1966	78	−17.0%
1971	79	+1.3%
1979	54	−31.6%
1981	35	−35.2%

Year	Pop.	±%
1986	19	−45.7%
1991	22	+15.8%
1996	16	−27.3%
2002	27	+68.8%
2006	24	−11.1%
2011	22	−8.3%
2016	28	+27.3%
2022	29	+3.6%

Source: Central Statistics Office. "CNA17: Population by Off Shore Island, Sex and Year". CSO.ie.

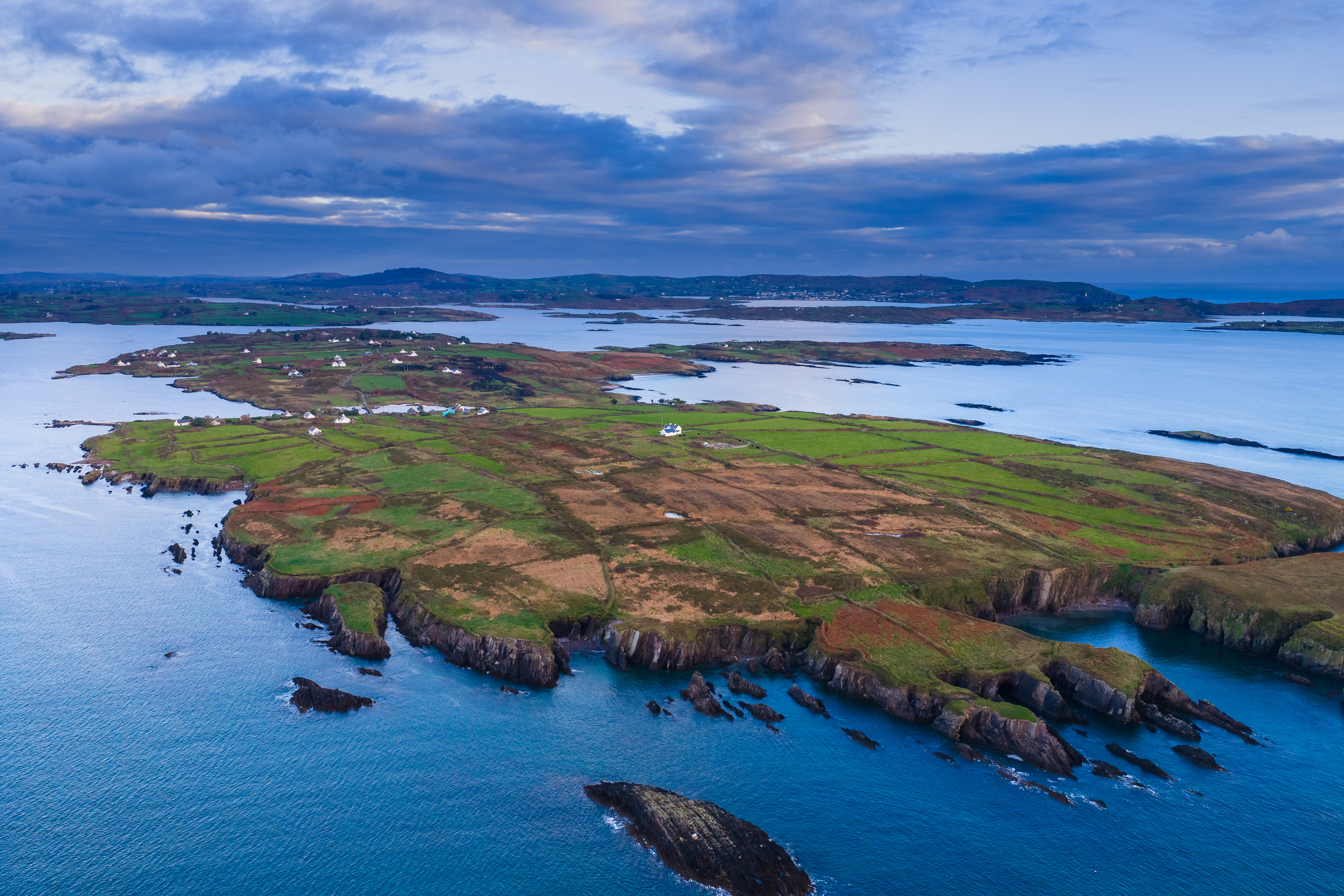
North-west aerial view

== Towelsail yawls ==
One of the trades of the islanders was lobster fishing, and before motorboats became common "towelsail yawls" were used for the fishing excursions. While not limited to fishermen of the island (lobster was harvested in the neighboring islands and bays too), it seems the heritage of this trade is nowadays mostly associated with Heir Island. Typically boats would be arranged in "trains" with multiple vessels connected by ropes, and they would be out on the sea for three weeks or more, with these excursions happening between early May and late August. Each boat would carry a train of thirty or so lobster pots made in winter of willow rods, with mackerel used as bait. The boats were approx. 25 ft to 28 ft long which made them light enough for rowing if needed, and they were a design with two masts, a gaff-rigged mainsail and foresail. One yawl carried a crew of three, and the only shelter the fishermen had was the teamhal sail (or teabhal); hence the anglicized name "towelsail". The canvas was spread in the shape of a tent at the bow of the boat. The men would cook simple meals for themselves using coal, turf and wood for fuel.

The fishing areas were expansive: lobster harvested in the north, up to Dursey Island, was sold in Baltimore; while the catch from the east, up to Ardmore, was sold in Cobh or Kinsale. The yawl fishermen would participate in Baltimore and Schull regattas which were important social events of the area. One of the last and well known towelsail yawl sailors, Jack Pyburn, died in 2005. Several of towelsail yawls, including one named Hanorah, have been restored and relaunched.

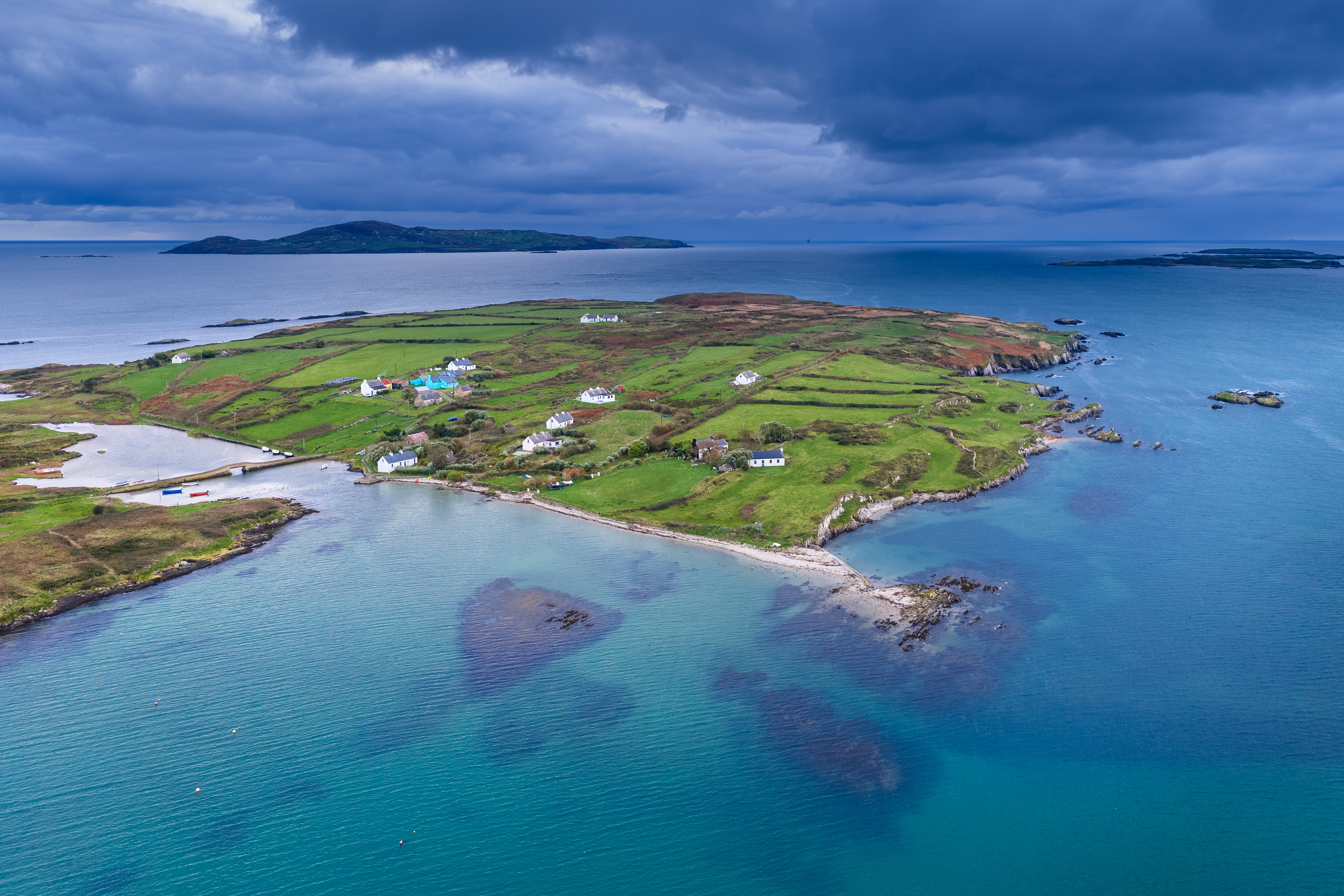
North-eastern view of the west part of the island

== Gort na Cille ==
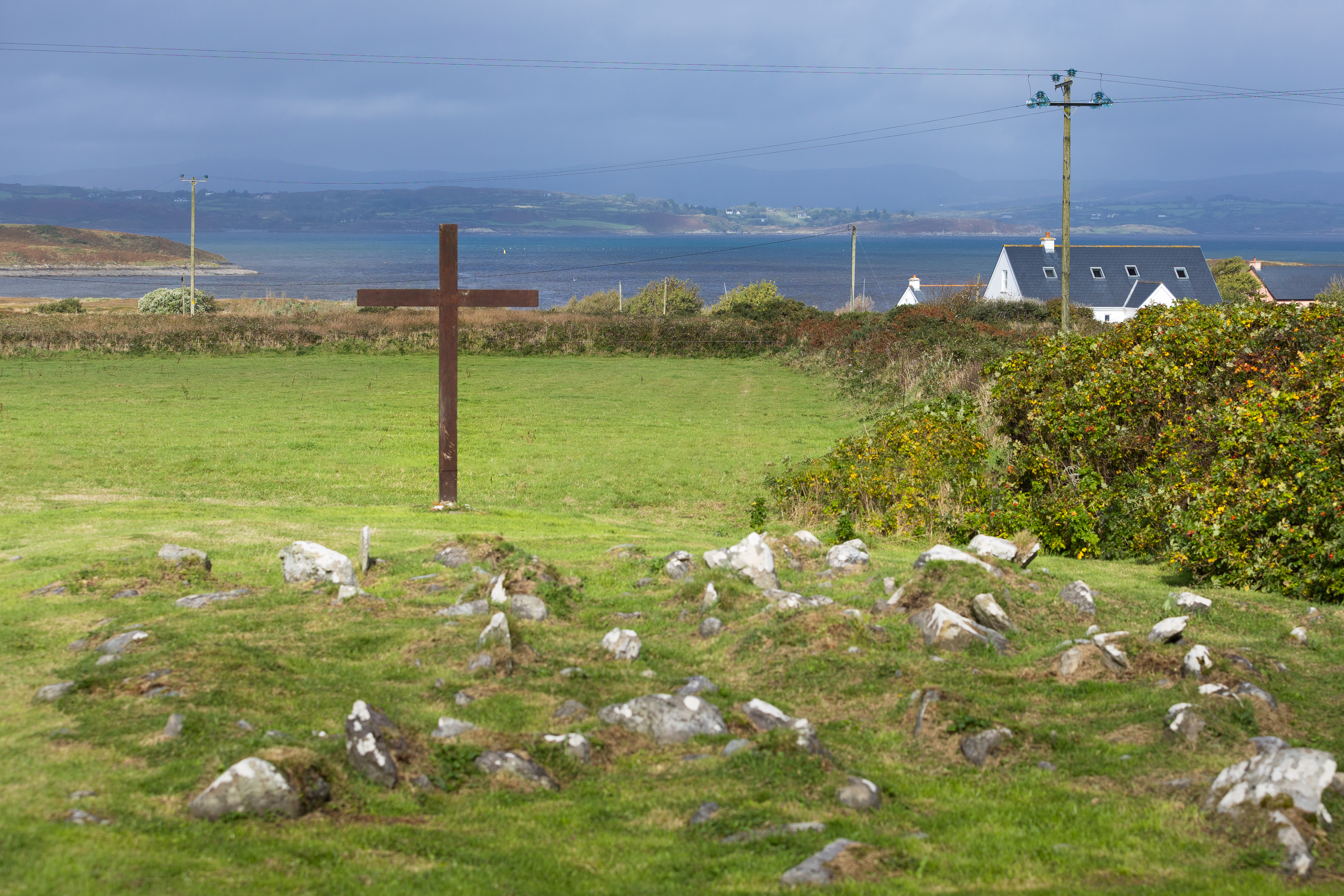
Gort na Cille

One of the fields in the central part of the island (Heir Island Middle), locally referred to as "Barry's Land", was a site of a cillín, that is a graveyard where unbaptised children were buried. It is called Gort na Cille, and since the consecration of the place in 2003 masses have been held there annually. There is a wooden cross erected by locals, and in 2013, on the 10th anniversary of the masses, a commemorative plaque was added on the side of the road.

== Amenities and infrastructure ==
There is a small hamlet on the island. This hamlet, the main residential area known as Paris, was once the centre of the island's fishing activities and the landing, pickling and barrelling of the day's catch was done there.

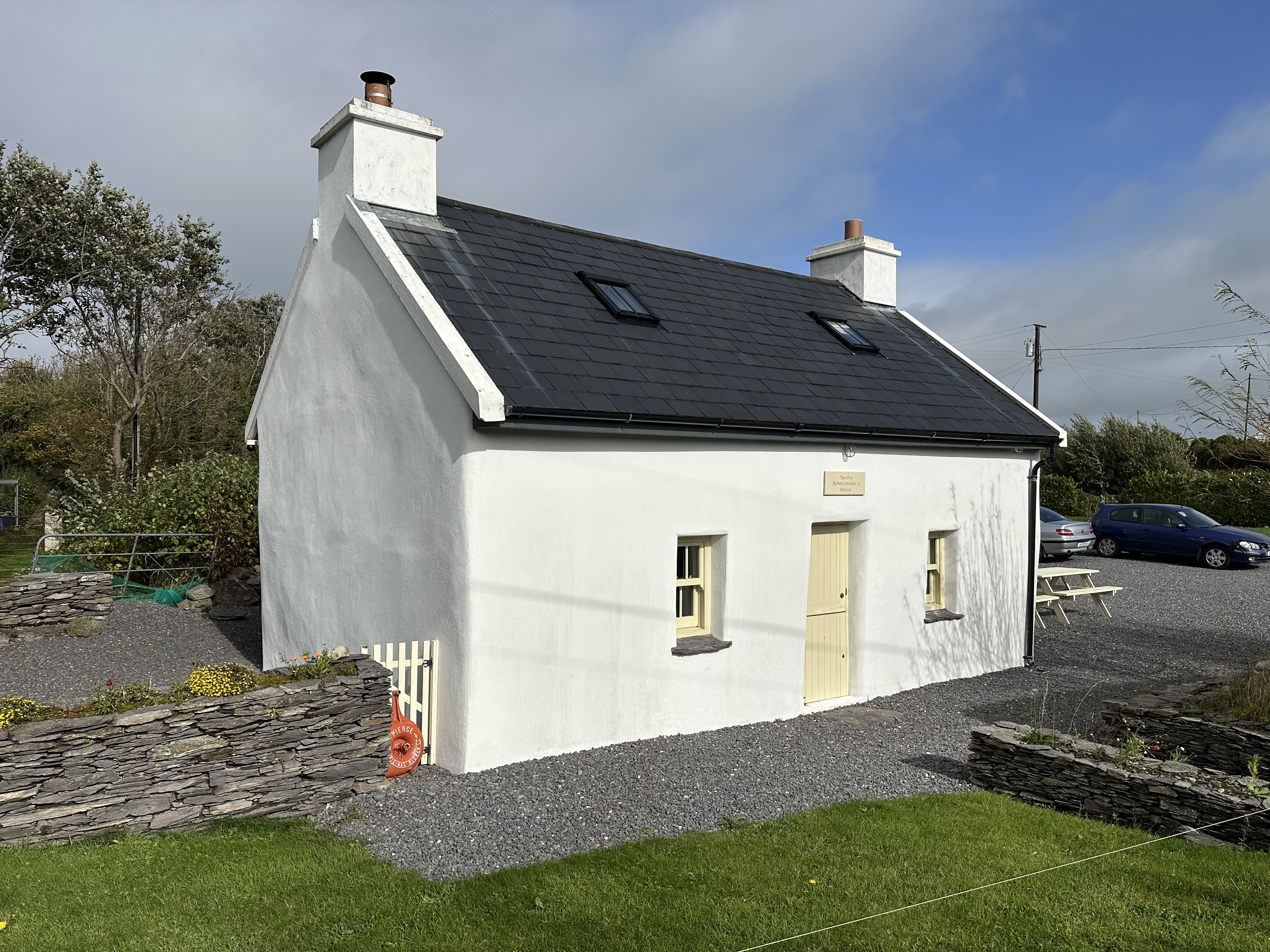
The old schoolmaster's house

Many of the ruins on the island reflect the years when the island's population was higher. The schoolhouse and schoolmaster's house are on the island's main road. The island also has 2 piers and today the shop's location is in Burke's (home of the Roaringwater Sailing School).

The main way to get to the island is via a small ferry, the M.V Thresher, which departs from Cunnamore point to the island's main pier 6 times a day, every 2 hours, from 8am to 6pm during the summer. The service has been subsidized by the Department of Arts, Heritage and the Gaeltacht since 2003, and in 2013 carried its 100,000th passenger. This ferry also operates routes from adjacent islands and Baltimore upon special request. Another ferry which services the islands is the M.V. Boy Colm which provides ferry services from Baltimore and Cunnamore throughout the summer months of July and August to Heir Island and to Sherkin Island. Unscheduled and special sailings to other destinations on this vessel are upon request. For angling trips, island and "eco" tours, the M.V. Norvic provides a service within Roaringwater Bay. A special evening ferry departs from Cunnamore at 8pm and returning at 12 midnight is by booking only.

Heir Island is supplied with mains power from the mainland through a submarine power cable.

== Geography and tourism ==
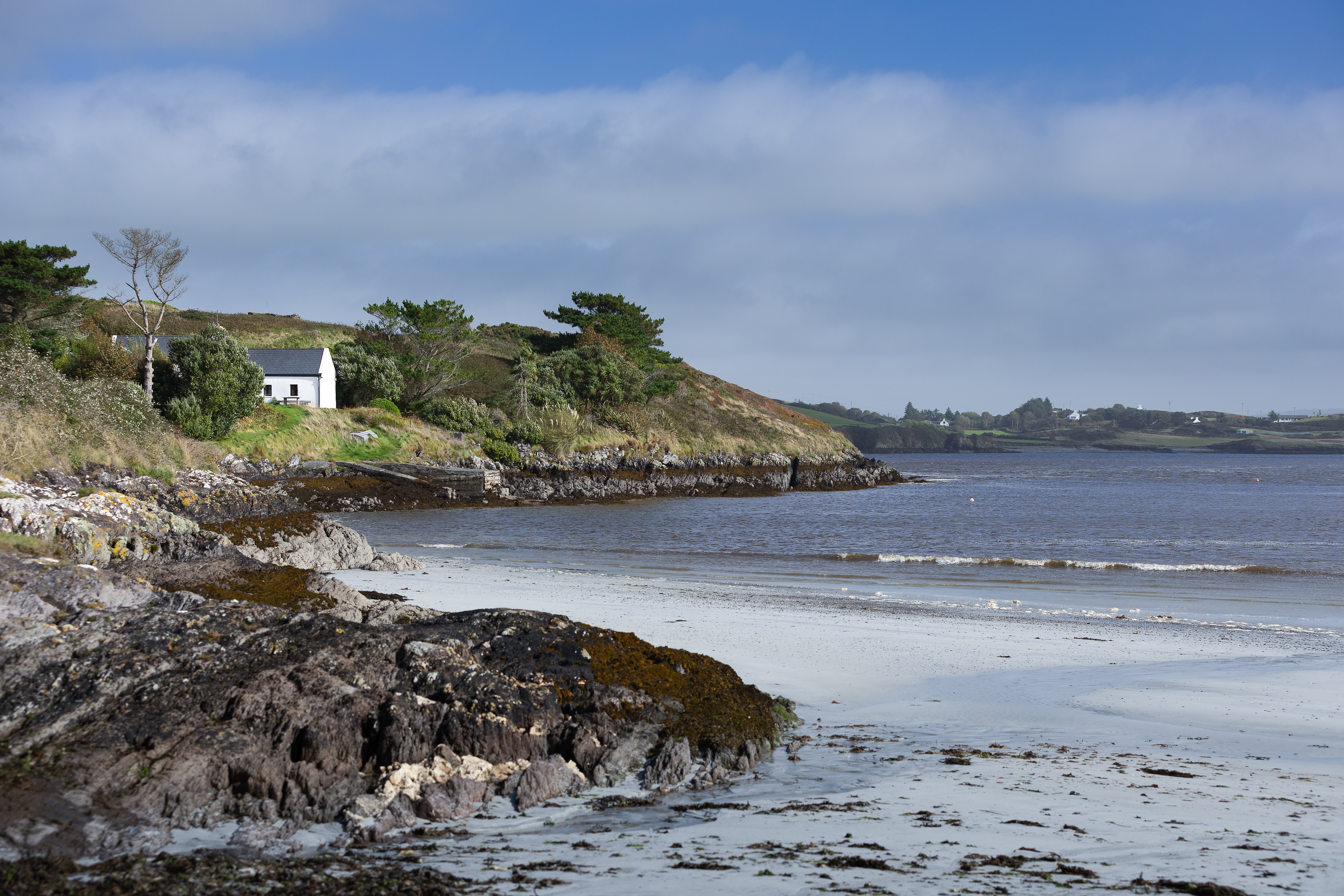
Heir Island, view towards the east from one of the island's southern beaches

The permanent population of Heir Island is only 25–30, but during summer months when the holiday homes are occupied the population increases to around 150. Although the small island does not have a pub, it has B&Bs, holiday rentals, an art gallery, a sailing school and outdoor activities camp, a holistic therapy centre, one permanent restaurant and one pop-up restaurant which is located in the Sailing School. The island is also home to a handful of artists, and their work is shown in the galleries on the island. In 2023, tables and benches were installed in several spots around Heir Island to highlight the island's role as a picnic destination.

Heir Island is one of the seven inhabited West Cork Islands. It has 23 beaches, including the Sandy Beach (or Trá Bán), a sandy stretch on the east side of the island which faces Baltimore. The beach is used as a landing point for small craft during the summer months. There are cliffs on the most south-westerly point known as The Dún. The island is also a destination for bird watchers, due to its mixture of eco-systems; coastal, forest, marsh and heathland. Over 200 species of wildflower grow on Heir Island. It is surrounded by other Carbery's Hundred Isles and has a view of Mount Gabriel near Schull. It has 360 acres (1.5 km^{2}) of fertile land, some of which is set-aside.

== See also ==
- Schull
- Carbery's Hundred Isles
- List of islands of Ireland
