= Long Island, County Cork =

Island in County Cork, Ireland

Long Island
Native name: Inis Fada
- Location within island of Ireland

Geography
- Location: Long Island Bay
- Coordinates: 51°30′N 9°33′W
- Area: 1.8 km^{2} (0.69 sq mi)

Administration
- Ireland
- Province: Munster
- County: Cork
- Barony: Carbery West

Demographics
- Population: 17 (2022)

Long Island, historically called Inishfada (Irish: Inis Fada, meaning 'long island'), is an island that lies south of Schull, County Cork, Ireland. It has a permanent population of no more than 10. The island is named for being 4.8 km (3.0 mi)long and only 0.8 km (0.5 mi) wide. It is the third largest of Carbery's Hundred Isles at 1.8 km^{2} (0.7 sq mi), after Sherkin Island and Clear Island. The island’s most distinctive landmark is Copper Point lighthouse at its eastern end, marking the entrance to Schull Harbour.

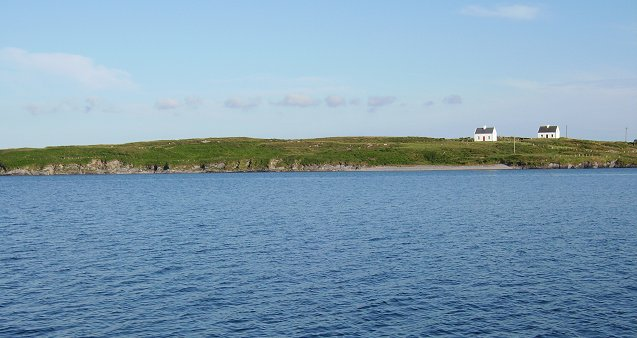
Long Island - geograph.org.uk - 252068

== History ==
In the 1840s the island had over 300 inhabitants, and the remains of this can be seen by the abandoned cottages and ruins that are left behind.

Historical population

Year	Pop.	±%
1841	305	—
1851	254	−16.7%
1901	175	−31.1%
1911	143	−18.3%
1926	119	−16.8%
1936	95	−20.2%
1946	81	−14.7%
1951	74	−8.6%
1956	52	−29.7%
1961	47	−9.6%
1966	40	−14.9%

Year	Pop.	±%
1971	39	−2.5%
1979	38	−2.6%
1986	18	−52.6%
1991	11	−38.9%
1996	9	−18.2%
2002	12	+33.3%
2006	5	−58.3%
2011	10	+100.0%
2016	20	+100.0%
2022	17	−15.0%

Source: "E2021: Population of Inhabited Islands Off the Coast 2011 to 2016 by Sex, Islands and CensusYear".

== Services ==
Long Island has a surfaced road on part of the island, and an overgrown road extends to an old copper mine. Farming is the primary economic activity on the island. There is a regular ferry service from Colla Pier to the island, operating 5 days a week during the summer months and three days a week during the winter months. Long Island is supplied with mains electricity from the mainland through a submarine power cable.

== Geography ==
Situated in Long Island Bay, Long Island is 4.8 km (3.0 mi)long and 0.8 km (0.5 mi) wide. It lies 600 metres (1,969 ft) from Colla Pier which is 3 km (2 mi) west of Schull. The body of water parting it from the mainland is called Long Island Channel. It is accessible only by boat.

== See also ==
- West Cork
- List of islands of Ireland
