= Ringarogy Island =

Geographic feature in County Cork, Ireland

Ringarogy Island Ringarogy
- Populated place
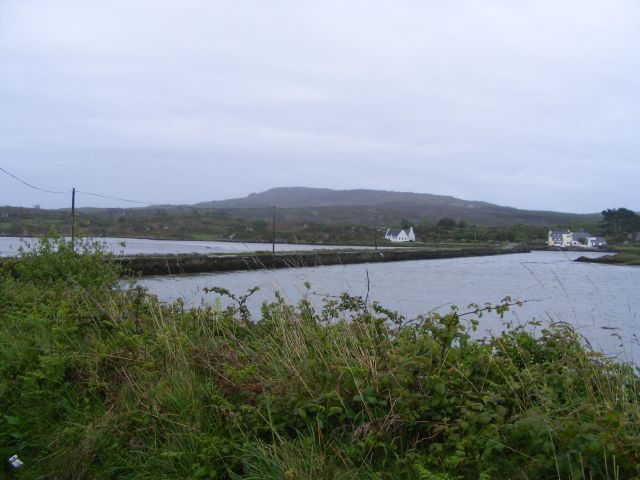

- Location in Ireland
- Coordinates: 51°30′23″N 9°22′24″W
- Country: Ireland
- Province: Munster
- County: County Cork

Population (2022)
  - Total: 88
- Time zone: UTC+0 (WET)
  - Summer (DST): UTC-1 (IST (WEST))

Ringarogy Island (Gaeilge: Rinn Ghearróige) is a former island in Roaringwater Bay, County Cork, Ireland that forms part of Carbery's Hundred Isles. Ringarogy is joined to the mainland with a bridge.

== Demographics ==
Historical population

Year	Pop.	±%
1841	597	—
1851	393	−34.2%
1861	293	−25.4%
1871	243	−17.1%
1881	239	−1.6%
1891	214	−10.5%
1901	166	−22.4%
1911	151	−9.0%
1926	134	−11.3%

Year	Pop.	±%
1936	130	−3.0%
1946	95	−26.9%
1951	97	+2.1%
1956	92	−5.2%
1961	89	−3.3%
1966	81	−9.0%
1971	75	−7.4%
1979	70	−6.7%
1981	69	−1.4%

Year	Pop.	±%
1986	75	+8.7%
1991	71	−5.3%
1996	76	+7.0%
2002	88	+15.8%
2006	88	+0.0%
2011	94	+6.8%
2016	84	−10.6%
2022	88	+4.8%

Source: Central Statistics Office. "CNA17: Population by Off Shore Island, Sex and Year". CSO.ie.
