= Carbery's Hundred Isles =

Island group in Ireland

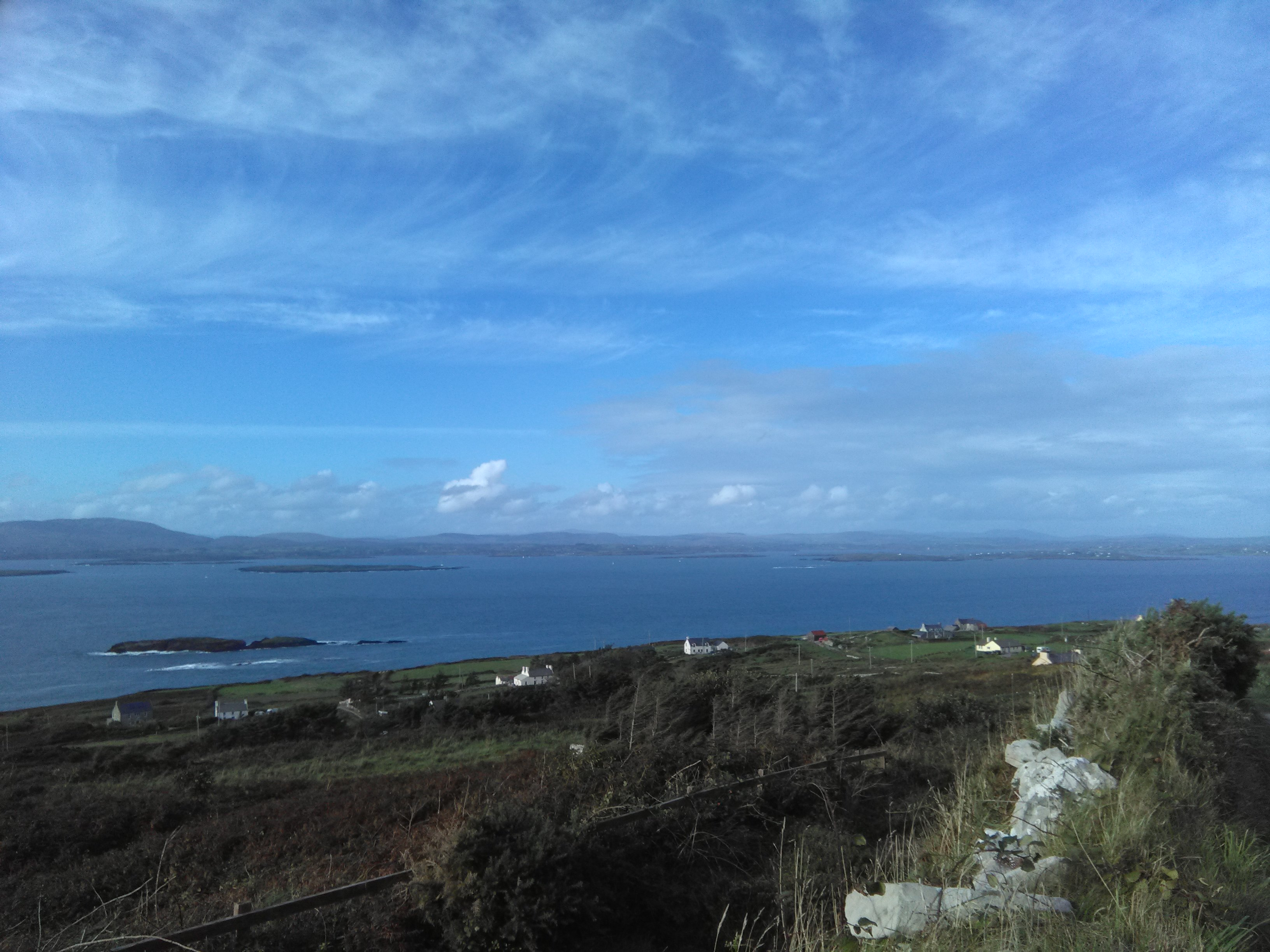
Some of Carbery's Hundred Isles, from Chleire

Carbery's Hundred Isles are the islands along the coast of the Baronies of Carbery West and Carbery East, successors to the medieval Barony of Carbery, on the Celtic Sea, in the far south-west of Ireland. It is a term which includes those islands in and around Long Island Bay and Roaringwater Bay, County Cork.

Because of the Gulf Stream influence, the islands have a mild climate. However, most of them are exposed to the elements, so patches of lush vegetation contrast with treeless expanses of hill and bog, fringed with rocky cliffs and mixed shingle and sand beaches. The eastern islands within the estuary of the Ilen River are more sheltered and fertile.

The phrase "Carbery's Hundred Isles" is taken from the narrative poem The Sack of Baltimore by Thomas Davis, published in 1844, which tells of the raid on the village of Baltimore by Algerian pirates in 1631, in which most of the inhabitants were kidnapped and brought to the slave markets of Algiers. Setting the scene, the first line reads "The summer sun is falling soft on Carbery's hundred isles". This is an instance of poetic license, since there are no more than 50 islands in the archipelago. The popularity of the poem in the 19th century meant that the phrase passed into popular parlance, and subsequently into tourist-industry literature. The area was visited by writer Jonathan Swift in the 1720s, who described the islands and area in a poem.

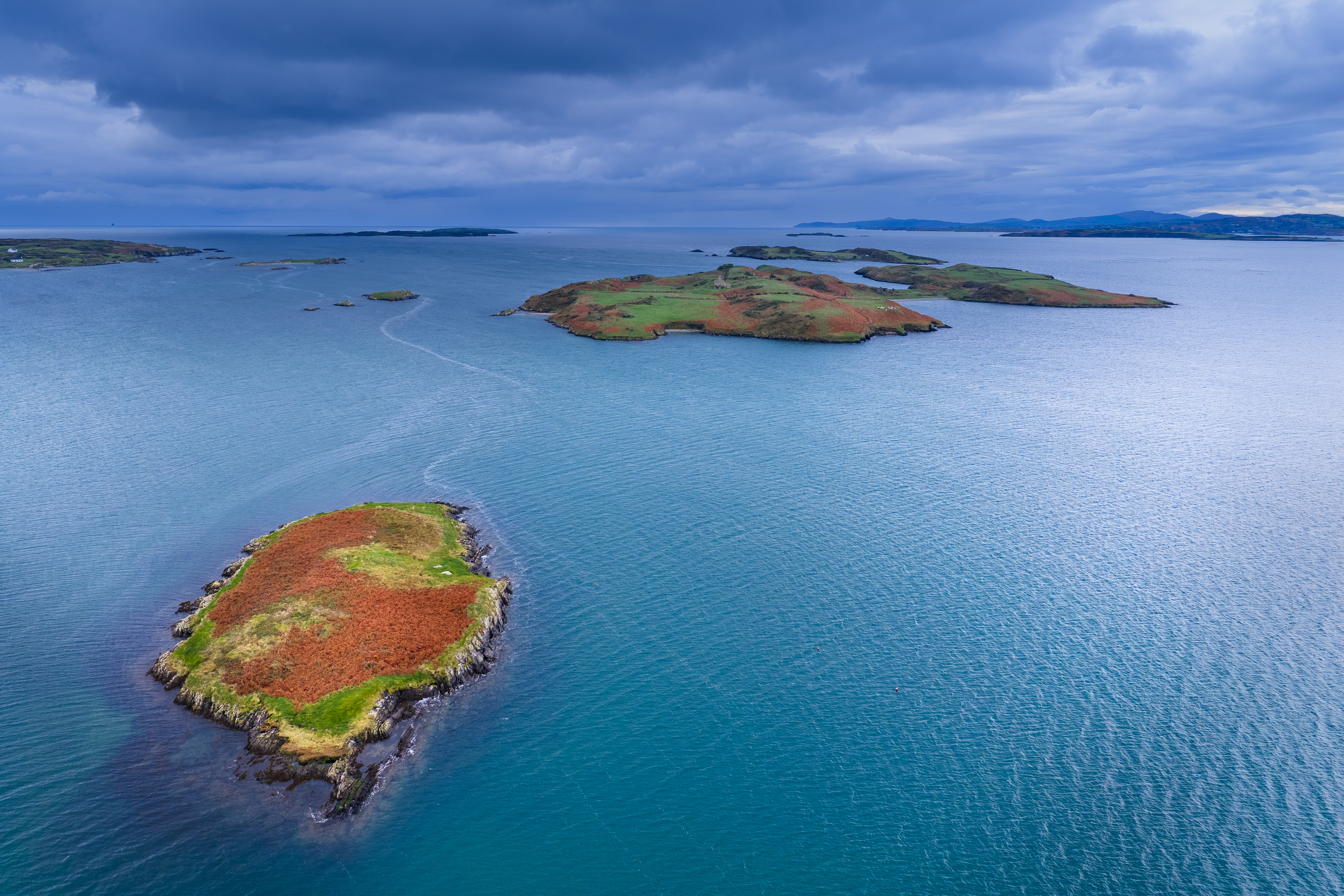
East view of Goose Island, with Skeam islands further up and right, part of Heir island on the left, and Calf islands close to the horizon, left off center

== Islands ==
The largest islands in the area include Cléire and Sherkin Island. Others include:

- Long Island
- Castle Island
- Carthy's Islands
- Horse Island, County Cork
- West Skeam Island
- East Skeam Island
- Heir Island
- Calf Islands (Calf Island West, Calf Island Middle, Calf Island East)
- Spanish Island
- Ringarogy Island
- Goat Island (Beg/Mór)
- Rabbit island

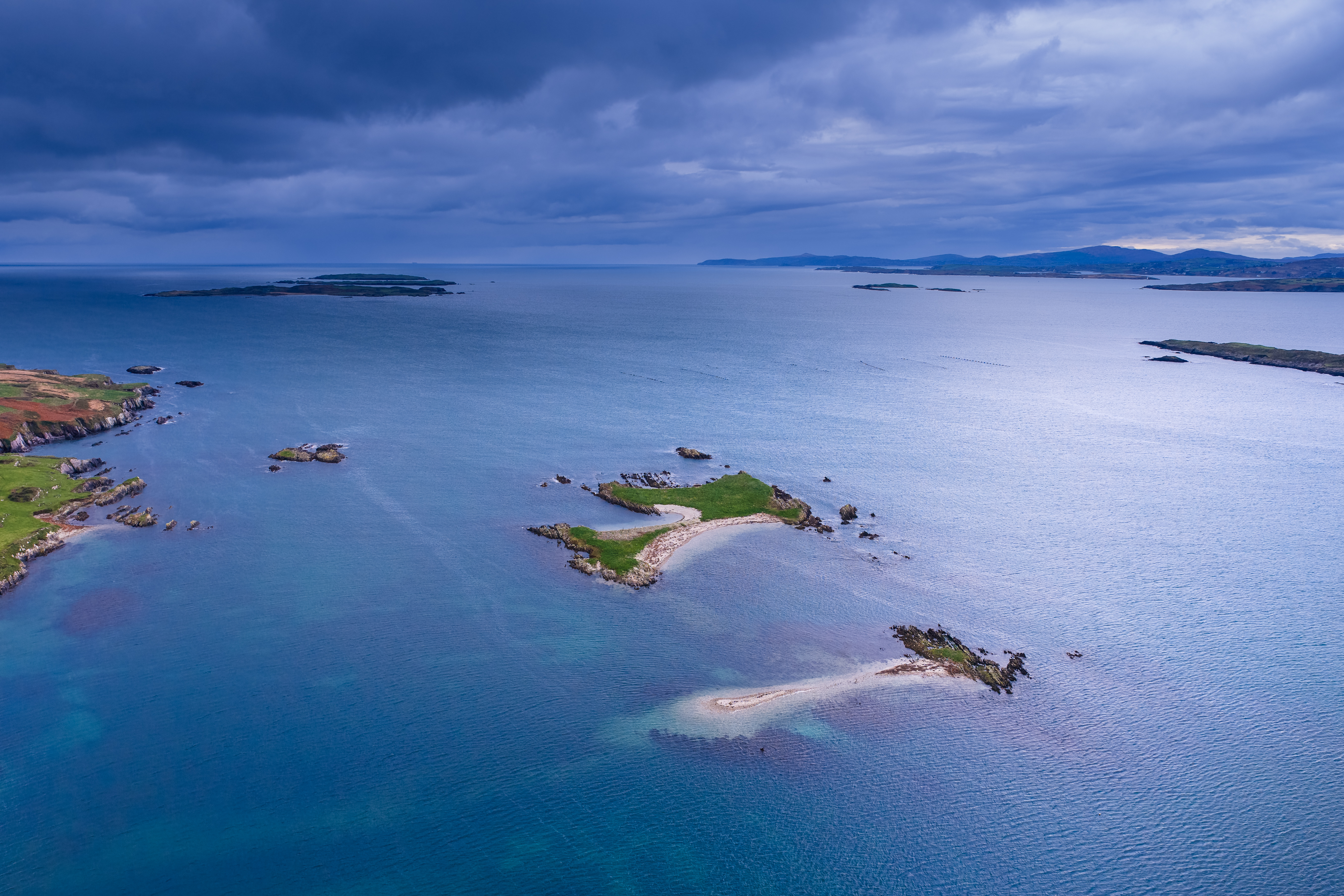
Illaunkearagh East (center bottom), Illaunkearagh West (further up), and part of Heir island (left). Further in the distance, Calf Islands (top left), Carthy's Islands (small archipelago off the top center of the image), Long Island (further behind it), Castle Island (top far right), Skeam West (center far right)

== See also ==
- Clew Bay
- List of islands of Ireland
- Mizen Head
