= Melanagh =

Melanagh (from Irish Meallanacht, meaning 'O'Mellons country') is an ancient Irish district in what is now north-eastern County Tyrone, Northern Ireland. Melanagh along with Tarraghter were once part of the barony of Loughinsholin until the Plantation of Ulster, which saw them merged with the barony of Mountjoy (modern-day barony of Dungannon Upper).

Situated to the south of Slieve Gallion, Melanagh was divided into two portions. One portion lay in between Tarraghter and Killetra, in an area roughly in between the Ballinderry and Lissan Rivers. The other portion lay in between Tarraghter, Killetra, and Glenconkeyne. Both portions were connected by Tarraghters termon lands.

== History ==
Melanagh derives its name from the Irish Meallanacht, which means "O'Mellans country". It was a termon (church land) of which the O'Mellans were the erenaghs. During the Plantation of Ulster it passed into ownership of the Church of Ireland, thus Melanagh passed into the hands of the Archbishop of Armagh, who in turn leased it to English and Scottish settlers.

In 1628, Dr. Allen Cooke, an English ecclesiastical lawyer, received a grant from King Charles I to build a market town, which was to become known as Cooke's Town (modern day Cookstown). Cooke purchased extensive areas of land in Malenagh from the Archbishop of Armagh, including the townland of "Core Criche" on which Cookstown was founded.

Despite deriving from the same origin, the O'Mellans who gave their name to the district were originally located south of the Sperrin Mountains, whilst the O'Mullans were located north of them.
