= Inisherkin =

Inisherkin is the name of two islands in Ireland:

- Inisherkin, in Clew Bay, County Mayo
- Sherkin Island, off Baltimore, County Cork
