= Horse Island, County Cork =

Small inhabited island in Ireland

Horse Island
Native name: Oileán na gCapall
- Location within island of Ireland

Geography
- Location: Roaring Water bay
- Coordinates: 51.516°N 9.468°W
- Area: 0.635 km^{2} (0.245 sq mi)

Administration
- Ireland
- Province: Munster
- County: Cork
- Barony: Carbery West

Demographics
- Population: 1 (2022)

Horse Island (Gaeilge: Oileán na gCapall) is a small inhabited island in Roaringwater Bay, County Cork, Ireland, off the coast of Schull, that forms part of Carbery's Hundred Isles. No ferry service operates to and from the island; however, there is a pier, a heliport and a road on the island.

The island is privately owned and in 2018 was offered for sale for the price of €6,750,000. The property ultimately sold for a price of €5,500,000 to a European Ultra high-net-worth individual in July 2020. Due to the pandemic, the buyer was not allowed to tour the island but viewed a video tour about its amenities.

== History ==
In the 19th century, a copper mine was operated on the 157 acre island by West Cork Mining Company, owned most recently by West Cork Mining Company, employing approximately 100 miners at one time. The mine started operating in 1820 and closed in 1874. At its peak in 1841, the island's population was 137. The last permanent resident, Paddy McCarthy, left Horse Island in 1965. In his time, there were only five families on the island. Willie Harcourt-Cooze's father bought Horse Island, where he started farming and living a self-sufficient life.

For some years, the island was owned by Gert Kölbel, a wealthy German (inventor of the Bullworker), who renovated a few of the buildings in the 1980s. It was sold to financier Adrian Fitzgibbon and wife Deborah in 2007. In less than a year, they turned a barn into the main house. By the time they listed it for sale in 2018, "The island has seven houses, including a six-bedroom main home, plus a pier, helipad, gym, tennis court ... its own electricity, water and sewage systems" according to The Guardian. Another source added that the island also included "six guesthouses and guest cottages", three diesel generators, wind turbines" and pipes to an underwater aquifer for drinking water.

In 2014, an attempt had been made by the Fitzgibbon family to set up an Irish whiskey distillery and visitor centre on the island, but planning permission was refused by An Bord Pleanála. The couple had also attempted to raise Wagyu cattle but that plan did not work successfully. The island still had a "main cattle shed, an implement shed [and a] workshop" as of 2019.

As of June 2018, the island had a permanent caretaker.

== Demographics ==
Historical population

Year	Pop.	±%
1841	137	—
1851	116	−15.3%
1861	84	−27.6%
1871	72	−14.3%
1881	63	−12.5%
1891	48	−23.8%
1901	42	−12.5%
1911	27	−35.7%
1926	20	−25.9%

Year	Pop.	±%
1936	26	+30.0%
1946	28	+7.7%
1951	20	−28.6%
1956	16	−20.0%
1961	12	−25.0%
1966	0	−100.0%
1971	0	0.00%
1979	0	0.00%
1981	0	0.00%

Year	Pop.	±%
1986	0	0.00%
1991	0	0.00%
1996	0	0.00%
2002	3	—
2006	2	−33.3%
2011	2	+0.0%
2016	1	−50.0%
2022	1	+0.0%

Source: Central Statistics Office. "CNA17: Population by Off Shore Island, Sex and Year". CSO.ie. and "CD120: Population of Inhabited Islands Off the Coast by Sex, Islands by Electoral Division and CensusYear".
