= Open Ear Festival =

Annual music festival held on Sherkin Island, County Cork, Ireland

Open Ear
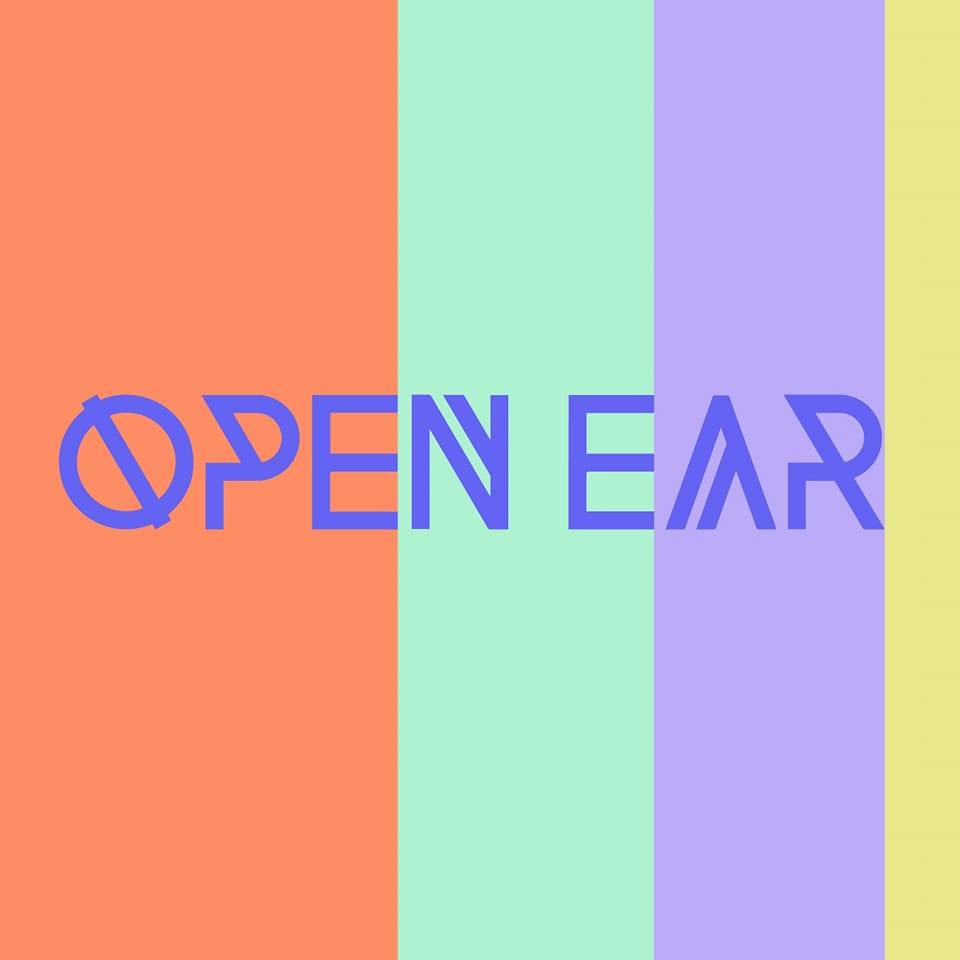
- 2024 logo/banner
- Status: Active
- Genre: Music festival
- Frequency: Annually
- Location: Sherkin Island off the coast of County Cork
- Coordinates: 51°28′38.77″N 9°25′29.61″W
- Country: Ireland
- Inaugurated: June 3, 2016
- Founder: Chris Chapman
- Sponsor: Irish Music Rights Organisation; Cork County Council
- Website: www.openear.ie

Open Ear is an annual music festival held on Sherkin Island off the coast of County Cork, Ireland which focuses on experimental and avant-garde music and performances. Since its founding in 2016, the festival has become known for its site-specific installations, intimate atmosphere, and emphasis on Irish artists working in electronic, ambient, and sound art traditions.

== History ==
The Open Ear Festival began in 2016, intending to provide a platform for Irish experimental and electronic musicians in a unique, off-grid setting. Organiser Chris Chapman was inspired to create the festival during a rain-soaked camping trip on the island in 2015. Collaborating with the owners of the Sherkin North Shore Guesthouse, the Open Ear team hosted the inaugural edition of the festival on the 2016 June Bank Holiday weekend. The event welcomed a small but enthusiastic crowd and featured a diverse programme that ranged from ambient and drone to field recordings and experimental techno.

In the years that followed, Open Ear gained a reputation as one of Ireland's most distinctive music festivals. Coverage in the Irish Times noted how it combined the natural beauty of the island with adventurous programming. The festival steadily expanded, both in terms of its artist line-up and its use of Sherkin’s venues. Local spaces like the community hall, beaches, and St Mona’s Church were used for site-specific performances and installations.

Open Ear positioned itself within the tradition of previously held alternative music festivals in Ireland such as Leechrum and the Dublin Electronic Arts Festival (DEAF), while drawing influence from Krakow's Unsound festival, which is known for its curated music programme. Attendance for early iterations of the festival were deliberately small, with 2017 being held before 500 people, while the capacity for the 2019 edition was simply 600 people.

Open Ear took a hiatus during the COVID-19 pandemic, halting the festival for two years.

In 2025, the festival returned with renewed ambition and expanded creative scope. The event featured permanent sound installations across the island and a short documentary titled Island Rules was released to mark the occasion.

As of 2025, Open Ear continues to operate as an annual event focused on independent cultural programming in Ireland. It provides a platform for experimental artists and audiences interested in non-mainstream music, positioning itself as an alternative to larger, commercially oriented festivals. Recent line-ups have featured performers from both Irish and international electronic backgrounds.

== Logistics ==
Attendees to the festival must take a ferry from Baltimore, County Cork to reach Sherkin Island. Once there, there are no cars on the Island for transport, and attendees walk from one side of the island to the other to reach the festival site.
