= Tarraghter =

Tarraghter, also recorded as Erraghter and Farraghter (from Irish Arachtra), is an ancient Irish district in what is now north-eastern County Tyrone, Northern Ireland. Tarraghter along with Melanagh were once part of the barony of Loughinsholin until the Plantation of Ulster, which saw them merge with the barony of Mountjoy (modern-day barony of Dungannon Upper).

The southern boundary of Tarraghter is the Ballinderry River running east, encompassing the greater parts of the parishes of Derryloran, Kildress, and Lissan that lies north of the river. It, however, excludes the termon land of Melanagh, which lie along the Lissan River.

== Etymology ==
The townland of Oritor in Kildress civil parish, is cited as maintaining the original Irish name of the territory - Arachtra. Indeed, amongst the previous recorded forms of Oritor townland are listed: Arrater (1614, 1620, 1655); Erraghter (1616, 1619, 1621); and Tarraghter (1614, 1619, 1621). It is also recorded in 1645 in Irish as Fharachtra.
