= West Skeam Island =

Island in Roaringwater Bay, County Cork, Ireland

Coordinates: 51.503°N 9.460°W

West Skeam Island is a 33-acre island in Roaringwater Bay, County Cork, Ireland that forms part of Carbery's Hundred Isles. The island is privately owned and was for sale in 2013. There are three cottages on the island, as well as some farmland. The ruins of a fifth century church stand above a beach at the east end of the island. The eastern end of this building has been washed into the sea, but the western end still remains. The Office of Public Works conducted an excavation of the area in 1990, which revealed several graves. Work was subsequently carried out to prevent further loss of the structure by building a protective wall on the beach beneath the remains of the church. In modern times, the island was inhabited from the mid nineteenth century, until the 1930s, when the last inhabitants left.
