= Tomlagh =

Historic district in County Londonderry, Northern Ireland

Tomlagh (from Irish Tamhnach, meaning 'field') is an early-modern Irish district in what is now southern County Londonderry, Northern Ireland. Along with the ancient districts of Clandonnell, Glenconkeyne, and Killetra, it comprised the former barony of Loughinsholin. Tomlagh is stated as forming a four-or-five-mile-wide district running from Portglenone to Lough Beg. The townland of Annaghmore, near Castledawson is mentioned in Bodley's map from 1609 as lying within Tomlagh.

== Etymology ==
The name Tomlagh is believed to be derived from the Irish word Tamhnach, meaning field. This in turn is claimed to derive from Tamnach Ui Fhuradhrain, named after the descendants of Furudran, son Beic (one of the Three Collas).
