= Túath =

Basic political and jurisdictional unit of Gaelic Ireland

Túath (plural túatha) is the Old Irish term for the basic political and jurisdictional unit of Gaelic Ireland. Túath can refer to both a geographical territory as well the people who lived in that territory. The smallest túath controlled by a king was about the size of a later Irish barony (about 177sq miles) and kings with greater power would have two or more túatha under their control, according to A Smaller Social History of Ancient Ireland.

== Social structure ==
In ancient Irish terms, a household was reckoned at about 30 people per dwelling. A trícha cét ("thirty hundreds"), was an area comprising 100 dwellings or, roughly, 3,000 people. A túath consisted of a number of allied trícha céta, and therefore referred to no fewer than 6,000 people. Probably a more accurate number for a túath would be no fewer than 9,000 people.

Each túath was a self-contained unit, with its own executive, assembly, courts system and defence force. Túatha were grouped together into confederations for mutual defence. There was a hierarchy of túatha statuses, depending on geographical position and connection to the ruling dynasties of the region. The organisation of túatha is covered to a great extent within the Brehon laws, Irish laws written down in the 7th century, also known as the Fénechas.

The old Irish political system was altered during and after the Elizabethan conquest, being gradually replaced by a system of baronies and counties under the new colonial system. Due to a loss of knowledge, there has been some confusion regarding old territorial units in Ireland, mainly between trícha céta and túatha, which in some cases seem to be overlapping units, and in others, different measurements altogether. The trícha céta were primarily for reckoning military units; specifically, the number of fighting forces a particular population could rally. Some scholars equate the túath with the modern parish, whereas others equate it with the barony. This partly depends on how the territory was first incorporated into the county system. In cases where surrender and regrant was the method, the match between the old túath and the modern barony is reasonably equivalent. Whereas in cases like Ulster, which involved large scale colonisation and confiscation of land, the shape of the original divisions is not always clear or recoverable.

It has been suggested that the baronies are, for the most part, divided along the boundaries of the ancient túatha, as many bog bodies and offerings, such as bog butter, are primarily found along present-day baronial boundaries. This implies that the territorial divisions of the petty kingdoms of Ireland have been more or less the same since at least the Iron Age.

== Etymology ==
Túath in Old Irish means both "the people", "country, territory", and "territory, petty kingdom, the political and jurisdictional unit of ancient Ireland". The word possibly derives from Proto-Celtic *toutā ("tribe, tribal homeland"; cognate roots may be found in the Gaulish god name Toutatis), which is perhaps from Proto-Indo-European *tewtéh₂ ("tribesman, tribal citizen"). In Modern Irish it is spelled tuath, without the fada accent, and is usually used to refer to "rural districts" or "the country" (as in "the countryside", in contradistinction to "the city"); however the historical meaning is still understood and employed, as well.

== Historical examples ==
- Tuatha Dé Danann
- Cairbre Drom Cliabh
- Tir Fhiacrach Muaidhe
- Tir Olliol
- Corann
- Dartraighe
- Osraige – túath that later became the kingdom of the same name in the Christian era
- Dál Riata – the túath that became a confederation of túatha and eventually settled in Alba, creating the modern nation of Scotland
- Clandonnell, Glenconkeyne, Killetra, Melanagh, Tarraghter, and Tomlagh, which all once formed the ancient territory of Loughinsholin

== See also ==
- Trícha cét
- Tongu do dia toinges mo thúath
- List of Irish kingdoms
- Gaelic Ireland
- History of Ireland
