= Killetra =

Killetra (from Irish Coill Íochtarach 'lower wood') is an early-modern Irish district in what is now southern County Londonderry, Northern Ireland. Killetra along with the ancient districts of Clandonnell, Glenconkeyne, and Tomlagh, comprised the former barony of Loughinsholin, with Killetra reaching from the present-day town of Magherafelt to the Ballinderry River.

As a result of the dense forest that used to cover Killetra and Glenconkeyne both formed the most inaccessible part of the whole of Ulster.
