= Carbery West =

Barony (land unit) in County Cork, Ireland

Carbery West (Irish: Cairbrigh Thiar (Note: Carbery West (E.D.))) is a barony in County Cork in Ireland. It has been split since the nineteenth century into East and West Divisions (an Roinn Thoir/Thiar). (Note: Carbery West (W.D.))

== Legal context ==
Baronies were created after the Norman invasion of Ireland as divisions of counties and were used the administration of justice and the raising of revenue. While baronies continue to be officially defined units, they have been administratively obsolete since 1898. However, they continue to be used in land registration and in specification, such as in planning permissions. In many cases, a barony corresponds to an earlier Gaelic túath which had submitted to the Crown.

== History ==
Originally Carbery West formed a single Barony of Carbery with Carbery East. This was essentially a small, semi-independent kingdom, ruled over by the MacCarthy Reagh dynasty from the 13th through 16th centuries, that broke away from the larger Kingdom of Desmond. Patrick Weston Joyce said the name Carbery comes from Uí Chairpre Áebda, of which a sept, the O'Donovans under Cathal Ua Donnubáin, migrated to the area c.1300 after being driven from County Limerick by the Fitzgeralds. The antiquarian Canon John O'Mahony disagreed, and offered three alternatives: Cairpre founder of Dál Riata; or Cairbre of Uibh Laoghaire; or the Ui Carbre of Corcu Loígde, from whom Rosscarbery in the barony of Carbery East is named. However, supporting the first theory is that the O'Donovans, such as Crom Ua Donnabáin, are closely associated with earliest MacCarthys in the area, and soon became their chief vassals, holding approximately 100,000 acres (400 km^{2}) right in the middle of the medieval barony.

In the early 17th century, Leamcon (near Schull) was a pirate stronghold, while Baltimore's economy depended heavily on piracy.

== Location and settlements ==
Carbery West is bordered by the baronies of Carbery East to the east and Bantry to the north. To the south and west is a long indented coastline; the Celtic Sea as far west as Mizen Head, and thence around Dunmanus Bay to Bantry Bay.

=== East Division settlements ===
Settlements in the division include Baltimore, (Note: Carbery West (E.D.): towns) Bredagh Cross, (Note: Carbery West (E.D.): population centres) Castletownshend, Drimoleague, Drinagh, Leap, Skibbereen, (Note: Carbery West (E.D.): features) and Union Hall.

Other features include Clear Island (Note: Carbery West (E.D.): islands and archipelagoes) and Sherkin Island.

=== West Division settlements ===
Settlements in the division include Ballydehob, (Note: Carbery West (W.D.): towns) Goleen, (Note: Carbery West (W.D.): population centres) Schull,

Other features include Sheep's Head. (Note: Carbery West (W.D.): promontories)

== See also ==
- List of civil parishes of County Cork
- List of townlands of the barony of West Carbery (E.D.) in County Cork
