= Roaringwater Bay =

Bay in West Cork, Ireland

- Roaring-Water Bay
- Loch Trasna (Irish)
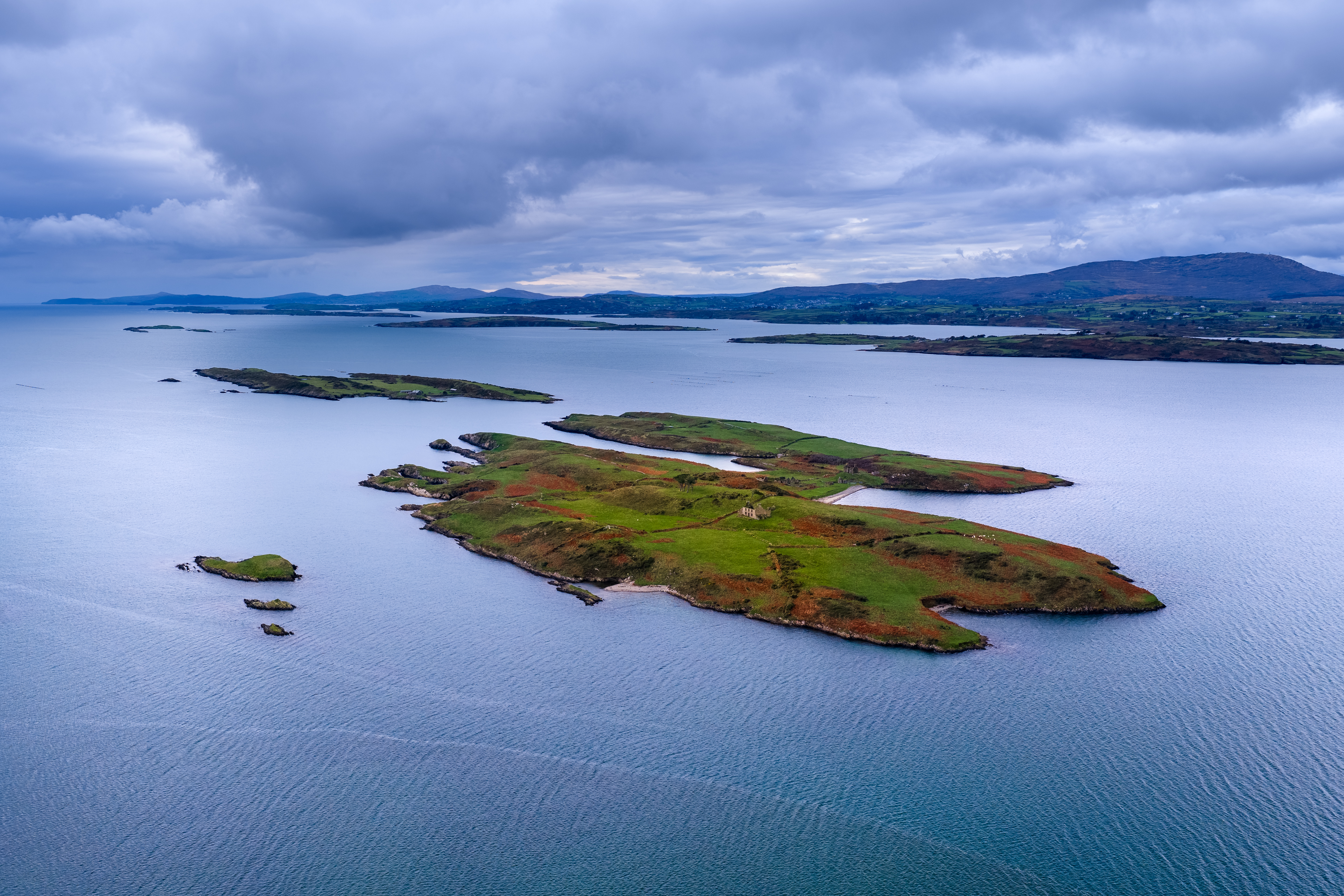
- Roaringwater Bay as seen from above Heir Island, with camera facing onto Skeam Islands and further north-west

- Location in Ireland
- Location: County Cork
- Coordinates: 51.517°N 9.444°W
- Type: bay
- Part of: North Atlantic Ocean
- Primary inflows: Roaringwater River
- River sources: Roaringwater River, Rathruane River, Bawnaknockane River, Leamawaddra River
- Ocean/sea sources: North Atlantic Ocean
- Basin countries: Ireland
- Designation: Special Area of Conservation (SAC)
- Max. length: approx. 18 kilometres (11 mi)
- Max. width: approx. 11 kilometres (6.8 mi)
- Settlements: Ballydehob, Schull

Roaringwater Bay, or Lough Trasnagh (Irish: Loch Trasna), is a bay in County Cork in south-western Ireland.

== History ==
Until the late Middle Ages, large parts of Roaringwater Bay were under the control of chieftains, in particular O'Mahonys, O'Driscolls and McCarthys who built several castles in the area to control the fisheries and water access in general.

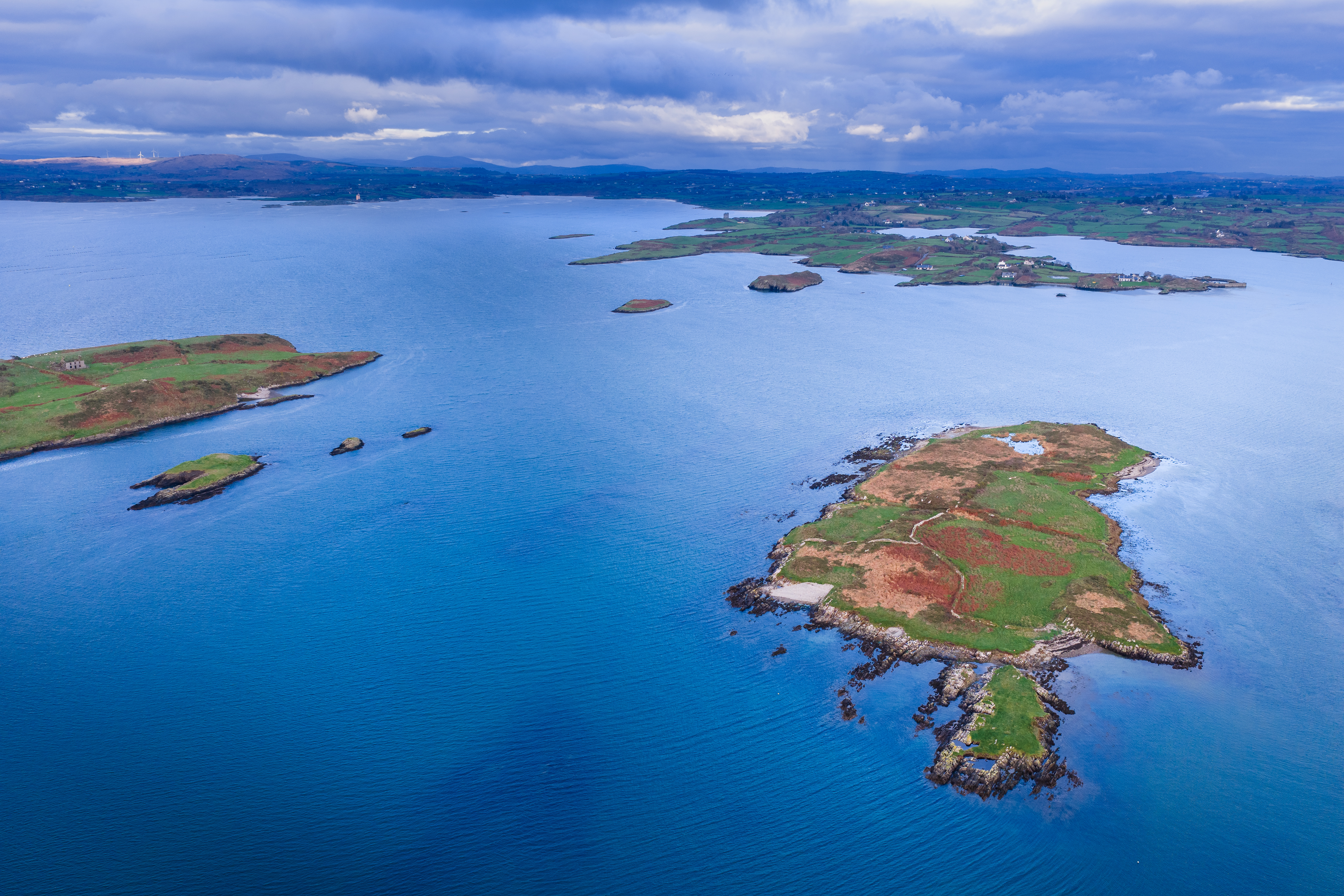
Illaungawna Island (right), and part of Skeam East island (left). Cunnamore promontory with the pier visible in distance.

== Geography ==
There are no officially defined boundaries of Roaringwater Bay. While Ordnance Survey Ireland maps place the name within the smaller inlet east of the Horse Island, the National Parks And Wildlife Service defined the Roaringwater Bay and Islands Special Area of Conservation (SAC) as reaching as far west as Toormore Bay, and encompassing Cape Clear, Sherkin and Long Island. In any case the natural boundaries are the south-eastern shore of the Mizen Peninsula in the north, Baltimore Harbour in the south, and the wider, open Long Island Bay on the west.

The bay contains many islands, including what is known as Carbery's Hundred Isles. This group of islands spread between Roaringwater Bay and Long Island Bay, with the three largest being Cape Clear Island, Sherkin Island and Heir Island. Some of the islands in the bay, including Castle Island and Horse Island, are privately owned.

The bedrock of the area is composed of old red sandstone reefs, and most of the islands and coastal areas are relatively flat, only raising towards the south and culminating at 160m on Cape Clear.

The largest towns and villages around Roaringwater Bay include Schull, Ballydehob and Baltimore.

== Wildlife and aquaculture ==
Roaringwater Bay is a Special Area of Conservation due to the presence of large shallow inlets, reefs, vegetated cliffs, dry heath, sea caves, as well as protected species including harbour porpoise (in 2008 the population was estimated at 117-201 individuals), otter and grey seal (population in 2005 was between 116-149). The National Parks and Wildlife Service has described Roaringwater Bay as "one of the most important sites in Ireland" for harbour porpoise and a "nationally important" site for black guillemot.

Both historically and in the present day, the bay area has been used for cultivating aquaculture. Since before the Great Famine, some local fishermen specialised in lobster fishing. Distinct methods of fishing — using Cornish lobster pots and towelsail yawls — were developed, and fishing excursions from the Roaringwater Bay reached as far as Dursey Head in the north and Ardmore in the east. In 1892, 40 lobster boats operated in the area, with over three-quarters of them on Heir Island.

As of the year 2000, Roaringwater bay was producing over 800 tons of mussels and almost 200 tons of pacific oyster, with 2.4% of the bay area used for aquaculture, and over 30 people employed in the industry. Roaringwater Bay is one of the bays and harbours covered by the Co-Ordinated Local Aquaculture Management System ("CLAMS") run by Bord Iascaigh Mhara. Inclusion of the Roaringwater Bay in the CLAMS initiative was promoted by the actor Jeremy Irons whose Kilcoe Castle is situated on the bay's shore.

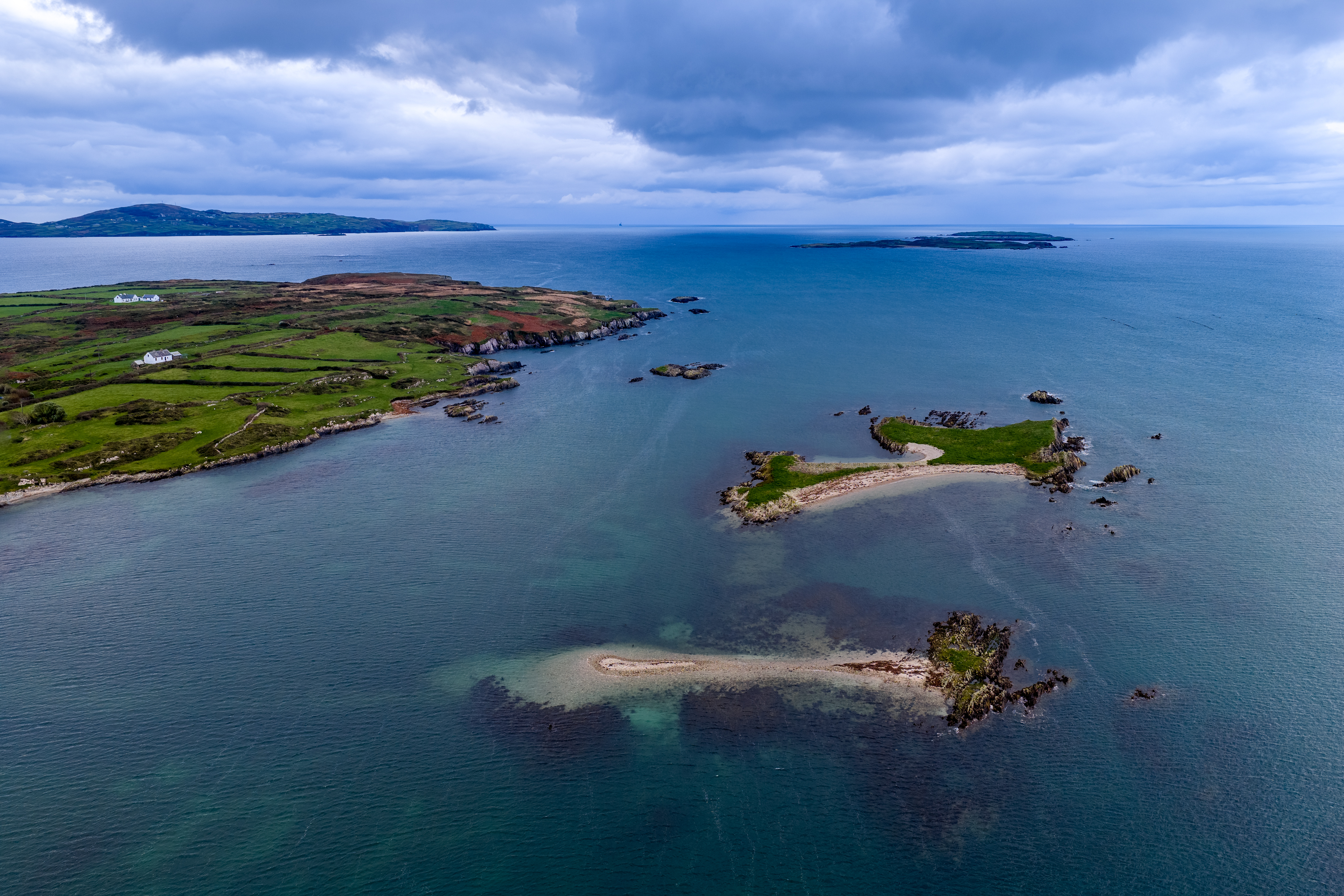
Illaunkearagh East (center bottom), Illaunkearagh West (further up), and part of Heir island (left). Further in the distance, Calf Islands (top right), Cape Clear island (top left), and Fastnet visible as a small dot on the horizon between them.

== Maritime accidents ==
On 10 November 1847, the Stephen Whitney sank at West Calf Island in Roaringwater Bay. 92 people of the 110 on board the ship were drowned.

On 13 December 1904, a towelsail yawl overturned, with two of the five-men crew losing their lives.

In 1918, the Thomas Joseph ship sank at the Catalogue Islands, killing six.
