= Cape Clear Island =

Island off the southwest coast of Ireland

Native name: Cléire
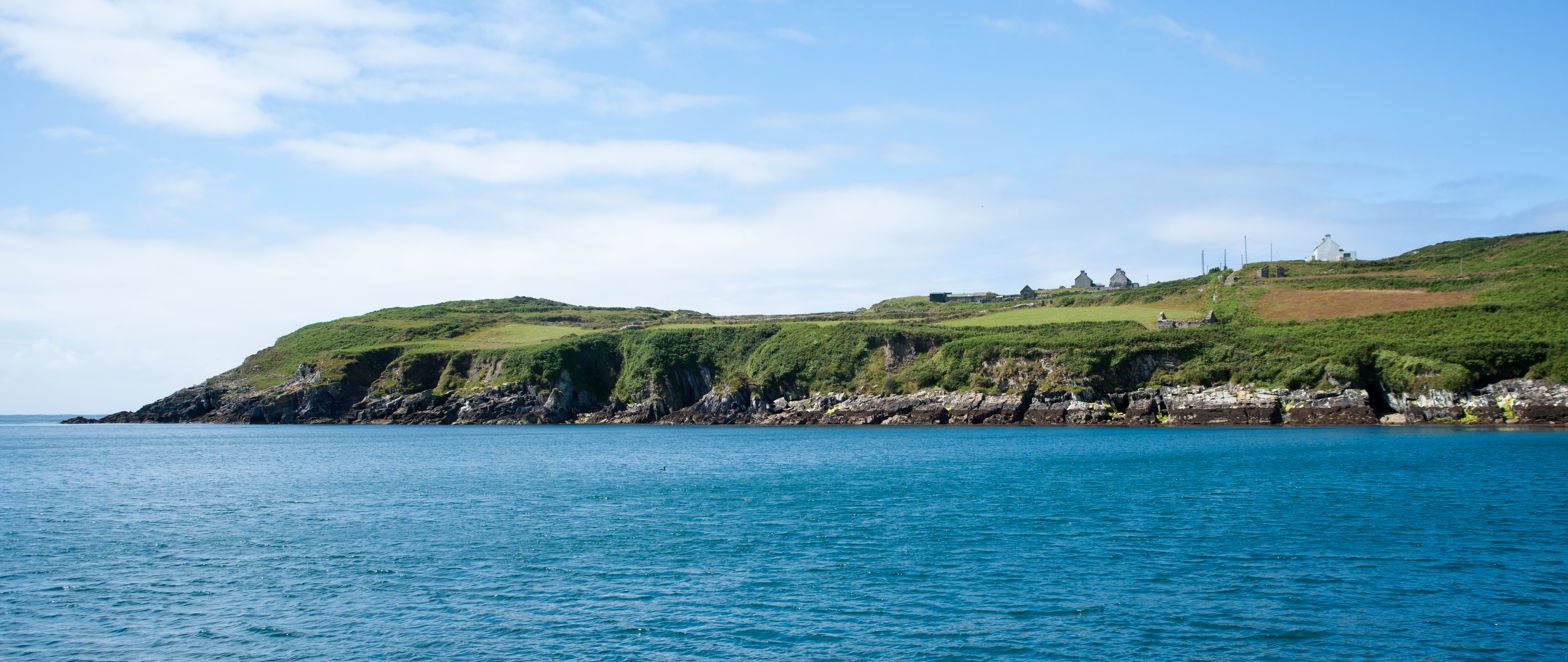
- View from the island's South Harbour

- Cape Clear Island (Ireland)

Geography
- Location: Carbery's Hundred Isles
- Coordinates: 51°26′N 9°30′W
- Area: 6.7 km^{2} (2.6 sq mi)
- Length: 5.2 km (3.23 mi)
- Width: 2.4 km (1.49 mi)
- Highest elevation: 160 m (520 ft)
- Highest point: Cnoicín an tSeabhaic

Administration
- Ireland
- Province: Munster
- County: Cork
- Barony: Carbery West

Demographics
- Population: 110 (2022)
- Pop. density: 18.6/km^{2} (48.2/sq mi)

Additional information
- Official website: capeclearisland.ie
- The island is a Gaeltacht

Clear Island or Cape Clear Island (officially known by its Irish name: Cléire, and sometimes also called Oileán Chléire) is an island off the south-west coast of County Cork in Ireland. It is the southernmost inhabited part of Ireland and had a population of 110 people as of the 2022 census.

The island is a Gaeltacht area (Irish-speaking area), in which Irish is spoken on a daily basis. The nearest neighbouring island is Sherkin Island, which is 2 kilometres (1 nautical mile) east of Cape Clear Island.

The island is divided into east and west halves by an isthmus called the Waist, with the North Harbour to the landward side and the South Harbour on the seaward side. Ferries sail regularly from the North Harbour to Schull and Baltimore on the mainland. The South Harbour is a popular berth for yachts and pleasure boats during the summer months.

== History ==
Archaeological sites on the island include a prehistoric cup-marked stone (currently in the island's museum), a fulacht fiadh at Gort na Lobhar, a Neolithic passage tomb at Cill Leire Forabhain, several standing stones around the island, a promontory fort at Dún an Óir, and a signal tower dating from the Napoleonic Wars. The island also has a number of early Christian sites, and is reputed to be the birthplace of Saint Ciarán of Saigir. The ruin of a 12th-century church, which has protected national monument status, is close to the main pier in the North Harbour.

The island had a population of over 1,052 before the 19th century famine, but the current population of Cape Clear is less than one-eighth of that figure. The island's primary school was built in 1897, and was visited by President of Ireland Mary McAleese in 1998.

Cape Clear was originally supplied with electricity produced by diesel generators on the island, but around 1995 these were replaced with a submarine power cable from the mainland.

Historical population

Year	Pop.	±%
1841	1,052	—
1851	819	−22.1%
1861	756	−7.7%
1871	572	−24.3%
1881	594	+3.8%
1891	584	−1.7%
1901	601	+2.9%
1911	565	−6.0%
1926	453	−19.8%

Year	Pop.	±%
1936	354	−21.9%
1946	281	−20.6%
1951	257	−8.5%
1956	245	−4.7%
1961	235	−4.1%
1966	217	−7.7%
1971	192	−11.5%
1979	155	−19.3%
1981	164	+5.8%

Year	Pop.	±%
1986	145	−11.6%
1991	132	−9.0%
1996	145	+9.8%
2002	129	−11.0%
2006	125	−3.1%
2011	124	−0.8%
2016	147	+18.5%
2022	110	−25.2%

Sources: Central Statistics Office. "CNA17: Population by Off Shore Island, Sex and Year". and "E2021 - Population of Inhabited Islands Off the Coast 2011 to 2016 (Number) by Islands, CensusYear and Sex"..

== Culture and language ==
The island is officially identified as a Gaeltacht (Irish-speaking) area. According to the 2016 census there were 145 people over the age of 3 living on the island, with 62% claiming to be able to speak Irish and 27% saying they spoke Irish daily outside the education system.

The population of the island increases in the summer months as students visit the local Irish Colleges, Coláiste Phobal Chléire and Coláiste Chiaráin. Students stay in local houses or dorms and improve their spoken Irish as part of the immersion courses within the Gaeltacht.

Every first weekend of September, the island hosts the Cape Clear Island International Storytelling Festival. The festival has been running annually since 1994.

== Wildlife ==
Seals, basking sharks and dolphins are often found in the surrounding waters, while sea pinks and honeysuckle are common plants on the land. Cape Clear is home to a lighthouse and a bird observatory. Cape Clear is popular with bird watchers and at certain times of the year is home to many species of migratory birds as its climate is milder than the mainland and thus more attractive. Bird life includes black and common guillemots, cormorants and storm petrels.
