= Sherkin Island =

Island in West Cork, Ireland

Native name: Inis Arcáin
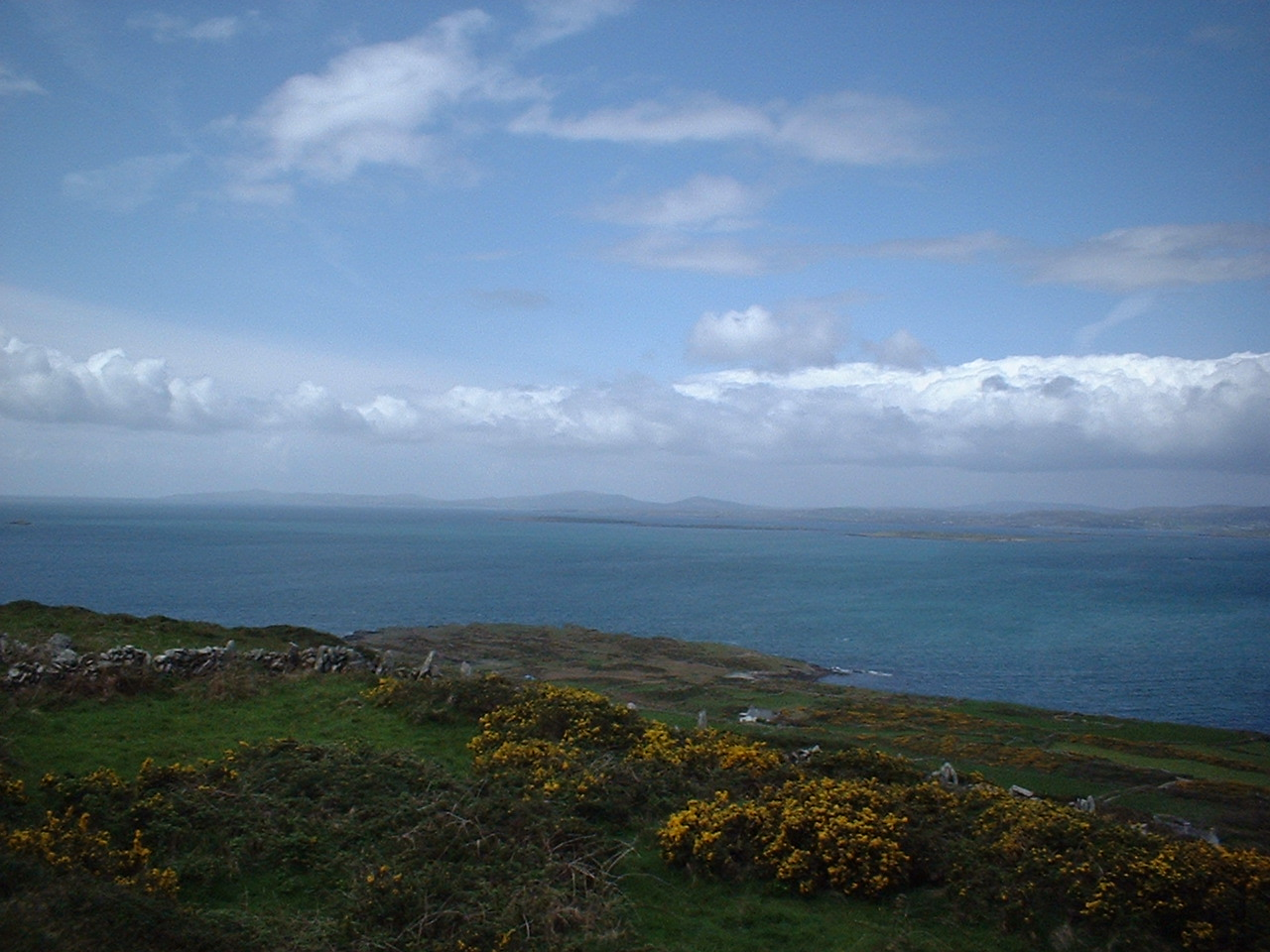
- View from the highest point of Sherkin Island

- Location within island of Ireland

Geography
- Location: Celtic Sea
- Coordinates: 51°28′N 9°25′W
- Area: 5 km^{2} (1.9 sq mi)approx
- Highest elevation: 189.3 m (621.1 ft)

Administration
- Ireland
- Province: Munster
- County: Cork

Demographics
- Population: 110 (2022)

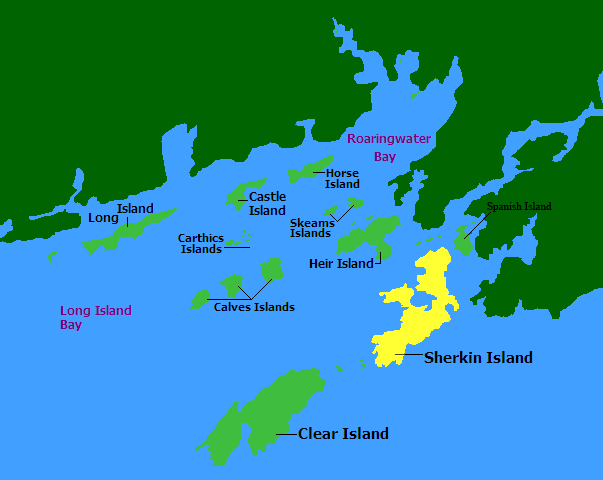
Sherkin Island, West Cork, Ireland

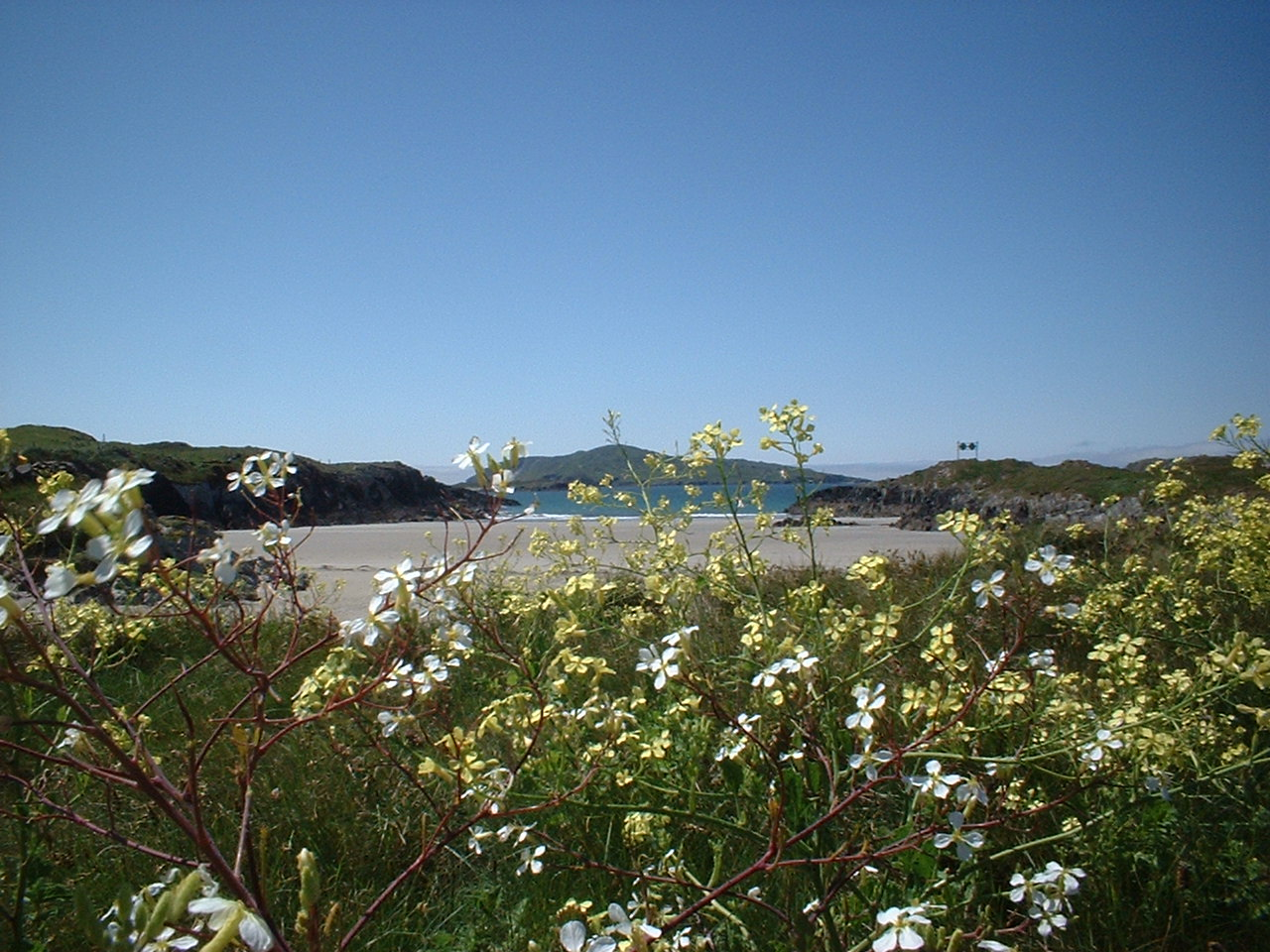
Tráigh Eoghain mhóir, also known as Cow Strand

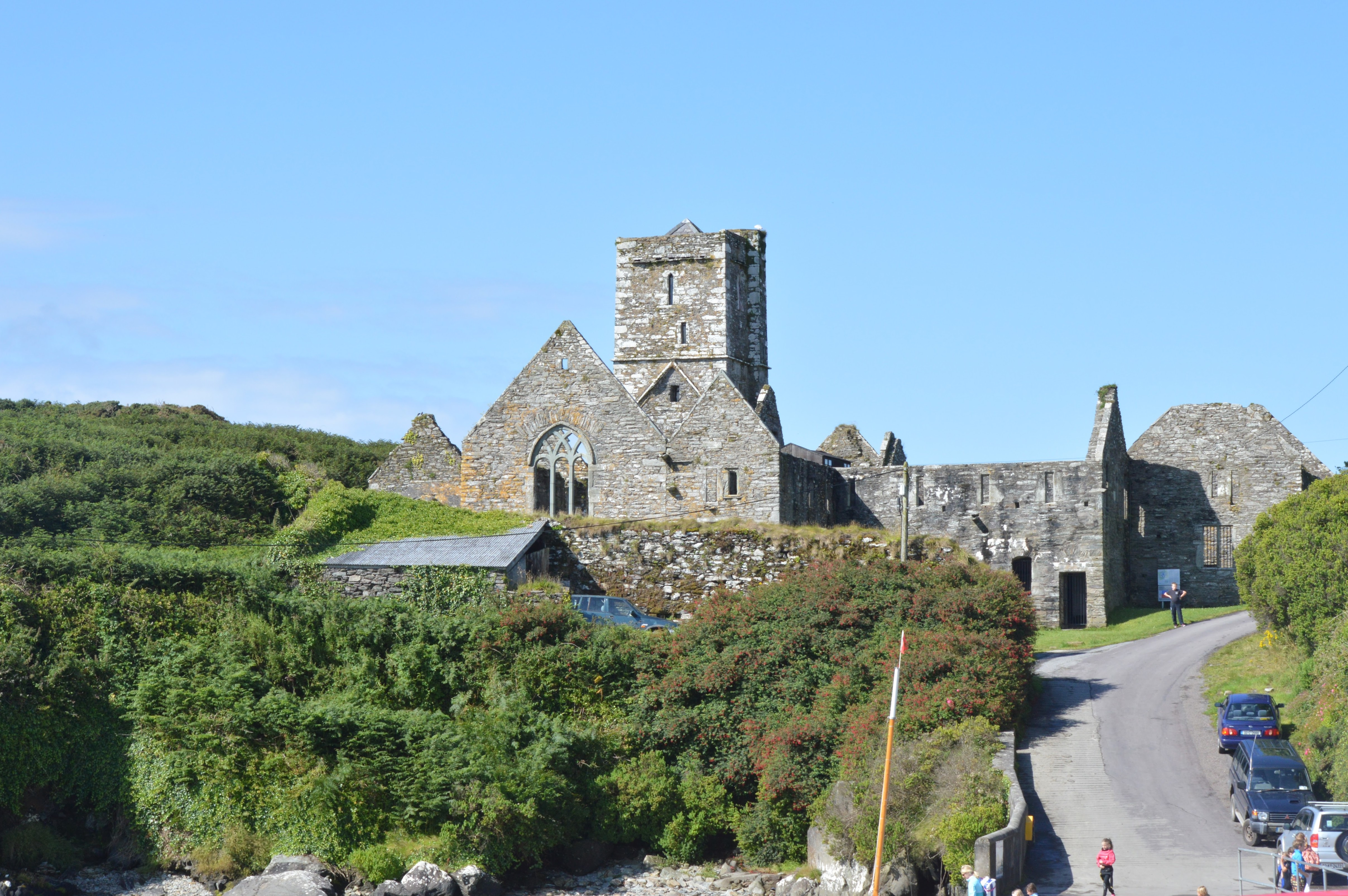
Sherkin Friary

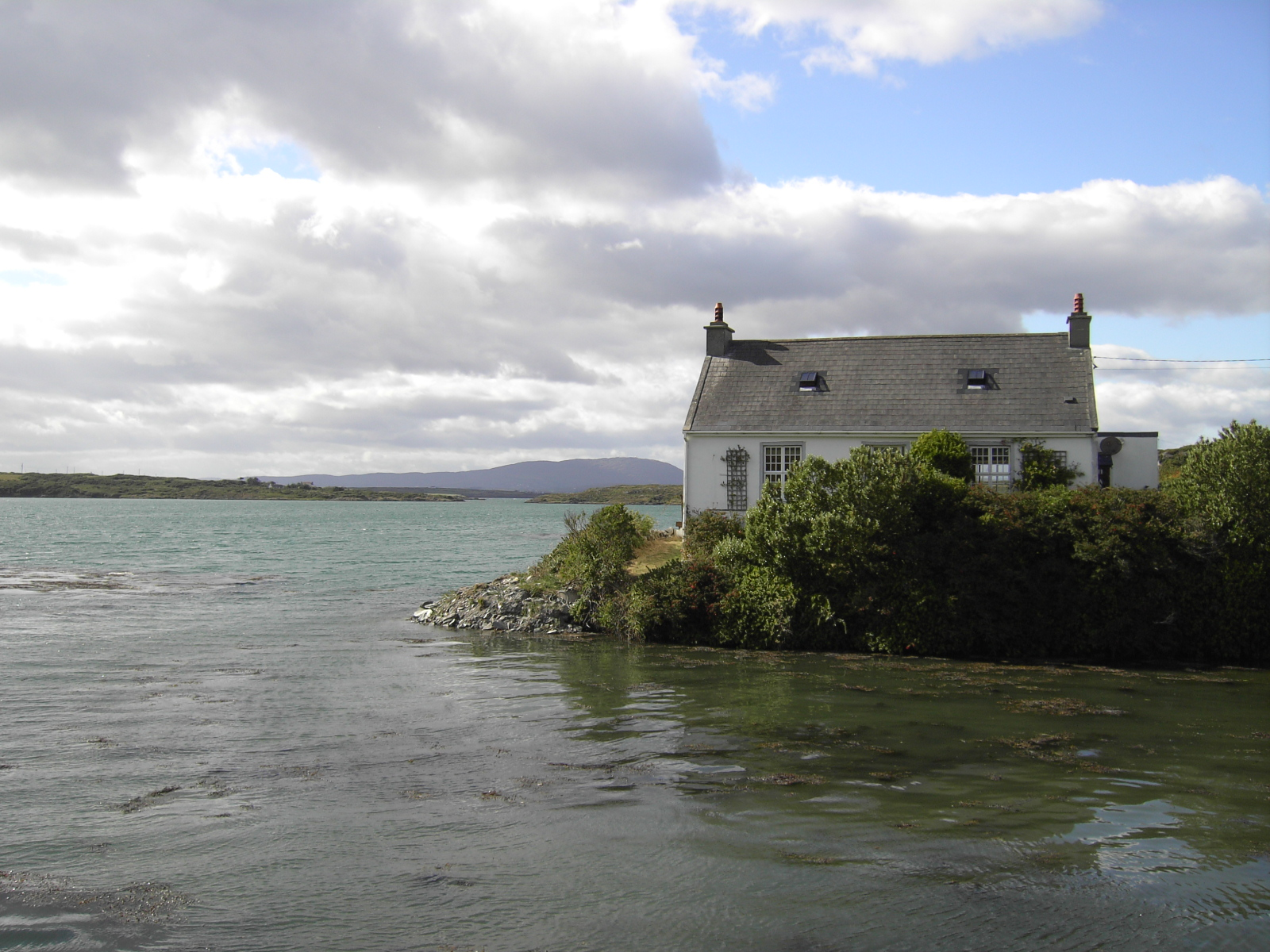
The former girls' national school

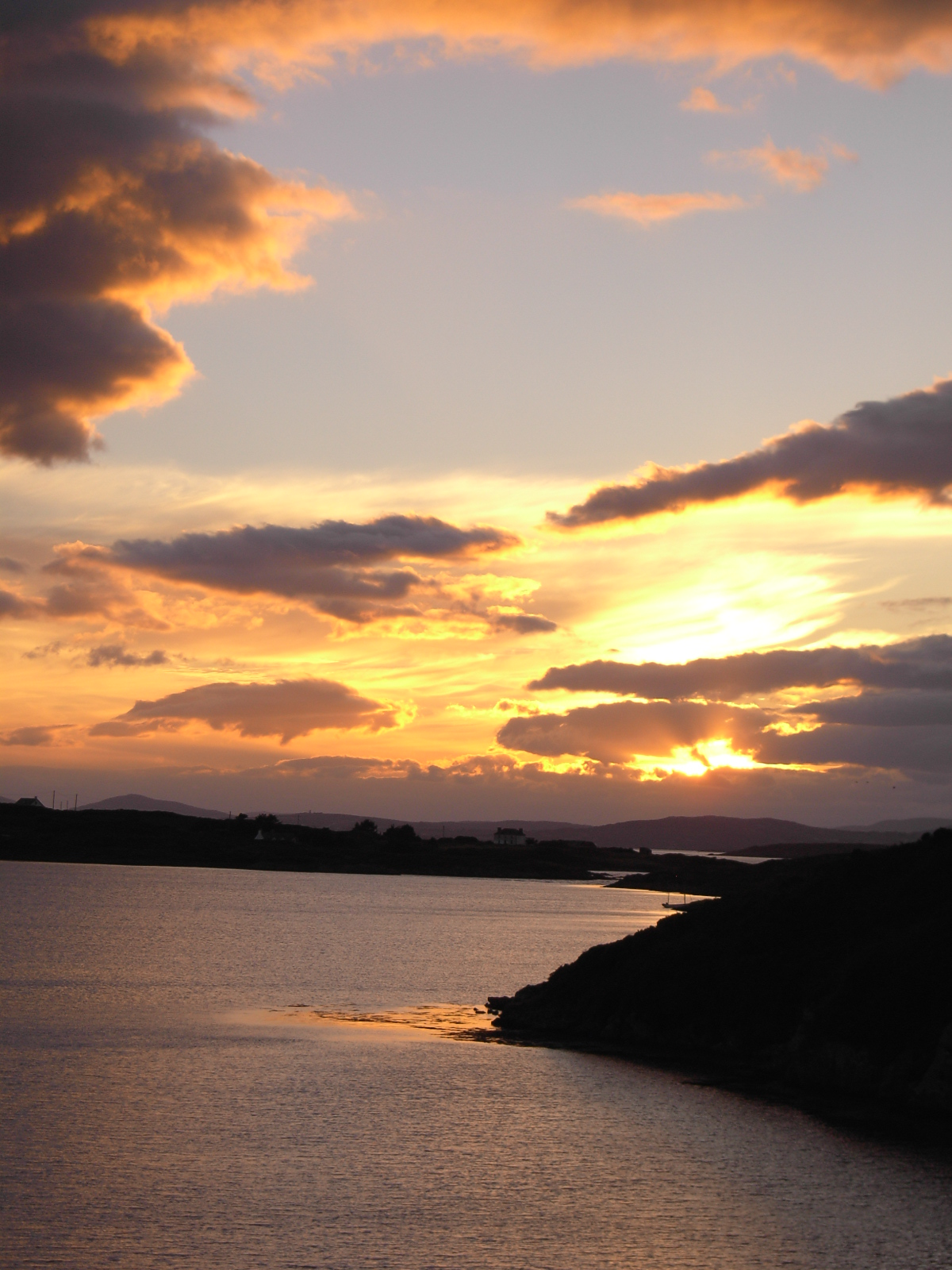
An Cúinne Harbour, Sherkin Island

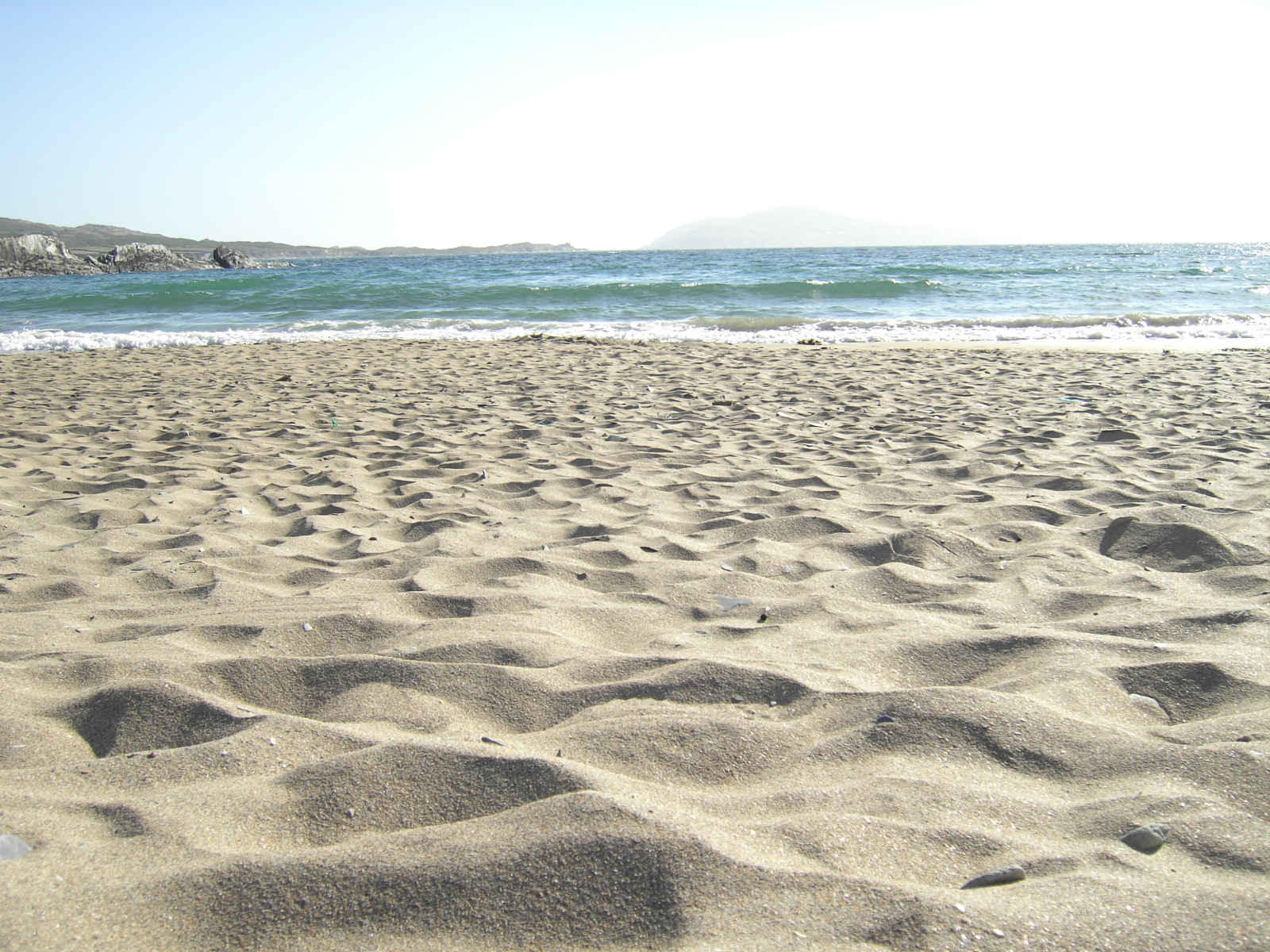
Silver Strand

Sherkin Island, historically called Inisherkin (Irish: Inis Arcáin), lies southwest of County Cork in Ireland alongside other islands of Roaringwater Bay. It had a population of 111 people at the time of the 2016 Census, and measures five kilometres (three miles) long by 2.5 kilometres (1 1/2 miles) wide. The island has one pub, a bed and breakfast, a community centre and a Roman Catholic church.

== Climate ==
Sherkin is one of the most southerly points of Ireland after the Fastnet Rock, Cape Clear, and Brow Head. It is said that when the frost covers the lawns of Baltimore just across the bay, the grass remains unfrosted on the island.

== Population ==
Sherkin once had a population of around 1,000, which started to decline during the Great Irish Famine in the mid-19th century. Now the population is reduced and varies between the summer and the winter months, with increases in summer as people return to holiday houses and tourists arrive. The population of Sherkin include artists, writers, craft workers, musicians, photographers, beekeepers, cattle farmers, mussel and oyster farmers, oceanologists, fishermen, sailors, teachers, and doctors.

Historical population

Year	Pop.	±%
1841	1,131	—
1851	696	−38.5%
1861	571	−18.0%
1871	452	−20.8%
1881	449	−0.7%
1891	403	−10.2%
1901	350	−13.2%
1911	296	−15.4%
1926	248	−16.2%

Year	Pop.	±%
1936	220	−11.3%
1946	176	−20.0%
1951	146	−17.0%
1956	114	−21.9%
1961	101	−11.4%
1966	92	−8.9%
1971	82	−10.9%
1979	82	+0.0%
1981	70	−14.6%

Year	Pop.	±%
1986	87	+24.3%
1991	93	+6.9%
1996	98	+5.4%
2002	129	+31.6%
2006	106	−17.8%
2011	114	+7.5%
2016	111	−2.6%
2022	110	−0.9%

Sources: 1841-2006 Central Statistics Office. "CNA17: Population by Off Shore Island, Sex and Year". CSO.ie. 2011-2016 "Populated off-shore islands". chg.gov.ie.

== Transport ==
Sherkin is served year-round by a ferry service operating from the port of Baltimore.

The roads on Sherkin are narrow and maintained by Cork County Council. Most of the cars on the island are old and unsuitable for use on the mainland. Given the size of the island, many residents also walk or cycle. The island also has a bus service which primarily transports people to and from the ferry.

== History ==
There are a number of archaeological remains on Sherkin. A franciscan friary, known locally as the Abbey, stands above Abbey strand, where the pier is. The seat of the O'Driscoll Clan was Dún na Long. These two buildings were heavily damaged in 1537 when citizens of Waterford invaded the island after a dispute over a seized and plundered ship. Sherkin has an automated lighthouse, maintained by locals. It is situated at Barrack Point and dates from 1835. The lighthouse marks the southern entrance to Baltimore Harbour, along with the Baltimore Beacon. On the south-western side of the island there is a functioning Roman Catholic church. The main historic sites include:

- Promontory fort – Celtic Iron Age – 600 BC – 400 AD
- Franciscan friary – Medieval – 1460 AD
- O'Driscoll Castle – Medieval – post 1200 AD

== Tourism ==
The ferry to Sherkin sails from Baltimore on the mainland. The island is a tourist destination and it typically takes between 10 and 15 minutes to get to Sherkin from Baltimore. The journey to the neighbouring Gaeltacht island Cape Clear takes on average approximately 40 minutes. A number of Sherkin's residents are active in the fields of art, including crafts, painting and writing. The busiest season starts with school summer holidays when families visit the island.

Visitors can book a sea safari trip around the islands. Once on Sherkin pier, people can visit the Franciscan friary, if it is open. Known locally as "the Abbey", it has a photo exhibition inside and some displays outside.

Sherkin also has camp facilities. Because the island has no local refuse disposal facilities, campers and picnickers are encouraged to bring minimum packaging and take any litter back to the mainland or recycle cans and bottles on Sherkin Pier. Silver Strand is popular for barbecues.

=== Festivals ===
The busiest day of the year coincides with the Sherkin Regatta festival, a rowing regatta usually held in late July or early August. On this day the island is visited by sea rowers and their supporters, with children's activities, music and food stalls. Music festivals are also occasionally held.

Since 2016, Sherkin Island has hosted the Open Ear music festival annually, normally at the start of the summer. The festival focuses on "experimental" and avante garde electronic music.

== Development and infrastructure ==
The island has a local development officer, and a community-based organisation called "Sherkin Island Development Society" (SIDS). Sherkin Island is supplied with mains power from the mainland through a submarine power cable. Another submarine cable from Sherkin supplies power to Cape Clear island.

=== Research ===
Sherkin Island Marine Station is a privately run operation located on the north-west of the island. Founded in 1975, it is mainly involved in gathering baseline marine data, and also produces a number of reports, books and the quarterly 'Sherkin Comment' journal.

== See also ==
- List of abbeys and priories in the Republic of Ireland (County Cork)
- Carbery's Hundred Isles
