= List of acts of the Parliament of the United Kingdom from 1892 =

This is a complete list of acts of the Parliament of the United Kingdom for the year 1892.

Note that the first parliament of the United Kingdom was held in 1801; parliaments between 1707 and 1800 were either parliaments of Great Britain or of Ireland). For acts passed up until 1707, see the list of acts of the Parliament of England and the list of acts of the Parliament of Scotland. For acts passed from 1707 to 1800, see the list of acts of the Parliament of Great Britain. See also the list of acts of the Parliament of Ireland.

For acts of the devolved parliaments and assemblies in the United Kingdom, see the list of acts of the Scottish Parliament, the list of acts of the Northern Ireland Assembly, and the list of acts and measures of Senedd Cymru; see also the list of acts of the Parliament of Northern Ireland.

The number shown after each act's title is its chapter number. Acts passed before 1963 are cited using this number, preceded by the year(s) of the reign during which the relevant parliamentary session was held; thus the Union with Ireland Act 1800 is cited as "39 & 40 Geo. 3 c. 67", meaning the 67th act passed during the session that started in the 39th year of the reign of George III and which finished in the 40th year of that reign. Note that the modern convention is to use Arabic numerals in citations (thus "41 Geo. 3" rather than "41 Geo. III"). Acts of the last session of the Parliament of Great Britain and the first session of the Parliament of the United Kingdom are both cited as "41 Geo. 3". Acts passed from 1963 onwards are simply cited by calendar year and chapter number.

All modern acts have a short title, e.g. the Local Government Act 2003. Some earlier acts also have a short title given to them by later acts, such as by the Short Titles Act 1896.

== 55 & 56 Vict. ==
The seventh session of the 24th Parliament of the United Kingdom, which met from 9 February 1892 until 28 June 1892.

=== Public general acts ===
Short title	Citation	Royal assent
Long title
Millbank Prison Act 1892	55 & 56 Vict. c. 1	29 March 1892
An Act to transfer the site of Millbank Prison to the management of the Commissioners of Works.
Army (Annual) Act 1892 (repealed)	55 & 56 Vict. c. 2	29 March 1892
An Act to provide, during twelve months, for the Discipline and Regulation of the Army. (Repealed by Statute Law Revision Act 1908 (8 Edw. 7. c. 49), Statute Law Revision Act 1953 (2 & 3 Eliz. 2. c. 5) and Revision of the Army and Air Force Acts (Transitional Provisions) Act 1955 (3 & 4 Eliz. 2. c. 20))
Consolidated Fund (No. 1) Act 1892 (repealed)	55 & 56 Vict. c. 3	29 March 1892
An Act to apply certain sums out of the Consolidated Fund to the service of the years ending on the thirty-first day of March one thousand eight hundred and ninety-one, one thousand eight hundred and ninety-two, and one thousand eight hundred and ninety-three. (Repealed by Statute Law Revision Act 1908 (8 Edw. 7. c. 49))
Betting and Loans (Infants) Act 1892	55 & 56 Vict. c. 4	29 March 1892
An Act to render Penal the inciting Infants to Betting or Wagering or to borrowing Money. (Repealed for England and Wales by Minors' Contracts Act 1987 (c. 13) and for Scotland by Age of Legal Capacity (Scotland) Act 1991 (c. 50))
Poor Law (Ireland) Act 1892 (repealed)	55 & 56 Vict. c. 5	20 May 1892
An Act to amend the Poor Law (Ireland) Acts. (Repealed by Children and Young Persons Act (Northern Ireland) 1950 (c. 5 (N.I.)))
Colonial Probates Act 1892	55 & 56 Vict. c. 6	20 May 1892
An Act to provide for the Recognition in the United Kingdom of Probates and Letters of Administration granted in British Possessions.
Labourers (Ireland) Act 1892 (repealed)	55 & 56 Vict. c. 7	20 May 1892
An Act to amend the Labourers (Ireland) Acts for the purpose of providing increased Allotments of Land for the Agricultural Labourers in Ireland. (Repealed by Statute Law Revision (Northern Ireland) Act 1954 (c. 35 (N.I.)))
Hares Preservation Act 1892	55 & 56 Vict. c. 8	20 May 1892
An Act to enact a Close Time for Hares during the Breeding Season. (Repealed for Scotland by Wildlife and Natural Environment (Scotland) Act 2011 (asp 6))
Gaming Act 1892 (repealed)	55 & 56 Vict. c. 9	20 May 1892
An Act to amend the Act of the eighth and ninth Victoria, chapter one hundred and nine, intituled "An Act to amend the Law concerning Games and Wagers." (Note: Gaming Act 1845 (8 & 9 Vict. c. 109)) (Repealed by Gambling Act 2005 (c. 19))
Short Titles Act 1892 (repealed)	55 & 56 Vict. c. 10	20 May 1892
An Act to facilitate the Citation of sundry Acts of Parliament. (Repealed by Short Titles Act 1896 (59 & 60 Vict. c. 14))
Mortmain and Charitable Uses Act Amendment Act 1892 (repealed)	55 & 56 Vict. c. 11	20 June 1892
An Act to amend the Mortmain and Charitable Uses Act, 1888. (Note: Mortmain and Charitable Uses Act 1888 (51 & 52 Vict. c. 42)) (Repealed by Charities Act 1960 (8 & 9 Eliz. 2. c. 58))
Roads and Bridges (Scotland) Amendment Act 1892 (repealed)	55 & 56 Vict. c. 12	20 June 1892
An Act to amend the Law in regard to Roads and Bridges in Scotland. (Repealed by Roads (Scotland) Act 1984 (c. 54))
Conveyancing and Law of Property Act 1892	55 & 56 Vict. c. 13	20 June 1892
An Act to amend the Conveyancing and Law of Property Act, 1881. (Note: Conveyancing and Law of Property Act 1881 (44 & 45 Vict. c. 41)) (Repealed for England and Wales by Law of Property Act 1925 (15 & 16 Geo. 5. c. 20))
Indian Councils Act 1892 (repealed)	55 & 56 Vict. c. 14	20 June 1892
An Act to amend the Indian Councils Act, 1861. (Note: Indian Councils Act 1861 (24 & 25 Vict. c. 67)) (Repealed by Government of India Act 1915 (5 & 6 Geo. 5. c. 61))
Charity Inquiries (Expenses) Act 1892 (repealed)	55 & 56 Vict. c. 15	20 June 1892
An Act to authorise the Councils of Counties and County Boroughs to contribute to the Expenses of Inquiries into certain Charities. (Repealed by Charities Act 1960 (8 & 9 Eliz. 2. c. 58))
Customs and Inland Revenue Act 1892 (repealed)	55 & 56 Vict. c. 16	20 June 1892
An Act to grant and alter certain Duties of Customs and Inland Revenue, and to amend the Law relating to Customs and Inland Revenue. (Repealed by Statute Law Revision Act 1908 (8 Edw. 7. c. 49))
Sheriff Courts (Scotland) Extracts Act 1892	55 & 56 Vict. c. 17	20 June 1892
An Act to simplify the Forms of Extracts of Decrees in the Sheriff Courts of Scotland.
Weights and Measures (Purchase) Act 1892 (repealed)	55 & 56 Vict. c. 18	20 June 1892
An Act for authorising County and Borough Councils to purchase Franchises of Weights and Measures. (Repealed by Weights and Measures Act 1963 (c. 31))
Statute Law Revision Act 1892 (repealed)	55 & 56 Vict. c. 19	20 June 1892
An Act for further promoting the Revision of the Statute Law by repealing Enactments which have ceased to be in force or have become unnecessary. (Repealed by Statute Law (Repeals) Act 1998 (c. 43))
Consolidated Fund (No. 2) Act 1892 (repealed)	55 & 56 Vict. c. 20	20 June 1892
An Act to apply a sum out of the Consolidated Fund to the service of the year ending on the thirty-first day of March one thousand eight hundred and ninety-three. (Repealed by Statute Law Revision Act 1908 (8 Edw. 7. c. 49))
High Court of Justiciary (Scotland) Act 1892 (repealed)	55 & 56 Vict. c. 21	20 June 1892
An Act to regulate the sittings of the High Court of Justiciary in Scotland. (Repealed by Statute Law (Repeals) Act 1989 (c. 43))
Housing of the Working Classes Act 1890, Amendment (Scotland) Act 1892 (repealed)	55 & 56 Vict. c. 22	20 June 1892
An Act to amend the Housing of the Working Classes Act, 1890, (Note: Housing of the Working Classes Act 1890 (53 & 54 Vict. c. 70)) as to Scotland. (Repealed by Housing of the Working Classes Act 1890 Amendment (Scotland) Act 1896 (59 & 60 Vict. c. 31))
Foreign Marriage Act 1892	55 & 56 Vict. c. 23	27 June 1892
An Act to consolidate Enactments relating to the Marriage of British Subjects outside the United Kingdom. (Repealed for England and Wales and Scotland by Marriage (Same Sex Couples) Act 2013 (c. 30))
Post Office Act 1892 (repealed)	55 & 56 Vict. c. 24	27 June 1892
An Act to amend the Post Office Act, 1891, (Note: Post Office Act 1891 (54 & 55 Vict. c. 46)) in relation to its application to Scotland, and to apply that Act to the Isle of Man and to the Channel Islands. (Repealed by Post Office Act 1908 (8 Edw. 7. c. 48))
Taxes (Regulation of Remuneration) Amendment Act 1892 (repealed)	55 & 56 Vict. c. 25	27 June 1892
An Act to amend the Taxes (Regulation of Remuneration) Act, 1891. (Note: Taxes (Regulation of Remuneration) Act 1891 (54 & 55 Vict. c. 13)) (Repealed by Finance Act 1963 (c. 25))
National Debt (Conversion of Exchequer Bonds) Act 1892 (repealed)	55 & 56 Vict. c. 26	27 June 1892
An Act to make provision respecting Advances made by the National Debt Commissioners under the National Debt (Redemption) Act, 1889. (Note: National Debt (Redemption) Act 1889 (52 & 53 Vict. c. 4)) (Repealed by Finance Act 1899 (62 & 63 Vict. c. 9))
Parliamentary Deposits and Bonds Act 1892	55 & 56 Vict. c. 27	27 June 1892
An Act to authorise the release of certain Deposits, and the cancellation of certain Bonds, made or given to secure the performance of undertakings authorised by Parliament. (Repealed for England and Wales and Scotland by Administration of Justice Act 1965 (c. 2))
Isle of Man Customs Act 1892 (repealed)	55 & 56 Vict. c. 28	27 June 1892
An Act to amend the Law respecting the Customs Duties in the Isle of Man. (Repealed by Isle of Man (Customs) Act 1895 (58 & 59 Vict. c. 38))
Technical and Industrial Institutions Act 1892	55 & 56 Vict. c. 29	27 June 1892
An Act to facilitate the Acquisition and Holding of Land by Institutions for promoting Technical and Industrial Instruction and Training. (Repealed for Northern Ireland by Education (Northern Ireland) Order 1980 (SI 1980/1958 (N.I. 16)))
Alkali, &c. Works Regulation Act 1892 (repealed)	55 & 56 Vict. c. 30	27 June 1892
An Act to amend the Alkali, &c. Works Regulation Act, 1881. (Note: Alkali, &c. Works Regulation Act 1881 (44 & 45 Vict. c. 37)) (Repealed by Alkali, &c. Works Regulation Act 1906 (6 Edw. 7. c. 14))
Small Holdings Act 1892	55 & 56 Vict. c. 31	27 June 1892
An Act to facilitate the acquisition of small agricultural holdings. (Repealed for England and Wales by Small Holdings and Allotments Act 1908 (8 Edw. 7. c. 36))
Clergy Discipline Act 1892 (repealed)	55 & 56 Vict. c. 32	27 June 1892
An Act for better enforcing Discipline in the Case of Crimes and other Offences against Morality committed by Clergymen. (Repealed by Ecclesiastical Jurisdiction Measure 1963 (No. 1))
Appropriation Act 1892 (repealed)	55 & 56 Vict. c. 33	27 June 1892
An Act to apply a sum out of the Consolidated Fund to the service of the year ending on the thirty-first day of March one thousand eight hundred and ninety-three, and to appropriate the Supplies granted in this Session of Parliament. (Repealed by Statute Law Revision Act 1908 (8 Edw. 7. c. 49))
Naval Knights of Windsor (Dissolution) Act 1892 (repealed)	55 & 56 Vict. c. 34	27 June 1892
An Act for dissolving the Corporation styled the Naval Knights of Windsor of the foundation of Samuel Travers, Esquire, and for regulating the application of the property thereof, and for applying and amending the Greenwich Hospital Acts. (Repealed by Armed Forces Act 1976 (c. 52))
Colonial Stock Act 1892 (repealed)	55 & 56 Vict. c. 35	27 June 1892
An Act to amend the Colonial Stock Act, 1877, (Note: Colonial Stock Act 1877 (40 & 41 Vict. c. 59)) so far as regards the mode of transfer of Stock to which that Act applies. (Repealed by Statute Law (Repeals) Act 1998 (c. 43))
Forged Transfers Act 1892	55 & 56 Vict. c. 36	27 June 1892
An Act to remove doubts as to the meaning of the Forged Transfers Act 1891. (Note: Forged Transfers Act 1891 (54 & 55 Vict. c. 43))
Merchant Shipping Act 1892 (repealed)	55 & 56 Vict. c. 37	27 June 1892
An Act to amend the Merchant Shipping Acts. (Repealed by Merchant Shipping Act 1894 (57 & 58 Vict. c. 60))
Police Returns Act 1892 (repealed)	55 & 56 Vict. c. 38	27 June 1892
An Act to alter the period for which certain Police Returns are required to be made. (Repealed by Police Act 1964 (c. 48))
National Debt (Stockholders Relief) Act 1892	55 & 56 Vict. c. 39	27 June 1892
An Act to amend the National Debt Act, 1870. (Note: National Debt Act 1870 (33 & 34 Vict. c. 71))
Superannuation Act 1892 (repealed)	55 & 56 Vict. c. 40	27 June 1892
An Act to amend the Acts relating to Superannuation Allowances and Gratuities to Persons in the Public Service so far as respects the computation of successive Service in different Offices where not all subject to the Superannuation Acts, 1834 to 1887, and as respects the application of Section Six of the Superannuation Act, 1887, (Note: Superannuation Act 1887 (50 & 51 Vict. c. 67)) to Employments of Profit under the Government of India. (Repealed by Superannuation (Amendment) Act 1965 (c. 10))
Boards of Management of Poor Law District Schools (Ireland) Act 1892 (repealed)	55 & 56 Vict. c. 41	27 June 1892
An Act to provide for expenses incurred by Members of Boards of Management of Poor Law District Schools in Ireland. (Repealed by Children and Young Persons Act (Northern Ireland) 1950 (c. 5 (N.I.)))
Irish Education Act 1892 (repealed)	55 & 56 Vict. c. 42	27 June 1892
An Act to improve National Education in Ireland. (Repealed by Education Act (Northern Ireland) 1923 (13 & 14 Geo. 5. c. 21 (N.I.)))
Military Lands Act 1892	55 & 56 Vict. c. 43	27 June 1892
An Act to consolidate and amend certain enactments relating to the acquisition of land for military purposes.
Railway and Canal Traffic Act 1892 (repealed)	55 & 56 Vict. c. 44	27 June 1892
An Act to amend the Railway and Canal Traffic Act, 1888. (Note: Railway and Canal Traffic Act 1888 (51 & 52 Vict. c. 25)) (Repealed by Statute Law Revision Act 1959 (7 & 8 Eliz. 2. c. 68))
Land Commissioners (Ireland) Salaries Act 1892 (repealed)	55 & 56 Vict. c. 45	27 June 1892
An Act to provide for the increase of the Salaries of certain Land Commissioners in Ireland, and for other purposes connected with the Land Commission. (Repealed by Statute Law Revision Act 1908 (8 Edw. 7. c. 49) (Note: Incorrectly cited as "Statute Law Revision Act 1898" in the Chronological Table of the Statutes.) and Statute Law Revision Act 1953 (2 & 3 Eliz. 2. c. 5))
Ancient Monuments Protection (Ireland) Act 1892 (repealed)	55 & 56 Vict. c. 46	27 June 1892
An Act to amend the Ancient Monuments Protection Act, 1882. (Note: Ancient Monuments Protection Act 1882 (45 & 46 Vict. c. 73)) (Repealed by Ancient Monuments Act (Northern Ireland) 1926 (16 & 17 Geo. 5. c. 12 (N.I.)))
Contagious Diseases (Animals) Act 1892 (repealed)	55 & 56 Vict. c. 47	27 June 1892
An Act to amend the Contagious Diseases (Animals) Acts, 1878 to 1890. (Repealed by Diseases of Animals Act 1894 (57 & 58 Vict. c. 57) (Note: Incorrectly cited as "1894 c. 5" in the Chronological Table of the Statutes.))
Bank Act 1892	55 & 56 Vict. c. 48	27 June 1892
An Act for making further Provision respecting certain Payments to the Banks of England and Ireland, and for other purposes connected with those Banks.
Mauritius Hurricane Loan Act 1892 (repealed)	55 & 56 Vict. c. 49	27 June 1892
An Act to authorise the Treasury to guarantee the Payment of a Loan to be raised by the Government of the Colony of Mauritius. (Repealed by Statute Law Revision Act 1950 (14 Geo. 6. c. 6))
Salmon and Freshwater Fisheries Act 1892 (repealed)	55 & 56 Vict. c. 50	27 June 1892
An Act to amend the Law relating to Salmon and Freshwater Fisheries. (Repealed by Salmon and Freshwater Fisheries Act 1923 (13 & 14 Geo. 5. c. 16))
Education and Local Taxation Account (Scotland) Act 1892 (repealed)	55 & 56 Vict. c. 51	27 June 1892
An Act to make provision in regard to the Distribution and Application of Sums from time to time paid to the Local Taxation (Scotland) Account and in regard to the Pee Grant in Scotland. (Repealed by Local Government (Scotland) Act 1929 (19 & 20 Geo. 5. c. 25))
British Columbia (Loan) Act 1892 (repealed)	55 & 56 Vict. c. 52	27 June 1892
An Act to authorise an Advance to the Government of the Province of British Columbia. (Repealed by Statute Law Revision Act 1950 (14 Geo. 6. c. 6))
Public Libraries Act 1892 (repealed)	55 & 56 Vict. c. 53	27 June 1892
An Act to consolidate and amend the Law relating to Public Libraries. (Repealed by Public Libraries and Museums Act 1964 (c. 75))
Allotments (Scotland) Act 1892 (repealed)	55 & 56 Vict. c. 54	28 June 1892
An Act to facilitate the provision of Allotments for the Labouring Classes in Scotland. (Repealed by Community Empowerment (Scotland) Act 2015 (asp 6))
Burgh Police (Scotland) Act 1892 (repealed)	55 & 56 Vict. c. 55	28 June 1892
An Act for regulating the Police and Sanitary Administration of towns and populous places, and for facilitating the union of Police and Municipal Administration in burghs in Scotland. (Repealed by Local Government (Scotland) Act 1973 (c. 65) and Local Government (Scotland) Act 1978 (c. 4))
Coroners Act 1892 (repealed)	55 & 56 Vict. c. 56	28 June 1892
An Act to amend the Law in relation to the Appointment of Coroners and Deputy Coroners in Comities and Boroughs. (Repealed for England and Wales by Coroners Act 1988 (c. 13) and for Northern Ireland by Coroners Act (Northern Ireland) 1959 (c. 15 (N.I.)))
Private Street Works Act 1892 (repealed)	55 & 56 Vict. c. 57	28 June 1892
An Act to amend the Public Health Acts in relation to Private Street Improvement Expenses. (Repealed by Highways Act 1959 (7 & 8 Eliz. 2. c. 25))
Accumulations Act 1892	55 & 56 Vict. c. 58	28 June 1892
An Act to amend the law respecting accumulations. (Repealed for England and Wales by Law of Property Act 1925 (15 & 16 Geo. 5. c. 20))
Telegraph Act 1892 (repealed)	55 & 56 Vict. c. 59	28 June 1892
An Act to make further provision respecting Telegraphs. (Repealed by Telecommunications Act 1984 (c. 12))
Expiring Laws Continuance Act 1892 (repealed)	55 & 56 Vict. c. 60	28 June 1892
An Act to continue various Expiring Laws. (Repealed by Statute Law Revision Act 1908 (8 Edw. 7. c. 49))
Public Works Loans Act 1892	55 & 56 Vict. c. 61	28 June 1892
An Act to grant Money for the purpose of certain Local Loans, and for other purposes relating to Local Loans.
Shop Hours Act 1892 (repealed)	55 & 56 Vict. c. 62	28 June 1892
An Act to amend the Law relating to the Employment of Young Persons in Shops. (Repealed by Shops Act 1912 (2 & 3 Geo. 5. c. 3))
Technical Instruction Amendment (Scotland) Act 1892 (repealed)	55 & 56 Vict. c. 63	28 June 1892
An Act to explain and amend the Local Taxation (Customs and Excise) Act, 1890, (Note: Local Taxation (Customs and Excise) Act 1890 (53 & 54 Vict. c. 60)) with respect to Contributions for Technical Instruction in Scotland. (Repealed by Education (Scotland) Act 1908 (8 Edw. 7. c. 63))
Witnesses (Public Inquiries) Protection Act 1892	55 & 56 Vict. c. 64	28 June 1892
An Act for the better Protection of Witnesses giving Evidence before any Royal Commission or any Committee of either House of Parliament, or on other Public Inquiries.
Drainage and Improvement of Land (Ireland) Act 1892 (repealed)	55 & 56 Vict. c. 65	28 June 1892
An Act to amend the Law relating to the Drainage and Improvement of Land in Ireland, and for other purposes. (Repealed by Drainage Act (Northern Ireland) 1925 (15 & 16 Geo. 5. c. 24 (N.I.)) and Erne Drainage and Development Act (Northern Ireland) 1950 (c. 15 (N.I.)))

=== Local acts ===
Short title	Citation	Royal assent
Long title
South Yorkshire Junction Railway Act 1892	55 & 56 Vict. c. i	20 May 1892
An Act to amend the Agreement scheduled to and confirmed by the Hull and Barnsley and South Yorkshire Junction Railways Act 1891 (Note: Hull and Barnsley and South Yorkshire Junction Railways Act 1891) and to enable the South Yorkshire Junction Railway Company to raise further money and for other purposes.
Welshpool and Llanfair Railway (Abandonment) Act 1892 (repealed)	55 & 56 Vict. c. ii	20 May 1892
An Act for the abandonment of the Welshpool and Llanfair Railway. (Repealed by Statute Law (Repeals) Act 2013 (c. 2))
City of Glasgow Life Assurance Company Act 1892 (repealed)	55 & 56 Vict. c. iii	20 May 1892
An Act to confer further powers on the City of Glasgow Life Assurance Company and for other purposes. (Repealed by Statute Law (Repeals) Act 1998 (c. 43))
National Penny Bank Limited Act 1892	55 & 56 Vict. c. iv	20 May 1892
An Act for more effectually vesting in the Trustees for the time being of the National Penny Bank Limited Securities and other Property representing Moneys received by the Bank on Deposit Accounts and for other purposes.
East and West India Dock Company Act 1892 (repealed)	55 & 56 Vict. c. v	20 May 1892
An Act to enable the East and West India Dock Company to raise and apply capital in extinguishing or meeting certain liabilities and to amend the scheme of arrangement between the Company and their creditors filed in the High Court and for other purposes. (Repealed by Port of London (Consolidation) Act 1920 (10 & 11 Geo. 5. c. clxxiii))
Royal Bank of Scotland Officers' Widows' Fund (Amendment) Act 1892 (repealed)	55 & 56 Vict. c. vi	20 May 1892
An Act for amending the Royal Bank of Scotland Officers Widows Fund Acts, 1870 (Note: Royal Bank of Scotland Officers' Widows' Fund Act 1870 (33 & 34 Vict. c. xxxvii)) and 1878. (Note: Royal Bank of Scotland Officers Widows Fund (Amendment) Act 1878 (41 & 42 Vict. c. iii)) (Repealed by Royal Bank of Scotland Officers' Widows' Fund Order Confirmation Act 1949 (12, 13 & 14 Geo. 6. c. xiii))
Caledonian Insurance Company's Act 1892 (repealed)	55 & 56 Vict. c. vii	20 May 1892
An Act for enlarging the powers of the Caledonian Insurance Company and for amending the Company's Acts of 1846 (Note: Caledonian Insurance Company Act 1846 (9 & 10 Vict. c. xlv)) and 1880; (Note: Caledonian Insurance Company's Act 1880 (43 & 44 Vict. c. lxviii)) and for other purposes. (Repealed by Caledonian Insurance Company's Act 1923 (13 & 14 Geo. 5. c. xxix))
Railway Passengers Assurance (Consolidation) Act 1892 (repealed)	55 & 56 Vict. c. viii	20 May 1892
An Act to consolidate the Acts relating to the Railway Passengers Assurance Company and to make new provisions for the government of the Company and the management of its affairs and for other purposes. (Repealed by Railway Passengers Assurance (Consolidation) Act 1918 (8 & 9 Geo. 5. c. xiv))
Bristol Gas Company Act 1892	55 & 56 Vict. c. ix	20 May 1892
An Act to authorise the Bristol Gas Company to purchase lands to erect works for the storage of gas to sell certain lands and for other purposes.
East Indian Railway Company Sinking Fund Act 1892 (repealed)	55 & 56 Vict. c. x	20 May 1892
An Act to authorise the East Indian Railway Company to establish and maintain a sinking fund for the benefit of the deferred annuity holders a sinking fund for the benefit of the annuitants of Class A to amend the East Indian Railway Company Purchase Act 1879 (Note: East Indian Railway Company Purchase Act 1879 (42 & 43 Vict. c. ccvi)) and for other purposes. (Repealed by Statute Law (Repeals) Act 2013 (c. 2))
Cathcart District Railway (Extension of Time) Act 1892	55 & 56 Vict. c. xi	20 May 1892
An Act to extend the time for the completion of the Railway authorised by the Cathcart District Railway Act 1887. (Note: Cathcart District Railway Act 1887 (50 & 51 Vict. c. cxxix))
Clyde, Ardrishaig and Crinan Railway (Abandonment) Act 1892 (repealed)	55 & 56 Vict. c. xii	20 May 1892
An Act for the abandonment of the Clyde Ardrishaig and Crinan Railway. (Repealed by Statute Law (Repeals) Act 2013 (c. 2))
Barrow-in-Furness Corporation Water Act 1892	55 & 56 Vict. c. xiii	20 May 1892
An Act to empower the Corporation of Barrow-in-Furness to make additional Waterworks and for other purposes.
Neuchatel Asphalte Company Act 1892	55 & 56 Vict. c. xiv	20 May 1892
An Act to regulate the Capital of the Neuchatel Asphalte Company Limited and for other purposes,
North British and Mercantile Insurance Company Act 1892 (repealed)	55 & 56 Vict. c. xv	20 May 1892
An Act to extend the objects of and confer further powers on the North British and Mercantile Insurance Company and to amend in divers respects the Acts relating to the Company. (Repealed by North British and Mercantile Insurance Company's Act 1920 (10 & 11 Geo. 5. c. cxxxii))
Felixstowe and Bawdsey Ferry Railway (Abandonment) Act 1892 (repealed)	55 & 56 Vict. c. xvi	20 May 1892
An Act for the abandonment of the Railways authorised by the Felixstowe and Bawdsey Ferry Railway Act 1887. (Note: Felixstowe and Bawdsey Ferry Railway Act 1887 (50 & 51 Vict. c. xxvi)) (Repealed by Statute Law (Repeals) Act 2013 (c. 2))
Scottish Union and National Insurance Company's Act 1892 (repealed)	55 & 56 Vict. c. xvii	20 May 1892
An Act for conferring further powers on the Scottish Union and National Insurance Company, and for amending the Acts which regulate the Company; and for other purposes. (Repealed by Scottish Union and National Insurance Company's Act 1956 (4 & 5 Eliz. 2. c. lxv))
Rathmines and Rathgar Township Act 1892	55 & 56 Vict. c. xviii	20 May 1892
An Act to amend and define the borrowing powers of the Rathmines and Rathgar Improvement Commissioners to enable the Commissioners to borrow an additional sum of money and for other purposes.
Oxford Gas Act 1892	55 & 56 Vict. c. xix	20 May 1892
An Act for the granting of further powers to the Oxford Gas Light and Coke Company.
Holsworthy and Bude Railway (Abandonment) Act 1892 (repealed)	55 & 56 Vict. c. xx	20 May 1892
An Act for the abandonment of the Holsworthy and Bade Railway. (Repealed by Statute Law (Repeals) Act 2013 (c. 2))
Ardrossan Harbour Act 1892 (repealed)	55 & 56 Vict. c. xxi	20 May 1892
An Act to empower the Ardrossan Harbour Company to raise further moneys. (Repealed by Ardrossan Harbour Revision Order 1977 (SI 1977/933))
Lancaster Marsh Act 1892 (repealed)	55 & 56 Vict. c. xxii	20 May 1892
An Act for conferring further powers on the Corporation of Lancaster with respect to Lancaster Marsh. (Repealed by County of Lancashire Act 1984 (c. xxi))
Stourport Bridge Transfer Act 1892 (repealed)	55 & 56 Vict. c. xxiii	20 May 1892
An Act to provide for the transfer of Stourport Bridge at Stourport in the County of Worcester to the County Council of that County and for other purposes. (Repealed by Statute Law (Repeals) Act 1998 (c. 43))
Liverpool United Gaslight Company Act 1892	55 & 56 Vict. c. xxiv	20 May 1892
An Act to enable the Liverpool United Gaslight Company to erect Works for the Storage of Gas on additional Lands and to confer further powers on the Company.
Llanarmon District Mines Drainage Act 1892	55 & 56 Vict. c. xxv	20 May 1892
An Act to effect the drainage of certain Mines and Mineral Lands in the Counties of Flint and Denbigh and for other purposes.
Southborough Local Board (Gas) Act 1892	55 & 56 Vict. c. xxvi	20 May 1892
An Act to empower the Local Board for the district of Southborough in the county of Kent to supply their district and other places with gas and for other purposes.
Tees Conservancy Act 1892	55 & 56 Vict. c. xxvii	20 May 1892
An Act for conferring further powers on the Tees Conservancy Commissioners with respect to the improvement and regulation of the River Tees for enabling the Commissioners to raise further moneys for amending the Tees Conservancy Acts and for other purposes.
Dundee Suburban Railway Act 1892	55 & 56 Vict. c. xxviii	20 May 1892
An Act to extend the time for the completion of the Railways authorised by the Dundee Suburban Railway Act 1884 (Note: Dundee Suburban Railway Act 1884 (47 & 48 Vict. c. clxxii)) and the Dundee Suburban Railway Act 1889 (Note: Dundee Suburban Railway Act 1889 (52 & 53 Vict. c. civ)) and for other purposes.
John Crossley and Sons, Limited Act 1892	55 & 56 Vict. c. xxix	20 May 1892
An Act to confirm certain special resolutions for dividing the Share Capital of John Crossley and Sons Limited into Preference Shares and Ordinary Shares and for other purposes.
Borough Market (Southwark) Act 1892	55 & 56 Vict. c. xxx	20 May 1892
An Act to enable the Trustees of the Borough Market (Southwark) to borrow money and for other purposes.
Pilotage Order Confirmation Act 1892	55 & 56 Vict. c. xxxi	20 May 1892
An Act to confirm a Provisional Order made by the Board of Trade under the Merchant Shipping Act Amendment Act, 1862, (Note: Merchant Shipping Act Amendment Act 1862 (25 & 26 Vict. c. 63)) relating to the Pilotage District of Swansea.
	Swansea Pilotage Order 1892 Order for exempting Masters and Owners of all Vessels inward bound to Swansea Harbour from Compulsory Pilotage.	
Local Government Board (Ireland) Provisional Order Confirmation (No. 1) Act 1892	55 & 56 Vict. c. xxxii	20 May 1892
An Act to confirm a Provisional Order made by the Local Government Board for Ireland under the Public Health (Ireland) Act, 1878, (Note: Public Health (Ireland) Act 1878 (41 & 42 Vict. c. 52)) relating to the Town of Larne.
	Larne (Town) Provisional Order 1892 Town of Larne. Provisional Order.	
Pier and Harbour Orders Confirmation (No. 1) Act 1892	55 & 56 Vict. c. xxxiii	20 May 1892
An Act to confirm certain Provisional Orders made by the Board of Trade under the General Pier and Harbour Act, 1861, (Note: General Pier and Harbour Act 1861 (24 & 25 Vict. c. 45)) relating to Birchington, Colwyn Bay, Llandudno, Penarth, and Plymouth.
	Birchington-on-Sea Pier Order 1892 Order for the Construction, Maintenance, and Regulation of a Pier and Esplanade at Birchington-on-Sea, in the County of Kent.	
	Colwyn Bay Pier Order 1892 Order for the Construction and Maintenance of a Pier and Works at Llandrillo yn Rhôs, near Colwyn Bay, in the County of Denbigh.	
	Llandudno Pier Order 1892 Order for altering certain of the Rates or Tolls taken at the Llandudno Pier and Landing Stage.	
	Penarth Promenade and Pier Order 1892 Order for the Construction, Maintenance, and Regulation of a Pier at Penarth in the County of Glamorgan.	
	Plymouth (Phœnix Wharf) Pier Order 1892 Order for the Construction of a Pier and other Works at Phœnix Wharf, in the Borough of Plymouth, in the County of Devon.	
Samuel Sunderland Charity Scheme Confirmation Act 1892	55 & 56 Vict. c. xxxiv	20 May 1892
An Act to confirm a Scheme of the Charity Commissioners for the Application or Management of the Charity of Samuel Sunderland, in the Parish of Bingley, in the West Riding of the County of York.
	Scheme for the Application or Management of the Charity of Samuel Sunderland, in the Parish of Bingley, in the West Riding of the County of York.	
St. Austell Valleys Railway and Dock (Abandonment) Act 1892 (repealed)	55 & 56 Vict. c. xxxv	20 June 1892
An Act for the abandonment of the St. Austell Valleys Railway and Dock. (Repealed by Statute Law (Repeals) Act 2013 (c. 2))
Electric Lighting Order Confirmation (No. 1) Act 1892 (repealed)	55 & 56 Vict. c. xxxvi	20 June 1892
An Act to confirm a Provisional Order made by the Board of Trade under the Electric Lighting Acts, 1882 to 1890, relating to the Burgh of Govan. (Repealed by South of Scotland Electricity Order Confirmation Act 1956 (4 & 5 Eliz. 2. c. xciv))
	Govan Electric Lighting Order 1882 Provisional Order granted by the Board of Trade under the Electric Lighting Acts 1882 to 1890 to the Commissioners of Police of the Burgh of Govan in respect of the Burgh of Govan.	
Electric Lighting Orders Confirmation (No. 2) Act 1892	55 & 56 Vict. c. xxxvii	20 June 1892
An Act to confirm certain Provisional Orders made by the Board of Trade under the Electric Lighting Acts, 1882 (Note: Electric Lighting Act 1882 (45 & 46 Vict. c. 56)) and 1888, (Note: Electric Lighting Act 1888 (51 & 52 Vict. c. 12)) relating to Aberystwyth, Ashton-under-Lyne Halifax, Harwich, Limerick, and Maidstone.
	Aberystwyth Electric Lighting Order 1892 Provisional Order granted by the Board of Trade, under the Electric Lighting Acts 1882, and 1888, to the Mayor, Aldermen, and Burgesses of the Borough of Aberystwyth, in the County of Cardigan.	
	Ashton-under-Lyne (Corporation) Electric Lighting Order 1892 Provisional Order granted by the Board of Trade, under the Electric Lighting Acts 1882, and 1888, to the Mayor, Aldermen, and Burgesses of the Borough of Ashton-under-Lyne, in the County of Lancaster.	
	Halifax Corporation Electric Lighting Order 1892 Provisional Order granted by the Board of Trade, under the Electric Lighting Acts 1882, and 1888, to the Mayor, Aldermen, and Burgesses of the County Borough of Halifax.	
	Harwich (Corporation) Electric Lighting Order 1892 Provisional Order granted by the Board of Trade, under the Electric Lighting Acts 1882, and 1888, to the Mayor, Aldermen, and Burgesses of the Borough of Harwich, in the County of Essex.	
	Limerick Electric Lighting Order 1892 Provisional Order granted by the Board of Trade, under the Electric Lighting Acts 1882, and 1888, to the Mayor, Aldermen, and Burgesses of the Borough of Limerick.	
	Maidstone Electric Lighting Order 1892 Provisional Order granted by the Board of Trade, under the Electric Lighting Acts 1882, and 1888, to the Mayor, Aldermen, and Burgesses of the Borough of Maidstone, in the County of Kent.	
Electric Lighting Orders Confirmation (No. 3) Act 1892	55 & 56 Vict. c. xxxviii	20 June 1892
An Act to confirm certain Provisional Orders made by the Board of Trade under the Electric Lighting Acts, 1882 and 1888, relating to Kilkenny, Newbury, Sutton (Surrey), West Ham, and Woking (Horsell and Chertsey).
	Kilkenny Electric Lighting Order 1892 Provisional Order granted by the Board of Trade, under the Electric Lighting Acts 1882, and 1888, to the Mayor, Aldermen, and Burgesses of the Municipal Borough of Kilkenny.	
	Newbury Electric Lighting Order 1892 Provisional Order granted by the Board of Trade, under the Electric Lighting Acts 1882, and 1888, to the Mayor, Aldermen, and Burgesses of the Borough of Newbury.	
	Sutton (Surrey) Electric Lighting Order 1892 Provisional Order granted by the Board of Trade, under the Electric Lighting Acts 1882, and 1888, to the Sutton (Surrey) Local Board.	
	West Ham (Corporation) Electric Lighting Order 1892 Provisional Order granted by the Board of Trade, under the Electric Lighting Acts 1882, and 1888, to the Mayor, Aldermen, and Burgesses of the County Borough of West Ham.	
	Woking Electric Supply Co. Electric Lighting (Horsell and Chertsey) Order 1892 Provisional Order granted by the Board of Trade, under the Electric Lighting Acts 1882, and 1888, to the Woking Electric Supply Company, Limited.	
Railway Rates and Charges, No. 1 (Abbotsbury Railway, &c.), Order Confirmation Act 1892 (repealed)	55 & 56 Vict. c. xxxix	20 June 1892
An Act to confirm a Provisional Order made by the Board of Trade under the Railway and Canal Traffic Act, 1888, (Note: Railway and Canal Traffic Act 1888 (51 & 52 Vict. c. 25)) containing the Classification of Merchandise Traffic, and the Schedule of Maximum Rates and Charges applicable thereto, of the Abbotsbury Railway Company, and certain other Railway Companies. (Note: Abbotsbury Railway; Abingdon Railway; Bala and Festiniog Railway; Banbury and Cheltenham Direct Railway; Bridport Railway; Buckfastleigh, Totnes and South Devon Railway; Calne Railway; Cornwall Minerals Railway; Corwen and Bala Railway; Devon and Somerset Railway; Didcot, Newbury, and Southampton Railway; Ely Valley Railway; Great Marlow Railway; Helston Railway; Kington and Eardisley Railway; Leominster and Kington Railway; Llangollen and Corwen Railway; Marlborough Railway; Milford Railway; Minehead Railway; Much Wenlock and Severn Junction Railway; Nantwich and Market Drayton Railway; Newent Railway; Oldbury Railway; Princetown Railway; Ross and Ledbury Railway; Ross and Monmouth Railway; Staines and West Drayton Railway; Teign Valley Railway; Tiverton and North Devon Railway; Vale of Llangollen Railway; Wellington and Severn Junction Railway; Wenlock Railway; West Somerset Railway; Woodstock Railway; Wye Valley Railway; Ludlow and Clee Hill Railway; Vale of Towy Railway; Shrewsbury and Hereford Railway; Shrewsbury and Wellington Railway; Shrewsbury and Welshpool Railway; Tenbury Railway; Clifton Extension Railway) (Repealed by Statute Law (Repeals) Act 2013 (c. 2))
	Railway Rates and Charges, No. 1 (Abbotsbury Railway, &c.) Order 1892 Order of the Board of Trade under the Railway and Canal Traffic Act, 1888, embodying the Classification of Merchandise Traffic and the Schedule of Maximum Rates and Charges, including all Terminal Charges applicable to the said Classification of — (1.) The Railways belonging to the following Railway Companies whose lines are leased or worked by the Great Western Railway Company, viz., the Abbotsbury Railway Company; Abingdon Railway Company; Bala and Festiniog Railway Company; Banbury and Cheltenham Direct Railway Company; Bridport Railway Company; Buckfastleigh, Totnes, and South Devon Railway Company; Calne Railway Company; Cornwall Minerals Railway Company; Corwen and Bala Railway Company; Devon and Somerset Railway Company; Didcot, Newbury, and Southampton Railway Company; Ely Valley Railway Company; Great Marlow Railway Company; Helston Railway Company; Kington and Eardisley Railway Company; Leominster and Kington Railway Company; Llangollen and Corwen Railway Company; Marlborough Railway Company; Milford Railway Company; Minehead Railway Company; Much Wenlock and Severn Junction Railway Company; Nantwich and Market Drayton Railway Company; Newent Railway Company; Oldbury Railway Company; Princetown Railway Company; Ross and Ledbury Railway Company; Ross and Monmouth Railway Company; Staines and West Drayton Railway Company; Teign Valley Railway Company; Tiverton and North Devon Railway Company; Vale of Llangollen Railway Company; Wellington and Severn Junction Railway Company; Wenlock Railway Company; West Somerset Railway Company; Woodstock Railway Company; Wye Valley Railway Company. (2.) The Railways belonging to the following Railway Companies whose lines are leased or worked by the London and North-Western and Great Western Railway Companies, viz., the Ludlow and Clee Hill Railway Company; Vale of Towy Railway Company. (3.) The following Railways which are owned, leased, or worked by the London and North-Western and Great Western Railway Companies, viz., the Shrewsbury and Hereford Railway; Shrewsbury and Wellington Railway; Shrewsbury and Welshpool Railway; Tenbury Railway. (4.) The following Railway which are owned, leased, or worked by the Midland Railway Company and the Great Western Railway Company, viz., the Clifton Extension Railway.	
Railway Rates and Charges, No. 2 (Brecon and Merthyr Tydfil Junction Railway, &c.), Order Confirmation Act 1892 (repealed)	55 & 56 Vict. c. xl	20 June 1892
An Act to confirm a Provisional Order made by the Board of Trade under the Railway and Canal Traffic Act, 1888, containing the Classification of Merchandise Traffic, and the Schedule of Maximum Rates and Charges applicable thereto, of the Brecon and Merthyr Tydfil Junction Railway Company, and certain other Railway Companies. (Note: Llanelly and Mynydd Mawr Railway; Pontypridd, Caerphilly and Newport Railway; Ravenglass and Eskdale Railway; West Lancashire Railway; and Wrexham, Mold and Connah's Quay Railway.) (Repealed by Statute Law (Repeals) Act 2013 (c. 2))
	Railway Rates and Charges, No. 2 (Brecon and Merthyr Tydfil Junction Railway, &c.) Order 1892 Order of the Board of Trade under the Railway and Canal Traffic Act, 1888, embodying the Classification of Merchandise Traffic and the Schedule of Maximum Rates and Charges, including all Terminal Charges applicable to the said Classification of the Brecon and Merthyr Tydfil Junction Railway Company, the Llanelly and Mynydd Mawr Railway Company, the Pontypridd, Caerphilly, and Newport Railway Company, the Ravenglass and Eskdale Railway Company, the West Lancashire Railway Company, and the Wrexham, Mold, and Connah's Quay Railway Company.	
Railway Rates and Charges, No. 3 (Cambrian Railway, &c.), Order Confirmation Act 1892 (repealed)	55 & 56 Vict. c. xli	20 June 1892
An Act to confirm a Provisional Order made by the Board of Trade under the Railway and Canal Traffic Act, 1888, containing the Classification of Merchandise Traffic, and the Schedule of Maximum Rates and Charges applicable thereto, of the Cambrian Railway Company, and certain other Railway Companies. (Note: Bishop's Castle Railway; Buckley Railway; Exmouth Docks and Railway; Mawddwy Railway; Mid-Wales Railway; South Wales Mineral Railway; Van Railway; and West Somerset Mineral Railway.) (Repealed by Statute Law (Repeals) Act 2013 (c. 2))
	Railway Rates and Charges, No. 3 (Cambrian Railway, &c.) Order 1892 Order of the Board of Trade under the Railway and Canal Traffic Act, 1888, embodying the Classification of Merchandise Traffic and the Schedule of Maximum Rates and Charges, including all Terminal Charges applicable to the said Classification of the Cambrian Railway Company; Bishop's Castle Railway Company; Buckley Railway Company; Exmouth Docks and Railway Company; Mawddwy Railway Company; Mid-Wales Railway Company; South Wales Mineral Railway Company; Van Railway Company; and West Somerset Mineral Railway Company.	
Railway Rates and Charges, No. 4 (Cleator and Workington Junction Railway, &c.), Order Confirmation Act 1892 (repealed)	55 & 56 Vict. c. xlii	20 June 1892
An Act to confirm a Provisional Order made by the Board of Trade under the Railway and Canal Traffic Act, 1888, containing the Classification of Merchandise Traffic, and the Schedule of Maximum Rates and Charges applicable thereto, of the Cleator and Workington Junction Railway Company, and certain other Railway Companies. (Note: Cleator and Workington Junction Railway; Cockermouth, Keswick and Penrith Railway; Corris Railway; Maryport and Carlisle Railway; Pembroke and Tenby Railway; Rowrah and Kelton Fell Railway; Severn and Wye and Severn Bridge Railway; and Southwold Railway.) (Repealed by Statute Law (Repeals) Act 2013 (c. 2))
	Railway Rates and Charges, No. 4 (Cleator and Workington Junction Railway, &c.) Order 1892 Order of the Board of Trade under the Railway and Canal Traffic Act, 1888, embodying the Classification of Merchandise Traffic and the Schedule of Maximum Rates and Charges, including all Terminal Charges applicable to the said Classification of the Cleator and Workington Junction Railway Company; Cockermouth, Keswick, and Penrith Railway Company; Corris Railway Company; Maryport and Carlisle Railway Company; Pembroke and Tenby Railway Company; Rowrah and Kelton Fell Railway Company; Severn and Wye and Severn Bridge Railway Company; and Southwold Railway Company.	
Railway Rates and Charges, No. 5 (East London Railway, &c.), Order Confirmation Act 1892 (repealed)	55 & 56 Vict. c. xliii	20 June 1892
An Act to confirm a Provisional Order made by the Board of Trade under the Railway and Canal Traffic Act, 1888, containing the Classification of Merchandise Traffic, and the Schedule of Maximum Rates and Charges applicable thereto, of the East London Railway Company, and certain other Railway Companies. (Note: Hounslow and Metropolitan Railway; Metropolitan District Railway; North and South Western Junction Railway; West London Railway; West London Extension Railway and City Lines and Extensions Railway.) (Repealed by Statute Law (Repeals) Act 2013 (c. 2))
	Railway Rates and Charges, No. 5 (East London Railway, &c.) Order 1892 Order of the Board of Trade under the Railway and Canal Traffic Act, 1888, embodying the Classification of Merchandise Traffic and the Schedule of Maximum Rates and Charges, including all Terminal Charges applicable to the said Classification of the East London Railway Company, the Hounslow and Metropolitan Railway Company, the Metropolitan District Railway Company, the North and South Western Junction Railway Company, the West London Railway Company, the West London Extension Railway Company, and certain other Railway Companies connected therewith.	
Railway Rates and Charges, No. 6 (Festiniog Railway, &c.), Order Confirmation Act 1892 (repealed)	55 & 56 Vict. c. xliv	20 June 1892
An Act to confirm a Provisional Order made by the Board of Trade under the Railway and Canal Traffic Act, 1888, containing the Classification of Merchandise Traffic, and the Schedule of Maximum Rates and Charges applicable thereto, of the Festiniog Railway Company, and certain other Railway Companies. (Note: Gorseddau Junction and Portmadoc Railway; North Wales Narrow Gauge Railway; and Croesor Tramway.) (Repealed by Statute Law (Repeals) Act 2013 (c. 2))
	Railway Rates and Charges, No. 6 (Festiniog Railway, &c.) Order 1892 Order of the Board of Trade under the Railway and Canal Traffic Act, 1888, embodying the Classification of Merchandise Traffic and the Schedule of Maximum Rates and Charges, including all Terminal Charges applicable to the said Classification of the Festiniog Railway Company, the Gorsedda Junction and Portmadoc Railway Company, the North Wales Narrow Gauge Railway Company, and the Portmadoc, Croesor, and Beddgelert Tram Railway Company.	
Railway Rates and Charges, No. 7 (Furness Railway, &c.), Order Confirmation Act 1892 (repealed)	55 & 56 Vict. c. xlv	20 June 1892
An Act to confirm a Provisional Order made by the Board of Trade under the Railway and Canal Traffic Act, 1888, containing the Classification of Merchandise Traffic, and the Schedule of Maximum Rates and Charges applicable thereto, of the Furness Railway Company and the London and North Western and Furness Railway Companies' Joint Railways. (Repealed by Statute Law (Repeals) Act 2013 (c. 2))
	Railway Rates and Charges, No. 7 (Furness Railway, &c.) Order 1892 Order of the Board of Trade under the Railway and Canal Traffic Act, 1888, embodying the Classification of Merchandise Traffic and the Schedule of Maximum Rates and Charges, including all Terminal Charges applicable to the said Classification of the Furness Railway Company and the London and North Western and Furness Railway Companies' Joint Railways.	
Railway Rates and Charges, No. 8 (Hull, Barnsley and West Riding Junction Railway), Order Confirmation Act 1892 (repealed)	55 & 56 Vict. c. xlvi	20 June 1892
An Act to confirm a Provisional Order made by the Board of Trade under the Railway and Canal Traffic Act, 1888, containing the Classification of Merchandise Traffic, and the Schedule of Maximum Rates and Charges applicable thereto, of the Hull, Barnsley, and West Riding Junction Railway Company. (Repealed by Statute Law (Repeals) Act 2013 (c. 2))
	Railway Rates and Charges, No. 8 (Hull, Barnsley and West Riding Junction Railway) Order 1892 Order of the Board of Trade under the Railway and Canal Traffic Act, 1888, embodying the classification of merchandise traffic and the schedule of maximum rates and charges, including all terminal charges applicable to the said classification of the Hull, Barnsley, and West Riding Junction Railway Company.	
Railway Rates and Charges, No. 9 (Isle of Wight Railway, &c.), Order Confirmation Act 1892 (repealed)	55 & 56 Vict. c. xlvii	20 June 1892
An Act to confirm a Provisional Order made by the Board of Trade under the Railway and Canal Traffic Act, 1888, containing the Classification of Merchandise Traffic, and the Schedule of Maximum Rates and Charges applicable thereto, of the Isle of Wight Railway Company, and certain other Railway Companies. (Note: Isle of Wight Central Railway; Brading Harbour Improvement Railway; and Freshwater, Yarmouth and Newport Railway.) (Repealed by Statute Law (Repeals) Act 2013 (c. 2))
	Railway Rates and Charges, No. 9 (Isle of Wight Railway, &c.) Order 1892 Order of the Board of Trade under the Railway and Canal Traffic Act, 1888, embodying the classification of merchandise traffic and the schedule of maximum rates and charges, including all terminal charges applicable to the said classification of the Isle of Wight Railway Company; Isle of Wight Central Railway Company; Brading Harbour Improvement Railway and Works Company; and Freshwater, Yarmouth, and Newport Railway Company.	
Railway Rates and Charges, No. 10 (Lancashire and Yorkshire Railway, &c.), Order Confirmation Act 1892 (repealed)	55 & 56 Vict. c. xlviii	20 June 1892
An Act to confirm a Provisional Order made by the Board of Trade under the Railway and Canal Traffic Act, 1888, containing the Classification of Merchandise Traffic, and the Schedule of Maximum Rates and Charges applicable thereto, of the Lancashire and Yorkshire Railway Company, and certain other Railway Companies. (Note: Lancashire Union Railway; North Union Railway; Preston and Longridge Railway; Preston and Wyre Railway; and Ribble Branch Joint Railway.) (Repealed by Statute Law (Repeals) Act 2013 (c. 2))
	Railway Rates and Charges, No. 10 (Lancashire and Yorkshire Railway, &c.) Order 1892 Order of the Board of Trade under the Railway and Canal Traffic Act, 1888, embodying the classification of merchandise traffic and the schedule of maximum rates and charges, including all terminal charges applicable to the said classification of the Lancashire and Yorkshire Railway Company, and certain other Railway Companies connected therewith.	
Railway Rates and Charges, No. 11 (London, Tilbury and Southend Railway, &c.), Order Confirmation Act 1892 (repealed)	55 & 56 Vict. c. xlix	20 June 1892
An Act to confirm a Provisional Order made by the Board of Trade under the Railway and Canal Traffic Act, 1888, containing the Classification of Merchandise Traffic, and the Schedule of Maximum Rates and Charges applicable thereto, of the London, Tilbury, and Southend Railway Company, and certain other Railway Companies. (Note: Burry Port and Gwendraeth Valley Railway; Colne Valley and Halstead Railway; East and West Junction Railway; Eastern and Midlands Railway; Evesham, Redditch and Stratford-upon-Avon Junction Railway; Felixstow Railway and Dock; Gwendreath Valleys Railway; King's Lynn Docks and Railway; Mellis and Eye Railway; Northampton and Banbury Junction Railway; Ramsey and Somersham Junction Railway; Tottenham and Hampstead Junction Railway; and Wivenhoe and Brightlingsea Railway.) (Repealed by Statute Law (Repeals) Act 2013 (c. 2))
	Railway Rates and Charges, No. 11 (London, Tilbury and Southend Railway, &c.) Order 1892 Order of the Board of Trade under the Railway and Canal Traffic Act, 1888, embodying the Classification of Merchandise Traffic and the Schedule of Maximum Rates and Charges, including all Terminal Charges applicable to the said Classification of the London Tilbury and Southend Railway Company, Burry Port and Gwendreath Valley Railway Company, Colne Valley and Halstead Railway Company, East and West Junction Railway Company, Eastern and Midlands Railway Company, Evesham Redditch and Stratford-on-Avon Railway Company, Felixstow Railway and Dock Company, Gwendraeth Valley Railway Company, King's Lynn Docks and Railway Company, Mellis and Eye Railway Company, Northampton and Banbury Junction Railway Company, Ramsey and Somersham Junction Railway Company, Tottenham and Hampstead Junction Railway Company, and the Wivenhoe and Brightlingsea Railway Company.	
Railway Rates and Charges, No. 12 (Manchester, Sheffield and Lincolnshire Railway, &c.), Order Confirmation Act 1892 (repealed)	55 & 56 Vict. c. l	20 June 1892
An Act to confirm a Provisional Order made by the Board of Trade under the Railway and Canal Traffic Act, 1888, containing the Classification of Merchandise Traffic, and the Schedule of Maximum Rates and Charges applicable thereto, of the Manchester, Sheffield, and Lincolnshire Railway Company, and certain other Railway Companies. (Note: Wigan Junction Railways; Cheshire Lines Committee; Southport and Cheshire Lines Extension Railway; Manchester South Junction and Altrincham Railway; Oldham, Ashton and Guide Bridge Junction Railway; Sheffield and Midland Railway Companies' Committee; and West Riding and Grimsby Railway.) (Repealed by Statute Law (Repeals) Act 2013 (c. 2))
	Railway Rates and Charges, No. 12 (Manchester, Sheffield and Lincolnshire Railway, &c.) Order 1892 Order of the Board of Trade under the Railway and Canal Traffic Act, 1888, embodying the Classification of Merchandise Traffic and the Schedule of Maximum Rates and Charges, including all Terminal Charges applicable to the said Classification of the Manchester, Sheffield and Lincolnshire Railway Company, the Liverpool, Southport, and Preston Junction Railway, and the Macclesfield Committee, and certain other Railway Companies connected therewith.	
Railway Rates and Charges, No. 13 (Metropolitan Railway, &c.), Order Confirmation Act 1892 (repealed)	55 & 56 Vict. c. li	20 June 1892
An Act to confirm a Provisional Order made by the Board of Trade under the Railway and Canal Traffic Act, 1888, containing the Classification of Merchandise Traffic, and the Schedule of Maximum Rates and Charges applicable thereto, of the Metropolitan Railway Company, and certain other Railway Companies. (Note: Hammersmith and City Joint Railway; and City Lines and Extensions Railway.) (Repealed by Statute Law (Repeals) Act 2013 (c. 2))
	Railway Rates and Charges, No. 13 (Metropolitan Railway, &c.) Order 1892 Order of the Board of Trade under the Railway and Canal Traffic Act, 1888, embodying the Classification of Merchandise Traffic and the Schedule of Maximum Rates and Charges, including all Terminal Charges applicable to the said Classification of the Metropolitan Railway Company, and certain other Railway Companies connected therewith.	
Railway Rates and Charges, No. 14 (Midland and South Western Junction Railway, &c.), Order Confirmation Act 1892 (repealed)	55 & 56 Vict. c. lii	20 June 1892
An Act to confirm a Provisional Order made by the Board of Trade under the Railway and Canal Traffic Act, 1888, containing the Classification of Merchandise Traffic, and the Schedule of Maximum Rates and Charges applicable thereto, of the Midland and South Western Junction Railway Company, and certain other Railway Companies. (Note: Golden Valley Railway; Liskeard and Caradon Railway; Liskeard and Looe Railway; Manchester and Milford Railway; Neath and Brecon Railway; Redruth and Chasewater Railway; Snailbeach District Railways; Talyllyn Railway; and Wirral Railway.) (Repealed by Statute Law (Repeals) Act 2013 (c. 2))
	Railway Rates and Charges, No. 14 (Midland and South Western Junction Railway, &c.) Order 1892 Order of the Board of Trade under the Railway and Canal Traffic Act, 1888, embodying the classification of merchandise traffic and the schedule of maximum rates and charges, including all terminal charges applicable to the said Classification of the Midland and South Western Junction Railway Company, Golden Valley Railway Company, Liskeard and Caradon Railway Company, Liskeard and Looe Union Canal Company, Manchester and Milford Railway Company, Neath and Brecon Railway Company, Redruth and Chasewater Railway Company, Snailbeach District Railway Company, Talyllyn Railway Company, and Wirral Railway Company.	
Railway Rates and Charges, No. 15 (North Eastern Railway, &c.), Order Confirmation Act 1892 (repealed)	55 & 56 Vict. c. liii	20 June 1892
An Act to confirm a Provisional Order made by the Board of Trade under the Railway and Canal Traffic Act, 1888, containing the Classification of Merchandise Traffic, and the Schedule of Maximum Rates and Charges applicable thereto, of the North Eastern Railway Company, and certain other Railway Companies. (Note: Forcett Railway; Great North of England, Clarence, and Hartlepool Junction Railway; Scarborough, Bridlington, and West Riding Junction Railways; Scarborough and Whitby Railway; and Londonderry (Seaham to Sunderland) Railway.) (Repealed by Statute Law (Repeals) Act 2013 (c. 2))
	Railway Rates and Charges, No. 15 (North Eastern Railway, &c.) Order 1892 Order of the Board of Trade under the Railway and Canal Traffic Act, 1888, embodying the classification of merchandise traffic and the schedule of maximum rates and charges, including all terminal charges applicable to the said Classification of the Forcett Railway Company, the Great North of England, Clarence, and Hartlepool Junction Railway Company, the Scarborough, Bridlington, and West Riding Junction Railways Company, the Scarborough and Whitby Railway Company, and the Marquis of Londonderry in respect of the Londonderry (Seaham to Sunderland) Railway.	
Railway Rates and Charges, No. 16 (North London Railway), Order Confirmation Act 1892 (repealed)	55 & 56 Vict. c. liv	20 June 1892
An Act to confirm a Provisional Order made by the Board of Trade under the Railway and Canal Traffic Act, 1888, containing the Classification of Merchandise Traffic, and the Schedule of Maximum Rates and Charges applicable thereto, of the North London Railway Company. (Repealed by Statute Law (Repeals) Act 2013 (c. 2))
	Railway Rates and Charges, No. 16 (North London) Order 1892 Order of the Board of Trade under the Railway and Canal Traffic Act, 1888, embodying the classification of merchandise traffic and the schedule of maximum rates and charges, including all terminal charges applicable to the said classification of the North London Railway Company.	
Railway Rates and Charges, No. 17 (North Staffordshire Railway, &c.), Order Confirmation Act 1892 (repealed)	55 & 56 Vict. c. lv	20 June 1892
An Act to confirm a Provisional Order made by the Board of Trade under the Railway and Canal Traffic Act, 1888, containing the Classification of Merchandise Traffic, and the Schedule of Maximum Rates and Charges applicable thereto, of the North Staffordshire Railway Company, and certain other Railway Companies. (Note: Longton, Adderley Green and Bucknall Railway; Cheadle Railway; Silverdale and Newcastle Railway; and Mr. Sneyd's Railway.) (Repealed by Statute Law (Repeals) Act 2013 (c. 2))
	Railway Rates and Charges, No. 17 (North Staffordshire Railway, &c.) Order 1892 Order of the Board of Trade under the Railway and Canal Traffic Act, 1888, embodying the classification of merchandise traffic and the schedule of maximum rates and charges, including all terminal charges applicable to the said classification of the North Staffordshire Railway Company, and certain other railway companies connected therewith.	
Railway Rates and Charges, No. 18 (Taff Vale Railway, &c.), Order Confirmation Act 1892 (repealed)	55 & 56 Vict. c. lvi	20 June 1892
An Act to confirm a Provisional Order made by the Board of Trade under the Railway and Canal Traffic Act, 1888, containing the Classification of Merchandise Traffic, and the Schedule of Maximum Rates and Charges applicable thereto, of the Taff Vale Railway Company, and certain other Railway Companies. (Note: Aberdare Railway; Alexandra (Newport and South Wales) Docks and Railway; Barry Railway; Great Western Railway and the Rhymney Railway Joint Railways; Great Western Railway and Taff Vale Railway Joint Railway; Mersey Railway; Penarth Extension Railway; Penarth Harbour, Dock, and Railway; Rhondda and Swansea Bay Railway; and Rhymney Railway.) (Repealed by Statute Law (Repeals) Act 2013 (c. 2))
	Railway Rates and Charges, No. 18 (Taff Vale Railway, &c.) Order 1892 Order of the Board of Trade under the Railway and Canal Traffic Act, 1888, embodying the Classification of Merchandise Traffic and the Schedule of Maximum Rates and Charges, including all Terminal Charges applicable to the said Classification of the Taff Vale Railway Company, the Aberdare Railway Company, the Alexandra (Newport and South Wales) Docks and Railway Company, the Barry Railway Company, the Great Western Railway Company and the Rhymney Railway Company Joint Railways, the Great Western Railway Company and Taff Vale Railway Company Joint Railway, the Mersey Railway Company, the Penarth Extension Railway Company, the Penarth Harbour, Dock, and Railway Company, the Rhondda and Swansea Bay Railway Company, and the Rhymney Railway Company.	
Railway Rates and Charges, No. 19 (Caledonian Railway, &c.), Order Confirmation Act 1892 (repealed)	55 & 56 Vict. c. lvii	20 June 1892
An Act to confirm a Provisional Order made by the Board of Trade under the Railway and Canal Traffic Act, 1888, containing the Classification of Merchandise Traffic, and the Schedule of Maximum Rates and Charges applicable thereto, of the Caledonian Railway Company, and certain other Railway Companies. (Note: Arbroath and Forfar Railway; Cathcart District Railway; Dundee and Newtyle Railway; Greenock and Wemyss Bay Railway; Killin Railway; Lanarkshire and Ayrshire Railway; Solway Junction Railway; Portpatrick and Wigtownshire Joint Railways; Carlisle Station Lines; Glasgow and Paisley Joint Railway; Glasgow, Barrhead and Kilmarnock Joint Railway; and Dundee and Arbroath Joint Railway.) (Repealed by Statute Law (Repeals) Act 2013 (c. 2))
	Railway Rates and Charges, No. 19 (Caledonian Railway, &c.) Order 1892 Order of the Board of Trade under the Railway and Canal Traffic Act, 1888, embodying the Classification of Merchandise Traffic and the Schedule of Maximum Rates and Charges, including all Terminal Charges applicable to the said Classification of the Caledonian Railway Company, and certain other Railway Companies connected therewith.	
Railway Rates and Charges, No. 20 (Callander and Oban Railway), Order Confirmation Act 1892 (repealed)	55 & 56 Vict. c. lviii	20 June 1892
An Act to confirm a Provisional Order made by the Board of Trade under the Railway and Canal Traffic Act, 1888, containing the Classification of Merchandise Traffic, and the Schedule of Maximum Rates and Charges applicable thereto, of the Callander and Oban Railway Company. (Repealed by Statute Law (Repeals) Act 2013 (c. 2))
	Railway Rates and Charges, No. 20 (Callander and Oban Railway) Order 1892 Order of the Board of Trade under the Railway and Canal Traffic Act, 1888, embodying the Classification of Merchandise Traffic and the Schedule of Maximum Rates and Charges, including all Terminal Charges applicable to the said Classification of the Callander and Oban Railway Company.	
Railway Rates and Charges, No. 21 (City of Glasgow Union Railway), Order Confirmation Act 1892 (repealed)	55 & 56 Vict. c. lix	20 June 1892
An Act to confirm a Provisional Order made by the Board of Trade under the Railway and Canal Traffic Act, 1888, containing the Classification of Merchandise Traffic, and the Schedule of Maximum Bates and Charges applicable thereto, of the City of Glasgow Union Railway Company. (Repealed by Statute Law (Repeals) Act 2013 (c. 2))
	Railway Rates and Charges, No. 21 (City of Glasgow Union Railway) Order 1892 Order of the Board of Trade under the Railway and Canal Traffic Act, 1888, embodying the Classification of Merchandise Traffic and the Schedule of Maximum Rates and Charges, including all Terminal Charges applicable to the said Classification of the City of Glasgow Union Railway Company.	
Railway Rates and Charges, No. 22 (Glasgow and South Western Railway, &c.), Order Confirmation Act 1892 (repealed)	55 & 56 Vict. c. lx	20 June 1892
An Act to confirm a Provisional Order made by the Board of Trade under the Railway and Canal Traffic Act, 1888, containing the Classification of Merchandise Traffic, and the Schedule of Maximum Rates and Charges applicable thereto, of the Glasgow and South Western Railway Company, and certain other Railway Companies. (Note: Ayrshire and Wigtownshire Railway; and Kilmarnock and Troon Railway.) (Repealed by Statute Law (Repeals) Act 2013 (c. 2))
	Railway Rates and Charges, No. 22 (Glasgow and South Western Railway, &c.) Order 1892 Order of the Board of Trade under the Railway and Canal Traffic Act, 1888, embodying the Classification of Merchandise Traffic and the Schedule of Maximum Rates and Charges, including all Terminal Charges applicable to the said Classification of the Glasgow and South Western Railway Company, and certain other Railway Companies connected therewith.	
Railway Rates and Charges, No. 23 (Great North of Scotland Railway), Order Confirmation Act 1892 (repealed)	55 & 56 Vict. c. lxi	20 June 1892
An Act to confirm a Provisional Order made by the Board of Trade under the Railway and Canal Traffic Act, 1888, containing the Classification of Merchandise Traffic, and the Schedule of Maximum Rates and Charges applicable thereto, of the Great North of Scotland Railway Company. (Repealed by Statute Law (Repeals) Act 2013 (c. 2))
	Railway Rates and Charges, No. 23 (Great North of Scotland Railway) Order 1892 Order of the Board of Trade under the Railway and Canal Traffic Act, 1888, embodying the Classification of Merchandise Traffic and the Schedule of Maximum Rates and Charges, including all Terminal Charges applicable to the said Classification of the Great North of Scotland Railway Company.	
Railway Rates and Charges, No. 24 (Highland Railway), Order Confirmation Act 1892 (repealed)	55 & 56 Vict. c. lxii	20 June 1892
An Act to confirm a Provisional Order made by the Board of Trade under the Railway and Canal Traffic Act, 1888, containing the Classification of Merchandise Traffic, and the Schedule of Maximum Rates and Charges applicable thereto, of the Highland Railway Company. (Repealed by Statute Law (Repeals) Act 2013 (c. 2))
	Railway Rates and Charges, No. 24 (Highland Railway) Order 1892 Order of the Board of Trade under the Railway and Canal Traffic Act, 1888, embodying the Classification of Merchandise Traffic and the Schedule of Maximum Rates and Charges, including all Terminal Charges applicable to the said Classification of the Highland Railway Company.	
Railway Rates and Charges, No. 25 (North British Railway, &c.), Order Confirmation Act 1892 (repealed)	55 & 56 Vict. c. lxiii	20 June 1892
An Act to confirm a Provisional Order made by the Board of Trade under the Railway and Canal Traffic Act, 1888, containing the Classification of Merchandise Traffic, and the Schedule of Maximum Rates and Charges applicable thereto, of the North British Railway Company, and certain other Railway Companies. (Note: Anstruther and St Andrews Railway; Edinburgh and Bathgate Railway, Eyemouth Railway; Forth and Clyde Junction Railway; Forth Bridge Railway; Glasgow, Yoker and Clydebank Railway; Kilsyth and Bonnybridge Railway; and Newport Railway.) (Repealed by Statute Law (Repeals) Act 2013 (c. 2))
	Railway Rates and Charges, No. 25 (North British Railway, &c.) Order 1892 Order of the Board of Trade under the Railway and Canal Traffic Act, 1888, embodying the Classification of Merchandise Traffic and the Schedule of Maximum Rates and Charges, including all Terminal Charges applicable to the said Classification of the North British Railway Company, and certain other Railway Companies connected therewith.	
Railway Rates and Charges, No. 26 (Athenry and Ennis Junction Railway, &c.), Order Confirmation Act 1892 (repealed)	55 & 56 Vict. c. lxiv	20 June 1892
An Act to confirm a Provisional Order made by the Board of Trade under the Railway and Canal Traffic Act, 1888, containing the Classification of Merchandise Traffic, and the Schedule of Maximum Rates and Charges applicable thereto, of the Athenry and Ennis Junction Railway Company, and certain other Railway Companies. (Note: Atherny and Tuam Railway; Ballinascarthy and Timoleague Junction Light Railway; Ballinrobe and Claremorris Railway; Ballycastle Railway; Baltimore Extension Railway; Belfast and County Down Railway; Belfast and Northern Counties Railway; Bessbrook and Newry Tramway; Castlederg and Victoria Bridge Tramway; Cavan and Leitrim Railway; Clara and Banagher Railway; Claremorris and Collooney Railway; Clonakilty Extension Railway; Clogher Valley Railway; Cork and Macroom Direct Railway; Cork and Muskerry Light Railway; Cork, Bandon and South Coast Railway; Cork, Blackrock and Passage Railway; Derry Central Railway; Downpatrick, Killough and Ardglass Railway; Draperstown Railway; Dublin and Kingstown Railway; Dublin and Lucan Steam Tramway; Dublin, Wicklow and Wexford Railway; Dundalk, Newry and Greenore Railway; Great Northern Railway (Ireland); Great Southern and Western Railway; Ilen Valley Railway; Kanturk and Newmarket Railway; Kilkenny Junction Railway; Letterkenny Railway; Limavady and Dungiven Railway; Limerick and Kerry Railway; Listowel and Ballybunion Railway; London and North Western Railway; Londonderry and Lough Swilly Railway; Loughrea and Attymon Light Railway; Midland Great Western Railway; Rathkeale and Newcastle Junction Railway; Sligo, Leitrim and Northern Counties Railway; Southern of Ireland Railway; Timoleague and Courtmacsherry Extension Light Railway; Tralee and Dingle Light Railway; Tralee and Fenit Railway; Tuam and Claremorris Railway; Waterford and Central Ireland Railway; Waterford and Limerick Railway; Waterford and Tramore Railway; Waterford and Wexford Railway; Waterford, Dungarvan and Lismore Railway; Schull and Skibbereen Railway; West Clare Railway; West Donegal Railway; Cork, Bandon and South Coast Railway; Headford and Kenmare Railway, West Kerry (Killorglin and Valentia) Railway; Ballina to Killala Railway; Galway to Clifden Railway; and Westport to Mallarany Railway.) (Repealed by Statute Law (Repeals) Act 2013 (c. 2))
	Railway Rates and Charges, No. 26 (Athenry and Ennis Junction Railway, &c.) Order 1892 Order of the Board of Trade under the Railway and Canal Traffic Act, 1888, embodying the Classification of Merchandise Traffic and the Schedule of Maximum Rates and Charges, including all Terminal Charges applicable to the said Classification of the Athenry and Ennis Junction Railway Company; Atherny and Tuam Railway Company; Ballinascarthy and Timoleague Junction Light Railway Company; Ballinrobe and Claremorris Railway Company; Ballycastle Railway Company; Baltimore Extension Railway Company; Belfast and County Down Railway Company; Belfast and Northern Counties Railway Company; Bessbrook and Newry Tramway Company; Castlederg and Victoria Bridge Tramway Company; Cavan, Leitrim, and Roscommon Light Railway and Tramway Company; Clara and Banagher Railway Company; Claremorris and Collooney Railway Company; Clonakilty Extension Railway Company; Clogher Valley Tramway Company; Cork and Macroom Direct Railway Company; Cork and Muskerry Light Railway Company; Cork, Bandon, and South Coast Railway Company; Cork, Blackrock, and Passage Railway Company; Derry Central Railway Company; Downpatrick, Killough, and Ardglass Railway Company; Draperstown Railway Company; Dublin and Kingstown Railway Company; Dublin and Lucan Steam Tramway Company; Dublin, Wicklow, and Wexford Railway Company; Dundalk, Newry, and Greenore Railway Company; Great Northern Railway (Ireland) Company; Great Southern and Western Railway Company; Ilen Valley Railway Company; Kanturk and Newmarket Railway Company; Kilkenny Junction Railway Company; Letterkenny Railway Company; Limavady and Dungiven Railway Company; Limerick and Kerry Railway Company; Listowel and Ballybunion Railway Company; London and North-Western Railway Company (Irish Lines); Londonderry and Lough Swilly Railway Company; Loughrea and Attymon Light Railway Company; Midland Great Western Railway of Ireland Company; Rathkeale and Newcastle Junction Railway Company; Sligo, Leitrim, and Northern Counties Railway Company; Southern Railway Company; Timoleague and Courtmacsherry Extension Light Railway Company; Tralee and Dingle Light Railway or Tramway Company; Tralee and Fenit Railway Company; Tuam and Claremorris Railway Company; Waterford and Central Ireland Railway Company; Waterford and Limerick Railway Company; Waterford and Tramore Railway Company; Waterford and Wexford Railway Company; Wateford, Dungarvan, and Lismore Railway Company; West Carbery Tramways and Light Railways Company; West Clare Railway Company; West Donegal Railway Company; the Cork, Bandon, and South Coast Railway Company in respect of the extension to Bantry Bay; the Great Southern and Western Railway Company in respect of the Headford and Kenmare Railway, and the West Kerry (Killorglin and Valentia) Railway; and the Midland Great Western Railway of Ireland Company in respect of the Ballina to Killala Railway, the Galway to Clifden Railway, and the Westport to Mallarany Railway, and any extension railway to Achill.	
Milnathort Water Supply Confirmation Act 1892	55 & 56 Vict. c. lxv	20 June 1892
An Act to confirm a Provisional Order under the Public Health (Scotland) Act, 1867, (Note: Public Health (Scotland) Act 1867 (30 & 31 Vict. c. 101)) relating to Milnathort Water.
	Milnathort Water Order 1892 Milnathort Water Supply. Provisional Order.	
Gas Orders Confirmation (No. 1) Act 1892	55 & 56 Vict. c. lxvi	20 June 1892
An Act to confirm certain Provisional Orders made by the Board of Trade under the Gas and Water Works Facilities Act, 1870, (Note: Gas and Water Works Facilities Act 1870 (33 & 34 Vict. c. 70)) relating to Cullingworth Gas, Kempston Gas, Mitcham and Wimbledon District Gas, South Normanton and Blackwell Gas, and Sutton and Hooton District Gas.
	Cullingworth Gas Order 1892 Order empowering the Cullingworth Gas Company, Limited, to maintain and continue gasworks and to manufacture and supply gas in the township and parish of Bingley and the township of Wilsden, in the parish of Bradford, all in the West Riding of the county of York.	
	Kempston Gas Order 1892 Order empowering the Kempston Gas Company, Limited, to maintain and continue gasworks and to manufacture and supply gas in the several parishes of Kempston, Elstow, and Wooton, all in the county of Bedford.	
	Mitcham and Wimbledon District Gas Order 1892 Order empowering the Mitcham and Wimbledon District Gaslight Company to construct and maintain additional works.	
	South Normanton and Blackwell Gas Order 1892 Order empowering the South Normanton, Blackwell, and Hucnkness-under-Huthwaite Gas Company, Limited, to maintain and continue gasworks and to manufacture and supply gas within the parish of Blackwell and parts of the parishes of South Normanton and Tibshelf, all in the county of Derby.	
	Sutton and Hooton District Gas Order 1892 Order empowering the Sutton and Hooton Gas Company, Limited, to maintain and continue gasworks and to manufacture and supply gas in the townships of Willaston, Hooton, Childer, Thornton, Great Sutton, Little Sutton, Ledsham, and Capenhurst, all in the county of Chester.	
Pier and Harbour Orders Confirmation (No. 2) Act 1892	55 & 56 Vict. c. lxvii	20 June 1892
An Act to confirm certain Provisional Orders made by the Board of Trade under the General Pier and Harbour Act, 1861, relating to Canna, Fleetwood, Mevagissey, and Newlyn.
	Canna Pier Order 1892 Order for the Construction, Mointenance, and Regulation of a Pier at Rudha Carr-Innis, in Canna Harbour, in the Parish of Small Isles and County of Inverness.	
	Fleetwood Pier Order 1892 Order for the Construction, Maintenance, and Regulation of a Pier at Fleetwood in the County of Lancaster.	
	Mevagissey Harbour Order 1892 Order for amending the Mevagissey Harbour Orders, 1865 and 1886.	
	Newlyn Pier and Harbour Order 1892 Order for extending the time for construction of the Works authorised by the Newlyn Pier and Harbour Order, 1886, and for conferring additional powers on the Newlyn Pier and Harbour Commissioners.	
Local Government Board's Provisional Orders Confirmation Act 1892	55 & 56 Vict. c. lxviii	20 June 1892
An Act to confirm certain Provisional Orders of the Local Government Board relating to the Urban Sanitary Districts of Bethesda; Bolton, Buxton, Eye, Lowestoft, Nottingham, Oswaldtwistle, Reading, and Wigan.
	Bethesda Order 1892 Provisional Order for altering a Local Act (Note: Bethesda Improvement Act 1854 (17 & 18 Vict. c. cxi)) and a Confirming Act. (Note: Local Government Board's Provisional Orders Confirmation (No. 6) Act 1882 (45 & 46 Vict. c. lxiii))	
	Bolton Order 1892 Provisional Order for partially repealing and altering a Local Act (Note: Bolton Improvement Act 1882 (45 & 46 Vict. c. ccxliv)) and a Confirming Act. (Note: Local Government Board's Provisional Orders Confirmation (No. 5) Act 1890 (53 & 54 Vict. c. lxxxiv))	
	Buxton Order 1892 Provisional Order for altering a Local Act (Note: Buxton Local Board Act 1873 (36 & 37 Vict. c. lvi)) and a Confirming Act. (Note: Local Government Board's Provisional Orders Confirmation (No. 4) Act 1886 (49 & 50 Vict. c. lxi))	
	Eye Order 1892 Provisional Order for altering the mode of defraying the Expenses of an Urban Sanitary Authority.	
	Lowestoft Order 1892 Provisional Order for altering the Lowestoft Improvement Act, 1854. (Note: Lowestoft Improvement Act 1854 (17 & 18 Vict. c. clxi))	
	Nottingham Order 1892 Provisional Order for altering the Nottingham Corporation Act, 1882. (Note: Nottingham Corporation Act 1882 (45 & 46 Vict. c. ccxvii))	
	Oswaldtwistle Order 1892 Provisional Order for altering the Oswaldtwistle Local Board Act, 1869, (Note: Oswaldtwistle Local Board Act 1869 (32 & 33 Vict. c. lxvi)) and a Confirming Act. (Note: Local Government Board's Provisional Orders Confirmation (No. 2) Act 1888 (51 & 52 Vict. c. xl))	
	Reading Order 1892 Provisional Order for partially repealing and altering certain Local Acts. (Note: Reading Corporation Act 1881 (44 & 45 Vict. c. clxxi)) (Note: Reading Corporation Act 1887 (50 & 51 Vict. c. clxiii))	
	Wigan Order (1) 1892 Provisional Order for altering the Wigan Improvement Act, 1874. (Note: Wigan Improvement Act 1874 (37 & 38 Vict. c. cxxiv))	
Local Government Board's Provisional Orders Confirmation (No. 2) Act 1892	55 & 56 Vict. c. lxix	20 June 1892
An Act to confirm certain Provisional Orders of the Local Government Board relating to the Urban Sanitary Districts of Barnsley, Halifax, Keighley, and Wigan.
	Barnsley Order 1892 Provisional Order to enable the Urban Sanitary Authority for the Borough of Barnsley to put in force the Compulsory Clauses of the Lands Clauses Acts.	
	Halifax Order (1) 1892 Provisional Order to enable the Urban Sanitary Authority for the Borough of Halifax to put in force the Compulsory Clauses of the Lands Clauses Acts.	
	Keighley Order 1892 Provisional Order to enable the Urban Sanitary Authority for the Borough of Keighley to put in force the Compulsory Clauses of the Lands Clauses Acts.	
	Wigan Order (2) 1892 Provisional Order to enable the Urban Sanitary Authority for the Borough of Wigan to put in force the Compulsory Clauses of the Lands Clauses Acts.	
Local Government Board's Provisional Orders Confirmation (No. 3) Act 1892	55 & 56 Vict. c. lxx	20 June 1892
An Act to confirm certain Provisional Orders of the Local Government Board relating to the Urban Sanitary Districts of Acton, Bridgend, Lincoln, New Windsor, Rawdon, Sale, and Stapleton.
	Acton Order 1892 Provisional Order to enable the Sanitary Authority for the Urban Sanitary District of Acton to put in force the Compulsory Clauses of the Lands Clauses Acts.	
	Bridgend Order 1892 Provisional Order to enable the Sanitary Authority for the Urban Sanitary District of Bridgend to put in force the Compulsory Clauses of the Lands Clauses Acts.	
	Lincoln Order 1892 Provisional Order to enable the Urban Sanitary Authority for the City of Lincoln to put in force the Compulsory Clauses of the Lands Clauses Acts.	
	New Windsor Order 1892 Provisional Order to enable the Urban Sanitary Authority for the Borough of New Windsor to put in force the Compulsory Clauses of the Lands Clauses Acts.	
	Rawdon Order 1892 Provisional Order to enable the Sanitary Authority for the Urban Sanitary District of Rawdon to put in force the Compulsory Clauses of the Lands Clauses Acts.	
	Sale Order 1892 Provisional Order to enable the Sanitary Authority for the Urban Sanitary District of Sale to put in force the Compulsory Clauses of the Lands Clauses Acts.	
	Stapleton Order 1892 Provisional Order to enable the Sanitary Authority for the Urban Sanitary District of Stapleton to put in force the Compulsory Clauses of the Lands Clauses Acts.	
Local Government Board's Provisional Orders Confirmation (No. 4) Act 1892	55 & 56 Vict. c. lxxi	20 June 1892
An Act to confirm certain Provisional Orders of the Local Government Board relating to the Urban Sanitary Districts of Halifax, Milford, Northampton, Rochdale, Tenterden, and Wigan.
	Halifax Order (2) 1892 Provisional Order for partially repealing and altering certain Local Acts (Note: Halifax Improvement Act 1823 (4 Geo. 4. c. xc)) (Note: Halifax Improvement Act 1853 (16 & 17 Vict. c. clxvii)) (Note: Halifax Corporation Waterworks and Improvement Act 1868) (Note: Halifax Water and Gas Extension Act 1876 (39 & 40 Vict. c. ccxxxiv)) and a Confirming Act. (Note: Public Health Supplemental Act 1851 (No. 3) (14 & 15 Vict. c. 103))	
	Milford Order 1892 Provisional Order for altering the Milford Improvement Acts, 1857 (Note: Milford Improvement Act 1857 (20 & 21 Vict. c. lxxiv)) and 1869, (Note: Milford Improvement Act 1869 (32 & 33 Vict. c. xcvii)) and certain Confirming Acts. (Note: Local Government Board's Provisional Orders Confirmation (No. 7) Act 1884 (47 & 48 Vict. c. ccxiv)) (Note: Local Government Board's Provisional Orders Confirmation Act 1885 (48 & 49 Vict. c. i)) (Note: Local Government Board's Provisional Orders Confirmation (No. 7) Act 1887 (50 & 51 Vict. c. clxxx)) (Note: Local Government Board's Provisional Orders Confirmation (No. 3) Act 1888 (51 & 52 Vict. c. lxi)) (Note: Local Government Board's Provisional Orders Confirmation (No. 3) Act 1890 (53 & 54 Vict. c. lxxxii))	
	Northampton Order 1892 Provisional Order for partially repealing and altering certain Local Acts. (Note: Northampton Improvement Act 1843 (6 & 7 Vict. c. lxxviii)) (Note: Northampton Improvement Act 1871 (34 & 35 Vict. c. cxxxix))	
	Rochdale Order 1892 Provisional Order for altering the Rochdale Improvement Act, 1872. (Note: Rochdale Improvement Act 1872 (35 & 36 Vict. c. cxlix))	
	Tenterden Order 1892 Provisional Order for altering the mode of defraying the Expenses of an Urban Sanitary Authority.	
	Wigan Order (3) 1892 Provisional Order for altering certain Local Acts (Note: Wigan Waterworks Act 1853 (16 & 17 Vict. c. lxvii)) (Note: Wigan Waterworks Act 1860 (23 & 24 Vict. c. clxxxvi)) (Note: Wigan Improvement Act 1880 (43 & 44 Vict. c. cxxvii)) and Confirming Acts. (Note: Local Government Supplemental Act 1859 (No. 2) (22 & 23 Vict. c. 11)) (Note: Local Government Board's Provisional Orders Confirmation (No. 10) Act 1886 (50 Vict. c. xvi))	
Local Government Board's Provisional Orders Confirmation (No. 5) Act 1892	55 & 56 Vict. c. lxxii	20 June 1892
An Act to confirm certain Provisional Orders of the Local Government Board relating to the Urban Sanitary Districts of Dover, Merthyr Tydfil, Plymouth, and Torquay.
	Dover Order 1892 Provisional Order to enable the Urban Sanitary Authority for the Borough of Dover to put in force the Compulsory Clauses of the Lands Clauses Acts.	
	Merthyr Tydfil Order 1892 Provisional Order to enable the Sanitary Authority for the Urban Sanitary District of Merthyr Tydfil to put in force the Compulsory Clauses of the Lands Clauses Acts.	
	Plymouth Order 1892 Provisional Order to enable the Urban Sanitary Authority for the Borough of Plymouth to put in force the Compulsory Clauses of the Lands Clauses Acts.	
	Torquay Order 1892 Provisional Order to enable the Sanitary Authority for the Urban Sanitary District of Torquay to put in force the Compulsory Clauses of the Lands Clauses Acts.	
Bathgate Water Supply Confirmation Act 1892	55 & 56 Vict. c. lxxiii	20 June 1892
An Act to confirm a Provisional Order under the Public Health (Scotland) Act, 1867, Delating to Bathgate Water.
	Bathgate (Linlithgowshire) Water Supply Order 1892 County Council of Linlithgow (Bathgate District) Water Supply. Provisional Order.	
Allotments Provisional Order Confirmation Act 1892	55 & 56 Vict. c. lxxiv	20 June 1892
An Act to confirm a Provisional Order made by the County Council of Gloucester under the Allotments Act, 1887, (Note: Allotments Act 1887 (50 & 51 Vict. c. 48)) relating to the Parish of Abson-with-Wick, in the Rural Sanitary District of the Chipping Sodbury Union.
	Chipping Sodbury Union Order 1892 Chipping Sodbury Union. Provisional Order.	
Local Government Board (Ireland) Provisional Orders Confirmation (No. 6) Act 1892	55 & 56 Vict. c. lxxv	20 June 1892
An Act to confirm two Provisional Orders made by the Local Government Board for Ireland under the Public Health (Ireland) Act, 1878, relating to the towns of Dundalk and Bangor.
	Dundalk Burial Ground Provisional Order 1892 Dundalk Burial Ground. Provisional Order.	
	Bangor Waterworks Provisional Order 1892 Bangor Additional Waterworks. Provisional Order.	
Dublin Barracks Improvement Act 1892	55 & 56 Vict. c. lxxvi	20 June 1892
An Act to enable the Secretary of State for the War Department to purchase certain lands in or near Dublin for the Improvement of the Wellington (Note: Wellington Barracks, now Griffith Barracks.) and Beggars Bush (Note: Beggars Bush Barracks.) Barracks at Dublin respectively.
Corporation of London (Loans) Act 1892	55 & 56 Vict. c. lxxvii	20 June 1892
An Act to authorise the Corporation of London to borrow and reborrow under the Local Loans Act 1875. (Note: Local Loans Act 1875 (38 & 39 Vict. c. 83))
Lanarkshire and Ayrshire Railway Act 1892	55 & 56 Vict. c. lxxviii	20 June 1892
An Act to empower the Lanarkshire and Ayrshire Railway Company to raise further moneys to enable the Caledonian Railway Company to make additional advances to the Company by way of Loan or by Subscription for Shares or otherwise and for other purposes.
Eastbourne, Seaford and Newhaven Railway (Abandonment) Act 1892 (repealed)	55 & 56 Vict. c. lxxix	20 June 1892
An Act for the abandonment of the Eastbourne Seaford and Newhaven Railway. (Repealed by Statute Law (Repeals) Act 2013 (c. 2))
Mold Water Act 1892	55 & 56 Vict. c. lxxx	20 June 1892
An Act to confer further powers upon the Mold Gas and Water Company to empower them to raise additional Capital and for other purposes.
Southend Gas Act 1892	55 & 56 Vict. c. lxxxi	20 June 1892
An Act for conferring further powers on the Southend Gas Company for the construction of Works the raising of money and for other purposes.
Metropolitan Railway Act 1892	55 & 56 Vict. c. lxxxii	20 June 1892
An Act for conferring further powers upon the Metropolitan Railway Company in relation to their own and other Undertakings and for authorising Agreements with other Companies and Bodies and for other purposes.
Cleator Moor Local Board (Gas) Act 1892	55 & 56 Vict. c. lxxxiii	20 June 1892
An Act to authorise the transfer of the Undertaking of the Cleator Moor Gas Company Limited to the Cleator Moor Local Board and for other purposes.
Dundee Harbour (Amendment) Act 1892 (repealed)	55 & 56 Vict. c. lxxxiv	20 June 1892
An Act to amend the Acts relating to the Harbour of Dundee; and for other purposes. (Repealed by Dundee Harbour and Tay Ferries Consolidation Act 1911 (1 & 2 Geo. 5. c. lxxx))
Waterloo-with-Seaforth Local Board Act 1892	55 & 56 Vict. c. lxxxv	20 June 1892
An Act to confer further powers of control over the seashore of the local government district of Waterloo with Seaforth in the County of Lancaster to make better provision in regard to streets and buildings and for other purposes.
Rossendale Valley Tramways (Abandonment) Act 1892 (repealed)	55 & 56 Vict. c. lxxxvi	20 June 1892
An Act for the abandonment of part of the Rossendale Valley Tramways and for other purposes. (Repealed by County of Lancashire Act 1984 (c. xxi))
Medway (Upper) Navigation Act 1892	55 & 56 Vict. c. lxxxvii	20 June 1892
An Act to amend the Acts relating to the Company of Proprietors of the Navigation of the River Medway and to provide for the management and constitution of the Company and to change the name of the Company and for other purposes.
Tredegar Waterworks Act 1892	55 & 56 Vict. c. lxxxviii	20 June 1892
An Act to authorise the Local Board for the District of Tredegar to construct additional Waterworks and for other purposes.
Folkestone, Sandgate and Hythe Tramways Act 1892	55 & 56 Vict. c. lxxxix	20 June 1892
An Act to extend the periods now respectively limited for completing and opening certain tramways authorised to be constructed by the Folkestone Sandgate and Hythe Tramways Company and for other purposes.
Ormskirk Gaslight Act 1892 (repealed)	55 & 56 Vict. c. xc	20 June 1892
An Act to authorise the Ormskirk Gas Light Company to extend their limits of supply to raise additional Capital to acquire additional Lands and for other purposes. (Repealed by County of Lancashire Act 1984 (c. xxi))
Ribble Navigation Act 1892 (repealed)	55 & 56 Vict. c. xci	20 June 1892
An Act to enable the Mayor Aldermen and Burgesses of the Borough of Preston to borrow additional moneys for the purposes of the Kibble Navigation and Preston Dock Undertaking. (Repealed by Preston Borough Council Act 1981 (c. xxii))
Kilmarnock Corporation Water Act 1892	55 & 56 Vict. c. xcii	20 June 1892
An Act to enable the Provost Maigistrates and Town Council of the Burgh of Kilmarnock to acquire the Undertaking of the Kilmarnock Water Company to construct Waterworks and supply Water to the said Burgh and places adjacent and for other purposes.
St. Margaret's, Leicester, Select Vestry (Parish Piece) Act 1892	55 & 56 Vict. c. xciii	20 June 1892
An Act for enabling the Select Vestry of the Parish of Saint Margaret in the Borough and County of Leicester to sell and otherwise deal with a piece of Land known as "the Parish Piece" and for empowering the Mayor Aldermen and Burgesses of the said Borough to purchase a portion thereof for the purpose of a Recreation Ground and for providing for the application of the Proceeds of such Sale and for confirming a Charitable Scheme in connexion therewith and for other purposes.
Ipswich Corporation (Purchase of Waterworks) Act 1892	55 & 56 Vict. c. xciv	20 June 1892
An Act to enable the Mayor Aldermen and Burgesses of the Borough of Ipswich to acquire the Undertaking of the Ipswich Waterworks Company and to supply water to the said Borough to issue Corporation Stock and for other purposes.
Southport and Cheshire Lines Extension Railway Act 1892	55 & 56 Vict. c. xcv	20 June 1892
An Act to confer further powers on the Southport and Cheshire Lines Extension Railway Company and for other purposes.
Porthdinlleyn Railway (Abandonment) Act 1892 (repealed)	55 & 56 Vict. c. xcvi	20 June 1892
An Act for the abandonment of the Porthdinlleyn Railway. (Repealed by Statute Law (Repeals) Act 2013 (c. 2))
Union Assurance Society Act 1892	55 & 56 Vict. c. xcvii	20 June 1892
An Act to alter the names of the Union Society and the Union Life Office to repeal certain provisions, of an Act of 1815 (Note: Union Society and Union Life Office Act 1815 (55 Geo. 3. c. xlvi)) relating to the Enrolment of Memorials of the names of Members of the Society and Office in the High Court of Chancery and to provide for the keeping of a register in lieu thereof and for other purposes.
Glasgow and South Western Railway (Ayrshire and Wigtownshire Railway and Bridge Street Joint Station Glasgow) Act 1892	55 & 56 Vict. c. xcviii	20 June 1892
An Act for vesting the Ayrshire and Wigtownshire Railway in the Glasgow and South Western Railway Company for Vesting the Bridge Street Station Glasgow in the Caledonian Railway Company and for other purposes.
London, Chatham and Dover Railway Act 1892	55 & 56 Vict. c. xcix	20 June 1892
An Act to enable the London Chatham and Dover Railway Company to make agreements with the Dover Harbour Board and for other purposes.
South Eastern Railway Act 1892	55 & 56 Vict. c. c	20 June 1892
An Act for conferring further powers on the South Eastern Railway Company and upon the Cranbrook and Paddock Wood Railway Company and for other purposes.
Halifax High Level Railway Act 1892	55 & 56 Vict. c. ci	20 June 1892
An Act for conferring further powers on the Halifax High Level Railway Company in relation to their Undertaking and for other purposes.
Medina Tunnel Act 1892	55 & 56 Vict. c. cii	20 June 1892
An Act for constructing a Tunnel under the River Medina with approaches thereto to connect East and West Cowes and for other purposes.
North Pembrokeshire and Fishguard Railway Act 1892	55 & 56 Vict. c. ciii	20 June 1892
An Act to revive and extend the time for purchasing lands and completing the North Pembrokeshire and Fishguard Railway and for other purposes.
East Grinstead Gas and Water Act 1892	55 & 56 Vict. c. civ	20 June 1892
An Act to confer further powers on the East Grinstead Gas and Water Company and for other purposes.
Leeds and Liverpool Canal Act 1892	55 & 56 Vict. c. cv	20 June 1892
An Act for regulating the rating of the Leeds and Liverpool Canal and for other purposes.
Rhyl District Water Act 1892	55 & 56 Vict. c. cvi	20 June 1892
An Act for conferring further powers upon the Rhyl District Water Company and for other purposes.
Colchester Corporation Act 1892	55 & 56 Vict. c. cvii	20 June 1892
An Act for the transfer of the Navigation from the Hythe at Colchester to Wivenhoe in the County of Essex to the Mayor Aldermen and Burgesses of the Borough of Colchester and for altering the Boundaries of the Wards of the said Borough.
Pontypridd Waterworks Act 1892	55 & 56 Vict. c. cviii	20 June 1892
An Act to authorise the Pontypridd Waterworks Company to construct additional Waterworks for better supplying their district with water and for other purposes.
Mumbles Railway and Pier Act 1892 (repealed)	55 & 56 Vict. c. cix	20 June 1892
An Act to extend the time for the purchase of Lands for and for the completion of the Mumbles Railway and Pier. (Repealed by South Wales Transport Act 1959 (7 & 8 Eliz. 2. c. l))
Glasgow Bridge Act 1892	55 & 56 Vict. c. cx	20 June 1892
An Act to authorise the Glasgow Police Commissioners to reconstruct Glasgow Bridge and for other purposes.
Glasgow Corporation Waterworks Act 1892	55 & 56 Vict. c. cxi	20 June 1892
An Act to authorise the Commissioners of the Glasgow Corporation Waterworks to construct Deviations of their Aqueduct and Works in the Counties of Perth and Stirling and for other purposes.
Liverpool Overhead Railway Act 1892 (repealed)	55 & 56 Vict. c. cxii	20 June 1892
An Act to extend the time for the construction of certain authorised Railways and to authorise the Liverpool Overhead Railway Company to make certain Extension Railways and for other purposes. (Repealed by Liverpool Overhead Railway Act 1956 (4 & 5 Eliz. 2. c. lxxxii))
Great Southern and Western Railway Act 1892	55 & 56 Vict. c. cxiii	20 June 1892
An Act for enabling the Great Southern and Western Railway Company to execute certain Works and acquire certain Lands to purchase the Undertaking of the Kanturk and Newmarket Railway Company to raise further Capital by Debenture Stock and for other purposes.
Horsfall's Patent Act 1892	55 & 56 Vict. c. cxiv	20 June 1892
An Act for rendering valid certain Letters Patent granted to William Horsfall for a new or improved Construction of Furnace for burning Towns' or other refuse.
Nussey and Leachman's and Nussey's Patents Act 1892	55 & 56 Vict. c. cxv	20 June 1892
An Act for rendering valid certain Letters Patent granted to George Henry Nussey and William Bradshaw Leachman (1) for Improvements in Machinery or Apparatus for pressing and tentering Woollen and other Woven or Felted Fabrics (2) for Improvements in Machinery or Apparatus for pressing Woollen and other Woven or Felted Fabrics and (3) to the said George Henry Nussey for an Improved Knitted Fabric.
Whiteheads' and Pickles' Patents Act 1892	55 & 56 Vict. c. cxvi	20 June 1892
An Act for rendering valid certain Letters Patent granted to (1) John Henry Whitehead for Improvements in Feed Boxes of Combing Machines and (2) John Pickles and Henry Walton Whitehead for Improvements in Nobles Combing Machines.
Airdrie and Coatbridge Waterworks Amendment Act 1892	55 & 56 Vict. c. cxvii	20 June 1892
An Act for authorising the Airdrie and Coatbridge Water Company to construct new Works to raise additional Capital and for other purposes.
Blackburn Corporation Act 1892	55 & 56 Vict. c. cxviii	20 June 1892
An Act to consolidate the Townships and parts of Townships within the Borough of Blackburn into one Township to constitute the Council of the said Borough the Burial Board for the said Borough to vest in the Mayor Aldermen and Burgesse3 the Blackburn Technical School and for other purposes.
Worcester and Broom Railway Act 1892 (repealed)	55 & 56 Vict. c. cxix	20 June 1892
An Act to extend the time for the compulsory purchase of Lands and for completing the Worcester and Broom Railway and for other purposes. (Repealed by Worcester and Broom Railway (Abandonment) Act 1894 (57 & 58 Vict. c. xi))
Ashton-under-Lyne, Stalybridge and Dukinfield (District) Waterworks Act 1892 (repealed)	55 & 56 Vict. c. cxx	20 June 1892
An Act to confer further powers on the Ashton-under-Lyne Stalybridge and Dukinfield (District) Waterworks Joint Committee. (Repealed by West Pennine Water Order 1968 (SI 1968/512))
Great Northern Railway Act 1892	55 & 56 Vict. c. cxxi	20 June 1892
An Act to confer farther powers upon the Great Northern Railway Company with respect to their own Undertaking and Undertakings in which they are jointly interested and for other purposes.
London, Brighton and South Coast Railway (Various Powers) Act 1892	55 & 56 Vict. c. cxxii	20 June 1892
An Act to confer further powers on the London Brighton and South Coast Railway Company and for other purposes.
Newport Corporation Act 1892	55 & 56 Vict. c. cxxiii	20 June 1892
An Act to authorise the Mayor Aldermen and Burgesses of the Borough of Newport in the County of Monmouth to construct and work Tramways to collect Municipal Rates and for other purposes.
Taff Vale Railway Act 1892	55 & 56 Vict. c. cxxiv	20 June 1892
An Act to empower the Taff Vale Railway Company to execute Works and acquire Lands and to raise Additional Capital and for other purposes.
Vale of Glamorgan Railway Act 1892	55 & 56 Vict. c. cxxv	20 June 1892
An Act to extend the powers of the Vale of Glamorgan Railway Company for the acquisition of lands for and the completion of their authorised Railways and for other purposes.
Whitland, Cronware and Pendine Railway (Abandonment) Act 1892 (repealed)	55 & 56 Vict. c. cxxvi	20 June 1892
An Act for the abandonment of the Whitland Cronware and Pendine Railway. (Repealed by Statute Law (Repeals) Act 2013 (c. 2))
North British Railway Act 1892	55 & 56 Vict. c. cxxvii	20 June 1892
An Act to authorise the North British Railway Company to acquire additional Lands to extend the time for the purchase of Lands for the purposes of certain Railways and Works authorised by the North British Railway Act 1889 (Note: North British Railway Act 1889 (52 & 53 Vict. c. xc)) and by the West Highland Railway Act 1889 (Note: West Highland Railway Act 1889 (52 & 53 Vict. c. cxxxiv)) to extend the time limited by those Acts for the completion of the Railways thereby authorised to authorise the North British Railway Company to increase their subscription to the West Highland Railway Company and to subscribe to the Kirkcaldy and District Railway Company to raise additional Capital to authorise the repayment of the Eyemouth Railway Deposit Fund and for other purposes.
Wear Valley Extension Railway Act 1892	55 & 56 Vict. c. cxxviii	20 June 1892
An Act for making a Railway from Stanhope to Wearhead in the county of Durham to be called the Wear Valley Extension Railway and for other purposes.
Stratford-upon-Avon, Towcester and Midland Junction Railway Act 1892	55 & 56 Vict. c. cxxix	27 June 1892
An Act to authorise the transfer to the Depositors of the Stock remaining in Court in respect of the Stratford-upon-Avon Towcester and Midland Junction Railway.
London Water Act 1892 (repealed)	55 & 56 Vict. c. cxxx	27 June 1892
An Act with respect to the supply of Water in London and the neighbourhood. (Repealed by Local Law (Greater London Council and Inner London Boroughs) Order 1965 (SI 1965/540))
London and India Docks Act 1892 (repealed)	55 & 56 Vict. c. cxxxi	27 June 1892
An Act to remove doubts as to the interpretation of Section 51 of the London and Saint Katharine and East and West India Docks Act 1888. (Note: London and Saint Katharine and East and West India Docks Act 1888 (51 & 52 Vict. c. cxliii)) (Repealed by Port of London (Consolidation) Act 1920 (10 & 11 Geo. 5. c. clxxiii))
Bradford Corporation Waterworks Act 1892	55 & 56 Vict. c. cxxxii	27 June 1892
An Act for enabling the Mayor Aldermen and Burgesses of the County Borough of Bradford in the West Riding of the County of York to construct and maintain additional Waterworks to relinquish certain powers already authorised to alter certain existing works and for other, purposes connected with the Waterworks Undertaking of the said Mayor Aldermen and Burgesses.
Swansea Corporation Water Act 1892	55 & 56 Vict. c. cxxxiii	27 June 1892
An Act to empower the Mayor Aldermen and Burgesses of the Borough of Swansea to make and maintain additional waterworks and for other purposes.
Liverpool Tramways Act 1892 (repealed)	55 & 56 Vict. c. cxxxiv	27 June 1892
An Act to authorise the Liverpool United Tramways and Omnibus Company to construct new Tramways and for other purposes. (Repealed by Liverpool Corporation Act 1921 (11 & 12 Geo. 5. c. lxxiv))
Trent Navigation Act 1892	55 & 56 Vict. c. cxxxv	27 June 1892
An Act to enable the Trent (Burton-upon-Trent and Humber) Navigation Company to raise additional Capital to change the Name of the Company and for other purposes.
Western Valleys (Monmouthshire) Water and Gas Act 1892	55 & 56 Vict. c. cxxxvi	27 June 1892
An Act for the transfer to and vesting in the Western Valleys (Monmouthshire) Water Company the undertaking of the Risca and Pontymister Gas Company and for other purposes.
Oxford and Aylesbury Tramroad Act 1892	55 & 56 Vict. c. cxxxvii	27 June 1892
An Act to revive the powers and extend the time for the compulsory purchase of Lands for and for the completion of the Tramroad and Works authorised by the Oxford and Aylesbury Tramroad Act 1888. (Note: Oxford and Aylesbury Tramroad Act 1888 (51 & 52 Vict. c. clxxxv))
Chichester Canal Transfer Act 1892	55 & 56 Vict. c. cxxxviii	27 June 1892
An Act to provide for the transfer of the Chichester portion of the Portsmouth and Arundel Navigation to the Corporation of the City of Chichester and for other purposes.
Highland Railway Act 1892	55 & 56 Vict. c. cxxxix	27 June 1892
An Act to enable the Highland Railway Company to construct a deviation Railway and a new Railway and for other purposes.
Mersey Railway Act 1892	55 & 56 Vict. c. cxl	27 June 1892
An Act to authorise the Mersey Railway Company to increase the amount of their First Debenture Stock and to extend the time for redeeming such Stock and for other purposes.
Midland Great Western Railway of Ireland Act 1892 (repealed)	55 & 56 Vict. c. cxli	27 June 1892
An Act to confer further powers on the Midland Great Western Railway of Ireland Company and for other purposes. (Repealed by Statute Law (Repeals) Act 2013 (c. 2))
St. Simon and St. Jude's Church, Anfield Act 1892	55 & 56 Vict. c. cxlii	27 June 1892
An Act to authorise the sale of Saint Barnabas Church Liverpool and the site thereof and the erection of a new Church at Anfield in the parish of Walton-on-the-Hill in the county of Lancaster to be called the Church of Saint Simon and Saint Jude Anfield and to provide for the appointment of Trustees and for other purposes.
Armagh and Keady Light Railway (Release of Deposit) Act 1892	55 & 56 Vict. c. cxliii	27 June 1892
An Act to authorise the release of the deposit with the Supreme Court of Judicature in Ireland with respect to the Armagh and Keady Light Railway.
Buxton Local Board Act 1892 (repealed)	55 & 56 Vict. c. cxliv	27 June 1892
An Act for authorising the Local Board for the District of Buxton in the County of Derby to accept as a gift from the Most Noble Spencer Compton Duke of Devonshire (Note: Spencer Cavendish, 8th Duke of Devonshire.) a new Pump Room and to hold and maintain the same and for conferring powers on the Board in relation to the Local Government of the District and for other purposes. (Repealed by Derbyshire Act 1981 (c. xxxiv))
Epsom Downs Extension Railway Act 1892	55 & 56 Vict. c. cxlv	27 June 1892
An Act for making a Railway from the Epsom Downs Branch of the London Brighton and South Coast Railway to near Walton-on-the-Hill in the County of Surrey and for other purposes.
Glasgow Corporation Act 1892	55 & 56 Vict. c. cxlvi	27 June 1892
An Act to authorise the Corporation of Glasgow to acquire land for a Public Park and for the site of an Infectious Diseases Hospital and to erect such Hospital arid for other purposes.
Stamford and St. Martin Stamford Baron Gas Act 1892	55 & 56 Vict. c. cxlvii	27 June 1892
An Act for repealing an Act of the fourth year of the reign of King George the Fourth (Note: Stamford and St. Martin's Stamford Baron Gas Act 1823 (4 Geo. 4. c. ci)) incorporating the Stamford and Saint Martin's Stamford Baron Gas Light and Coke Company and for extending the limits of supply and defining and regulating the capital and powers of that company and for authorising the company to extend their works and to raise further capital and for other purposes
Westminster (Parliament Street, &c.) Improvements Act 1892	55 & 56 Vict. c. cxlviii	27 June 1892
An Act for amending the Westminster (Parliament Street &c.) Improvements Act 1887 (Note: Westminster (Parliament Street, &c.) Improvements Act 1887 (50 & 51 Vict. c. clxxxiv)) and for reviving the powers granted by that Act for the compulsory purchase of lands and for further extending the period for the completion of the works thereby authorised.
Easton and Church Hope Railway Act 1892	55 & 56 Vict. c. cxlix	27 June 1892
An Act to authorise the Easton and Church Hope Railway Company to re-arrange their capital to extend the time for the completion of their railways and for other purposes.
Brynmawr and Abertillery Gas and Water Act 1892	55 & 56 Vict. c. cl	27 June 1892
An Act to authorise the Brynmawr and Abertillery Gas and Water Company to construct additional Waterworks and to extend their limits for the supply of water and for other purposes.
Lee Valley Drainage Act 1892 (repealed)	55 & 56 Vict. c. cli	27 June 1892
An Act for the drainage of lands in the Valley of the River Lee in the Counties of Middlesex Essex and Hertford and for other purposes. (Repealed by River Lee Conservancy Catchment Board (Abolition of Internal Drainage Districts) Order 1934 (SR&O 1934/92))
Great Northern Railway (Ireland) Act 1892	55 & 56 Vict. c. clii	27 June 1892
An Act to enable the Great Northern Railway Company (Ireland) to extend their Railway to Ardee in the County of Louth and to acquire the Undertaking of the Enniskillen Bundoran and Sligo Railway Company and for other purposes.
Liskeard and Caradon Railway Act 1892	55 & 56 Vict. c. cliii	27 June 1892
An Act for conferring further powers on the Liskeard and Caradon Railway Company for the completion of the Railway authorised by the Liskeard and Caradon Railway Act 1884 (Note: Liskeard and Caradon Railway Act 1884 (47 & 48 Vict. c. cxcv)) and for constituting that Railway a separate undertaking and for other purposes.
Hull and North Western Junction Railway (Extension of Time) Act 1892 (repealed)	55 & 56 Vict. c. cliv	27 June 1892
An Act to extend the periods limited for the compulsory purchase of Lands for and for the completion of the authorised Railways of the Hull and North Western Junction Railway Company. (Repealed by Hull and North Western Junction Railway (Abandonment) Act 1894 (57 & 58 Vict. c. xiii))
North Sunderland Railway Act 1892	55 & 56 Vict. c. clv	27 June 1892
An Act for making a railway in the county of Northumberland from the Chathill Station of the North Eastern Railway Company to Sea-Houses and for other purposes.
Lancashire, Derbyshire and East Coast Railway Act 1892	55 & 56 Vict. c. clvi	27 June 1892
An Act to authorise the Lancashire Derbyshire and East Coast Railway Company to construct Branch Railways and other works to acquire the Undertaking of the North Sea Fisheries (East Lincolnshire) Harbour and Dock Company and for other purposes.
Cork Harbour (Pilotage) Act 1892	55 & 56 Vict. c. clvii	27 June 1892
An Act to confer further powers on the Cork Harbour Commissioners with respect to Pilotage and for other purposes.
Weston-super-Mare, Clevedon and Portishead Tramways Act 1892	55 & 56 Vict. c. clviii	27 June 1892
An Act to revive the powers granted by the Weston-super-Mare Clevedon and Portishead Tramways Act 1885 (Note: Weston-super-Mare, Clevedon and Portishead Tramways Act 1885 (48 & 49 Vict. c. clxxxii)) with respect to the construction of the Tramways thereby authorised and to authorise the Weston-super-Mare Clevedon and Portishead Tramways Company to construct additional Tramroads and for other purposes.
Rhyl Improvement Act 1892 (repealed)	55 & 56 Vict. c. clix	27 June 1892
An Act to authorise the Rhyl Improvement Commissioner to purchase the Undertaking of the Rhyl District Water Company to embank and reclaim the Foryd Mudlands adjoining the River Clwyd in the County of Flint and to confer further powers on the Commissioners. (Repealed by Clwyd County Council Act 1985 (c. xliv))
North Metropolitan Tramways Act 1892	55 & 56 Vict. c. clx	27 June 1892
An Act for confirming the purchase by the North Metropolitan Tramways Company of the tramways of the North London Tramways Company for empowering the North Metropolitan Tramways Company to construct new tramways and for other purposes.
Donegal Railway Act 1892	55 & 56 Vict. c. clxi	27 June 1892
An Act for the Amalgamation of the Undertakings of the Finn Valley Railway Company and the West Donegal Railway Company and for other purposes.
Plymouth Tramways Act 1892 (repealed)	55 & 56 Vict. c. clxii	27 June 1892
An Act to revive the powers and extend the time for completion and opening of the Plymouth Tramways to authorise and confirm an Agreement between the Plymouth Tramways Company and the Mayor Aldermen and Burgesses of the borough of Plymouth and for other purposes. (Repealed by Plymouth Corporation Act 1915 (5 & 6 Geo. 5. c. lxix))
Bournemouth Improvement Act 1892 (repealed)	55 & 56 Vict. c. clxiii	27 June 1892
An Act to make further provision for the Health Improvement and Local Government of the Borough of Bournemouth and for other purposes. (Repealed by Bournemouth Borough Council Act 1985 (c. v))
Lambourn Valley Railway Act 1892	55 & 56 Vict. c. clxiv	27 June 1892
An Act to revive and extend the time for completing and opening the Lambourn Valley Railway and for other purposes.
Glasgow Police (Further Powers) Act 1892 (repealed)	55 & 56 Vict. c. clxv	27 June 1892
An Act to confer further Police Powers on the Glasgow Police Commissioners and on the Magistrates and the Magistrates' Committee of the City and Royal Burgh of Glasgow. (Repealed by Statute Law (Repeals) Act 1995 (c. 44))
Middlesbrough Corporation Act 1892 (repealed)	55 & 56 Vict. c. clxvi	27 June 1892
An Act to make better provision for the Government and Improvement of the Borough of Middlesbrough and for other purposes (Repealed by Middlesbrough Corporation Act 1933 (23 & 24 Geo. 5. c. lxxxiii))
London and North Western Railway (Additional Powers) Act 1892	55 & 56 Vict. c. clxvii	27 June 1892
An Act for conferring further powers upon the London and North Western Railway Company in relation to their own Undertaking and other Undertakings in which they are interested jointly with other Companies and also for conferring Powers upon the Lancashire and Yorkshire Railway Company the Great Western Railway Company the Shropshire Union Railways and Canal Company and the North Staffordshire Railway Company in relation to such other Undertakings and for other purposes.
London and North Western Railway (New Railway) Act 1892	55 & 56 Vict. c. clxviii	27 June 1892
An Act for empowering the London and North Western Railway Company to construct new and widen existing Railways in the Counties of Warwick and Lancaster and the West Riding of the County of York and for conferring powers upon that Company and the Midland Railway Company in relation to some of such Railways and for other purposes.
Lanarkshire (Middle Ward District) Water Act 1892 (repealed)	55 & 56 Vict. c. clxix	27 June 1892
An Act to empower the District Committee of the Middle Ward of the County of Lanark to construct Waterworks and to supply Water within their District and to authorise and require the County Council of the County of Lanark to levy assessments and to borrow money for such Waterworks and supply and for other purposes. (Repealed by Lanarkshire County Council Order Confirmation Act 1939 (2 & 3 Geo. 6. c. xcii))
Dumbarton and Balloch Joint Line, &c. Act 1892	55 & 56 Vict. c. clxx	27 June 1892
An Act to give effect to certain Agreements between the Caledonian North British and Lanarkshire and Dumbartonshire Railway Companies and to confer powers on them with respect to joint, ownership of the Railway between Dumbarton and Balloch and the Pier at Balloch and the joint acquisition and working of Steamboats on Loch Lomond and other matters to authorise the construction of certain Railways and Works at or near Dumbarton and for other purposes.
Milford Docks Act 1892 (repealed)	55 & 56 Vict. c. clxxi	27 June 1892
An Act to confer further powers upon the Milford Docks Company and for other purposes. (Repealed by Milford Docks Act 1953 (1 & 2 Eliz. 2. c. x))
Kingstown and Kingsbridge Junction Railway (Extension of Time) Act 1892 (repealed)	55 & 56 Vict. c. clxxii	27 June 1892
An Act to revive the powers for the compulsory purchase of Lands and to extend the time limited for the completion of certain of the Railways and for the abandonment of one of the Railways authorised by the Kingstown and Kingsbridge Junction Railway Act 1887 (Note: Kingstown and Kingsbridge Junction Railway Act 1887 (50 & 51 Vict. c. clxix)) and for other purposes. (Repealed by Kingstown and Kingsbridge Junction Railway (Abandonment) Act 1898 (61 & 62 Vict. c. ccxlvi))
Birmingham Corporation Water Act 1892	55 & 56 Vict. c. clxxiii	27 June 1892
An Act for empowering the corporation of the city of Birmingham to obtain a supply of water from the rivers Elan and Claerwen and for other purposes.
Exmouth and District Water Act 1892	55 & 56 Vict. c. clxxiv	27 June 1892
An Act for conferring further powers upon the Exmouth and District Waterworks Company.
Lancashire and Yorkshire Railway (Steam Vessels) Act 1892	55 & 56 Vict. c. clxxv	27 June 1892
An Act to authorise the Lancashire and Yorkshire Railway Company to provide Steam Vessels to ply between the Ports of Fleetwood and Dublin and for other purposes.
Lancashire and Yorkshire Railway (Various Powers) Act 1892	55 & 56 Vict. c. clxxvi	27 June 1892
An Act for conferring further powers on the Lancashire and Yorkshire Railway Company with relation to their own Undertaking and upon that Company and the London and North Western Railway Company in respect of Undertakings in which they are jointly interested and for other purposes.
Leith Harbour and Docks Act 1892 (repealed)	55 & 56 Vict. c. clxxvii	27 June 1892
An Act to amend the Leith Harbour and Docks Act 1875 (Note: Leith Harbour and Docks Act 1875 (38 & 39 Vict. c. clx)) to authorise the construction of a Wet Dock and other Harbour Work* and for other purposes. (Repealed by Leith Harbour and Docks Consolidation Order Confirmation Act 1935 (25 & 26 Geo. 5. c. liv))
London and North Western Railway (Heaton Lodge and Wortley Railways) Act 1892	55 & 56 Vict. c. clxxviii	27 June 1892
An Act for empowering the London and North Western Railway Company to construct new Railways in the West Riding of the County of York to be called the Heaton Lodge and Wortley Railways and for other purposes.
Rhondda and Swansea Bay Railway Act 1892	55 & 56 Vict. c. clxxix	27 June 1892
An Act for enabling the Rhondda and Swansea Bay Railway Company to extend their Railways to Swansea and Neath and for other purposes.
Southampton Docks Act 1892	55 & 56 Vict. c. clxxx	27 June 1892
An Act to authorise the transfer of the Undertaking of the Southampton Dock Company to the London and South Western Railway Company.
Rotherham, Blyth and Sutton Railway Act 1892	55 & 56 Vict. c. clxxxi	27 June 1892
An Act to authorise the construction of New Railways in the West Riding of the County of York from Maltby to Mexborough and for other purposes.
Lostwithiel and Fowey Railway Act 1892	55 & 56 Vict. c. clxxxii	27 June 1892
An Act to authorise the transfer of the undertaking of the Lostwithiel and Fowey Railway Company to the Cornwall Minerals Railway Company and for other purposes.
St. Bartholomew's (Bristol) Church, &c. Sale Act 1892	55 & 56 Vict. c. clxxxiii	27 June 1892
An Act for authorising the sale of the Church and Parochial Schools and Vicarage House of the Parish of Saint Bartholomew in the City of Bristol and the application of the proceeds of sale to the provision of a new Church and Vicarage House for a district out of the new Parish of Saint Andrew Montpelier in the said City and to other purposes and for reuniting the said Parish of Saint Bartholomew for Ecclesiastical purposes to the Parish of Saint James and for enabling the Ecclesiastical Commissioners to dispose of the site and materials of the unfinished Church . of Saint Martin and for other purposes.
Edinburgh Street Tramways Act 1892 (repealed)	55 & 56 Vict. c. clxxxiv	27 June 1892
An Act to authorise agreements between the Edinburgh Street Tramways Company and Local Authorities and for other purposes. (Repealed by Edinburgh Corporation Order Confirmation Act 1932 (22 & 23 Geo. 5. c. vii))
Derry City and County Railway Act 1892	55 & 56 Vict. c. clxxxv	27 June 1892
An Act to authorise the construction of a Railway between Londonderry and Draperstown and for other purposes.
Glasgow and South Western Railway (Additional Powers) Act 1892	55 & 56 Vict. c. clxxxvi	27 June 1892
An Act for conferring further powers on the Glasgow and South Western Railway Company for the construction of works the acquisition of lands and the raising of money and for other purposes.
Pontypridd Burial Board Act 1892 (repealed)	55 & 56 Vict. c. clxxxvii	27 June 1892
An Act for the constitution of the Pontypridd Burial Board in the County of Glamorgan and for other purposes. (Repealed by Mid Glamorgan County Council Act 1987 (c. vii))
Regent's Canal City and Docks Railway Act 1892	55 & 56 Vict. c. clxxxviii	27 June 1892
An Act for the abandonment of certain of the authorised Railways of the Regent's Canal City and Docks Railway Company for extending the period for the compulsory purchase of lands for and for the completion of others of such authorised Railways for changing the name of the Company for making other provisions with respect to the Company and their affairs and for other purposes.
Uttoxeter Water Act 1892	55 & 56 Vict. c. clxxxix	27 June 1892
An Act for enabling the Uttoxeter Rural Sanitary Authority to provide an improved Water Supply to certain places within their District.
Rhymney Valley Gas and Water Act 1892	55 & 56 Vict. c. cxc	27 June 1892
An Act for incorporating the Rhymney Valley Gas and Water Company and conferring powers on them for the construction of works the supply of Gas and Water and for other purposes.
Mersey and Irwell Joint Committee Act 1892 (repealed)	55 & 56 Vict. c. cxci	27 June 1892
An Act to make more effectual provision for Prevention of the Pollution of the Rivers Mersey and Irwell and their tributaries. (Repealed by Lancashire County Council (Rivers Board and General Powers) Act 1938 (1 & 2 Geo. 6. c. xciv))
Bexhill Water and Gas Act 1892	55 & 56 Vict. c. cxcii	27 June 1892
An Act for authorising the Bexhill Water and Gas Company to raise additional Capital.
Eastbourne Improvement Act 1885 Amendment Act 1892 (repealed)	55 & 56 Vict. c. cxciii	27 June 1892
An Act to repeal the 169th Section of the Eastbourne Improvement Act 1885. (Note: Eastbourne Improvement Act 1885 (48 & 49 Vict. c. clxv)) (Repealed by East Sussex Act 1981 (c. xxv))
Tramways Orders Confirmation Act 1892	55 & 56 Vict. c. cxciv	27 June 1892
An Act to confirm certain Provisional Orders made by the Board of Trade under the Tramways Act, 1870, (Note: Tramways Act 1870 (33 & 34 Vict. c. 78)) relating to Birmingham and Western Districts Tramways, Drypool and Marfleet Steam Tramways, Morecambe Tramways (Extension), and Northampton Street Tramways.
	Birmingham and Western Districts Tramways (Abandonment) Order 1892	
	Drypool and Marfleet Steam Tramways Order 1892	
	Morecambe Tramways (Extension) Order 1892	
	Northampton Street Tramways Order 1892	
Glasgow, &c. Order Confirmation Act 1892	55 & 56 Vict. c. cxcv	27 June 1892
An Act to confirm an Order of the Boundary Commissioners for Scotland relating to the burgh and city of Glasgow, the burgh of Renfrew, and to the parishes of Cathcart, Eastwood, Govan, and Renfrew, in the counties of Lanark and Renfrew.
	Glasgow, Renfrew, Cathcart, Eastwood, Govan and Renfrew (Lanarkshire and Renfrewshire) Order 1892	
Gas Orders Confirmation (No. 2) Act 1892	55 & 56 Vict. c. cxcvi	27 June 1892
An Act to confirm certain Provisional Orders made by the Board of Trade under the Gas and Water Works Facilities Act, 1870, relating to Bideford Gas, Glastonbury and Street Gas, Prestatyn Gas, and Willenhall Gas.
	Bideford Gas Order 1892	
	Glastonbury and Street Gas Order 1892	
	Prestatyn Gas Order 1892	
	Willenhall Gas Order 1892	
Local Government Board's Provisional Orders Confirmation (No. 6) Act 1892	55 & 56 Vict. c. cxcvii	27 June 1892
An Act to confirm certain Provisional Orders of the Local Government Board relating to the Boroughs of Chard and Henley-upon-Thames.
	Borough of Chard Order 1892	
	Borough of Henley-upon-Thames Order 1892	
Local Government Board's Provisional Orders Confirmation (No. 7) Act 1892	55 & 56 Vict. c. cxcviii	27 June 1892
An Act to confirm certain Provisional Orders of the Local Government Board relating to the Havant, Tamworth, Warwick, and Wallsend, Willington Quay, and Howdon Joint Hospital Districts, and to the Upper Stour Valley Main Sewerage District.
	Havant Joint Hospital Order 1892	
	Tamworth Joint Hospital Order 1892	
	Upper Stour Valley Main Sewerage Order 1892	
	Warwick Joint Hospital Order 1892	
	Wallsend, Willington Quay and Howdon Joint Hospital Order 1892	
Local Government Board's Provisional Orders Confirmation (No. 8) Act 1892	55 & 56 Vict. c. cxcix	27 June 1892
An Act to confirm certain Provisional Orders of the Local Government Board relating to the Urban Sanitary District of Burnley, Paignton, and Penzance, and to the Rural Sanitary Districts of the Blything and Hendon Unions.
	Blything Union Order 1892	
	Burnley Order 1892	
	Hendon Union Order 1892	
	Paignton Order 1892	
	Penzance Order 1892	
Local Government Board's Provisional Orders Confirmation (No. 9) Act 1892	55 & 56 Vict. c. cc	27 June 1892
An Act to confirm certain Provisional Orders of the Local Government Board relating to the Urban Sanitary Districts of Bradford (Yorks), Halifax, Rawmarsh, Sheffield, and Shipley.
	Bradford (Yorkshire) Order 1892	
	Halifax Order (3) 1892	
	Rawmarsh Order 1892	
	Sheffield Order 1892	
	Shipley Order 1892	
Local Government Board's Provisional Orders Confirmation (No. 11) Act 1892	55 & 56 Vict. c. cci	27 June 1892
An Act to confirm certain Provisional Orders of the Local Government Board relating to the Boroughs of Crewe, Falmouth, and Godalming.
	Borough of Crewe Order 1892	
	Borough of Falmouth Order 1892	
	Borough of Godalming Order 1892	
Local Government Board's Provisional Orders Confirmation (No. 13) Act 1892	55 & 56 Vict. c. ccii	27 June 1892
An Act to confirm certain Provisional Orders of the Local Government Board relating to the Urban Sanitary Districts of Bilston, Morley, and West Ham.
	Bilston Order 1892	
	Morley Order 1892	
	West Ham Order 1892	
Local Government Board's Provisional Order Confirmation (Poor Law) Act 1892	55 & 56 Vict. c. cciii	27 June 1892
An Act to confirm a Provisional Order of the Local Government Board under the provisions of the Poor Law Amendment Act, 1867, (Note: Poor Law Amendment Act 1867 (30 & 31 Vict. c. 106)) relating to the Hundred of Mutford and Lothiogland.
	Hundred of Mutford and Lothingland (Suffolk) Order 1892	
Pier and Harbour Orders Confirmation (No.3) Act 1892	55 & 56 Vict. c. cciv	27 June 1892
An Act to confirm certain Provisional Orders made by the Board of Trade under the General Pier and Harbour Act, 1861, relating to Killala, Stornoway, Sutherland, and Torquay.
	Killala Pier Order 1892	
	Torquay Harbour Order 1892	
Pier and Harbour Orders Confirmation (No. 4) Act 1892	55 & 56 Vict. c. ccv	27 June 1892
An Act to confirm certain Provisional Orders made by the Board of Trade under the General Pier and Harbour Act, 1861, relating to Carloway and Kinsale.
	Carloway Harbour Order 1892	
	Kinsale Harbour Order 1892	
Pier and Harbour Order Confirmation (No. 5) Act 1892	55 & 56 Vict. c. ccvi	27 June 1892
An Act to confirm a Provisional Order made by the Board of Trade under the General Pier and Harbour Act, 1861, relating to Bournemouth.
	Bournemouth Pier Order 1892	
Land Drainage Supplemental Act 1892 (repealed)	55 & 56 Vict. c. ccvii	27 June 1892
An Act to confirm a Provisional Order under the Land Drainage Act, 1861, (Note: Land Drainage Act 1861 (24 & 25 Vict. c. 133)) relating to Morton Fen, in the Parish of Morton, in the County of Lincoln. (Repealed by Statute Law (Repeals) Act 1993 (c. 50))
Metropolitan Police Provisional Order Confirmation Act 1892 (repealed)	55 & 56 Vict. c. ccviii	27 June 1892
An Act to confirm a Provisional Order made by one of Her Majesty's Principal Secretaries of State under the Metropolitan Police Act, 1886, (Note: Metropolitan Police Act 1886 (49 & 50 Vict. c. 22)) relating to lands in the Parishes of St. Marylebone, St. Mary Abbotts, Kensington, and All Saints, Poplar. (Repealed by Statute Law (Repeals) Act 2008 (c. 12))
Local Government Board (Ireland) Provisional Orders Confirmation (No. 2) Act 1892	55 & 56 Vict. c. ccix	27 June 1892
An Act to confirm two Provisional Orders made by the Local Government Board for Ireland under the Public Health (Ireland) Act, 1878, relating to the Purchase of Land for Burial Grounds in the Poor Law Union of Sligo.
	Tawnagh Burial Ground Provisional Order 1892	
	Ballynakill Burial Ground Provisional Order 1892	
Local Government Board (Ireland) Provisional Order Confirmation (No. 3) Act 1892	55 & 56 Vict. c. ccx	27 June 1892
An Act to confirm a Provisional Order made by the Local Government Board for Ireland confirming an Improvement Scheme under Part I. of the Housing of the Working Classes Act, 1890, (Note: Housing of the Working Classes Act 1890 (53 & 54 Vict. c. 70)) relating to the City of Belfast.
	Belfast Order 1892	
Local Government Board (Ireland) Provisional Order Confirmation (No. 4) Act 1892	55 & 56 Vict. c. ccxi	27 June 1892
An Act to confirm a Provisional Order made by the Local Government Board for Ireland under the Public Health (Ireland) Act, 1878, relating to the improvement of Streets in the Township of Blackrock.
	Blackrock Provisional Order 1892	
Local Government Board (Ireland) Provisional Order Confirmation (No. 5) Act 1892	55 & 56 Vict. c. ccxii	27 June 1892
An Act to confirm a Provisional Order made by the Local Government Board for Ireland under the Public Health (Ireland) Act, 1878, relating to the purchase of Land for Waterworks in the Poor Law Union of Tullamore.
	Tullamore Waterworks Provisional Order 1892	
Local Government Board (Ireland) Provisional Order Confirmation (No. 7) Act 1892	55 & 56 Vict. c. ccxiii	27 June 1892
An Act to confirm a Provisional Order made by the Local Government Board for Ireland under the Public Health (Ireland) Act, 1878, relating to the Rural Sanitary District of Fermoy.
	Kilworth Waterworks Provisional Order 1892	
Local Government Board (Ireland) Provisional Orders Confirmation (No. 8) Act 1892	55 & 56 Vict. c. ccxiv	27 June 1892
An Act to confirm four Provisional Orders made by the Local Government Board for Ireland under the Public Health (Ireland) Act, 1878, relating to the Purchase of Lands for Waterworks for the towns of Athlone, Castletown-Berehaven, Cookstown, and Skibbereen.
	Athlone Waterworks Provisional Order 1892	
	Castletown-Berehaven Waterworks Provisional Order 1892	
	Cookstown Waterworks Provisional Order 1892	
	Skibbereen Waterworks Provisional Order 1892	
Local Government Board (Ireland) Provisional Order Confirmation (No. 9) Act 1892	55 & 56 Vict. c. ccxv	27 June 1892
An Act to confirm a Provisional Order made by the Local Government Board for Ireland under the Public Health (Ireland) Act, 1878, relating to the Town of Tralee.
	Tralee Provisional Order 1892	
Local Government Board (Ireland) Provisional Order Confirmation (No. 10) Act 1892	55 & 56 Vict. c. ccxvi	27 June 1892
An Act to con firm a Provisional Order made by the Local Government Board for Ireland under the Public Health (Ireland) Act, 1878, relating to the Drainage of the City of Dublin, and to enable the Corporation of Dublin to borrow in excess of their Statutory Powers.
	Dublin Main Drainage Provisional Order 1892	
Galway Hospital Act 1892 (repealed)	55 & 56 Vict. c. ccxvii	27 June 1892
An Act to provide for the re-constitution of the Galway Infirmary and for other purposes connected therewith. (Repealed by Statute Law (Repeals) Act 2013 (c. 2))
Education Department Provisional Order Confirmation (London) Act 1892	55 & 56 Vict. c. ccxviii	27 June 1892
An Act to confirm a Provisional Order made by the Education Department under the Elementary Education Act, 1870, (Note: Elementary Education Act 1870 (33 & 34 Vict. c. 75)) to enable the School Board for London to put in force the Lands Clauses Consolidation Act, 1845, (Note: Lands Clauses Consolidation Act 1845 (8 & 9 Vict. c. 18)) and the Acts amending the same.
	School Board for London Order 1892 The School Board for London. Provisional Order for putting in force the Lands Clauses Consolidation Act, 1845.	
Electric Lighting Orders Confirmation (No. 4) Act 1892	55 & 56 Vict. c. ccxix	27 June 1892
An Act to confirm certain Provisional Orders made by the Board of Trade under the Electric Lighting Acts, 1882 and 1888, relating to Dublin, Fareham, Liverpool, Oxford, Sheffield, and Waterford.
	Dublin Electric Lighting Order 1892 Provisional Order granted by the Board of Trade under the Electric Lighting Acts 1882 and 1888 to the Corporation of Dublin in respect of the city of Dublin.	
	Fareham Electric Lighting Order 1892 Provisional Order granted by the Board of Trade under the Electric Lighting Acts 1882 and 1888 to the Fareham Electric Light Company Limited in respect of the district of the Fareham Urban Sanitary Authority in the county of Southampton.	
	Liverpool Electric Lighting Order 1892 Provisional Order granted by the Board of Trade under the Electric Lighting Acts 1882, and 1888, to the Liverpool Electric Supply Company, Limited, in respect of a portion of the City of Liverpool.	
	Oxford Electric Lighting Order 1892 Provisional Order granted by the Board of Trade under the Electric Lighting Acts 1882 and 1888 transferring to the Oxford Electric Company Limited the undertaking authorised by the Oxford Electric Lighting Order 1890.	
	Sheffield Electric Lighting Order 1892 Provisional Order granted by the Board of Trade under the Electric Lighting Acts 1882 and 1888 to the Sheffield Electric Light and Power Company Limited in respect of the Municipal and County Borough of Sheffield in the County of York.	
	Waterford Electric Lighting Order 1892 Provisional Order granted by the Board of Trade under the Electric Lighting Acts 1882 and 1888 to the Mayor Aldermen and Burgesses of the Borough of Waterford in respect of the Borough of Waterford.	
Electric Lighting Orders Confirmation (No. 6) Act 1892	55 & 56 Vict. c. ccxx	27 June 1892
An Act to confirm certain Provisional Orders made by the Board of Trade under the Electric Lighting Acts, 1882 and 1888, relating to Hampstead, Lambeth, Shoreditch, and Whitechapel.
	Hampstead (London) Electric Lighting Order 1892 Provisional Order granted by the Board of Trade under the Electric Lighting Acts 1882 and 1888 to the Vestry of the Parish of Saint John Hampstead in the Administrative County of London in respect of the Parish of Saint John Hampstead.	
	Lambeth Electric Lighting Order 1892 Provisional Order granted by the Board of Trade under the Electric Lighting Acts 1882 and 1888 to the Vestry of the Parish of Lambeth in respect of the portion of the Parish of Lambeth in the Administrative County of London.	
	Shoreditch Electric Lighting Order 1892 Provisional Order granted by the Board of Trade under the Electric Lighting Acts 1882 and 1888 to the Vestry of the Parish of St. Leonard Shoreditch in the County of London in respect of the Parish of St. Leonard Shoreditch.	
	Whitechapel District Electric Lighting Order 1892 Provisional Order granted by the Board of Trade under the Electric Lighting Acts 1882 and 1888 to the Board of Works for the Whitechapel District in the Administrative County of London in respect of the Whitechapel District.	
General Police and Improvement (Scotland) Act 1862 Order Confirmation (Inverness) Act 1892	55 & 56 Vict. c. ccxxi	27 June 1892
An Act to confirm a Provisional Order under the General Police and Improvement (Scotland) Act, 1862, (Note: General Police and Improvement (Scotland) Act 1862 (25 & 26 Vict. c. 101)) relating to the Burgh of Inverness.
	Inverness Order 1892 General Police and Improvement Scotland Act, 1862. (25 & 26 Vict. cap. 101.)	
Local Government Board's Provisional Orders Confirmation (No. 10) Act 1892	55 & 56 Vict. c. ccxxii	28 June 1892
An Act to confirm certain Provisional Orders of the Local Government Board relating to the Boroughs of Halifax and Hertford.
	Borough of Halifax Order 1892 Provisional Order made in pursuance of Sections 54 and 59 of the Local Government Act, 1888. (Note: Local Government Act 1888 (51 & 52 Vict. c. 41))	
	Borough of Hertford Order 1892 Provisional Order made in pursuance of Sections 54 and 59 of the Local Government Act, 1888.	
Local Government Board's Provisional Orders Confirmation (No. 12) Act 1892	55 & 56 Vict. c. ccxxiii	28 June 1892
An Act to confirm certain Provisional Orders of the Local Government Beard relating to the Urban Sanitary Districts of Bath, Cheltenham, Louth, Nottingham and West Bridgeford, Portsmouth, Salford, and Wallasey.
	Bath Order 1892 Provisional Order for altering a Confirming Act. (Note: Local Government Board's Provisional Orders Confirmation (No. 6) Act 1887 (50 & 51 Vict. c. cxi))	
	Cheltenham Order 1892 Provisional Order for altering the Cheltenham Improvement Act, 1889. (Note: Cheltenham Improvement Act 1889 (52 & 53 Vict. c. clxxxiv))	
	Louth Order 1892 Provisional Order for partially repealing and altering a Local Act. (Note: Louth Improvement Act 1825 (6 Geo. 4. c. cxxix))	
	Nottingham and West Bridgeford Order 1892 Provisional Order for altering certain Local Acts. (Note: Nottingham Improvement Act 1879 (42 & 43 Vict. c. cciv)) (Note: Nottingham Waterworks Act 1879 (42 & 43 Vict. c. xi))	
	Portsmouth Order 1892 Provisional Order for altering the Portsmouth Corporation Act, 1883. (Note: Portsmouth Corporation Act 1883 (46 & 47 Vict. c. ccxi))	
	Salford Order 1892 Provisional Order for altering certain Local Acts (Note: Salford Improvement Act 1862 (25 & 26 Vict. c. ccv)) (Note: Salford Improvement Act 1867 (30 & 31 Vict. c. lviii)) (Note: Salford Improvement Act 1870 (33 & 34 Vict. c. cxxix)) (Note: Salford Improvement Act 1871 (34 & 35 Vict. c. cx)) (Note: Salford Tramways and Improvement Act 1875 (38 & 39 Vict. c. ci)) and Confirming Acts. (Note: Local Government Board's Provisional Order Confirmation (No. 8) Act 1882 (45 & 46 Vict. c. xcvii)) (Note: Local Government Board's Provisional Orders Confirmation (No. 14) Act 1891 (54 & 55 Vict. c. ccxi))	
	Wallasey Order 1892 Provisional Order for altering certain Local Acts (Note: Wallasey Improvement Act 1858 (21 & 22 Vict. c. lxiii)) (Note: Wallasey Improvement Act 1861 (24 & 25 Vict. c. iv)) (Note: Wallasey Improvement Act 1867 (30 & 31 Vict. c.cxxxii)) and Confirming Acts. (Note: Local Government Board's Provisional Orders Confirmation (Caistor Union, &c.) Act 1877 (40 & 41 Vict. c. ccxxvii)) (Note: Local Government Board's Provisional Orders Confirmation (No. 7) Act 1883 (46 & 47 Vict. c. cxxxvii))	
Local Government Board's Provisional Order Confirmation (No. 14) Act 1892	55 & 56 Vict. c. ccxxiv	28 June 1892
An Act to confirm a Provisional Order of the Local Government Board relating to the Borough of Chesterfield.
	Borough of Chesterfield Order 1892 Provisional Order made in pursuance of Sections 54 and 59 of the Local Government Act, 1888.	
Local Government Board's Provisional Order Confirmation (No. 15) Act 1892 (repealed)	55 & 56 Vict. c. ccxxv	28 June 1892
An Act to confirm a Provisional Order of the Local Government Board relating to the Borough of Richmond (Surrey). (Repealed by Local Law (North West London Boroughs) Order 1965 (SI 1965/533))
	Borough of Richmond (Surrey) Order 1892 Provisional Order made in pursuance of Sections 54 and 59 of the Local Government Act 1888.	
Water Orders Confirmation Act 1892	55 & 56 Vict. c. ccxxvi	28 June 1892
An Act to confirm certain Provisional Orders made by the Board of Trade under the Gas and Water Works Facilities Act, 1870, relating to Ross Water and Sevenoaks Water.
	Ross Water Order 1892 Order authorising the maintenance and continuance of Waterworks and the supply of Water in parts of the parishes of Ross and Bridstow, both in the county of Hereford.	
	Sevenoaks Water Order 1892 Order empowering the Sevenoaks Waterworks Company to raise additional Capital.	
Electric Lighting Orders Confirmation (No. 5) Act 1892	55 & 56 Vict. c. ccxxvii	28 June 1892
An Act to confirm certain Provisional Orders made by the Board of Trade under the Electric Lighting Acts, 1882 and 1888, relating to the County of London (a portion of), Southwark, and Wandsworth.
	County of London (North) Electric Lighting Order 1892 Provisional Order granted by the Board of Trade under the Electric Lighting Acts 1882 and 1888 to the County of London Electric Lighting Company Limited in respect of a portion of the County of London.	
	Southwark Electric Lighting Order 1892 Provisional Order granted by the Board of Trade under the Electric Lighting Acts 1882 and 1888 to the County of London Electric Lighting Company Limited in respect of the Parish of St. George the Martyr Southwark.	
	Wandsworth Electric Lighting Order 1892 Provisional Order granted by the Board of Trade under the Electric Lighting Acts 1882 and 1888 to the County of London Electric Lighting Company Limited in respect of Wandsworth.	
Newport Pagnell and District Tramways Act 1892	55 & 56 Vict. c. ccxxviii	28 June 1892
An Act to revive powers for and to extend the time for the construction and completion of the Tramways authorised by the Newport Pagnell and District Tramways Order 1887 confirmed by the Tramways Orders Confirmation (No. 2) Act 1887. (Note: Tramways Orders Confirmation (No. 2) Act 1887 (50 & 51 Vict. c. cxxiii))
Simpson's and Fawcett's Patent Act 1892	55 & 56 Vict. c. ccxxix	28 June 1892
An Act for rendering valid certain Letters Patent granted to James Simpson and Samuel Thomas Fawcett for Improvements in the Construction of Perambulators.
Imperial Life Insurance Company Act 1892	55 & 56 Vict. c. ccxxx	28 June 1892
An Act to provide for repealing the Deed of Settlement of the Imperial Life Insurance Company and the Act (Note: Imperial Life Insurance Company Act 1841 (4 & 5 Vict. c. xciv)) relating thereto and to define the objects and powers of that Company.
Belfast District (Lunatic Asylums, &c.) Act 1892	55 & 56 Vict. c. ccxxxi	28 June 1892
An Act to constitute the City of Belfast a Separate District with an Asylum for the Lunatic Poor and for other purposes.
Lancashire and Yorkshire and London and North Western Railway Companies (Steam Vessels) Act 1892	55 & 56 Vict. c. ccxxxii	28 June 1892
An Act to extend and enlarge the powers of the Lancashire and Yorkshire Railway Company and the London and North Western Railway Company as to Steam Vessels and for other purposes.
Great Western Railway Act 1892	55 & 56 Vict. c. ccxxxiii	28 June 1892
An Act for conferring further powers upon the Great Western Railway Company in respect of their own undertaking and upon that Company and the London and North Western Railway Company in respect of undertakings in which they are jointly interested for amalgamating the Calne the Newent the Ross and Ledbury and the Wellington and Severn Junction Railway Companies with the Great Western Railway Company for vesting in that Company the powers of the East Usk Railway Company for vesting the undertaking of the Ludlow and Clee Hill Railway Company in the Great Western and London and North Western Railway Companies and for other purposes.
Midland Railway Act 1892	55 & 56 Vict. c. ccxxxiv	28 June 1892
An Act to confer additional powers upon the Midland Railway Company and upon that Company and the Great Northern and North Eastern Railway Companies respectively for the construction of Works and the acquisition of Lands to confirm an Agreement between the Midland Railway Company and the Guiseley Yeadon and Headingley Railway Company to empower the Midland Railway Company to increase their Subscription to the Undertaking of the Tottenham and Forest Gate Railway Company and for other purposes.
Dundee Extension and Improvement Act 1892 (repealed)	55 & 56 Vict. c. ccxxxv	28 June 1892
An Act to extend the Municipal and Police Boundaries of the city and royal burgh of Dundee; to alter the Wards for Municipal and other Elections; to authorise the construction of a new Road or Street and new Tramways; and for other purposes. (Repealed by Dundee Corporation (Consolidated Powers) Order Confirmation Act 1957 (6 & 7 Eliz. 2. c. iv))
Newcastle-upon-Tyne Improvement Act 1892	55 & 56 Vict. c. ccxxxvi	28 June 1892
An Act to enable the Mayor Aldermen and Citizens of the City and County of Newcastle-upon-Tyne to construct Street Improvements Tramways and other Works and to make further provision for the good Government of the City and for other purposes.
London County Council (Money) Act 1892 (repealed)	55 & 56 Vict. c. ccxxxvii	28 June 1892
An Act to regulate the expenditure and raising of Money by the London County Council on Capital Account during the current Financial Period. (Repealed by London County Council (Finance Consolidation) Act 1912 (2 & 3 Geo. 5. c. cv))
London County Council (General Powers) Act 1892	55 & 56 Vict. c. ccxxxviii	28 June 1892
An Act to empower the London County Council to make a Street Improvement at Sandy's Row Spitalfields to acquire and manage land for various purposes in the Administrative County of London to extend the time for purchase of land for the Thames Tunnel (Blackwall) and for other purposes.
Glasgow Building Regulations Act 1892 (repealed)	55 & 56 Vict. c. ccxxxix	28 June 1892
An Act to provide Building Regulations for the City of Glasgow and for other purposes. (Repealed by Glasgow Building Regulations Act 1900 (63 & 64 Vict. c. cl))
Newport, Godshill and St. Lawrence Railway Act 1892	55 & 56 Vict. c. ccxl	28 June 1892
An Act to authorise the Newport Godshill and St. Lawrence Railway Company to extend their Railway towards Ventnor and for other purposes.
Central London Railway Act 1892	55 & 56 Vict. c. ccxli	28 June 1892
An Act to confer further powers on the Central London Railway Company and for other purposes.
Great Northern and City Railway Act 1892	55 & 56 Vict. c. ccxlii	28 June 1892
An Act for incorporating the Great Northern and City Railway Company and empowering them to construct a railway from the Canonbury branch of the Great Northern Railway near Finsbury Park to the city of London and for other purposes.

=== Private act ===
Short title	Citation	Royal assent
Long title
Glenmuick Estate Act 1892	55 & 56 Vict. c. 1 Pr.	27 June 1892
An Act to enable the Trustees of the late Sir James Thompson Mackenzie, Baronet, of Glenmuick, to postpone the sale of certain heritable subjects held by them, and for other purposes.

=== Sources ===
- The Public General Statutes, Volume 29: 55 & 56 Victoria – 1892 – via Internet Archive.

== See also ==
- List of acts of the Parliament of the United Kingdom
