= Draperstown railway station =

Railway station in County Londonderry, Northern Ireland

Draperstown

General information
- Location: Draperstown, County Londonderry; Northern Ireland
- Coordinates: 54.7954°N 6.7810°W

Other information
- Status: Disused

History
- Original company: Draperstown Railway
- Pre-grouping: Belfast and Northern Counties Railway
- Post-grouping: Northern Counties Committee

Key dates
- 20 July 1883: Station opens
- 1 October 1930: Station closes to passengers
- 3 July 1950: Station closes
Location

Draperstown railway station was on the Draperstown Railway which ran from Magherafelt to Draperstown in Northern Ireland, United Kingdom.

== History ==
The station was opened by the Draperstown Railway on 20 July 1883. It was taken over by the Belfast and County Down Railway (later the Northern Counties Committee) in July 1895.

The station closed to passengers on 1 October 1930 and closed altogether on 3 July 1950 when the Ulster Transport Authority closed the line entirely.

Preceding station	Historical railways	Following station
Desertmartin	Draperstown Railway; Magherafelt-Draperstown	Terminus
