= Draperstown Railway =

Railway in Northern Ireland

The Draperstown Railway was an Irish gauge (1,600 mm (5 ft 3 in)) in County Londonderry, Northern Ireland.

== History ==
Draperstown Railway Act 1878
- Act of Parliament
- Parliament of the United Kingdom
- Long title: An Act for making certain Railways between the town of Magherafelt, in the county of Londonderry, and Draperstown, in the same county; and for other purposes.
- Citation: 41 & 42 Vict. c. clxxviii

Dates
- Royal assent: 22 July 1878

Text of statute as originally enacted

The line was authorised by the Draperstown Railway Act 1878 (41 & 42 Vict. c. clxxviii) and built between 1881 and 1883, a short single-track branch line 8 miles (13 km) in length, to connect Magherafelt and Draperstown. The engineer was John Lanyon, and the contractors were J & W Grainger.

It was operated by the Belfast and Northern Counties Railway and taken over by them in July 1895 under the Belfast and Northern Counties Railway Act 1895 (58 & 59 Vict. c. civ).

Passenger services were withdrawn in 1930 and the line was finally closed in 1950.

== Stations ==
The following stations were on the route:

- Magherafelt
- Desertmartin
- Draperstown
