= Wellbrook Beetling Mill =

Historic linen mill in Northern Ireland

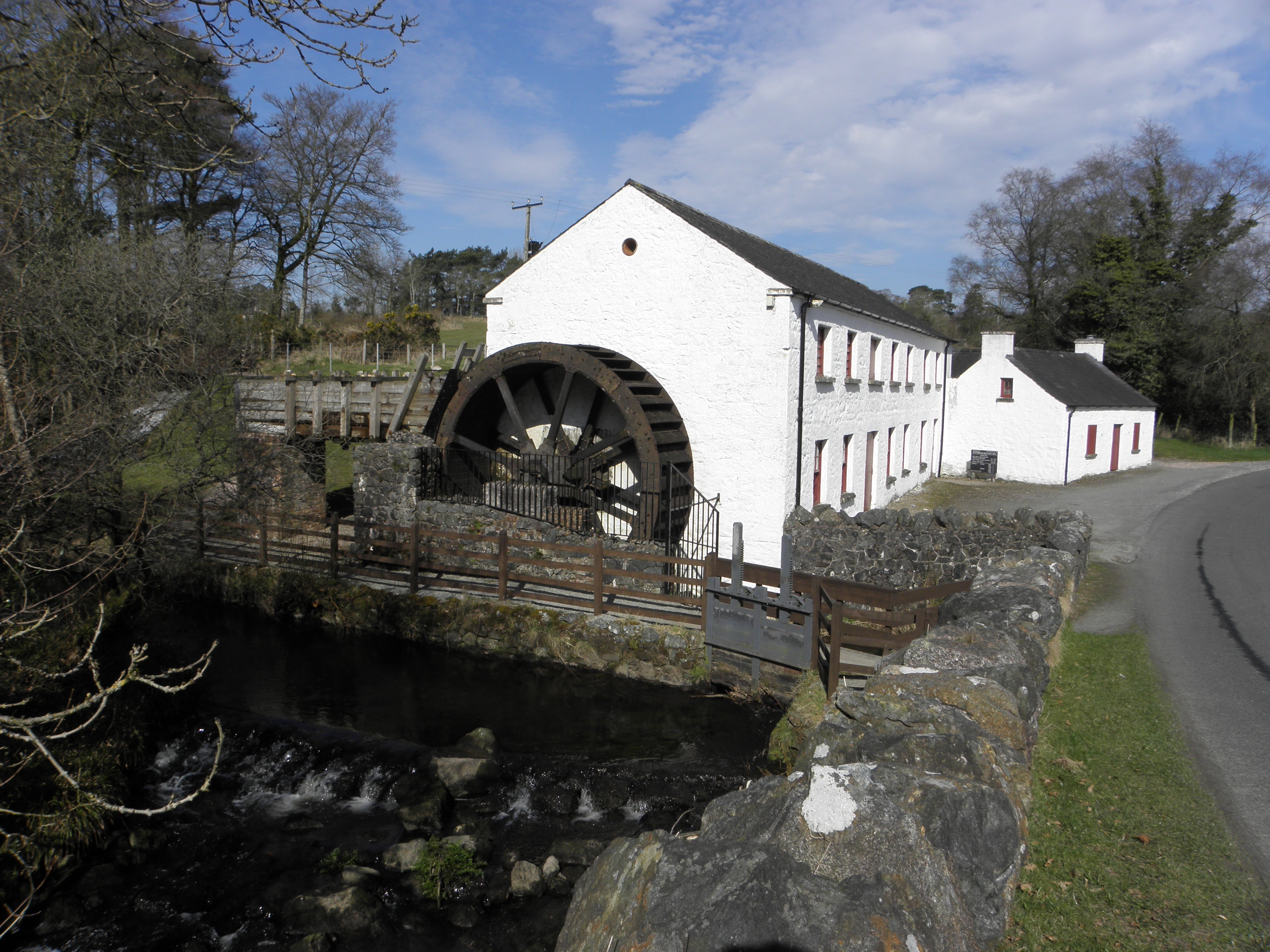
- Wellbrook Beetling Mill, County Tyrone

- Located 4 miles southwest of Cookstown
- Coordinates: 54.6549°N 6.8395°W
- Type: Industrial heritage site
- Founder: Hugh Faulkner
- Owner: National Trust
- Website: Wellbrook Beetling Mill

Wellbrook Beetling Mill is a restored 19th-century water-powered linen finishing mill on the Ballinderry River near Cookstown, County Tyrone, Northern Ireland. Operated by the National Trust, it is the last functioning beetling mill in the United Kingdom and is open to the public on weekends during July and August as part of a guided tour.

== History ==
The site originated as a linen bleaching works in 1764, established by Hugh Faulkner and his brother. In the 1830s, James Irwin acquired the property and redeveloped it into a beetling mill, replacing earlier structures with the buildings that stand today. The Leeper family took ownership in 1864, sourcing linen from local producers such as Gunning and Moore’s Milburn Factory and exporting finished cloth to markets including New Zealand and Australia.

During the First World War, the mill produced linen and flax. Operations declined in the mid-20th century due to the increasing use of synthetic fabrics, and the mill closed in 1961.

In 1967, the site and surrounding land were gifted to the National Trust by local landowner S.J. Henderson. Following restoration, the mill opened to the public on 19 June 1970.

== Features ==
The site includes a 16-foot water wheel and original beetling machinery, which are demonstrated during guided tours. A traditional mill worker's cottage stands on the site, and woodland paths run through the grounds.

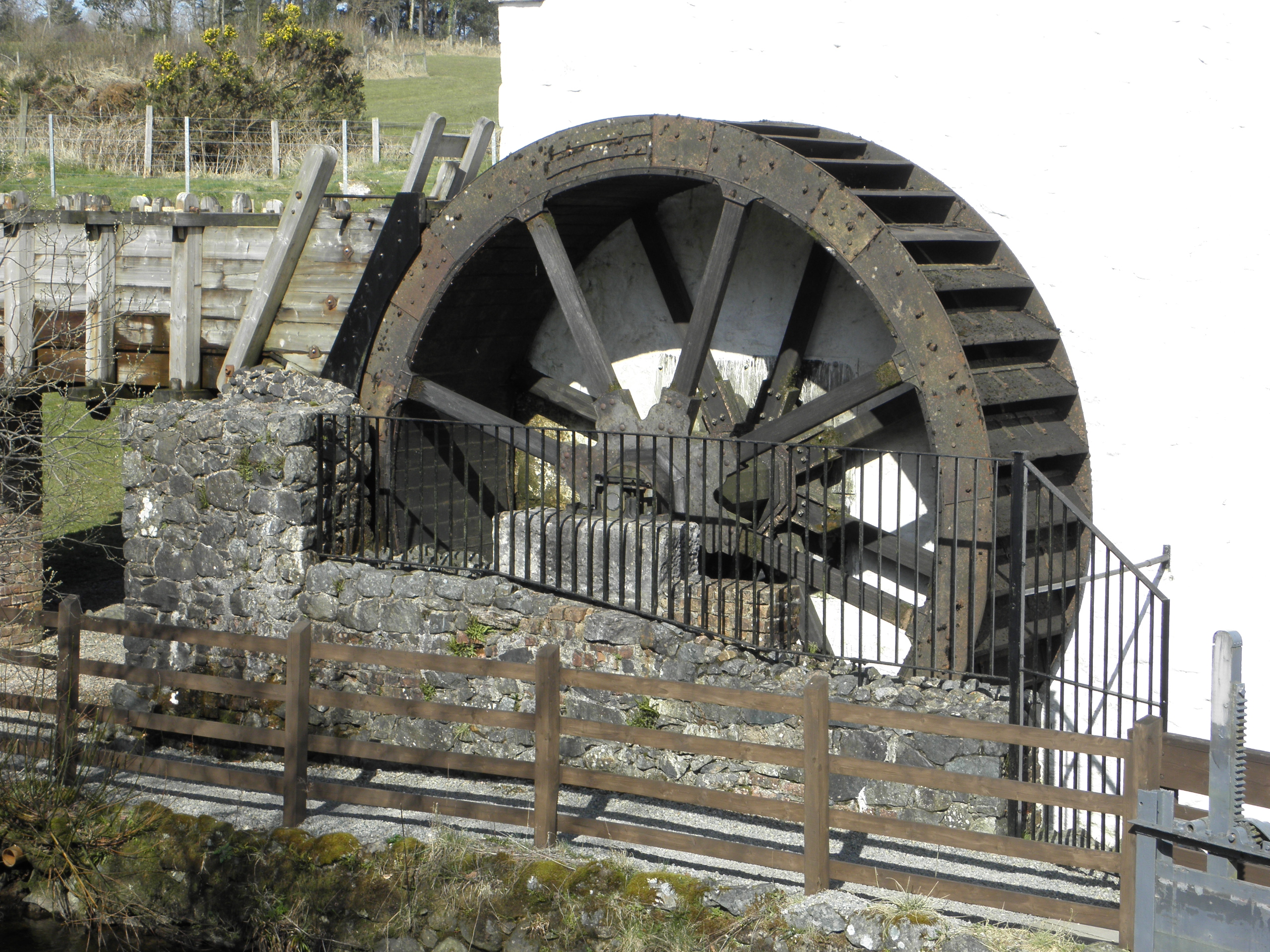
The 16-foot water wheel at Wellbrook Beetling Mill, restored and operational.

== Significance ==
The mill is among the surviving beetling mills in Northern Ireland and remains the only publicly accessible example in the United Kingdom.

== See also ==
- Water wheel
- Industrial archaeology
- Flax Mill
- Textile Finishing
- Irish linen
- Linen
- Beetling
