= Patterson's Spade Mill =

Folk museum in Northern Ireland

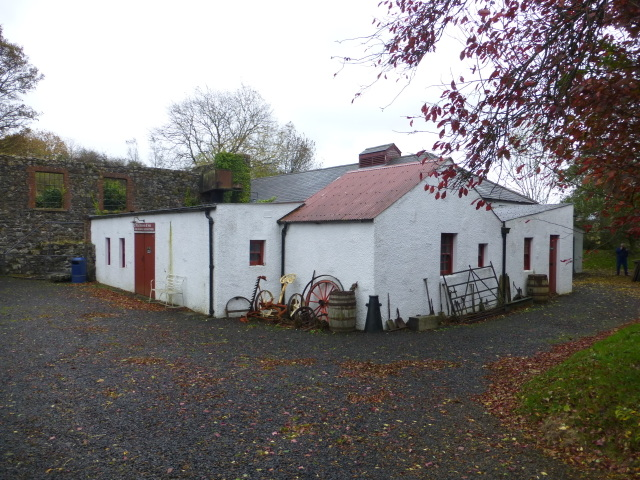
- Location: Templepatrick, County Antrim
- Coordinates: 54.70°N 6.04°W
- Type: Industrial heritage museum
- Website: https://www.nationaltrust.org.uk/pattersons-spade-mill

Patterson's Spade Mill is a water-powered spade mill in Templepatrick, County Antrim, Northern Ireland. Initially a flax and corn mill, it was later converted to a paper mill. Ownership passed to the Patterson family, who had been involved in the spade industry for several generations, converting the mill once again.

The mill was purchased by the National Trust in 1992. It is the last spade mill in operation in situ in the British Isles.

== History ==
There has a been a mill on the site of Patterson's Spade Mill since at least 1770. First used as a flax and corn mill until 1837, it was subsequently converted to use as a paper mill by Robert Sloane, initially employing nineteen people. Sloan's son, William, took over the paper mill, but by 1864 it had been transferred to a company called Diamond & Steen. By 1877 the mill had changed hands again to the Carnanee Paper Mills Company. In the 1880s it was owned by the Ballyclare Paper Mills Company, but by 1891 machinery had been removed and the site was dilapidated.

By 1901 the Moorefield Dyeing and Finishing Company had purchased the former paper mill and converted it to use as a beetling mill for linen. It then became known as Carnanee Beetling Mill. In 1919-1920 the mill once again underwent conversion, this time to facilitate spade production, under the ownership of the Patterson family. Initially called Carnanee Spade Mill, the name changed to Patterson's Spade Mill in the 1950s.

The first record of the Patterson family making spades was made in 1781 in Ballyronan, County Londonderry. When William George Patterson became first owner of the mill c.1920, he was at least the fourth generation of his family to work in the spade-making industry. The family had been previously connected to other spade mills, such as the one at Bushmills distillery. William George died in 1929 and his sons John, Ben, Robert and Fred continued to work in the mill. The spade mill's busiest period was during the 1930s and 1940s.

Commonly in the spade industry, eldest sons inherited the business, and it was John's sons Arnold, Jim, Jack, George and Robert who continued the work. Arnold ultimately went to work at the spade mill at Ulster Folk Museum, while Jack and Robert continued the trade at Patterson's.

In 1990, the last member of the family to make spades at the mill, Robert Patterson, died, and the family decided to sell the property and business.

== Buildings ==
The earliest map of the site from 1770 shows a building connected to the Ballymartin Water by the head race and tail race of what became the early mill. It also shows two further buildings, which may have been early iterations a mill-owners house and workers' cottages. By 1832 there were five buildings on site, including a second building, likely a mill, that was also connected to the head race. The flax mill was powered by a 14 by 4 ft (4.3 by 1.2 m) waterwheel and the corn mill by a waterwheel that measured 10 by 4 ft (3.0 by 1.2 m). Two roads had also been constructed to enable access to the site; one of these connected to a major turnpike.

During the 1837 conversion to the paper-mill, the corn kiln and kiln store were both demolished. The two-storey former corn mill building was extended to form a rag store and engine room. A new machine room was built next to the extended corn mill. The head race and tail race were also altered: the tail race extended so it discharged further down the Ballymartin Water; the head race had its pond expanded in order to power the much larger waterwheels that are recorded in 1862. During the tail race expansion, the mill manager's house was demolished and re-built. The engine room of the paper mill (the formerly extended corn mill) was subsequently converted to work as a beetling mill by 1921.

The head race was also altered from 1974-75 when the M2 motorway section between Sandyknowes and Templepatrick was built. The mill has protected status as a listed building.

== Manufacture ==
The mill is powered by a Leffel Double Turbine Waterwheel Turbine, which was installed by William George Patterson in 1920. It powers a tilt hammer, which is used to shape the blade of a spade. Spade-making with forged heads, such as the ones made at Patterson's, is listed as critically endangered by Heritage Crafts, the advocacy body for traditional crafts and industries in the UK. There are over 150 types of Irish spade, with iron-tipped spades being closely connected to the paludal or maritime regions of Ulster. As of 2003, the mill specialised in making turf and garden spades. A Patterson's spade is owned by television presenter Paul Martin, who has used it during his appearances on Countryfile.

The mill itself has several separate areas of work: an area where the furnace and tilt hammer heat and forge the blades of the spades; another area for finishing, which includes the manufacture of shafts and handles from wood, fitting the blades to the shafts, as well as painting and labelling the spades.

== Preservation and restoration ==
After the mill was put up for sale by the Patterson family, there was clear recognition by the Historic Monuments and Buildings Branch of the Department of the Environment (predecessor of the Historic Environment Division of the Department for Communities), that the site and its processes needed to be recorded and preferably preserved. It was further hoped that an owner could be found who would preserve the historic nature of the site, since it was the last-surviving water-powered spade mill operational in situ in the British Isles.

The property was preserved by the National Trust, who purchased the property in 1992, not just to preserve the physical buildings but to also maintain the tradition of spade forging in Ulster. From 1993-94 buildings were repaired and the water turbine restored. The National Trust also commissioned Jack Crabtree to paint and draw scenes from the mill prior to restoration. Works produced as part of this series are held in the collection of the Ulster Museum, as well as in the National Trust's collections.

== Visitor attraction ==
The mill opened to the public in 1994. Since then several buildings have been restored and interpretative materials have been developed to introduce visitors to the cultural and historical importance of spade production. New spades continue to be forged on site. There is also a display of the many varieties of Irish spade.

In 2008 the museum revived the tradition of a marriage ceremony 'Over the Anvil', welcoming its first couple for their wedding. In 2010 composer Willie Drennan created traditional Irish music inspired by the site.

== Gallery ==
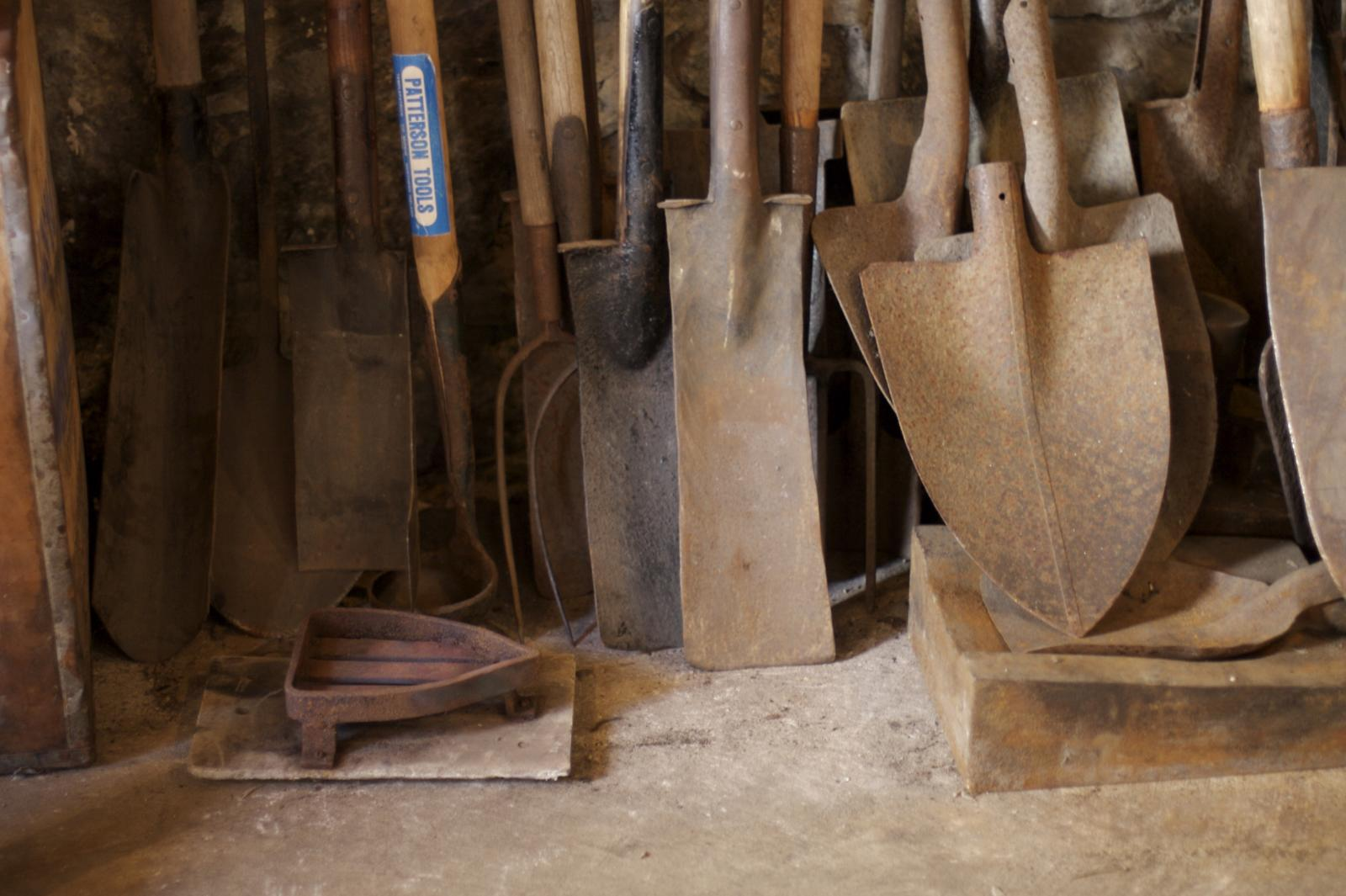
Varieties of spade

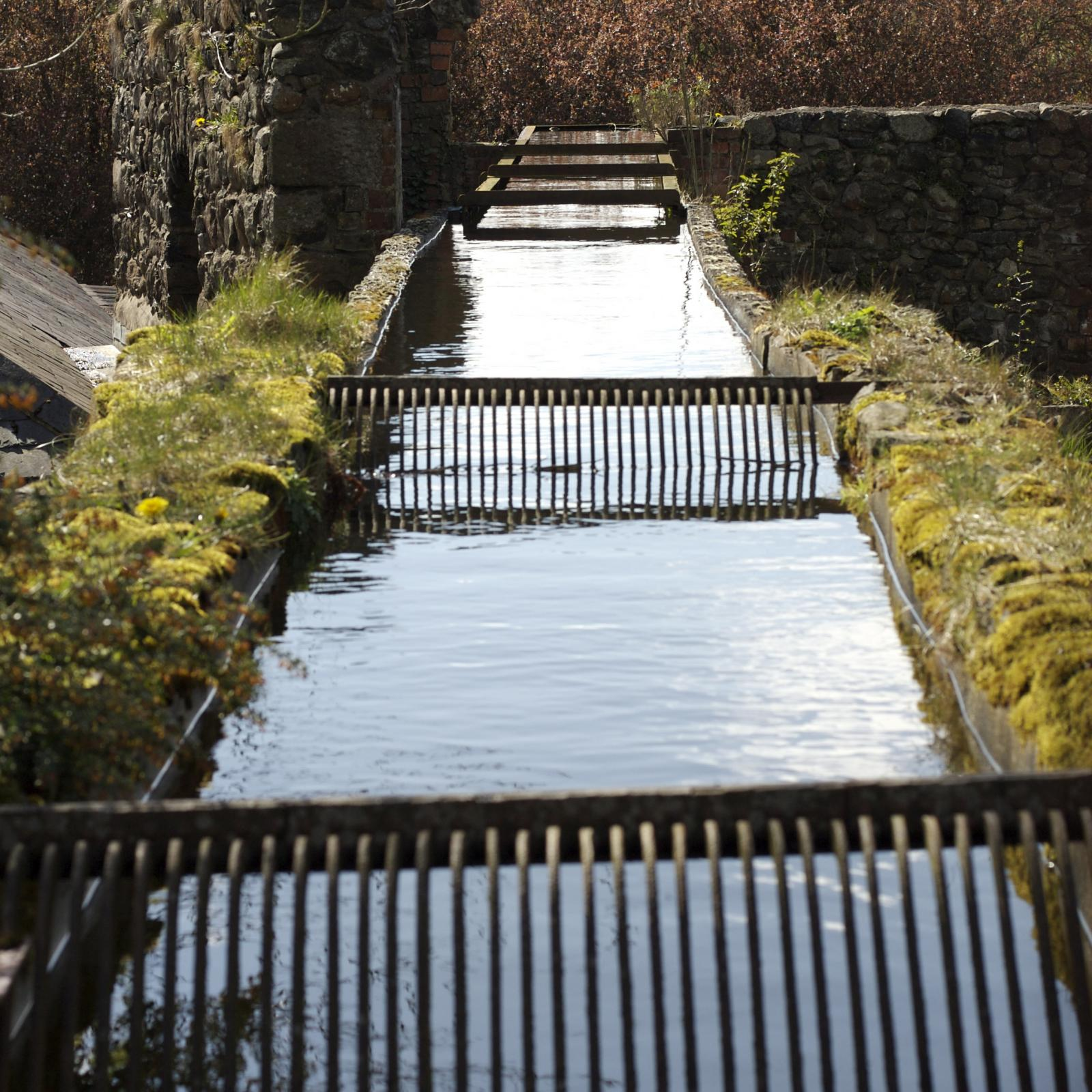
Head race

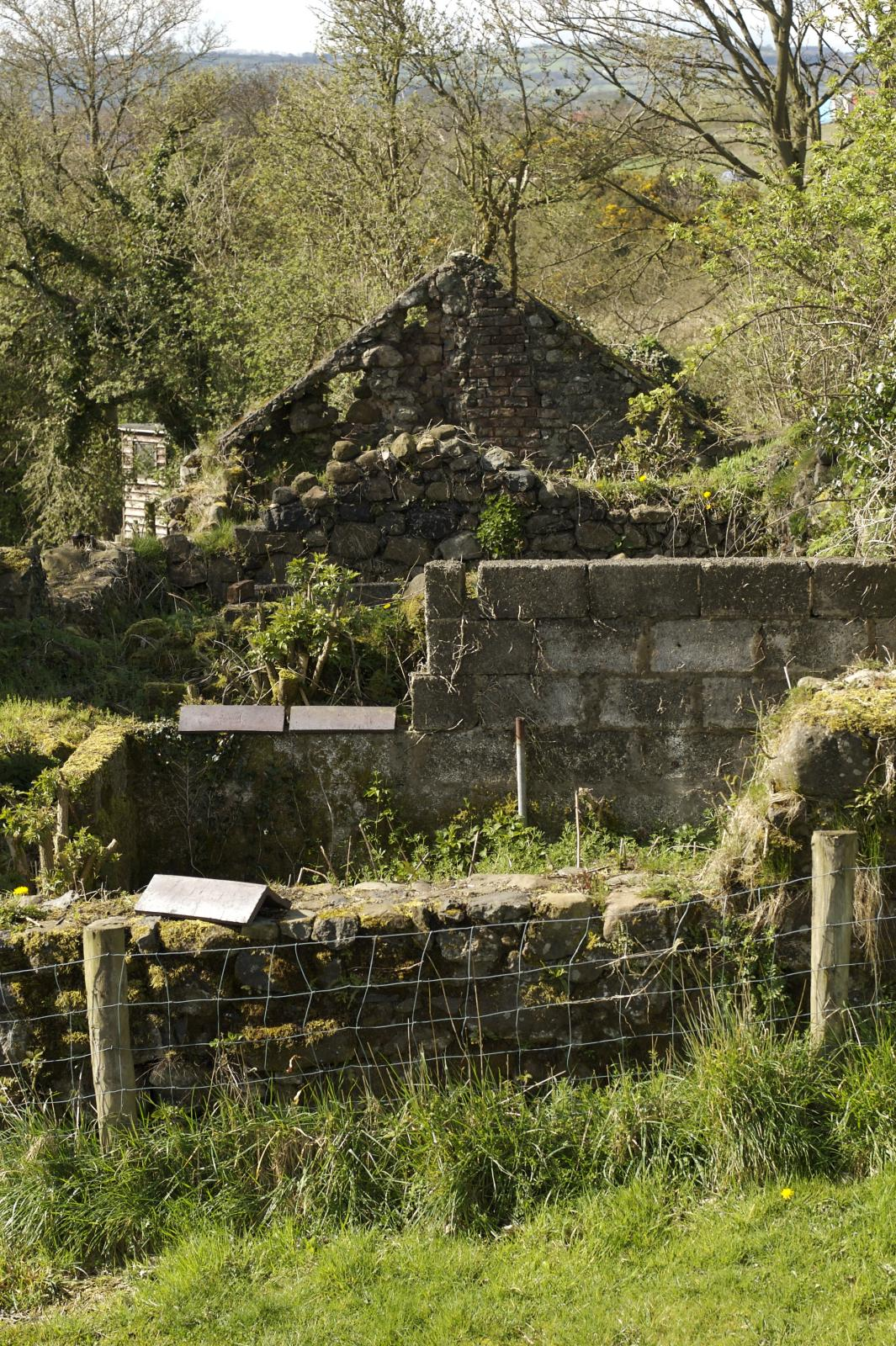
Ruined cottages

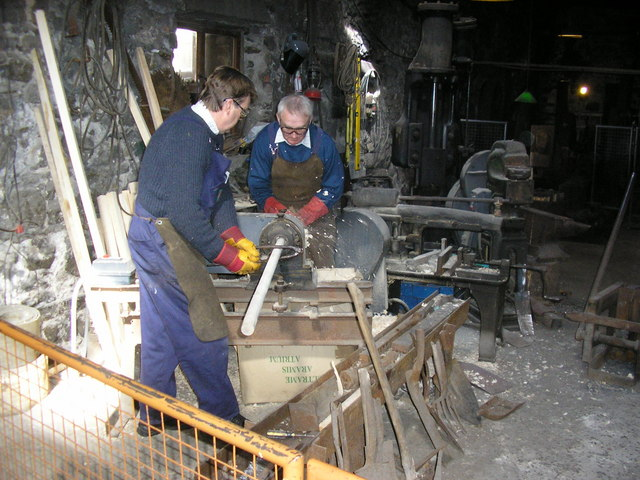
Shaping a shovel handle

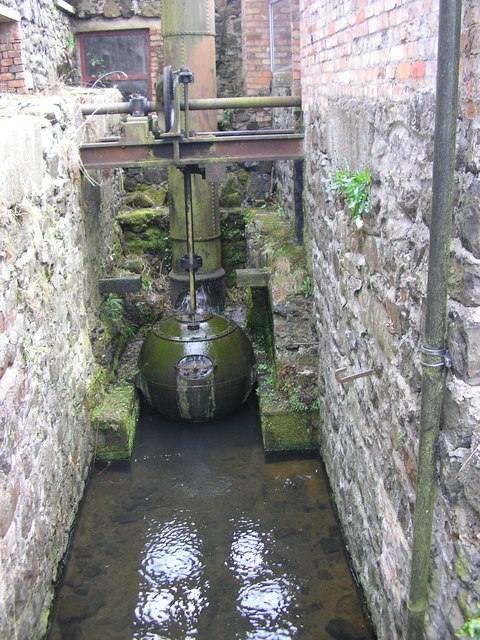
Turbine
