= Jack Crabtree =

Jack Crabtree may refer to:

- Jack Crabtree (American football) (1935–2026), American college football player
- Jack Crabtree (artist) (1938–2026), English figurative painter and teacher
