= Killymoon Castle =

Ruined castle in County Tyrone, Northern Ireland

Coordinates: 54.635°N 6.736°W

Killymoon Castle is a castle situated about one mile (1.6 km) south east of Cookstown, County Tyrone, Northern Ireland, on the north bank of the Ballinderry River.

It is located above the Ballinderry River with a back-drop of woodland and parkland. The garden front is dominated by an almost central battlemented, machicolated round tower and turret that protrudes from the facade. At one end is an octagonal tower with similar features; and at the other end (the front) is the square tower in the base of which is arched to accommodate a porte-cochére. This tower also has slender, octagonal clasping buttresses with cupolas. The windows are pointed, grouped together under segmental hood mouldings.

An 18-hole golf course was built on the parkland, where British tournaments have been played.

== History ==
The original Killymoon Castle, which was built in 1671, burnt down in 1801. It was rebuilt in a larger version in 1803 to a design by John Nash. It is an asymmetrical structure with both round and square towers and Regency Gothic interiors.

== See also ==
- Castles in Northern Ireland
