= Maghery Country Park =

Park in the United Kingdom

Coordinates: 54.516°N 6.583°W

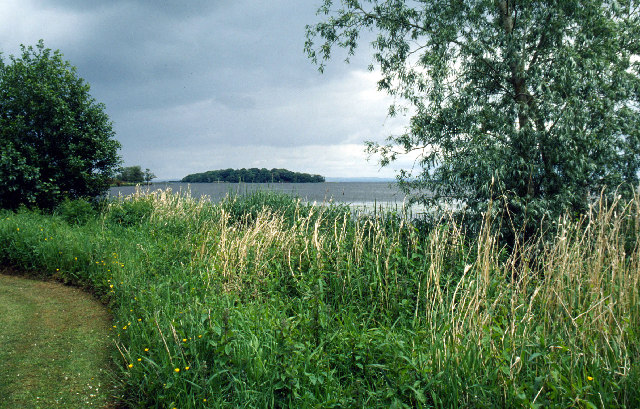
Maghery Country Park, 2004

Maghery Country Park is a park in the village of Maghery, County Armagh, Northern Ireland, on the shores of Lough Neagh. It covers 30 acres (120,000 m^{2}) and includes five km of woodland walks and picnic areas and is used for birdwatching, fishing, and walking. Coney Island lies one km off shore and boat trips are available from the park at weekends. It is an important local amenity and tourist attraction and is managed by Armagh City, Banbridge and Craigavon Borough Council.

== Facilities ==
The park is on the River Blackwater and Lough Neagh Canoe Trails, and there are jetties and a slipway. There is also a play area and an open multi-use games area. The park has toilets and parking, including accessible parking.

== History ==
Maghery Country Park is a park in the village of Maghery, County Armagh, Northern Ireland, on the shores of Lough Neagh. It covers 30 acres (120,000 m^{2}) and includes five km of woodland walks and picnic areas and is used for birdwatching, fishing, and walking. Coney Island lies one km off shore and boat trips are available from the park at weekends. There is a picnic area, trails around the island, and a resident warden. The Country Park It is an important local amenity and tourist attraction and is managed by Armagh City, Banbridge and Craigavon Borough Council.

== Wildlife ==
The Irish Wetland Bird Survey (I-WeBS), conducted by BirdWatch Ireland and the National Parks and Wildlife Service, report decreasing numbers of wigeon and mute swans on the lake.
