= The Troubles in Moneymore =

Incidents in Moneymore, Northern Ireland during the Troubles

A total of seven people were killed in Troubles-related violence in or near the County Londonderry village of Moneymore, of whom six were Protestant and one Catholic. All were killed by the Irish Republican Army (IRA) except 71-year-old Protestant Samuel Miller, who was beaten to death by the Ulster Defence Association after witnessing a robbery.

Of the IRA's six victims, three were members of the Royal Ulster Constabulary (RUC) and one was a soldier in the Royal Irish Regiment. The IRA's two civilian victims were a Catholic farmer inadvertently killed by a booby trap bomb on his farm, and a contractor, Harry Henry, for the British Army and RUC who was shot at his home in The Loup. Henry was a Protestant businessman who had set up a building company with his brother which prospered by supplying bomb-proof windows and repairing damaged security bases around Northern Ireland.

All were killed in separate incidents except for two of the RUC officers, who were shot by IRA gunmen after a car chase. Francis Hughes' involvement in the killings was confirmed in an IRA account of the incident.
