= Coney Island, Lough Neagh =

Island in Lough Neagh, Northern Ireland

Coordinates: 54.517°N 6.551°W

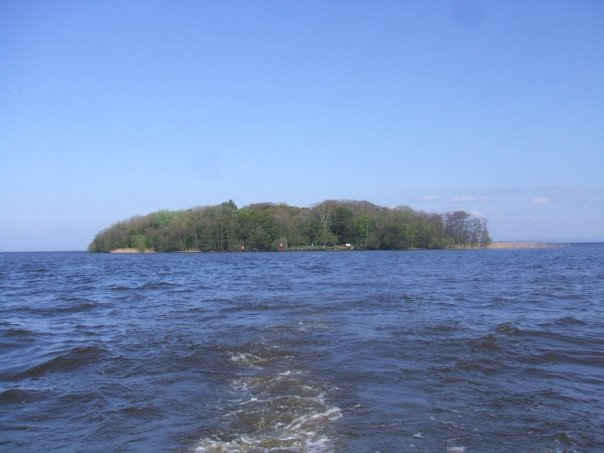
Coney Island, Taken from the back of Trostan on the crossing to Maghery country park

Coney Island is an island in Lough Neagh, Northern Ireland. It is about 1 km offshore from Maghery in County Armagh, is thickly wooded and of nearly 9 acres (36,000 m^{2}) in area. It lies between the mouths of the River Blackwater and the River Bann in the south-west corner of Lough Neagh.

Boat trips to the island are available at weekends from Maghery Country Park or Kinnego Marina. The island is owned by the National Trust and managed on their behalf by Armagh City, Banbridge and Craigavon Borough Council. Coney Island Flat is a rocky outcrop adjacent to the island. Although Samuel Lewis called Coney Island the only island in County Armagh, Armagh's section of Lough Neagh also includes Croaghan Island, as well as the marginal cases of Padian and Derrywarragh Island.

== Name ==
The original Irish name of the island was Inis Dabhaill, "island of the Blackwater", so named because it lies opposite where the river Blackwater enters Lough Neagh. In English it was called Enish Douel and then Sidney's Island. The current name comes from coney, meaning "rabbit".

The Coney Island mentioned in the iconic song by Van Morrison is not the one in Lough Neagh but is land-tied to the south-east coast of Northern Ireland, on the road from Ardglass to Killough, in the hamlet with the same name and the Coney Island road leading towards it.

== History ==
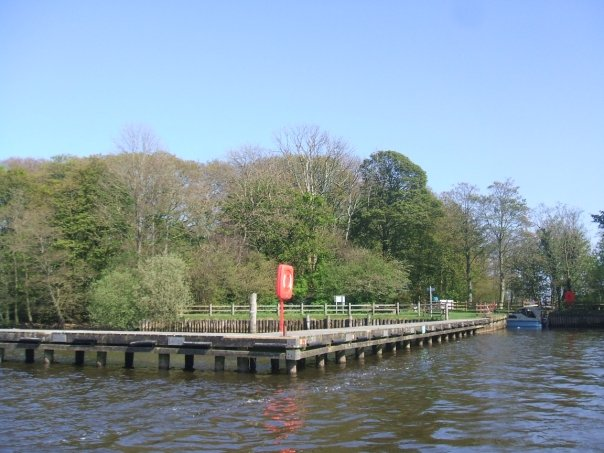
Approaching Coney Island

Coney Island has a rich history with long evidence of human occupation. This causeway was breached in the 19th century to allow the passage of barges from the Bann to the Blackwater.

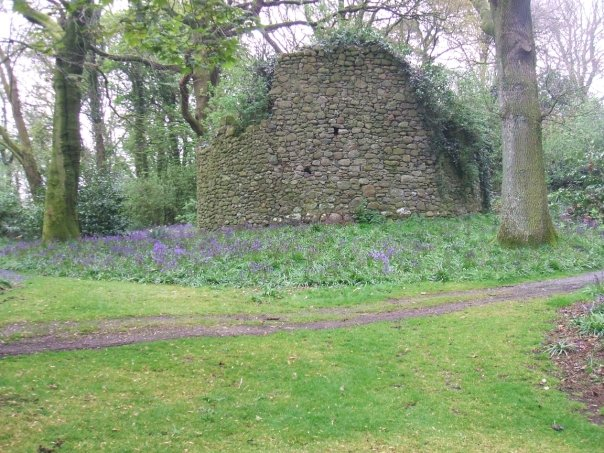
Norman Round Tower, Coney Island, Lough Neagh

It features a 13th-century Anglo-Norman motte.

A native settlement flourished there in the later Middle Ages when there was also a small iron industry. Subsequently, the island was refortified with a bank, ditch and an external palisade.

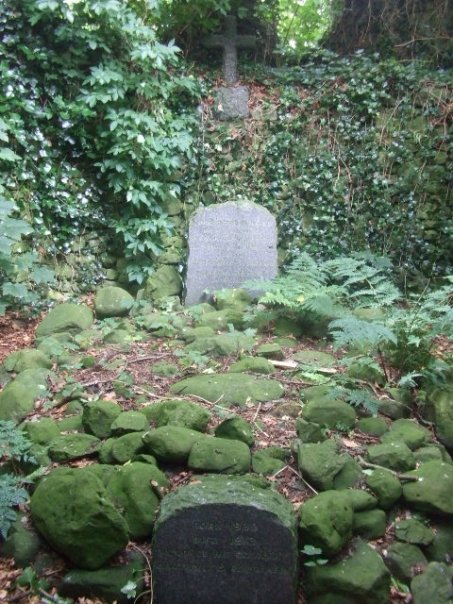
Grave in the Norman Round Tower on Coney Island

It also has a 16th-century stone tower. The island was one of the O'Neill's major strongholds, but was delivered to Lord Deputy Sir Henry Sydney in 1567, and appears to have continued in use as a fort for a generation at least. At some later point the defences were thoroughly razed. In the 17th and 18th centuries the island was only sporadically occupied.

In the 1890s, Coney Island was bought by James Caulfeild, 7th Viscount Charlemont (1830–1913), supposedly for £150. He lived in Drumcairne, just outside Stewartstown, and having bought the island, he built a summer house there in 1895. In 1946, the island was given to the National Trust by Fred Storey.

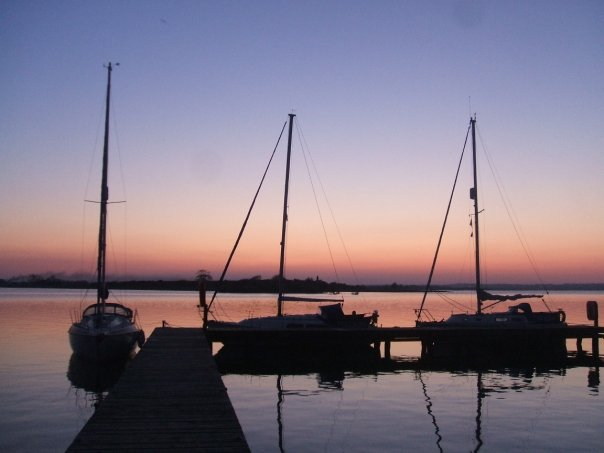
Sailing boats in for the night, Coney Island, Lough Neagh
