= Cookstown =

Town in County Tyrone, Northern Ireland

Coordinates: 54.647°N 6.745°W

Cookstown: Irish: An Chorr Chríochach; Scots: Cookestoun or Cookstoon
- Town
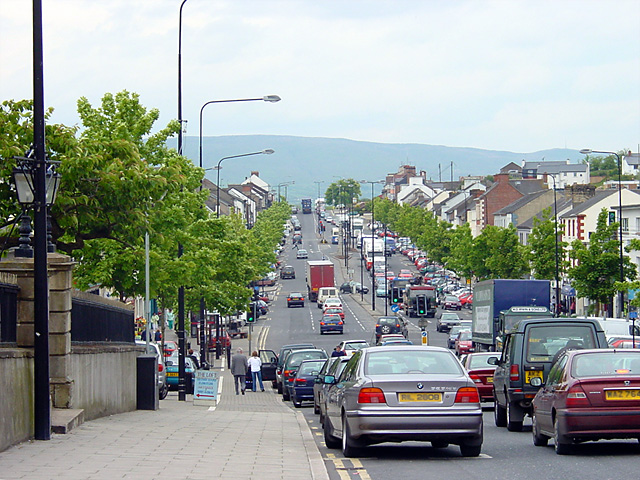
- The main street, looking north, with Slieve Gallion in the background

- Coat of Arms

- Location within Northern Ireland
- Population: 12,546 (2021 Census)
- Irish grid reference: H8178
  - Belfast: 47 miles
- District: Mid Ulster
- County: County Tyrone
- Country: Northern Ireland
- Sovereign state: United Kingdom
- Post town: COOKSTOWN
- Postcode district: BT80
- Dialling code: 028
- Police: Northern Ireland
- Fire: Northern Ireland
- Ambulance: Northern Ireland
- UK Parliament: Mid Ulster
- NI Assembly: Mid Ulster

Cookstown is a market town in County Tyrone, Northern Ireland. It is the fourth-largest town in the county, with a population of 12,546 in the 2021 census. It, along with Magherafelt and Dungannon, is one of the main towns in the local government district of Mid Ulster. It was founded in the early 17th century by English colonist and ecclesiastical lawyer, Dr. Alan Cooke, during the Plantation of Ulster. The town was rebuilt in the late 18th century by the Stewart family. It was one of the main centres of the linen industry west of the River Bann, and until 1956, flax spinning, weaving, bleaching and beetling were carried out in the town. Cookstown is said to have the longest main street in Ireland, running in a straight line for 1.25 miles (2 km).

== History ==
The town was founded in the early 17th century, during the Plantation of Ulster. In 1609, land confiscated from the native Irish was leased to English colonist and ecclesiastical lawyer Allan Cooke. He fulfilled the covenants entered in the lease by building houses in the townland of Corcrigagh or Corchrichy, from Irish a' Corr Críochach or an Chorr Chríochach, "the boundary hill". In 1628, Charles I granted Letters Patent to Cooke permitting the holding of a twice-weekly market for livestock and flaxen goods.

In the Irish rebellion of 1641, the native Irish revolted against the colonists in a bloody rebellion and the town was destroyed. The rebellion had a devastating effect on the town and development ceased for nearly a century. Over the succeeding years, the lands around Cookstown were progressively bought up by William Stewart of Killymoon until in 1671 all of Dr Cooke's lands were in the hands of the Stewart family. William Stewart and later his son James set out plans for the town soon after this. Inspired by the Wide Streets Commission's work in Dublin, they planned a new town to be built along a tree lined boulevard which was to be 135 feet (41 m) wide.

In 1802, Colonel William Stewart (James Stewart's unmarried son) approached the London architect, John Nash, and requested that he visit the area to rebuild Killymoon Castle. Nash also designed the Rectory at Lissan for the Rev John Molesworth Staples in 1807.

With the establishment of Gunning's Linen Weaving Mill, with over 300 looms, Cookstown developed in the 19th century as the local centre of the linen trade. Two railways established terminus railway stations at Cookstown - the Belfast and Northern Counties Railway (1856-1955) and the Great Northern Railway (1879-1959).

Prominent developments in the second half of the 19th century included J.J. McCarthy's Church of the Holy Trinity on Chapel Street.

On 17 June 1920, during the Irish War of Independence, the Irish Republican Army (IRA) raided the Royal Irish Constabulary (RIC) barracks in Cookstown, with help from four sympathetic RIC officers. In a brief firefight, IRA member Patrick Loughran was killed. He was the first IRA man killed on active service in what became Northern Ireland.

Cookstown Town Hall was designed by the town surveyor, Charles Geoffrey Birtwell, and built on the Burn Road by James Corrigan of Pomeroy: it was officially opened on 27 May 1953.

During the Troubles, Cookstown suffered from several bomb attacks: on 2 November 1990 an off duty soldier from the Ulster Defence Regiment was killed by a car bomb.

Cookstown Town Hall was demolished in 1998 and the Burnavon Arts and Cultural Centre opened on the site in 2000.

On 17 March 2019, three teenagers were killed in a crowd crush outside the Greenvale Hotel in Cookstown during a St Patrick's Day disco.

== Places of interest ==
- Ardboe High Cross and Abbey (Seanchrois Ard Bó agus Ministir Naomh Colmán), one of the best examples of a 9th/10th century High cross in Ireland, is 10 mi (16 km) from Cookstown. It forms the only remaining part of an early monastery on the site.
- Other ancient sites nearby include Beaghmore stone circles and Tullyhogue Fort (beside the village of Tullyhogue), the inauguration site of the chiefs of Tyrone (Tir Eogain), the O'Neills.
- The Donaghrisk walled cemetery to the southwest of (and clearly visible from) the fort is the resting place of the O'Hagans, the chief justices of Tyrone (and as such, they presided over the inauguration ceremonies of the O'Neills).
- Lissan House lies on the outskirts of Cookstown. It is a large structure which was the home of the Staples family for 350 years.
- Killymoon Castle is about 1 mi (1.6 km) south east of Cookstown. It was built in just over a year at a cost of £80,000 and was Nash's first Irish commission.

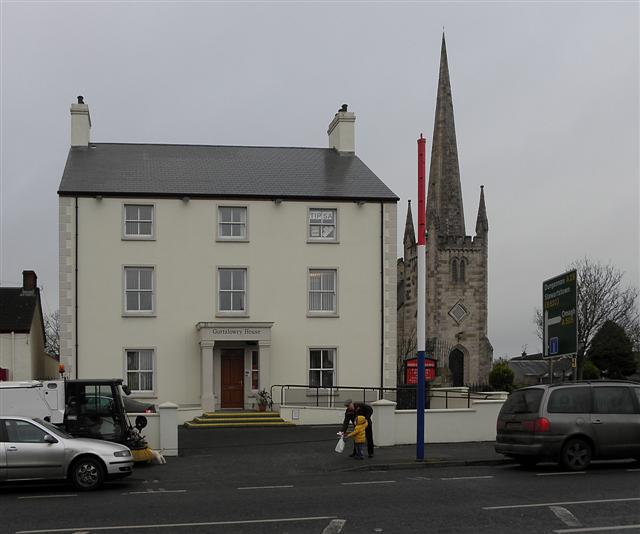
Gortalowry House

- Drum Manor, approximately 5 mi (8 km) from the town. Alexander Richardson, a burgess from Edinburgh, Scotland, bought the estate of Craigbalk in 1617 and built Drum Manor, originally known Manor Richardson. Alexander's son Sir William Richardson left it to his second son, Alexander, from which the Richardsons of Drum descend. Sir William's third son, William, who inherited lands near Augher, obtained a lease for lands in the townland of Tullyreavy on the Drum Manor estate, where he built a house by the lake known as Oaklands.

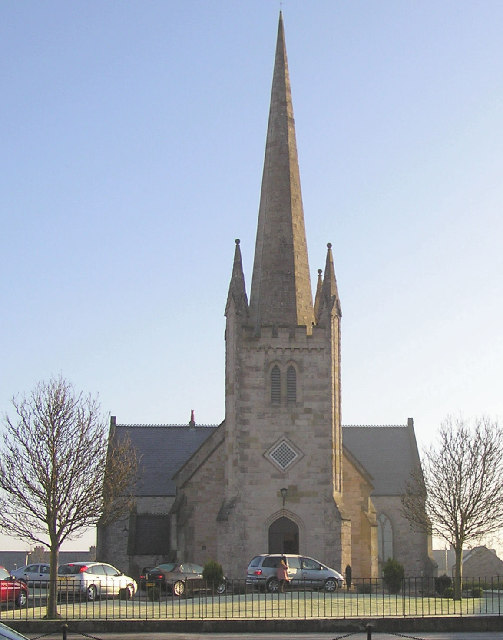
St Luaran's Church

- St Luaran's Church of Ireland church is on Church Street.

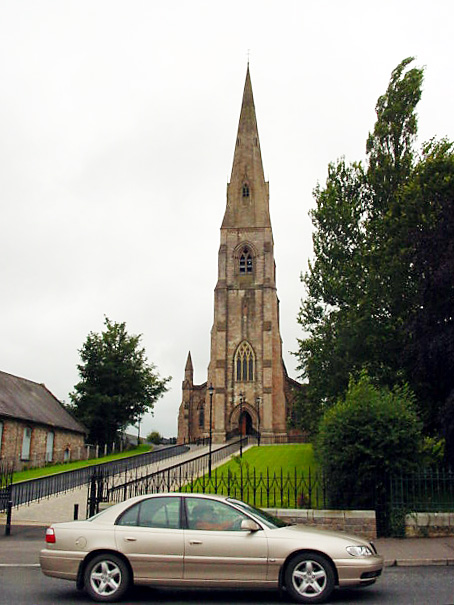
Church of the Holy Trinity

- James Joseph McCarthy's Catholic church, dedicated to the Holy Trinity, was constructed between 1855 and 1860 with a tower and spire at the east end.
- Derryloran Old Cemetery is a historic site of interest, located on the Sandholes Road on the outskirts of the town, which features an old graveyard and churchyard dating back to the 17th Century.
- Wellbrook Beetling Mill, located 4 mi (6.4 km) southwest of Cookstown, is the last working water-powered beetling mill in Northern Ireland.

== Demography ==
=== 19th century population ===
The population of the town increased during the 19th century:

| Year | 1841 | 1851 | 1861 | 1871 | 1881 | 1891 |
|---|---|---|---|---|---|---|
| Population | 3006 | 2993 | 3257 | 3501 | 3870 | 3841 |
| Houses | 550 | 576 | 600 | 728 | 822 | 835 |

Cookstown is classified as a medium town (i.e. with population between 10,000 and 18,000 people) by the Northern Ireland Statistics and Research Agency (NISRA).

=== 2021 Census ===
National Identity of Cookstown residents (2021)
| Nationality | Per cent |
| British | 31.7% |
| Irish | 31.3% |
| Northern Irish | 28.6% |

On census day in 2021 there were 12,546 people living in Cookstown. Of these:

- 21.05% were aged under 16, 63.93% were aged between 16 and 65, and 15.03% were aged 66 and over.
- 51% were female, and 49% were male.
- 56.21% (7,053) were from a Catholic background, and 34.34% (4,308) were from a Protestant or other Christian background, 1.12% were from other religious backgrounds and 8.33% (1,045) had no religious background.
- 31.68% indicated they had a British national identity, 31.29% had an Irish national identity, and 28.58% had a Northern Irish national identity. (respondents could select more than one national identity).
- 14.55% had some knowledge of Irish, and 8.88% had some knowledge of Ulster-Scots.

=== 2011 Census ===
On census day (27 March 2011) there were 11,599 people living in Cookstown. Of these:

- 98% were from the white ethnic group
- 56% were from a Catholic background, and 39% were from a Protestant or other Christian background
- 40% indicated that they had a British national identity, 30% had a Northern Irish national identity, and 28% had an Irish national identity (respondents could choose more than one)

=== 2001 Census ===
On census day (29 April 2001) there were 10,646 people living in Cookstown. Of these:

- 26.0% were aged under 16 years and 15.6% were aged 60 and over
- 49.7% of the population were male and 50.3% were female
- 52.8% were from a Catholic background and 45.1% were from a Protestant background
- 3.9% of people aged 16–74 were unemployed.

== Townlands ==
The following is a list of townlands within Cookstown's urban area, alongside their likely etymologies:

- Clare (from Clár meaning "level land")
- Cookstown (an English name, from colonist Alan Cooke)
- Coolkeeghan (from Cúil Caocháin meaning "Keighen's corner")
- Coolnafranky (from Cúil na Francaigh meaning "corner of the rats" or "French")
- Coolnahavil (from Cúil na hAbhaill meaning "corner of the orchard")
- Coolreaghs (from Cúil Riach meaning "grey corner")
- Gortalowry (possibly from Gort an Leamhraigh meaning "field of the elm place")
- Loy (from Láigh meaning "hill")
- Maloon (from Maigh Luan meaning "Luan's plain or plain of the lambs")
- Monrush (possibly from Móin Rois meaning "bog of the wood" or Magh Rois, "plain of the wood")
- Sullenboy (from Sailean Buí meaning "yellow willows")
- Tullagh (from Tulach meaning "hilltop")

Cookstown townland itself is situated in the historic barony of Dungannon Upper and the civil parish of Derryloran and covers an area of 217 acres.

The population of the townland increased overall during the 19th century:

| Year | 1841 | 1851 | 1861 | 1871 | 1881 | 1891 |
|---|---|---|---|---|---|---|
| Population | 27 | - | 16 | 123 | 119 | 93 |
| Houses | 5 | 1 | 4 | 23 | 28 | 22 |

== Politics ==
In elections for the Westminster Parliament and the Northern Ireland Assembly it is part of the Mid Ulster constituency.

Cookstown District Council, was established in 1973, and included part of County Londonderry, notably the villages of Moneymore, The Loup and Ballyronan.

As part of the Local Government Reform (NI) Cookstown District Council merged with Dungannon and South Tyrone Borough Council and Magherafelt District Council to form a larger Mid Ulster District Council in 2015.

== Sport ==
=== Motorcycling ===
The town plays host to the Cookstown 100 Road Races, the longest running motorcycle road race in Ireland. Held in April of each year the races are seen as the curtain raiser to the Irish National Road Racing Championship.

=== Gaelic Football ===
Cookstown Fr. Rock's, the local Gaelic Athletic Association club, won the All-Ireland Intermediate Club Football Championship in 2013.

=== Association Football ===
Local association football clubs include Cookstown Olympic F.C. (an intermediate-level football club), Mid-Ulster Ladies F.C. (a women's football club), Killymoon Rangers F.C., Coagh United F.C. and Sofia Farmer F.C. (clubs in the Cookstown District that play in the Ballymena & Provincial Intermediate League).

=== Hockey ===
Cookstown Hockey Club is the town's field hockey team.

== Education ==
Secondary schools serving the area include Cookstown High School and Holy Trinity College, Cookstown.

At third level, the Loughry Campus of the College of Agriculture, Food and Rural Enterprise is 2 mi (3.2 km) south of Cookstown. South West College (a technical college) is also in the area.

== Healthcare ==
The first community hub for primary care in the province is to be established in the town, backed by four local GP practices and the health board. It is to incorporate scanning facilities, a minor surgery suite, a pharmacy, out-of-hours consultations and community healthcare partnerships, with the possibility of developing supported living accommodation for older people.

== Climate ==
Climate data for Lough Fea, Elevation: 225 m (738 ft), 1991–2020 normals
| Month | Jan | Feb | Mar | Apr | May | Jun | Jul | Aug | Sep | Oct | Nov | Dec | Year |
|---|---|---|---|---|---|---|---|---|---|---|---|---|---|
| Mean daily maximum °C (°F) | 6.0 (42.8) | 6.5 (43.7) | 8.3 (46.9) | 10.9 (51.6) | 13.9 (57.0) | 16.2 (61.2) | 17.6 (63.7) | 17.2 (63.0) | 15.2 (59.4) | 11.6 (52.9) | 8.4 (47.1) | 6.3 (43.3) | 11.5 (52.7) |
| Daily mean °C (°F) | 3.6 (38.5) | 3.8 (38.8) | 5.1 (41.2) | 7.3 (45.1) | 10.0 (50.0) | 12.5 (54.5) | 14.1 (57.4) | 13.9 (57.0) | 12.0 (53.6) | 8.9 (48.0) | 5.9 (42.6) | 3.9 (39.0) | 8.4 (47.1) |
| Mean daily minimum °C (°F) | 1.1 (34.0) | 1.1 (34.0) | 2.0 (35.6) | 3.6 (38.5) | 6.1 (43.0) | 8.8 (47.8) | 10.6 (51.1) | 10.5 (50.9) | 8.8 (47.8) | 6.1 (43.0) | 3.4 (38.1) | 1.5 (34.7) | 5.3 (41.5) |
| Average precipitation mm (inches) | 140.3 (5.52) | 111.1 (4.37) | 106.4 (4.19) | 93.4 (3.68) | 88.3 (3.48) | 96.6 (3.80) | 102.0 (4.02) | 116.1 (4.57) | 102.9 (4.05) | 128.3 (5.05) | 141.1 (5.56) | 144.9 (5.70) | 1,371.2 (53.98) |
| Average precipitation days (≥ 1.0 mm) | 19.3 | 16.6 | 16.6 | 14.5 | 14.2 | 13.8 | 15.7 | 16.2 | 14.7 | 17.5 | 18.8 | 19.4 | 197.2 |
Source: Met Office

== Notable people ==
Arts

- Jimmy Cricket - comedian
- Nick Laird - poet and novelist
- Eamonn McCrystal - singer and broadcaster
- Owen O'Neill - writer, actor, director, and comedian
- Oliver Sheppard (1865–1941) - sculptor, born in Cookstown
- Jonathan Swift - stayed at Loughry Manor as a guest of the Lindsay family while writing Gulliver's Travels (published in 1726)

Business

- Finbarr O'Neill - former CEO of J.D. Power.

Sport

- Kenny Acheson - racing driver
- David Ames - Olympian 2016, 2020 and 2024 (Captain), Great Britain
- Jackie Burns - footballer, Northern Ireland women's national football team
- Stuart Dallas - footballer, Northern Ireland Team
- Terry Devlin - footballer, EFL Championship, Portsmouth F.C.
- Aaron Hughes - footballer, Northern Ireland Team
- Owen Mulligan - Tyrone GAA footballer
- Ian Sloan - 2016 and 2020 Olympian, Great Britain
- Martin Sloan - field hockey, Ireland men's national field hockey team captain of 1990 Men's Hockey World Cup team

Politics

- William Craig - politician, founder of Ulster Vanguard, born in Cookstown
- Bernadette Devlin - Republican Socialist political activist, raised in a small housing estate called Rathbeg

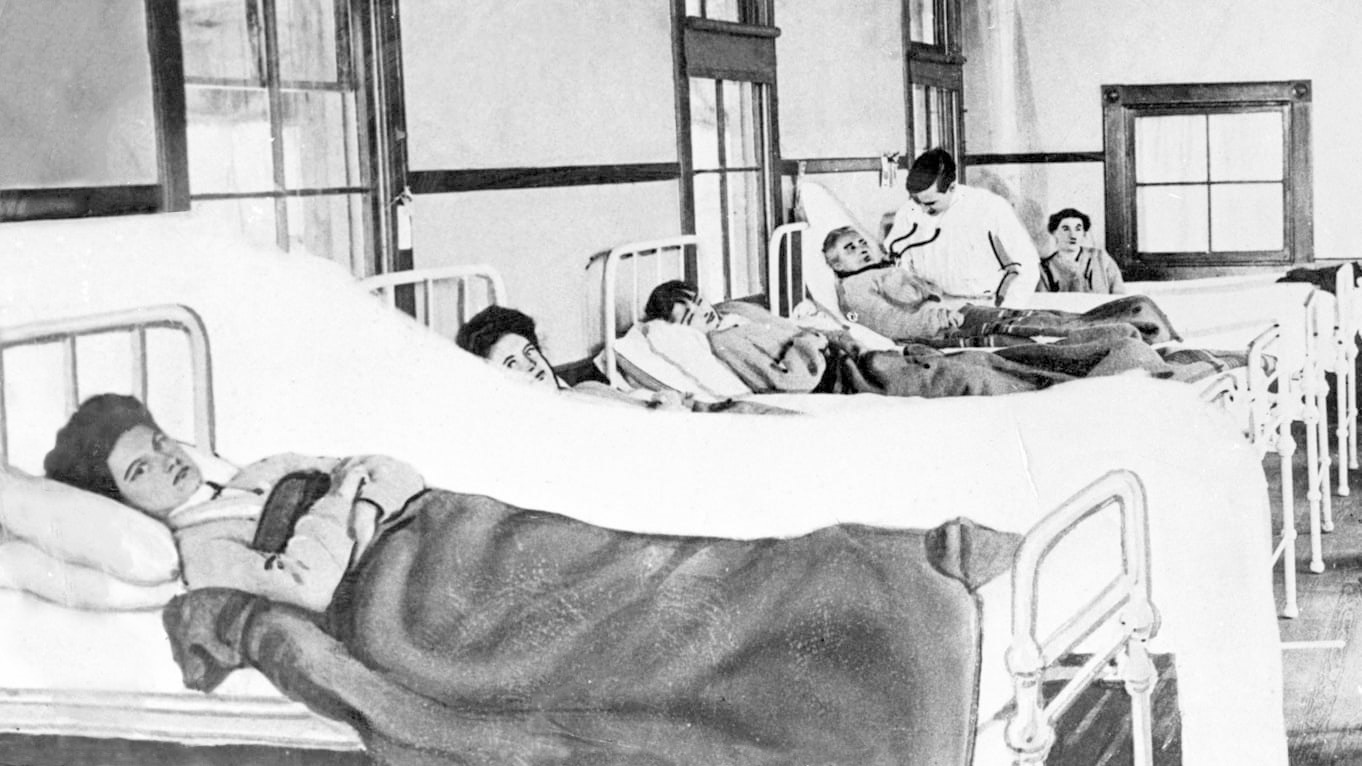
Mallon (foreground) in a hospital bed

Medical

- Major-General Sir Richard Havelock Charles, 1st Baronet (1858–1934) - medical doctor, Serjeant Surgeon to George V
- Mary Mallon, aka Typhoid Mary

== See also ==
- Craigballyharky
- List of localities in Northern Ireland by population
