= Maghery =

Village in County Armagh, Northern Ireland

Coordinates: 54.511°N 6.572°W

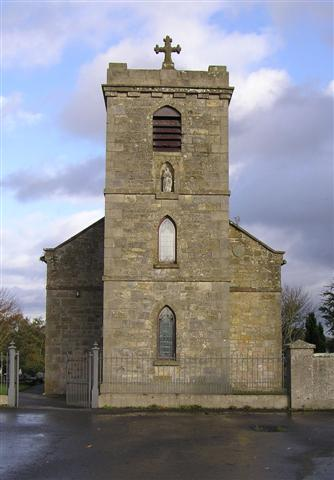
The old Catholic church in Maghery

Maghery (from Irish An Machaire, meaning 'the plain') is a small village and townland in County Armagh, Northern Ireland. It lies on the southwest shore of Lough Neagh, near Derrywarragh Island, in the northwest corner of the county. As it sits between the estuaries of the rivers Blackwater and Bann (which are only two miles apart), Maghery was of strategic significance in the past.

In the 2001 census Maghery had a population of 2001 people. It lies within the Armagh City, Banbridge and Craigavon Borough Council area. It has a park.

== History ==
=== Name ===
Maghery is a shortening of the older name Magherygreenan, which is anglicized from Irish Machaire Grianáin.

=== Maghery Christian Heritage Site ===
In the Maghery area there is a tradition of an ancient road between Armagh and Coney Island known as St Patrick's Trail, which in the past facilitated travel through what is now County Armagh to the north and the south of the modern county via causeways. Various stretches of this 'trail' have also been identified in the neighbouring townland of Derrylileagh as well as a number of others in the locality.

=== Significant events ===
==== 1830 ====
In November 1830, Ribbonmen attacked an Orange band, puncturing some of their drums. In retaliation, the Orangemen 'completely wrecked' (burned to the ground) the Catholic village of Maghery in the passive presence of Colonel Verner (a magistrate) and some of the constabulary police. Seven Orangemen were later charged with offences relating to the attack. All were acquitted. However, some of the victims submitted accounts of the attack to the Parliamentary Select Committee that investigated Orange parades and violence in 1835. The following account of three of their submissions is taken from Two Hundred Years in the Citadel; a research paper by Dr Peter Mulholland, an anthropologist from the nearby town of [Portadown].

Eleanor Campbell, sworn: –Resides in Maghery and keeps a public house; it is near the Blackwater foot, near the quay; was there on Monday the 22nd November last, between 11 and 12 o’clock, as near as she can recollect; was out standing before the door; a great number of men came down across the fields and attacked the house; four men attacked the four windows; deponent then went into the house for fear of her life; the windows were smashed, sashes and all; they attacked deponent’s two daughters in her house, to beat and abuse them; two young men of the party came in, and one of them fired a gun in the house up at the deponent’s son, who was on the loft and had made a noise to come down when he saw the men going to abuse his sister; the skirts of the deponent’s son’s coat appeared as if they had been perforated with shot from the gun; it might have been done with slugs; four or five men then attacked the deponent herself with bayonets, and threatened to take her life if she would not give up a gun which they said she had; they swore deponent on her hand and by the five crosses to tell where it was, and deponent had to send out for it; they got it, and took it away.

A lump of a boy, about 16 or 17 years of age, came forward with a bayonet fastened on a stick, and made a stab at deponent, which struck her; deponent was wounded on her forehead with the bayonet, she thinks by the boy who had it; was also knocked down by a blow of a stone, which she thinks he held in his hand, and which stunned her; all deponent’s delf, glass, and furniture were broken; her spirits and beer spilled, and her clock broken; all the spirits and beer in the bar were spilled; thinks five or six gallons of spirits were spilled; they also robbed deponent of her money, notes, silver, and halfpence, destroyed her feather bed; they took away table linen, and sheets and shirts, and coats, and her children’s clothes, and also a great deal of her own clothes, and left her very little behind; never saw any of the party before, to her knowledge; would not have known her child she was so much confused and put through other; thinks the party was disguised; the boy who struck deponent had his cap drawn down over his forehead; deponent was so frightened she could not tell any of the crowd; they cried out ‘'We are Killyman boys,’’ and would clear all before them; and to see what Lord Charlemont would do for her now; did not know any person by the name of Carner in that neighborhood; deponent thinks 14 or 15 of the party came into her house, as well as she can tell; it is not positive, they were all under arms, and had weapons of some kind or other; some guns, some bayonets, one man had a scyth, and another had a large sword, horseman’s, or like one of the policemen’s; they came in in two or three parties; first, four at a time, then five, then three, and so on; they were in deponent’s house very nearly an hour, more or less; deponent, after her house was wrecked (in about five or six minutes after) saw two policemen, Moneypenny and Crawford; thinks they were not under arms then, but they may have had their side arms; Did not see any other person that deponent knows; at that time they were doing no harm; she reflected on them for not coming down to save her. Sergeant Crawford came into deponent’s house, and the others went down to his brother’s boat; deponent is not just sure, can’t say exactly, but has heard and thinks there were 26 houses wrecked and injured in the town; very few escaped; deponent’s house is quite the opposite end of the town from where the row took place on Saturday; deponent saw no other person that she knew but the two policemen.

Catherine Donnelly, sworn: –Recollects the 22nd November last; was in Maghery on that day; is daughter of last witness, Eleanor Campbell; was at her mother’s house when the party came there; her own house was locked up. When the party came into town, deponent ran with her children to a lighter to save them. She had locked her own house; when she went back to her own house she found it locked; the party must have got in by the window; the door was not forced but the windows were broken; she found her husband’s and her own clothing burning; some of the furniture was injured, broken; whilst in her mother’s house heard a gun fired therein; saw several men with guns and bayonets on them in the house. Deponent did not then, nor does she now, know any of the party concerned in the outrage, she was so much thunderstruck; saw no stranger in the town that day that she knew; she called on Stewart Moneypenny to go up the town with her; he refused, and said he could not do anything for her. Was in Maghery on the Saturday when the scrimage took place; she was in her own house, and four of her children with her; there were men that had been saving her house that morning from the storm; swears positively that no men left her house that day to take part in the ruction.

Sarah Campbell, sworn: –Is daughter of the late Owen Campbell, her mother is living; was in Maghery on Monday the 22nd of November last; was in her mother’s (Mary Campbell’s) house; saw the party, a number of men, coming through town; they were armed; they had all guns and bayonets; knew one of them, the boy who broker her mother’s furniture, his name is John Catton; there were others with him; they did nothing, he did the whole damage; he broke the windows and smashed a deal of other things; broke a clock and a wheel. Deponent lives in the Diamond of the town.

==== 1894 Riot ====
In May 1894, a riot occurred between Maghery residents and members of Loughgall district Orange Institution, as reported by the Belfast Newsletter:

EXTRACT from Belfast Newsletter 14th May 1894.

'NATIONALIST RIOTING NEAR PORTADOWN' ATTACK ON A FUNERAL PROCESSION. SEVERAL PERSONS SHOT.

PORTADOWN, MONDAY. Yesterday, a serious party row took place at Maghery, a village situated on the shores of Lough Neagh, and distant about six miles (10 km) from Portadown. A man named Thomas Irwin died a couple of days previously at his residence in the townland of Cranfield, and his remains were yesterday removed for interment in Milltown graveyard. Irwin was an old and respected member of the Orange Institution, and his brethren of the Loughgall district turned out in considerable numbers to pay him their last tribute of respect. When passing through Maghery a most dastardly and cowardly attack was made on the procession. A Nationalist mob assailed the Orangemen, and endeavoured to beat them back with sticks and other weapons. Stones were showered into the procession, and the hearse was repeatedly struck with the missiles. A regular riot ensued, and in the fight which followed it is alleged that some of the Orange Party who were attacked in this disgraceful manner described fired revolver shots at their assailants. Two members of the Nationalist mob were shot though the wounds inflicted are said not to be of a dangerous character. A number of persons on both sides received wounds of a more or less serious nature inflicted with stones and other weapons used during the progress of the affray.

Information was subsequently conveyed to Portadown, and District Inspector Bigley, Head Constable Donnelly, Sergeants Belford and McQueen, and all the available constables in both barracks drove out to the scene of the disturbances. Acting on information received some time after their arrival in Maghery, the police arrested two prominent members of the Orange party, and when conveying them to the Birches police barrack they were fired at by a crowd of Nationalists. Some of the police dismounted and pursued the crowd to the shores of the lough, where they arrested twelve members of the party. The peace officers subsequently found a loaded gun and powder cask convenient to the place where the shots were fired. Eye-witnesses of the occurrence state that the attack on the funeral procession was thoroughly organised, and that the Nationalist mob fought fiercely and with determination. The affair has naturally aroused considerable indignation and party feeling in the district surrounding Maghery, and the occurrence formed the sole subject of conversation in the neighbourhood yesterday and today.

Captain Slacke, Divisional Commissioner, and Mr. Warburton, county inspector, visited the scene of the occurrence today and made inquiries respecting the affray. In the afternoon the prisoners were brought before Mr. N. L. Townsend, R.M. Armagh, in the Clonmacate Courthouse, Wm. John Vemer and David Fox, member of the Orange party, were charged with firing at and wounding Patrick Tennyson; and the following members of the Nationalist party were charged with unlawful assembly and firing shots: David Skelton, John McNally, James McHelly, Edward Robinson, William Donnolly [sic], Daniel Gallagher, Henry Quinn, John McGrath, James McNally, Daniel Hagan, Joseph Hogan, and Francis Campbell.

District Inspector Bigley, of Portadown, conducted the prosecution on behalf of the Crown: Mr. W. H. Wright, solicitor, Portadown, defended Verner and Fox, and the Nationalist prisoners were not professionally represented. After a number of depositions had been taken Mr. Townsend remanded the prisoners for eight days, accepting bail for the appearance of the Nationalist defendants themselves in $20 each, and two sureties of $10. His Worship refused to accept bail for the Protestant prisoners, Verner and Fox, who were charged with firing at and wounding,

and they we accordingly conveyed to Armagh Jail this evening. During the affray two members in the Protestant party were wounded with revolver bullets. Their names are Eliza Wilson and Robert McMinn. It is said that the Nationalist defendants who fired at the police when they had Verner and Fox in custody will be charged with riot at a portion of the day prior to the time they were arrested.

==== 1936 ====
On 23 May 1936 rioting occurs in Maghery between locals and a party visiting Maghery hotel after rumours spread that members of the visiting party were attacking Maghery chapel.

== Places of interest ==
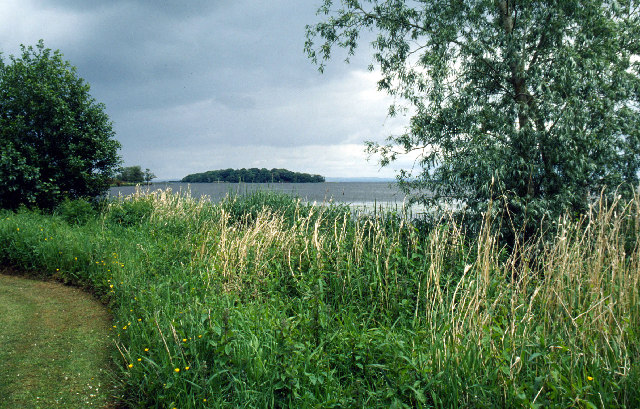
Maghery Country Park, 2004

- The River Blackwater enters Lough Neagh west of Derrywarragh Island and is navigable from Maghery to Blackwatertown. The small Maghery Canal enters the Blackwater south of Derrywarragh Island. At the east end is a small jetty area with a good slipway. This is the site of the former Maghery ferry.
- Maghery Country Park, in the village, covers an area of 30 acres (120,000 m^{2}) comprising 5 km of woodland walks and picnic areas in natural surroundings on the shores of Lough Neagh.
- Coney Island is about 1 km from Maghery and there are boat trips to the island at weekends from Maghery Country Park or Kinnego Marina.

== Transport ==
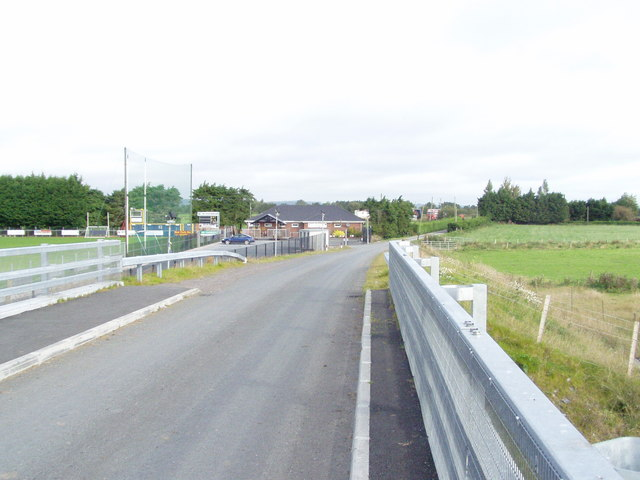
New bridge at Maghery, 2007

A regular bus service is provided by Translink from Maghery to the towns of Portadown and Dungannon (Service 75, Ulsterbus). The journey time by bus from Maghery to either town is about 35 minutes.

Maghery is just 2 miles from the M1 motorway. Traveling westbound (from Belfast) take junction 12 signposted for the B196. Traveling eastbound (from Dungannon) take exit 14 or 13.

Maghery bridge was built in 2001 to restore a link which was lost when the car ferry over the mouth of the River Blackwater at the south-west corner of Lough Neagh was withdrawn in the 1970s. The bridge is for cyclists and walkers and is a key link on the Loughshore Trail cycle route.

== Education ==
- St. Mary's Primary School

== Sport ==
Gaelic games are the main sports played in the Maghery area; Maghery Sean MacDermott's GAC is the local GAA club.

Fishing is popular in Maghery. The River Blackwater is famed throughout Ireland for its big catches; boasting salmon, brown trout, pike, perch, roach, breem and eels.
