= Ram's Island, Northern Ireland =

Island in Lough Neagh, Northern Ireland

Coordinates: 54°35′10″N 6°18′12″W

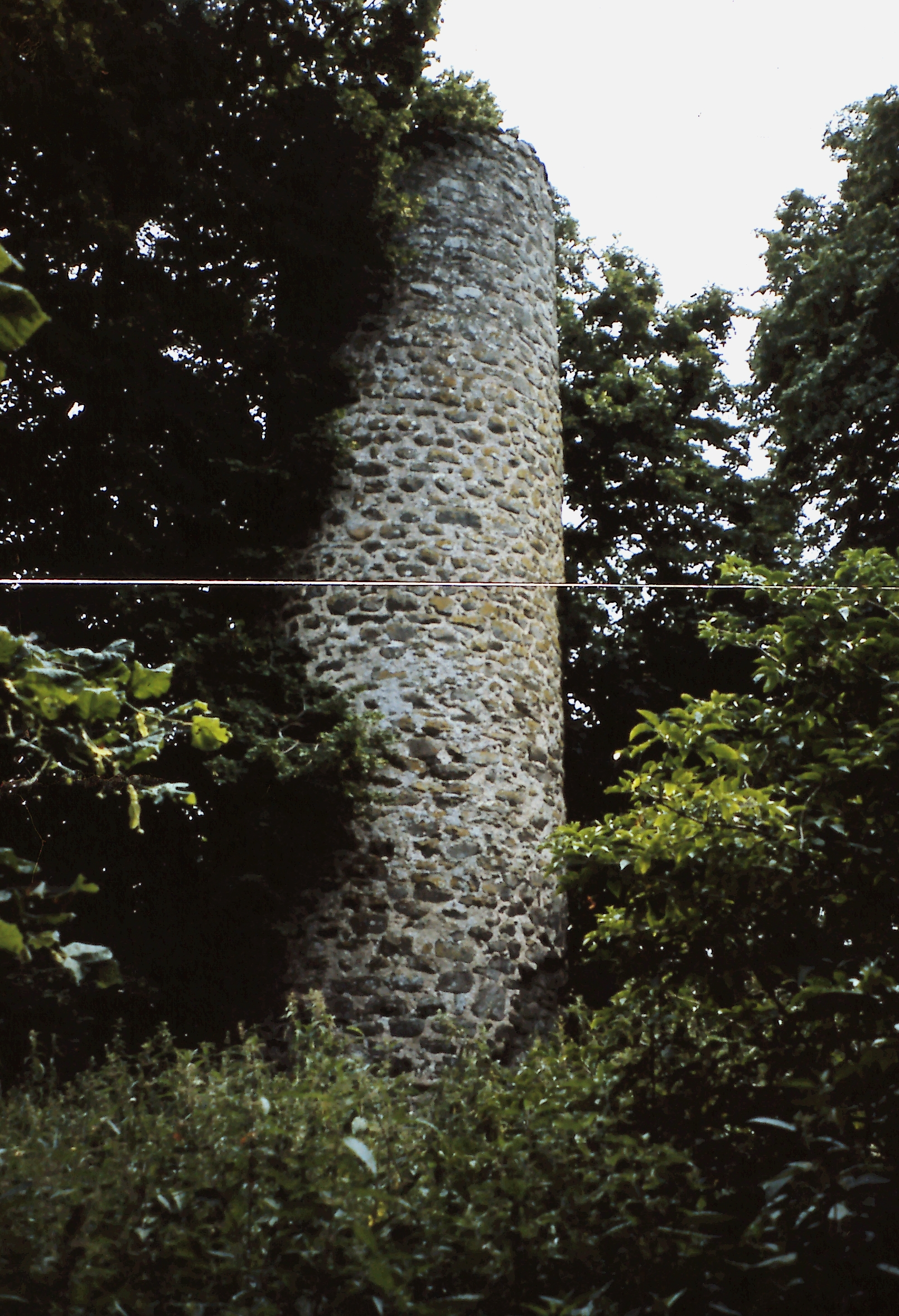
Round Tower ruins located on Ram's Island.

Ram’s Island is the largest island in Lough Neagh, Northern Ireland. It lies near the eastern shore of the lake and is about one mile (1.5 kilometres) long by one-quarter mile (400 metres) wide. Thickly wooded, it is a wildlife haven and includes the ruins of a medieval Irish round tower.

== History ==
The island's original Irish name was Inis Dar Cairgrenn, which could mean "island of Cairgriu's daughter", and later became Inis Dairgreann. This name was anglicized as "Enish Garden" and also survives in the name of an area on the mainland called "Darachrean". The English name "Ram's Island" could have come from the Irish ending –reann or from the island's "resemblance in form to a ram's horn".

In the Middle Ages, an Irish monastery and round tower were built on the island.

Irish outlaw Redmond O'Hanlon is said to have taken refuge on the island in 1679. Several of the founders of the United Irishmen, including Wolfe Tone, visited the island in 1795.

Ram's Island grew in size from approximately 6 to 25 acres (2.5–10 hectares) after Lough Neagh was lowered in the 19th century.

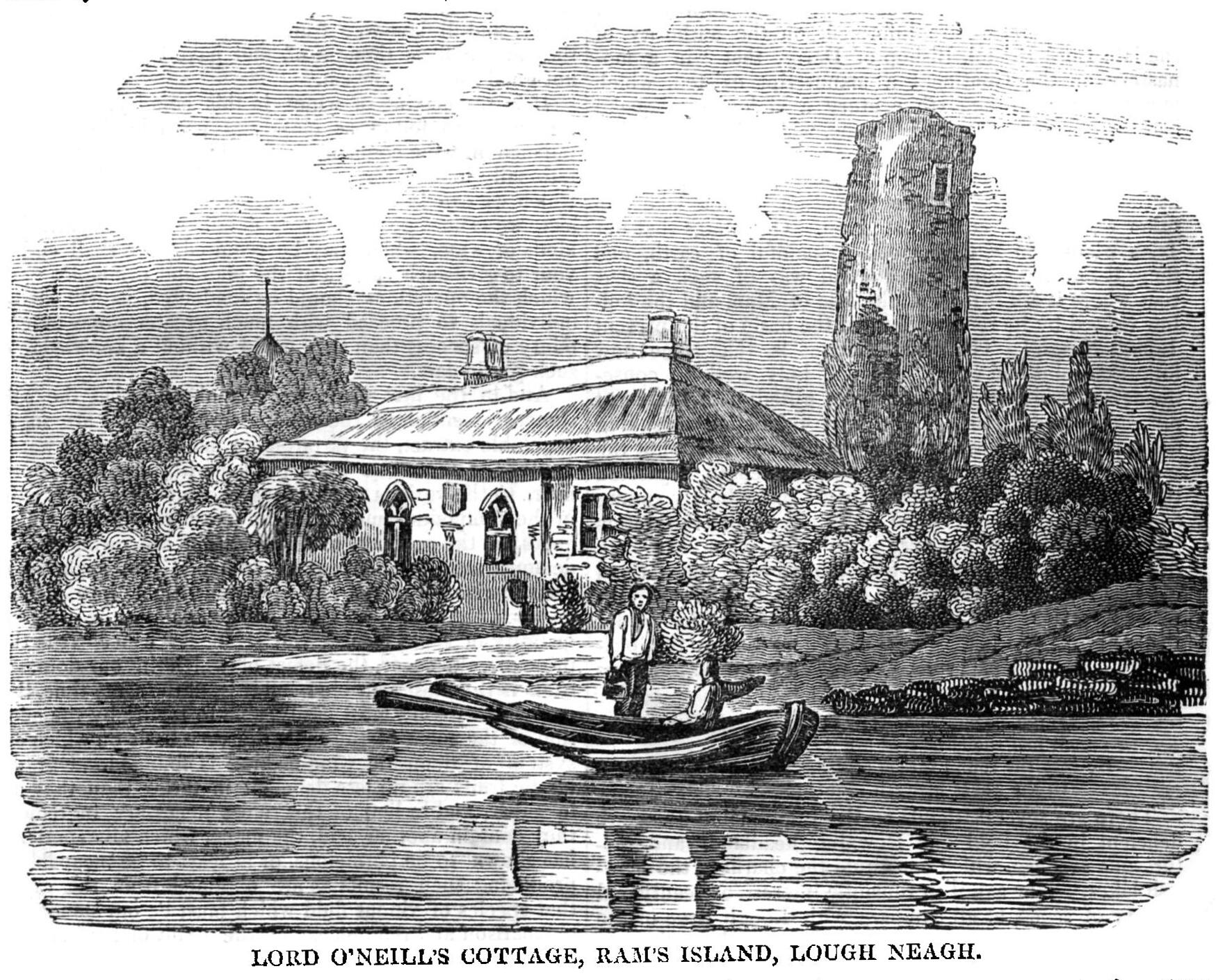
Lord O'Neill's Cottage, Ram's Island, Lough Neagh, 1833

In the early 19th century, the island was bought by the Baron O'Neill, who built two houses there. The island's last permanent inhabitants were the Cardwells, previously caretakers for the O'Neills, in the 1920s.

During the Second World War, there was a Royal Air Force flying boat base at nearby Sandy Bay (RAF Sandy Bay).

In 2005, the River Bann and Lough Neagh Association signed a thirty-year lease for Ram's Island. It received funding from the Lough Neagh Partnership, which was supported by the Department of Agriculture, Environment and Rural Affairs. In 2006 a ferry named The Island Warrior began regular boat trips to the island for tourists.
