= Craigballyharky =

Hill in County Tyrone, Northern Ireland

Craigballyharky (from Irish meaning "rocky ground of O'Harky's homestead") is a large hill in the south-west of the townland of Cookstown, County Tyrone, Northern Ireland. It is also the name of a medieval Irish tuath that spanned the southern half of the parish of Kildress. The northern half was known as Craigballydevine.

== Geology ==
The rock is a tonalite, which shares its name with the landform has yielded a 471 +2/-4 Ma U-Pb zircon age (Hutton et al. 1985).
