= Traad =

Coordinates: 54.72°N 6.529°W

- Location within Northern Ireland
- District: Mid-Ulster
- County: County Londonderry
- Country: Northern Ireland
- Sovereign state: United Kingdom
- Post town: MAGHERAFELT
- Postcode district: BT45
- Police: Northern Ireland
- Fire: Northern Ireland
- Ambulance: Northern Ireland
- UK Parliament: Mid Ulster
- NI Assembly: Mid Ulster

Traad, also known as Traad Point, is a small peninsula near Ballyronan in County Londonderry, Northern Ireland. Located at the north-west of Lough Neagh, it has a large conservation area that is abundant with wildlife as well as a nine-hole golf club. It is situated within Mid-Ulster District.

== The Ulster Freshwater Laboratory ==
It contains the now abandoned Ulster Freshwater Laboratory at its easternmost extent, known as Traad Point. This laboratory was formerly the largest marine biology centre in the UK. As of 2026 this is a proposed environmental education centre.

== See also ==
- List of villages in Northern Ireland
- List of towns in Northern Ireland
