= Jack Crabtree (artist) =

English figurative painter and teacher (1938–2026)

- Born: 1938; Rochdale, Lancashire, England
- Died: 2026 (aged 87)
- Education: Rochdale College of Art; Saint Martin's School of Art; Royal Academy Schools
- Known for: Painting; Drawing
- Elected: 56 Group Wales
- Patrons: National Coal Board

Jack Crabtree (1938–2026) was an English contemporary figurative painter and teacher. He is known for a series of paintings documenting the South Wales coal industry.

== Early life and education ==
Crabtree was born in Rochdale, Lancashire, England in 1938, the son of Roland Crabtree, a gasworks labourer and Lilian, a cotton mill worker.

He studied at Rochdale College of Art, then at Saint Martin's School of Art, London (1957–59) and then at Royal Academy Schools, London (1959–61).

== Career ==
After leaving the Royal Academy, Crabtree lived and worked for a number of years in Rochdale and Salford and then at Newport in South Wales, before taking up an appointment in 1984 as Professor and Head of Fine Arts at the University of Ulster in Belfast.

Crabtree was elected a member of the 56 Group Wales (1971–75).

By the late 1990s he had been the subject of more than 50 solo shows, including at the Howard Roberts Gallery in Cardiff, the Trafford Gallery in Mayfair and the Kerlin Gallery in Dublin. Later shows included those in 2024 at Y Tabernacl, Machynlleth and at the Ruthin Craft Centre.

In 1994 he retired to Nantlle, in North Wales, with the loft of his house converted into a studio. He continued to work, despite gradually losing his sight.

Over the course of his career he had featured in over 70 solo exhibitions. His work can be found in many public collections.

== Style ==
Crabtree was known as a Social Realist, and he was commissioned by National Coal Board to illustrate the working lives of South Wales miners in south Wales. Other commissions came from BP, Rochdale Education Authority and a mural for the Diocese of Monmouth. His 1990 show at the Kerlin Gallery, Dublin, included several dozen studies of the Irish writer Francis Stuart, his tribute to the painter Francis Bacon, whose work he held in high regard.

Crabtree's style was described in 1978 by Margaret Richards of Tribune magazine:

"Crabtree is a social realist who works in a natural style that is neither didactic nor over-emphatic. Sometimes his imagery is exhilarating, full of energetic figures, and sometimes sad and sensitive, showing old or weary men struggling to keep going. His vision is affectionate rather than romantic. He sees wild hillsides as a beautiful setting for one of the grimmest jobs facing any man. In his paintings, that beauty and that grimness are parts of an inter-locking reality that has stimulated his creative imagination; while in his graphics the spare outlines and meticulous observation of human nature has been likened to George Grosz's. The comparison is misleading, for Crabtree's sense of humour rarely turns into satire."

== Teaching ==
- 1961–66: Salford School of Art, and teaching in schools in the Salford and Rochdale area.
- 1966–74: Lecturer at the College of Art in Newport.
- 1978 onwards: Senior Lecturer at the Gwent College of Further Education
- 1983–86: Professor and Head of Fine Art at the University of Ulster, Belfast.

== Public collections ==
Crabree's work is kept in several public collections, including:

- Arts Council in Ireland
- Arts Council of Northern Ireland
- Glynn Vivian Art Gallery Swansea
- Grundy Art Gallery, Blackpool
- National Coal Mining Museum for England, Wakefield
- National Library of Wales
- National Museum Cardiff
- National Trust, Mount Stewart, County Down
- Newport Museum and Art Gallery, Newport
- Ulster Museum, Belfast
- University of South Wales (Glamorgan), Gregynog Hall, Tregynon, Newtown

== Awards ==
- 1959/60: Kenyon's Foundation, Rochdale Education Authority, traveling bursary to France
- 1974/75: Fellowship at the National Coal Board
- 1975/76: Gregynog Arts Fellowship, University of Wales
- 1977/78: First International Ruhr Arts Fellowship awarded by the West German government

== Notable commissions ==
- 1971: Artist at Work – murals on the theme of Owain Glyndŵr for the council chambers at Plas Machynlleth
- 1974/75: a pictorial record of the changing face of the coalfields of South Wales for the National Coal Board
- 1992/93: commissioned by the National Trust to record Patterson's Spade Mill, Northern Ireland, pre-restoration

== Personal life and death ==
Crabtree married Mary Ellis in 1962. They had two sons, Tom and Sam. Mary died in the late 1960s.

On 13 August 2026, his son Sam announced that Crabtree had died. He was 87.

Writing on Instagram, MuseumWales said: "We're saddened to learn of the death of artist Jack Crabtree, whose work offered a powerful and compassionate portrait of working-class life. Crabtree developed a distinctive social realist style, documenting miners, steelworkers, industrial communities and everyday people with humanity, insight and respect."

== Other sources ==
- Buckman, David (1998). Artists in Britain Since 1945. Art Dictionaries Ltd. ISBN 9780953260904.
