= Derrywarragh Island =

Island in Lough Neagh, Northern Ireland

Derrywarragh
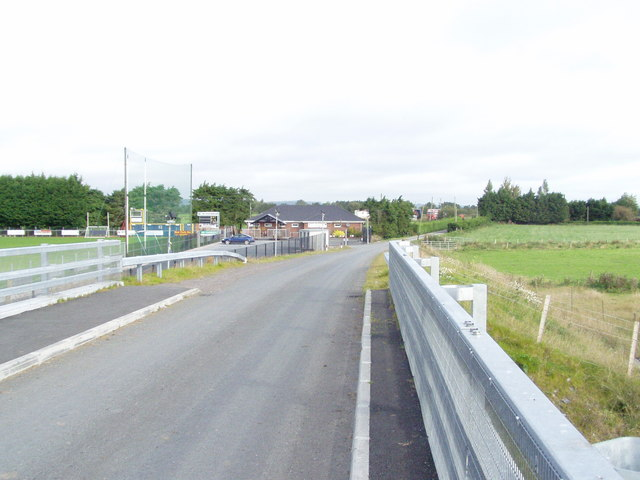
- Looking towards Derrywarragh Island on the bridge connecting the island and Maghery
- Interactive map of Derrywarragh

Geography
- Location: Lough Neagh, County Armagh
- Coordinates: 54.516°N 6.571°W
- Area: 0.6 km^{2} (0.23 sq mi)
- Length: 1 km (0.6 mi)
- Width: 0.6 km (0.37 mi)
- Highest elevation: 12 m (39 ft)
- Highest point: O'Connor's Stronghold

Administration
- United Kingdom

Derrywarragh Island is a boulder clay island on Lough Neagh, Northern Ireland. It is linked by a bridge to Maghery, County Armagh. Originally a peninsula, it was cut off from the mainland in 1803 when a small canal was dug. Most of the island is flat grassland, woodland, and marshes. The island is also regularly the home of wintering and breeding birds.

== History ==
On entering the River Blackwater barges used to sail down the river for about three miles to Lough Neagh at Maghery, where they navigated the mouth of the River by Derrywarragh Peninsula, causing endless delays through silting, flooding and blockages. In 1802 work started under the direction of Daniel Monks to excavate a short channel from the eastern bank of the Blackwater straight to the lough shore through the lower section of Derrywarragh Peninsula thus turning it into what is now Derrywarragh Island. This cut, "the Maghery Cut", finished in 1803, allowed vessels to avoid the sand bars at the river’s mouth. A pontoon bridge was erected and was later replaced by a fixed bridge to allow access onto Derrywarragh Island by the main resident of the island who owns a livestock haulage business and was noticing weakness as the lorry passed over the bridge.

== Ecology and conservation ==
Derrywarragh Island forms part of the Lough Neagh and Lough Beg Special Protection Area (SPA) and Ramsar site, recognized for its international importance as a wetland habitat. The island's mosaic of wet grassland, wet woodland, marshes and swamps provides critical habitat for numerous waterfowl species.

Notable species include whooper swans and various duck species including tufted duck, pochard, and goldeneye. The floodplain grazing marsh habitat on the island is maintained through traditional agricultural practices to help preserve the ecological character of the wetland.

== Places of interest ==
The O'Connors Stronghold can be found on the north-east end of the island. It is a 17th-century fortified house. The existing remains measure about 18 by 14 feet (5.5 m × 4.3 m) and include a standing 32 feet (9.8 m) brick chimney stack. According to Craigavon Museum Services, it was probably a "watchtower to protect the mouth of the River Blackwater".

== Sport ==
The island is also the home of Maghery Sean MacDermott's GAA club.
