= The Loup =

Village in County Londonderry, Northern Ireland

Coordinates: 54.700°N 6.598°W

The Loup: Irish: an Lúb
- Village
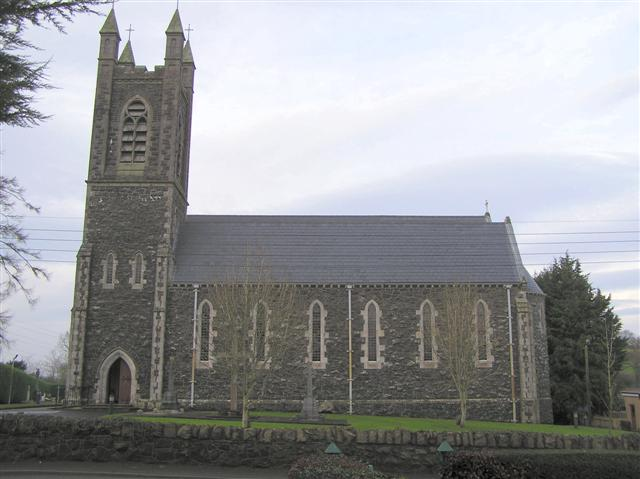
- St Patrick's Roman Catholic Church, Loup

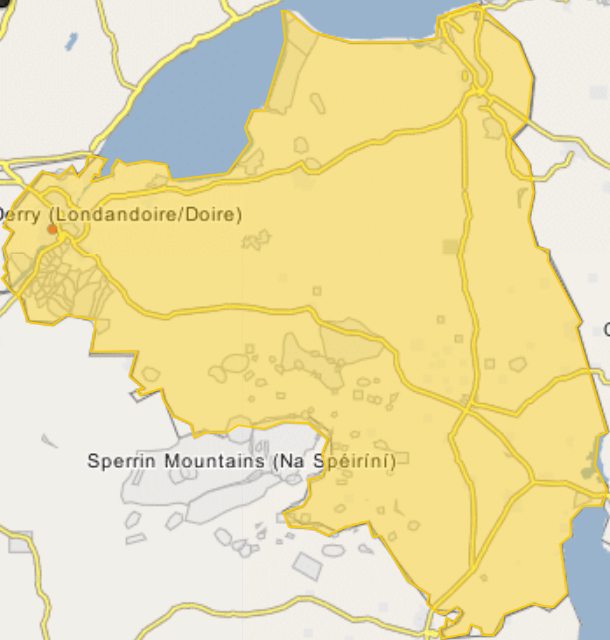
- Location within Northern Ireland
- District: Mid Ulster
- County: County Londonderry
- Country: Northern Ireland
- Sovereign state: United Kingdom
- Post town: MAGHERAFELT
- Postcode district: BT
- Police: Northern Ireland
- Fire: Northern Ireland
- Ambulance: Northern Ireland
- UK Parliament: Mid Ulster
- NI Assembly: Mid Ulster

The Loup (Irish: an Lúb) is a small village in County Londonderry, Northern Ireland. It lies near the western shore of Lough Neagh between Moneymore, Magherafelt, Ballyronan and Coagh, within the district of Mid Ulster.

== Demographics ==
=== 1991 Census ===
In the 1991 census, there were 172 people living in the village. Of those, 89 (51.7%) were male and 83 (48.3%) were female.

=== 1981 Census ===
In the 1981 census, there were 99 people living in the village. Of those, 51 (51.5%) were male and 48 (48.5%) were female.

== Sport ==
Gaelic games are very popular in the area, with St. Patricks CAC being the local club.

Former Gaelic footballer for Derry GAA and manager for St. Patrick's GAC, Johnny McBride, is from the village.
