= Ballinderry River =

Special Area of Conservation river in Northern Ireland

Coordinates: 54.6334°N 6.63709°W

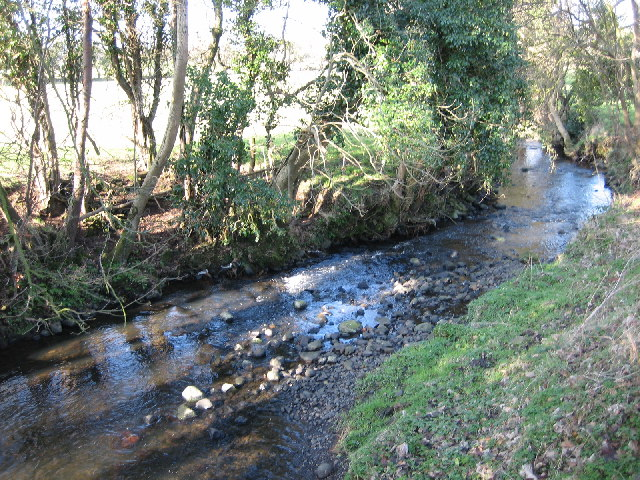
- Native name: Abhainn Bhaile an Doire; An Bhior

Location
- Country: Northern Ireland

Physical characteristics
- Mouth
  - location: Lough Neagh
- Length: 24.1 km (15.0 mi)

The Ballinderry River, or River Ballinderry (Irish: Abhainn Bhaile an Doire), is a river that flows through Cookstown, County Tyrone and Ballinderry, County Tyrone. It is one of Northern Ireland's 54 Special Areas of Conservation.
