= Ballyronan =

Village in County Londonderry, Northern Ireland

Coordinates: 54.7077°N 6.5323°W

Ballyronan: Irish: Baile Uí Rónáin
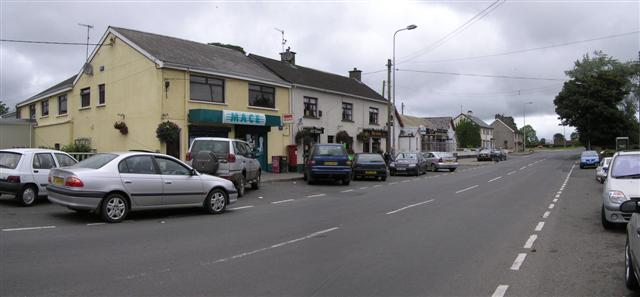
- The village centre

- Location within Northern Ireland
- Population: 616 (2021 census)
- Irish grid reference: H9485
  - Belfast: 38 miles
- District: Mid-Ulster
- County: County Londonderry
- Country: Northern Ireland
- Sovereign state: United Kingdom
- Post town: MAGHERAFELT
- Postcode district: BT45
- Dialling code: 028
- Police: Northern Ireland
- Fire: Northern Ireland
- Ambulance: Northern Ireland
- UK Parliament: Mid Ulster
- NI Assembly: Mid Ulster

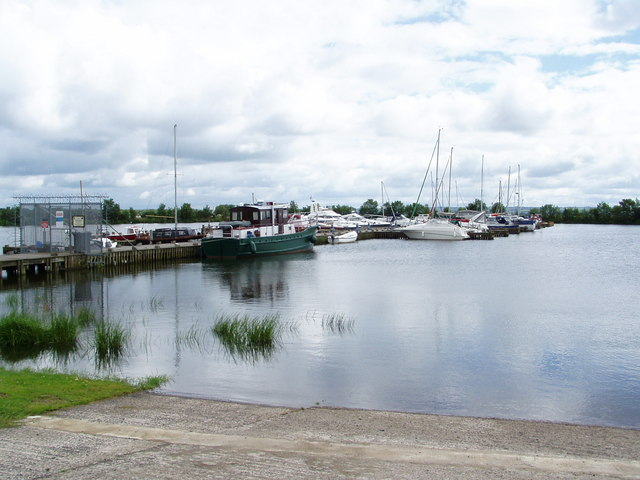
The local marina and harbour, on the shores of Lough Neagh

Ballyronan (from Irish Baile Uí Rónáin 'Ó Rónáin's townland') is a village and townland in County Londonderry, Northern Ireland, on the northwestern shore of Lough Neagh. The village is 5 miles (8 km) from Magherafelt and 12 miles (19 km) from Cookstown. It is situated within Mid-Ulster District. The village population was 616 at the 2021 census, an increase from 568 at the 2011 census.

== History ==
The village was founded by Daniel Gaussen in 1788. He built a forge on the shore of Lough Neagh for manufacturing spades and soon afterwards erected stores. This led to the building of quays and the formation of a port, which greatly benefited the surrounding countryside. A large distillery was erected in 1824, and a brewery in 1830, by Messrs. Gaussen and Sons. Vessels of about 50 tons burden plied regularly between the village and Belfast, exporting wheat, fruit, spirits, ale, and freestone, and bringing back barley, timber, slate, iron, wine and groceries.

The village was well situated for trade as besides being on Lough Neagh, several roads diverge from it. The village was situated on the estate of the Salters Company of London. Near it are the ruins of Salterstown Castle.

In May 1922, during the Irish War of Independence, a Royal Irish Constabulary sergeant, Frederick Frizelle and two Special Constables, Edward Hegarty and Thomas Hunter were returning from patrol in Ballyronan when they were ambushed and killed by the Irish Republican Army. In retaliation, a week later, Special Constables shot three Catholic brothers at their home in Ballyronan, killing one, James McKeown Jr. (27).

=== The Troubles ===
More recently, Eugene Martin, a Catholic civilian was murdered by the Ulster Volunteer Force (UVF) on 2 February 1993.

Winston Finlay, a Protestant, was shot in front of his wife by the IRA as he arrived at his home in Ballyronan. The gunmen opened fire as he got out of the car to open the garage door to allow his wife to drive in. He had previously been a full-time UDR soldier serving in the Intelligence Cell in Magherafelt, County Londonderry and had also served in the RAF for 14 years. He was a member of the Ballyronan Orange Lodge and was a serving member of the RUCR when he was murdered.

== Governance ==
Ballyronan constitutes part of the Ballinderry ward (named after the Ballinderry River) of Mid-Ulster District Council. This ward elects six councillors to the 16-person council. At the 2005 election, there were two Social Democratic and Labour Party and two Sinn Féin members chosen to represent this ward, as well as one Ulster Unionist and one Democratic Unionist. Notably, this ward did not see an election, as the number of candidates standing for office was the same as the number of seats available. Ballyronan is within the Mid Ulster Northern Ireland Assembly constituency and UK Parliament constituency.

== Geography ==
The village is a cluster settlement, built around the junction of four roads which pass through the village. These roads go to Coagh, The Loup, Magherafelt and Toome.

== Demography ==
On Census Day 27 March 2011, in Ballyronan Settlement, considering the resident population:

98.59% were from the white (including Irish Traveller) ethnic group;

83.98% belong to or were brought up in the Catholic religion and 13.73% belong to or were brought up in a 'Protestant and Other Christian (including Christian related)' religion; and

16.37% indicated that they had a British national identity, 43.84% had an Irish national identity and 41.02% had a Northern Irish national identity*.

== Amenities ==
The small village centre contains a mini-supermarket, fish and chip shop, pubs, and two wine sellers. The business units at the Quay contain a beauty parlor, Chinese take-away, chip shop, architects and development association for Lough Neagh.

On the shore just off the main street lies the Marina Complex containing the local community centre, a bar, boat berthing yard, boat slipways and a harbour with 72 berths, a play park, picnic areas, caravan/camping site, and small forest.

== Sport ==
Soccer

Arthur David Ash Gaussen was the first and so far only internationally capped person from the village. Playing for Moyola Park on the grounds of Lord Spencer Chichester's estate in Castledawson when first called into the Irish squad. Lord Chichester was the inaugural president of the Irish FA, and Moyola Park the first-ever winners of the Irish Cup. Arthur Gaussen won his first two caps while with Moyola Park, and the remaining four later in the decade while playing for Magherafelt F.C. Gaussen would later become a Justice of the Peace and Lord Lieutenant of County Londonderry. Gaussen Villas in Ballyronan is named in recognition to his family. Representative Honours: Ireland: 6 Full Caps (1884–1889).

Gaelic Football

Gaelic Football is a popular sport in the area, with The Loup being the local Gaelic Athletic Association club. Ballyronan has remained void of any Gaelic football team but for those who were born and reared in the village, they usually choose to play for the Loup Gaelic Football team.

The other residents of the village who have an interest in Gaelic football will play football for other teams in the neighbouring hamlets of;

- Ardboe for Ardboe O'Donovan Rossa GAC
- Ballymaguigan for Ballymaguigan GAC
- Ballinderry for Ballinderry Shamrocks

Watersports As the village is situated at the Northern tip of Lough Neagh, this provides a base to host watersports events and since 2001 the village has hosted the Lough Neagh Triathlon each summer. The event has also doubled as the Irish Triathlon Championships. Fishing and sailing are also popular in and around Ballyronan.

== See also ==
- List of villages in Northern Ireland
- Traad Point
