= Lough Neagh =

Freshwater lake in Northern Ireland

- Loch nEathach (Irish); Loch Neagh (Ulster Scots)
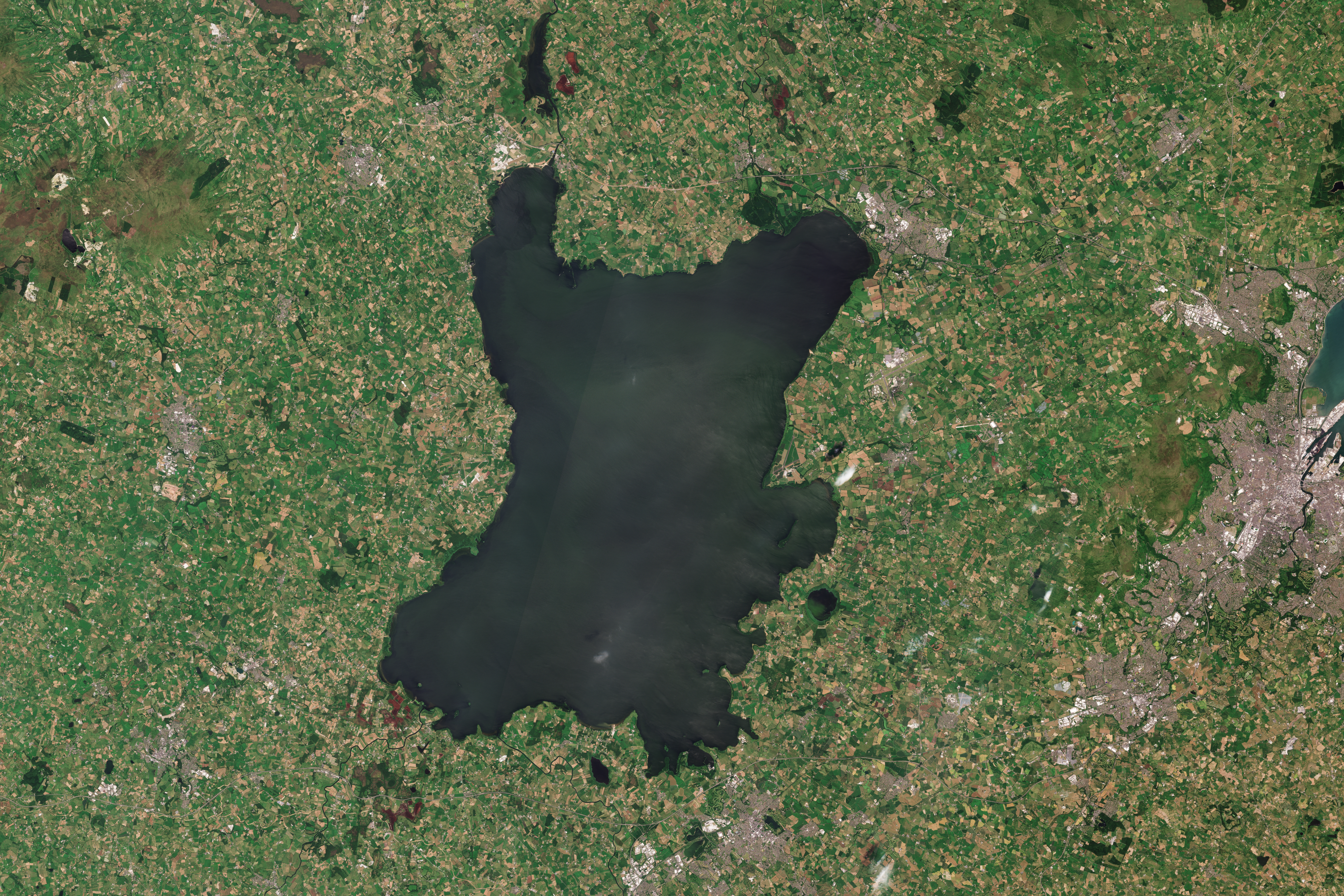
- A ESA Sentinel-2 image of Lough Neagh

- Location within Northern Ireland
- Location: Northern Ireland, UK
- Coordinates: 54°37′06″N 6°23′43″W
- Type: Fresh Water Lough/Lake
- Primary inflows: Upper Bann, Six Mile Water, Glenavy River, Crumlin River, Blackwater, Moyola River, Ballinderry River, River Main
- Primary outflows: Lower Bann
- Catchment area: 1,760 mi^{2} (4,550 km^{2})
- Basin countries: Northern Ireland (91%); Republic of Ireland (9%)
- Max. length: 19 mi (31 km)
- Max. width: 9.3 mi (15.0 km)
- Surface area: 151 mi^{2} (390 km^{2})
- Average depth: 30 ft (9.1 m)
- Max. depth: 80 ft (24 m)
- Water volume: 0.85 mi^{3} (3.5 km^{3})
- Shore length^{1}: 78 mi (125 km)
- Surface elevation: 48.0 ft (14.63 m)
- Islands: (see below)

Ramsar Wetland
- Official name: Lough Neagh & Lough Beg
- Designated: 5 January 1976
- Reference no.: 74
- ^{1} Shore length is not a well-defined measure.

Lough Neagh (/lɒx ˈneɪ/ lokh NAY; Irish: Loch nEathach [l̪ˠɔx ˈn̠ʲaha(x)]) is a freshwater lake in Northern Ireland and the largest lake on the island of Ireland and in the British Isles. It has a surface area of 148 square miles (383 square kilometres) and is about 19 miles (31 km) long and 9 miles (14 km) wide. According to Northern Ireland Water, it supplies 40.7% of Northern Ireland's drinking water.

Its main inflows are the Upper River Bann and Blackwater, and its main outflow is the Lower Bann. There are several small islands, including Ram's Island, Coney Island and Derrywarragh Island. The lake bed is owned by the 12th Earl of Shaftesbury and the lake is managed by Lough Neagh Partnership. Its name comes from Irish Loch nEachach [ˌl̪ˠɔx ˈn̠ʲahəx], meaning "Eachaidh's lake".

From 2023 blue-green algae has polluted the lough.

== Geography ==
With an area of 148 square miles (383 km^{2}), it is the British Isles' largest lake by area and ranks 34th on the list of largest lakes of Europe. Located 20 miles (32 km) west of Belfast, it is about 19 miles (31 km) long and 9 miles (14 km) wide. It is very shallow around the margins and the average depth in the main body of the lake is about 30 feet (9 m), although at its deepest the lough is about 80 feet (24 m) deep.

=== Geology ===
Geologically the Lough Neagh Basin is a depression, built from many tectonic events dating back as far as 400 million years ago. These tectonic events are responsible for a NE-SW bedrock structure which has controlled many subsequent events. During the Paleozoic era, the Lough Neagh Basin was a depositional graben.

=== Hydrology ===
Of the 1,760-square-mile (4,550 km^{2}) catchment area, around 9% lies in the Republic of Ireland and 91% in Northern Ireland; altogether 43% of the land area of Northern Ireland is drained into the lough, which itself flows out northwards to the sea via the River Bann. As one of its sources is the Upper Bann, the Lough can itself be considered part of the Bann. Lough Neagh is fed by many tributaries, including the rivers Main (34 mi, 55 km), Six Mile Water (21 mi, 34 km), Upper Bann (40 mi, 64 km), Blackwater (57 mi, 92 km), Ballinderry (29 mi, 47 km) and Moyola (31 mi, 50 km).

The lough's water has been monitored extensively since 1974 and undergone considerable eutrophication and toxic algal blooms. According to a 2016 study, it "has become much enriched as a result of anthropogenic eutrophication, most of which occurred in the last century... Despite the recent changes in nutrient loading the lake is still currently classed as hypereutrophic". Each summer since 2023, toxic algal blooms, mostly caused by agricultural run-off, have spread across the lake (see section algal bloom crises below).

=== Islands and peninsulas ===
- Coney Island
- Croaghan Island
- Derrywarragh Island
- Gartree Point
- Kinnegoe (peninsula)
- Kinturk (peninsula)
- Oxford Island (peninsula)
- Padian
- Ram's Island
- Tolans Flat
- Traad (peninsula)

=== Towns and villages ===
Towns and villages near the Lough include Craigavon, Antrim, Crumlin, Randalstown, Toomebridge, Ballyronan, Ballinderry, Moortown, Ardboe, Brockagh, Maghery, Lurgan and Magherafelt.

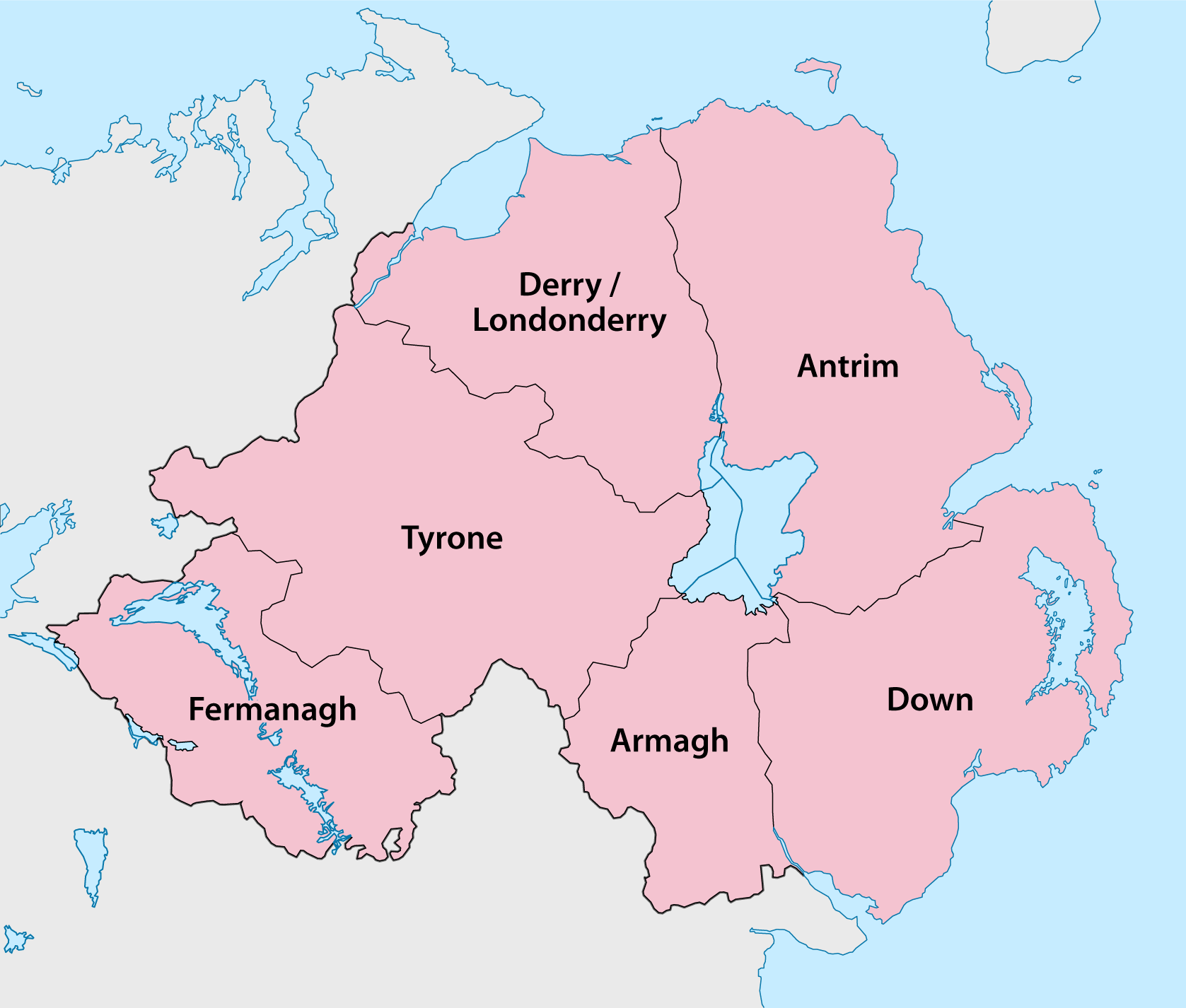
Counties of Northern Ireland, relative to Lough Neagh

Districts of Northern Ireland, relative to Lough Neagh

=== Counties ===
Five of the six counties of Northern Ireland have shores on the Lough (only Fermanagh does not), and its area is split among them. The counties are listed clockwise:

1. Antrim (eastern side and northern shore of the lake)
2. Down (small part in the south-east)
3. Armagh (south)
4. Tyrone (west)
5. Londonderry (northern part of west shore)

=== Local government districts ===
The area of the lake is split between four local government districts of Northern Ireland, which are listed clockwise:

- 3 Antrim and Newtownabbey, in the north-east
- 4 Lisburn and Castlereagh, in the east
- 6 Armagh, Banbridge and Craigavon, in the south
- 9 Mid Ulster, in the west

== Management ==
Lough Neagh is managed by Lough Neagh Partnership Ltd, a stakeholder group made up of elected representatives, land-owners, fishermen, sand traders and local community representatives. Lough Neagh Partnership is responsible for the lough's conservation, promotion and sustainable development together with navigation of the Lough.

== Uses ==
Although the Lough is used for a variety of recreational and commercial activities, it is exposed and tends to get extremely rough very quickly in windy conditions.

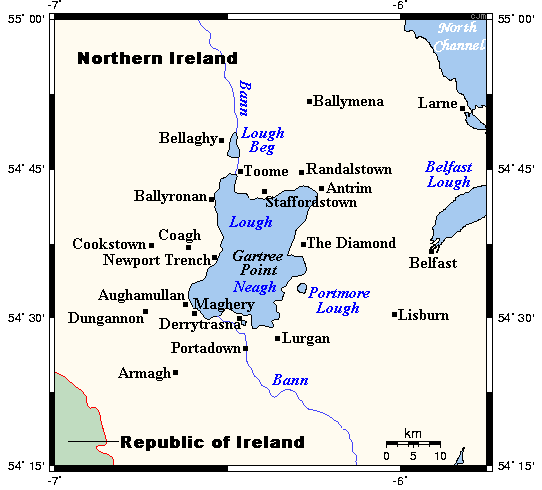
Lough Neagh and settlements surrounding it

=== Water supply ===
According to Northern Ireland Water, Lough Neagh supplies 40.7% of Northern Ireland's drinking water. There have long been plans to increase the amount of water drawn from the lough, through a new water treatment works at Hog Park Point, but these are yet to materialise. The lough's ownership by the 12th Earl of Shaftesbury has implications for planned changes to state-run domestic water services in Northern Ireland, as the lough is also used as a sewage outfall, and this arrangement is only permissible through Crown immunity.

=== Navigation ===
Traditional working boats on Lough Neagh include wide-beamed 4.9-to-6.4-metre (16 to 21 ft) clinker-built, sprit-rigged working boats and smaller flat-bottomed "cots" and "flats". Barges, here called "lighters", were used until the 1940s to transport coal over the lough and adjacent canals. Until the 17th century, log boats (coití) were the main means of transport. Few traditional boats are left now, but a community-based group on the southern shore of the lough is rebuilding a series of working boats.

In the 19th century, three canals were constructed, using the lough to link various ports and cities: the Lagan Navigation provided a link from Belfast, the Newry Canal linked to the port of Newry, and the Ulster Canal led to the Lough Erne navigations, providing a navigable inland route via the River Shannon to Limerick, Dublin and Waterford. The Lower Bann was also navigable to Coleraine and the Antrim coast, and the short Coalisland Canal provided a route for coal transportation. Of these waterways, only the Lower Bann remains open today, although a restoration plan for the Ulster Canal is in progress.

Lough Neagh Rescue provides a search and rescue service 24 hours a day and has three stations, situated around the lough. These are at Antrim, Ardboe and Kinnego Marinas, Kinnego being its headquarters and founding station. It is a voluntary service funded by the district councils bordering the Lough. Its members are highly trained and are a declared facility for the Maritime and Coastguard Agency which co-ordinates rescues on Lough Neagh.

=== Bird watching ===
Lough Neagh attracts birdwatchers from many nations due to the number and variety of birds which winter and summer in the boglands and shores around the lough.

=== Flora ===
The flora of the north-east of Northern Ireland includes the algae:

- Chara aspera
- Chara globularis var. globularis
- Chara globularis var. virgate
- Chara vulgaris var. vulgaris
- Chara vulgaris var. papillata
- Tolypella nidifica var. glomerata

Records of Angiospermae include:

- Ranunculus flammula var. pseudoreptans
- Ranunculus auricomus, Ranunculus sceleratus
- Ranunculus circinatus, Ranunculus peltatus
- Thalictrum flavum, Thalictrum minus subsp. minus
- Nymphaea alba
- Ceratophyllum demersum
- Subularia aquatica
- Erophila verna sub. verna
- Cardamine pratensis
- Cardamine impatiens
- Cardamine flexuosa
- Rorippa palustris
- Rorippa amphibia
- Reseda luteola
- Viola odorata
- Viola reichenbachiana
- Viola tricolor ssp. curtissi
- Hypericum androsaemum
- Hypericum maculatum
- Elatine hydropiper
- Silene vulgaris
- Silene dioica
- Saponaria officinalis
- Cerastium arvense
- Cerastium semidecandrum
- Cerastium diffusum
- Sagina nodosa
- Spergularia rubra
- Spergularia rupicola
- Chenopodium bonus-henricus
- Chenopodium polyspermum

=== Fishing ===
Eel fishing has been a major industry in Lough Neagh for centuries. These European eels make their way from the Sargasso Sea in the Atlantic Ocean, some 4,000 miles (6,000 km) along the Gulf Stream to the mouth of the River Bann, and then make their way into the lough. They remain there for some 10 to 15 years, maturing, before returning to the Sargasso to spawn. Today Lough Neagh eel fisheries export their eels to restaurants all over the world, and the Lough Neagh Eel has been granted Protected Geographical Status under European Union law.

Nobel laureate Seamus Heaney's collection of poems A Lough Neagh Sequence celebrates the eel-fishermen's traditional techniques and the natural history of their catch.

Other fish species in the lake include dollaghan (a variety of brown trout native to the lake), salmon, trout, perch and pollan; bream, gudgeon, pike and rudd are also found, but are less common.

== Human history ==
=== Name ===
The lough's English name derives from Irish Loch nEachach, meaning 'Eachaidh's lake'. At the start of the Plantation of Ulster, the English attempted to rename the lake 'Lough Sydney' and 'Lough Chichester', in honour of the Lord Deputies, but these did not supplant the older name.

=== Mythology and folklore ===
In the Irish mythical tale Cath Maige Tuired ("the Battle of Moytura"), Lough Neagh is called one of the twelve chief loughs of Ireland. The origin of the lake and its name is explained in an Irish tale that was written down in the Middle Ages but is likely pre-Christian. According to the tale, the lake is named after Echaid (modern spelling: Eochaidh or Eachaidh), who was the son of Mairid (Mairidh), a king of Munster. Echaid falls in love with his stepmother, a young woman named Ébliu (Ébhlinne). They try to elope, accompanied by many of their retainers, but someone kills their horses.

In some versions, the horses are killed by Midir (Midhir), which may be another name for Ébliu's husband Mairid. Óengus (Aonghus) then appears and gives them an enormous horse that can carry all their belongings. Óengus warns that they must not let the horse rest or it will be their doom.

After reaching Ulster the horse stops and urinates, and a spring rises from the spot. Echaid builds a house there and covers the spring with a capstone to stop its overflowing. One night, the capstone is not replaced and the spring overflows, drowning Echaid and most of his family, and creating Loch n-Echach (Loch nEachach, the lake of Eachaidh).

The character Echaid refers to the Dagda, a god of the ancient Irish who was also known as Echaid Ollathair (meaning "horseman, father of all"). Ébliu, Midir and Óengus were also names of deities. Dáithí Ó hÓgáin writes that the idea of a supernatural being creating the landscape with its own body is an ancient one common to many pre-Christian cultures. A Gaelic sept called the Uí Echach ("descendants of Echaid") dwelt in the area and it is likely their name comes from the cult of the god. They gave their name to the territory of Iveagh.

Another tale tells how the lake was formed when Ireland's legendary giant Fionn mac Cumhaill (Finn McCool) scooped up a chunk of earth and tossed it at a Scottish rival. It fell into the Irish Sea, forming the Isle of Man, while the crater left behind filled with water to form Lough Neagh.

=== History ===
In 839, a group of Vikings based a fleet on Lough Neagh, where they wintered during the winter of 840. Before the Tudor conquest of Ireland, the lough had been largely unclaimed by local Gaelic nobles, such as the O'Neill and O'Donnell dynasties. During the reign of Elizabeth I, an Englishman, Sir Hugh Clotworthy, settled near Antrim as part of the Plantation of Ulster and was granted the office of "Captain of Lough Neagh" by the Dublin Castle administration, being paid a stipend in return for maintaining boats on the lough to enforce the Crown's authority. Clotworthy was succeeded in the office by the 1st Viscount Massereene and the 2nd Viscount Massereene. In 1660, Charles II of England gave the 1st Viscount Massereene the rights to the fish and bed of the lough.

During the early 17th century, Sir Arthur Chichester, later created the 1st Baron Chichester, gradually laid claim to Lough Neagh during the Stuart conquest of Ulster, taking advantage of the Flight of the Earls. He first laid claim to the lough's infrastructure, then to its boats, then the shores and finally the lough in its entirety, including all relevant fishing rights. It is possible he did this without James VI and I's approval. The lough was later inherited by Edward, 1st Viscount Chichester, Sir Arthur's younger brother; Edward's descendants later married into the Shaftesbury family. In 2012, it was reported that the 12th Earl of Shaftesbury was considering transferring ownership of the lough to the Northern Ireland Assembly.

In October 2023, Lord Shaftesbury said in an interview that while he was open to selling Lough Neagh to the Northern Irish public, he would not give it away for free. He added: "the sale is one that's borne out of an understanding that my ownership has always been very divisive and quite political and I always get blamed for things that are completely outside of my control. I feel it's often used as an excuse for political inaction and I always want to do the right thing by the people living here and what's in the best interest of the lough."

In February 2024 concerns were raised at the sudden collapse in insect numbers on the Lough and the likely effects this would have on biodiversity in the area.

=== Waterguns phenomenon ===
In his 1937 travelogue The Way That I Went, Irish naturalist Robert Lloyd Praeger described a sonic phenomenon which occurred around or on the lake:

The "Water-guns" of Lough Neagh are another curious local phenomenon. Not infrequently, and according to W. S. Smith (who spent most of his life beside the lake), in all conditions of weather and season, booming sounds are heard–"dull, heavy, explosive sounds"–appearing to come sometimes from this, sometimes from that portion of the lake; but no cause is ever discoverable. Mostly they sound distant and muffled, but sometimes very loud. "When the lake was covered with ice, as it was in February, 1895 [an extremely rare occurrence], on a very calm sunny afternoon," writes Mr Smith, "there were regular boomings at distant intervals, and lasting perhaps a couple of hours," apparently far away in the south-west [..] but the "lough shootings" as the local fishermen call them, occur equally in summer [..] These mysterious sounds seem never to be heard at night.

The BBC noted that these "waterguns" (as the fishermen called them) are "associated with whirlwinds on the surface in sultry weather." A 1931 article in the New York Times noted: "On the shores of Lough Neagh, in Ireland, sounds like gunshots, heard in fine weather, are well known as 'water-guns', explaining that the generic name for the phenomenon at that time was 'brontides', which are 'most often reported over lakes and along seacoasts, though they are also sometimes heard far from any body of water.'" Similar sounds have been reported on Lake Constance in the Alps. (See also: Skyquake)

== Algal bloom crises ==
Lough Neagh underwent catastrophic cyanobacteria or blue green algae bloom events in the summer of 2023 and 2024 which reached international news channels. This has led to numerous local community and environmental organisation responses, such as a mock wake for the lake being held in protest and calls for drastic action to solve the problem. The size of these algal blooms in Lough Neagh has allowed them to be visible from space. They could have significant impacts on the lake's ecology, as the toxins they produce pose a serious risk to wildlife, including birds and fish, risking declines in populations and disrupting the food web. In addition, the growth of the algal blooms depletes oxygen in the water which can cause fish kills. There are also threats to human health from toxins and pathogens detected in the algal mats found in the lake.

Algal blooms have occurred in Lake Neagh prior to the 2023 bloom. In 1902, 1906, and 1913 two studies were done on algae in the lake. They showed that the lake had algal blooms occasionally on sunny days, but that the prevalent algal species was different from what we saw in 2023. Relatively little limnological research was conducted before the 1967 bloom, at the time the largest on record. The historical blooms were biologically significant, but their appearance, dominant organisms, and distribution differed from the surface cyanobacteria blooms observed in 2023, which proved particularly harmful.

The early studies documented substantial phytoplankton populations in Lake Neagh, but the species composition differed from that associated with this recent blue-green cyanobacterial blooms. Battarbee's 1978 work describes Lake Neagh as having undergone cultural eutrophication in two stages, beginning around 1915 and again around 1960. The latter period was associated with changes in diatom communities and increasing productivity. Additionally, there is independent evidence that the lake's algal community in the early 20th century was substantially different from what we see today. The early studies from 1900 - 1910 sampled Lake Neagh's plankton, and later researchers reexamined those samples and found that Stephanodiscus astraea had originally been misidentified as Coscinodiscus lacustris. Additionally, the 1967 bloom was suspended in the water column, whereas the 2023 bloom was in the upper layer of the lake profile at the surface.

These harmful algal blooms have a number factors contributing to their occurrence in Lough Neagh. The foremost contributory factor is the eutrophication of the lake with nutrients like phosphorus and nitrates which have provided suitable conditions for the algae to thrive. The lake has been classified as one of the world's most hyper-eutrophic water-bodies due to chronic eutrophication occurring over many years. Key drivers of this eutrophication are increases in nitrates and phosphates in the lake which are generally attributed to runoff from agriculture in the form of animal slurry residue of chemical fertilizer in addition to human sewage. Research has indicated that 62% of the phosphorus inputs are from agricultural origins, 24% are from wastewater treatment works and 12% are from septic tanks.

This is a satellite-derived distribution of apparent chlorophyll concentrations in Lough Neagh on 14 June 2024 with overlaid landcover data. Three prominent algal bloom areas that occur near the Blackwater, Bann and Maine inflows. The map was produced by Masters of Oceanography student Patrick Hullman at URI Graduate School of Oceanography using Sentinel-2 imagery and publicly available land-cover data.

The Northern Ireland Environment Agency (NIEA) says that an increase in nutrients in the lake due to dumping has likely contributed to the massive blooms. Analysis of Sentinel-2 imagery of Lake Neagh from 14 June 2024 shows three dominant algal bloom locations: The southwestern Blackwater bloom, the northwestern Bann bloom, and the northeastern Maine bloom. Seen here in this map, these three areas represent areas with the highest nutrient concentrations. Cross referenced with landcover data, these algal bloom concentrations are highly associated with urban and/or rangeland local land cover as well as river mouths. Nutrient influx for this bloom event was dominantly caused by nutrient runoff from either industrial or animal waste. While the immediate local runoff associated with these areas strongly contribute to this influx, each of these is also associated with a river mouth flowing into the lake which deposited a great deal of nutrient runoff from other regions in Northern Ireland which are not near to the Neagh coastline.

A number of other environmental factors have contributed to the occurrence of the harmful algal blooms. Climate change has contributed to increasing summer temperatures of, and sunlight intensity on, the lake, creating more suitable conditions for rapid growth of harmful algal blooms. As the lake is relatively shallow with an average depth of 9m, its temperature can increase more rapidly than other deeper lakes, making it more susceptible to algal blooms.

The invasive zebra mussel mollusc species which has invaded the lake has resulted in the lake water having greater clarity and so penetration of light. The increase in light intensity deeper in the water column has increased the chance of harmful algal blooms occurring. The zebra mussel which is a filter feeder on phytoplankton in the lake, will selectively feed on existing phytoplankton species but not on the blue green algae, creating a lower ecological competition scenario for these algae.

When the algal bloom crisis of 2023 occurred, the Northern Ireland Assembly was suspended and Northern Ireland had no functioning devolved government. The Social Democratic and Labour Party MLA Matthew O'Toole referred to the state of the lough as "a metaphor for the poisoned state of politics and governance in the North". After the Assembly and Executive were restored in February 2024, all major parties agreed that action was required to address the crisis, and by July 2024 an action plan proposed by the Minister of Agriculture, Environment and Rural Affairs, the Alliance Party's Andrew Muir had been agreed, although some aspects of the plan had to be scaled back due to resistance from the Democratic Unionist Party (DUP), whose support was required for aspects of the action plan that cut across government departments, due to the rules of power-sharing within the Northern Ireland Executive. Despite supporting the action plan, Sinn Féin MLAs voted alongside DUP members in June 2025 to oppose the proposed contents of a new Nutrients Action Programme that Muir's department was consulting on and which was promised by the Lough Neagh action plan.

Some environmental activists have argued that the lough needs to be brought into community ownership and granted rights, inspired by the global rights of nature movement.

== Gallery ==
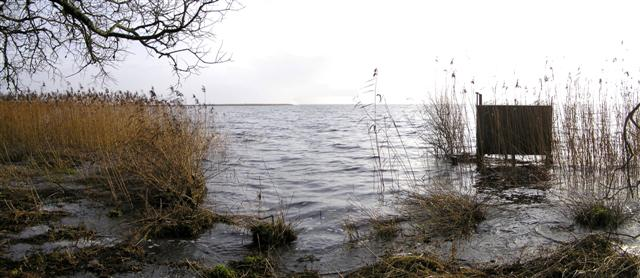
Lough Neagh at Killywoolaghan, County Tyrone

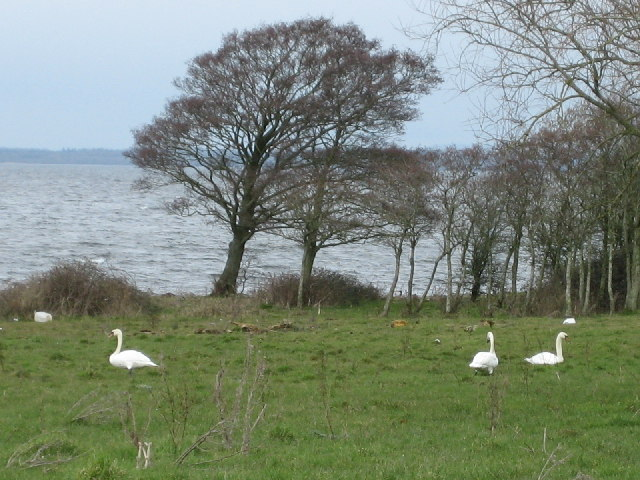
Lough Neagh near Ardmore Point

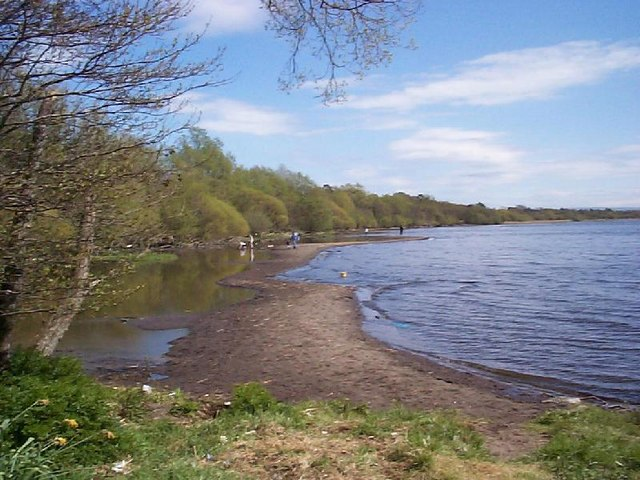
Lough Neagh at Shane's Castle, County Antrim

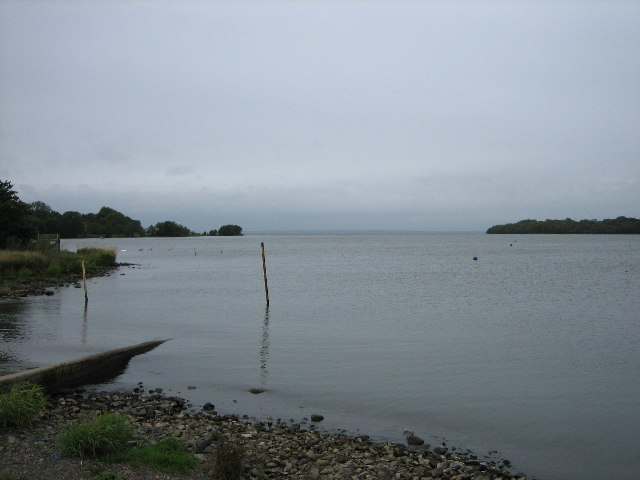
Lough Neagh at Gawley's Gate, County Antrim

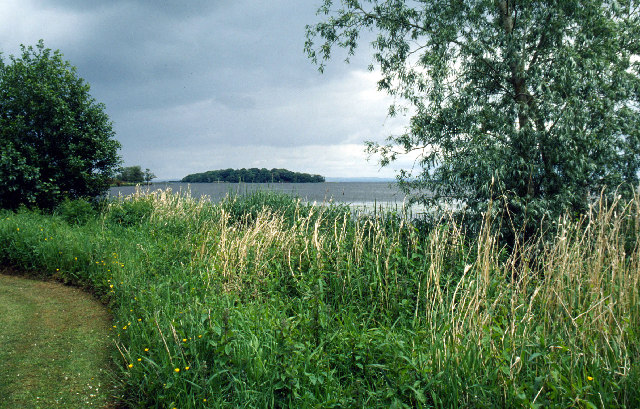
Lough Neagh at Maghery, County Armagh

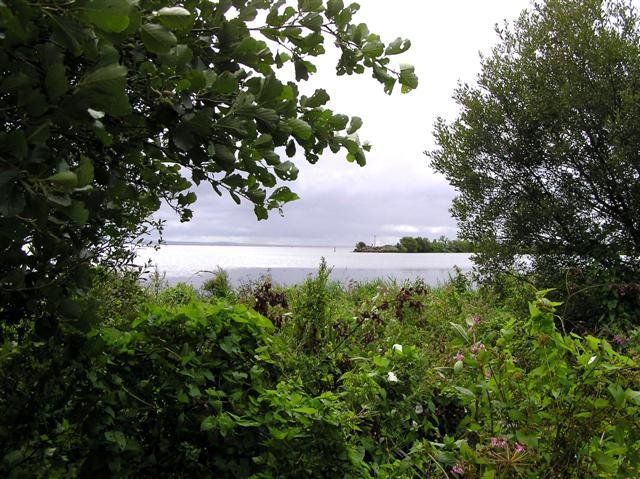
Lough Neagh at Ballyronan, County Londonderry

== See also ==
- List of loughs of Ireland
- List of tourist attractions in Ireland
- Lough Beg
- Portmore Lough
- Lí Ban (mermaid) – another legend about the creation of the Lough
