= Beetling =

Textile finishing method which produces a flat and lustrous effect

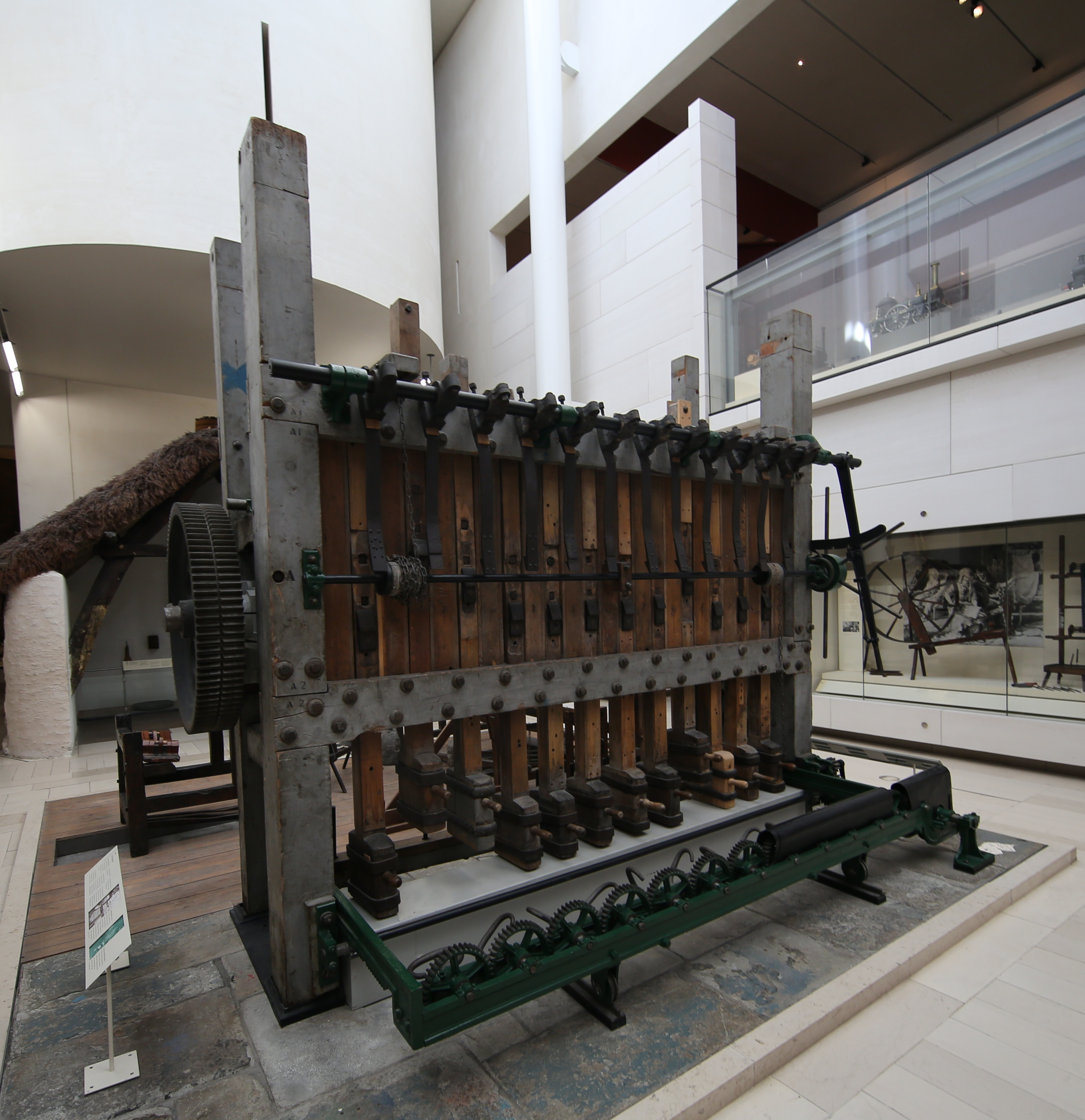
Beetling engine.

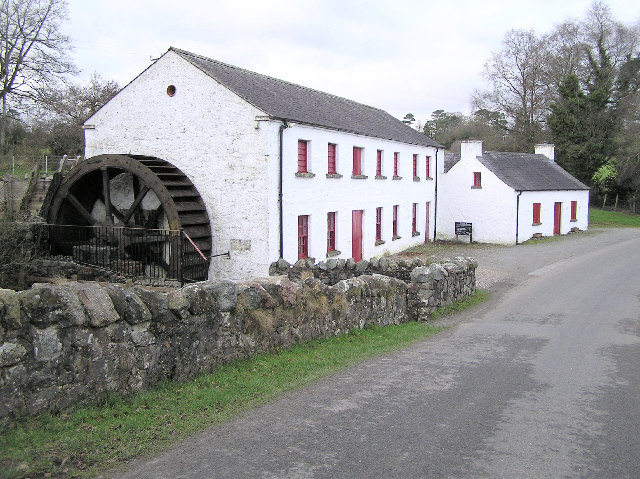
Wellbrook beetling mill in County Tyrone, Northern Ireland.

Beetling is a textile finishing process, where linen or cotton fabric is pounded to produce a flat, lustrous effect.

== Process ==
Beetling is a textile finishing method used to obtain an aesthetic finish (i.e. lustre) in cotton- or linen-based fabrics. The fabric is wetted and treated with potato starch, and then hammers repeatedly rise and fall on exposed fabric for over 100 hours. The finish imparts a lustrous and absorbent effect which is ideal for linen dishcloths. It also changes the texture of the fabric, stiffening it somewhat so that it is similar to leather.

== History ==
Within Ireland, beetling was first introduced by Hamilton Maxwell in 1725. Beetling is part of the finishing of the linen cloth. The hammering tightens the weave and gives the cloth a smooth feel. The process was gradually phased out, in lieu of calendering. One similarity between beetling and calendering is the compression; however, with calendering, the finish does not remain for the life of the cloth, which distinguishes it from beetling.

=== Beetling mill ===
William Clark and Sons, based in Upperlands, Northern Ireland, are the last commercial beetling mill in the world and have been beetling on the same site since 1736.

=== 21st century ===
In the 2020s, there was a surge of interest in beetled fabric, largely due to a 2020 Alexander McQueen collection focused on beetled linen.

== Culture ==
The beating of indigo dyed fabrics is used in several Muslim majority cultures. In North Africa, the tagelmust is commonly made of beetled fabric, and Egyptian women's dresses used to be made of beetled fabric as well. Yemenis also beetled fabric for women's clothes. Though no longer used in Egypt, this practice lives on in the preference for shiny fabrics among many Egyptian women.

== See also ==
- Fulling
