= Groggan =

Hamlet in County Antrim, Northern Ireland

Coordinates: 54.786°N 6.367°W

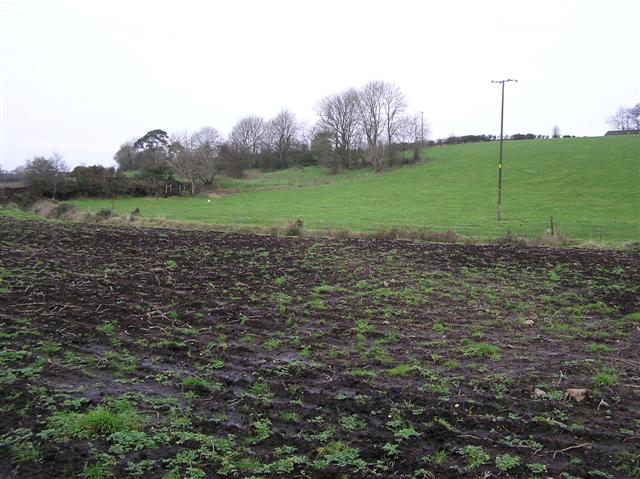
Groggan townland in 2007

Groggan (from Irish an Grógán) is a hamlet and townland near Randalstown in County Antrim, Northern Ireland. It is situated in the historic barony of Toome Upper and the civil parish of Drummaul and covers an area of 620 acres. It is within the Borough of Antrim.

The townland is around 5 kilometres (3 mi) northwest of Randalstown, and around 10 kilometres (6 mi) southwest of Ballymena.

Groggan had a population of 135 people (54 households) in the 2011 census. The population of the townland declined overall during the 19th century:

Year	1841	1851	1861	1871	1881	1891
Population	255	294	333	334	247	209
Houses	47	53	59	59	47	46

== See also ==
- List of townlands in County Antrim
