= Cookstown railway station =

Railway station in Northern Ireland

Cookstown
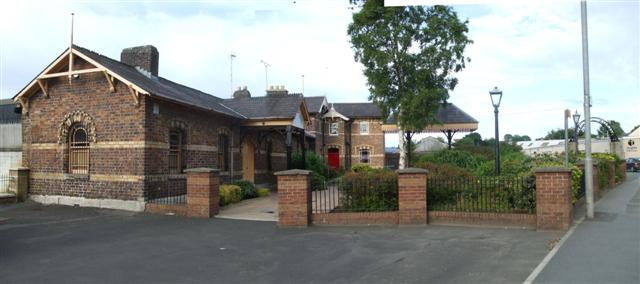
- Cookstown railway station in 2008

General information
- Location: Molesworth Street, Cookstown; County Tyrone; Northern Ireland
- Coordinates: 54.6452°N 6.7403°W
- Platforms: 2

Construction
- Architect: William Henry Mills

History
- Original company: Great Northern Railway
- Post-grouping: Great Northern Railway

Key dates
- 28 August 1879: Station opened
- 16 January 1956: Station closed to passengers
- 5 October 1959: Station closed to goods
Location

Cookstown railway station was one of two railway stations serving the town of Cookstown in County Tyrone, Northern Ireland.

== History ==
The Great Northern Railway opened the station on 28 August 1879 as the terminus of a branch from Dungannon.

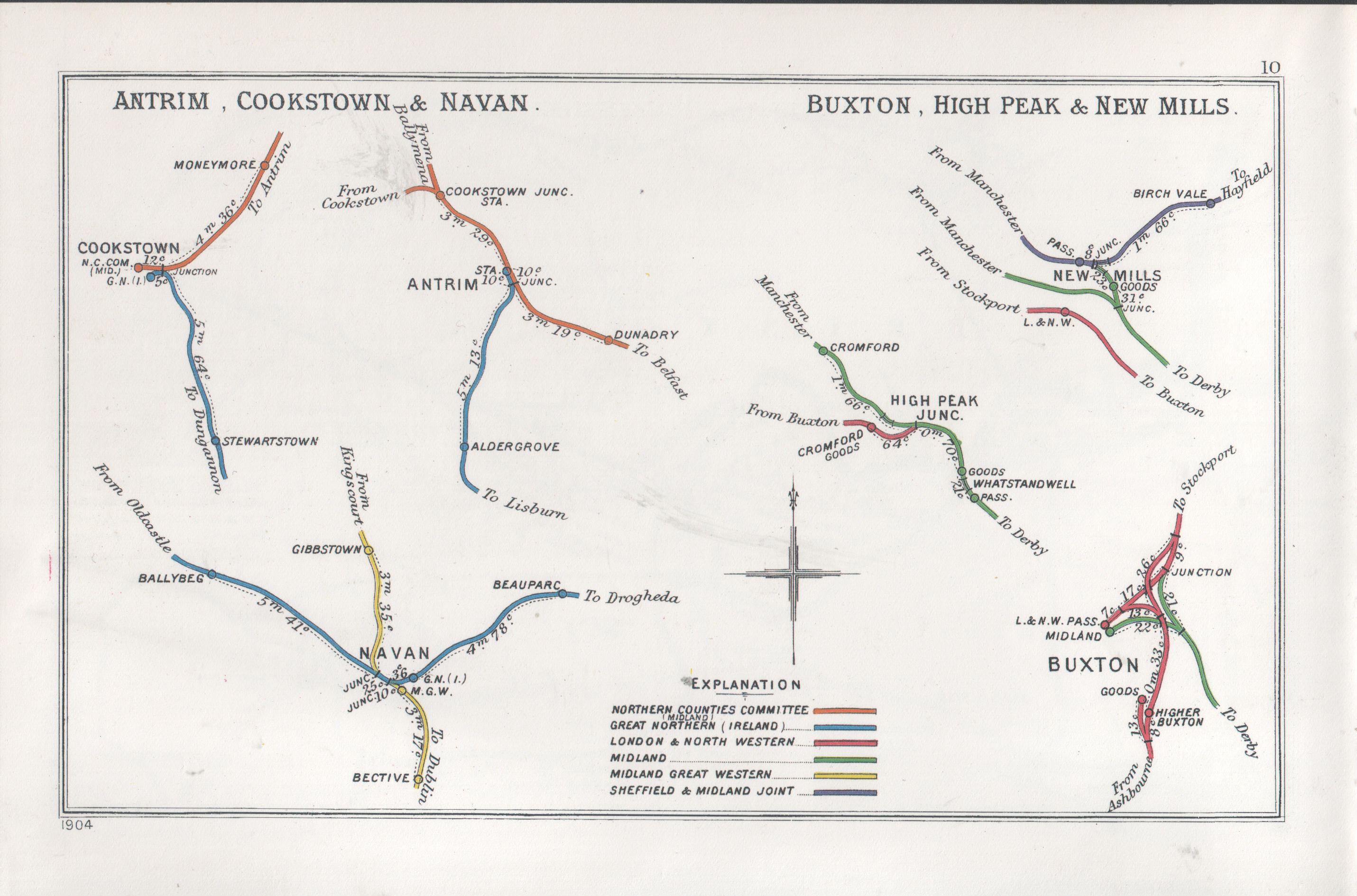
A 1904 Railway Clearing House Junction Diagram showing (top left) railways in the vicinity of Cookstown

The GNR was the second railway company to reach Cookstown - the first being the Belfast and Ballymena Railway in 1856, after they opened a branch line to the town by way of Randalstown and Magherafelt. Though located next door to the BBR station on Molesworth Street, the GNR station was completely separate. A rail connection between the two stations existed, but for transfer of goods wagons only. There were no through passenger workings.

It was closed to passengers by the Great Northern Railway Board on 16 January 1956 and to goods on 5 October 1959.

The station building was designed by William Henry Mills in his typical polychrome style, with red and yellow Flemish-bond brickwork. After closure it became Council property, and listed in 1975. Today, it is used as by the town's hockey club. Two further GNR railway buildings survive in Cookstown, along with the goods shed (also listed) in use by the Council and a gate archway bearing the name ''Great Northern''. The arch inspired a similar design at the Downpatrick and County Down Railway.

== Routes ==
| Preceding station | Disused railways | Following station |
|---|---|---|
| Stewartstown | Great Northern Railway; Dungannon - Cookstown | Terminus |
| Cookstown (NCC) | Northern Counties Committee; Goods Wagons Only | Terminus |
