= Moneymore railway station =

Disused railway station in Northern Ireland

Moneymore

General information
- Location: Station Road, Moneymore, County Londonderry; Northern Ireland
- Coordinates: 54.6977°N 6.6726°W
- Platforms: 2

Construction
- Architect: Charles Lanyon

Other information
- Status: Disused

History
- Original company: Belfast and Ballymena Railway
- Pre-grouping: Belfast and Northern Counties Railway
- Post-grouping: Belfast and Northern Counties Railway

Key dates
- 10 November 1856: Station opens
- 28 August 1950: Station closes to passengers
- 2 May 1955: Station closes to goods
Location

Moneymore railway station in Moneymore, County Londonderry, was on an extension of the Belfast and Ballymena Railway which ran from Cookstown Junction in County Antrim to Cookstown in County Tyrone in Northern Ireland.

== History ==
The station was opened by the Belfast and Ballymena Railway on 10 November 1856 when they extended their Randalstown branch line to Cookstown. In 1860 the BBR became the Belfast and Northern Counties Railway (BNCR), which would go on to be absorbed by the Midland Railway in 1903, becoming the Northern Counties Committee (NCC). The station buildings were designed by the architect Charles Lanyon.

It was closed to passengers by the Ulster Transport Authority on 28 August 1950 and to goods on 2 May 1955.

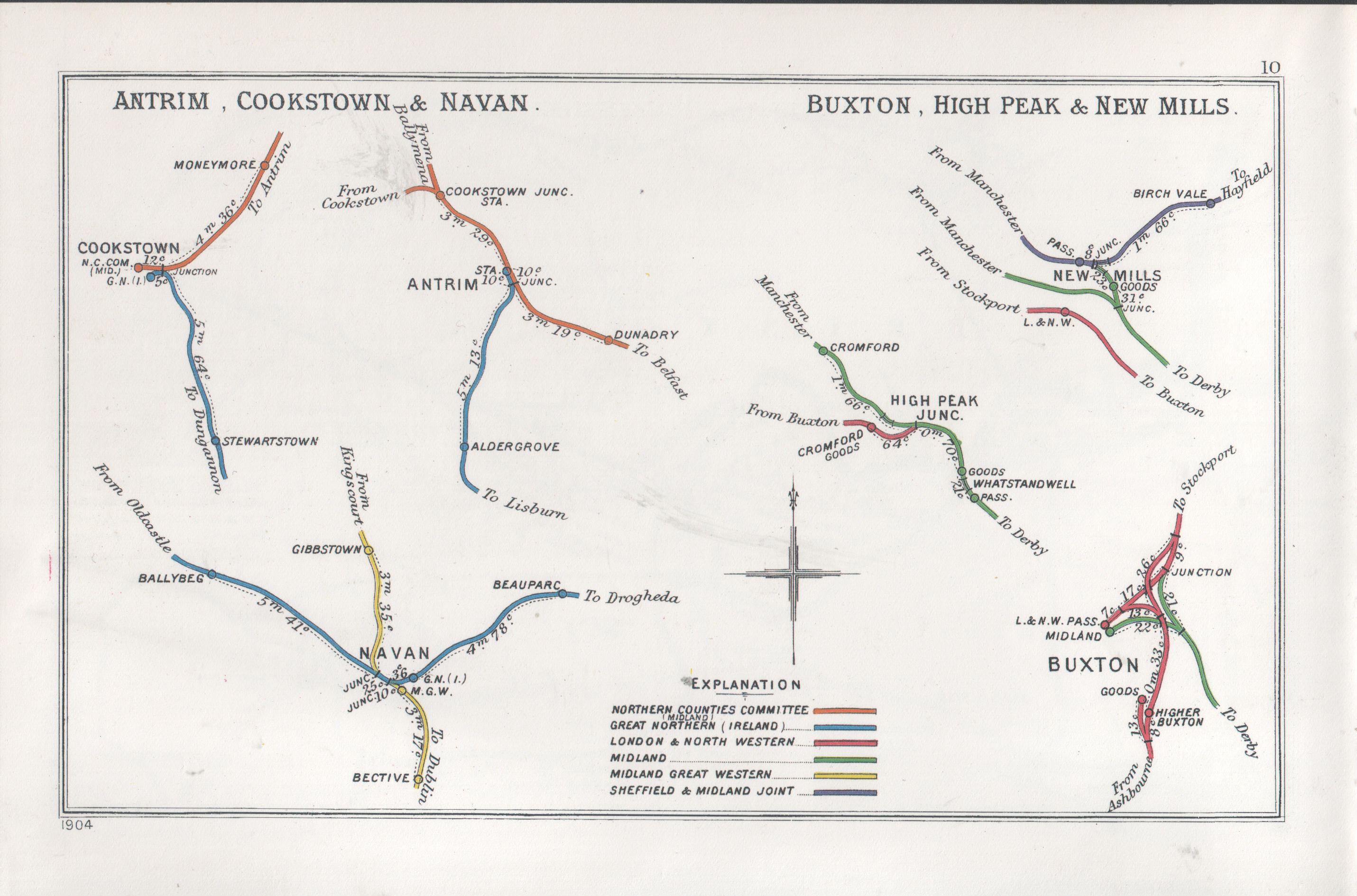
A 1904 Railway Clearing House Junction Diagram showing (top left) railways in the vicinity of Moneymore

== Routes ==
Preceding station	Historical railways	Following station
Magherafelt	Belfast and Ballymena Railway; Cookstown branch line	Cookstown
