= Staffordstown railway station =

Railway station in County Antrim, Northern Ireland

Staffordstown

General information
- Location: Portlee Road; Staffordstown, County Antrim; Northern Ireland
- Coordinates: 54.7122°N 6.4033°W

Other information
- Status: Disused

History
- Original company: Belfast and Ballymena Railway
- Pre-grouping: Belfast and Northern Counties Railway
- Post-grouping: Belfast and Northern Counties Railway

Key dates
- 10 November 1856: Station opens
- 1 March 1864: Station closes to passengers
- 1 June 1902: Station reopens
- 1933: Unstaffed halt
- 28 August 1950: Station closes
Location

Staffordstown railway station was on the Belfast and Ballymena Railway which ran from Cookstown Junction to Cookstown in Northern Ireland. It was located on the Ballynamullan Road in the townland of Ballynamullan, Cargin, near Toome.

== History ==
The station was opened by the Belfast and Ballymena Railway on 10 November 1856.

The station closed to passengers on 28 August 1950.

Preceding station	Historical railways	Following station
Randalstown	Belfast and Ballymena Railway; Cookstown Junction-Cookstown	Toome Bridge
