= Kells Water =

River in County Antrim, Northern Ireland

Coordinates: 54.812°N 6.299°W

The Kells Water is a small river in County Antrim, Northern Ireland. It flows through Moorfields and Kells and is a tributary to the River Maine. The river rises above Glenwherry. It is a continuation of the Glenwhirry River and eventually joins the Maine, which in turn flows into Lough Neagh. The hamlet of Kellswater is nearby. An old stone bridge crosses the Kells Water, separating Kells from the adjacent village of Connor.

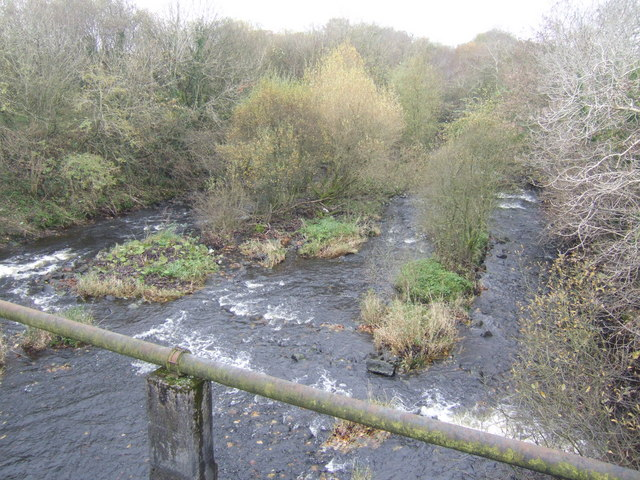
Kells Water

== History ==
The river was widely used to power linen and other mills in the past. The water is still used in some industrial processes, such as in a dye works near Connor.

== Angling ==
The Kells Water is a nursery river, which salmon, trout and dollaghan use to spawn in November and December.

== Cultural reference ==
Kellswater Flute Band was founded in 1947, four miles south of Ballymena in the town land of Tullynamullan. The band takes its name from the river, celebrated in the folksong Bonnie Kellswater, with the river and the bridge featuring on the band crest.

== See also ==
- List of rivers of Ireland
