= Church Lads' and Church Girls' Brigade =

Anglican youth organization

- Formation: 1891
- Headquarters: Wath-upon-Dearne, Rotherham, Yorkshire, England
- Key people: The Archbishop of Canterbury (President)
- Website: www.clcgb.org.uk

The Church Lads' and Church Girls' Brigade is an Anglican youth organisation with branches in the United Kingdom, Ireland, Bermuda, Kenya, South Africa, Barbados, Newfoundland and St Helena. Its origins lie in the formation in 1891 of the Church Lads' Brigade with its sister organisation, the Church Red Cross Brigade, later the Church Girls' Brigade, founded in 1901. The two respective founders were Walter M. Gee and the Reverend Thomas Milner. The two brigades amalgamated in 1978 to form the Church Lads' and Church Girls' Brigade.

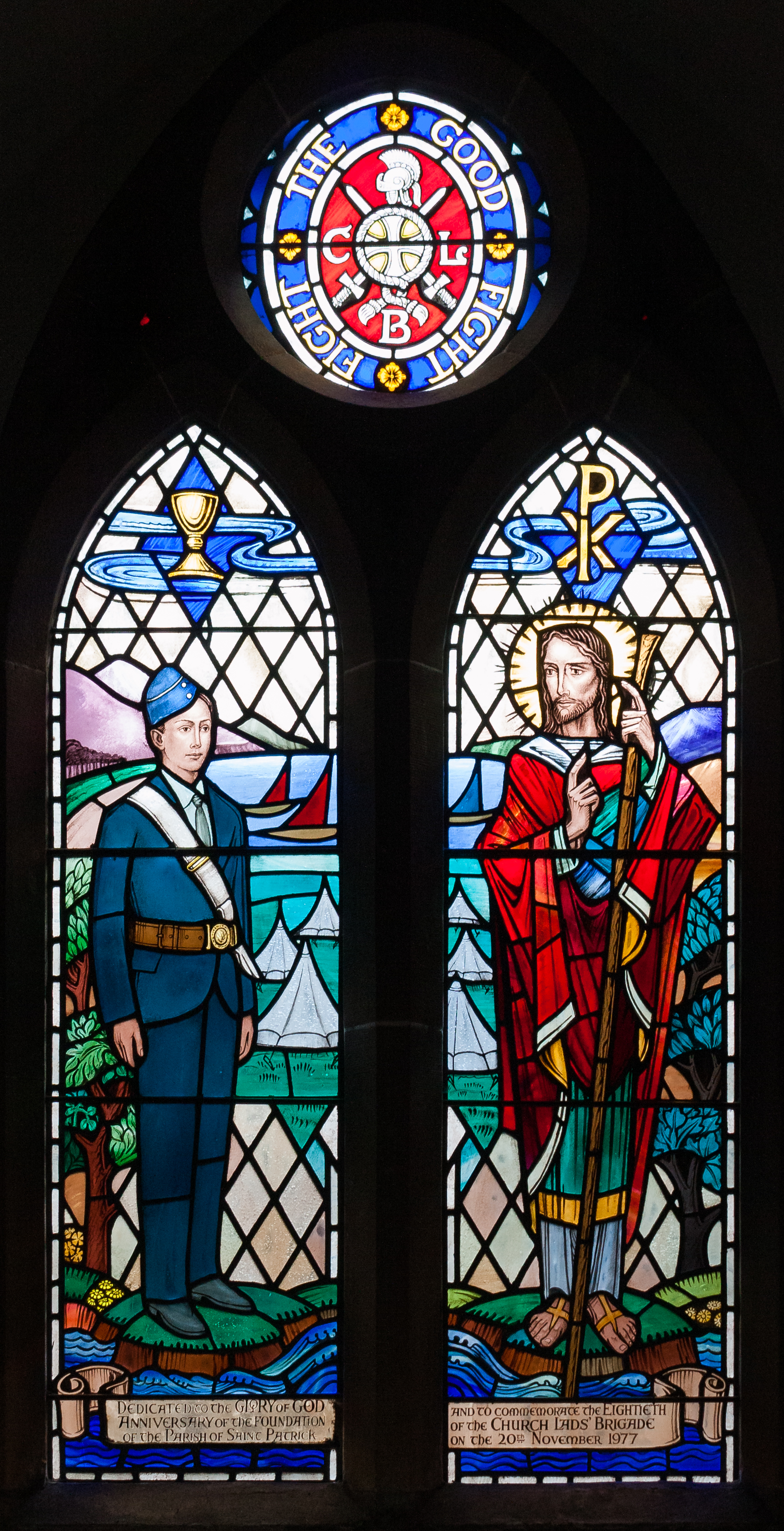
St Patrick's Church, Ballymena, Northern Ireland: stained glass window depicting a Church Lads' Brigade member and Jesus, with "Fight the Good Fight" (1 Tim 6:12) quoted in the round window at top.

The Church Lads' Brigade was one of the founding members of The National Council for Voluntary Youth Services (NCVYS), and the Church Lads' and Church Girls' Brigade remains a member for their work on development of young people.

The brigade's patron saint is Martin of Tours. A banner depicting St Martin, which was presented by the brigade in 1921 to honour those members who died in the First World War, is kept at Westminster Abbey.

== Structure ==
The brigade is structured by location. Each location (typically a diocese) has a regiment or a diocesan battalion, this then divides into battalions (South, Central, North East – Durham, Oldham, Rochdale, Bolton, and Tameside) and then into companies. Generally, each regiment has more than one battalion, and each battalion has more than one company.

In Newfoundland, the brigade is composed of the Eastern Diocesan Regiment, split between the Avalon Battalion and the Trinity-Conception Battalion. Those battalions are further split into companies. The brigade has seen a decrease in membership, and many companies have now become defunct.

During the First World War, the Church Lads' Brigade was involved in the creation of the Newfoundland Regiment and the 16th (Service) Battalion (Church Lads' Brigade), King's Royal Rifle Corps, among other.

It shares material with the Archives of the Newfoundland Church Lads’ Brigade. Membership receives an opportunity to have Brigader magazine twice a year, the Newfoundland CLB Bugle and offers of merchandise.

== Sections ==
The brigade is split into groups. These correspond with the age of the members:

- The Martins (named after the patron saint): 4 to 7 years of age.
- The Y Team (previously YB & YGC: Young Boys and Young Girls Corp): 7 to 10 years of age.
- JTC (Jump To The Challenge (previously Junior Training Corps)): 10 to 13 years of age.
- Seniors: 13 to 21 years of age.
- Staff: 18 years onwards.

Members can become leaders and staff.

The following are the section designations for the CLB in Newfoundland:

- LTC (Little Training Corps. Previously LBC: Little Boys Corps): 5 and 6 years of age.
- YTC (Young Training Corps. Previously YBC: Young Boys Corps): 7 to 9 years of age.
- JTC (Junior Training Corps): 10 to 12 years of age.
- SC (Senior Corps.): 13 to 18 years of age.
- Staff: 19 years onwards. Can include commissioned officers or non-uniformed instructors.

== Ranking system ==
=== Newfoundland ===
In Newfoundland, LTC and YTC sections only ever hold the rank of "private". Privates bear no chevrons or sashes. Ranks that merit chevrons wear the chevron on the mid-upper arm, facing downward. Youth ranks that merit Crowns wear them below their elbow. Officer ranks worn it on both sides of the lapel.

==== JTC Section ====
- Private
- Junior lance corporal (one chevron, on the right arm only)
- Junior corporal (two chevrons, on the right arm only)

Jr/L/Cpl and Jr/Cpl are considered "junior" non-commissioned officers (NCOs)

==== Senior Section ====
- Private
- Lance corporal (one chevron on each arm)
- Corporal (two chevrons on each arm)
- Lance sergeant (three chevrons on each arm; an N.C.O. Proficiency course is required to achieve this rank)
- Sergeant (three chevrons and a green sash with a button emblazoned with the C.L.B. crest)

Lance corporal to sergeant are NCOs, while WO2s and WO1s are warrant officers.

- Warrant officer, second class (two crowns, one on each arm, a red sash, and a drill cane)

Many that hold this rank also hold the position of "sergeant major". The rank is often shortened to 'WO2' when addressing someone of this rank. A W.O. proficiency course, along with having been a sergeant for at least one year and being over the age of 17, is required to achieve this rank.

- Warrant officer, first class (two crowns, one on each arm, and a drill cane)

Those who are awarded this rank also hold the position of "battalion sergeant major". This rank can take on both the attributes of a senior section member or those of an officer, but wear an officer's uniform.
After achieving a warrant officer rank, members who move into the ranks of officers are given the privilege of skipping the "officer candidate" stage.

==== Officer ranks ====
- Officer candidate

Often referred to as an 'O.C.' when being addressed, an O.C. is someone who has not yet completed officer proficiency and achieved the status of a full commissioned officer. They do not wear any sign of rank.

- Second lieutenant (one pip on each lapel)
- First lieutenant (two pips on each lapel)
- Captain (three pips on each lapel)
- Major (a crown on each lapel)

Those who achieve the rank of major are usually on battalion, or regimental staff. Battalion commanders hold the rank of major.

- Lieutenant colonel (one pip and a crown on each lapel)

The regimental commander holds the rank of lieutenant colonel.

- Colonel (a pip, a crown, and another pip on each lapel)

The current (and past) governor and commandant holds the rank of colonel.

== Activities ==
=== Company night ===
Members will arrive and be instructed; subs will be taken before moving onto badgework. The members are then instructed to fall in and perform drills before moving onto games. Lastly, the Brigade Prayer is said before any notices are given out.

=== Badgework ===
Badgework can take place in several different forms. The brigade has Christian teachings. Many companies have been known to award The Duke of Edinburgh's Award.

=== Drill ===
Many companies have a parade one Sunday a month; all members are required to attend a family service in church before parading. By the time members reach JTC, the older members are encouraged to take turns commanding drill.

=== Camp ===
There are national camps available, one being a trip to Butlins and another being 'spring adventure' (the location varies); these are both early in the year. Many brigade companies choose to take their members on expeditions, sometimes working towards their Duke of Edinburgh's Award.

In Newfoundland, week-long summer camps are offered for members of the JTC and SC sections, while in the fall and winter, weekend hiking and survival camps, known as "Challenge Camps" are held for members of the Senior Corps only.

=== Sports ===
Members are encouraged to get involved in a number of sports. Some of these sports are used as competitions between battalions and then between regiments.

Each February, battalions are invited to take part in a unihoc contest. The different companies stay at Butlins, in Skegness, for 2 or 3 nights.

=== Band ===
Many brigade companies in the United Kingdom also have a marching band with instruments such as drums, bugles, cymbals and glockenspiels. Several bands also run brass and woodwind bands.

Many battalions and regiments run their own band competitions for their members; there is also a National Band Competition for the bands to compete in which takes place annually around May, within which many of the brigade companies take part nationally. In Newfoundland, each battalion has its own marching band, such as the Regimental Band.

==== Music played ====
Historically, many companies have had a large bugle section, therefore choosing to play bugle marches such as Assam Rifles (Winter), The Little Bugler (Duthoit) and Mechanised Infantry (McBain). The woodwind section will play other marches, such as Aces High.

== National Band ==
To support individual companies, the CLCGB runs a National Band, giving the members an opportunity to play in a band of over 60 members. The band plays across Britain, Europe and New York on summer tours. The band plays a variety of music, having a brass and woodwind section with traditional drum corps, bugle corps and mallet sections.

== National Choir ==
The brigade has a National Choir. Formed in 1991, the choir welcomes members from all regions in which the brigade operates and provides the opportunity for members to sing. It supports brigade events and performs three concerts in the autumn of each year. It has also played a role in the brigade's annual service of remembrance held each November in the chapel of the National Memorial Arboretum at Alrewas, Staffordshire. The membership of the choir went from about 25 to 50.

== Brigade prayer ==
Members are encouraged to pray at least once every night. This prayer is the standard brigade prayer.

Heavenly Father, bless and guide with your spirit the work of the Church Lads' and Church Girls' Brigade. Help us never be ashamed to confess the faith of Christ crucified. To fight valiantly under his banner against sin, the world and the devil, and to continue as his faithful soldiers and servants to the end of our lives. Amen.

Some companies, such as St James Brightlingsea in Essex, will say Grace at the end of the Brigade Prayer.

The grace of our Lord Jesus Christ, and the love of God, and the fellowship of the Holy Spirit be with us all, evermore. Amen.

An alternate version of the Brigade Prayer is used in Newfoundland. The prayer is usually said at the beginning of a parade night, while the Grace is generally said at the end:

Grant O God, That we may never be ashamed to confess the faith of Christ crucified, and to faithfully fight under his banner against sin, the world, and the devil; to continue as his faithful soldiers and servants, unto our lives end. Through the same Jesus Christ our Lord, Amen.

== Cultural references ==
The CLB is mentioned in the traditional Newfoundland song Recruiting Sargeant, which honours the Royal Newfoundland Regiment. The ballad was popularized in 1997 when it was covered by the Canadian folk rock band Great Big Sea.
