= Castledawson railway station =

Railway station in Northern Ireland

Castledawson

General information
- Location: Annaghmore Road; Castledawson, County Londonderry; Northern Ireland
- Coordinates: 54.7758°N 6.5585°W

Other information
- Status: Disused

History
- Original company: Belfast and Ballymena Railway
- Pre-grouping: Belfast and Northern Counties Railway
- Post-grouping: Northern Counties Committee

Key dates
- 10 November 1856: Station opens
- 28 August 1950: Station closes to passengers
- 1 October 1959: Station closes to goods
Location

Castledawson railway station was on the Belfast and Ballymena Railway Cookstown branch line, which ran from Cookstown Junction to Cookstown in Northern Ireland.

== History ==
The station was opened by the Belfast and Ballymena Railway on 10 November 1856. The station buildings were designed by the architect Charles Lanyon.

The line was closed to passengers by the Ulster Transport Authority on 28 August 1950 and to goods on 1 October 1959.

== Routes ==
Preceding station	Historical railways	Following station
Toome Bridge	Belfast and Ballymena Railway; Cookstown Junction-Cookstown	Magherafelt
