= Magherafelt railway station =

Railway station in County Londonderry, Northern Ireland

Magherafelt

General information
- Location: Station Road, Magherafelt, County Londonderry; Northern Ireland
- Coordinates: 54.7606°N 6.6050°W
- Platforms: 2

Construction
- Architect: Charles Lanyon

Other information
- Status: Disused

History
- Original company: Belfast and Ballymena Railway; Derry Central Railway; Draperstown Railway
- Pre-grouping: Belfast and Northern Counties Railway
- Post-grouping: Northern Counties Committee

Key dates
- 10 November 1856: Station opens
- 28 August 1950: Station closes to passengers
- 1 October 1959: Station closes to goods
Location

Magherafelt railway station was on the Belfast and Ballymena Railway which ran from Cookstown Junction to Cookstown in Northern Ireland.

== History ==
The station was opened by the Belfast and Ballymena Railway on 10 November 1856 when they extended their Randalstown branch line to Cookstown. In 1860 the BBR became the Belfast and Northern Counties Railway (BNCR), which would go on to be absorbed by the Midland Railway in 1903, becoming the Northern Counties Committee (NCC). The station buildings were designed by the architect Charles Lanyon.

It was closed to passengers by the Ulster Transport Authority on 28 August 1950 and to goods on 1 October 1959.

== Routes ==
Preceding station	Historical railways	Following station
Castledawson	Belfast and Ballymena Railway; Cookstown branch line	Moneymore
Terminus	Derry Central Railway	Knockloughrim
Terminus	Draperstown Railway	Desertmartin
