= River Main (County Antrim) =

Coordinates: 54.831225°N 6.300341°W

River Main River Maine
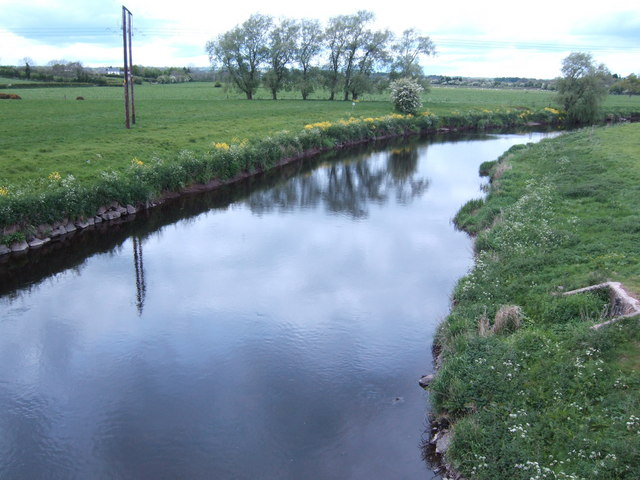
- River Main viewed upstream from the Slaght Bridge
- Etymology: From Abhainn Mhaighin, "river of the plain"
- Native name: An Mhean (Irish)

Location
- Country: Northern Ireland
- Cities: Ballymena, Randalstown, Cullybackey

Physical characteristics
- Source
  - location: Glenariff
- Mouth
  - location: North Channel via Lough Neagh and Lower Bann
- Length: 55 km (34 mi)
- Discharge
  - average: 15.4 m^{3}/s (540 cu ft/s)

Basin features
- River system: Bann
- Tributaries
  - left: Kellswater, Braid River

The River Main or Maine (Irish: An Mhean) is a river in Northern Ireland, flowing through County Antrim.

Former prime minister of Northern Ireland Terence O'Neill took the title "Baron O'Neill of the Maine" when he was made a life peer.

== Course ==
The River Maine rises in the Glens of Antrim, flowing through Cullybackey and Randalstown before entering Lough Neagh.

== Wildlife ==
The River Maine is a noted salmon and trout fishery.

== See also ==
- Rivers of Ireland
