= Aghaboy, County Antrim =

Townland in County Antrim, Northern Ireland

Coordinates: 54.7762°N 6.3304°W

Aghaboy
- Location within Northern Ireland
- County: County Antrim
- Country: Northern Ireland
- Sovereign state: United Kingdom
- Police: Northern Ireland
- Fire: Northern Ireland
- Ambulance: Northern Ireland

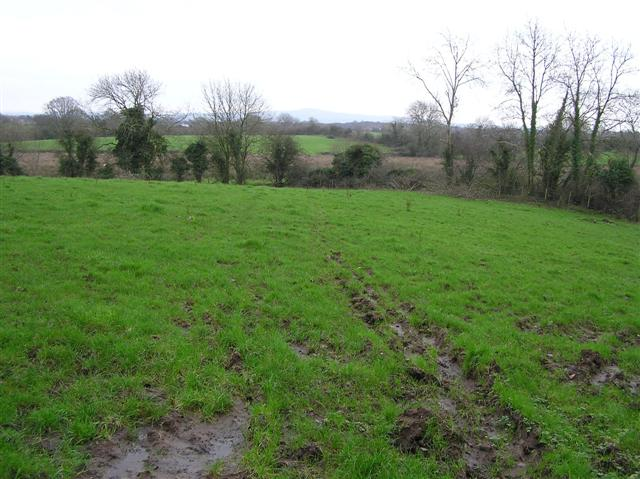
Aghaboy townland in 2007

Aghaboy is a townland in County Antrim, Northern Ireland. It is situated in the historic barony of Toome Upper and the civil parish of Drummaul and covers an area of 286 acres It is 2 miles (3 km) north of Randalstown.

The name derives from the Irish: Achadh Bui (yellow field).

The population of the townland decreased during the 19th century:

Year	1841	1851	1861	1871	1881	1891
Population	150	107	130	118	131	76
Houses	26	23	25	22	24	17

The decrease in population between 1881 and 1891 was attributed to emigration and removals.

== See also ==
- List of townlands in County Antrim
