= Leitrim =

Leitrim may refer to:

== Places ==
=== Ireland ===
- County Leitrim
- Leitrim, County Leitrim, a village in County Leitrim
- Leitrim (County Leitrim barony), a barony in County Leitrim
- Leitrim (Counties Galway and Clare barony), a barony mainly in County Galway and partly in County Clare
- Leitrim Station, a former railway station on the defunct Cavan & Leitrim Railway

=== Northern Ireland ===
- Leitrim, County Antrim, a townland in County Antrim, Northern Ireland
- Leitrim, County Down, a small village in County Down, Northern Ireland
- Leitrim, County Fermanagh, a townland in County Fermanagh, Northern Ireland
- Leitrim, County Londonderry, a townland in County Londonderry, Northern Ireland
- Leitrim, County Tyrone, a townland in County Tyrone, Northern Ireland

=== Canada ===
- Leitrim, Ontario, a residential neighbourhood near Ottawa
  - Leitrim station, an LRT station in Ottawa, Ontario, Canada
- CFS Leitrim, a Canadian military base located in the same neighbourhood

== Sport ==
=== Gaelic games ===
- Leitrim GAA, one of the 32 Gaelic Athletic Association counties
- Liatroim Fontenoys GAC, Gaelic club located in the village of Leitrim, County Down

== Constituencies ==
=== Before 1801 ===
- County Leitrim (Parliament of Ireland constituency)

=== 1801–1885 ===
- County Leitrim (UK Parliament constituency)

=== 1885–1918 ===
- North Leitrim
- South Leitrim

=== 1918–1921 ===
- County Leitrim (UK Parliament constituency)

=== 1921–1923 ===
- Leitrim–Roscommon North

=== 1923–1937 ===
- Leitrim–Sligo

=== 1937–1948 ===
- Leitrim (Dáil constituency)

=== 1948–1969 ===
- Sligo–Leitrim

=== 1969–1977 ===
- Donegal–Leitrim
- Roscommon–Leitrim
- Sligo–Leitrim

=== 1977–1981 ===
- Roscommon–Leitrim
- Sligo–Leitrim

=== 1981–2007, 2016–present ===
- Sligo–Leitrim

=== 2007–2016 ===
- Roscommon–South Leitrim
- Sligo–North Leitrim
