= Andraid railway station =

Railway station in County Antrim, Northern Ireland

Andraid

General information
- Location: Andraid, County Antrim; Northern Ireland
- Coordinates: 54.8111°N 6.2986°W

Other information
- Status: Disused

History
- Original company: Belfast and Ballymena Railway
- Pre-grouping: Belfast and Northern Counties Railway
- Post-grouping: Belfast and Northern Counties Railway

Key dates
- 11 April 1848: Station opens
- 1 April 1850: Station closes
Location

Andraid railway station was on the Belfast and Ballymena Railway which ran from Belfast to Ballymena in Northern Ireland.

== History ==
The station was opened by the Belfast and Ballymena Railway on 11 April 1848.

The station closed to passengers on 1 April 1850.

| Preceding station | Historical railways | Following station |
|---|---|---|
| Kellswater; Line open, station closed | Belfast and Ballymena Railway; Belfast York Road-Ballymena | Ballymena; Line and station open |
