= Aghaloughan (disambiguation) =

Aghaloughan is the name of several townlands in the island of Ireland. Its name derives from the Irish Achadh an Locháin, meaning "field of the lake".

- Aghaloughan, a townland in County Antrim, Northern Ireland
- A townland in County Cavan, Republic of Ireland; see List of townlands of County Cavan
- A townland in County Longford, Republic of Ireland; see List of townlands of County Longford
- A townland in County Monaghan, Republic of Ireland; see List of townlands of County Monaghan
