= Aghaloughan =

Townland in County Antrim, Northern Ireland

Coordinates: 54.734312°N 6.358962°W

Aghaloughan: Irish: Achadh an Locháin
- County: County Antrim
- Country: Northern Ireland
- Sovereign state: United Kingdom
- Police: Northern Ireland
- Fire: Northern Ireland
- Ambulance: Northern Ireland

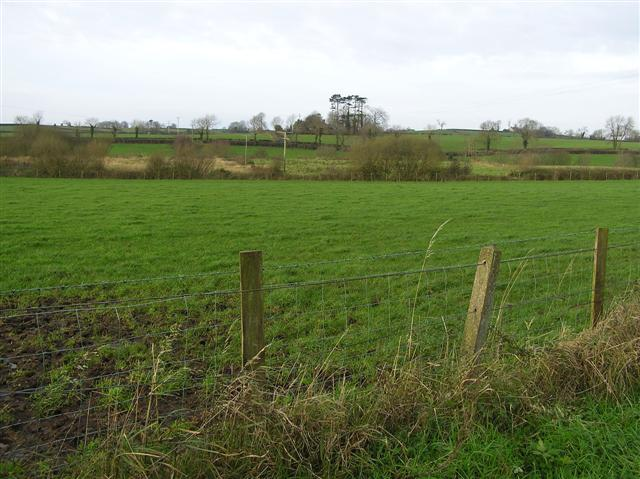
Aghaloughan townland in 2007

Aghaloughan (from Irish Achadh an Locháin, meaning 'field of the lake') is a townland in County Antrim, Northern Ireland. It is situated in the historic barony of Toome Upper and the civil parish of Drummaul and covers an area of 286 acres It is around 2 miles (3 km) south-west of Randalstown.

The population of the townland decreased during the 19th century:

Year	1841	1851	1861	1871	1881	1891
Population	169	160	161	117	105	102
Houses	31	31	32	29	17	18

== See also ==
- List of townlands in County Antrim
