= Toome Bridge railway station =

Former rail facility in Northern Ireland

Toome Bridge
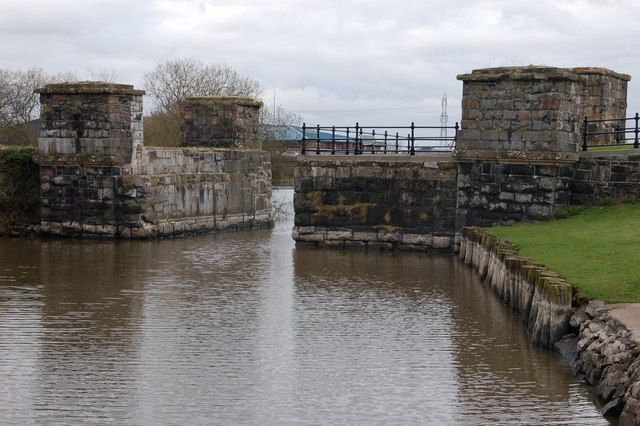
- Spanning time without a span, with the former railway bridge over the River Bann.

General information
- Location: Station Park; Toome, County Antrim; Northern Ireland
- Coordinates: 54.7533°N 6.4615°W

Other information
- Status: Demolished

History
- Original company: Belfast and Ballymena Railway
- Pre-grouping: Belfast and Northern Counties Railway
- Post-grouping: Northern Counties Committee

Key dates
- 10 November 1856: Station opens
- 28 August 1950: Station closes to passengers
- 1 October 1959: Station closes
Location

Toome Bridge railway station was on the Belfast and Ballymena Railway's Cookstown branch line, which ran from Cookstown Junction to Cookstown in Northern Ireland. Located in Toome in County Antrim on the River Bann with County Londonderry across the river.

== History ==
The station was opened by the Belfast and Ballymena Railway on 10 November 1856. The station buildings were designed by the architect Charles Lanyon.

The line was closed to passengers by the Ulster Transport Authority on 28 August 1950 and to goods on 1 October 1959.

== Routes ==
Preceding station	Historical railways	Following station
Staffordstown	Belfast and Ballymena Railway; Cookstown Junction-Cookstown	Castledawson
