= Drummaul =

Civil parish in County Antrim, Northern Ireland

- Country: Northern Ireland
- Sovereign state: United Kingdom
- Police: Northern Ireland
- Fire: Northern Ireland
- Ambulance: Northern Ireland

Drummaul is a townland and civil parish in County Antrim, Northern Ireland. It is situated in the historic barony of Toome Upper and contains the town of Randalstown.

The name derives from the Irish: Druim Mail (Mal's ridge).

== Drummaul parish ==
The parish is bounded by the civil parishes of Duneane, Portglenone, Ahoghill and Braid, and to the south by Lough Neagh. It contains the following 51 townlands:

=== A ===
Aughaboy, Aghaloughan, Andraid, Artresnahan, Aughalish

=== B ===
Ballealy South, Ballydunmaul, Ballygrooby, Ballylurgan, Ballymacilroy, Ballynacraigy, Ballynaleney, Ballytresna, Barnish

=== C ===
Caddy, Clare, Cloghogue, Clonboy, Clonkeen, Coolsythe, Cormorant Rock, Craigmore, Creagh

=== D ===
Downkillybegs, Drumanaway, Drummaul, Drumsough

=== F ===
Farlough, Feehogue

=== G ===
Gortagharn, Groggan

=== K ===
Kilknock, Killyfad

=== L ===
Leitrim, Lenagh, Lisnagreggan, Lurgan West

=== M ===
Magherabeg, Magheralane, Magheramurphy, Mount Shalgus, Muckleramer

=== P ===
Portlee, Procklis

=== R ===
Randalstown

=== S ===
Shane's Castle Park, Sharvogues, Skady Tower

=== T ===
Tamlaght, Tannaghmore, Terrygowan

== Drummaul townland ==
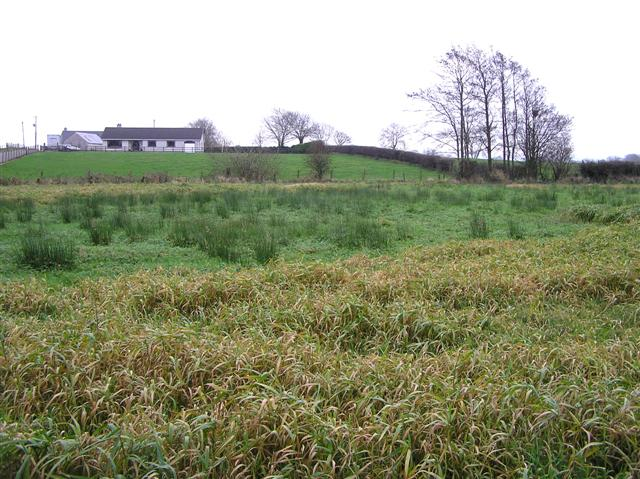
Drummaul townland in 2007

The townland is situated in the historic barony of Toome Upper and the civil parish of Drummaul and covers an area of 339 acres.

The population of the townland decreased during the 19th century:

Year	1841	1851	1861	1871	1881	1891
Population	177	172	170	142	136	112
Houses	29	26	27	30	29	24

== See also ==
- List of civil parishes of County Antrim
- List of townlands in County Antrim
