= Aughalish =

Townland in County Antrim, Northern Ireland

Coordinates: 54°46′37″N 6°16′50″W

- Townland
- Location within Northern Ireland
- County: County Antrim
- Country: Northern Ireland
- Sovereign state: United Kingdom
- Police: Northern Ireland
- Fire: Northern Ireland
- Ambulance: Northern Ireland

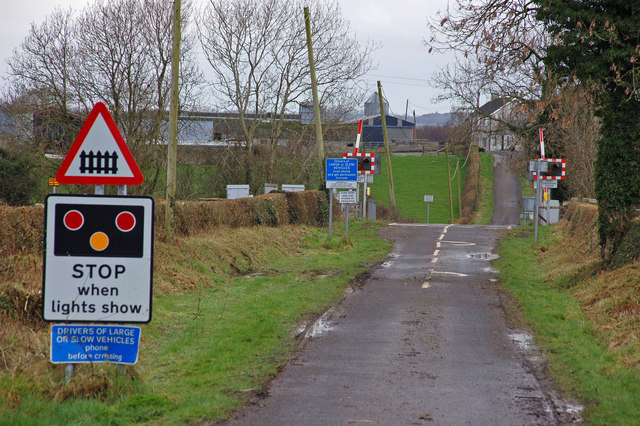
Aughalish in 2007

Aughalish is a townland in County Antrim, Northern Ireland. It is situated in the historic barony of Toome Upper and the civil parish of Drummaul and covers an area of 93 acres.

The name derives from the Irish: Achadh Lis (field of the fort).

The population of the townland decreased during the 19th century:

Year	1841	1851	1861	1871	1881	1891
Population	61	55	53	44	39	35
Houses	9	8	9	7	7	8

== See also ==
- List of townlands in County Antrim
