= Aghaboy =

Aghaboy may refer to several places in Ireland:

- Aghaboy, County Antrim
- Aghaboy, County Monaghan
- Aghaboy, County Tyrone
- Aghaboy (Kinawley), County Cavan
