= Neesy O'Haughan =

Irish outlaw (1691–1720)

- Born: c. 1691; Skerry, County Antrim, Ireland
- Died: 1720 (aged 28–29); Three Rivers Gallows, County Antrim, Ireland
- Cause of death: Executed by Hanging
- Other names: Neesy O'Haughan, Ness O'Haughan, Nessie O'Haughan, Naoise O'Haughan
- Occupation: Highwayman

Naoise O'Haughan (Irish: Naoise Ó hEocháin), also known as Neesy, Ness and Nessie (c. 1691–1720) was a highwayman from Skerry in the valley of the Braid river in County Antrim, Ireland in the early 18th century. He was the eldest of three sons, having two brothers called Shane and Denis.

Although his father originally came from a well-off Catholic farming family, the penal laws introduced during the Protestant Ascendency forbade Catholic ownership of land and so were forced to rent a smaller patch of land near Slemish where they struggled to survive.

During his family's eviction one year, O'Haughan killed his landlord with an axe and became a fugitive and formed an outlaw gang. The wild rolling hills of Antrim - Divis and Black Mountain - provided an ideal environment for O'Haughan. He is said to have hidden in caves at the Hatchet Field on the Black Mountain West of Belfast, before he was captured and hanged at 'The Three Sisters', the gallows green, near Carrickfergus Castle in 1720.
