= Duneane =

Civil parish in County Antrim, Northern Ireland

Duneane or Dún Dá Éan in its Gaelic form, is a civil parish in County Antrim, Northern Ireland. It is situated in the historic barony of Toome Upper and contains the town of Toome.

The name derives from the Irish: Dún Dá Éan (fort of two birds). which came about from a local legend about St Brigid and St Patrick, where St Brigid would build her church on the site of wherever she came upon two blackbirds sitting on a deer's horns.

The parish is bounded by County Londonderry, the civil parishes of Portglenone and Drummaul, and to the south by Lough Neagh. It contains 48 townlands.

There are five churches in the parish, including Sacred Heart Cargin, St Oliver Plunketts Toome, and Our Lady of Lourdes Moneyglass which are Catholic; Duneane Church in Lismacloskey, which is Church of Ireland (and replaced a former Catholic Chapel on the same site); and Duneane Presbyterian Church in Ballylenully.

== Townlands ==
=== A ===
Aghacarnaghan, Alder Rock, Annaghmore, Artlone

=== B ===
Ballycloghan, Ballydonnelly, Ballydugennan, Ballylenully, Ballylurgan, Ballymatoskerty, Ballynacooley, Ballynafey, Ballynamullan, Brockish

=== C ===
Cargin, Cargin Island, Carlane, Carmorn, Cloghogue, Creeve, Creggan

=== D ===
Derrygowan, Derryhollagh, Drumboe, Drumcullen, Drumderg, Drumraymond, Duck Island

=== G ===
Gallagh, Garriffgeery, Gortgarn, Gortgill, Greenan

=== H ===
Harvey's Rock

=== K ===
Killyfast

=== L ===
Lismacloskey

=== M ===
Moneyglass, Moneynick, Moneyrod, Muckrim, Mullaghgaun

=== R ===
Ranaghan

=== S ===
Staffordstown

=== T ===
Tamnaderry, Tamnaghmore, Toome, Tullaghbeg

== People ==
- Henry Cooke (1788–1868) was an Irish presbyterian leader of the early and mid-nineteenth century. His first settlement was at Duneane, where he was ordained on 10 November 1808, though only 20 years old, as assistant to Robert Scott, with a pittance of £25 Irish. Here his evangelical fervour met with no sympathy. and on 13 November 1810 he resigned the post.
- Roddy McCorley (died 1800) fought in Toome, Randalstown and Antrim Town in the United Irishmen Rebellion of 1798 and was hanged by the British at Toome Bridge. A century later, he became the subject of a popular nationalist song by the poet Anna Johnston, who was also known as Ethna Carbery, contained with a collection known as 'The Four Winds of Erin'. McCorley was born in Duneane and a nephew arranged his reburial in Duneane Church graveyard in 1852, though his grave is unmarked as the British smashed his headstone.

== See also ==
- List of civil parishes of County Antrim
