= Cookstown railway station (NCC) =

Railway station in Northern Ireland

Cookstown
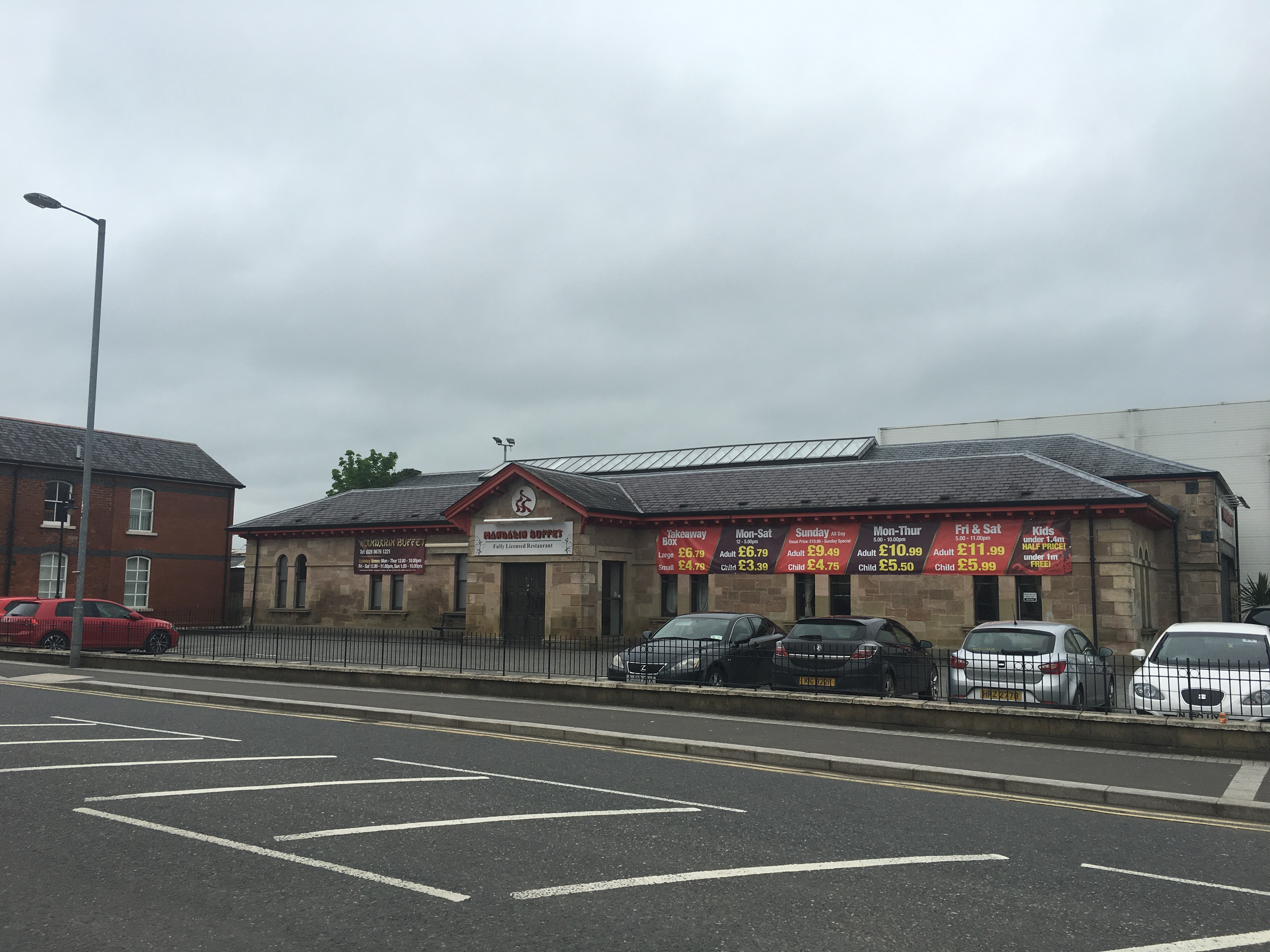
- The former NCC Cookstown station, now the Mandarin Buffet

General information
- Location: Molesworth Street, Cookstown; County Tyrone; Northern Ireland
- Coordinates: 54.646311°N 6.740879°W
- Platforms: 1

Construction
- Architect: Charles Lanyon

History
- Original company: Belfast and Ballymena Railway
- Post-grouping: Northern Counties Committee

Key dates
- 10 November 1856: station opened
- 28 August 1950: station closed to passengers
- 2 May 1955: station closed to goods
Location

Cookstown railway station was one of the two stations serving Cookstown in County Tyrone in Northern Ireland.

== History ==
The Belfast and Ballymena Railway (BBR) opened the station on 10 November 1856 as the terminus of an extension to their existing Randalstown branch line. In 1860 the BBR became the Belfast and Northern Counties Railway (BNCR), which would go on to be absorbed by the Midland Railway in 1903, becoming the Northern Counties Committee (NCC).

In 1879, the Great Northern Railway (GNR) reached Cookstown by way of Dungannon and Stewartstown. Though located next door to the BBR station on Molesworth Street, the GNR station was completely separate. A rail connection between the two stations existed, but for transfer of goods wagons only. There were no through passenger workings.

It was closed to passengers by the Ulster Transport Authority on 28 August 1950 and to goods on 2 May 1955.

The Italianate station building, designed by Charles Lanyon, is made of sandstone. After closure it lay derelict until 1977, having been listed the year before. Today, it is used as a Chinese restaurant. Two further NCC railway buildings survive in Cookstown, with the red-brick Stationmaster's house built in 1910 and 1897-built lamp shed also being listed.

== Routes ==
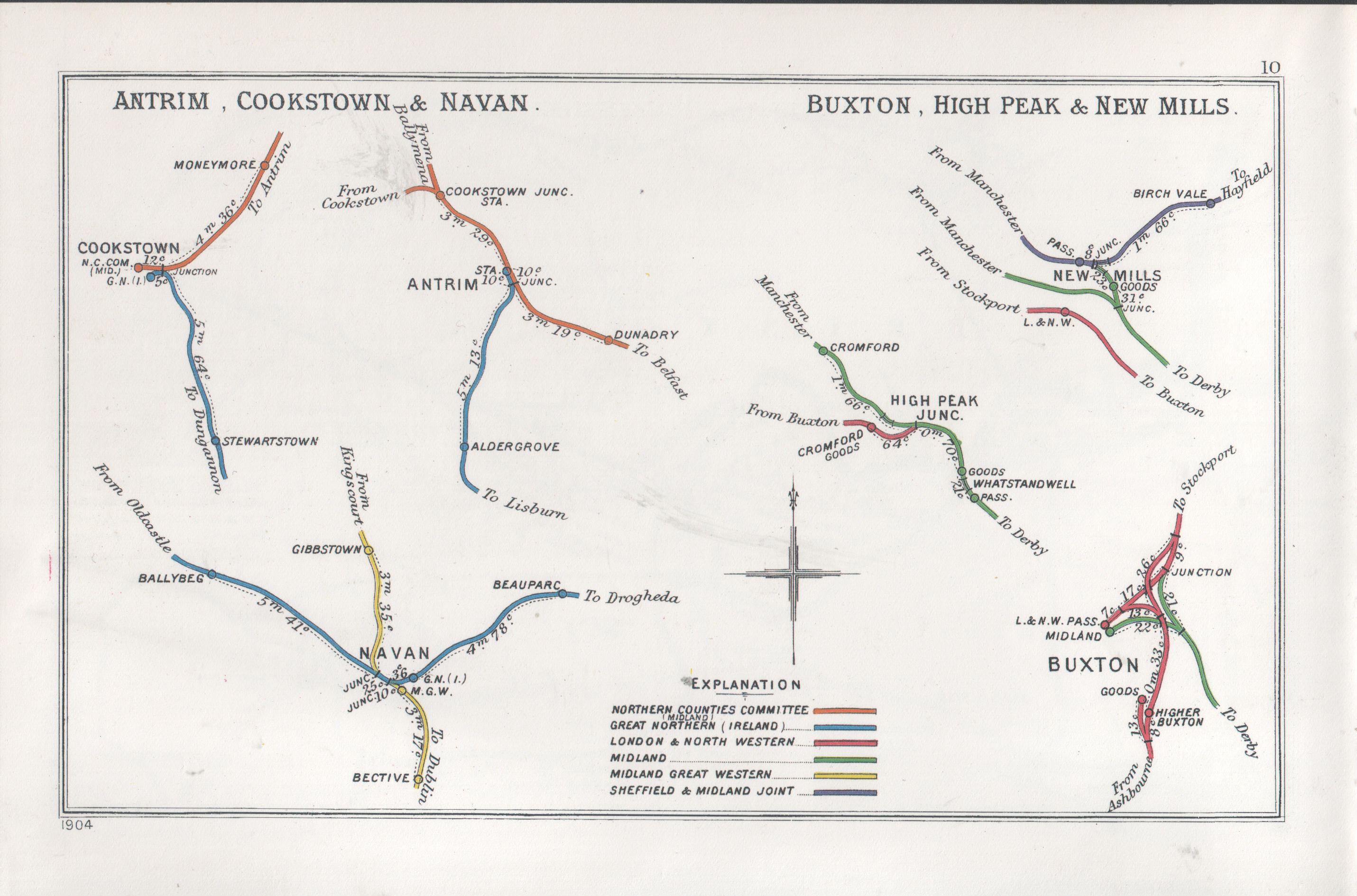
A 1904 Railway Clearing House Junction Diagram showing (top left) railways in the vicinity of Cookstown

Preceding station	Disused railways	Following station
Moneymore	Belfast and Ballymena Railway; Cookstown Junction-Cookstown	Terminus
Cookstown	Great Northern Railway; Goods Wagons Only	Terminus
