= Coalisland railway station =

Railway station in Northern Ireland

Coordinates: 54.5395°N 6.7073°W

Coalisland

General information
- Location: Coalisland, County Tyrone, Northern Ireland; UK

History
- Original company: Great Northern Railway
- Post-grouping: Great Northern Railway

Key dates
- 28 July 1879: Station opens
- 16 January 1956: Station closes to passengers
- 1 April 1965: Station closes
Location
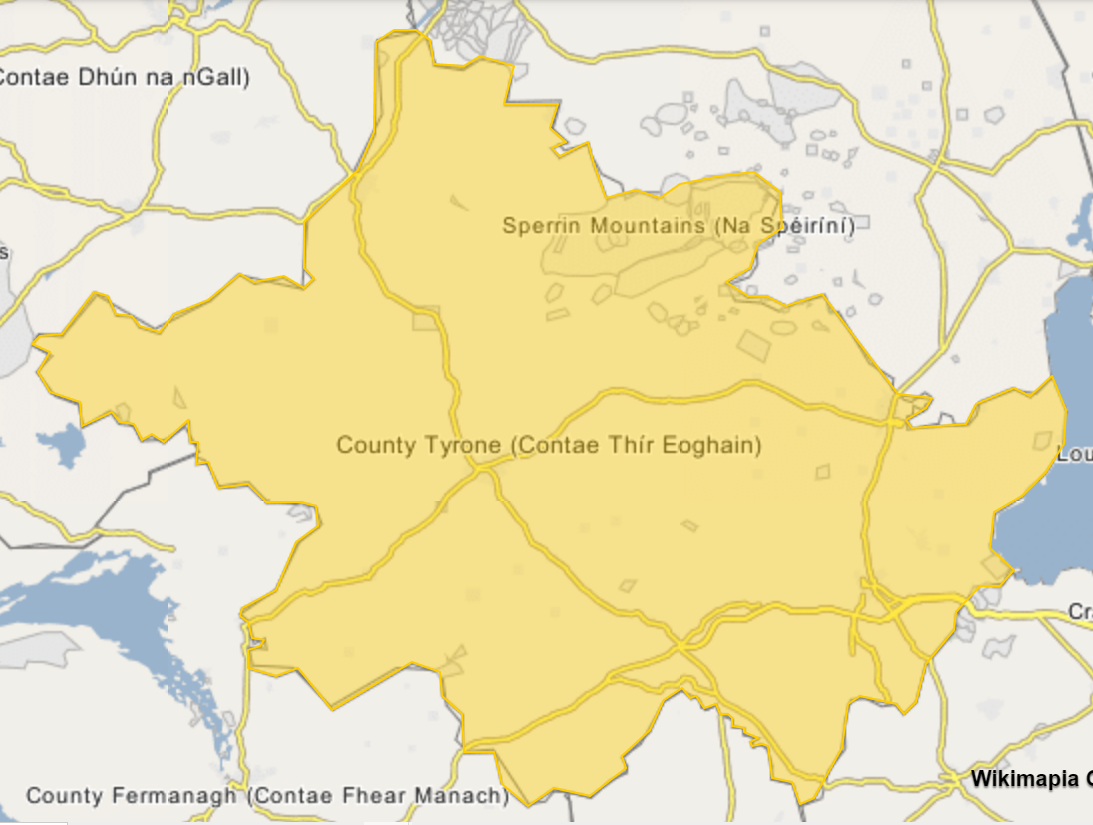
- Location within County Tyrone Location within Northern Ireland

Coalisland railway station served Coalisland in County Tyrone in Northern Ireland.

== History ==
The Great Northern Railway opened the station on 28 July 1879.

The line was closed to passenger traffic on 16 January 1956, but remained open for goos traffic. The line was entirely closed north of Coalisland on 1 June 1959, after which the line only served the coal mines in the village until the Ulster Transport Authority decided to close the Derry Road line, and subsequently the remaining part of the Cookstown branch in 1965, although the branch actually survived the Derry Road's closure until 1 April that year.

== Routes ==
Preceding station	Disused railways	Following station
Dungannon	Great Northern Railway; Dungannon to Cookstown	Stewartstown
