= Leitrim, County Antrim =

Coordinates: 55.094676°N 6.423225°W

Leitrim: Irish: Liatroim
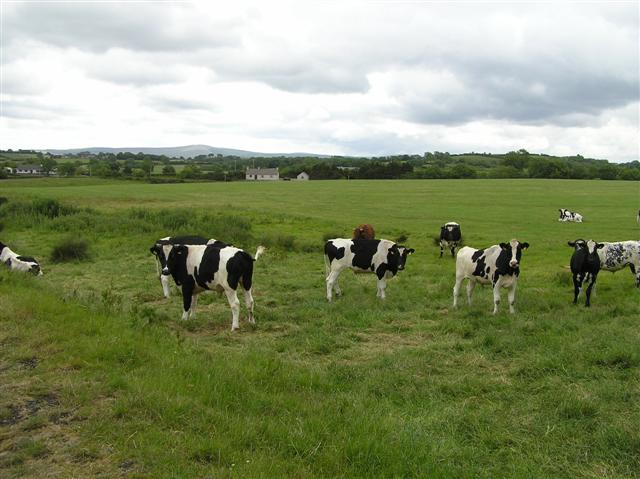
- Pasture in Leitrim townland

- Location within Northern Ireland
- County: County Antrim
- Country: Northern Ireland
- Sovereign state: United Kingdom
- Police: Northern Ireland
- Fire: Northern Ireland
- Ambulance: Northern Ireland

Leitrim (Irish: Liatroim, meaning 'Grey ridge'; /ˈliːtrəm/ LEE-trəm) is a townland in County Antrim, Northern Ireland. It is situated in the civil parish of Ballymoney and the historic Barony of Dunluce Upper.

Leitrim is a rural townland containing three farms and 8 residences. Parts of the Topp Road and Leitrim Road pass through the townland and these are connected (completely within the townland) by Leitrim Lane. All the farms are located off Leitrim Lane. The farmland is mainly used for cattle (both dairy and beef) and a small amount of arable (mainly potatoes and barley). In summer a number of poly-tunnels produce a crop of strawberries. The townland also contains a few small areas of woodland. The townland is marked by signs at both ends of Leitrim Lane entitled 'The Leitrim'. A number of older, previously residential buildings are now used as agricultural buildings.

There is another townland of the same name in the civil parish of Drummaul in the historic barony of Toome Upper.

== See also ==
- List of townlands in County Antrim
