= Stewartstown railway station =

Railway station in County Tyrone, Northern Ireland

Stewartstown

General information
- Location: Stewartstown, County Tyrone, Northern Ireland; UK
- Coordinates: 54.574059°N 6.682343°W

History
- Original company: Great Northern Railway
- Post-grouping: Great Northern Railway

Key dates
- 28 July 1879: Station opens
- 16 January 1956: Station closes to passengers
- 1 June 1958: Station closes
Location

Stewartstown railway station served Stewartstown in County Tyrone in Northern Ireland.

== History ==
The Great Northern Railway opened the station on 28 July 1879.

The line was closed to passenger traffic on 16 January 1956, but the station survived until 1 June 1958. The line was closed north of Coalisland the following year and the rest in 1965.

== Routes ==
Preceding station	Disused railways	Following station
Coalisland	Great Northern Railway; Dungannon to Cookstown	Cookstown
