= Kellswater railway station =

Railway station in County Antrim, Northern Ireland

Kellswater
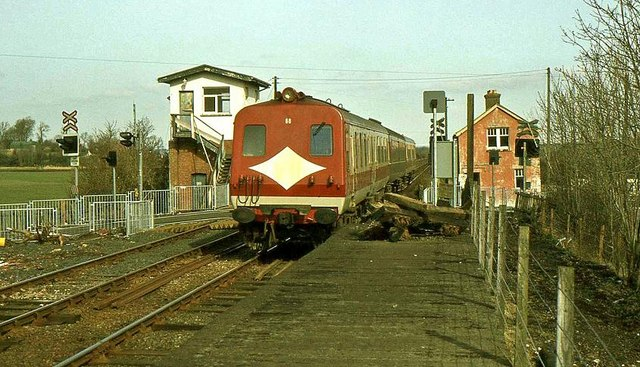
- NIR Class 80 train passing through the remains of Kellswater station in 1985

General information
- Location: Kellswater, County Antrim; Northern Ireland
- Coordinates: 54.8068°N 6.2993°W

Other information
- Status: Disused

History
- Original company: Belfast and Ballymena Railway
- Pre-grouping: Belfast and Northern Counties Railway
- Post-grouping: Northern Ireland Railways

Key dates
- 1 June 1876: Station opens
- 15 March 1971: Station closes
Location

Kellswater railway station served the hamlet of Kellswater in County Antrim, Northern Ireland.

== History ==
The station was opened by the Belfast and Northern Counties Railway on 1 June 1876.

The station, at which trains rarely called, closed to passengers on 15 March 1971.

Preceding station	NI Railways	Following station
Antrim	Northern Ireland Railways; Belfast-Derry	Ballymena
	Historical railways	
Cookstown Junction; Line open, station closed	Belfast and Ballymena Railway; Belfast-Ballymena	Andraid; Line open, station closed
