= The Troubles in Ballymena =

Conflict in Ballymena, Northern Ireland

The Northern Irish Troubles resulted in 11 deaths in or near the mainly Protestant County Antrim town of Ballymena. Eight people were killed by various loyalist groups, and three by the Irish Republican Army (IRA). Two of the IRA victims were members of the Royal Ulster Constabulary; the other victim was a civilian. Of the eleven victims, six were Protestants and five were Catholics. Some of those killings are described below:

== 1974 ==
Sean and Brendan Byrne, aged 54 and 45, Catholics and brothers, were shot by the Ulster Defence Association (UDA) at their pub in Tannaghmore outside Ballymena on 24 May 1974. The pub had stayed open during the Ulster Workers' Council strike. The gunmen arrived at the pub in a convoy with a busload of other loyalists. All 30 men were detained at a police road block. Two were later sentenced to life imprisonment.

== 1976 ==
Yvonne Dunlop, aged 27, a Protestant, was killed as the result of a Provisional IRA firebomb in the shop where she worked on Bridge Street on 9 October 1976. Among those jailed for the attack was IRA member Thomas McElwee, who died in the 1981 Irish hunger strike. Later that same day, a 40-year-old Catholic man, Sean McCrystal, was killed in retaliation by the Ulster Volunteer Force. His burning body was found on waste ground on North Street close to Bridge Street.

On November 6, 1976, at 8:30pm, the Provisional IRA detonated an explosive device containing 500lb of explosives outside the Raglan Bar (named after Lord Raglan) in Queen Street, Ballymena without warning. 37 people were injured. Ten of these were kept in hospital, of whom two were very seriously injured.

== 1978 ==
John Lamont, a 21-year-old Protestant RUC reservist, was shot by the IRA in George Street while he was on duty alone. He was the first member of the police service to be killed in Ballymena.

== 1987 ==
Norman Kennedy, a 41-year-old Protestant RUC officer, was shot dead at his home in Murob Park by the IRA on 26 July 1987.

== Links ==
- NI Conflict Archive on the Internet
- Hansard
