= Braid River =

River in County Antrim, Northern Ireland

Coordinates: 54°50′52″N 6°18′52″W

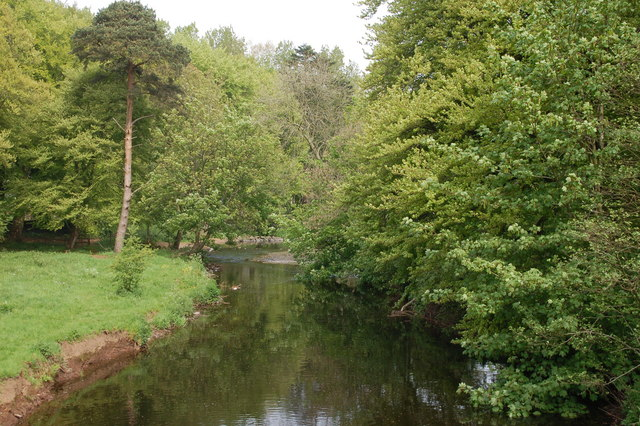
The Braid River, near Ballymena

The Braid River (Irish: Abhainn na Brád) is a river in the borough of Mid and East Antrim, County Antrim, Northern Ireland. It is a tributary to the River Main. Historically, the valley in which the river flows divided the boundaries between the parishes of Skerry and Rathcavan in the 19th century.

Flowing in a south-westerly direction for the entirety of its course, the river rises in the Antrim Hills and follows the A42 road through Broughshane to Ballygarvey; it then flows through Ballymena before flowing into the River Main near the Tullaghgarley townland.

On 10 February 2018, a five-year-old boy died after falling into the river and being swept four miles downstream. He died in hospital.
