= Kellswater =

Hamlet in County Antrim, Northern Ireland

Kellswater is a hamlet near to the village of Kells in Northern Ireland. The name of the hamlet comes from the nearby Kells Water river.

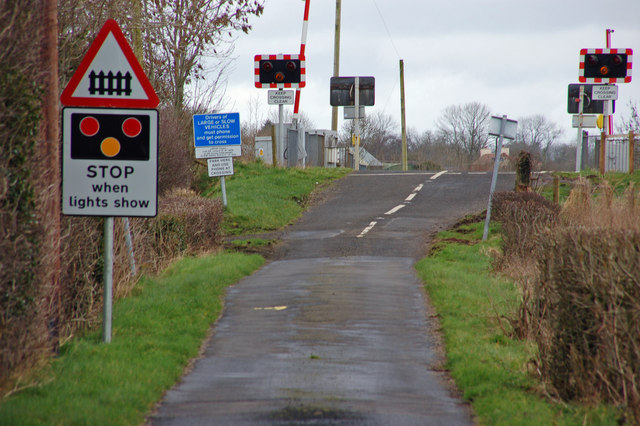
Kellswater North level crossing.

== Transport ==
- Kellswater railway station opened on 1 June 1876 and finally closed on 15 March 1971. One of the platforms of this station cannot be seen from passing trains.
