= St Patrick's Church, Ballymena =

Church in Ballymena, County Antrim, Northern Ireland

St Patrick's Church
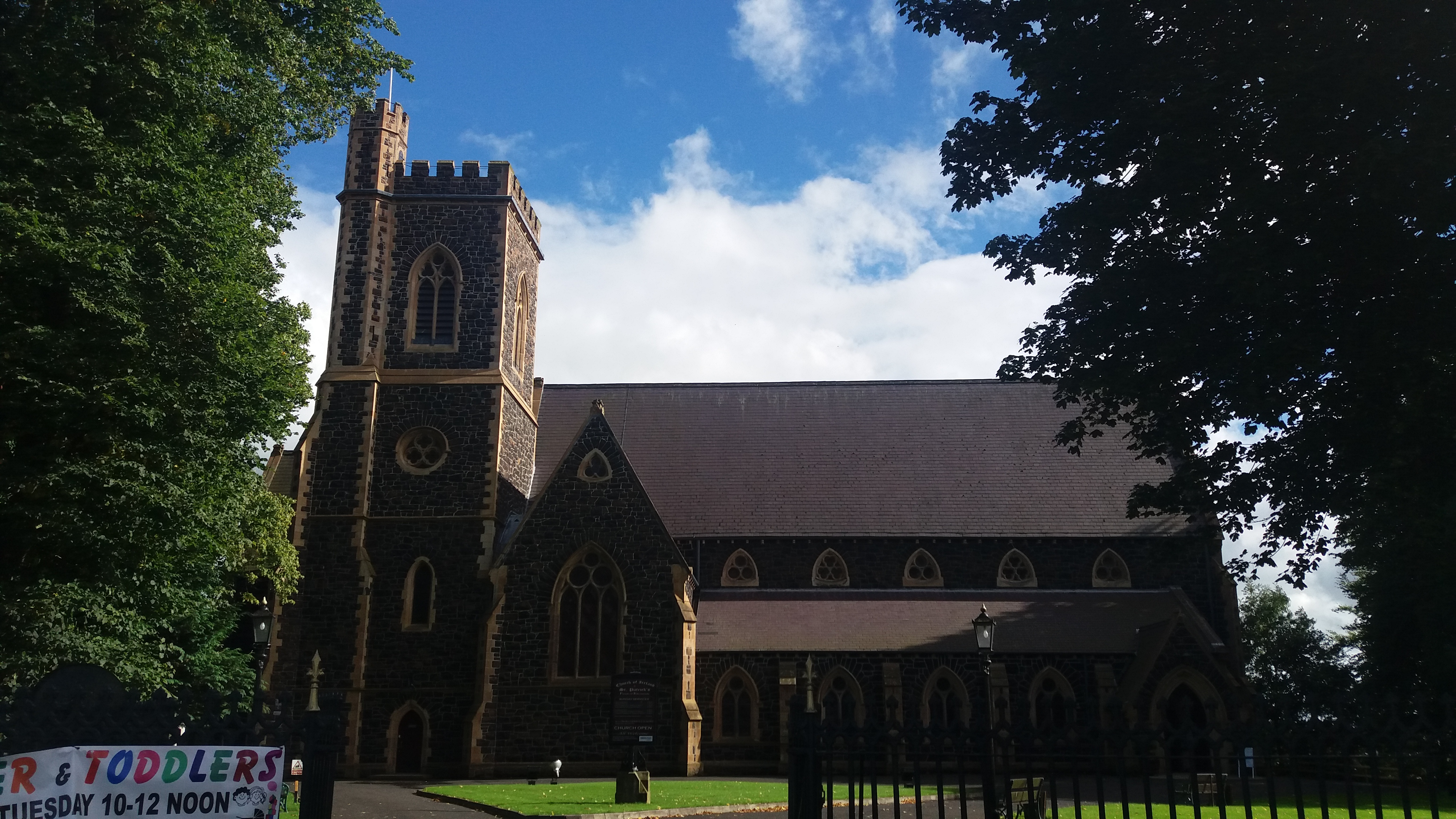
- St Patrick's Church
- 54.8627°N 6.27333°W
- Location: Castle Street, Ballymena
- Country: United Kingdom
- Denomination: Church of Ireland
- Churchmanship: Broad Church

History
- Status: Parish church
- Consecrated: 1855

Architecture
- Functional status: Active
- Style: Early English
- Completed: 1881
- Construction cost: £5,000

Specifications
- Capacity: 800
- Materials: Scrabo sandstone

Administration
- Province: Armagh
- Diocese: Connor
- Parish: Kilconriola and Ballyclug

Clergy
- Priest: Rev. Mark McConnell

St Patrick's Church is a Church of Ireland church, located on Castle Street, Ballymena, Northern Ireland. It is the main Parish Church in Ballymena's Anglican parish of Kirkinriola and Ballyclug, and is the main civic church of the town. The current church replaced an older church dating from the early 18th century (of which the tower and graveyard can still be seen) on Church Street, and was opened in 1855. The new church was destroyed by fire in December 1879, and it was restored by the original builder, keeping to the same design. It reopened in 1881.

== Bells ==
The Church is noted for holding the only peal of twelve bells in Northern Ireland, and also the only twelve in an Irish parish church (peals of twelve exist elsewhere in Ireland, however these are in cathedrals). A bell was in use in the old parish church by the time it was replaced by St. Patrick's, and this bell can be seen, and rung, in the car park of the present church.

A new bell, made specifically for St. Patrick's, was cast in 1866 at the Sheridan Eagle foundry, in Dublin. This bell was moved when a new ring of bells was installed in 1895, and now resides in the church at Lambeg, County Antrim. Change ringing was introduced to the tower in 1895, as a ring of eight bells in the key of E were installed, in memory of Dean Murray, rector from 1865 until 1883. These bells were cast by Mears and Stainbank (of the Whitechapel Bell Foundry).

In 1987, the old bells were sent away to Whitechapel, and recast into a ring of twelve, in the key of F-sharp. The new bells were hallowed on 8 November 1987 and rang out for the first time for the Holy Communion service on Christmas Eve of that year.

The bells are still rung today by a faithful band of ringers, twice on Sundays for the 11.30 am and 6.30 pm services, and for practice on Friday nights.

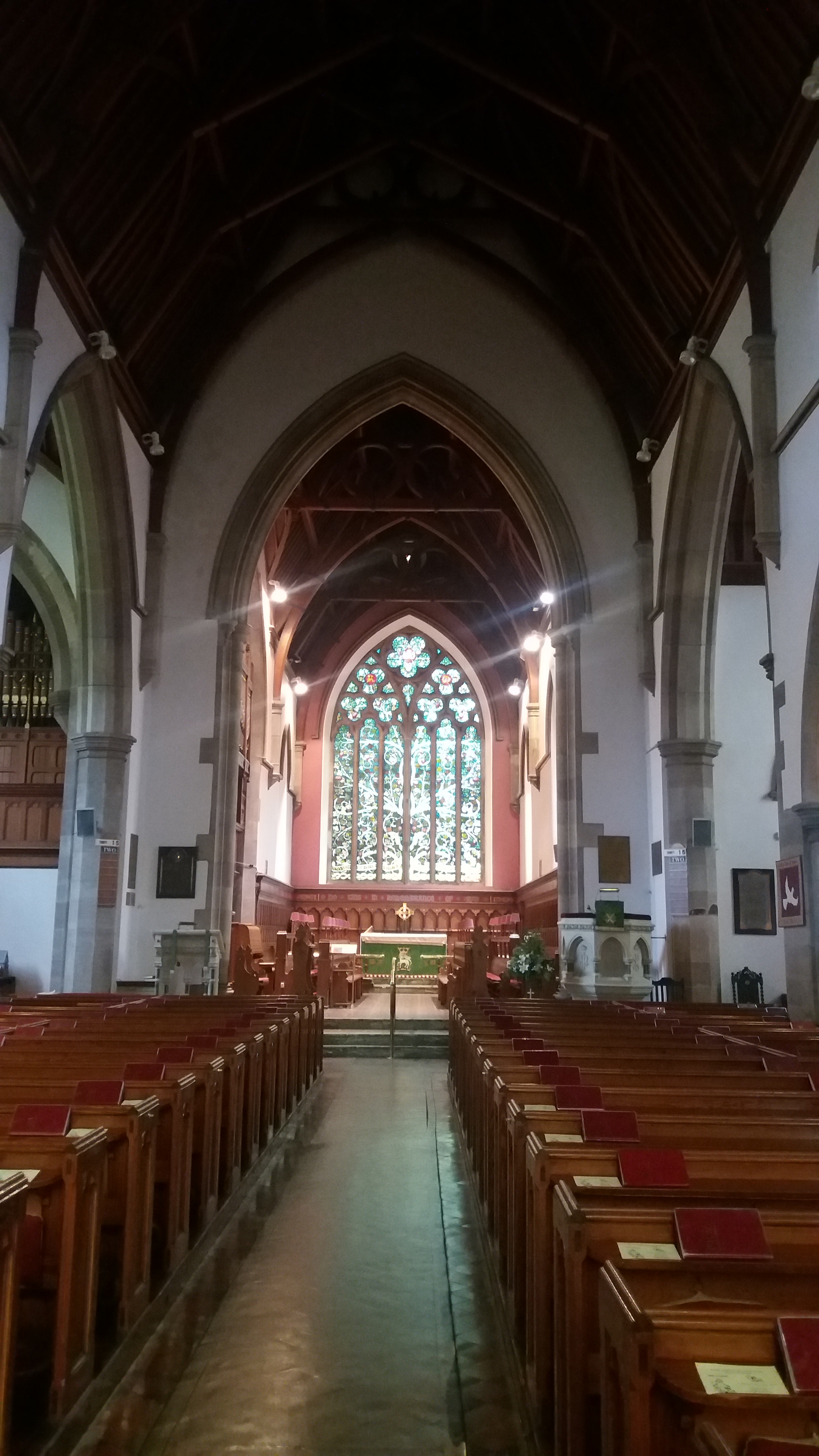
Interior, showing the fine east window and wooden ceiling.
