= William Hemingway Mills =

Chief engineer of the Great Northern Railway of Ireland

- Born: 1834; Yorkshire
- Died: 12 January 1918 (aged 83–84); Glenageary, County Dublin, Ireland
- Education: William Henry Barlow
- Engineering career
- Discipline: Civil engineering
- Projects: Great Northern Railway of Ireland

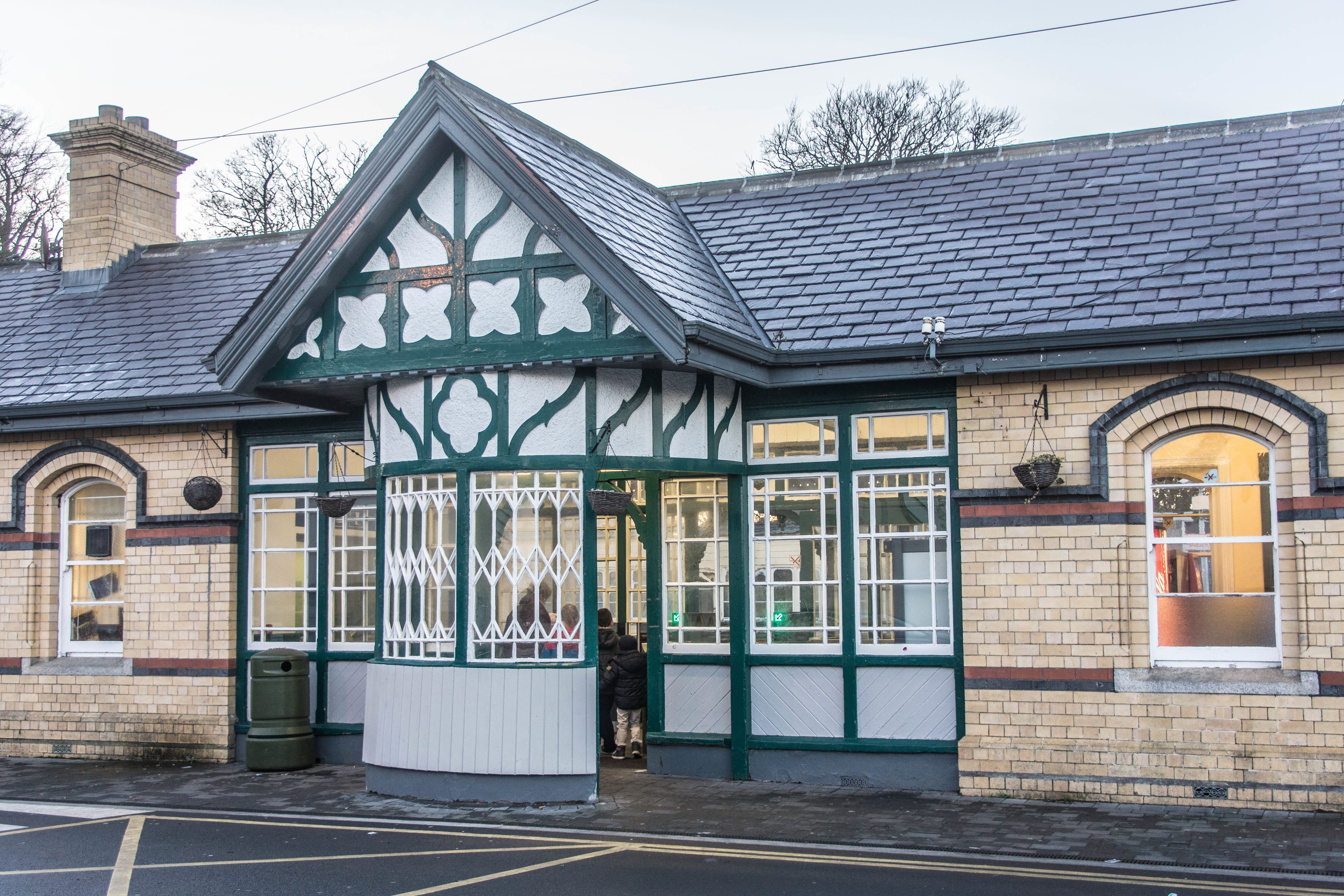
Mill's polychromatic brickwork design for GNR(I) at Malahide station

William Hemingway Mills (Note: Mills is referred to in some sources as William Henry Mills) (1834-1918) was a British civil engineer known for his work with the Great Northern Railway of Ireland (GNR(I)) from its formation in 1876 until his retirement in 1910.

== Life ==
Mills was born in Yorkshire, England in 1834.

He came under the instruction of the William Henry Barlow from 1850. Mills undertook work in Scotland, Andalusia and Mexico before becoming Chief Engineer of the GNR(I) from its formation in 1876.

Mills was to introduce a polychromatic brick style to many buildings in his designs for the GNR(I).

He was to work at the GNR(I) until his retirement in 1910 in his mid–70s. Mills died at his home in Glenageary, County Dublin on 12 January 1918, aged c. 83.

== Literary works ==
- "The Craigellachie Viaduct (Including Plates)". Minutes of the Proceedings. 25 (1866): 229–236. 1866. doi:10.1680/imotp.1866.23188.
- Railway Construction. Longmans' civil engineering series (4 ed.). London, New York, Bombay and Calcutta: Longmans, Green and Co. 1910 [1898]. OCLC 34905092. OL 7120556M.
