= Toome =

Village in County Antrim, Northern Ireland

Coordinates: 54.75°N 6.46°W

Toome: Irish: Tuaim; Scots: Toome Brig
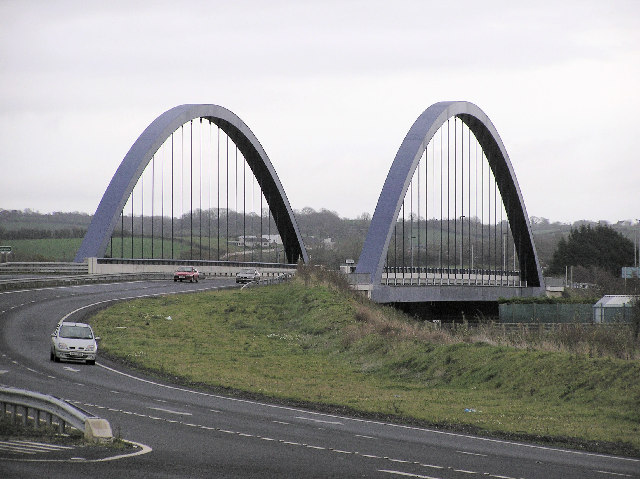
- The bridge over the River Bann at Toome (built 2004)

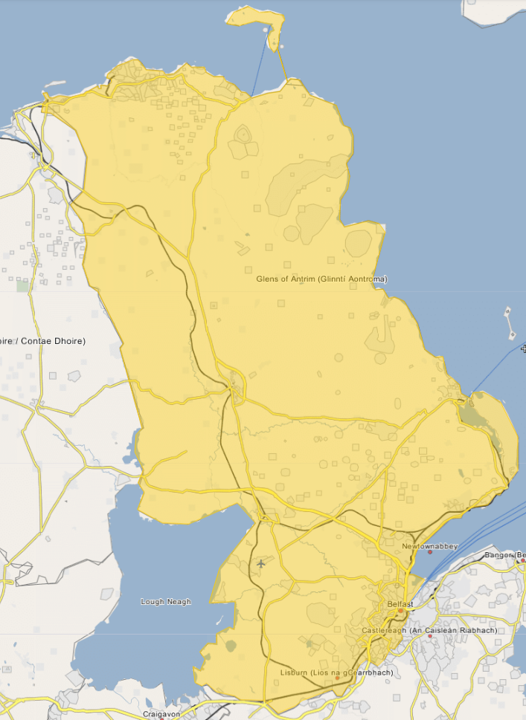
- Location within Northern Ireland
- Population: 1,017 (2021 census)
- Irish grid reference: H9990
  - Belfast: 24
- District: Antrim and Newtownabbey
- County: County Antrim
- Country: Northern Ireland
- Sovereign state: United Kingdom
- Post town: ANTRIM
- Postcode district: BT41
- Dialling code: 028
- UK Parliament: South Antrim
- NI Assembly: South Antrim

Toome or Toomebridge (from Irish Tuaim, meaning 'tumulus') is a village and townland on the northwest corner of Lough Neagh in County Antrim, Northern Ireland. It lies in the civil parish of Duneane in the former barony of Toome Upper, and is in Dunsilly electoral area of Antrim and Newtownabbey Borough Council. It had a population of 1,017 in the 2021 census.

== History ==
In the 5th and/or 6th centuries, there was a woman in the parish of Duneane (Irish: Dún dá Én) known as Ercnat ingen Dáire. In 800 she was remembered as a saint but her cult was forgotten.

Roddy McCorley, a Presbyterian radical, was a local of the parish of Duneane. He fought as a United Irishman in the Rebellion of 1798 against British rule in Ireland but was captured. He was hanged on 28 February 1800 "near the bridge of Toome", which had been partially destroyed by rebels in 1798 to prevent the arrival of reinforcements from west of the River Bann. His body was then dissected by the British and buried under the road that went from Belfast to Derry. In 1852, while the bridge at Toome was being replaced as part of drainage works on Lough Neagh, a nephew had McCorley's body exhumed between March 1852 and October 1853, and McCorley was then given a proper burial in an unmarked grave in Duneane. Although a memorial was made for McCorley's grave later, repeated desecration led to the grave becoming unmarked once more. In November 1954, a memorial in honour of McCorley was erected in Toome, but was destroyed by loyalists using explosives on 1 January 1969, anticipating a People's Democracy civil rights march through the village. In the late 1970s another monument was erected and stands in Toome as you enter the village from County Londonderry. His story became the subject of a popular song written in 1898 by Ethna Carbery.

== Economy ==
Eel fishing is a major industry around Lough Neagh, with Toome hosting the largest eel fishery in Europe. These fisheries supply both the British and European markets. The eel fisheries have been commemorated in a number of poems by Seamus Heaney. In September 2011, the eel fished in Lough Neagh were the first food product in Northern Ireland to achieve a Protected Geographical Indication status in the European Union.

Within the last century, diatomite production has developed as extensive deposits are found in the Toome area. This mineral was used as an absorbent for explosives such as gelignite and as an abrasive in toothpastes and some cleaning products.

== Sport ==
The local Gaelic Athletic Association club in the area is Erins Own GAC, Cargin.

In 1928, Toome was the scene of a hydroplane race on the River Bann. Hydroplanes from all across Ireland and the United Kingdom took part in the 'Bann 100'. The main trophies was The Belfast Newsletter Challenge trophy. Hydroplanes reached speeds of 34.77 mph. The hydroplane, 'Non Sequiter', won the 100-mile (160-kilometre) outboard race.

== Transport ==
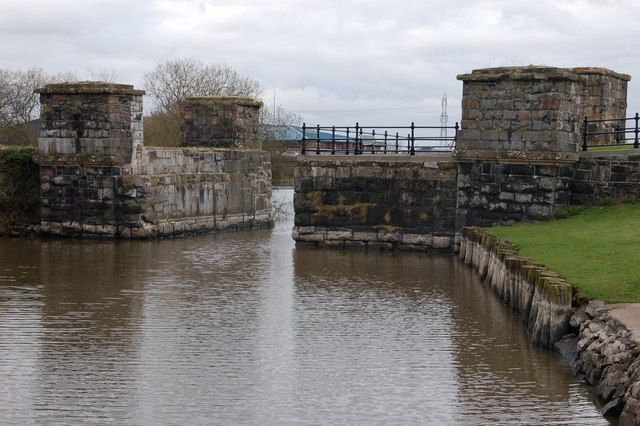
Spanning time and missing a span on the Northern Counties Committee lines over the River Bann at Toome Bridge railway station.

Toome had long been a bottleneck to traffic on the main Belfast to Derry road route. Construction of a bypass began in May 2002 and was completed in March 2004, shortening journey times and relieving congestion in the village.

Toome Bridge railway station was opened on 10 November 1856, shut for passenger traffic on 28 August 1950 and shut altogether on 1 October 1959.

== Population ==
=== 2021 census ===
In the 2021 census, Toome had a population of 1,017 (381 households).

=== 2011 census ===
In the 2011 census, Toome had a population of 781 (263 households); 91% were from a Catholic background and 6.3% were from a Protestant background.

=== 2001 census ===
Toome is classified as a small village or hamlet by the NI Statistics and Research Agency (i.e. with population between 500 and 1,000). On census day (29 April 2001) there were 722 people living in Toome. Of these:

27.2% were aged under 16 years and 10.9% were aged 60 and over
48.8% were male and 51.3% were female
96.3% were from a Catholic background and 2.9% were from a Protestant background
6.2% of people aged 16–74 were unemployed

=== 1911 census ===
In the 1911 census, Toome had a population of 194. Of these:

72.7% were Catholic and 27.3% were Protestant

== Notable people ==
- Motorcycle road racers Michael, John, and Eugene Laverty are from Toome.
- Willie John McBride (born 1940), Rugby union player, is a native of Toome who lives in Ballyclare.
- Robin John Bailie (born 1937), solicitor, businessman and former Ulster Unionist Party and Alliance politician.
- Deirdre Madden (born 1960), writer, was born in Toome.

== See also ==
- List of towns and villages in Northern Ireland
