= Cookstown Junction railway station =

Railway station in Northern Ireland

Cookstown Junction
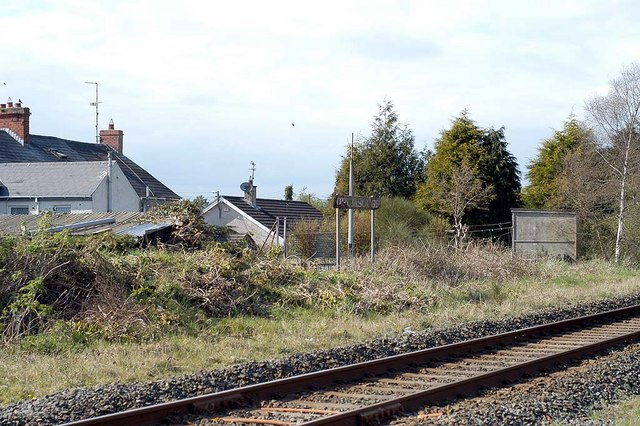
- The remains of Cookstown Junction / Drumsough station in 2007

General information
- Location: Randalstown, County Antrim; Northern Ireland
- Coordinates: 54.7495°N 6.2642°W

Other information
- Status: Disused

History
- Original company: Belfast and Ballymena Railway
- Pre-grouping: Belfast and Northern Counties Railway
- Post-grouping: Belfast and Northern Counties Railway

Key dates
- 11 April 1848: Station opens as Drumscough Junction
- ca. 1850: Station renamed Drumscough
- November 1856: Station renamed Cookstown Junction
- 26 April 1976: Station renamed Drumcough Junction
- 17 October 1976: Station closes
Location

Cookstown Junction railway station served the townland of Drumsough outside Randalstown in County Antrim, Northern Ireland. It was a single island platform at the junction of the Cookstown extension to Magherafelt, Cookstown, Draperstown and Macfin.

== History ==
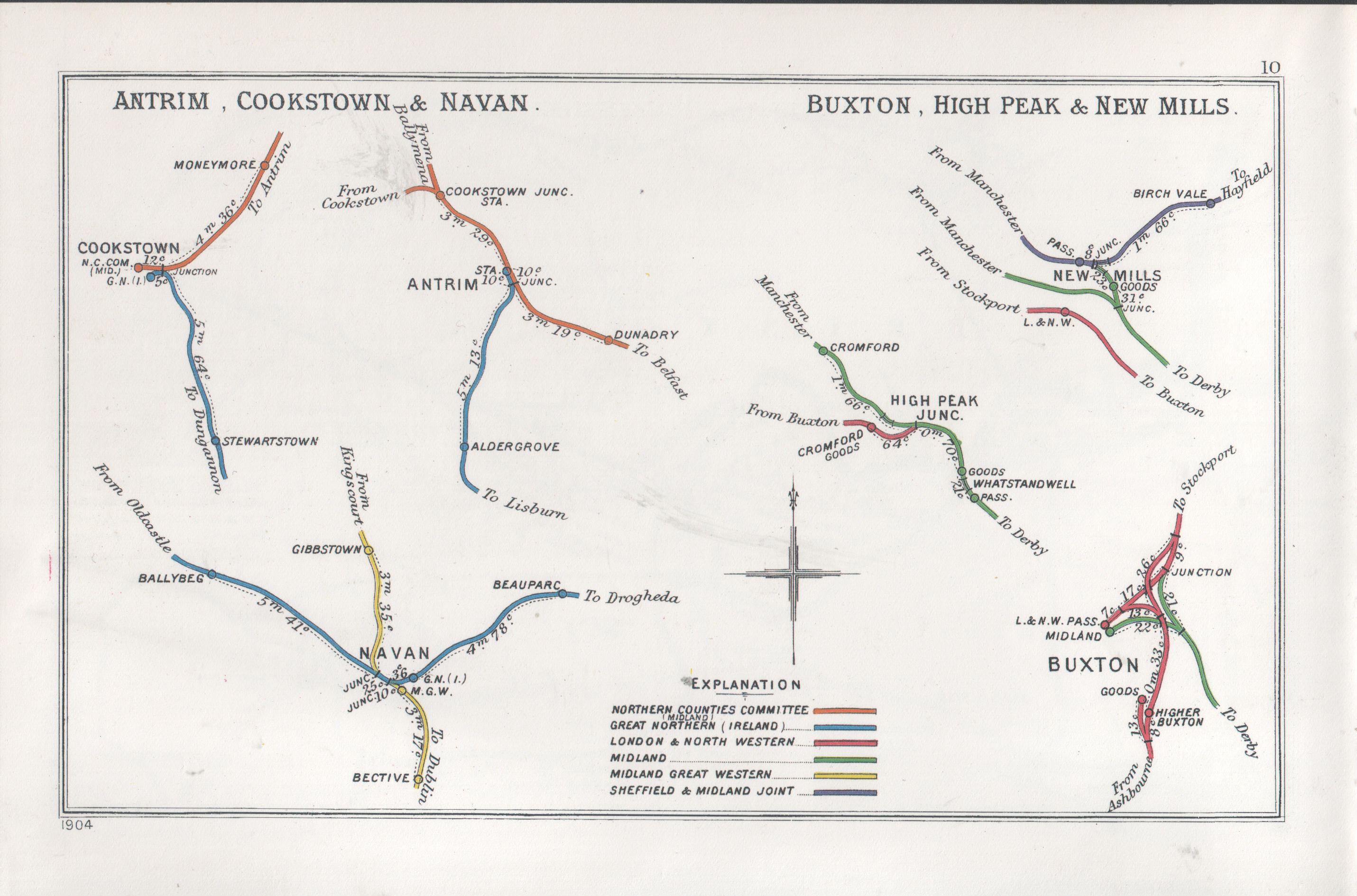
A 1904 Railway Clearing House Junction Diagram showing (top, left of centre) railways in the vicinity of Cookstown Junction

The station was opened as Drumsough Junction by the Belfast and Ballymena Railway on 11 April 1848.

It was renamed Cookstown Junction on 1 October 1858.

The station closed to passengers on 28 August 1950.

Preceding station	NI Railways	Following station
Antrim	Ulster Transport Authority; Belfast-Derry	Kellswater
Terminus	Ulster Transport Authority; Drumsough-Cookstown	Randalstown
	Historical railways	
Antrim	Belfast and Ballymena Railway; Belfast York Road-Ballymena	Kellswater
Terminus	Belfast and Ballymena Railway; Cookstown Junction-Cookstown	Randalstown
