= Ballymena =

Town in County Antrim, Northern Ireland

Coordinates: 54.86°N 6.28°W

Ballymena: Irish: an Baile Meánach
- Town
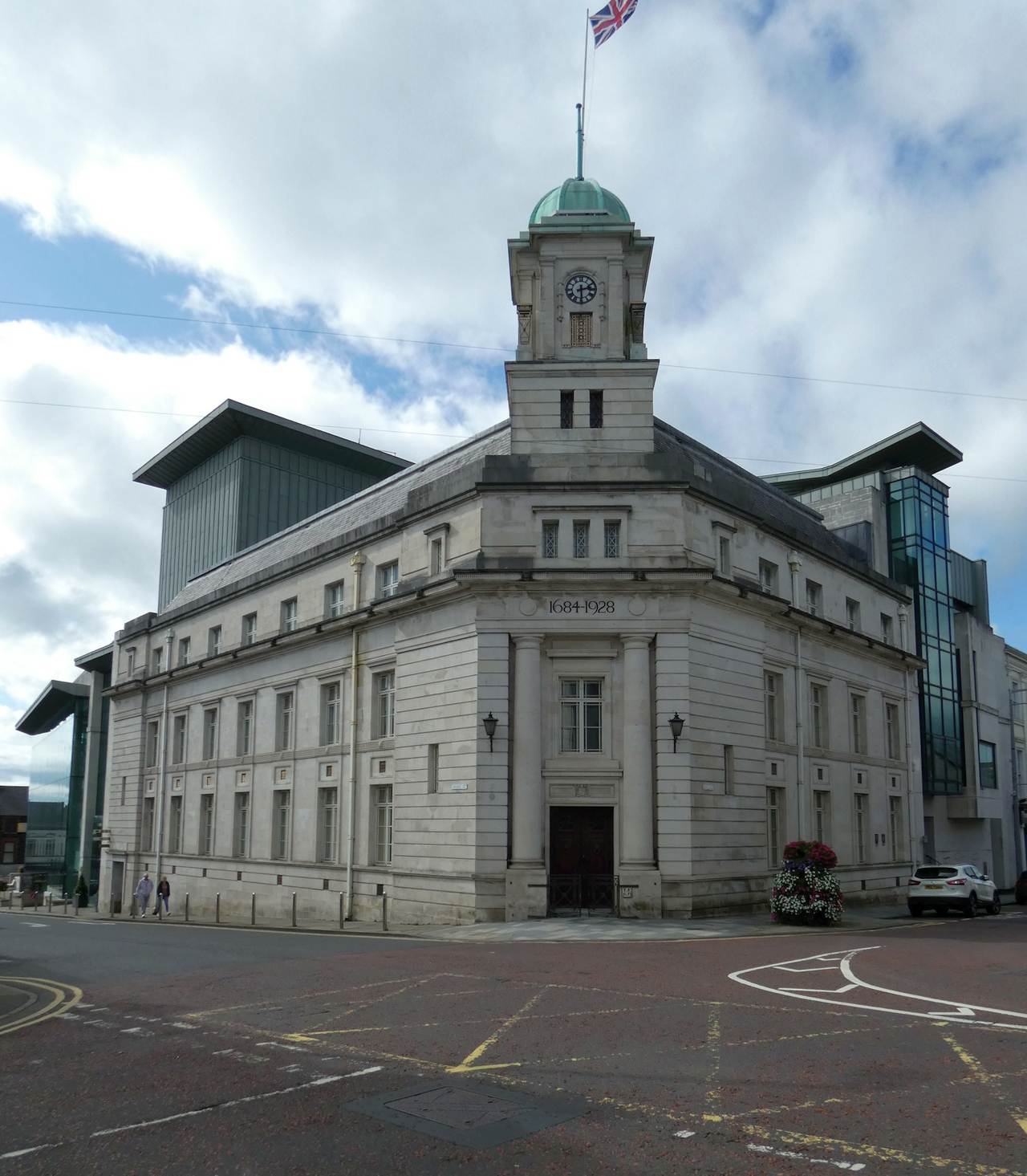
- Ballymena Town Hall, with the Braid Arts Centre behind

- Coat of Arms

- Location within Northern Ireland
- Population: 31,205 (2021 census)
- Irish grid reference: D1003
  - Belfast: 28 miles (45 km) SE
- District: Mid and East Antrim
- County: County Antrim
- Country: Northern Ireland
- Sovereign state: United Kingdom
- Post town: BALLYMENA
- Postcode district: BT42–BT44
- Dialling code: 028
- Police: Northern Ireland
- Fire: Northern Ireland
- Ambulance: Northern Ireland
- UK Parliament: North Antrim
- NI Assembly: North Antrim

Ballymena (Note: English pronunciation: /ˌbæliˈmiːnə/, BAL-ee-MEE-nə Irish: an Baile Meánach, meaning 'the middle townland' Irish pronunciation: [ənˠ ˌbˠalʲə ˈmʲaːn̪ˠəx]) is a town in County Antrim, Northern Ireland. It is situated on the Braid River, about 28 miles (45 km) northwest of Belfast. It had a population of 31,205 at the 2021 census, making it the seventh largest town in Northern Ireland by population. It is part of the Borough of Mid and East Antrim.

The town was built on the Braid River, on land given to the Adair family by King Charles I in 1626, with a right to hold two annual fairs and a Saturday market in perpetuity. Surrounding villages are Cullybackey, Ahoghill, Broughshane, and Kells-Connor.

== History ==
=== Early history ===
Ballymena's recorded history dates to the Early Christian period, from the 5th to the 7th centuries. Ringforts are found in the townland of Ballykeel, and a site known as Camphill Fort in the townland of Ballee may also have been of this type. There are a number of souterrains within a 1 1/4 miles (2.0 km) radius of the centre of Ballymena. Two miles (3.2 kilometres) north in the townland of Kirkinriola, the medieval parish church and graveyard show signs of Early Christian settlement, including a souterrain. Also in 1868, a gravedigger found a large stone slab on which was carved a cross with the inscription ord do degen. This refers to Bishop Degen, who lived in Ireland during the seventh century. This stone is now in the porch of St Patrick's Church of Ireland, at the end of Castle Street. At the end of the 5th century, a church was founded in Connor, five miles (8.0 kilometres) south of Ballymena. This was followed by a monastery at Templemoyle, Kells. In 831, Vikings invaded the area and burned the church.

In the late 12th century, the Anglo-Normans invaded Ireland and conquered much of what is now eastern Ulster, creating the Earldom of Ulster. They built a motte-and-bailey fort in what is now the Harryville area of Ballymena. It is one of the best-surviving examples of this type of fortification in Northern Ireland.

In 1315, Edward Bruce (brother of Scottish king Robert the Bruce) invaded the Earldom of Ulster, opening up another front in the war against the English. On 10 September 1315, at the Battle of Connor, near Ballymena, Edward's army defeated the army of Richard de Burgh, the Anglo-Norman Earl of Ulster.

=== 17th and 18th centuries ===
On 10 May 1607, during the Plantation of Ulster, King James I of England granted the native Irish chief, Ruairí Óg MacQuillan, the Ballymena Estate. The estate passed through several owners, eventually passing into the possession of William Adair, a Scottish laird from Kinhilt in southwestern Scotland. The estate was temporarily renamed "Kinhilstown" after Adair's lands in Scotland. The original castle of Ballymena was built in the early 17th century, situated to take advantage of an ancient ford on the River Braid. In 1626 Charles I confirmed the grant of the Ballymena Estate to William Adair, giving him the right to hold a market at Ballymena every Saturday. He hired local Irish as workers on the estate; they served as tenant farmers for much of the next two centuries and more. Galgorm nearby was granted to Sir Faithful Fortescue. In 1618 he built the Castle, which still exists.

During the Irish Rebellion of 1641, the local Ballymena garrison were defeated by Irish rebels in the battle of Bundooragh. In 1690, during the Williamite-Jacobite War, Williamite general the Duke of Württemberg used Galgorm Castle as his headquarters. Sir Robert Adair raised a Regiment of Foot for King William III and fought at the Battle of the Boyne.

Ballymena's first market hall was built in 1684. By 1704, the population of Ballymena had reached 800. In 1707, the first Protestant (Church of Ireland) parish church was built. In 1740, the original Ballymena Castle burned down. The Gracehill Moravian settlement was founded in 1765.

During the United Irish uprising of 1798, Ballymena was occupied on 7 June by rebels who stormed the market hall, killing three of its defenders. By the following day, the insurgent army had grown to more than 10,000, but by evening it had begun to disperse on news of the rebel defeat at Antrim town. The town surrendered to government forces on the morning of the 9th, avoiding the fate of Randalstown, Templepatrick and Ballymoney, which were set ablaze.

Ballymena's first modern Roman Catholic Church was consecrated in 1827. By 1834 the population of Ballymena was about 4,000. In 1848 the Belfast and Ballymena Railway was established. In 1865 Robert Alexander Shafto Adair (later Baron Waveney) started building Ballymena Castle, a magnificent family residence, in the Demesne. It was completed in 1887.

In 1870 The People's Park was established.

=== 20th century ===
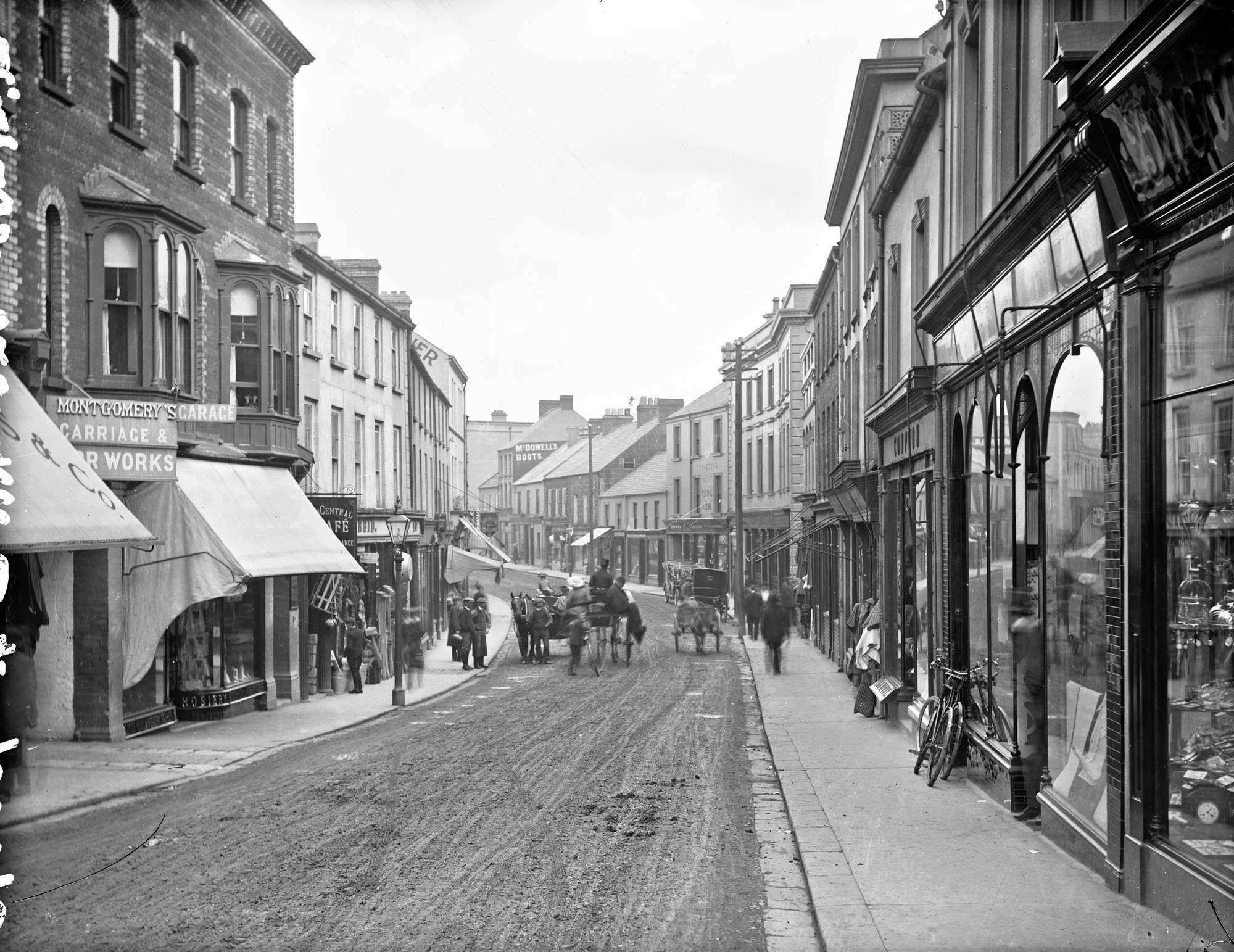
Church Street, Ballymena, in the early 1900s

In 1900, Ballymena assumed urban district status. Under the provisions of the Land Purchase (Ireland) Act 1903, the Adairs disposed of most of their Ballymena estate to the occupying tenants in 1904. The old market hall building, which also contained the post office and estate office, burned down in 1919. The new Ballymena Town Hall was officially opened by the Duke of Abercorn on 20 November 1928.

The Urban District Council petitioned for borough status and the Charter was granted in December 1937. The first meeting of councillors as a Borough Council was held on 23 May 1939. The population of Ballymena reached 13,000. Ballymena Castle was demolished in the 1950s. In 1973, the Urban and Rural District Councils were merged to create Ballymena Borough Council. Following local government reorganisation in 2015, the Borough Council was merged with the Boroughs of Carrickfergus Borough Council and Larne Borough Council.

During the Second World War, Ballymena was home to a large number of evacuees from Gibraltar. They were housed with local families.

In the 1950s St Patrick's Barracks in Ballymena was the Regimental Training Depot of the Royal Ulster Rifles (83rd & 86th). Many young men who had been conscripted in England, Scotland and Wales, along with others who had volunteered for service in the British Army, embarked upon their period of basic training in the Regimental Depot, prior to being posted to the regular regimental battalions. Many of these young men were to serve in Korea, Cyprus and with the British Army of the Rhine. In 1968 due to a series of government austerity measures, the remaining three Irish regiments, Royal Inniskilling Fusiliers (27th) Royal Ulster Rifles (83rd & 86th) and the Royal Irish Fusiliers (89th) merged to become the Royal Irish Rangers. Early in the 1990s the Royal Irish Regiment, whose Regimental Headquarters was at St Patrick's Barracks, was granted the Freedom of the Borough.

Like other towns in Northern Ireland, Ballymena was affected by the Troubles, a lengthy period of religious and partisan tensions and armed confrontations from the 1960s until 1998. A total of eleven people were killed in or near the town by the IRA and various loyalist groups.

During the later half of the 20th century, Ballymena, like many other once prosperous industrial centres in Northern Ireland, experienced economic change and industrial restructuring; many of its former factories closed. Since the 2010s Ballymena has seen a decline in its retail and manufacturing sectors. Both Michelin and JTI have left the area. Local firm Wrightbus is also struggling, citing a downturn in orders. It is hoped that the creation of a manufacturing hub at the former Michelin site will attract businesses to the area.

=== 21st century ===
In January 2013, the actor Liam Neeson, a native of Ballymena, received the freedom of the borough. Ian Paisley was made a freeman of Ballymena in December 2004.

Ballymena is described by some observers as being at the heart of Northern Ireland's equivalent of the Bible Belt. It has a Protestant majority. In the early 1990s the Democratic Unionist Party (DUP)-dominated town council banned a performance by the ELO Part II in the township, saying they would attract "the four Ds Drink, Drugs, Devil and Debauchery". The Council banned the screening of Brokeback Mountain (2005), starring Jake Gyllenhaal and Heath Ledger, as it featured a homosexual relationship. An impersonator of comic Roy 'Chubby' Brown was also banned.

The majority of the town's Catholic population is situated around the Broughshane and Cushendall Road areas. Recently there has been tension in the Dunclug area of the town which now has a Catholic majority. These tensions have been associated with internment bonfires and the flying of republican flags; the town has tried to reduce tensions.

In 2011 it was revealed that Ballymena has the third-highest level of legal gun ownership in Northern Ireland.

Ballymena competed for city status as part of the Platinum Jubilee Civic Honours. However, the bid was unsuccessful.

In June 2025, Ballymena was the scene of an alleged attempted oral rape by two 14-year-old immigrant boys which triggered heavy rioting that lasted for several days. The police alleged the riots were racially motivated.

== Economy ==
Ballymena was traditionally a market town. The 1980s were a time of job losses in Ballymena as industry suffered and this reoccurred in the 2010s.

Notable employers were Michelin in Broughshane, JTI Gallaher in Galgorm, and Wrightbus.

In November 2012, the Patton Group, a major builder entered administration with the loss of 320 jobs.

In October 2014, it was announced that JTI Gallaher's would be closing with a loss of 877 jobs.

In November 2015, Michelin decided to close their Ballymena factory after 50 years, resulting in the loss of up to 850 jobs.

== Demographics ==
Historical population
| Year | Pop. | ±% |
|---|---|---|
| 1821 | 2,740 | — |
| 1831 | 4,067 | +48.4% |
| 1841 | 5,549 | +36.4% |
| 1851 | 6,136 | +10.6% |
| 1861 | 6,769 | +10.3% |
| 1871 | 7,932 | +17.2% |
| 1881 | 8,883 | +12.0% |
| 1891 | 8,655 | −2.6% |
| 1901 | 10,886 | +25.8% |
| 1911 | 11,381 | +4.5% |
| 1926 | 11,873 | +4.3% |
| 1937 | 12,928 | +8.9% |
| 1951 | 14,173 | +9.6% |
| 1961 | 14,734 | +4.0% |
| 1966 | 15,917 | +8.0% |
| 1971 | 23,386 | +46.9% |
| 1981 | 18,166 | −22.3% |
| 2001 | 28,717 | +58.1% |
| 2011 | 29,551 | +2.9% |
| 2021 | 31,205 | +5.6% |

=== 2021 census ===
On census day (21 March 2021) there were 31,205 people living in Ballymena. Of these:

- 51.6% of the usually resident population were female, and 48.4% were male.
- 59.53% belong to or were brought up 'Protestant and other (non-Catholic Christian) (including Christian related)', 27.44% belong to or were brought up 'Catholic', 1.06% belong to or were brought up in an 'other religion' and 11.97% did not belong to or were not brought up in any religion.
- 55.98% indicated that they had a British national identity, 31.28% had a Northern Irish national identity, 12.31% had an Irish national identity, and 16.19% indicated an 'other' national identity. (respondents could indicate more than one national identity).
- 17.74% had some knowledge of Ulster-Scots and 6.18% had some knowledge of Irish (Gaeilge).

=== 2011 census ===
On census day (27 March 2011) there were 29,551 people living in Ballymena, accounting for 1.63% of the NI total, representing an increase of 2.9% on the 2001 census population of 28,717. Of these:

- 19.20% were aged under 16 years and 17.61% were aged 65 and over.
- 52.00% of the usually resident population were female 48.00% were male.
- 65.76% belong to or were brought up 'Protestant and other (non-Catholic Christian) (including Christian related)' and 26.71% belong to or were brought up Catholic Christian.
- 65.51% indicated that they had a British national identity, 27.66% had a Northern Irish national identity and 11.25% had an Irish national identity (respondents could indicate more than one national identity).
- 39 years was the average (median) age of the population.
- 17.67% had some knowledge of Ulster-Scots and 5.66% had some knowledge of Irish (Gaeilge).

== Education ==
There are a number of educational establishments in the town. These include:

- Primary schools
  - Ballymena Primary School
  - Braidside Integrated Primary School
  - Dunclug Primary School
  - St. Brigid's Primary School
  - St. Colmcille's Primary School
- Secondary schools
  - Ballymena Academy
  - Cambridge House Grammar School
  - Dunclug College
  - Slemish College
  - St Louis Grammar School, Ballymena
  - St Patrick's College, Ballymena
- Further and Higher Education
  - Northern Regional College

== Transport ==
Ballymena railway station opened on 4 December 1855. A station was opened at Harryville on 24 August 1878, but closed on 3 June 1940.

The Ballymena, Cushendall and Red Bay Railway operated narrow gauge railway services from Ballymena to Parkmore from 1875 to 1940.

The Ballymena and Larne Railway was another narrow gauge railway. The line opened in 1878, but closed to passengers in 1933 and to goods traffic in 1940. Between 1878 and 1880 the line terminated at Harryville, but was then extended to the town's main railway station.

== Sport ==
Association football clubs in the area include Ballymena United F.C., Coaching For Christ, Southside Rangers F.C. and Wakehurst F.C.

Ballymena RFC is a local rugby union club.

All Saints GAC is the only Gaelic Athletic Association club in the town.

Ballymena Golf Club was founded in 1903.

Other Ballymena sports clubs include Ballymena Cricket Club, Ballymena Lawn Tennis Club, Ballymena Basketball Club and Ballymena Bowling Club.

== Townlands ==
Townlands are traditional land divisions used in Ireland. Ballymena covers all or part of the following townlands:

- Ballee (from Irish Baile Aodha 'Hugh's townland')
- Ballycreggy (from Baile na Creige, 'townland of the rock/rocky land')
- Ballykeel (from An Baile Caol, 'the narrow townland/farmstead')
- Ballyloughan (from Baile Locháin, 'townland of the little lake')
- Bottom
- Brocklamont (historically Broghnamolt, from Bruach na Molt, 'bank of the wethers')
- Carniny (probably from Carn Fhainche, 'Fainche's cairn')
- Dunclug (from Dún Cloig, 'fort of the bell')
- Galgorm (from Gall Gorm, 'blue castle', referring to a castle of the McQuillans which was burnt down in 1641)
- Town Parks of Ballymena (from An Baile Meánach, 'the middle townland/farmstead')

== Climate ==
Climate data for Portglenone (64 m elevation) 1981–2010
| Month | Jan | Feb | Mar | Apr | May | Jun | Jul | Aug | Sep | Oct | Nov | Dec | Year |
|---|---|---|---|---|---|---|---|---|---|---|---|---|---|
| Mean daily maximum °C (°F) | 6.9 (44.4) | 7.4 (45.3) | 9.5 (49.1) | 11.7 (53.1) | 14.6 (58.3) | 16.9 (62.4) | 18.6 (65.5) | 18.3 (64.9) | 16.2 (61.2) | 12.7 (54.9) | 9.4 (48.9) | 7.2 (45.0) | 12.5 (54.5) |
| Mean daily minimum °C (°F) | 1.7 (35.1) | 1.5 (34.7) | 2.8 (37.0) | 4.2 (39.6) | 6.5 (43.7) | 9.2 (48.6) | 11.2 (52.2) | 11.0 (51.8) | 9.4 (48.9) | 6.6 (43.9) | 3.8 (38.8) | 2.1 (35.8) | 5.9 (42.6) |
| Average rainfall mm (inches) | 91.4 (3.60) | 60.8 (2.39) | 77.9 (3.07) | 64.2 (2.53) | 64.0 (2.52) | 70.0 (2.76) | 77.5 (3.05) | 88.5 (3.48) | 79.5 (3.13) | 101.1 (3.98) | 89.6 (3.53) | 89.2 (3.51) | 953.6 (37.54) |
| Average rainy days (≥ 1.0 mm) | 16.2 | 12.6 | 14.6 | 12.8 | 13.6 | 12.2 | 14.5 | 13.9 | 14.8 | 16.7 | 15.8 | 15.8 | 173.5 |
Source: metoffice.gov.uk

== Notable people ==
=== Arts and media ===
- Ethna Carbery, journalist, writer, poet, founding member of Inghinidhe na hÉireann
- Ian Cochrane, novelist
- Graham Forsythe, artist
- Jackie Fullerton, BBC sports broadcaster
- Joanne Hogg, singer
- Ronald Mason, BBC executive
- David McWilliams, singer-songwriter
- George Millar, singer
- Liam Neeson, actor
- James Nesbitt, actor
- Clodagh Rodgers, pop singer
- David Herbison, (Baird of Dunclug) poet

=== Politics ===
- Roger Casement, human rights activist and Irish nationalist
- James McHenry, signatory of the United States Constitution
- Wauhope Lynn (1856–1920), lawyer, judge, and politician
- Ian Paisley, the former First Minister and founder of the Free Presbyterian Church
- Richard Seymour, writer and activist
- Derrick White, writer

=== Academia and science ===
- Darwin Caldwell, robotics expert
- Sir Samuel Curran, physicist,
- Alexander Carlisle, ship designer
- Michael Taylor, historian and former cricketer

=== Religion ===
- Alexander Campbell, leader in the Restoration Movement in the United States
- James McKeown, missionary in the Gold Coast (now Ghana)

=== Military ===
- Alexander Wright, a Victoria Cross recipient

=== Business ===
- Timothy Eaton, founder of Eaton's department store

=== Sport ===
- Steven Davis, Rangers F.C. and Northern Ireland International footballer
- Jamie Hamilton, motorcycle racer
- Trai Hume, Sunderland AFC and Northern Ireland International footballer
- David Humphreys, Ulster and Ireland rugby union player
- Ian Humphreys, Ulster and Ireland rugby union player
- Eamonn Loughran, former world welterweight champion boxer
- Matt McCullough, Ulster and Ireland rugby player
- Tom McKinney, Great Britain rugby league footballer
- Sharon McPeake, high jumper
- Syd Millar, Ireland rugby union player and former chairman of the IRB
- Colin Murdock, Preston North End F.C. and former Northern Ireland international footballer
- Mary Peters, Olympic pentathlon gold medalist
- Jamie Smith, rugby union player
- Nigel Worthington, footballer, international team manager
- Bryan Young, Ulster and Ireland international rugby union player

== International relations ==
=== Twin towns ===
- Gibraltar
- (Republic of Ireland) Castlebar, Ireland

== See also ==
- Market houses in Northern Ireland
- List of localities in Northern Ireland by population
- Slemish Mountain

== Other sources ==
- "Battle Over Ballymena's Heroes." (8 March 2000). Belfast News Letter, p. 1.
- Judd, Terri. (9 March 2000). "Old hatreds Flare Over Neeson Freedom Award." The Independent (London), p. 7.
- Watson-Smyth, Kate. (23 March 2000). "Row Over Religion Sours Ballymena's Award to Actor." The Independent (London), p. 12.
- Ballymena on the Culture Northern Ireland website.
- Ordnance Survey Memoirs of Ireland, Parishes of County Antrim V111, Vol 23, 1831–5,1837–8. The Institute of Irish Studies, The Queens University Belfast. ISBN 0-85389-466-3
