= Randalstown railway station =

Former railway station in County Antrim, Northern Ireland

Randalstown
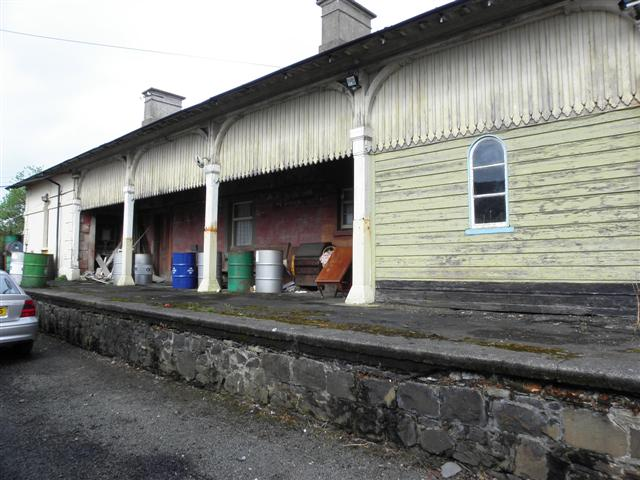
- The former station at Randalstown, which is now a private residence.

General information
- Location: Station Road; Randalstown, County Antrim; Northern Ireland
- Coordinates: 54.7499°N 6.3123°W

Other information
- Status: Disused

History
- Original company: Belfast and Ballymena Railway
- Pre-grouping: Belfast and Northern Counties Railway
- Post-grouping: Northern Counties Committee

Key dates
- 11 April 1848: Station opens
- 10 November 1856: Station relocated for Cookstown extension
- 28 August 1950: Station closes to passengers
- 1 October 1959: Station closes
Location

Randalstown railway station was on the Belfast and Ballymena Railway's Cookstown branch line, which ran from Cookstown Junction to Cookstown in Northern Ireland.

== History ==
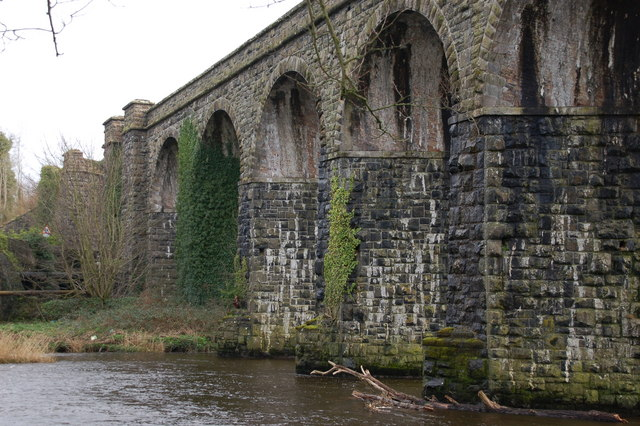
Randalstown railway viaduct, which is now a linear park.

The station was opened by the Belfast and Ballymena Railway on 11 April 1848. The station buildings were designed by the architect Charles Lanyon.

The station was moved and re-opened slightly south on 10 November 1856 when the line was extended to Cookstown.

The line was closed to passengers by the Ulster Transport Authority on 28 August 1950 and to goods on 1 October 1959.

== Routes ==
Preceding station	Historical railways	Following station
Cookstown Junction; Line and station closed	Belfast and Ballymena Railway; Cookstown branch line	Staffordstown; Line and station closed
