= Toome Upper =

Barony in County Antrim, Northern Ireland

Toome Upper Tuaim Uachtarach (Irish)
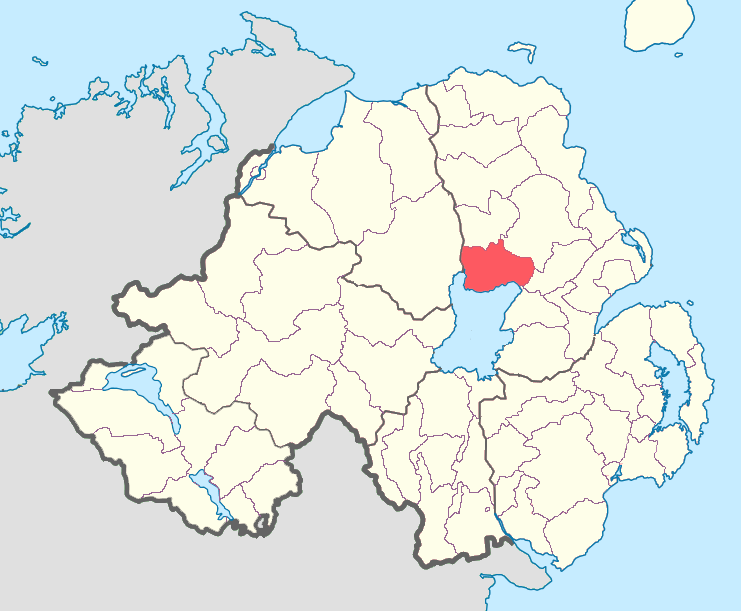
- Location of Toome Upper, County Antrim, Northern Ireland.
- Sovereign state: United Kingdom
- Country: Northern Ireland
- County: Antrim

Toome Upper is a barony in County Antrim, Northern Ireland. To its south lies Lough Neagh, and it is bordered by five other baronies: Toome Lower to the north; Antrim Lower to the north-east; Antrim Upper to the east; Massereene Lower to the south-east; and Loughinsholin to the south-east. Toome Upper also formed part of the medieval territories known as the Route and Clandeboye.

== List of settlements ==
Below is a list of settlements in Toome Upper:

=== Towns ===
- Ahoghill (also part of baronies of Toome Lower and Antrim Lower)
- Antrim (also part of barony of Toome Lower)
- Milltown
- Randalstown

=== Population centres ===
- Crosskeys
- Toome
- Newferry
- Whiteside's Corner

== List of civil parishes ==
Below is a list of civil parishes in Toome Upper:

- Antrim (split with barony of Antrim Upper)
- Ballyscullion (split with barony of Loughinsholin)
- Cranfield
- Drummaul
- Duneane
- Grange of Ballyscullion
- Grange of Shilvodan
