= Randalstown =

Town in County Antrim, Northern Ireland

Coordinates: 54.746°N 6.306°W

Randalstown: Irish: Baile Raghnaill; Scots: Randalstoon
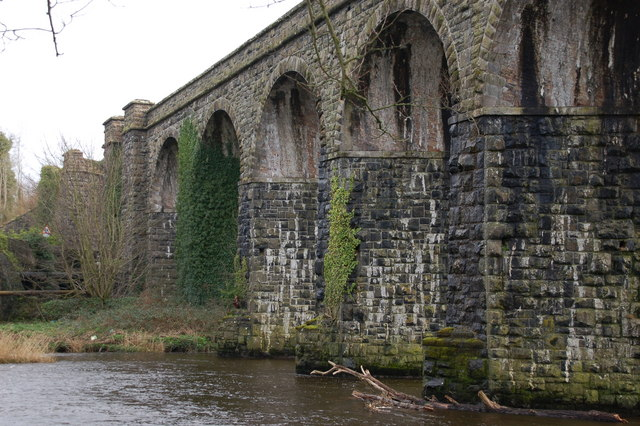
- The former Northern Counties Committee railway viaduct at Randalstown railway station.

- Location within Northern Ireland
- Population: 5,151 (2021 census)
  - Belfast: 19 mi (31 km)
- District: Antrim and Newtownabbey
- County: County Antrim
- Country: Northern Ireland
- Sovereign state: United Kingdom
- Post town: ANTRIM
- Postcode district: BT41
- Dialling code: 028
- Police: Northern Ireland
- Fire: Northern Ireland
- Ambulance: Northern Ireland
- UK Parliament: South Antrim

Randalstown (Irish: Baile Raghnaill) is a small town and townland in County Antrim, Northern Ireland, between Antrim and Toome. The town, which contains a prominent disused railway viaduct, lies beside Lough Neagh and the Shane's Castle estate. Randalstown is bypassed by the M22 motorway with junctions at both the eastern and western ends of the town. It had a population of 5,151 people in the 2021 census.

== History ==
The townland of Randalstown was originally known as An Dún Mór ("the great fort"), anglicised as Dunmore. This refers to a medieval motte-and-bailey castle built by the Irish on the west bank of the river Main just south of the town. A castle known as Edenduffcarrick, later Shane's Castle, was built near Randalstown in the 14th century by the O'Neills of Clannaboy.

From at least the 1650s the town was known as "Iron Mills" (Muilinn Iarainn in Irish, anglicised "Mullynieren"). In 1667, the town was created a free borough and was officially renamed Randalstown. It was renamed to mark the marriage of Randal MacDonnell, 1st Marquess of Antrim to Rose O'Neill of Shane's Castle.

The 1798 United Irishmen rebellion began in Antrim following a meeting to prepare for revolt by the Ulster Directory on 1 February 1798, at McClean's Inn, Randalstown. Robert McClean's "Great Inn" had long been an Irish Volunteers meeting place. Following his death in 1790, his son Francis became the proprietor.

Dunmore Park was used as a training camp for the Ulster Volunteers during the Irish Home Rule crisis.

Randalstown has a strong history of linen and iron industries. A memorial to this history is in the middle of the town and made from the original turbine used to generate mains electricity for the town and items salvaged from the Old Bleach Linen Company founded by James Webb in 1864. An old linen mill chimney from the Old Bleach factory can be seen from most parts of the town. The Dorma Old Bleach factory which operated from a neighbouring site closed down in 2002.

On 1 October 1989, a Provisional Irish Republican Army (IRA) car bomb exploded outside the town's police station on New Street causing serious damage to nearby property.

On 8 January 2010, PSNI Constable Peadar Heffron was seriously injured as a bomb exploded under his car on the Milltown Road near Randalstown. Dissident republicans were blamed for the attack.

== Demography ==
=== 2021 census ===
National Identity of Randalstown residents (2021)
Nationality	Per cent
British	36.9%
Northern Irish	33.8%
Irish	31.0%

On census day (21 March 2021) the usually resident population of Randalstown was 5,151. Of these:

- 55.39% belong to or were brought up Catholic and 35.14% belong to or were brought up in a 'Protestant and other (non-Catholic) Christian (including Christian related)'.
- 36.94% indicated that they had a British national identity, 30.98% had an Irish national identity and 33.76% had a Northern Irish national identity.

=== 2011 census ===
National Identity of Randalstown residents (2011)
Nationality	Per cent
British	46.3%
Northern Irish	32.9%
Irish	24.3%

On census day (27 March 2011) the usually resident population of Randalstown was 5,126 accounting for 0.28% of the NI total. Of these:

- 99.02% were from the white (including Irish Traveller) ethnic group
- 54.74% belong to or were brought up Catholic and 39.82% belong to or were brought up in a 'Protestant and other (non-Catholic) Christian (including Christian related)'
- 46.29% indicated that they had a British national identity, 24.33% had an Irish national identity and 32.91% had a Northern Irish national identity.
- 10.67% had some knowledge of Irish; 9.30% had some knowledge of Ulster-Scots; and 4.72% did not have English as their first language.

== Transport ==
Randalstown is served by the A6, B52 and B93 roads and the M22 motorway.

Ulsterbus has a number of bus routes that operate through Randalstown. These include the 110/c/d/e/f/210a (Cookstown-Antrim bus and railway station), and 122 (Ballymena bus and railway station).

The town used to have an active railway station which opened in 1848 by the Belfast and Ballymena Railway. The station connected the town to Belfast, Antrim, Magherafelt and Cookstown. The line was closed to passengers in 1950 and then completely in 1959 and has been disused ever since. The viaduct has since become a linear park.

== Places of interest ==
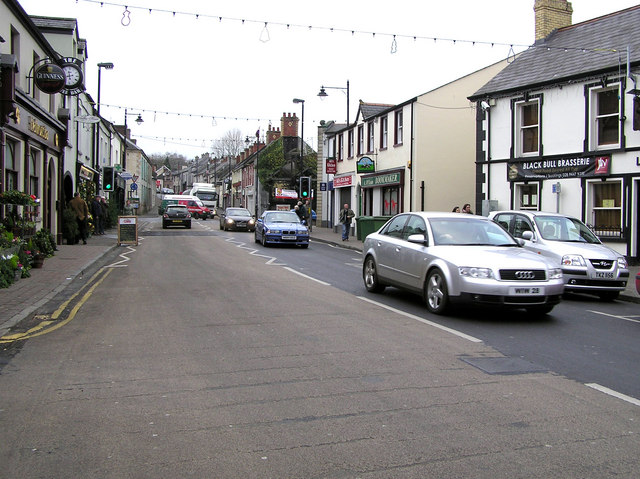
Lower Main Street in Randalstown

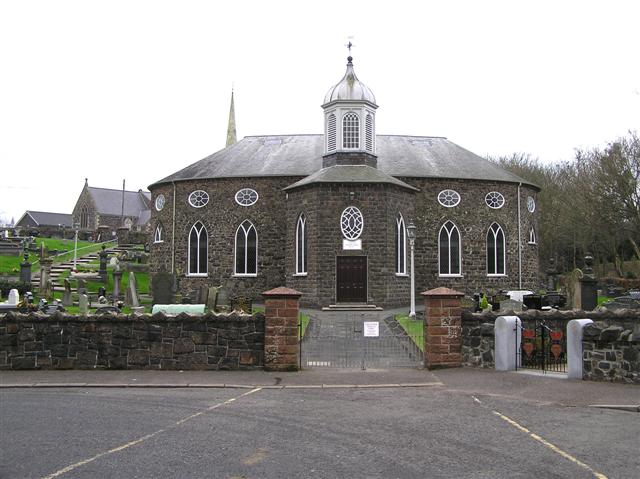
OC Presbyterian Church

- The Tudor style gateway to the Shane's Castle estate is in the town.
- Randalstown OC Presbyterian Church is an example of Irish Gothic church architecture.
- Around the corner from the gateway is the seven-piered, viaduct built in 1855 to carry the railway line over the River Main. This has had a new bridge installed and a walk path created as part of the local healthy walking areas.
- Craigmore Fishery, a fly fishing facility, is located on the outskirts of town.
- "World of Owls", Northern Ireland's only owl, bird of prey and exotic animal conservation centre is located next to Randalstown Forest.
- Caddy, a hamlet 3 miles north of the Randalstown centre, was site of a new school in 1908. and also a centre of beekeeping in the 1950s.

== Notable residents ==
- John Bodkin Adams, a British doctor and suspected serial killer, was born to a Plymouth Brethren family in Randalstown on 21 January 1899 and lived here until 1901. He was charged in 1957 with the murder of two patients but was acquitted. He was, however, suspected of causing the death of 163 other patients.
- Lady Moyra Campbell, maid of honour at the coronation of Elizabeth II
- Alan Jones, Professor of Architecture at Queen's University Belfast, past president of the Royal Society of Ulster Architects and was elected the 77th President of the Royal Institute of British Architects for 1 September 2019 – 2021.
- Gladys Maccabe (1918–2018), artist, journalist and founder of The Ulster Society of Women Artists
- Molly McKenna, trampoline gymnast.
- Laurence McKeown, author, playwright, screenwriter, and former member of the IRA who took part in the 1981 Irish hunger strike, striking for 70 days. In 1995 he co-founded the Belfast Film Festival.
- Colin Wallace, a former member of Army Intelligence in Northern Ireland and a psychological warfare specialist.

== Education ==
Primary schools in the area include Mount St. Michael's Primary School, Maine Integrated Primary School and Randalstown Central Primary School. The latter is a mixed non-denominational primary school within the North Eastern Education and Library Board area.

St. Benedict's College is a secondary school in Randalstown.

== See also ==
- List of localities in Northern Ireland by population
- List of towns and villages in Northern Ireland
- List of townlands of County Antrim
- Market houses in Northern Ireland
