= Upperlands railway station =

Former rail facility in Northern Ireland

Upperlands

General information
- Location: Culnady Road; Upperlands, County Londonderry; Northern Ireland
- Coordinates: 54.8774°N 6.6427°W

Other information
- Status: Disused

History
- Original company: Derry Central Railway
- Pre-grouping: Belfast and Northern Counties Railway
- Post-grouping: Northern Counties Committee

Key dates
- 18 December 1880: Station opens
- 28 August 1950: Station closes to passengers
- 1 October 1959: Station closes
Location

Upperlands railway station was on the Derry Central Railway which ran from Magherafelt to Macfin Junction in Northern Ireland. The station served Upperlands.

== History ==
The station was opened by the Derry Central Railway on 18 December 1880. It was taken over by the Northern Counties Committee in September 1901.

The station closed to passengers on 28 August 1950 when the Ulster Transport Authority closed the line to passenger traffic and then closed completely on 1 October 1959.

== Routes ==
Preceding station	Historical railways	Following station
Maghera; Line and station closed	Derry Central Railway; Magherafelt-Macfin	Kilrea; Line and station closed
Maghera; Line and station closed	Northern Counties Committee; Derry Central line	Tamlaght; Line and station closed
