= Garvagh railway station =

Railway station in Northern Ireland

Garvagh

General information
- Location: Station Rd., Garvagh, County Londonderry; Northern Ireland
- Coordinates: 54.9883°N 6.6768°W

Other information
- Status: Disused

History
- Original company: Derry Central Railway
- Pre-grouping: Belfast and Northern Counties Railway
- Post-grouping: Belfast and Northern Counties Railway

Key dates
- 18 February 1880: Station opens
- 28 August 1950: Station closes
Location

Garvagh railway station was on the Derry Central Railway which ran from Magherafelt to Macfin Junction in Northern Ireland. It served the nearby town of Garvagh, about 1 km away.

== History ==
The station was opened by the Derry Central Railway on 18 February 1880. It was taken over by the Northern Counties Committee in September 1901.

It comprised a station house, signal box and goods shed (extant) 54.9875°N 6.675538°W

The station closed to passengers on 28 August 1950 under the Ulster Transport Authority.

== Routes ==
Preceding station	Historical railways	Following station
Kilrea	Derry Central Railway; Magherafelt-Macfin Junction	Moneycarrie
