= Maghera railway station =

Railway station in Maghera, Northern Ireland

Maghera

General information
- Location: Station Road; Maghera, County Londonderry; Northern Ireland
- Coordinates: 54.8452°N 6.6682°W

Other information
- Status: Disused

History
- Original company: Derry Central Railway
- Pre-grouping: Belfast and Northern Counties Railway
- Post-grouping: Northern Counties Committee

Key dates
- 18 December 1880: Station opens
- 28 August 1950: Station closes to passengers
- 1 October 1959: Station closes
Location

Maghera railway station was on the Derry Central Railway which ran from Magherafelt to Macfin Junction in Northern Ireland.

== History ==
The station was opened by the Derry Central Railway on 18 December 1880. It was taken over by the Northern Counties Committee in September 1901.

The station closed to passengers on 28 August 1950 by the Ulster Transport Authority when they closed the line to passenger traffic. The line then closed completely on 1 October 1959. The station building is now part of the Maghera Business Centre and the goods shed is preserved at the Downpatrick and County Down Railway.

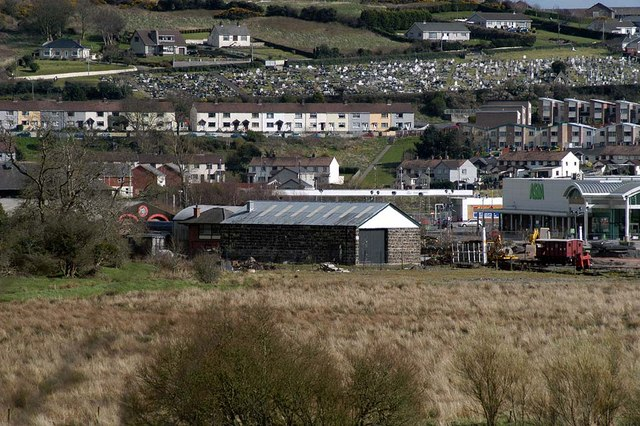
Maghera Goods Shed, now moved to Downpatrick railway station on the Downpatrick and County Down Railway.

== Routes ==
Preceding station	Historical railways	Following station
Knockloughrim	Derry Central Railway; Magherafelt-Macfin Junction	Upperlands
