= Tamlaght railway station =

Railway station in County Londonderry, Northern Ireland

Tamlaght Tamlaght Halt

General information
- Location: Tamlaght Road, Tamlaght, County Londonderry; Northern Ireland
- Coordinates: 54.913643°N 6.592980°W
- Platforms: 1

Other information
- Status: Demolished

History
- Pre-grouping: Northern Counties Committee

Key dates
- 1 May 1917: Station opens
- 28 August 1950: Station closes
Location

Tamlaght was a level crossing halt on the Derry Central Railway which ran from Magherafelt to Macfin Junction in Northern Ireland.

== History ==
The station was opened by the Northern Counties Committee on 1 May 1917. It had a single platform with a concrete shelter.

The halt was closed by the Ulster Transport Authority on 28 August 1950, when the line lost its passenger traffic.

== Routes ==
Preceding station	Historical railways	Following station
Upperlands; Line and station closed	Northern Counties Committee; Derry Central	Kilrea; Line and station closed
