= Moneycarrie railway station =

Railway station in County Londonderry, Northern Ireland

Moneycarrie

General information
- Location: County Londonderry; Northern Ireland
- Coordinates: 55.0115°N 6.6665°W

Other information
- Status: Disused

History
- Original company: Derry Central Railway
- Pre-grouping: Belfast and Northern Counties Railway
- Post-grouping: Belfast and Northern Counties Railway

Key dates
- 1 May 1894: Station opens
- 28 August 1950: Station closes
Location

Moneycarrie railway station was on the Derry Central Railway which ran from Magherafelt to Macfin Junction in Northern Ireland.

== History ==
The station was opened by the Derry Central Railway on 1 May 1894. It was taken over by the Northern Counties Committee in September 1901.

The station closed to passengers on 28 August 1950.

Preceding station	Historical railways	Following station
Garvagh	Derry Central Railway; Magherafelt-Macfin Junction	Aghadowey
