= Knockloughrim railway station =

Station in County Londonderry, Northern Ireland

Knockloughrim

General information
- Location: Derganagh Road; Knockloughrim, County Londonderry; Northern Ireland
- Coordinates: 54.8131°N 6.6250°W

Other information
- Status: Disused

History
- Original company: Derry Central Railway
- Pre-grouping: Belfast and Northern Counties Railway
- Post-grouping: Northern Counties Committee

Key dates
- 18 December 1880: Station opens
- 28 August 1950: Station closes to passengers
- 1 October 1959: Station closes
Location

Knockloughrim railway station was on the Derry Central Railway which ran from Magherafelt to Macfin Junction in Northern Ireland. The station served Knockloughrim.

== History ==
The station was opened by the Derry Central Railway on 18 December 1880. It was taken over by the Northern Counties Committee in September 1901.

The station closed to passengers on 28 August 1950. when they closed the line to passenger traffic. The line then closed completely on 1 October 1959. The station building is now a private residence, while the A6 road has been built along part of the trackbed heading south towards Magherafelt.

== Routes ==
| Preceding station | Historical railways | Following station |
|---|---|---|
| Magherafelt | Derry Central Railway; Magherafelt-Macfin Junction | Maghera |
