= Aghadowey railway station =

Station which served Aghadowey in County Londonderry, Northern Ireland

Aghadowey Achadh Dubhthaigh
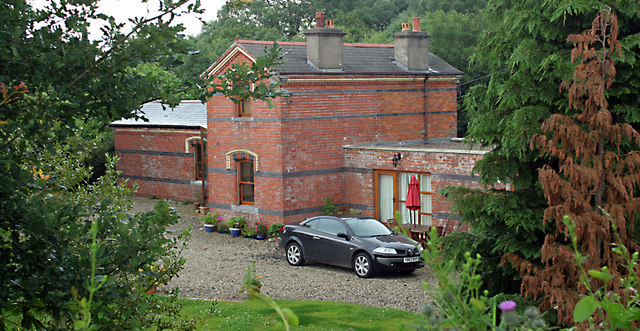
- Since its closure, Aghadowey Railway Station has also been a doctor's surgery and is now a private home. Photo taken on 16 July 2007.

General information
- Location: 4 Moneybrannon Road; Aghadowey, County Londonderry, Northern Ireland; UK
- Coordinates: 55.0343°N 6.6234°W

History
- Opened: February 1880
- Closed: 20 August 1950
- Original company: Derry Central Railway
- Pre-grouping: Northern Counties Committee
Location

Aghadowey was a station which served Aghadowey in County Londonderry, Northern Ireland.

== History ==
The station was opened by the Derry Central Railway. The railway was taken over by the Belfast and Northern Counties Railway in 1901, which became the Northern Counties Committee following its acquisition by the Midland Railway. The NCC then passed to the Ulster Transport Authority under whose management it was closed.

== Routes ==
| Preceding station | Historical railways | Following station |
|---|---|---|
| Moneycarrie; Line and station closed | Derry Central Railway; Magherafelt-Macfin | Macfin; Line and station closed |
| Moneycarrie; Line and station closed | Northern Counties Committee; Magherafelt-Macfin | Curragh Bridge Halt; Line and station closed |
