= Curragh Bridge Halt railway station =

Railway station in County Londonderry, Northern Ireland

Curragh Bridge Halt

General information
- Location: County Londonderry; Northern Ireland
- Coordinates: 55.0574°N 6.6089°W

Other information
- Status: Disused

History
- Original company: Derry Central Railway
- Pre-grouping: Belfast and Northern Counties Railway
- Post-grouping: Belfast and Northern Counties Railway

Key dates
- 1 December 1908: Station opens
- 28 August 1950: Station closes
Location

Curragh Bridge Halt railway station was on the Derry Central Railway which ran from Magherafelt to Macfin Junction in Northern Ireland.

== History ==
The station was opened by the Derry Central Railway on 1 December 1908. It was taken over by the Northern Counties Committee in September 1901.

The station closed to passengers on 28 August 1950.

Preceding station	Historical railways	Following station
Aghadowey	Derry Central Railway; Magherafelt-Macfin Junction	Macfin
