= Aghadowey civil parish =

Civil and ecclesiastical parish in County Londonderry, Northern Ireland

Aghadowey
- civil parish
- Coordinates: 55.029°N 6.648°W
- Sovereign state: United Kingdom
- Country: Northern Ireland
- County: Londonderry
- Barony: Coleraine

Aghadowey is a civil and ecclesiastical parish in County Londonderry, Northern Ireland.

== Townlands ==
The parish comprises 66 townlands:

- Aghadowey
- Ardreagh
- Ballinrees
- Ballybritain
- Ballycaghan
- Ballyclough
- Ballydevitt
- Ballygawley
- Ballylintagh
- Ballymenagh
- Ballynacally More
- Ballywillin
- Bovagh
- Caheny
- Carnrallagh
- Carranroe
- Clagan
- Clarehill
- Clintagh
- Collins
- Coolhill
- Cornamuclagh
- Craiglea Glebe
- Craigmore
- Crevolea
- Crosscanley Glebe
- Crossmakeever
- Culdrum
- Cullycapple
- Cullyramer
- Dernagross
- Droghed
- Drumacrow
- Drumeil
- Drumsteeple
- Glenbuck
- Glencurb
- Glenkeen
- Gorran
- Gortin Coolhill
- Gortin Mayoghill
- Keely
- Killeague
- Killykergan
- Kiltest
- Knockaduff
- Landmore
- Lisboy
- Lisnamuck
- Managher
- Mayboy
- Mayoghill
- Meavemanougher
- Meencraig
- Menagh
- Moneybrannon
- Moneycarrie Lower
- Mullaghinch
- Mullan
- Mullinabrone
- Risk
- Rusky
- Scalty
- Seygorry
- Shanlongford
- Tamlaght

== See also ==
- List of civil parishes of County Londonderry
- List of townlands in County Londonderry
