= The Troubles in Garvagh =

Incidents in Garvagh, Northern Ireland during the Troubles

The Troubles in Garvagh affected Garvagh, County Londonderry, Northern Ireland, during the period of ethno-nationalist conflict known as The Troubles, which affected Northern Ireland from 1968 to 1998.

The Troubles claimed the lives of five people in Garvagh. All were Protestant and all were killed by the Provisional Irish Republican Army (IRA). A corporal in the Ulster Defence Regiment (UDR), John Conley (43), killed by a car bomb on 23 July 1974. An off-duty Royal Ulster Constabulary (RUC) constable, Norman Annett (56), was shot dead on 1 July 1989. The first civilian casualty was Arthur McGraw (29), shot dead at his home on the Moneycarrie Road on 10 August 1979. A Protestant civilian, Winston McCaughey, was shot dead in Boveedy, three miles east of Garvagh, but closer to Kilrea, on 11 November 1976.

On 20 April 1994, Alan Smyth (40) and John McCloy (28) were shot dead by the IRA while sitting in a stationary car on Main Street, Garvagh. A third occupant of the vehicle was also injured in the attack. Both were civilians.

In May 1994, at a special court in Coleraine, Patrick Kelly (29) and Liam Averill (29), both of Maghera, County Londonderry, were accused of murdering Smyth and McCloy, and of the attempted murder of the third occupant of the vehicle. They were remanded in custody to appear at a court in Belfast in May 1994. Averill was sentenced to life imprisonment shortly before the IRA announced its 1994 ceasefire. However, in 1997 he escaped from jail and was later reported to be living in County Donegal in the Republic of Ireland.
