= Kilrea railway station =

Railway station in County Londonderry, Northern Ireland

Kilrea

General information
- Location: Drumagarner Road; Kilrea, County Londonderry; Northern Ireland
- Coordinates: 54.9475°N 6.5606°W

Other information
- Status: Disused

History
- Original company: Derry Central Railway
- Pre-grouping: Belfast and Northern Counties Railway
- Post-grouping: Northern Counties Committee

Key dates
- 18 February 1880: Station opens
- 28 August 1950: Station closes to passengers
- 1 October 1959: Station closes
Location

Kilrea railway station was on the Derry Central Railway which ran from Magherafelt to Macfin Junction in Northern Ireland.

== History ==
The station was opened by the Derry Central Railway on 18 February 1880. It was taken over by the Northern Counties Committee in September 1901.

The station closed to passengers on 28 August 1950 by the Ulster Transport Authority following the line's closure to passenger traffic (and complete closure north of the station) and then closed completely on 1 October 1959 with the line's complete closure.

== Routes ==
Preceding station	Historical railways	Following station
Tamlaght	Derry Central Railway; Magherafelt-Macfin Junction	Garvagh
