= First Kilrea Presbyterian Church =

Church in County Londonderry, Northern Ireland

Coordinates: 54.9503°N 6.556°W

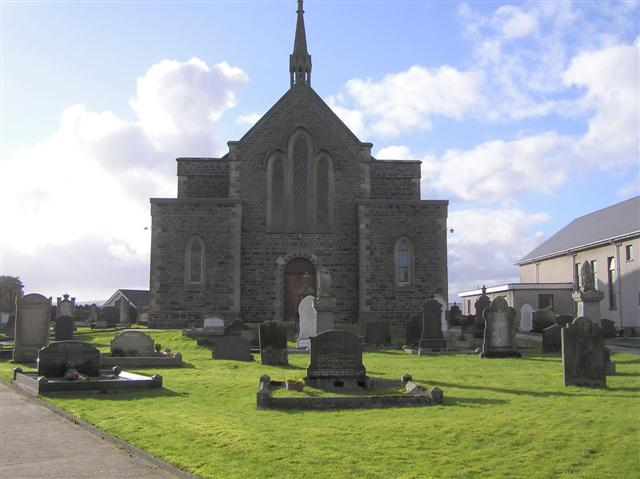

Kilrea Presbyterian Church is a church building of the Coleraine and Limavady presbytery of Presbyterian Church in Ireland. It is located in the village of Kilrea, County Londonderry, Northern Ireland. In January 2026 First Kilrea Presbyterian Church was united with Boveedy and Second Kilrea congregations to form the new Kilrea Presbyterian Church.

== History ==
The first Meeting House built for Presbyterians in the Kilrea district was at Moyknock. In 1642 the first church building at Moyknock was burned down. A second church was built in the townland of Boveedy, just outside modern-day Kilrea. This building served the parishes of Kilrea, Tamlaght, Boveedy and Desertoghill.

The third meeting house, the first in Kilrea, was built in 1770. The building stood a short distance in front of the present church.

The present-day church building, or "Scot's Kirk" (English: Scottish [or 'Presbyterian'] Church) as it was called, had its foundation stone laid in 1837 and opened for worship in 1839. The funding for the church was provided by the Mercers' Company and built to a design by William Barnes of London.

== Ministers ==
=== Boveedy ===
Ministers
| Incumbency | Minister |
|---|---|
| 1680–1690 | William Gilchrist |
| 1697–1729 | Matthew Clerk |
| 1732–1741 | Robert Whirling |
| 1744–1748 | Alexander Cumming |
| 1749–1779 | John Smyth |
| 1781–1848 | Adam Boyle |
| 1841–1844 | William Denham |
| 1845–1847 | D. T. Boyd |
| 1848–1887 | James Gilmore |
| 1888–1931 | W. J. Hill |
| 1923–1929 | J. A. R. Boyd |
| 1930–1972 | G. R. M. McDowell |
| 1969–1979 | S. W. M. McClintock |
| 1980–1995 | Gordon |
| 1996–2005 | Stewart MacKay |
| 2009– | Trevor John McCormick |

=== First Kilrea ===
Ministers
| Incumbency | Minister |
|---|---|
| c1680 | William Gilchrist |
| 1697–1729 | Matthew Clerk |
| 1732–1741 | Robert Wirling |
| 1744–1748 | Alexander Cumming |
| 1749–1785 | John Smith |
| 1789–1794 | Arthur McMahon |
| 1794–1821 | John Smith |
| 1825–1851 | Hugh Walker Rodgers |
| 1852–1869 | James Maxwell Rodgers |
| 1869–1873 | James Heron |
| 1874–1932 | James Stewart |
| 1925–1962 | Hans Hadden |
| 1963–1967 | Ivan James Wilson |
| 1967–1975 | John Oscar Bridgett |
| 1976–1985 | Ivan James Wilson |
| 1986– | Trevor John McCormick |

=== Second Kilrea ===
Ministers
| Incumbency | Minister |
|---|---|
| 1833–1839 | James McCammon |
| 1840–1883 | Joseph Dickey |
| 1884–1888 | F. O. M. Watters |
| 1888–1892 | John Colhoun |
| 1892–1902 | Alexander Gallagher |
| 1902–? | W. J. Farley |
