= Tamlaght, County Londonderry =

Village in County Londonderry, Northern Ireland

Coordinates: 54.898°N 6.554°W

Tamlaght: Tamlaght O'Crilly
- Village, townland, civil parish
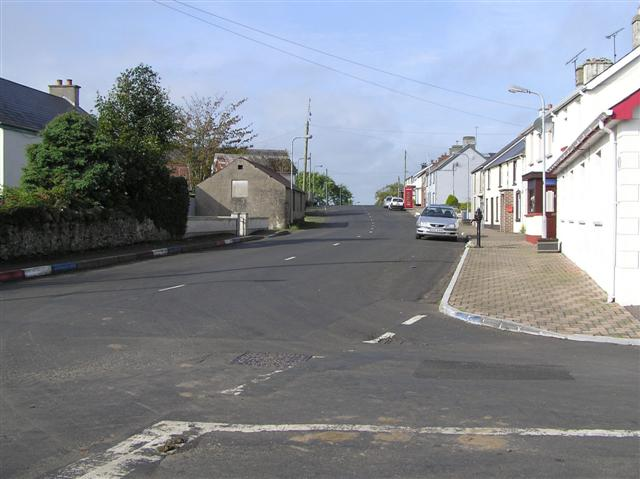
- View from the junction of the Tamlaght Road and Drumlane Road

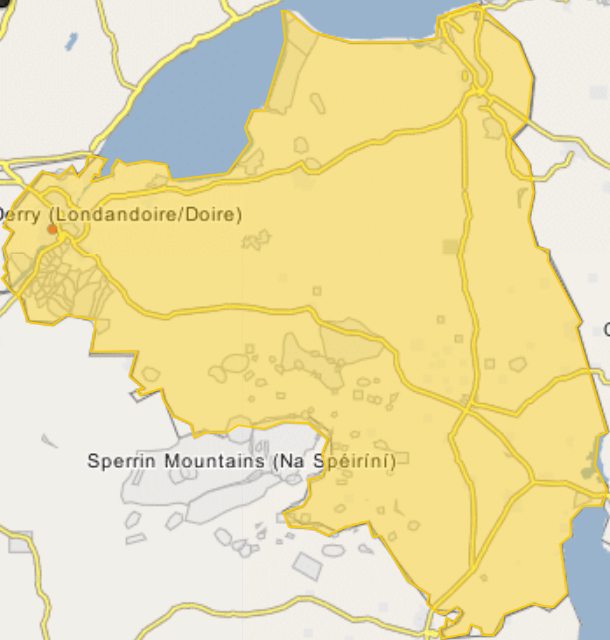
- Location within Northern Ireland
- District: Mid Ulster
- County: County Londonderry
- Country: Northern Ireland
- Sovereign state: United Kingdom
- Post town: MAGHERA
- Postcode district: BT46
- Dialling code: 028
- Police: Northern Ireland
- Fire: Northern Ireland
- Ambulance: Northern Ireland
- UK Parliament: Mid-Ulster
- NI Assembly: Mid-Ulster

Tamlaght (from Irish Tamhlacht 'plague burial place'), also Tamlaght O'Crilly, is a small village, townland and civil parish in County Londonderry, Northern Ireland. In the 2021 Census it had a population of 121 people. It is situated within the district of Mid Ulster, and within the Tamlaght O'Crilly ward of Mid-Ulster District Council.

== History ==
Tamlaght originally crossed the boundaries of the baronies of Coleraine and Loughinsholin. Tamlaght was originally known as "Tamlaght McNinagh". It was later renamed as Tamlaght O'Crilly after the O'Crilly family whom traditionally served as Erenaghs for the parish with a number of the O'Crilly family becoming priests. In 1745, residents from both Tamlaght and Kilrea signed a joint petition professing loyalty to the Crown and opposing the Jacobite Rebellion. At its height, it had a population of 10,460 in 1841. Around this time it had a Covenanters meeting house, a Presbyterian Church in Ireland church and two Roman Catholic chapels.

== Amenities ==
The local primary school was Drumard Primary School (controlled), which closed in 2013. The village is also part of the Church of Ireland's Diocese of Derry and Raphoe. Tamlaght annually holds an agricultural fair in May.

== Railways ==
Tamlaght railway station was opened by the Northern Counties Committee on 1 May 1917. The station closed to passengers on 28 August 1950 by the Ulster Transport Authority due to the station becoming unprofitable for the Derry Central Railway due to the improvements in roadways and busses becoming the main means of transport in County Londonderry.

== See also ==
- List of villages in Northern Ireland
- List of civil parishes of County Londonderry
- List of civil parishes of County Tyrone
- Tamlaght, County Fermanagh
- Tallaght, County Dublin
