= The Troubles in Magherafelt =

Incidents in Magherafelt, Northern Ireland during the Troubles

A total of eleven people were killed in violence relating to the Northern Irish Troubles in the town of Magherafelt, County Londonderry. Nine were killed by the Irish Republican Army (IRA), including three IRA members killed by the premature explosion of their own bomb while travelling through Magherafelt. One was killed by a non-specific republican group and another by the opposing Ulster Freedom Fighters (UFF). Of the others killed by the IRA, four were Protestant civilians. Three of them were killed in two separate car bomb explosions. The fourth Protestant civilian was shot because his firm was a contractor for the British Army and the Royal Ulster Constabulary (RUC). The IRA's other two victims were both Protestant members of the security forces, one from the RUC and the other from the Ulster Defence Regiment. Both were off duty when killed. The man killed by the UFF was a Sinn Féin councillor who was shot in his workplace. The man killed by the non-specific republican group was a Catholic civilian.

18 December 1971: three IRA volunteers (James Sheridan, John Bateson and Martin Lee) died in Magherafelt, County Londonderry, when the bomb they were transporting exploded prematurely.

On 23 May 1993, a 500-pound IRA car bomb caused extensive damage to the commercial centre of the town. The bomb was placed outside the Ulsterbus depot on Broad Street, a main thoroughfare of Magherafelt. The bus station was entirely demolished by the blast and the town's Ulster Bank branch was damaged extensively; both were since redeveloped. Seamus Heaney wrote about the bombing in his poem Two Lorries.

On 29 September 2000, Patrick Quinn, a Catholic, was shot and killed by an unspecified Republican group in the Depot Bar.
