= Billie Nicholl =

Prospector, goldmine developer

William Sharman Crawford Nicholl (c. 1851–1937) was a New Zealand prospector and gold mine developer. He was born in Garvagh, County Londonderry, Ireland.
