= The Battle of Garvagh =

19th century Irish folk song

"The Battle of Garvagh" is a traditional Northern Irish song of the nineteenth century.

It refers to the events of 26 July 1813 in Garvagh, a settlement in County Londonderry about nine miles south of Coleraine. A clash between Catholic Ribbonmen and Protestant Orangemen occurred the day before the July fair was to be held in the town. The Ribbonmen, estimated to number up to two hundred strong but armed only with farm implements, planned to attack and destroy a tavern frequented by the Orangemen. However the locals who were heavily armed had been warned and were waiting for the Ribbonmen, driving them off killing one and wounding several.

Written from a Loyalist viewpoint, the song celebrates the victory of the Protestants and their subsequent acquittal by a jury after being prosecuted by the Police.

== Bibliography ==
- Niall Whelehan. Transnational Perspectives on Modern Irish History. Routledge, 2014.
