= Moneydig Presbyterian Church =

Coordinates: 54.9954°N 6.6086°W

Ministers of Moneydig congregation
Installation	Minister
2008	Rev JR Ian Harbinson BA BD
2005	Vacant
1994	Rev John George Johnston BSc MA.R
1986	Rev Warren Porter BA BD
1976	Rev Aylmer Armstrong DipA
1964	Rev Ernest James Ferguson
1956	Mr James Warden
1936	Rev Henry Cooke Stuart GAMC
1931	Rev Gordan Thompson Clements DD
1923	Rev William John Latimer
1919	Rev William H Stewart BA
1863	Mr William McCay
1857	Rev Henry H Finlay
1837	Rev Patrick Roger Killough

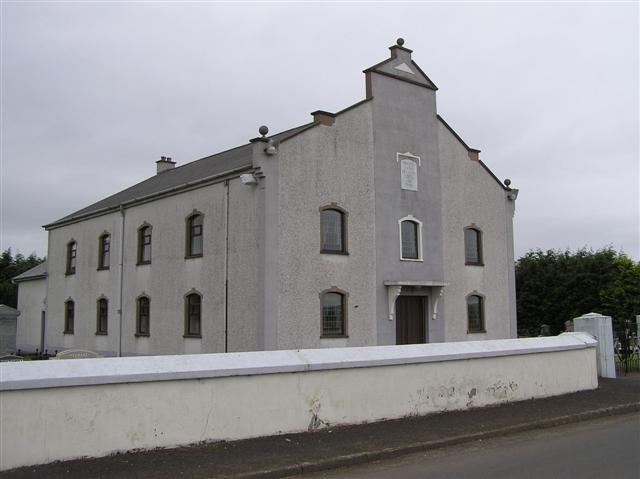
Moneydig Presbyterian Church

Moneydig Presbyterian Church is a church building of the Coleraine and Limavady presbytery of the Presbyterian Church in Ireland. It is located outside Garvagh, County Londonderry, Northern Ireland.

== History ==
There had been Presbyterian worship occurring in Moneydig in the early 1800s with the congregation worshipping in the local school hall. At the behest of George Orr, one of the Elders, it was decided to build a church. Moneydig Presbyterian Church was established in 1836 as part of the Presbyterian Church in Ireland's Synod of Ulster. The current church building was complete the same year. The church building was constructed as a gabled four bay hall. The congregation was created from parts of the adjoining parishes of Aghadowey, Garvagh and Kilrea. During the 1800s, the church was used as a meeting place for members of the Temperance movement in Ireland. To celebrate the centenary of the church in 1936, a new cinema-style screen was installed. The current minister is the Rev James Richard Ian Harbinson who was installed on 27 June 2008. The church engages in minister-exchange programmes with churches in Canada.

The church was surveyed to be graded for listed building status by the Department for Communities in 2012, however the Department declined to list the building after the initial survey on the grounds that a large majority of the church's original fabric had been removed and replaced with modern substitutes. The church is registered with the Charity Commission for Northern Ireland.

== See also ==
- Presbyterian Church in Ireland
- Garvagh
