= Garvagh =

Village in County Londonderry, Northern Ireland

Coordinates: 54.981751°N 6.684494°W

Garvagh: Irish: Garbhachadh
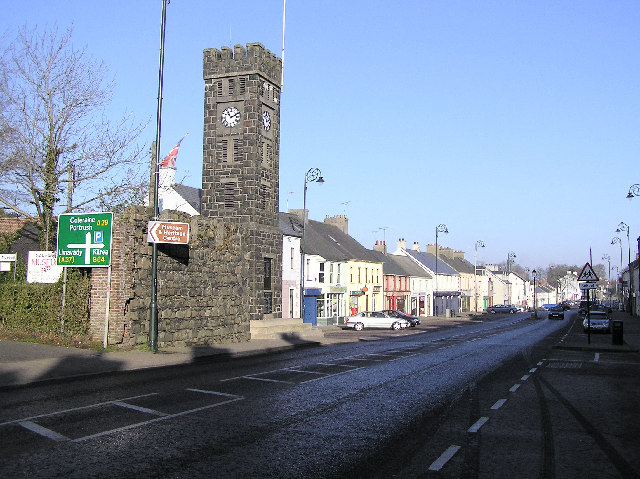

- Location within Northern Ireland
- Population: 1,252 (2021 census)
  - Belfast: 50 mi (80 km)
- District: Causeway Coast and Glens
- County: County Londonderry
- Country: Northern Ireland
- Sovereign state: United Kingdom
- Post town: Coleraine
- Postcode district: BT51
- Dialling code: 028, +44 28
- UK Parliament: East Londonderry
- NI Assembly: East Londonderry
- Website: www.garvaghtown.com

Garvagh (from Irish Garbhach, meaning 'rough place' or Garbhachadh meaning "rough field") is a village in County Londonderry, Northern Ireland. It is on the banks of the Agivey River, 18 kilometres (11 mi) south of Coleraine on the A29 route. In the 2021 census it had a population of 1,252. It is situated within Causeway Coast and Glens district.

== History ==
Garvagh was important from very early times, and later rebuilt as a Plantation town, as its broad main street and neatly planned buildings evidence.

It was founded in the early 17th century by George Canning from Warwickshire, agent for the Ironmonger's Company of London, it was later grown into a middling-size market town by the Cannings. A striking feature of the town is the stone clock tower with an attractive clock and castellations, which dominates the main route through the town and also serves as the district cenotaph.

On 26 July 1813 the Battle of Garvagh, a skirmish between Catholic Ribbonmen attempting to burn a tavern frequented by Orangemen, and the Orangemen themselves, took place. The town has been immortalised in the famous Protestant folk-song "The Battle of Garvagh".

=== The Troubles ===
The Troubles was an ethno-nationalist conflict in Northern Ireland during the late 20th century, from 1968 to 1998. During that time, individuals and groups in the Garvagh area inevitably became involved or affected.

=== Post Troubles ===
The Garvagh and District Development Association- GADDA undertook a project to modernise the town in the late 1990s and early 2000s by installing new water mains, upgrading road surfaces, improving pedestrian surfaces, new street lighting, a new community building and a new toilet block, which were funded through various support channels: the Coleraine Borough Council, the Ireland Fund of America, the EU and the British Government.

In August 2009, more than 20 windows in Catholic owned businesses including a public house, butchers’ shop and cafe were smashed some time around 3am. Police investigated the attacks as sectarian hate crimes.

== Places of interest ==
- Garvagh Museum is a rural Folk Museum in the walled garden of Garvagh House, the former seat of the Canning family. George Canning was elevated to the peerage in 1818 and took the title Baron Garvagh. This walled garden has historic links with Donnchadh Ó Hámsaigh (aka Denis Hampson) the great blind harper who lived in three centuries, being born in 1695 and dying in 1807. George Canning, Dr Bacon and Squire Gage bought Hampson's first harp while he lived in Garvagh. At the entrance to the museum there is a memorial to Hempson in the form of a granite pillar. This unique collection holds almost two thousand artefacts which trace the history of the Bann Valley from 3000 BC through to the first half of the 20th century.
- Slagthaverty Dolmen is about three miles south of Garvagh.
- Garvagh Forest, the former estate of the Cannings covering over 2 square kilometres (0.77 sq mi), is on the western outskirts of Garvagh.
- The River Agivey flows through Garvagh. It is a well known river for Brown trout and Salmon.

== 2001 census ==
Garvagh is classified as a village by the Northern Ireland Statistics and Research Agency (NISRA) (i.e. with a population between 1,000 and 2,250 people). On census day (29 April 2001) there were 1,288 people living in Garvagh. Of these:

- 22.3% were aged under 16 years and 25.1% were aged 60 and over
- 46.7% of the population were male and 53.3% were female
- 25.0% were from a Catholic background and 74.0% were from a Protestant background
- 3.6% of people aged 16–74 were unemployed

== 2011 Census ==
On Census day in 2011:

- 24.5% were from a Catholic background and 71.2% were from a Protestant background

== Transport ==
Garvagh railway station -formerly on Station Road- opened on 18 February 1880 as part of the Derry Central Railway and was shut on 28 August 1950. Disused remnants of the track still remain in a few locations including several railway bridges.

There are several bus stops in Garvagh town operated through Ulsterbus, they are on Main Street and Bridge Street as well as several in the surrounding area.

== People ==
- Sir James Brown Dougherty KCB KCVO PC (1844–1934), clergyman, academic, civil servant and politician, born in Garvagh.
- Billie Nicholl (1851–1937), New Zealand prospector and gold mine developer
- Frederick William FitzSimons (1870–1951), South African naturalist, noted herpetologist, born in Garvagh
- John Laurence Rentoul (1845–1926), Presbyterian minister and poet, emigrated to Australia

== Education ==
In the 1930s, 1940s and 1950s there were two public schools in Garvagh. Garvagh Public Elementary School, which was the Presbyterian school, was at the Southerly end of the town. Garvagh Youth Club now occupies the premises.

The second school, which was known as the Canning Public Elementary School, was the Church of Ireland school, and was positioned where the Christian Workers Union Hall now stands.

In 1947 an Education Act was passed, changing education in Northern Ireland. Public Elementary schools were to be called Primary Schools, with pupils transferring at 11+ to Intermediate schools, Grammar schools, and Technical schools. This change took some time, as schools had to be planned and built. Garvagh Intermediate school opened in 1953. The primary school population fell as a result. Both primary schools continued to operate for some time, but eventually the Canning Primary School closed. Primary Education continued in Garvagh Primary School, but as housing development took place, the school could not cope with the numbers. Temporary accommodation was given in Garvagh Orange Hall.

In the grounds of Garvagh Intermediate School was the school, and Garvagh House, the former house of the Canning family, which contained some classrooms and flats for single female teachers. The house fell into disrepair over the years and was eventually demolished; in 1965 the County Londonderry Education Committee opened Garvagh Primary School on the site.

In the early 1970s, increased enrolment due to the raising of school leaving age led to the Education Committee transferring the primary school buildings to the Intermediate school, and in April 1973 a new Garvagh Primary School opened. It was built on Ashe's Meadow. Where the gates are, was the site of the old cinema (AVON - which stood for Allies Victory over Nazis). The school was of a new design, with three wings. Each wing consisted of three classrooms, lavatories and an open area. Apart from the classroom for P1, the classrooms had no doors. This was referred to as open plan.

Today, there are two schools in Garvagh: Garvagh Primary School, St Patrick's & St Joseph's Primary School (Glenullin). Garvagh High School closed on 31 August 2013 as a result of enrolment decline. In addition, the future of Garvagh Primary School is unclear as there are ongoing discussions regarding forming an amalgamation with Gorran Primary School, which lies just beyond the town vicinity.

Garvagh was one of the first towns to provide early year education in the area. The preschool, Garvagh Community Playgroup, was established in 1974.

== See also ==
- Ballerin and Glenullin, nearby rural districts
- Moneydig Presbyterian Church, outside the town
