= Hannah Shields =

Athlete and mountaineer from Northern Ireland

Personal information
- Born: c. 1965
- Education: Dominican College, Portstewart
- Occupation: Orthodontist

Sport
- Sport: Mountaineering, Running
- Coached by: Noel McMonagle, City of Derry Athletics Club

Hannah Shields (born c. 1965) is an athlete best known for becoming the first woman from Northern Ireland to reach the summit of Mount Everest in 2007 (at age 41). She was also the first Irish woman to ski to the North magnetic pole in 2004, racing with Chris van Tulleken as part of the Polar Challenge. Parts of their journey were recorded by the BBC for their 'Challenge' series. She has completed over 50 marathons and ultra-marathons.

Shields is an orthodontist, splitting her time between her orthodontal work, training and expeditions. She is considered to be one of Northern Ireland's top explorers. Hannah Shields was born in Kilrea and lives in Derry City.

== Early life ==
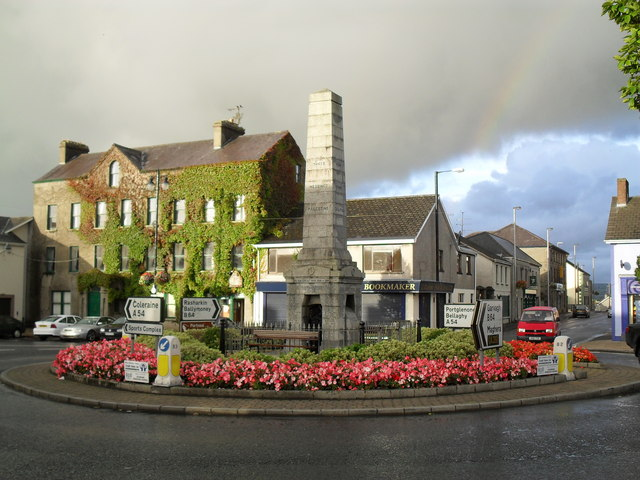
Shields' hometown of Kilrea.

Shields was born to parents Kevin (deceased) and Elizabeth (Betty) Shields, and grew up with six siblings. She is described being "quiet as a child" in an interview with Joanne Murphy for Tri Talking Sport in April 2021, and says that she was encouraged to participate in sport whilst growing up.

== Running ==
When she was 34, she started running with a club, which she has since represented at local and international level, having won national and international medals at several distances. She entered the Belfast marathon for the first time just four days after hearing about it and then finished in just 3 hours and 51 minutes. In September 2013, she completed the 101-km Titanic Quarter Ultra Marathon, Northern Ireland's longest ever road race. She competes regularly in endurance mountain running, triathlons and duathlons.

== First expedition to Mount Everest ==
Hannah Shields first attempted to scale the south side of Mount Everest in 2003 with the Irish Everest Expedition, but stopped short less than 100m off the summit as a result of extreme weather conditions, depleting oxygen supplies and physical exhaustion. She returned to base camp suffering from frostbite.

== Second expedition to Mount Everest ==
Shields successfully scaled the north face to reach the summit of Mount Everest on 18 May 2007, becoming the first woman from Northern Ireland to achieve this feat. The expedition was led by Alex Abramov and included a team of 17 climbers, four guides and a doctor.

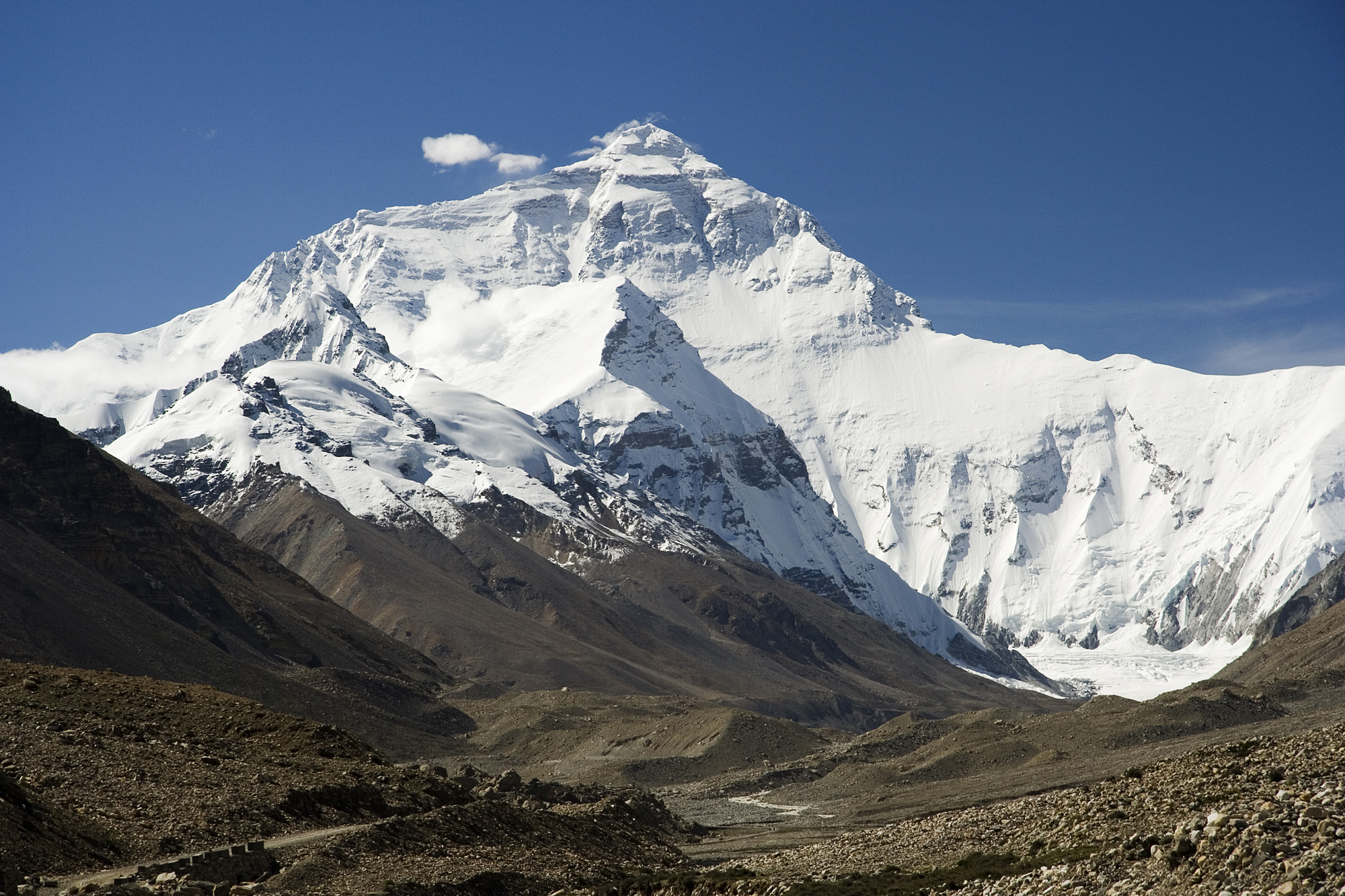
The North Face of Mount Everest that Hannah successfully summited in 2007.

"It was an amazing feeling. Standing there I could see the curvature of the Earth. And I'm thinking, 'There's nobody on this earth above me'." ~ Hannah Shields

== Participation in BBC series ==
In November 2016, she applied to take part in the BBC series "Astronauts, Do You Have What It Takes?", and was successful in being one of the 12 applicants chosen by Chris Hadfield and his team. The series involved testing the candidates for suitability for going into space.

== Personal life ==
In an interview with the Belfast Telegraph, Shields commented on her health, discussing sleep, food, alternative medicine, and quality of life. She mentioned having poor health in her early 30's. At the age of 27, she suffered from multiple organ failure, and had a serious cycling accident in 2018 which resulted in severe head and neck injuries. In 2019, she was unable to continue her orthodontal work as a result of injuries from a cycling accident. She enjoys gardening in her free time.
