= Lyons–Seward Treaty of 1862 =

1862 treaty between Britain and the U.S. to end the Atlantic slave trade

The Treaty between the United States and Great Britain for the Suppression of the Slave Trade, also known as the Lyons-Seward Treaty, was a treaty between the United States and Great Britain in an aggressive measure to end the Atlantic slave trade. It was negotiated by U.S. Secretary of State William H. Seward and British Ambassador to the U.S. Richard Lyons, 1st Viscount Lyons. The treaty was concluded in Washington, on April 7, 1862, and was unanimously ratified by the U.S. Senate on April 25, 1862. Ratifications were exchanged in London, on May 25, 1862.

== History ==
After abolishing the slave trade in its empire in 1807 and winning a decisive victory in the Napoleonic Wars in 1815, Britain created "Mixed Commission Courts" with several other European nations and the United States in the early to mid-nineteenth century. Composed of judges from each of the cooperating nations, these courts were designed to adjudicate allegations of illegal slave trading and condemn slaving ships. Although the United States had abolished its own international slave trade in 1808, it initially declined overtures to participate in mixed courts as part of its treaty arrangements with Britain.

During the American Civil War, however, the Lincoln administration was eager to avoid the prospect of Britain supporting the Confederate States of America in the interests of reopening the transatlantic cotton trade. As part of the agreements that ultimately preserved peace with Britain, the administration entered into (and the United States Senate unanimously ratified) the Lyons–Seward Treaty in 1862. The treaty's primary purpose was to suppress the slave trade in British and American ports and waters.

The treaty set forth aggressive measures to end the Atlantic slave trade, including an agreement that the respective countries would use their navies to seize merchant vessels carrying captured Africans, including any vessel bearing indications of being a slave trading vessel, such as grated hatches instead of closed hatches, stores of food and water far exceeding the needs of a normal crew, and shackles or chains. It conceded to Britain the right of search to a limited extent in African and Cuban waters, but secured a similar concession for American war vessels from the British government.

The treaty had no direct bearing on the issue of slavery in the United States itself, a major issue in the ongoing civil war.

== Mixed slave-trade courts ==
The mixed slave-trade courts were combined courts of the United Kingdom and the United States established under the treaty for the purpose of suppressing the slave trade. The treaty created three mixed courts to be staffed by an equal number of British and American judges for the purposes of adjudicating cases arising under its provisions. The courts were to be held in New York, Sierra Leone, and the Cape of Good Hope (the latter two sites then being under the control of the British Empire). There was to be no appeal from the courts. In cases in which the British and American judge disagreed on a significant issue, the regulations annexed to the treaty set up an unusual tiebreaking system, whereby both nations appointed an 'adjudicator', one of whom was selected by the drawing of lots. The selected adjudicator then consulted with the two judges and voted on the case, with the final sentence or decision reflecting the majority position on each issue.

The illegal transport of slaves from Africa to America dwindled in the years following the treaty's proclamation. The eventual abolition of slavery in the United States made future large-scale illegal importation of slaves highly unlikely. As a result, although the judges remained in office and were paid a salary until the courts were abolished in 1870, they never heard a case.

== See also ==
- Blockade of Africa

== Attribution ==
This article contains content copied from the Federal Judicial Center, a source in the public domain.
