= Garvagh High School =

Secondary school in Northern Ireland

Coordinates: 54.982°N 6.689°W

Garvagh High School was a secondary school located in Garvagh, County Londonderry, Northern Ireland. It was a non-selective, state-maintained school serving students aged 11 to 16. It had 198 pupils and was part of the North Eastern Education and Library Board area.

On 1 October 2012, Education Minister John O'Dowd approved a proposal to close Garvagh High School. This decision was made in response to a decline in enrollment in recent years.

The school ceased operations on 31 August 2013.
