= List of Irish Presbyteries =

The island of Ireland.

Congregations of the Presbyterian Church in Ireland are grouped into 19 presbyteries throughout the island of Ireland. The stated officers within a presbytery are the moderator, who acts as chairman, and the clerk, who acts as secretary to the presbytery. Both the moderator and clerk are chosen from among the ministers and ruling elders under the presbytery's jurisdiction. The Moderator is elected for a term of one year at the March meeting of the presbytery, whilst the clerk is appointed by the Presbytery and holds office at the pleasure of the court.

This page includes a list of all 19 presbyteries of the Presbyterian Church in Ireland and their constituent congregations.

== Ards ==
Ballyblack, Ballycrochan, Ballygilbert, Ballygrainey, Ballyholme, Ballywalter, Bangor - First, Bangor - St. Andrew's, Bangor - Hamilton Road, Bangor - Trinity, Bangor - West, Carrowdore & Ballyfrenis, Cloughey, Conlig, Donaghadee - First, Donaghadee - Shore Street, Glastry, Greyabbey - Trinity, Groomsport, Helen's Bay, Lisnabreen, Millisle & Ballycopeland, Newtownards - First, Newtownards - Greenwell St., Newtownards - Movilla, Newtownards - Regent St., Newtownards - Scrabo, Newtownards - Strean, Portavogie.

== Armagh ==
Ahorey, Armagh - First, Armagh - The Mall, Armaghbrague, Belville, Benburb, Caledon, Clare, Craigavon, Drumhillery, Drumminis, Keady - First, Keady - Second, Knappagh, Lislooney, Loughgall, Lurgan - First, Lurgan - Hill Street, Minterburn, Moy, Portadown - First, Portadown - Armagh Road, Redrock, Richhill, Tartaraghan, Tassagh, Vinecash, Waringstown.

== Ballymena ==
Ahoghill - First, Ahoghill - Trinity, Ahoghill - Brookside, Ballymena - First, Ballymena - High Kirk, Ballymena - West Church, Ballymena - Wellington, Ballymena - Harryville, Ballymena - Ballyloughan, Ballymena - Ballykeel, Ballymena - Ballee, Broughshane - First, Broughshane - Second, Buckna, Cairnalbana, Carnlough/Cushendall, Churchtown, Clough, Cloughwater, Connor, Cuningham Memorial, Dunloy, Eskylane, Glenarm, Glenwherry, Grange, Kells, Killymurris, Newtowncrommelin, Portglenone - First, Rasharkin.

== North Belfast ==
Abbey, Abbot's Cross, Alexandra, Ballygomartin, Ballyhenry, Ballysillan, Carnmoney, Eglinton, Glengormley, Immanuel, New Mossley, Rathcoole, Rosemary, Seaview, Sinclair Seamens, West Kirk, Whiteabbey, Whitehouse

== South Belfast ==
Ballycairn, Belvoir, Cooke Centenary, Central Belfast, Dunmurry & Kilmakee, Finaghy - Lowe Memorial, Fisherwick, Fitzroy, Kinghan, Malone, McCracken Memorial, Newtownbreda - St. John's, Richview, Saintfield Road, South Kirk

== East Belfast ==
Belmont, Bloomfield, Castlereagh, Cregagh, Dundonald, Dundonald - Christ Church, Garnerville, Gilnahirk, Granshaw, Holywood - First, Holywood - High Street, Kirkpatrick Memorial, Knock, McQuiston Memorial, Mersey Street, Mountpottinger, Orangefield, Ravenhill, St. Andrew's, Stormont, Strand, Tullycarnet, Westbourne.

== Carrickfergus ==
Ballycarry, Ballyclare, Ballylinney, Ballynure, Cairncastle, Carrickfergus - First, Carrickfergus - Joymount, Carrickfergus - Woodlands, Carrickfergus - Downshire, Greenisland, Islandmagee, Larne - First, Larne - Gardenmore, Larne - Craigy Hill, Loughmorne, Magheramorne, Raloo, Whitehead, Woodburn.

== Coleraine and Limavady ==
Aghadowey, Ballyrashane, Ballywatt, Ballywillan, Balteagh, Banagher, Boveedy, Bovevagh, Castlerock, Coleraine - First, Coleraine - Terrace Row, Coleraine - New Row, Coleraine - Hazelbank, Coleraine - Ballysally, Crossgar, Derramore, Dunboe - First, Dunboe - Second, Dungiven, Drumachose, Garvagh - First, Garvagh - Main Street, Killaig, Kilrea - First, Kilrea - Second, Largy, Limavady - First, Limavady - Second, Macosquin, Magilligan, Moneydig, Myroe, Portrush, Portstewart, Portstewart - Burnside, Ringsend.

== Derry and Donegal ==
Ballyarnett, Ballykelly, Ballylennon, Burt, Carndonagh, Carnone, Carrigart, Convoy, Crossroads, Cumber, Cumber - Upper, Derry - First, Derry - Carlisle Road, Derry - Ebrington, Derry - Kilfennan, Derry - Waterside, Donagheady, Donegal, Donemana, Donoughmore, Dunfanaghy, Fahan, Fannet, Faughanvale, Glendermott, Gortnessy, Greenbank, Inch, Kilmacrennan, Knowehead, Leckpatrick, Letterkenny - Trinity, Magheramason, Malin, Milford, Monreagh, Moville, Newtowncunningham, Ramelton, Raphoe & Ballindrait, Rathmullan, Ray, Sion, St. Johnston, Strabane, Stranorlar, Trenta.

== Down ==
Ardglass, Ballygowan, Ballynahinch - First, Ballynahinch - Edengrove, Boardmills - Trinity, Carryduff, Clough, Comber - First, Comber - Second, Downpatrick, Killinchy, Killyleagh Kilmore, Crossgar - Lissara, Magherahamlet, Raffrey, Saintfield - First, Saintfield - Second, Seaforde, Spa.

== Dromore ==
Anahilt, Ballinderry, Cargycreevy, Dromara - First, Dromara - Second, Dromore - First, Dromore - Banbridge Road, Drumbo, Drumlough, Harmony Hill, Hillhall, Hillsborough, Legacurry, Lisburn - First, Lisburn - Railway Street, Lisburn - Sloan Street, Lisburn - St. Columba's, Lisburn - Elmwood, Loughaghery, Magheragall, Maze, Moira.

== Dublin/Munster ==
Aghada, Arklow, Athy, Blackrock - St. Andrew's, Bray, Cahir, Carlow, Corboy, Cork - Trinity, Drogheda, Dublin - Abbey, Dublin - Adelaide Road, Dublin - Clontarf & Scots, Dublin - Rathgar (Christ Church), Dun Laoghaire, Donabate, Fermoy, Galway, Greystones, Howth & Malahide, Kilkenny, Lucan, Maynooth, Mullingar, Naas, Tullamore.

== Iveagh ==
Anaghclone, Ballydown, Ballyroney, Banbridge - Bannside, Banbridge - Scarva Street, Brookvale, Castlewellan, Clonduff, Donacloney, Donaghmore, Drumgooland, Drumlee, Garvaghy, Gilford, Glascar, Hilltown, Katesbridge, Kilkinamurry, Leitrim, Loughbrickland, Magherally, Newcastle, Newmills, Rathfriland - First, Rathfriland - Second & Third, Scarva, Tandragee, Tullylish.

== Monaghan ==
Bailieborough - First, Bailieborough - Trinity, Ballina, Ballyalbany, Ballybay - First, Ballybay - Second, Ballyhobridge, Bellasis, Castleblayney - First, Cavan, Clones, Clontibret, Cootehill, Corraneary, Corvalley, Drum, Drumkeen, Drumkeeran, Dundalk, Ervey, Frankford, Glennan, Kells, Killeshandra, Kilmount, Middletown, Monaghan - First, Newbliss, Rockcorry, Sligo, Smithborough, Stonebridge.

== Newry ==
Annalong, Bessbrook, Cladymore, Clarkesbridge & First Newtownnhamilton, Creggan, Cremore, Drumbanangher - First & Jerrettspass, Fourtowns, Garmany's Grove, Kilkeel, Kilkeel - Mourne, Markethill, McKelvey's Grove, Mountnorris, Newry - First (Sandys Street), Newry - Downshire Road, Newtownhamilton - Second, Poyntzpass, Rostrevor, Ryans, Tullyallen, Tyrone's Ditches, Warrenpoint.

== Omagh ==
Ardstraw, Aughentaine, Aughnacloy, Badoney, Ballygawley, Ballymagrane, Ballyreagh, Castlederg - First, Castlederg - Second, Cavanaleck, Clogher, Clogherney, Corrick, Dromore, Drumlegagh, Drumquin, Douglas, Edenderry, Enniskillen, Fintona, Gillygooley, Glenelly, Glenhoy, Gortin, Irvinestown, Killeter, Lisbellaw, Lisnaskea, Maguiresbridge, Mountjoy, Newtownbutler, Newtownstewart, Omagh - First, Omagh - Trinity, Pettigo, Seskinore, Sixmilecross, Tempo, Urney.

== Route ==
Armoy, Ballycastle, Ballymoney - First, Ballymoney - Trinity, Ballymoney - St. James's, Ballyweaney, Bushmills, Bushvale, Dervock, Dromore, Drumreagh, Dunluce, Finvoy, Garryduff, Kilraughts - First, Mosside, Ramoan, Roseyards, Toberdoney, Toberkeigh.

== Templepatrick ==
Antrim - First, Antrim - High Street, Antrim - Greystone Road, Ballyeaston - First, Ballyeaston - Second, Crumlin, Donegore - First, Donegore - Second, Dundrod, Duneane, Hydepark, Kilbride, Killead, Loanends, Lylehill, Muckamore, Randalstown - First, Randalstown - Old Congregation, Randalstown - Second, Templepatrick.

== Tyrone ==
Albany, Ballygoney, Bellaghy, Brigh, Carland, Castlecaulfield, Castledawson, Claggan, Clonaneese Lower, Clonaneese Upper, Coagh, Cookstown - First, Cookstown - Molesworth Street, Culnady, Curran, Draperstown, Dungannon, Eglish, Knockcloghrim, Lecumpher, Maghera, Magherafelt - First, Magherafelt - Union Road, Moneymore - First, Moneymore - Second, Newmills, Orritor, Pomeroy, Saltersland, Sandholes, Stewartstown, Swatragh, Tobermore.
