= Laurence Higgins =

Laurence Higgins (September 3, 1928 – August 24, 2016) was the founder and Pastor Emeritus of the St. Lawrence Catholic parish of Tampa, Florida in the Roman Catholic Diocese of Saint Petersburg. Higgins served as pastor from 1958 to 2007. A celebrated member of the Tampa Bay community, Higgins received the 1994 Outstanding Citizen of the Year award from the Tampa branch of the Civitan Club. Upon his retirement, Tampa Mayor Pam Iorio proclaimed the week of June 21 to June 30, 2007, as "Higgins Days".

== Biography ==
Higgins was born September 3, 1928, in Magherafelt, Northern Ireland. He was ordained a Catholic priest on June 21, 1953, at All Hallows Seminary in Dublin, Ireland. He was transferred to the Florida Diocese of St. Augustine where he worked in Miami, and then in Tampa where he founded St. Lawrence Catholic Church in 1958. As a priest he served as the Vicar General of the Diocese of St. Petersburg under the late Bishop Thomas Larkin. In 1983, Pope John Paul II gave him the title of Monsignor Prelate of Honor and subsequently in 1988 Protonotary Apostolic, the highest rank of Monsignor.

As pastor, Higgins oversaw the development of the St. Lawrence Parish and the St. Lawrence Catholic School. He led fund-raising efforts for local high school communities as well, including a donation from his friend George Steinbrenner for the building of a new football field at Tampa Catholic High School. The parish's convention center, Higgins Hall, was named in his honor.

Higgins was a chaplain for the Tampa Bay Buccaneers and served on planning and executive boards for the Museum of Science and Industry (MOSI) and the Bay Area Legal Services. Higgins was often sought by the Bay area media outlets to comment on controversial and church-related issues.

On April 1, 2007, he announced his retirement as the pastor of the parish effective June 30, 2007, while remaining at the parish as pastor emeritus.

Higgins died in Tampa, Florida on August 24, 2016. The funeral was held at St. Laurence Catholic Church in Tampa on August 31, 2016, with his burial following at the Garden of Memories Cemetery.
