= Knockloughrim =

Village in County Londonderry, Northern Ireland

Coordinates: 54.8117°N 6.6116°W

Knockcloghrim: Irish: Cnoc Clochdhroma
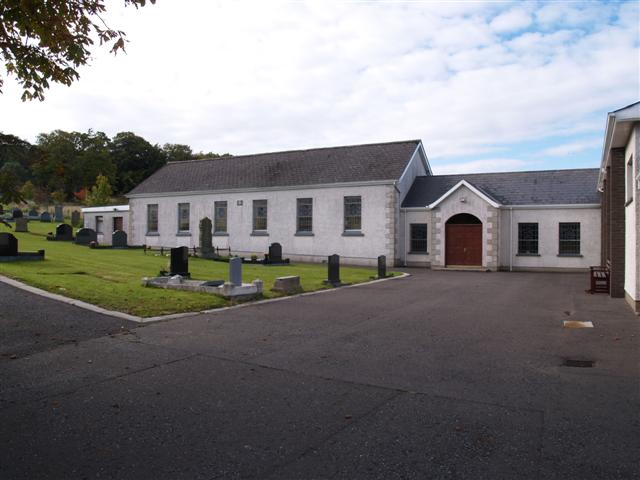
- Knockloughrim Presbyterian church

- Location within Northern Ireland
- Population: 186 (2001 Census)
- Irish grid reference: H8396
  - Belfast: 31 mi (50 km)
- District: Mid Ulster
- County: County Londonderry
- Country: Northern Ireland
- Sovereign state: United Kingdom
- Post town: MAGHERAFELT
- Postcode district: BT45
- Dialling code: 028
- UK Parliament: Mid Ulster
- NI Assembly: Mid Ulster

Knockloughrim or Knockcloghrim (from Irish Cnoc Clochdhroma, meaning 'hill of the stony ridge') is a small village near Maghera in County Londonderry, Northern Ireland. In the 2001 Census it had a population of 186 people. Knockloughrim lies within the civil parish of Termoneeny and is part of the former barony of Loughinsholin. It is situated within the Mid Ulster District Council area.

== Name ==
The village's name is roughly pronounced noc-cloc-rim. The spelling Knockcloghrim, used by the Ordnance Survey of Northern Ireland, has been adopted by the district council, the Electoral Office, and many other official bodies. The spelling Knockloughrim is used by the local Orange lodge/Royal Black Preceptory (Knockloughrim Rising Sons of Ulster LOL 401 and Knockloughrim Red Cross Knights RBP 746 respectively), the local Knockloughrim Primary School, and the regional newspaper, The Mid Ulster Mail. Other historic spellings include Knockcloughrim, Knockloghrim and Knocklockrim.

== History ==
Knockloughrim was founded by John Bates, (1803–1855) a prominent Belfast solicitor who, on travelling through the area on his way to the assizes in Derry, felt it would be a good site for a model village. Bates also served as Town Clerk of Belfast, being a prominent member of the Tory machine which controlled the city after local government reforms of 1842.

Bates is alleged to have embezzled money from the Corporation of Belfast to fund the building of the village, and absconded to France when this was discovered. He would later be extradited, but died in 1855 before he could stand trial. There is a monument to his memory in Termoneeny parish church. His descendant, Sir Richard Dawson Bates, would later serve as Northern Ireland's first Minister of Home Affairs.

Bates is also responsible for the fine 'Knock House', originally intended as a hotel. It served until 1921 as the Anglican rectory, and has since been a private dwelling. The last incumbent to dwell in the rectory was the Reverend Thomas Fisher, who was rector for 34 years until 1921. Knock House was also utilised during the First World War and Second World War to provide shelter for children evacuated from Belfast and other urban areas.

In 1830–1831, Knockloughrim was the scene of a severe riot, when local Orangemen were apparently involved in a scuffle with Roman Catholics.

Until the early 1950s, Knockloughrim was little more than a collection of houses and a church on the old Belfast-Derry route. The Northern Ireland Housing Trust (forerunner of the Northern Ireland Housing Executive) constructed a new estate which was completed in 1952, followed by several more over the following decades. This coupled with private developments has seen Knockloughrim expand.

== Transport ==
Knockloughrim railway station opened on 18 August 1880, closed for passenger traffic on 28 August 1950 and finally closed altogether on 1 October 1959.

The railway station was a stop on the railway line between Magherafelt and Maghera. The old railway bridge at Derganagh Road, under which locomotives passed on their way to and from Maghera, remains in excellent condition, although it is now substantially overgrown and difficult to access. After the Second World War, daffodils were planted on the embankment in a 'V for Victory' formation, and this is still evident today.

The A6 Glenshane Road (Belfast-Derry route) passes less than half a mile from the centre of the village. Until c. 1970, the main route between the two cities actually passed through the village.

== Religion ==
There are two places of worship located within the village, namely St Conlus' Church of Ireland (Termoneeny Parish), built in 1801, is located on the Hillhead Road. The Methodist Church, built in 1984 to replace the old Gospel Hall, which is a joint charge with Cookstown and Magherafelt Methodist Churches. Unfortunately, this church closed in June 2013 although remains maintained by the local Methodists. The Presbyterian Church, originally built in 1765 and replaced with the current building in 1840, is outside the village, being in the townland of Ballinacross. Termoneeny Parish Church is a joint charge with St Comgall's Church of Ireland, Desertmartin Parish, and the Presbyterian Church (a Ministerial charge within the Tyrone Presbytery) has been united with Bellaghy Presbyterian Church since 1928. Local Catholics attend Mass at nearby Mayogall, about 1.5 miles away.

== Parish of Termoneeny ==
The civil parish of Termoneeny (believed to mean the rock of Heaney) has the village as its main population settlement. The parish is geographically one of the smallest in the diocese of Derry and Raphoe, and comprises the following townlands:

- Mullagh
- Knocknakielt
- Carricknakielt
- Derganagh
- Cabragh
- Lurganagoose
- Broagh
- Lemnaroy
- Ballynahone Beg

Termoneeny parish church, which has occupied its current site in the centre of the village since 1801, is an attractive listed building surrounded by mature woodland, and is dedicated to the honour of St Conlus, who is reputed to have been a 5th Century brass worker from the nearby parish of Tamlaght O'Crilly. However, despite extensive research, no firm record of him has been produced. It has been suggested, although it is obviously far from certain, that St Conlus may be a variation on the name of the much more famous St Columba. The oldest gravestone in the churchyard dates from 1859. At least three former rectors of the parish are buried in the churchyard:

- Rev Henry Colthurst (rector 1862–1875)
- Rev Thomas Reddy (rector 1875–1884)
- Rev Thomas Fisher (rector 1887–1921)

The parish existed as a 'stand-alone' entity (having been united with Ballyscullion parish for over a century beforehand) between 1795 and 1921, with a rector residing in the attendant Rectory for much of this period. After the death of Rev. Thomas Fisher in 1921, the parish was ultimately amalgamated with the neighbouring parishes of Maghera and Killelagh; this union was terminated in 1980, when the current union with Desertmartin parish commenced.

== Economy ==
Knockloughrim is the location of FP McCann Ltd, one of Northern Ireland's biggest quarrying contractors, and are responsible for many major projects, including the construction of the Toome by-pass, which opened in 2004. Their facilities now encompass a large portion of both sides of the Quarry Road, just outside the village, including the old McLean's Quarry.
