= Kilrea =

Village in County Londonderry, Northern Ireland

Coordinates: 54.966667°N 6.583333°W

Kilrea: Irish: Cill Ria
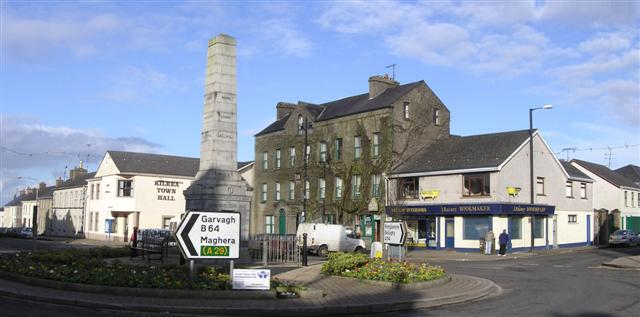

- Location within Northern Ireland
- Population: 1,678 (2011 Census)
- District: Causeway Coast and Glens
- County: County Londonderry
- Country: Northern Ireland
- Sovereign state: United Kingdom
- Post town: COLERAINE
- Postcode district: BT51
- Dialling code: 028
- UK Parliament: East Londonderry
- NI Assembly: East Londonderry

Kilrea (/kɪlˈreɪ/ kil-RAY, from Irish Cill Ria, meaning 'church on the hill') is a village, townland and civil parish in County Londonderry, Northern Ireland. It gets its name from the ancient church that stood near the current Church of Ireland on Church Street, overlooking the town. It is near the River Bann, which marks the boundary between County Londonderry and County Antrim. In the 2011 Census, it had a population of 1,678. It is situated within Causeway Coast and Glens district.

== History ==
There is a tradition that St Patrick visited the area during the fifth century, a story repeated recently in the book 'The Fairy Thorn' produced by Kilrea local historians. During the Plantation of Ulster, Kilrea and the surrounding townlands were granted to the Worshipful Company of Mercers by King James I for settlement. Their headquarters in Ulster were at nearby Movanagher on the banks of the River Bann. Today, Kilrea is a market town and commercial centre of the surrounding district. The village is centred on 'The Diamond' which includes the town's War Memorial erected in honour of Kilrea men killed in the Great War. The village is featured in the Orange song, Sprigs of Kilrea. It is also mentioned in the song 'Kitty the Rose of Kilrea' by The Irish Rover band

=== The Troubles ===
A total of seven people died in violence relating to the Troubles. Five were killed by the Provisional Irish Republican Army (IRA) and two by the Ulster Freedom Fighters (UFF). All the IRA's victims were current or former members of the security forces, with two belonging to the Royal Ulster Constabulary, one a current and one a former member of the Ulster Defence Regiment, and one belonging to the British Territorial Army. All were Protestants and three of the five were off duty when they were killed. According to the Sutton Index of Deaths, both men killed by the UFF were former members of the IRA. At the time of their deaths, both were associated with Sinn Féin. Both were Catholic. Of the seven killed in the Kilrea Troubles, all were killed in separate incidents, and all were shot except one of the RUC officers, who was killed by a booby trap bomb while on patrol. While deaths in many other areas were concentrated in the early 1970s, in Kilrea they were spread between 1976 and 1992.

=== Festival of the Fairy Thorn ===
A feature of Kilrea is its 'Fairy Thorn' tree, which stands just outside the front wall of First Kilrea Presbyterian Church. The festival began in 1992 and ran for 11 years until 2003, but was again revived successfully in 2022 as a summer cross-community festival in the town. The festival features, among other events, Comedy and Music nights, Funfairs and fun days for children, Vintage Rallies, Treasure Hunts and showcases for the townsfolk by the townsfolk.

== Notable people ==
- John Dallat, first nationalist mayor of the Borough of Coleraine
- Josh McErlean, World Rally Championship driver
- Monica McWilliams, academic and former politician
- Ceadach O'Neill, professional footballer, Northern Ireland international
- Martin O'Neill, ex professional footballer; manager of Celtic FC
- Hannah Shields, athlete and first Northern Irish woman to reach the summit of Mount Everest

== Railways ==
Kilrea railway station was opened by the Derry Central Railway on 18 February 1880. It was taken over by the Northern Counties Committee in September 1901.

The station was closed to passengers on 28 August 1950 by the Ulster Transport Authority.

== Sport ==
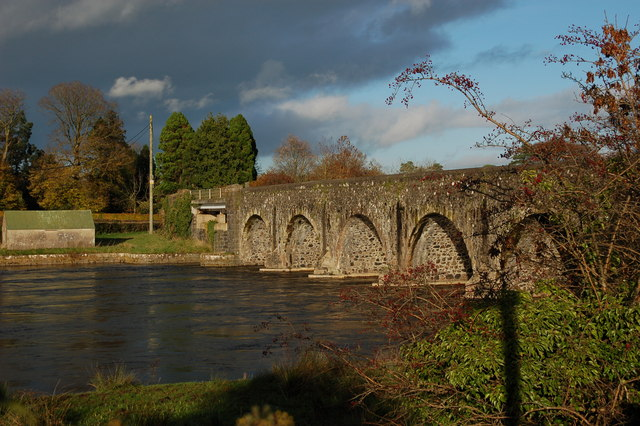
Kilrea Bridge over the Bann

- Kilrea Pádraig Pearses GAC
- Kilrea United Football Club

== Education ==
- Kilrea Primary School
- St Columba's Primary School
- St Conor's College
- Crossroads Primary School

== Religion ==
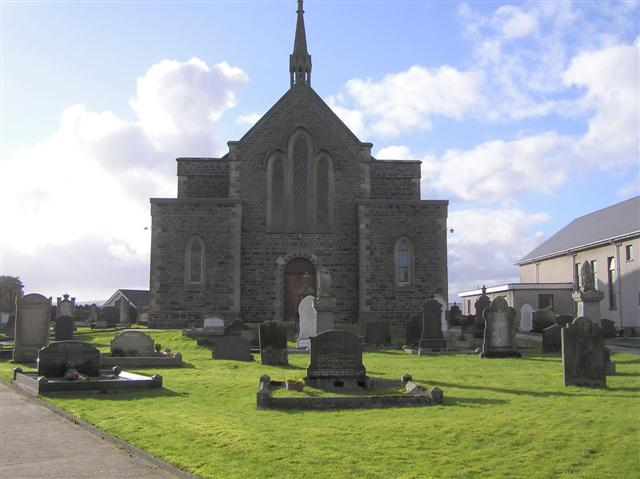
First Kilrea Presbyterian Church

- Kilrea Baptist Church
- Kilrea Presbyterian Church
- St Anne's Oratory
- St Mary's Roman Catholic Church (Drumnagarner)
- St Patrick's Church of Ireland

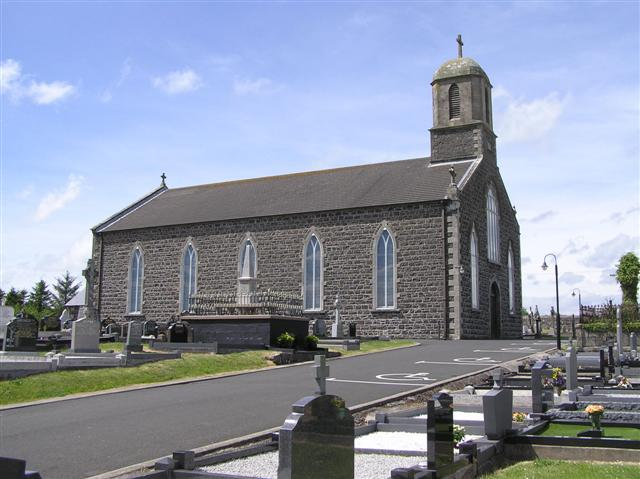
Drumnagarner Catholic church.

== 2011 Census ==
Kilrea is classified as a village by the Northern Ireland Statistics and Research Agency (NISRA) (i.e., with a population between 1,000 and 2,499 people). On Census day (22 March 2011), there were 1,678 people living in Kilrea. Of these:

- 21.81% were aged under 16 years, and 14.12% were aged 65 and over
- 49.05% of the population were male, and 50.95% were female
- 73.42% were from a Catholic background and 23.48% were from a Protestant background
- 7.59% of people aged 16–74 were unemployed

== See also ==
- List of civil parishes of County Londonderry
