= Robert Hagan (Royal Navy officer) =

Rear-Admiral Sir Robert Hagan (3 November 1794 – 25 April 1863) was an Irish officer in the British Royal Navy.

Hagan was born in Magherafelt, the fifth son of John Hagan. He entered the Navy, 22 December 1807, serving on HMS Surveillante under Captain George Collier. He remained on this ship until December 1813 when he joined the crew of HMS Porcupine (1807).

He commanded HMS Princess Charlotte, then HMS Prince Regent, as a lieutenant during the British anti-slave campaigns around Sierra Leone.

In 1839, he was a corresponding member of the Society for the Extinction of the Slave Trade and for the Civilization of Africa.

He subsequently settled in Cobh (Queenstown), Ireland, where he was appointed Inspecting Commander of the Cork District Coast guard in 1843. In this capacity he submitted evidence to the Transatlantic Packet Station Commission in 1851.

He died suddenly in 1863 at 17 Pembroke Road, Dublin.
