= Aghadowey =

Townland in east County Londonderry, Northern Ireland

Coordinates: 55°01′44″N 6°39′07″W

Aghadowey: Irish: Achadh Dubhthaigh
- Townland
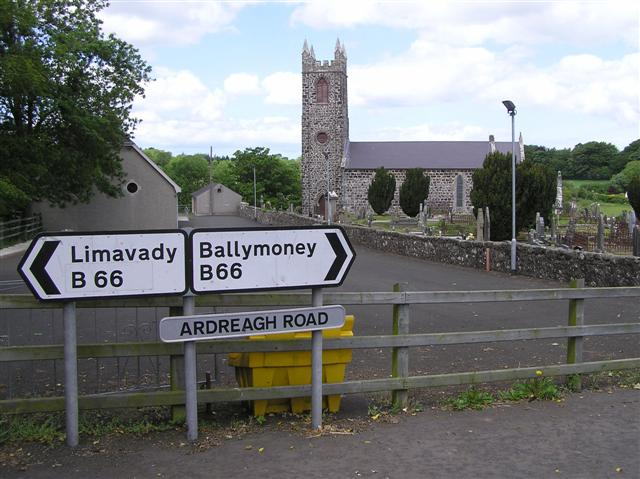
- Aghadowey in 2008

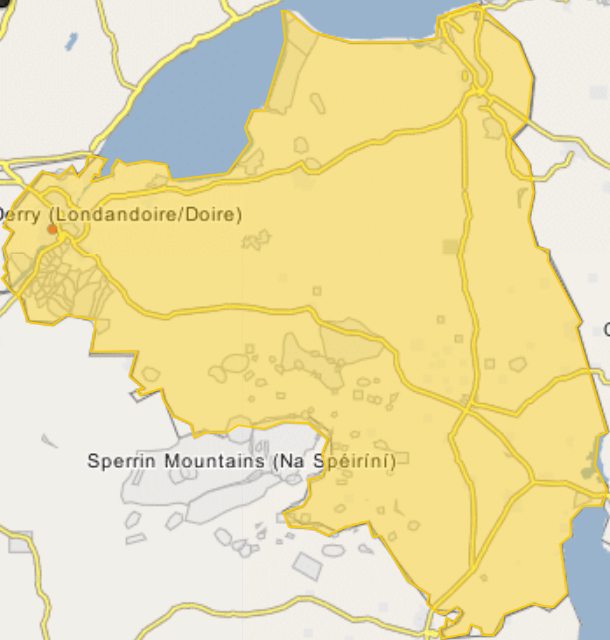
- Location within Northern Ireland
- Area: 0.6907 sq mi (1.789 km^{2})
- Civil parish: Aghadowey
- District: Causeway Coast and Glens
- County: County Londonderry
- Country: Northern Ireland
- Sovereign state: United Kingdom
- Post town: COLERAINE
- Postcode district: BT51
- Police: Northern Ireland
- Fire: Northern Ireland
- Ambulance: Northern Ireland
- UK Parliament: East Londonderry
- NI Assembly: East Londonderry

Aghadowey (from Irish Achadh Dubhthaigh 'Duffy’s field') is a townland in east County Londonderry, Northern Ireland. It lies in Aghadowey civil parish, and is part of Causeway Coast and Glens district. 7 miles (11 km) south of Coleraine, it is close to the county boundary with County Antrim.

== Sport ==
Aghadowey is a popular angling area, with anglers fishing both the River Bann and the Agivey River. Aghadowey Stadium hosts regular motorcycle racing, stock car racing, and also rallying as a RallySport Association event, on the disused RAF Mullaghmore airfield. Aghadowey was the home circuit (1.003 miles/1.614 km) of the Motor Cycle Road Racing Club of Ireland (MCRRCI) (now Bishopscourt Race Circuit near Downpatrick) and was first used for racing in 1975, after the club was forced to vacate their previous circuit at Maghaberry to make way for a new prison development.

Aghadowey F.C. was founded in 1968 when the Coleraine and district league formed, before this they played as Agivey. They have notable rivalries with both Garvagh F.C. and Kilrea F.C.

== Transport ==
- Aghadowey railway station opened on 19 February 1880, but closed on 28 August 1950.

== See also ==
- List of villages in Northern Ireland
- List of towns in Northern Ireland
