= Macfin railway station =

Railway station in County Antrim, Northern Ireland

Macfin
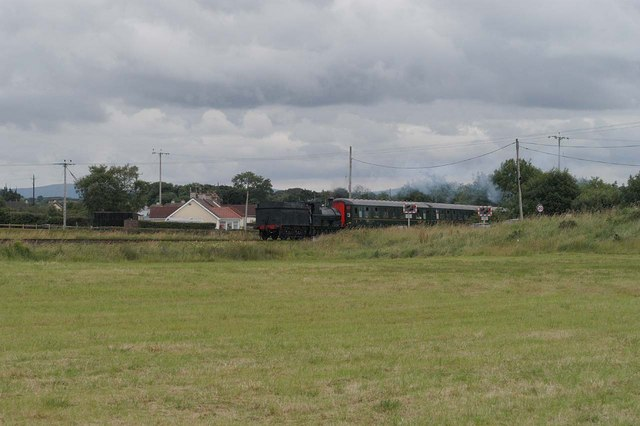
- Macfin Level Crossing with a Railway Preservation Society of Ireland steam hauled rail tour.

General information
- Location: Loughan Road; Macfin, County Antrim; Northern Ireland
- Coordinates: 55.0815°N 6.5978°W

Other information
- Status: Disused

History
- Original company: Ballymena, Ballymoney, Coleraine and Portrush Junction Railway
- Pre-grouping: Belfast and Northern Counties Railway
- Post-grouping: Ulster Transport Authority

Key dates
- 1 July 1856: Station opens
- 1867: Station closes to passengers
- 19 February 1880: Station relocated and reopened to passengers
- 20 August 1950: Services to Magherafelt cease
- 20 September 1954: Station closes
Location

Macfin railway station served the village of Macfin and the surrounding area in County Antrim.

== History ==
The station opened on 1 July 1856, operated by the Ballymena, Ballymoney, Coleraine and Portrush Junction Railway. It was taken over by the Northern Counties Committee in January 1861 and closed to passengers in 1867.

Reopened on 19 February 1880 to coincide with the Derry Central Railway's extension to Magherafelt, the station was relocated and became Macfin Junction, situated to the southeast. Passenger service on the Derry Central Railway ceased on 20 August 1950, and the line between Macfin and Kilrea closed entirely.

Macfin station finally closed on 20 September 1954.

== Routes ==
Preceding station	Historical railways	Following station
Ballymoney; Line and station open	Ballymena, Ballymoney, Coleraine and Portrush Junction Railway; Ballymena-Portrush	Coleraine; Line and station open
Aghadowey; Line and station closed	Derry Central Railway; Magherafelt-Macfin Junction	Terminus
Curragh Bridge Halt; Line and station closed	Northern Counties Committee; Derry Central line	Terminus
