= Ulster Transport Authority =

Parastatal railway and bus operator in Northern Ireland

- Industry: Bus and Railway operator
- Predecessor: Northern Ireland Road Transport Board; Belfast and County Down Railway; Northern Counties Committee (LMS; 1949); Great Northern Railway (1958)
- Founded: 1948
- Defunct: 1967
- Fate: Demerged
- Successor: Northern Ireland Transport Holding Company; Northern Ireland Railways; Ulsterbus
- Headquarters: Belfast, Northern Ireland
- Area served: Northern Ireland

The Ulster Transport Authority (UTA) ran rail and bus transport in Northern Ireland that operated from 1948 until 1967.

== Formation and consolidation ==
Transport Act (Northern Ireland) 1948
- Act of Parliament
- Parliament of Northern Ireland
- Citation: 1948 c. 16 (N.I.)

Dates
- Royal assent: 10 August 1948
- Commencement: 1 October 1948

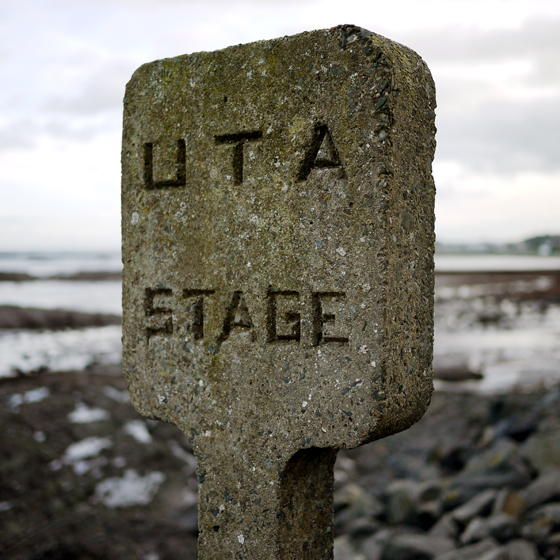
Disused concrete bus stop in County Down

The UTA was formed by the Transport Act (Northern Ireland) 1948 (c. 16 (N.I.)), which merged the Northern Ireland Road Transport Board (NIRTB) and the Belfast and County Down Railway (BCDR). Added to this by the Ireland Act 1949 (12, 13 & 14 Geo. 6. c. 41) was the Northern Counties Committee (NCC), owned by the British Transport Commission's Railway Executive since its previous owner, the London, Midland and Scottish Railway (LMS), had been nationalised in 1948 by the Transport Act 1947 (10 & 11 Geo. 6. c. 49).

== Branch railway closures ==
In January 1950 the UTA closed almost the entire BCDR network except the Bangor branch line. In the same year it closed the Macfin – Kilrea section of the former NCC's Derry Central Railway and the freight-only branches to Draperstown and from Limavady to Dungiven. It also withdrew passenger services from the former NCC branch lines to Cookstown, Limavady and the Magherafelt – Kilrea section of the Derry Central. That summer it also closed Northern Ireland's last 3 ft (914 mm) narrow gauge lines: the Ballycastle Railway and the Ballymena and Larne Railway.

In 1954 seven 6-coach diesel units were put on the Belfast-Bangor line, making it the first completely dieselised passenger service in Ireland.

In 1955 the UTA closed the (by then freight-only) branches to Cookstown and Limavady, and the line between Castlewellan and Newcastle, County Down (which was still worked by the GNR).

In 1957 the Northern Ireland Government made the Great Northern Railway Board close much of its network in the province. This left no railways in many rural areas, including the whole of County Fermanagh. By 1958 the GNR main line was the only remaining railway across the border between the Republic of Ireland and Northern Ireland. In that year what was left of the GNRB was dissolved and split between Córas Iompair Éireann (the Republic of Ireland's nationalised transport company) and the UTA.

In 1959 the UTA closed the (by then freight only) remaining Magherafelt – Kilrea section of the Derry Central and the former GNR (by then freight only) branch from Dungannon to Cookstown north of Coalisland. The UTA also took over the Londonderry Port and Harbour Commissioners' dual gauge railway that linked Derry's four railway termini, and in 1962 the UTA closed this railway as well.

== The Benson Report ==
In 1962, on the recommendation of Dr Richard Beeching, the Government of Northern Ireland commissioned a senior Coopers & Lybrand accountant, Sir Henry Benson, to report on the future of the UTA's railways. In 1963 Benson submitted his report, which recommended closing all UTA railways except the Belfast commuter lines to Bangor and Larne and the main line between Belfast and Dublin, and the reduction of the main line between Portadown and Dundalk to single track.

Benson recommended the only reason for retaining the main line between Portadown and Dundalk was not for transport or economics but solely political. The Republic of Ireland's government objected to Benson's proposal to single the track between Portadown and Dundalk so the Northern Ireland Government withdrew it.

Derry had two rail links with Belfast: the former NCC main line via Coleraine and the former GNR one via Portadown. Benson's recommendation to close both lines provoked strong protest from Northern Ireland's second city and towns along both routes. The Northern Ireland Government responded by retaining the former NCC main line, which was slightly the shorter of the two but also served strongly Unionist parts of County Antrim, plus the short branch between Coleraine and the seaside resort of Portrush.

In 1965 the Northern Ireland government implemented Benson's recommendation to close the former GNR route between Portadown and Derry, informally known as the "Derry Road", at the cost of 400 jobs. This ended all railway services to stations including Dungannon, Omagh, Strabane, and left the entire southwest of the province, including the whole of County Tyrone, with no rail services. The government also closed the Belfast Central Railway, (that Benson had recommended retaining). The branch between Goraghwood and Newry Edward Street was also closed, leaving Newry with no stations for 19 years until the reopening of the inconveniently sited Bessbrook station on the main line in 1984, which was some distance up a hill outside the town.

These closures left only the Belfast York Road – Londonderry Waterside, Bleach Green – Larne Harbour and Coleraine – Portrush lines in service.

== Split into rail and road companies ==
Transport Acts in 1967 split the UTA into road and rail operations, the bus operations being taken over by a new company called Ulsterbus in the same year. The rail operations temporarily became Ulster Transport Railways (UTR) before being taken over by Northern Ireland Railways (NIR) in 1968.

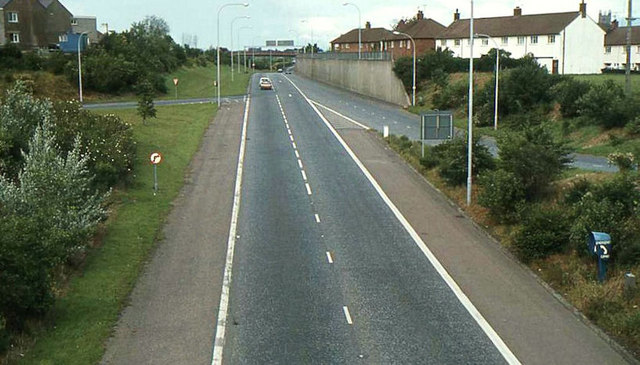
Portadown with former GNR (potential) line to Armagh.

== Sources and further reading ==
- Baker, Michael H.C. (1972). Irish Railways since 1916. London: Ian Allan. ISBN 0-7110-0282-7.
- FitzGerald, J.D. (1995). The Derry Road. Colourpoint Transport. Gortrush: Colourpoint Press. ISBN 1-898392-09-9.
- Flanagan, Colm (2003). Diesel Dawn. Newtownards: Colourpoint Books. ISBN 1-904242-08-1.
- Hajducki, S. Maxwell (1974). A Railway Atlas of Ireland. Newton Abbot: David & Charles. ISBN 0-7153-5167-2.
- Simpson, Sam (2008). Great Northern Railway of Ireland Road Motor Service 1925-1958. Glossop: Venture Publications. ISBN 978-190530-4097.
