= Magherafelt =

Town in County Londonderry, Northern Ireland

Coordinates: 54.75°N 6.61°W

Magherafelt: Irish: Machaire Fíolta; Scots: Macherafelt
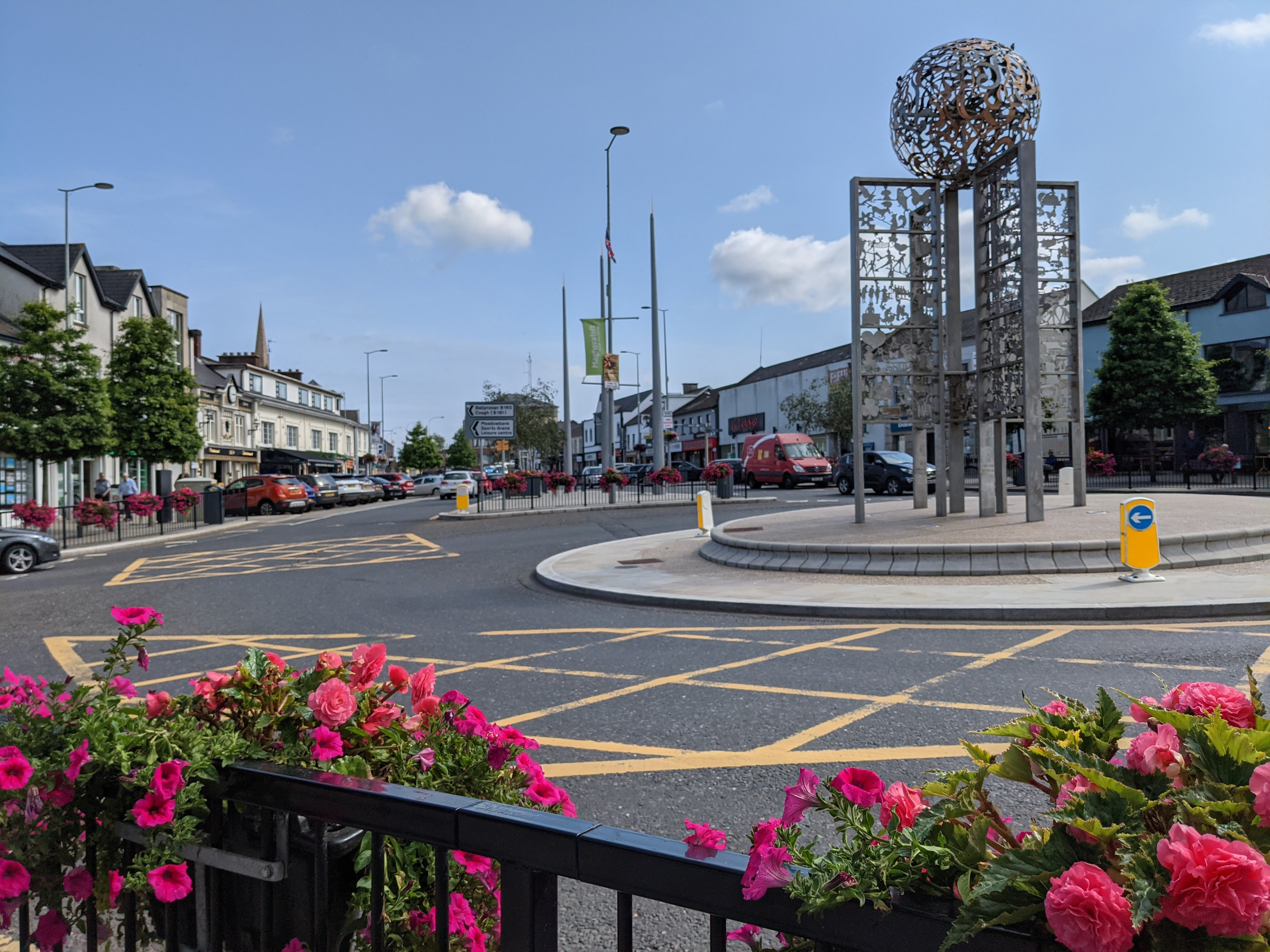
- Magherafelt town centre.

- Location within Northern Ireland
- Population: 9,071 (2021 census)
  - Belfast: 35 mi (56 km)
- District: Mid-Ulster
- County: County Londonderry
- Country: Northern Ireland
- Sovereign state: United Kingdom
- Post town: MAGHERAFELT
- Postcode district: BT45
- Dialling code: 028
- Police: Northern Ireland
- Fire: Northern Ireland
- Ambulance: Northern Ireland
- UK Parliament: Mid Ulster
- NI Assembly: Mid Ulster

Magherafelt (/ˌmæhərəˈfɛlt, ˌmækə-/ MA-hə-rə-FELT, MAK-ə-; from Irish Machaire Fíolta, meaning 'plain of Fíolta', pronounced [ˈmˠaxəɾʲə ˈfʲiːl̪ˠt̪ˠə]) is a town and civil parish in County Londonderry, Northern Ireland. It had a population of 9,071 at the 2021 census. It is the biggest town in the south of the county and is the social, economic and political hub of the area. It is part of Mid-Ulster District.

== History ==
Magherafelt has been documented as a town since 1425. An earlier name for the area was Teach Fíolta – 'Fíolta's (monastic) house'. This would suggest that there was a monastic settlement here under the leadership of Fíolta. The site of the medieval parish church may be marked by the ruins of a later church and graveyard at the bottom of Broad Street.

The Salters Company of London was granted the surrounding lands in South Londonderry in the seventeenth century as part of the Plantation of Ulster. Subsequently, the town began to take on its current shape with a central diamond forming the heart of the town.

During The Troubles in the late 20th century, 11 people were killed in or near Magherafelt in connection with the conflict.

== Governance ==
The town had its own Magherafelt District Council. On 1 April 2015, it was merged with Cookstown District Council and Dungannon and South Tyrone Borough Council under local government reorganisation in Northern Ireland becoming Mid-Ulster District Council. The Mid Ulster District Council has 40 councillors of which five are elected by the electors of Magherafelt. In the 2019 Mid Ulster District Council election, the five elected councillors included two members of Sinn Féin, one member of the SDLP and two members of the Democratic Unionist Party.

It is located within the Mid Ulster (Assembly constituency) in the Northern Ireland Assembly and the Mid Ulster (UK Parliament constituency). The current MP is Francie Molloy of Sinn Féin.

== Notable buildings ==
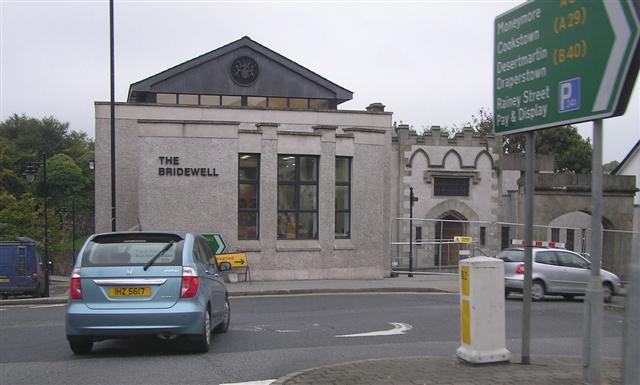
The Bridewell, Magherafelt – geograph.org.uk - 573457

At the foot of Broad Street is located The Bridewell. This building previously housed the town's court-house and gaol (jail). The name Bridewell is a common name in Britain and Ireland for a prison (see Bridewell Palace). It has since been refurbished and now houses the town's library and tourist centre.

=== Churches ===
- Catholic Church of Our Lady of the Assumption (1882)
- St. Swithin's Church of Ireland (1858)
- First Presbyterian Church (1738)
- Calvary Free Presbyterian Church (1978)
- Magherafelt Baptist Church (2007)

== Transport ==
=== Road ===
Magherafelt lies on the A31 route which connects the south west of the province (Tyrone, Fermanagh) to the north east (Coleraine, Ballymena etc.). Traffic from north and south used to pass through the town centre frequently leading to considerable congestion. In the 1970s a bypass was proposed route which was eventually funded in 2013 and completed in 2016. The road is a single-carriageway around the eastern edge of the town connecting Moneymore Road and Castledawson Road. The old road through the town became the B40 when the road opened.

Ulsterbus runs a number of bus routes to and through Magherafelt. Magherafelt Buscentre operates the routes 89b (Ardboe), 89/d (Cookstown), 89e (Ballyronan) 110/b/f (Antrim bus and railway station or Cookstown), 112/a (Draperstown), 116b/c (Maghera), 127 (Portglenone and Ballymena bus and railway station), 389a/c/d (run around the town), 389b (Castledawson) and 403 (Cranagh).

=== Rail ===
Magherafelt was once served by the Northern Counties Committee as a junction station for the Cookstown, Draperstown and Derry Central lines. Magherafelt railway station opened on 10 November 1856, shut for passenger traffic on 28 August 1950 and shut altogether on 1 October 1959.

== Schools ==
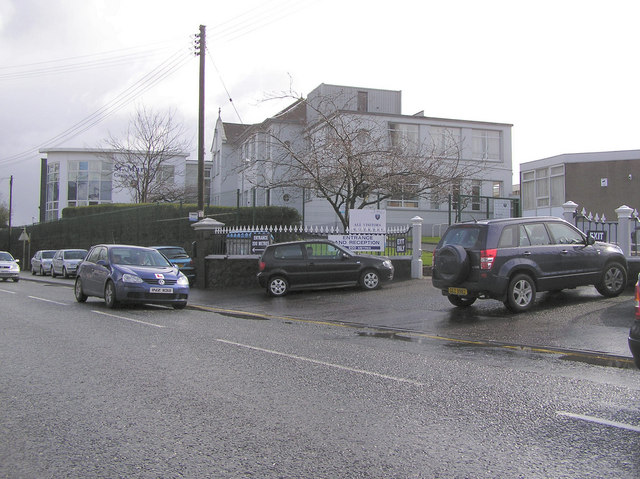
St Mary's Grammar School, Magherafelt

There are seven primary schools serving the area. Local secondary schools include St. Mary's Grammar School, Saint Pius X College, Rainey Endowed School, Sperrin Integrated College and Magherafelt High School.

== Sport ==
Magherafelt has several sporting teams, including Magherafelt Reds, O'Donovan Rossa Magherafelt GAC, the Rainey Old Boys Rugby Club and Magherafelt Sky Blues F.C. There is also the Mid Ulster Athletic Club, the Mid Ulster Swimming Club and the Magherafelt District Motorclub.

== Demography ==
National Identity of Magherafelt residents (2021)
| Nationality | Per cent |
| Irish | 36.4% |
| British | 30.9% |
| Northern Irish | 30.4% |

=== 2021 Census ===
The town of Magherafelt encompasses the Super Data Zones of Magherafelt_A, Magherafelt_B and Magherafelt_C according to the Northern Ireland Statistics and Research Agency. At the time of the 2021 census, there were 9,071 people living in Magherafelt. Of these:

- 59.9% were from a Catholic background and 31.5% were from a Protestant or other Christian background.
- 30.9% indicated that they had a British national identity, 36.4% had an Irish national identity, and 30.4% had a Northern Irish national identity.

=== 2011 Census ===
At the time of the 2011 census, there were 8,805 people living in Magherafelt. This represented an increase of 5.2% on the Census 2001 population of 8,372. Of these:

- 21.75% were aged under 16 years and 12.44% were aged 65 and over.
- 48.65% of the population were male and 51.35% were female.
- 59.73% were from a Catholic background and 35.67% were from a Protestant or other Christian background.
- 5.65% of people aged 16–74 were unemployed.
- 36.98% indicated that they had a British national identity, 33.87% had an Irish national identity, and 30.45% had a Northern Irish national identity.

== Notable people ==
- Jonathan Anderson (born 1984) – fashion designer
- Joseph Burns (1906–) – Ulster Unionist member of the Parliament of Northern Ireland from 1960 to 1973
- Paul Charles (born 1949) – novelist, music promoter and talent agent
- Peter Doherty (1913–1990) – former footballer and manager of Northern Ireland
- Barry Gillis (born 1980) – current Derry Gaelic footballer
- Harry Gregg (1932–2020) – former Manchester United and Northern Ireland goalkeeper
- Robert Hagan (1794–1863) – naval officer and abolitionist
- Monsignor Laurence Higgins (1928–2016) – former Vicar General of the Diocese of St. Petersburg, Florida and founder of St. Lawrence Catholic Parish in Tampa, Florida
- Aaron Hughes (born 1979) – former professional Association Footballer
- William John Johnston (1868–1940) – barrister and Supreme Court of Ireland judge
- Philip Maini, FRS FMedSci FRSB (born 1959) – mathematician
- Willie McCrea (born 1948) – politician and a member of the Democratic Unionist Party
- Terry McFlynn (born 1981) – a retired football player
- Fionn McLaughlin (born 2007) – racing driver
- Mickey Niblock – former Derry Gaelic footballer
- Laura Pyper (born 1980) – actress (Hex, Reign of Fire and Headrush)
- Dean Shiels (born 1985) – professional association football player
- Kenny Shiels (born 1956) – former manager of Derry City F.C.
- Sir James Starritt, KCVO (1914–2000) – Deputy Commissioner of Police of the Metropolis (London Metropolitan Police) from 1972 to 1975
- JC Stewart (born 1997) – singer songwriter

== See also ==
- List of civil parishes of County Londonderry
- List of localities in Northern Ireland by population
