= Derry Central Railway =

Former Irish railway company

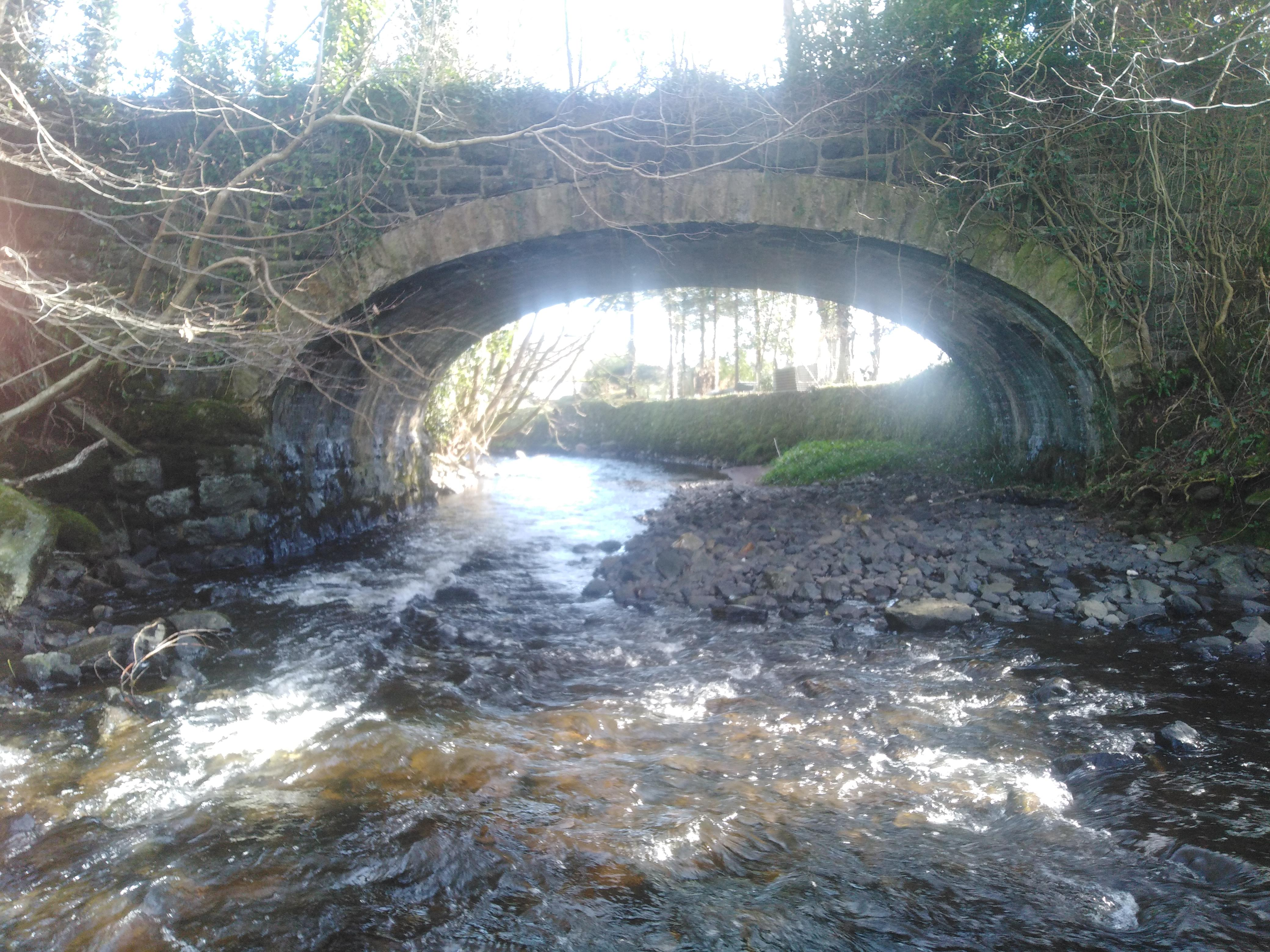
Railway Bridge Spanning The Knockoneil River In Upperlands

The Derry Central Railway was an Irish gauge (1,600 mm (5 ft 3 in)) railway in County Londonderry, Northern Ireland.

== History ==
Derry Central Railway Act 1875
- Act of Parliament
- Parliament of the United Kingdom
- Long title: An Act for making certain Railways between the Town of Magherafelt in the county of Londonderry, and the Town of Coleraine in the same county; and for other purposes.
- Citation: 38 & 39 Vict. c. ccx

Dates
- Royal assent: 11 August 1875

Text of statute as originally enacted

Derry Central Railway Act 1877
- Act of Parliament
- Parliament of the United Kingdom
- Long title: An Act for conferring further powers upon the Derry Central Railway Company, and for authorising the Belfast and Northern Counties Railway Company to raise additional capital and to subscribe towards the undertaking of the Derry Central Railway Company; and for other purposes.
- Citation: 40 & 41 Vict. c. cxii

Dates
- Royal assent: 23 July 1877

Text of statute as originally enacted

The line was authorised by the Derry Central Railway Act 1875 (38 & 39 Vict. c. ccx), and constructed from Macfin Junction (between Coleraine and Ballymoney) to Magherafelt, serving Knockloughrim, Maghera, Upperlands, Kilrea, Garvagh and Aghadowey. Although nominally independent, the line was funded and operated by the Belfast and Northern Counties Railway (BNCR).

Belfast and Northern Counties Railway Act 1901
- Act of Parliament
- Parliament of the United Kingdom
- Long title: An Act to provide for the purchase by the Belfast and Northern Counties Railway Company of the Derry Central Railway from the Commissioners of Public Works in Ireland.
- Citation: 1 Edw. 7. c. cclix

Dates
- Royal assent: 17 August 1901

Text of statute as originally enacted

It opened on 18 December 1880 and was 29.25 miles (47.07 km) long. Despite the celebration of its opening, it was never a financial success, and in September 1901 it was taken over by the BNCR for the sum of £85,000 under the Belfast and Northern Counties Railway Act 1901 (1 Edw. 7. c. cclix).

In 1936 there were two trains a day from Belfast to Coleraine via this line and one other train from Magherafelt to Coleraine, consisting of two coaches and a 2-4-0 compound engine. The track had flat bottomed rails, followed the contour of the land and the only large structure was a lattice girder bridge over the River Bann near Macfin.

The line was marginalised by the Ulster Transport Authority on 28 August 1950, which saw the withdrawal of passenger services and complete closure of the line between Macfin and Kilrea. The remaining section between Kilrea and Macfin remained open for goods traffic until 1 October 1959 and the tracks were lifted soon after.

== The line today ==
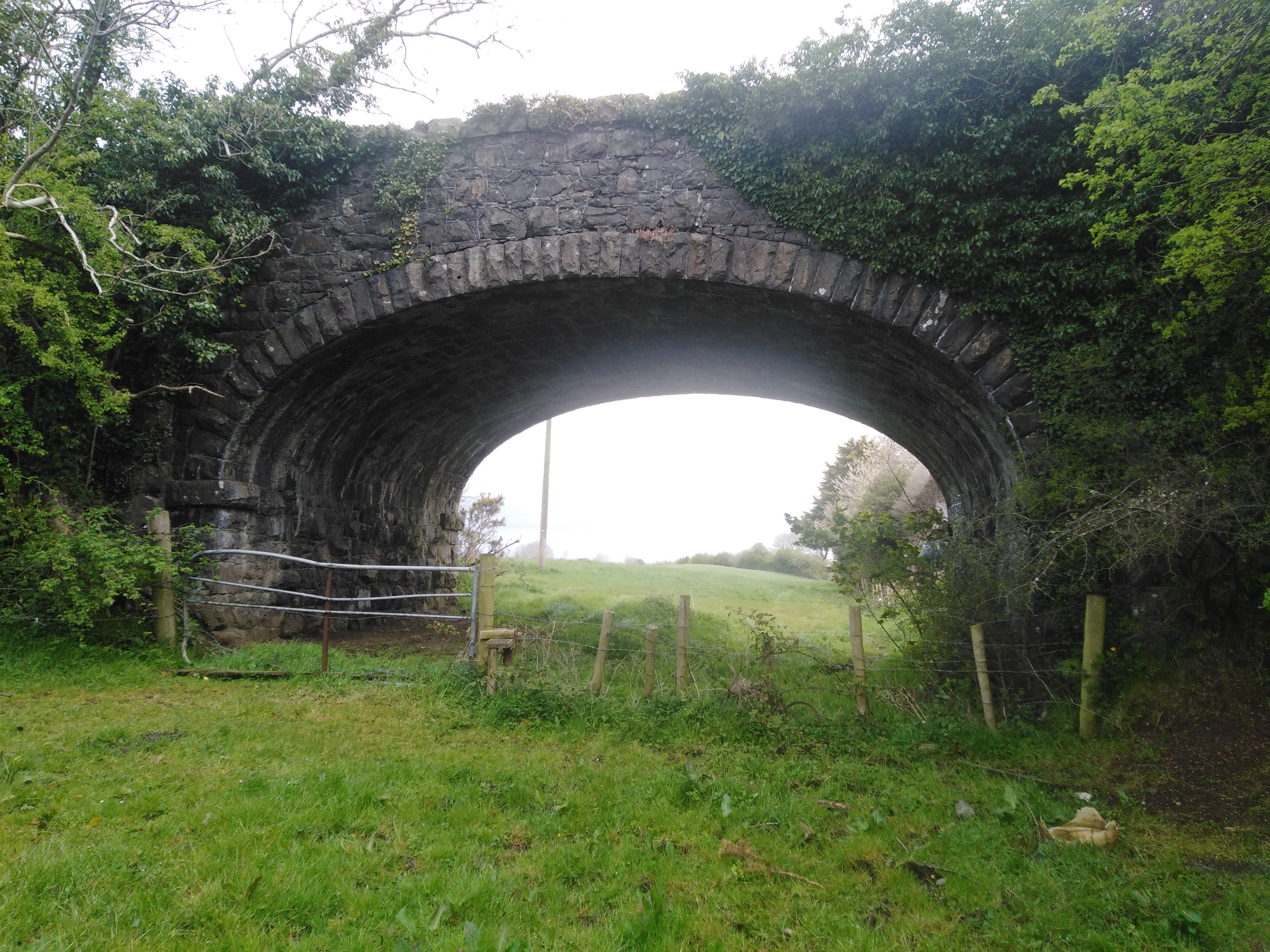
Rosgarran Bridge Once Spanned The Railway

While the line is now long gone, there are still stations at every town and 8 bridges that once spanned the line are still intact.
