= Northern Ireland =

Part of the United Kingdom

Northern Ireland: Tuaisceart Éireann (Irish); Norlin Airlann (Ulster Scots)
- Anthem: Various
- Location of Northern Ireland (dark green) – in Europe (green & dark grey) – in the United Kingdom (green)
- Capital and largest city: Belfast; 54.596°N 5.93°W
- Official languages: English; Irish
- Regional and minority languages: Ulster Scots
- Ethnic groups (2021): 96.8% White; 1.6% Asian; 0.8% Mixed; 0.6% Black; 0.3% other ethnic groups
- Religion (2021): 79.7% Christianity; 42.3% Catholicism; 30.5% Protestantism; 6.9% other Christians; 17.4% no religion; 1.6% religion not stated; 1.3% other religions
- Sovereign state; Legal jurisdiction: United Kingdom; Northern Ireland
- Government: Devolved consociational parliamentary government
  - Monarch: Charles III
  - First Minister: Michelle O'Neill
  - Deputy First Minister: Emma Little-Pengelly

Parliament of the United Kingdom
  - Secretary of State: Chris Bryant
  - House of Commons: 18 MPs (of 650)
- Legislature: Northern Ireland Assembly

Establishment
  - Government of Ireland Act 1920: 3 May 1921
  - Constitution Act 1973: 18 July 1973
  - Northern Ireland Act 1974: 17 July 1974
  - Northern Ireland Act 1998: 19 November 1998

Area
  - Total (Note: ONS Standard Area Measurement, area to Mean Sea Level (MSL) Belfast): 14,330 km^{2} (5,530 sq mi)
  - Land (Note: ONS Standard Area Measurement, area to Mean Sea Level (MSL) Belfast excluding inland water): 13,547 km^{2} (5,231 sq mi)

Population
  - 2025 estimate: 1,928,446
  - 2021 census: 1,903,175
  - Density: 142/km^{2} (367.8/sq mi)
- GVA: 2023 estimate
  - Total: £56.1 billion
  - Per capita: £29,234
- GDP (nominal): 2023 estimate
  - Total: £63.3 billion
  - Per capita: £32,944
- HDI (2022): ▲0.907 very high
- Currency: Sterling (Note: Commonly also known as the "pound" (the name of its base unit) or "pound sterling".) (GBP; £)
- Time zone: UTC+0 (GMT)
  - Summer (DST): UTC+1 (BST)
- Date format: dd/mm/yyyy (AD)
- Calling code: +44 (Note: +44 is always followed by 28 when calling landlines. The code is 028 within the UK and 048 from the Republic of Ireland where it is treated as a domestic call.)
- ISO 3166 code: GB-NIR
- 1. The official and de jure flag of Northern Ireland is the Union Jack. The Ulster Banner was used by the Parliament of Northern Ireland from 1953 until the latter was abolished in 1973. The Ulster Banner is still used by some organisations and entities and is used to represent Northern Ireland when it plays as a national sports team. See Northern Ireland flags issue for more.

Northern Ireland (Note: Irish: Tuaisceart Éireann [ˈt̪ˠuəʃcəɾˠt̪ˠ ˈeːɾʲən̪ˠ]; Ulster Scots: Norlin Airlann) is a part of the United Kingdom in the north-east of the island of Ireland. It has been variously described as a country, province or region. Northern Ireland shares an open border to the south and west with the Republic of Ireland. At the 2021 census, its population was 1,903,175, making up around 3% of the UK's population and 27% of the population on the island of Ireland. The Northern Ireland Assembly, established by the Northern Ireland Act 1998, holds responsibility for a range of devolved policy matters, while other areas are reserved for the UK Government. The government of Northern Ireland cooperates with the government of Ireland in several areas under the terms of the Good Friday Agreement. The Republic of Ireland also has a consultative role on non-devolved governmental matters through the British–Irish Intergovernmental Conference.

Northern Ireland was created in 1921, when Ireland was partitioned by the Government of Ireland Act 1920, creating a devolved government for the six northeastern counties. As was intended by unionists and their supporters in Westminster, Northern Ireland had a unionist majority, who wanted to remain in the United Kingdom; they were generally the Protestant descendants of colonists from Britain. Meanwhile, the majority in Southern Ireland (which became the Irish Free State in 1922), and a significant minority in Northern Ireland, were Irish nationalists (generally Catholics) who wanted a united independent Ireland. Today, the former generally see themselves as British and the latter generally see themselves as Irish, while a Northern Irish or Ulster identity is claimed by a significant minority from all backgrounds.

The creation of Northern Ireland was marred by violence between those for and against partition. During The Troubles in Ulster (1920–1922), the capital Belfast saw major communal violence, mainly between Protestant unionist and Catholic nationalist civilians. More than 500 were killed and more than 10,000 became refugees, mostly Catholics. For the next fifty years, Northern Ireland had an unbroken series of Unionist Party governments. There was informal mutual segregation by both communities, and the Unionist governments were accused of discrimination against the Irish nationalist and Catholic minority. In the late 1960s, a campaign to end discrimination against Catholics and nationalists was opposed by loyalists, who saw it as a republican front. This unrest sparked the Troubles, a thirty-year conflict involving republican and loyalist paramilitaries and state forces, which claimed over 3,500 lives and injured 50,000 others. The 1998 Good Friday Agreement was a major step in the peace process, including paramilitary disarmament and security normalisation, although sectarianism and segregation remain major social problems, and sporadic violence has continued.

The economy of Northern Ireland was the most industrialised in Ireland at the time of partition, but soon began to decline, exacerbated by the political and social turmoil of the Troubles. Its economy has grown significantly since the late 1990s. Unemployment in Northern Ireland peaked at 17.2% in 1986, but dropped back down to below 10% in the 2010s, similar to the rate of the rest of the UK. Cultural links between Northern Ireland, the rest of Ireland, and the rest of the UK are complex, with Northern Ireland sharing both the culture of Ireland and the culture of the United Kingdom. In many sports, there is an All-Ireland governing body or team for the whole island; the most notable exception is association football. Northern Ireland competes separately at the Commonwealth Games, and its athletes may compete for either Great Britain or Ireland at the Olympic Games.

== History ==
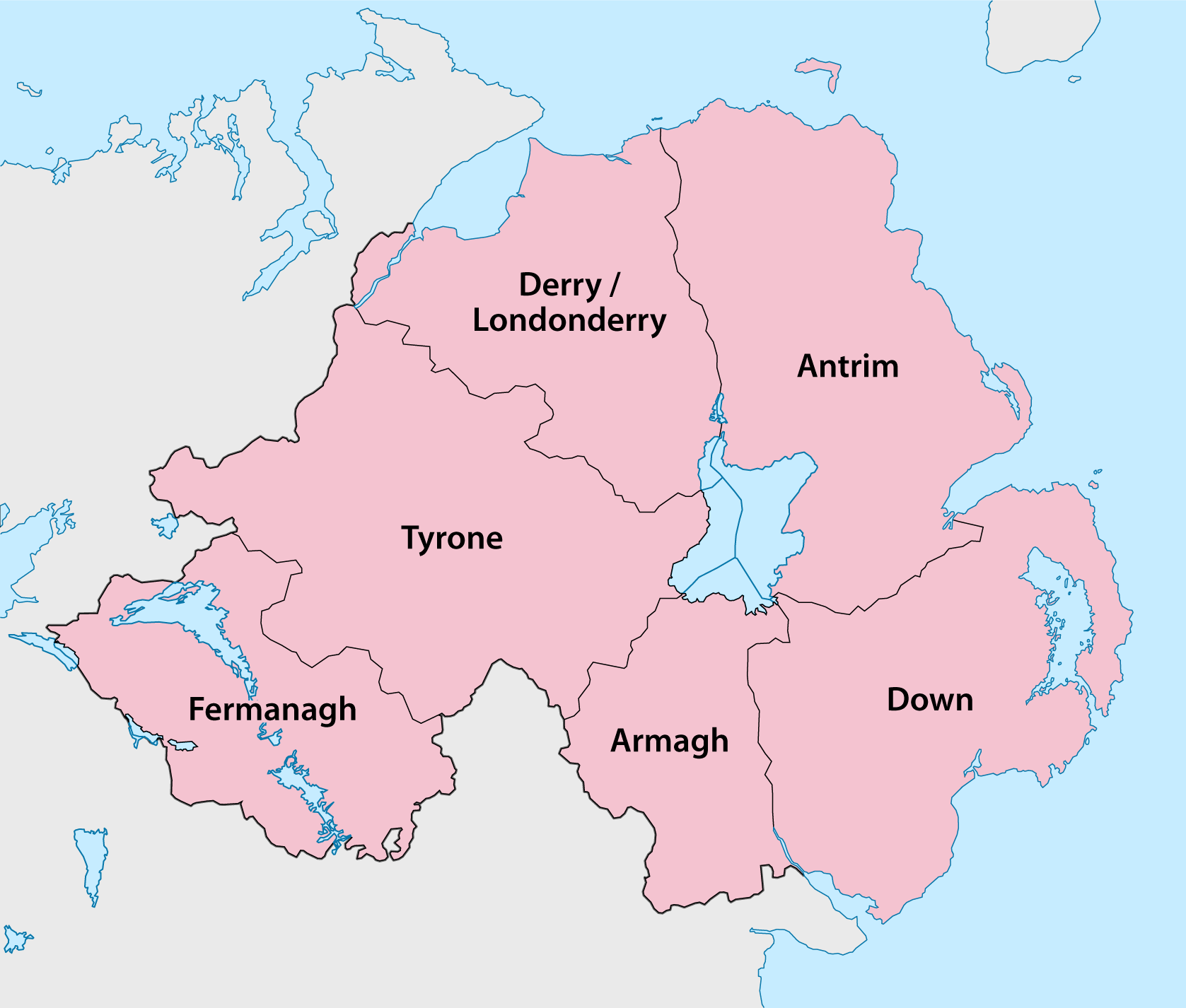
The traditional counties of Northern Ireland

The region now known as Northern Ireland was historically inhabited by Irish-speaking Gaels. It consisted of several Gaelic kingdoms within the province of Ulster. In 1169, Ireland was invaded by Anglo-Norman forces under the English crown, initiating centuries of foreign dominance. While English authority spread across much of Ireland, Ulster's major Gaelic kingdoms such as the Uí Néill largely retained their autonomy, with English control limited to parts of the eastern coast.

During the Nine Years' War (1593–1603), an alliance of Gaelic chieftains led by Hugh Roe O'Donnell and Hugh O'Neill resisted English rule. Despite early successes and support from Spain, the alliance was ultimately defeated, culminating in the Flight of the Earls in 1607, when many Ulster nobles fled to mainland Europe. Their lands were confiscated and colonized by English-speaking Protestant settlers from Britain in the Plantation of Ulster, establishing a lasting Protestant community with ties to Britain.

The Irish Rebellion of 1641 began in Ulster, driven by demands to end anti-Catholic discrimination, achieve greater Irish self-governance, and reverse the plantations. The uprising escalated into an ethnic conflict between Irish Catholics and British Protestant settlers and became part of the wider Wars of the Three Kingdoms (1639–1653), concluding with the English Parliamentarian conquest.

Subsequent Protestant victories in the Williamite-Jacobite War (1688–1691), including the Siege of Derry and the Battle of the Boyne, solidified Anglican Protestant rule in Ireland. These events are still commemorated by some Protestants in Northern Ireland. Many more Scots Protestants migrated to Ulster during the Scottish famine of the 1690s.

Following the Williamite victory, a series of Penal Laws were enacted by the Anglican Protestant ruling class to suppress Catholicism and, to a lesser extent, Presbyterianism. These laws aimed to concentrate property and public office in the hands of those aligned with the Church of Ireland. Between 1717 and 1775, approximately 200,000 Ulster Presbyterians emigrated to the American colonies, where their descendants are known as Scotch-Irish Americans.

In the late 18th century, secretive and militant societies emerged in Ulster, exacerbating sectarian tensions. The Protestant Peep o' Day Boys and the Catholic Defenders frequently clashed, notably during the Armagh disturbances, culminating in the Battle of the Diamond in 1795. This event led to the founding of the Protestant Orange Order.

The Irish Rebellion of 1798 was led by the Society of United Irishmen, a cross-community republican group founded by Belfast Presbyterians seeking Irish independence. The rebellion was ultimately suppressed, but it highlighted the growing demand for reform. In response, the British government enacted the Acts of Union 1800, merging the Kingdom of Ireland with Great Britain to form the United Kingdom of Great Britain and Ireland in 1801. This legislative union aimed to quell sectarianism, remove discriminatory laws, and prevent the spread of revolutionary ideas.

=== Home Rule crisis ===
Signing of the Ulster Covenant in 1912 in opposition to Home Rule

By the late 19th century, a large and disciplined cohort of Irish Nationalist MPs at Westminster committed the Liberal Party to Irish Home Rule—self-government for Ireland, within the United Kingdom. This was bitterly opposed by Irish Unionists, most of whom were Protestants, who feared an Irish devolved government dominated by Irish nationalists and Catholics. The Government of Ireland Bill 1886 and Government of Ireland Bill 1893 were defeated. However, from 1910, the Liberal government was dependent on Nationalist support, and the Parliament Act 1911 prevented the House of Lords from blocking the bill indefinitely.

In response, unionists vowed to prevent Irish Home Rule, from Conservative and Unionist Party leaders such as Bonar Law and Dublin-based barrister Edward Carson to militant working class unionists in Ireland. This sparked the Home Rule crisis. In September 1912, more than 500,000 unionists signed the Ulster Covenant, pledging to oppose Home Rule by any means and to defy any Irish government. In 1914, unionists smuggled thousands of rifles and rounds of ammunition from Imperial Germany for use by the Ulster Volunteers (UVF), a paramilitary organisation formed to oppose Home Rule. Irish nationalists had also formed a paramilitary organisation, the Irish Volunteers. It sought to ensure Home Rule was implemented, and it smuggled its own weapons into Ireland a few months after the Ulster Volunteers. Ireland seemed to be on the brink of civil war.

Unionists were in a minority in Ireland as a whole, but a majority in the province of Ulster, especially the counties Antrim, Down, Armagh and Londonderry. Unionists argued that if Home Rule could not be stopped then all or part of Ulster should be excluded from it. In May 1914, the UK Government introduced an Amending Bill to allow for 'Ulster' to be excluded from Home Rule. There was then debate over how much of Ulster should be excluded and for how long. Some Ulster unionists were willing to tolerate the 'loss' of some mainly-Catholic areas of the province. The crisis was interrupted by the outbreak of the First World War in August 1914, and Ireland's involvement in it. The UK government abandoned the Amending Bill, and instead rushed through a new bill, the Suspensory Act 1914, suspending Home Rule for the duration of the war, with the exclusion of Ulster still to be decided.

=== Partition of Ireland ===
Result of the 1918 general election in Ireland

By the end of the war (during which the 1916 Easter Rising had taken place), most Irish nationalists now wanted full independence rather than home rule. In September 1919, British Prime Minister David Lloyd George tasked a committee with planning another home rule bill. Headed by English unionist politician Walter Long, it was known as the 'Long Committee'. It decided that two devolved governments should be established—one for the nine counties of Ulster and one for the rest of Ireland—together with a Council of Ireland for the "encouragement of Irish unity". Most Ulster unionists wanted the territory of the Ulster government to be reduced to six counties so that it would have a larger Protestant unionist majority, which they believed would guarantee its longevity. The six counties of Antrim, Down, Armagh, Londonderry, Tyrone and Fermanagh comprised the maximum area unionists believed they could dominate. The area that was to become Northern Ireland included counties Fermanagh and Tyrone, even though they had nationalist majorities in the 1918 Irish general election.

Events overtook the government. In the 1918 Irish general election, the pro-independence Sinn Féin party won the overwhelming majority of Irish seats. Sinn Féin's elected members boycotted the British parliament and founded a separate Irish parliament (Dáil Éireann), declaring an independent Irish Republic covering the whole island. Many Irish republicans blamed the British establishment for the sectarian divisions in Ireland, and believed that Ulster unionism would fade once British rule was ended. The British authorities outlawed the Dáil in September 1919, and a guerrilla conflict developed as the Irish Republican Army (IRA) began attacking British forces. This became known as the Irish War of Independence.

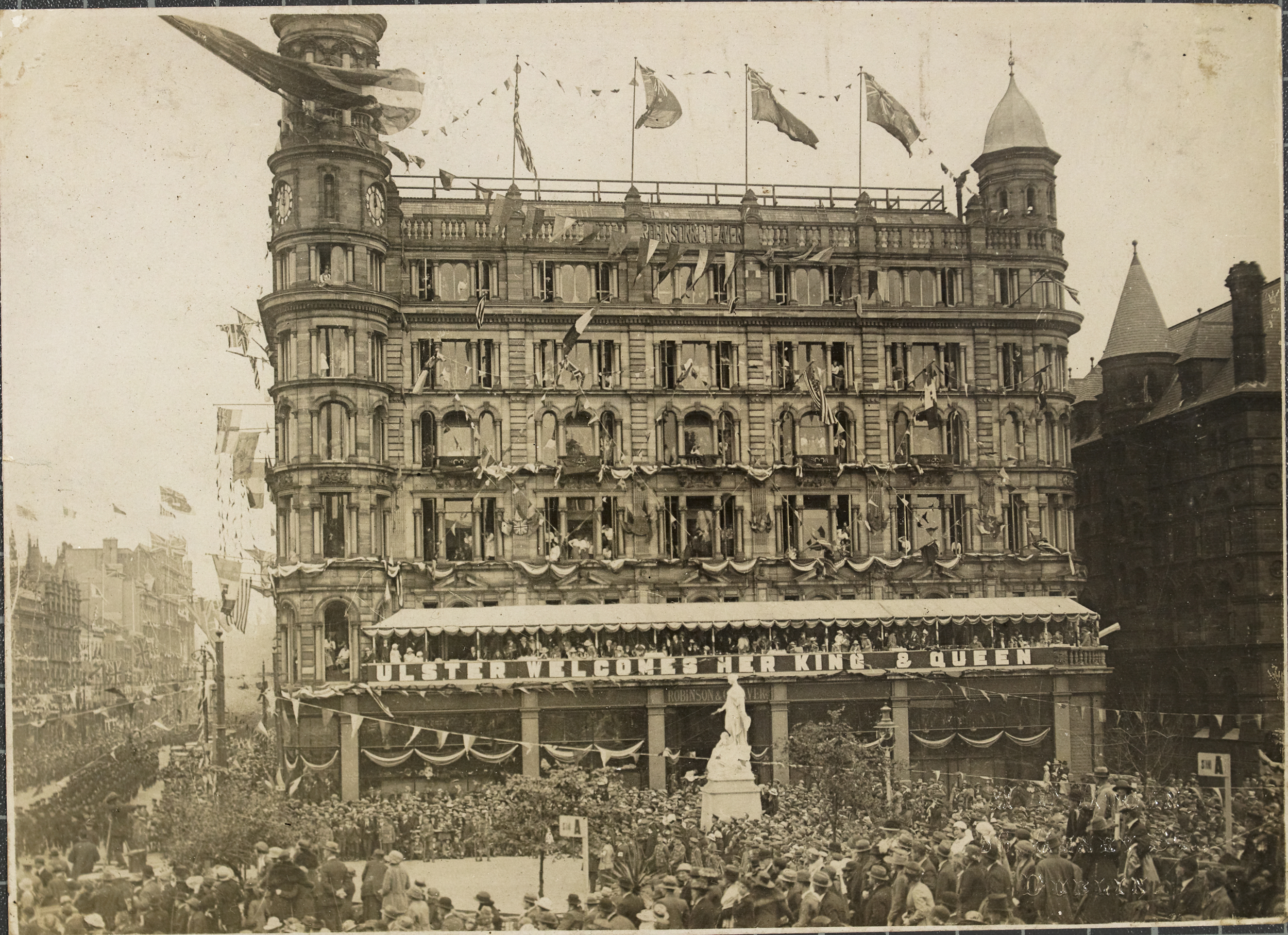
Crowds in Belfast for the state opening of the Northern Ireland Parliament on 22 June 1921

Meanwhile, the Government of Ireland Act 1920 passed through the British parliament in 1920. It would divide Ireland into two self-governing UK territories: the six northeastern counties (Northern Ireland) being ruled from Belfast, and the other twenty-six counties (Southern Ireland) being ruled from Dublin. Both would have a shared Lord Lieutenant of Ireland, who would appoint both governments and a Council of Ireland, which the UK government intended to evolve into an all-Ireland parliament. The Act received royal assent that December, becoming the Government of Ireland Act 1920. It came into force on 3 May 1921, partitioning Ireland and creating Northern Ireland. the 1921 Irish elections were held on 24 May, in which unionists won most seats in the Northern Ireland parliament. It first met on 7 June and formed its first devolved government, headed by Ulster Unionist Party leader James Craig. Irish nationalist members refused to attend. King George V addressed the ceremonial opening of the Northern parliament on 22 June.

During 1920–22, in what became Northern Ireland, partition was accompanied by violence "in defence or opposition to the new settlement" during The Troubles in Ulster (1920–1922). The IRA carried out attacks on British forces in the north-east but was less active than in the rest of Ireland. Protestant loyalists attacked Catholics in reprisal for IRA actions. In the summer of 1920, sectarian violence erupted in Belfast and Derry, and there were mass burnings of Catholic property in Lisburn and Banbridge. Conflict continued intermittently for two years, mostly in Belfast, which saw "savage and unprecedented" communal violence between Protestants and Catholics, including rioting, gun battles, and bombings. Homes, businesses, and churches were attacked and people were expelled from workplaces and mixed neighbourhoods. More than 500 were killed and more than 10,000 became refugees, most of them Catholics. The British Army was deployed and the Ulster Special Constabulary (USC) was formed to help the regular police. The USC was almost wholly Protestant. Members of the USC and regular police were involved in reprisal attacks on Catholic civilians. A truce between British forces and the IRA was established on 11 July 1921, ending the fighting in most of Ireland. However, communal violence continued in Belfast, and in May 1922 the IRA launched a guerrilla offensive along the new Irish border, which ended in failure only a month later.

The Anglo-Irish Treaty was signed between representatives of the governments of the UK and the Irish Republic on 6 December 1921, laying out the process for the creation of the Irish Free State. Under the terms of the treaty, Northern Ireland would become part of the Free State unless its government opted out by presenting an address to the king, although in practice partition remained in place.

The Coat of arms of the Government of Northern Ireland used between 1924 and 1973

The Irish Free State came into existence on 6 December 1922, and on the following day, the Parliament of Northern Ireland resolved to exercise its right to opt out of the Free State by making an address to King George V. The text of the address was:

Most Gracious Sovereign, We, your Majesty's most dutiful and loyal subjects, the Senators and Commons of Northern Ireland in Parliament assembled, having learnt of the passing of the Irish Free State Constitution Act 1922, being the Act of Parliament for the ratification of the Articles of Agreement for a Treaty between Great Britain and Ireland, do, by this humble Address, pray your Majesty that the powers of the Parliament and Government of the Irish Free State shall no longer extend to Northern Ireland.

Shortly afterwards, the Irish Boundary Commission was established to decide on the border between the Irish Free State and Northern Ireland. Owing to the outbreak of the Irish Civil War, the work of the commission was delayed until 1925. The Free State government and Irish nationalists hoped for a large transfer of territory to the Free State, as many border areas had nationalist majorities. Many believed this would leave the remaining Northern Ireland territory too small to be viable. However, the commission's final report recommended only small transfers of territory, and in both directions. The Free State, Northern Ireland, and UK governments agreed to suppress the report and accept the status quo, while the UK government agreed that the Free State would no longer have to pay a share of the UK national debt.

=== Established government and boundaries ===
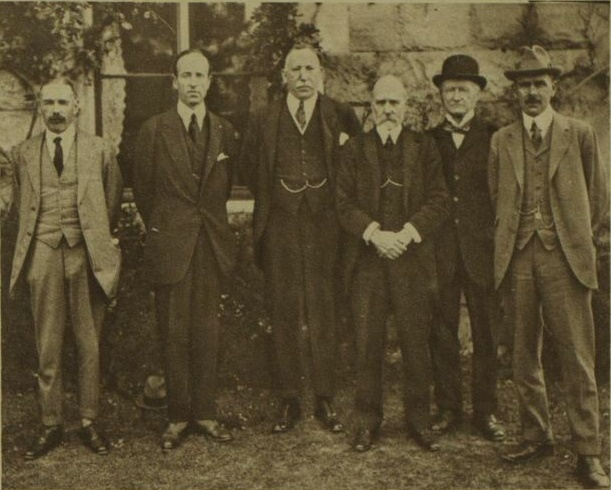
James Craig (centre) with members of the first government of Northern Ireland

Northern Ireland's border was drawn to give it "a decisive Protestant majority". At the time of its creation, Northern Ireland's population was two-thirds Protestant and one-third Catholic. Most Protestants were unionists/loyalists who sought to maintain Northern Ireland as a part of the United Kingdom, while most Catholics were Irish nationalists/republicans who sought an independent United Ireland. There was mutual self-imposed segregation in Northern Ireland between Protestants and Catholics such as in education, housing, and often employment.

For its first fifty years, Northern Ireland had an unbroken series of Ulster Unionist Party governments. Every prime minister and almost every minister of these governments were members of the Orange Order, as were all but 11 of the 149 Ulster Unionist Party (UUP) MPs elected during this time. Almost all judges and magistrates were Protestant, many of them closely associated with the UUP. Northern Ireland's new police force was the Royal Ulster Constabulary (RUC), which succeeded the Royal Irish Constabulary (RIC). It too was almost wholly Protestant and lacked operational independence, responding to directions from government ministers. The RUC and the reserve Ulster Special Constabulary (USC) were militarized police forces due to the perceived threat of militant republicanism. In 1936 the British advocacy group - the National Council for Civil Liberties characterised the USC as "nothing but the organised army of the Unionist party". They "had at their disposal the Special Powers Act, a sweeping piece of legislation which allowed arrests without warrant, internment without trial, unlimited search powers, and bans on meetings and publications". This 1922 Act was made permanent in 1933 and was not repealed until 1973.

The Nationalist Party was the main political party in opposition to the UUP governments. However, its elected members often protested by abstaining from the Northern Ireland parliament, and many nationalists did not vote in parliamentary elections. Other early nationalist groups which campaigned against partition included the National League of the North (formed in 1928), the Northern Council for Unity (formed in 1937) and the Irish Anti-Partition League (formed in 1945).

The Local Government Act (Northern Ireland) of 1922 allowed for the altering of municipal and rural boundaries. This Act led to the gerrymandering of local election boundaries in the Nationalists majority cities of Derry City, Enniskillen, Omagh, Armagh and many other towns and rural districts. That action ensured Unionist control over local councils in areas where they were a minority. The UUP governments, and some UUP-dominated local authorities, discriminated against the Catholic and Irish nationalist minority; especially by the gerrymandering of local electoral boundaries, the allocation of public housing, public sector employment, and policing, showing "a consistent and irrefutable pattern of deliberate discrimination against Catholics". Many Catholics/Nationalists saw the gerrymandered local electoral boundaries and the abolishing of proportional representation as proof of government-sponsored discrimination. Until 1969 a system was in place called plural voting which was a practice whereby one person might be able to vote multiple times in an election. Property and business owners could vote both in the constituency where their property lay and that in which they lived, if the two were different. This system often resulted in one person being able to cast multiple votes. Decades later, UUP First Minister of Northern Ireland, David Trimble, said that Northern Ireland under the UUP had been a "cold house" for Catholics.

=== Offer of Irish unity ===
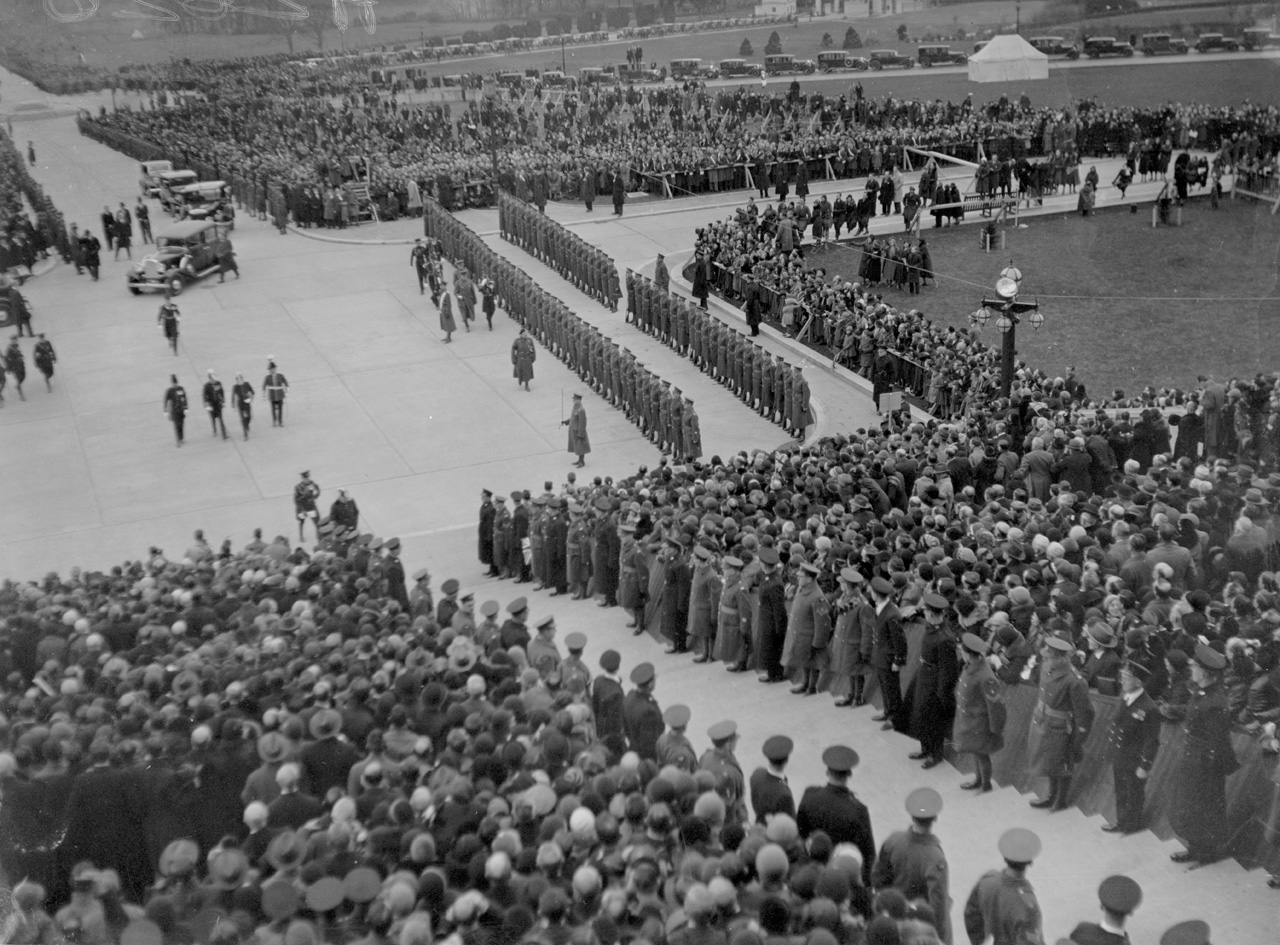
Opening of the Northern Ireland parliament buildings (Stormont) in 1932

During World War II, recruitment to the British military was noticeably lower than the high levels reached during World War I. In June 1940, to encourage the neutral Irish state to join with the Allies, British Prime Minister Winston Churchill indicated to Taoiseach Éamon de Valera that the British government would encourage Irish unity, but believing that Churchill could not deliver, de Valera declined the offer. The British did not inform the government of Northern Ireland that they had made the offer to the Dublin government, and de Valera's rejection was not publicised until 1970. Belfast was a key industrial city in the UK's war effort, producing ships, tanks, aircraft, and munitions. The unemployment that had been so persistent in the 1930s disappeared, and labour shortages appeared, prompting migration from the Free State. The city was thinly defended, and had only 24 anti-aircraft guns. Richard Dawson Bates, the Minister for Home Affairs, had prepared too late, assuming that Belfast was far enough away to be safe. The city's fire brigade was inadequate, and as the Northern Ireland government had been reluctant to spend money on air raid shelters, it only started to build them after the Blitz in London during the autumn of 1940. There were no searchlights in the city, which made shooting down enemy bombers more difficult. In April–May 1941, the Belfast Blitz began when the Luftwaffe launched a series of raids that were the most deadly seen outside London. Working-class areas in the north and east of the city were particularly hard hit, and over 1,000 people were killed and hundreds were seriously injured. Tens of thousands of people fled the city in fear of future attacks. In the final raid, Luftwaffe bombs inflicted extensive damage to the docks and the Harland & Wolff shipyard, closing it for six months. Half of the city's houses had been destroyed, highlighting the terrible slum conditions in Belfast, and about £20 million worth of damage was caused. The Northern Ireland government was criticised heavily for its lack of preparation, and Northern Ireland Prime Minister J. M. Andrews resigned. There was a major munitions strike in 1944.

The Ireland Act 1949 gave the first legal guarantee that the region would not cease to be part of the United Kingdom without the consent of the Parliament of Northern Ireland. From 1956 to 1962, the Irish Republican Army (IRA) carried out a limited guerrilla campaign in border areas of Northern Ireland, called the Border Campaign. It aimed to destabilize Northern Ireland and bring about an end to partition but failed. In 1965, Northern Ireland's Prime Minister Terence O'Neill met the Taoiseach, Seán Lemass. It was the first meeting between the two heads of government since partition.

=== The Troubles ===
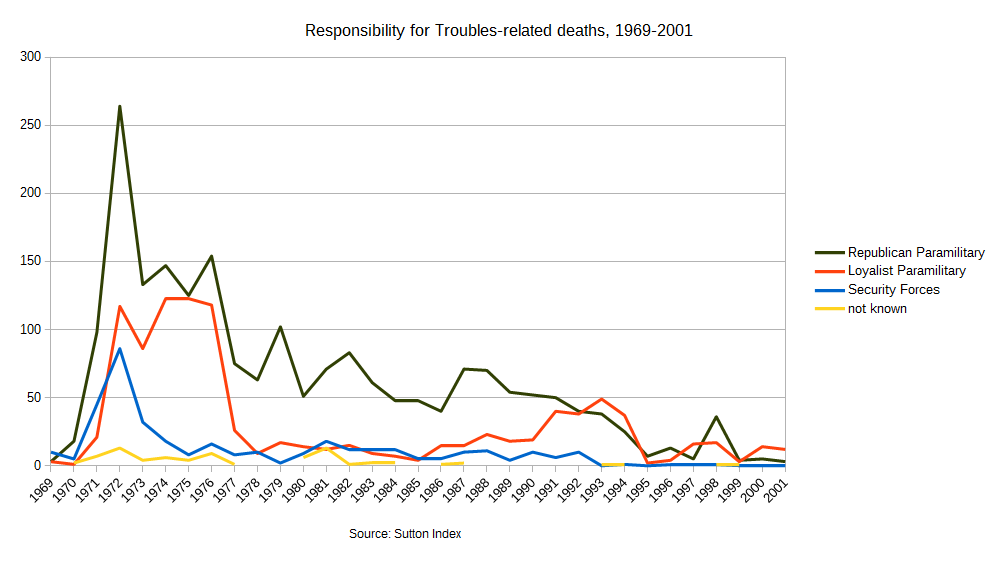
Responsibility for Troubles-related deaths between 1969 and 2001

The Troubles, which started in the late 1960s, consisted of about 30 years of recurring acts of intense violence during which 3,254 people were killed with over 50,000 casualties. From 1969 to 2003 there were over 36,900 shooting incidents and over 16,200 bombings or attempted bombings associated with The Troubles. The conflict was caused by escalating tensions between the Irish nationalist minority and the dominant unionist majority; Irish nationalists object to Northern Ireland staying within the United Kingdom. From 1967 to 1972 the Northern Ireland Civil Rights Association (NICRA), which modelled itself on the US civil rights movement, led a campaign of civil resistance to anti-Catholic discrimination in housing, employment, policing, and electoral procedures. The franchise for local government elections included only rate-payers and their spouses, and so excluded over a quarter of the electorate. While the majority of disenfranchised electors were Protestant, Catholics were over-represented since they were poorer and had more adults still living in the family home.

NICRA's campaign, seen by many unionists as an Irish republican front, and the violent reaction to it proved to be a precursor to a more violent period. As early as 1969, armed campaigns of paramilitary groups began, including the Provisional IRA campaign of 1969–1997 which was aimed at the end of British rule in Northern Ireland and the creation of a United Ireland, and the Ulster Volunteer Force, formed in 1966 in response to the perceived erosion of both the British character and unionist domination of Northern Ireland. The state security forces – the British Army and the police (the Royal Ulster Constabulary) – were also involved in the violence. The UK Government's position is that its forces were neutral in the conflict, trying to uphold law and order in Northern Ireland and the right of the people of Northern Ireland to democratic self-determination. Republicans regarded the state forces as combatants in the conflict, pointing to the collusion between the state forces and the loyalist paramilitaries as proof of this. The "Ballast" investigation by the Police Ombudsman for Northern Ireland has confirmed that British forces, and in particular the RUC, did collude with loyalist paramilitaries, were involved in murder, and did obstruct the course of justice when such claims had been investigated, although the extent to which such collusion occurred is still disputed.

As a consequence of the worsening security situation, the autonomous regional government for Northern Ireland was suspended in 1972. Alongside the violence, there was a political deadlock between the major political parties in Northern Ireland, including those who condemned the violence, over the future status of Northern Ireland and the form of government there should be within Northern Ireland. In 1973, Northern Ireland held a referendum to determine if it should remain in the United Kingdom, or be part of a united Ireland. The vote went heavily in favour (98.9%) of maintaining the status quo. Approximately 57.5% of the total electorate voted in support, but only 1% of Catholics voted following a boycott organised by the Social Democratic and Labour Party (SDLP). The deaths of 10 men during the 1981 Irish hunger strike brought worldwide attention to the Republican prisoners being held in prison (HM Prison Maze) in Northern Ireland.

=== Peace process ===
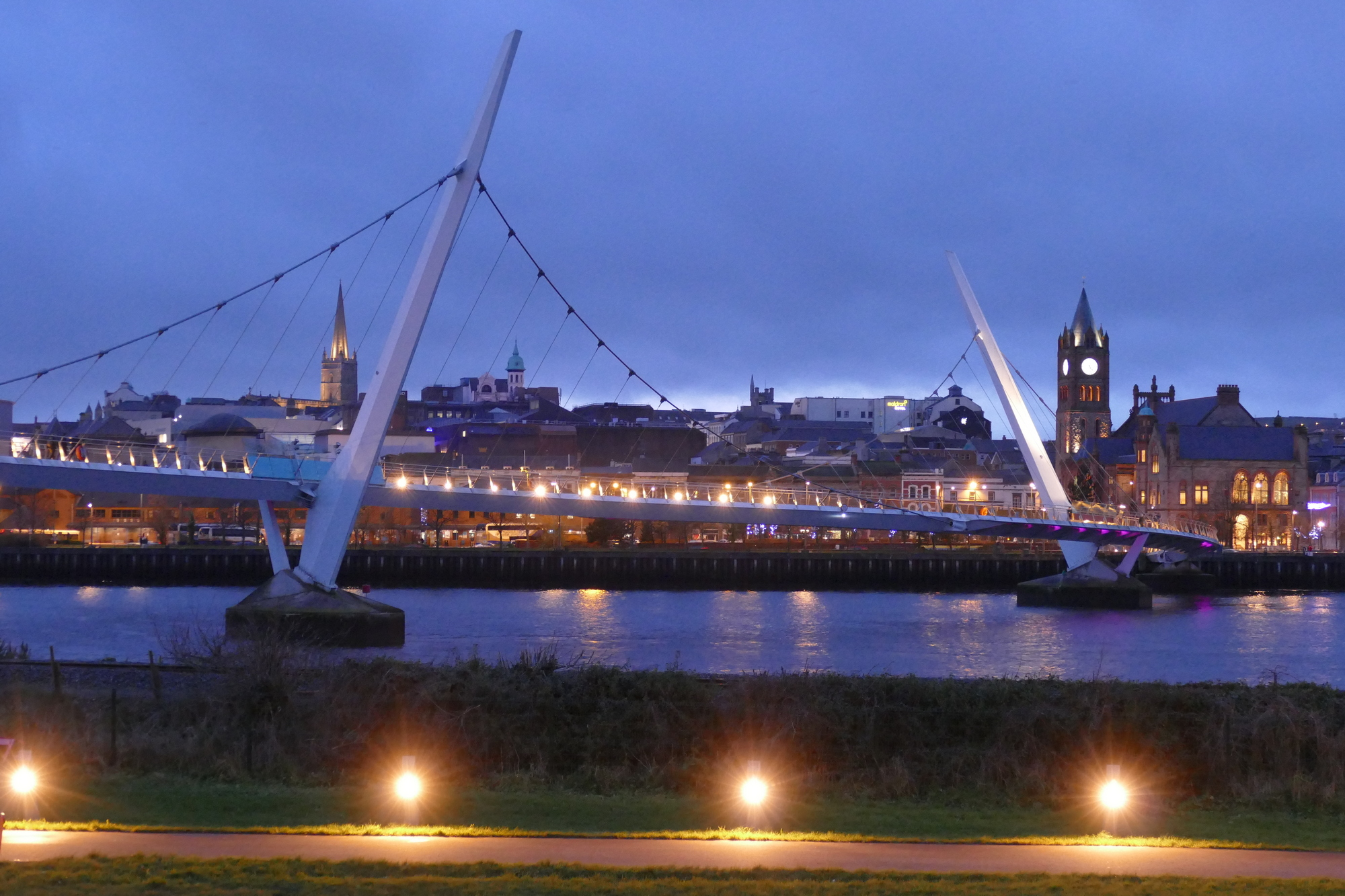
Derry Peace Bridge, over the River Foyle

The Troubles were brought to an uneasy end by a peace process that included the declaration of ceasefires by most paramilitary organisations and the complete decommissioning of their weapons, the reform of the police, and the corresponding withdrawal of army troops from the streets and sensitive border areas such as South Armagh and Fermanagh, as agreed by the signatories to the Good Friday Agreement (also known as the "Belfast Agreement"). This reiterated the long-held British position, which had never before been fully acknowledged by successive Irish governments, that Northern Ireland will remain within the United Kingdom until a majority of voters in Northern Ireland decides otherwise. The Constitution of Ireland was amended in 1999 to remove a claim of the "Irish nation" to sovereignty over the entire island (in Article 2).

The new Articles 2 and 3, added to the Constitution to replace the earlier articles, implicitly acknowledge that the status of Northern Ireland, and its relationships within the rest of the United Kingdom and with the Republic of Ireland, would only be changed with the agreement of a majority of voters in each jurisdiction. This aspect was also central to the Belfast Agreement which was signed in 1998 and ratified by referendums held simultaneously in both Northern Ireland and the Republic. At the same time, the UK Government recognised for the first time, as part of the prospective, the so-called "Irish dimension": the principle that the people of the island of Ireland as a whole have the right, without any outside interference, to solve the issues between North and South by mutual consent. The latter statement was key to winning support for the agreement from nationalists. It established a devolved power-sharing government, the Northern Ireland Assembly, located on the Stormont Estate, which must consist of both unionist and nationalist parties. These institutions were suspended by the UK Government in 2002 after Police Service of Northern Ireland (PSNI) allegations of spying by people working for Sinn Féin at the Assembly (Stormontgate). The resulting case against the accused Sinn Féin member collapsed.

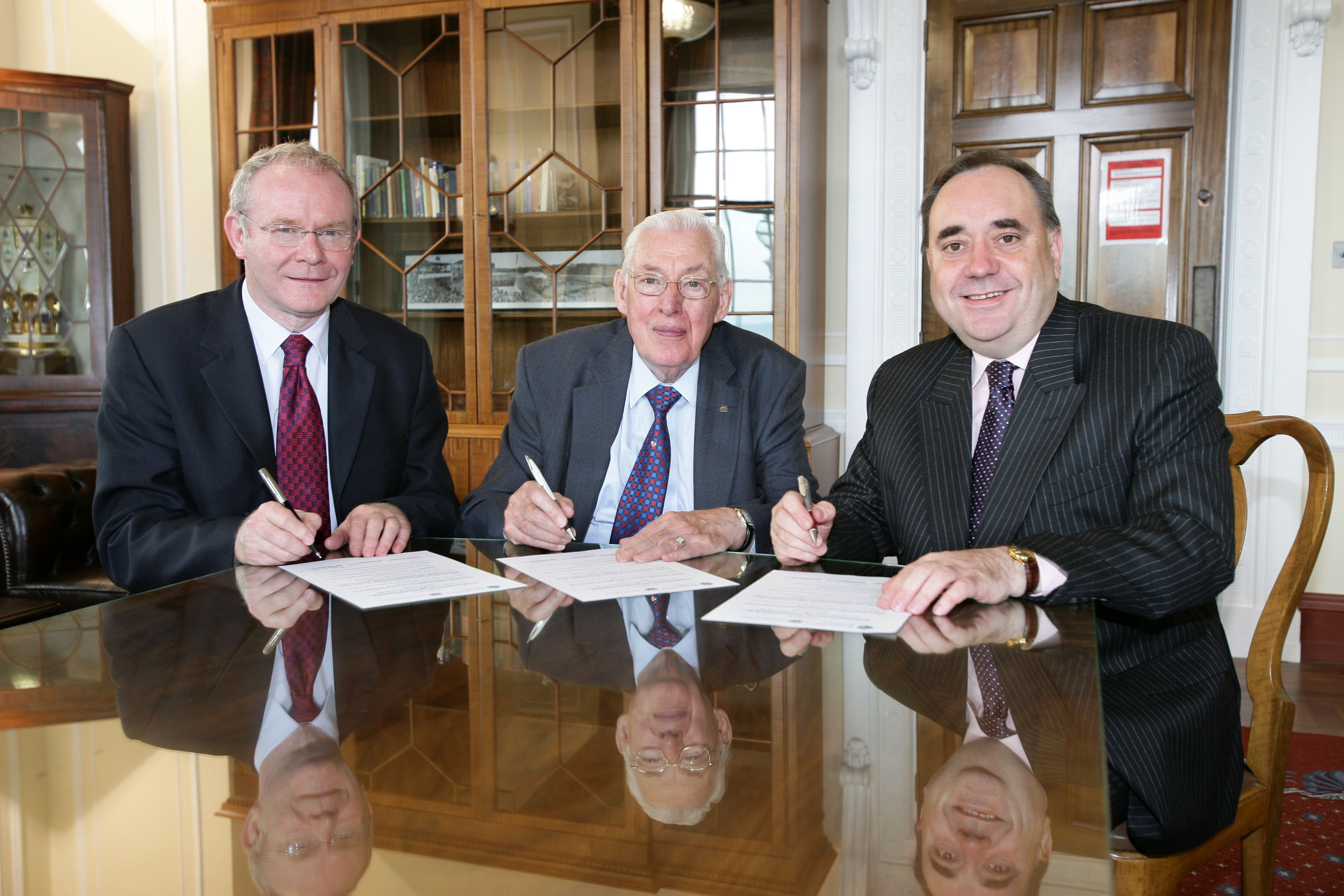
First Minister Ian Paisley and deputy First Minister Martin McGuinness, signs the Joint Agreement with First Minister of Scotland, Alex Salmond, May 2008

On 28 July 2005, the Provisional IRA declared an end to its campaign and has since decommissioned what is thought to be all of its arsenal. This final act of decommissioning was performed under the watch of the Independent International Commission on Decommissioning (IICD) and two external church witnesses. Many unionists, however, remained sceptical. The IICD later confirmed that the main loyalist paramilitary groups, the Ulster Defence Association, UVF, and the Red Hand Commando, had decommissioned what is thought to be all of their arsenals, witnessed by former archbishop Robin Eames and a former top civil servant.

Politicians elected to the Assembly at the 2003 Assembly election were called together on 15 May 2006 under the Northern Ireland Act 2006 to elect a First Minister and deputy First Minister of Northern Ireland and choose the members of an Executive (before 25 November 2006) as a preliminary step to the restoration of devolved government.

Following the election on 7 March 2007, the devolved government returned on 8 May 2007 with Democratic Unionist Party (DUP) leader Ian Paisley and Sinn Féin deputy leader Martin McGuinness taking office as First Minister and deputy First Minister, respectively. In its white paper on Brexit the United Kingdom government reiterated its commitment to the Belfast Agreement. Concerning Northern Ireland's status, it said that the UK Government's "clearly-stated preference is to retain Northern Ireland's current constitutional position: as part of the UK, but with strong links to Ireland".

=== Executive crisis 2022–2024 ===
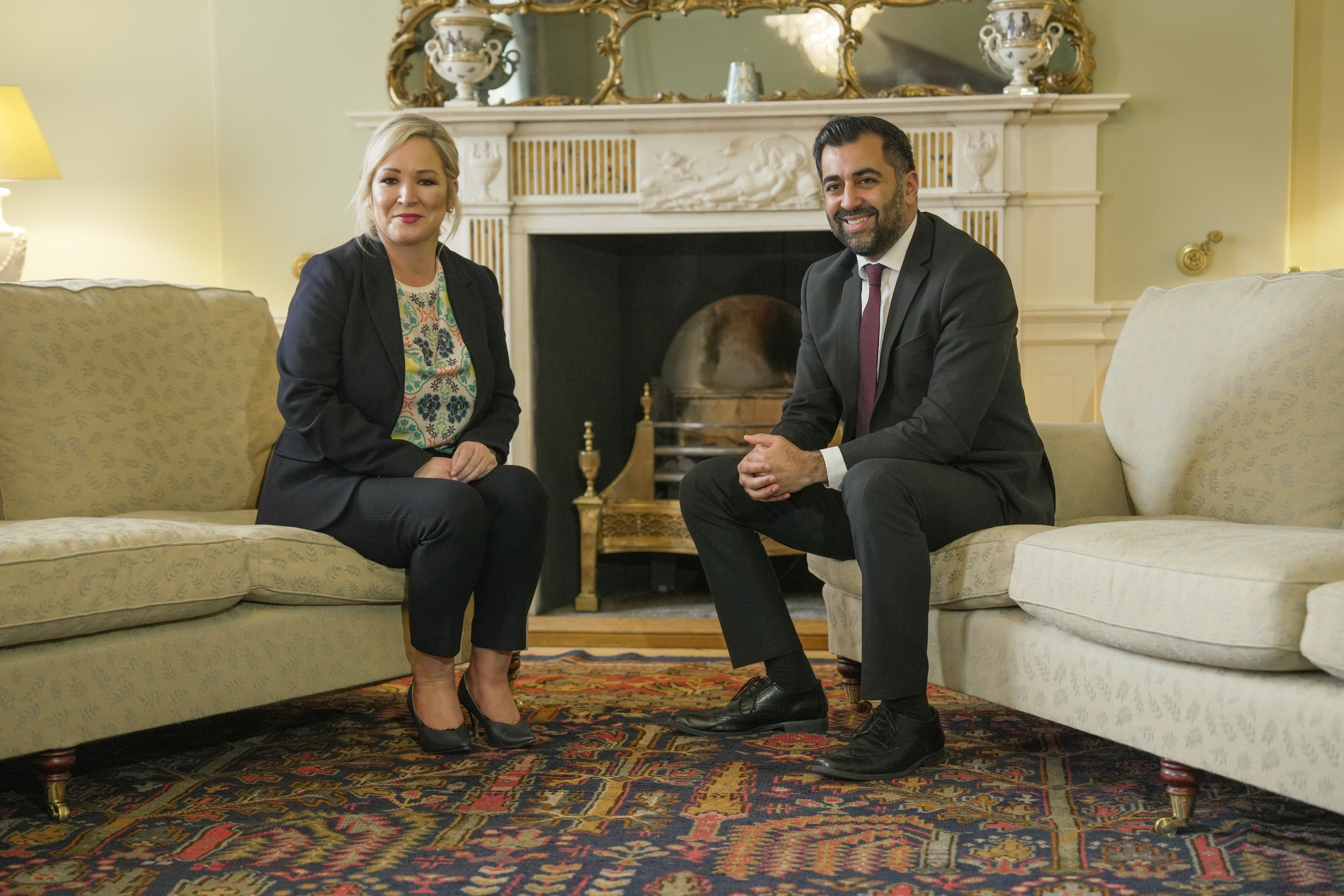
O'Neill, as First Minister–designate, meets with First Minister of Scotland, Humza Yousaf, 2022

On 3 February 2022, Paul Givan resigned as first minister, which automatically resigned Michelle O'Neill as deputy first minister and collapsed the executive of Northern Ireland. Following the 2022 Assembly election, Sinn Féin won the largest number of seats with 27 seats, becoming the largest political party in the Northern Ireland Assembly. Their unionist counterparts, the Democratic Unionist Party (DUP) came second with 25 seats. As a result of being the largest party, this put O'Neill in line to become the First Minister of Northern Ireland and the DUP leader to become the deputy First Minister of Northern Ireland. However, O'Neill did not take up the position until February 2024 because, as part of its opposition to the Northern Ireland Protocol, the DUP refused to nominate a deputy First minister and there was therefore no functioning executive of Northern Ireland.

On 30 January 2024, leader of the DUP Jeffrey Donaldson announced that the DUP would restore an executive government on the condition that new legislation was passed by the UK House of Commons. This paved the way for O'Neill, as nationalist leader to be sworn in as First Minister of Northern Ireland. O'Neill assumed office on 3 February 2024, becoming the first ever Irish nationalist, republican or Catholic to hold that position. In her Stormont acceptance speech, she again broke with republican tradition, by using the term, Northern Ireland. She pledged in her speech to represent all and to show respect to the royal family. On 5 February, O'Neill held meetings with Rishi Sunak, Chris Heaton-Harris, Leo Varadkar and ministers of the Northern Ireland Executive. High on the agenda is the request for additional financial support for the Northern Ireland government in excess of the £3.3 billion package already pledged from the HM Treasury.

In November 2024, O'Neill became the first senior Sinn Féin figure to take part in an official Remembrance Sunday ceremony, laying a laurel wreath at the Belfast Cenotaph at City Hall. A banner was subsequently hung outside her office brandishing O'Neill a "traitor"; police investigated the incident as "hate-motivated".

== Politics ==
=== Background ===
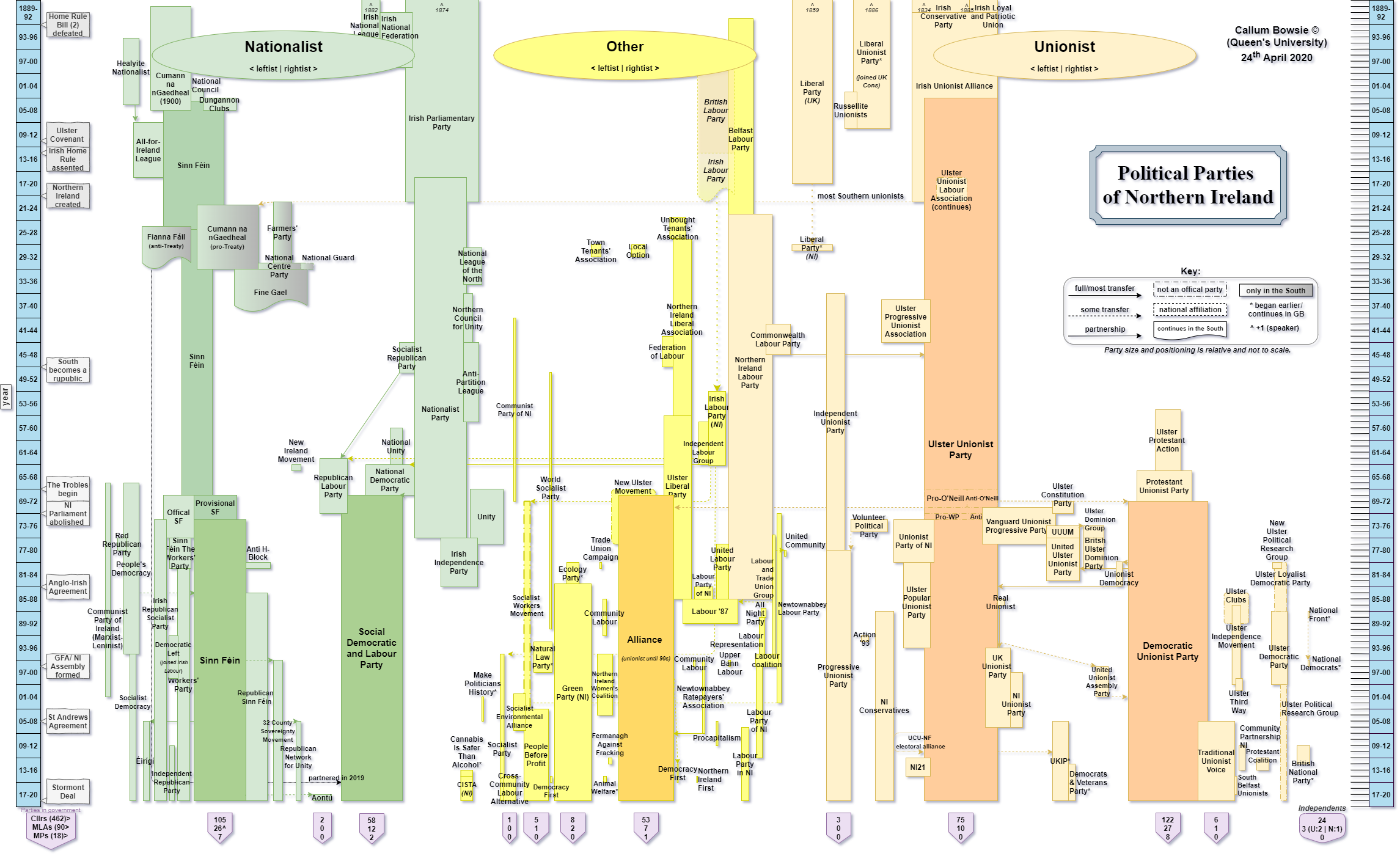
A flowchart illustrating all the political parties that have existed throughout the history of Northern Ireland and leading up to its formation (covering 1889 to 2020)

The main political divide in Northern Ireland is between unionists, who wish to see Northern Ireland continue as part of the United Kingdom, and nationalists, who wish to see Northern Ireland unified with the Republic of Ireland, independent from the United Kingdom. These two opposing views are linked to deeper cultural divisions. Unionists are predominantly Ulster Protestant, descendants of mainly Scottish, English, and Huguenot settlers as well as Gaels who converted to one of the Protestant denominations. Nationalists are overwhelmingly Catholic and descend from the population predating the settlement, with a minority from the Scottish Highlands as well as some converts from Protestantism. Discrimination against nationalists under the Stormont government (1921–1972) gave rise to the civil rights movement in the 1960s.

While some unionists argue that discrimination was not just due to religious or political bigotry, but also the result of more complex socio-economic, socio-political and geographical factors, its existence, and the manner in which nationalist anger at it was handled, were a major contributing factor to the Troubles. The political unrest went through its most violent phase between 1968 and 1994.

In 2007, 36% of the population defined themselves as unionist, 24% as nationalist, and 40% defined themselves as neither. According to a 2015 opinion poll, 70% express a long-term preference of the maintenance of Northern Ireland's membership of the United Kingdom (either directly ruled or with devolved government), while 14% express a preference for membership of a united Ireland. This discrepancy can be explained by the overwhelming preference among Protestants to remain a part of the UK (93%), while Catholic preferences are spread across several solutions to the constitutional question including remaining a part of the UK (47%), a united Ireland (32%), Northern Ireland becoming an independent state (4%), and those who "don't know" (16%).

Official voting figures, which reflect views on the "national question" along with issues of the candidate, geography, personal loyalty, and historic voting patterns, show 54% of Northern Ireland voters vote for unionist parties, 42% vote for nationalist parties, and 4% vote "other". Opinion polls consistently show that the election results are not necessarily an indication of the electorate's stance regarding the constitutional status of Northern Ireland. Most of the population of Northern Ireland is at least nominally Christian, mostly Roman Catholic and Protestant denominations. Many voters (regardless of religious affiliation) are attracted to unionism's conservative policies, while other voters are instead attracted to the traditionally leftist Sinn Féin and SDLP and their respective party platforms for democratic socialism and social democracy.

For the most part, Protestants feel a strong connection with Great Britain and wish for Northern Ireland to remain part of the United Kingdom. Many Catholics however, generally aspire to a United Ireland or are less certain about how to solve the constitutional question. Catholics have a slight majority in Northern Ireland, according to the latest Northern Ireland census. The make-up of the Northern Ireland Assembly reflects the appeals of the various parties within the population. Of the 90 Members of the Legislative Assembly (MLAs), 37 are unionists and 35 are nationalists (the remaining 18 are classified as "other").

The 1998 Good Friday Agreement acts as a de facto constitution for Northern Ireland. Local government in Northern Ireland since 2015 has been divided between 11 councils with limited responsibilities. The First Minister and deputy First Minister of Northern Ireland are the joint heads of government of Northern Ireland.

=== Governance ===
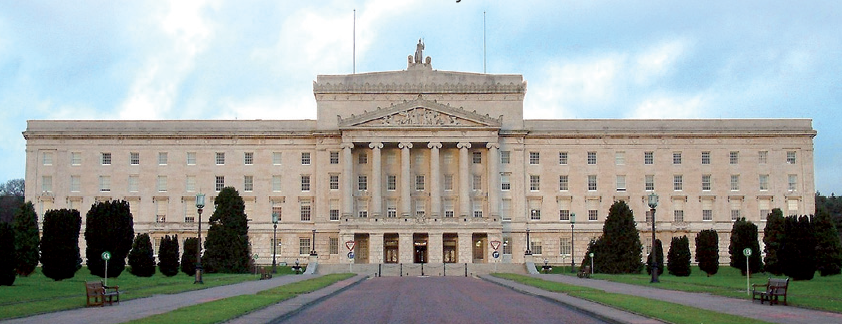
Parliament Buildings at Stormont, Belfast, seat of the assembly

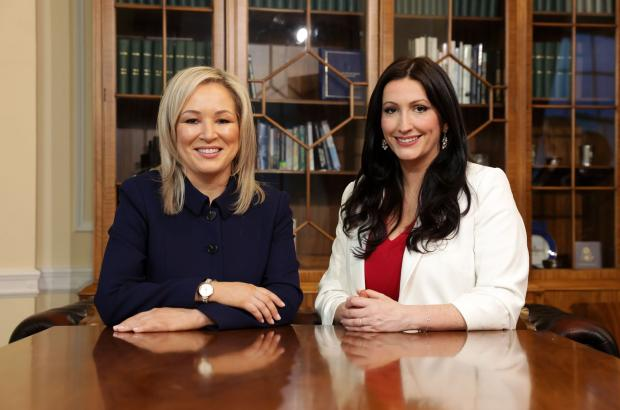
Michelle O'Neill (left) and Emma Little-Pengelly (right), the incumbent First Minister and Deputy First Minister of Northern Ireland respectively (since 2024)

Since 1998, Northern Ireland has had devolved government within the United Kingdom, presided over by the Northern Ireland Assembly and a cross-community government (the Northern Ireland Executive). The UK Government and UK Parliament are responsible for reserved and excepted matters. Reserved matters comprise listed policy areas (such as civil aviation, units of measurement, and human genetics) that Parliament may devolve to the Assembly some time in the future. Excepted matters (such as international relations, taxation and elections) are never expected to be considered for devolution. On all other governmental matters, the Executive together with the 90-member Assembly may legislate for and govern Northern Ireland. Devolution in Northern Ireland is dependent upon participation by members of the Northern Ireland executive in the North/South Ministerial Council, which coordinates areas of cooperation (such as agriculture, education, and health) between Northern Ireland and the Republic of Ireland. Additionally, "in recognition of the Irish Government's special interest in Northern Ireland", the Government of Ireland and Government of the United Kingdom co-operate closely on non-devolved matters through the British–Irish Intergovernmental Conference.

Elections to the Northern Ireland Assembly are by single transferable vote with five Members of the Legislative Assembly (MLAs) elected from each of 18 parliamentary constituencies. In addition, eighteen representatives (Members of Parliament, MPs) are elected to the lower house of the UK parliament from the same constituencies using the first-past-the-post system. However, not all of those elected take their seats. Sinn Féin MPs, currently seven, refuse to take the oath to serve the King that is required before MPs are allowed to take their seats. In addition, the upper house of the UK parliament, the House of Lords, currently has appointed members from Northern Ireland.

The Northern Ireland Office represents the UK Government in Northern Ireland on reserved matters and represents Northern Ireland's interests within the UK Government. Additionally, the Republic's government also has the right to "put forward views and proposals" on non-devolved matters about Northern Ireland. The Northern Ireland Office is led by the Secretary of State for Northern Ireland, who sits in the Cabinet of the United Kingdom.

Northern Ireland is a distinct legal jurisdiction, separate from the two other jurisdictions in the United Kingdom (England and Wales, and Scotland). Northern Ireland law developed from Irish law that existed before the partition of Ireland in 1921. Northern Ireland is a common law jurisdiction and its common law is similar to that in England and Wales. However, there are important differences in law and procedure between Northern Ireland and England and Wales. The body of statute law affecting Northern Ireland reflects the history of Northern Ireland, including Acts of the Parliament of the United Kingdom, the Northern Ireland Assembly, the former Parliament of Northern Ireland, and the Parliament of Ireland, along with some Acts of the Parliament of England and of the Parliament of Great Britain that were extended to Ireland under Poynings' Law between 1494 and 1782.

=== Descriptions ===
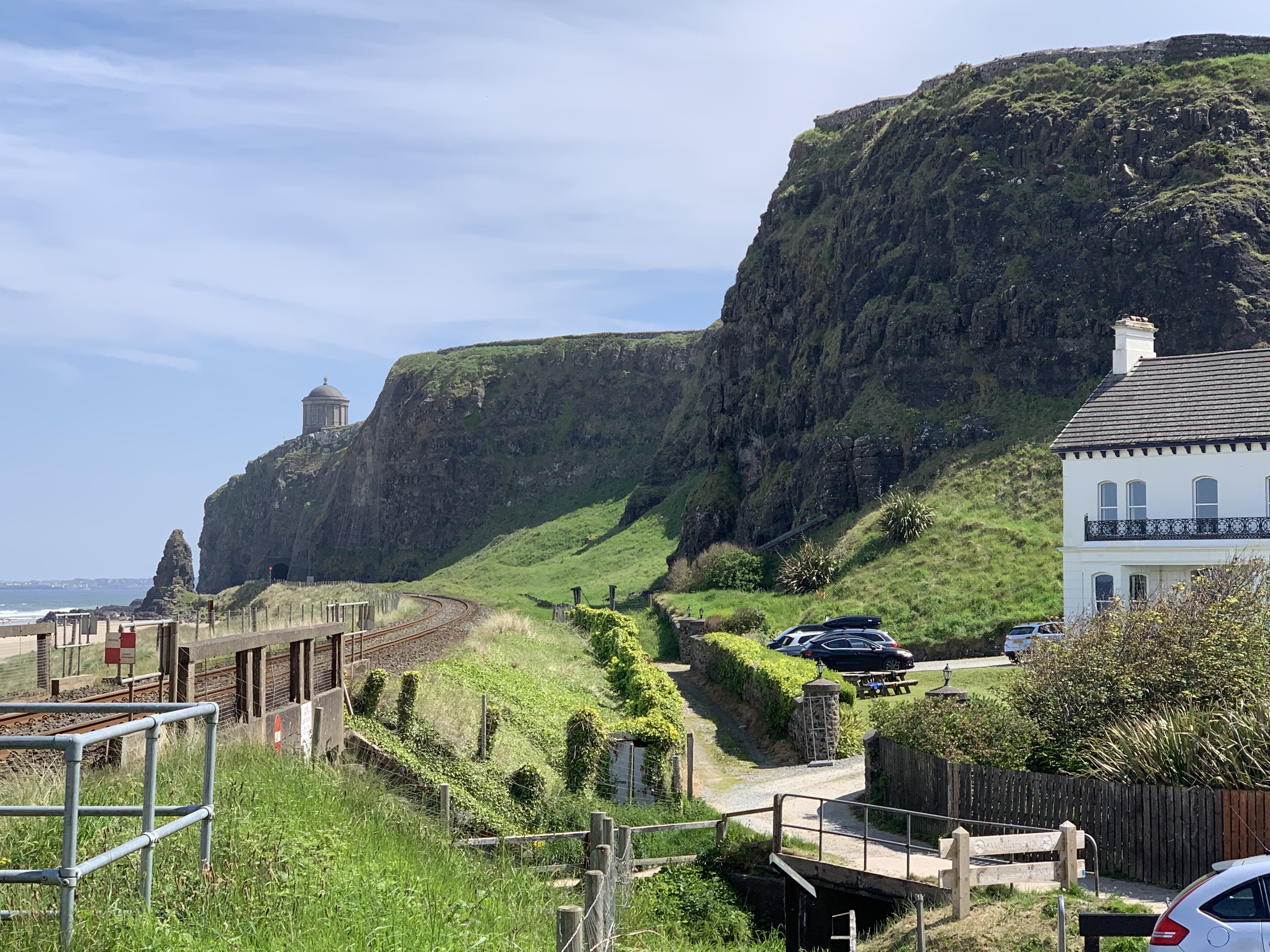
Northern Ireland coast

There is no generally accepted term to describe what Northern Ireland is. It has been described as a country, province, region, and other terms officially, by the press, and in common speech. The choice of term can be controversial and can reveal one's political preferences. This has been noted as a problem by several writers on Northern Ireland, with no generally recommended solution.

ISO 3166-2:GB defines Northern Ireland as a province. The UK's submission to the 2007 United Nations Conference on the Standardization of Geographical Names defines the UK as being made up of two countries (England and Scotland), one principality (Wales) and one province (Northern Ireland). However, this term can be controversial, particularly for nationalists for whom the title province is properly reserved for the traditional province of Ulster, of which Northern Ireland comprises six out of nine counties. Some authors have described the meaning of this term as being equivocal: referring to Northern Ireland as being a province both of the United Kingdom and the traditional country of Ireland.

The UK Office for National Statistics and the website of the Office of the Prime Minister of the United Kingdom describe the United Kingdom as being made up of four countries, one of these being Northern Ireland. Some newspaper style guides also consider country as an acceptable term for Northern Ireland. However, some authors reject the term.

"Region" has also been used by UK government agencies and newspapers. Some authors choose this word but note that it is "unsatisfactory". Northern Ireland can also be simply described as "part of the UK", including by the UK government offices.

=== Alternative names ===
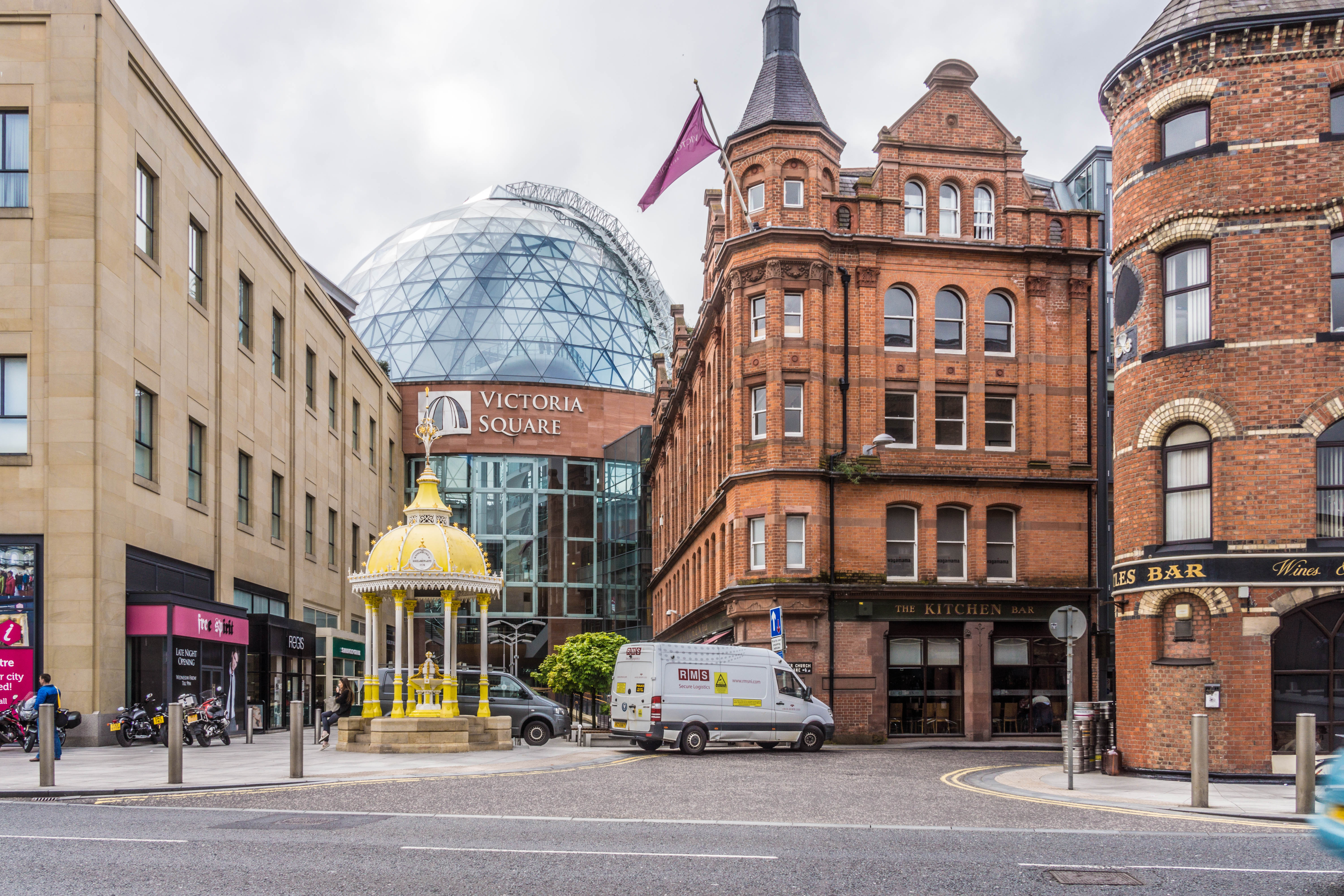
Victoria Square Shopping Centre in Belfast

Many people inside and outside Northern Ireland use other names for Northern Ireland, depending on their point of view. Disagreement on names, and the reading of political symbolism into the use or non-use of a word, also attaches itself to some urban centres. The most notable example is whether Northern Ireland's second-largest city should be called "Derry" or "Londonderry".

Choice of language and nomenclature in Northern Ireland often reveals the cultural, ethnic, and religious identity of the speaker. Those who do not belong to any group but lean towards one side often tend to use the language of that group. Supporters of unionism in the British media (notably The Daily Telegraph and the Daily Express) regularly call Northern Ireland "Ulster". Many media outlets in the Republic use "North of Ireland" (or simply "the North"), as well as the "Six Counties". The New York Times has also used "the North".

Government and cultural organisations in Northern Ireland often use the word "Ulster" in their title; for example, the University of Ulster, the Ulster Museum, the Ulster Orchestra, and BBC Radio Ulster.

Although some news bulletins since the 1990s have opted to avoid all contentious terms and use the official name, Northern Ireland, the term "the North" remains commonly used by broadcast media in the Republic.

==== Unionist ====
- Ulster, strictly speaking, refers to the province of Ulster, of which six of nine historical counties are in Northern Ireland. The term "Ulster" is widely used by unionists and the British press as shorthand for Northern Ireland, and is also favoured by Ulster nationalists. (Note: Examples of usage of this term include Radio Ulster, Ulster Orchestra and RUC; political parties such as the Ulster Unionist Party'; paramilitary organisations including the Ulster Defence Association and Ulster Volunteer Force; and political campaigns such as "Ulster Says No" and "Save Ulster from Sodomy".) In the past, calls have been made for Northern Ireland's name to be changed to Ulster. This proposal was formally considered by the Government of Northern Ireland in 1937 and by the UK Government in 1949 but no change was made.
- The Province refers to the historic Irish province of Ulster but today is used by some as shorthand for Northern Ireland. The BBC, in its editorial guidance for Reporting the United Kingdom, states that "the Province" is an appropriate secondary synonym for Northern Ireland, while "Ulster" is not. It also suggests that "people of Northern Ireland" is preferred to "British" or "Irish", and the term "mainland" should be avoided in reporting about Great Britain and Northern Ireland.

==== Nationalist ====
- North of Ireland – used to avoid using the name given by the British-enacted Government of Ireland Act 1920.
- The Six Counties (na Sé Chontae) – the Republic of Ireland is similarly described as the Twenty-Six Counties. Some of the users of these terms contend that using the official name of the region would imply acceptance of the legitimacy of the Government of Ireland Act.
- The Occupied Six Counties – used by some republicans. The Republic, whose legitimacy is similarly not recognised by republicans opposed to the Belfast Agreement, is described as the "Free State", referring to the Irish Free State, which gained independence (as a Dominion) in 1922.
- British-Occupied Ireland – Similar in tone to the Occupied Six Counties, this term is used by more dogmatic republicans, such as Republican Sinn Féin, who still hold that the Second Dáil was the last legitimate government of Ireland and that all governments since have been foreign-imposed usurpations of Irish national self-determination.

==== Other ====
- Norn Iron or "Norniron" – is an informal and affectionate local nickname used to refer to Northern Ireland, derived from the pronunciation of the words "Northern Ireland" in an exaggerated Belfast accent. The phrase is seen as a lighthearted way to refer to Northern Ireland, based as it is on regional pronunciation. It often refers to the Northern Ireland national football team.

== Geography and climate ==
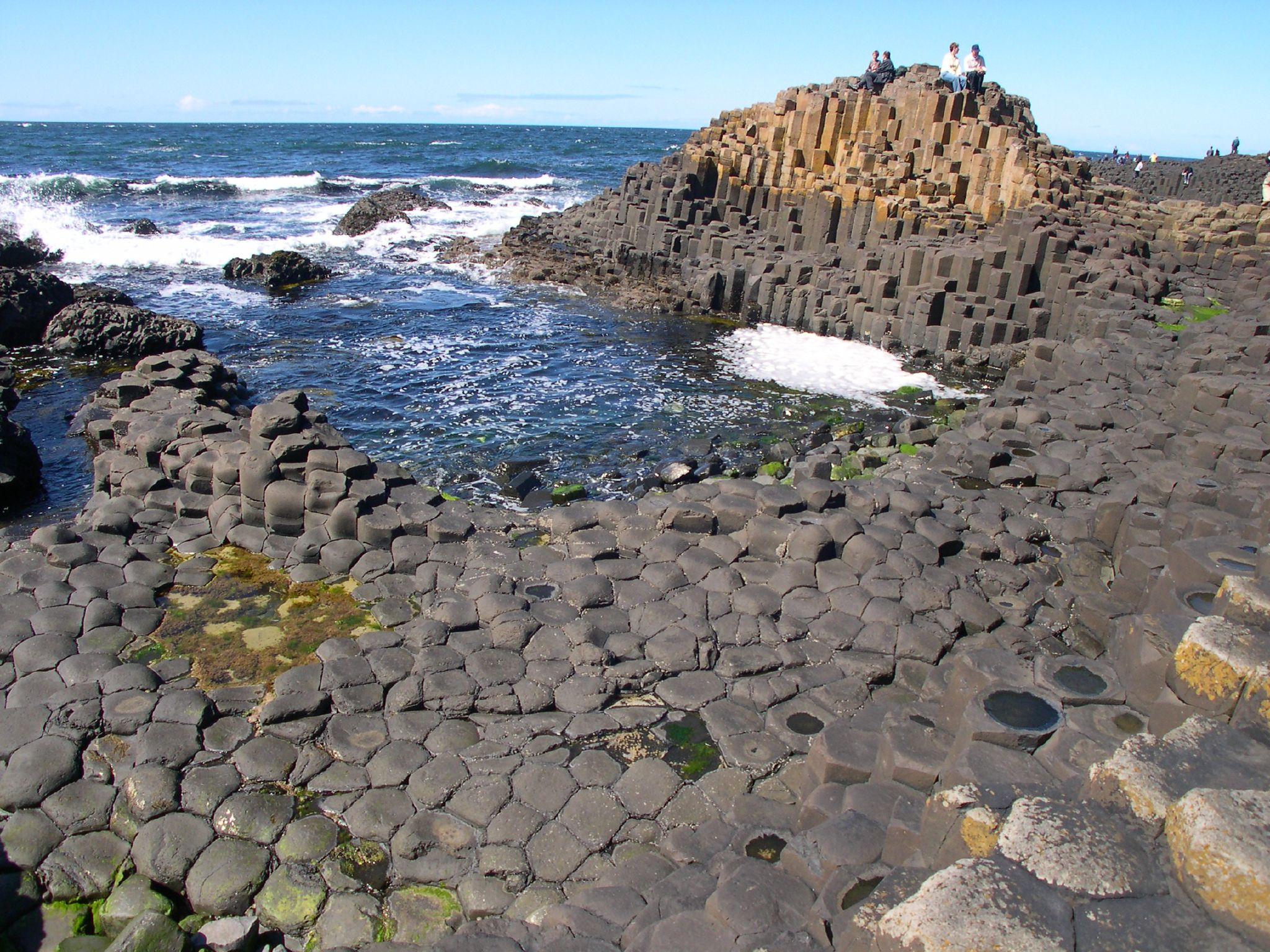
The Giant's Causeway, County Antrim

The volcanic activity which created the Antrim Plateau also formed the geometric pillars of the Giant's Causeway on the north Antrim coast. Also in north Antrim are the Carrick-a-Rede Rope Bridge, Mussenden Temple and the Glens of Antrim. Northern Ireland was covered by an ice sheet for most of the last ice age and on numerous previous occasions, the legacy of which can be seen in the extensive coverage of drumlins in Counties Fermanagh, Armagh, Antrim and particularly Down. The centrepiece of Northern Ireland's geography is Lough Neagh, at 151 square miles (391 km^{2}) the largest freshwater lake both on the island of Ireland and in the British Isles. A second extensive lake system is centred on Lower and Upper Lough Erne in Fermanagh. The largest island of Northern Ireland is Rathlin, off the north Antrim coast. Strangford Lough is the largest inlet in the British Isles, covering 150 km^{2} (58 sq mi).

There are substantial uplands in the Sperrin Mountains (an extension of the Caledonian mountain belt) with extensive gold deposits, the granite Mourne Mountains and the basalt Antrim Plateau, as well as smaller ranges in South Armagh and along the Fermanagh–Tyrone border. None of the hills are especially high, with Slieve Donard in the dramatic Mournes reaching 850 metres (2,789 ft), Northern Ireland's highest point. Belfast's most prominent peak is Cavehill. The Lower and Upper River Bann, River Foyle and River Blackwater form extensive fertile lowlands, with excellent arable land also found in North and East Down, although much of the hill country is marginal and suitable largely for animal husbandry. The valley of the River Lagan is dominated by Belfast, whose metropolitan area includes over a third of the population of Northern Ireland, with heavy urbanisation and industrialisation along the Lagan Valley and both shores of Belfast Lough.

=== Climate ===
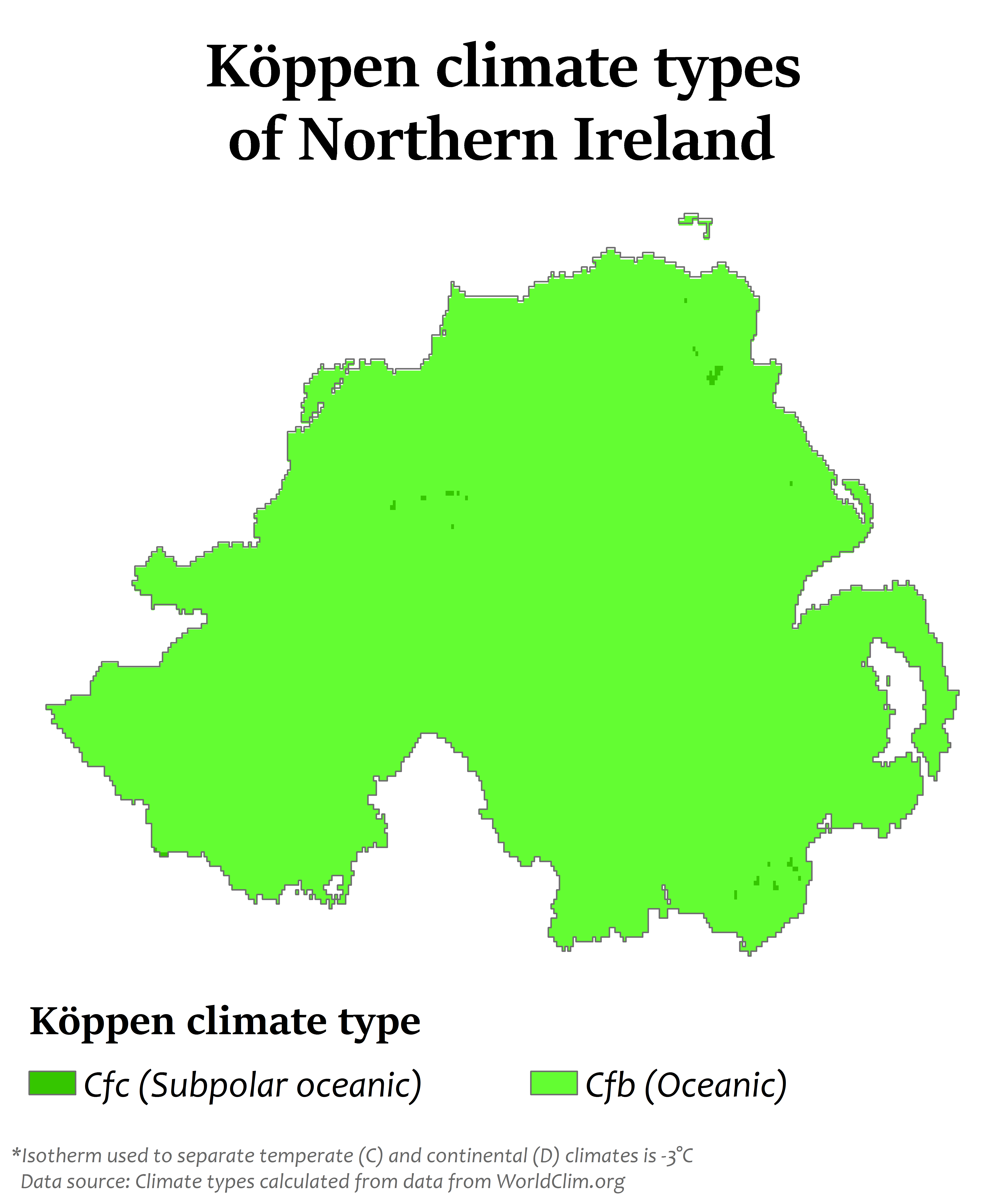
Köppen-Geiger climate classification map of Northern Ireland

The vast majority of Northern Ireland has a temperate maritime climate, (Cfb in the Köppen climate classification) rather wetter in the west than the east, although cloud cover is very common across the region. The weather is unpredictable at all times of the year, and although the seasons are distinct, they are considerably less pronounced than in interior Europe or the eastern seaboard of North America. Average daytime maximums in Belfast are 6.5 °C (43.7 °F) in January and 17.5 °C (63.5 °F) in July. The highest maximum temperature recorded was 31.4 °C (88.5 °F), registered in July 2021 at Armagh Observatory's weather station. The lowest minimum temperature recorded was −18.7 °C (−1.7 °F) at Castlederg, County Tyrone on 23 December 2010.

=== Flora and fauna ===
Until the end of the Middle Ages, the land was heavily forested. Native species include deciduous trees such as oak, ash, hazel, birch, alder, willow, aspen, elm, rowan and hawthorn, as well as evergreen trees such Scots pine, yew and holly. Today, only 8% of Northern Ireland is woodland, and most of this is non-native conifer plantations.

As of the 21st century, Northern Ireland is the least forested part of the United Kingdom and Ireland, and one of the least forested countries in Europe.

The only native reptile in Northern Ireland is the viviparous lizard, or common lizard, which is widely distributed, particularly in heaths, bogs and sand dunes. The common frog is a very widespread species. Some lakes support internationally important bird populations, Lough Neagh and Lough Beg hold up to 80,000 wintering waterfowl of some 20 species, including ducks, geese, swans and gulls. The otter is the fourth largest land mammal in Northern Ireland. It can be found along the river systems, although it is seldom seen and will avoid contact with humans. 356 species of marine algae have been recorded in the northeast of Ireland; 77 species are considered rare.

== Economy ==
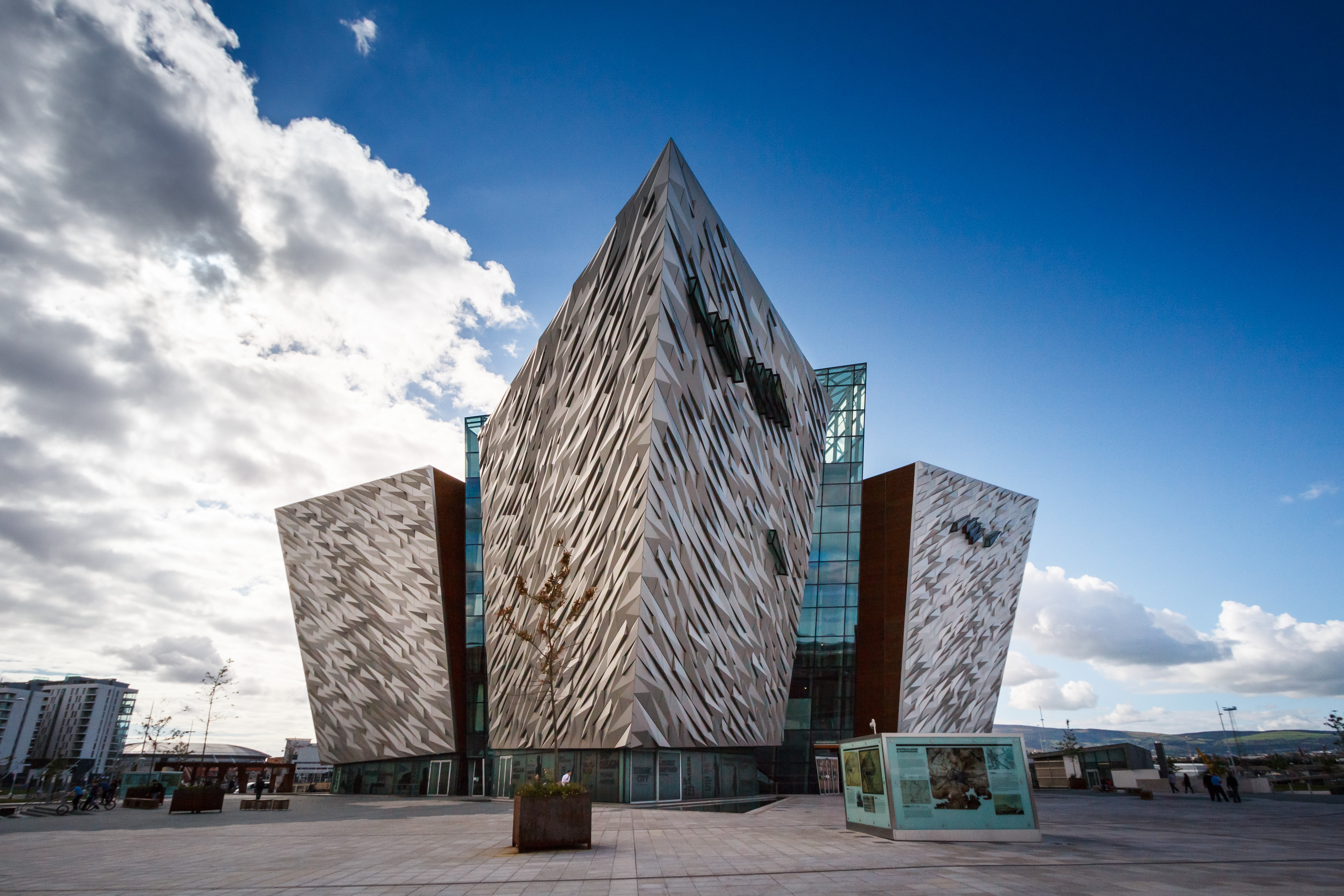
Titanic Belfast, in the Titanic Quarter

Northern Ireland traditionally had an industrial economy, most notably featuring shipbuilding, rope manufacture, and textiles. In 2019, 53% of GVA was generated by services, 22% by the public sector, 15% by production, 8% by construction and 2% by agriculture.

In the coal industry, John Kelly Limited was the largest coal firm in Northern Ireland, spanning 150 years. It started in Queen's Quay, Belfast, by Samuel Kelly as a coal commissions and grocer. After his death, son John Kelly took over and expanded the fleet of coasters. The business saw the most growth under John Kelly's son, Sir Samuel Kelly, who incorporated the business as a limited company in 1911. John Kelly Limited expanded along the docks, likewise with their offices, expansion to Ballymena and Carrickfergus took place, and coal boats would travel to Larne Harbour. The company was renamed to Kelly's Fuels in the 1990s, and quickly became one of the biggest oil distributors in the Northern Ireland.

Belfast is the United Kingdom's second largest tech hub outside of London with more than 25% of their jobs being technology related. Many established multinational tech companies such as Fujitsu, SAP, IBM and Microsoft have a presence here. It is regarded an appealing place to live for tech professionals and has a low cost of living compared to other cities.

In 2019 Northern Ireland welcomed 5.3m visitors, who spent over £1billion. A total of 167 cruise ships docked at Northern Ireland ports in 2019. Tourism in recent years has been a major growth area with key attractions including the Giants Causeway and the many castles in the region with the historic towns and cities of Belfast, Derry, Armagh and Enniskillen being popular with tourists. Entertainment venues include the SSE Arena, Waterfront Hall, the Grand Opera House and Custom House Square. Tourists use various means of transport around Northern Ireland such as vehicle hire, guided tours, taxi tours, electric bikes, electric cars and public transport.

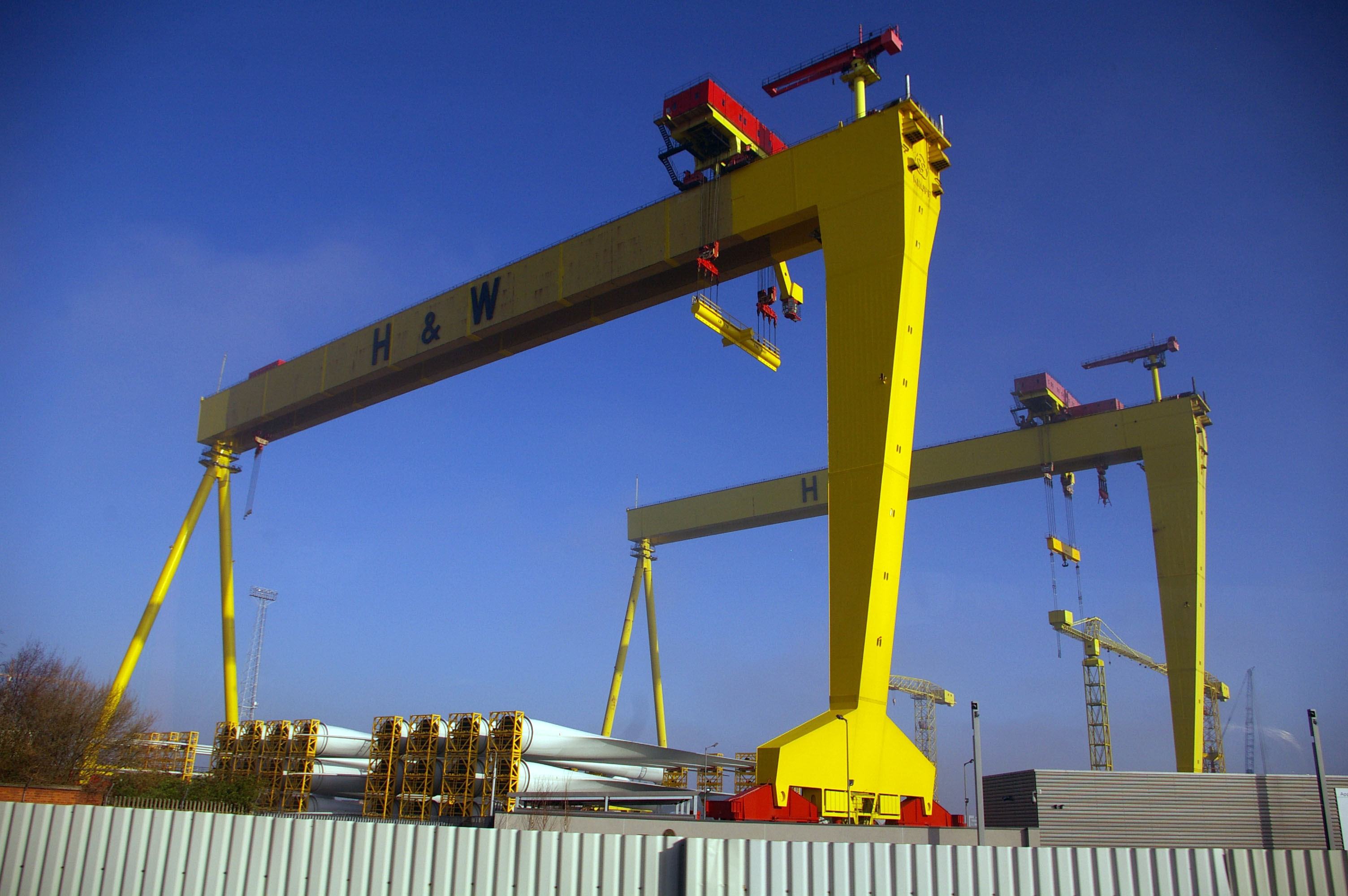
Harland & Wolff shipyard cranes named Samson and Goliath

Belfast currently has an 81-acre shipyard which was purposely developed to be able to take some of the world's largest vessels. It has the largest dry dock for ships in Europe measuring 556m x 93m and has 106m high cranes, it is ideally situated between the Atlantic Ocean and the North Sea. The shipyard can build ships and complete maintenance contracts such as the contracts awarded by P&O and Cunard cruise ships in 2022.

Northern Ireland feeds around 10 million people when their population is only 1.8 million. The predominant activity on Northern Ireland farms in 2022 was cattle and sheep. 79 per cent of farms in Northern Ireland have some cattle, 38 per cent have some sheep. Over three-quarters of farms in Northern Ireland are very small, in 2022 there were 26,089 farms in Northern Ireland with approximately one million hectares of land farmed. Northern Ireland is in a unique position where it can sell goods to the rest of the United Kingdom and the European Union tariff-free, free from customs declarations, rules of origin certificates and non-tariff barriers on the sale of goods to both regions.

Below is a comparison of the goods being sold and purchased between Northern Ireland and the United Kingdom, compared with the goods being exported and imported between Northern Ireland and the Republic of Ireland:

Northern Ireland Sales/Exports
	United Kingdom	Republic of Ireland
2020	£11.3 billion	£4.2 billion
2021	£12.8 billion	£5.2 billion

Northern Ireland Purchases/Imports
	United Kingdom	Republic of Ireland
2020	£13.4 billion	£2.5 billion
2021	£14.4 billion	£3.1 billion

=== Infrastructure and transportation ===
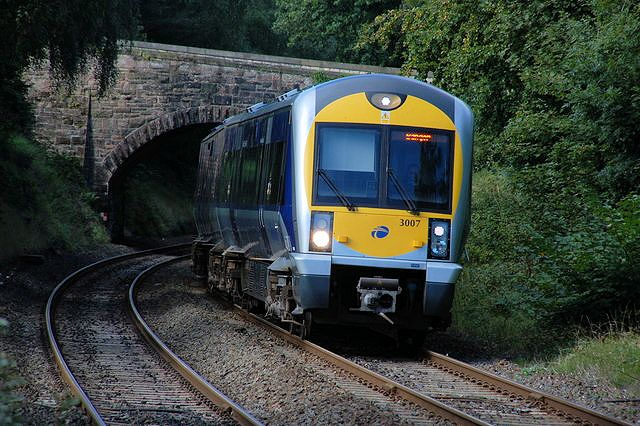
An NIR C3K railcar

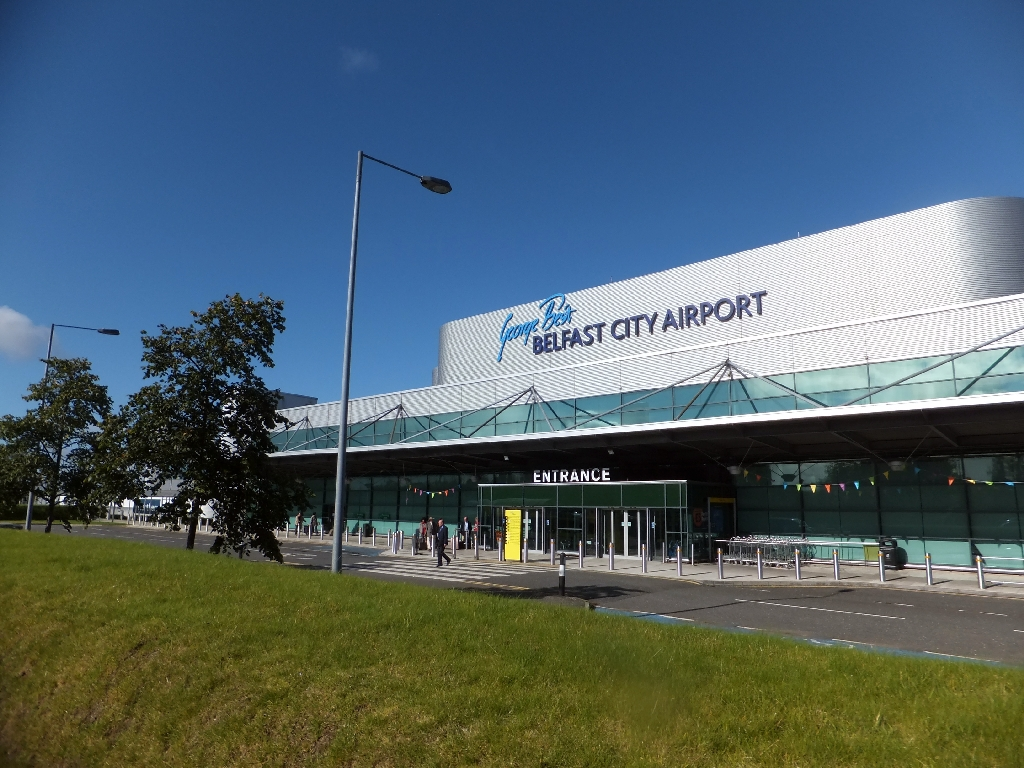
The terminal building of Belfast City Airport

Northern Ireland has underdeveloped transport infrastructure, with most infrastructure concentrated around Greater Belfast, Greater Derry, and Craigavon. Northern Ireland is served by three airports—Belfast International near Antrim, George Best Belfast City integrated into the railway network at Sydenham in East Belfast, and City of Derry in County Londonderry. There are upgrade plans to transform the railway network in Northern Ireland including new lines from Derry to Portadown and Belfast to Newry, though it will take the best part of 25 years to deliver. There are major seaports at Larne and Belfast which carry passengers and freight between Great Britain and Northern Ireland.

Passenger railways are operated by NI Railways. With Iarnród Éireann (Irish Rail), NI Railways co-operates in providing the joint Enterprise service between Dublin Connolly and Belfast Grand Central. The whole of Ireland has a mainline railway network with a gauge of 5 ft 3 in (1,600 mm), which is unique in Europe and has resulted in distinct rolling stock designs. The only preserved line of this gauge on the island is the Downpatrick and County Down Railway, which operates heritage steam and diesel locomotives. Main railway lines linking to and from Belfast Grand Central Station and Lanyon Place railway station are:

- The Derry Line and the Portrush Branch.
- The Larne Line
- The Bangor Line
- The Newry/Portadown Line

The Derry line is the busiest single-track railway line in the United Kingdom, carrying 3 million passengers per annum, the Derry-Londonderry Line has also been described by Michael Palin as "one of the most beautiful rail journeys in the world".

Main motorways are:

- M1 connecting Belfast to the south and west, ending in Dungannon
- M2 connecting Belfast to the north. An unconnected section of the M2 also by-passes Ballymena

Additional short motorway spurs include:

- M12 connecting the M1 to Portadown
- M22 connecting the M2 to near Randalstown
- M3 connecting the M1 (via the A12) and M2 in Belfast with the A2 dual carriageway to Bangor
- M5 connecting Belfast to Newtownabbey

The cross-border road connecting the ports of Larne in Northern Ireland and Rosslare Harbour in the Republic of Ireland is being upgraded as part of an EU-funded scheme. European route E01 runs from Larne through the island of Ireland, Spain, and Portugal to Seville.

== Demographics ==
=== Counties ===
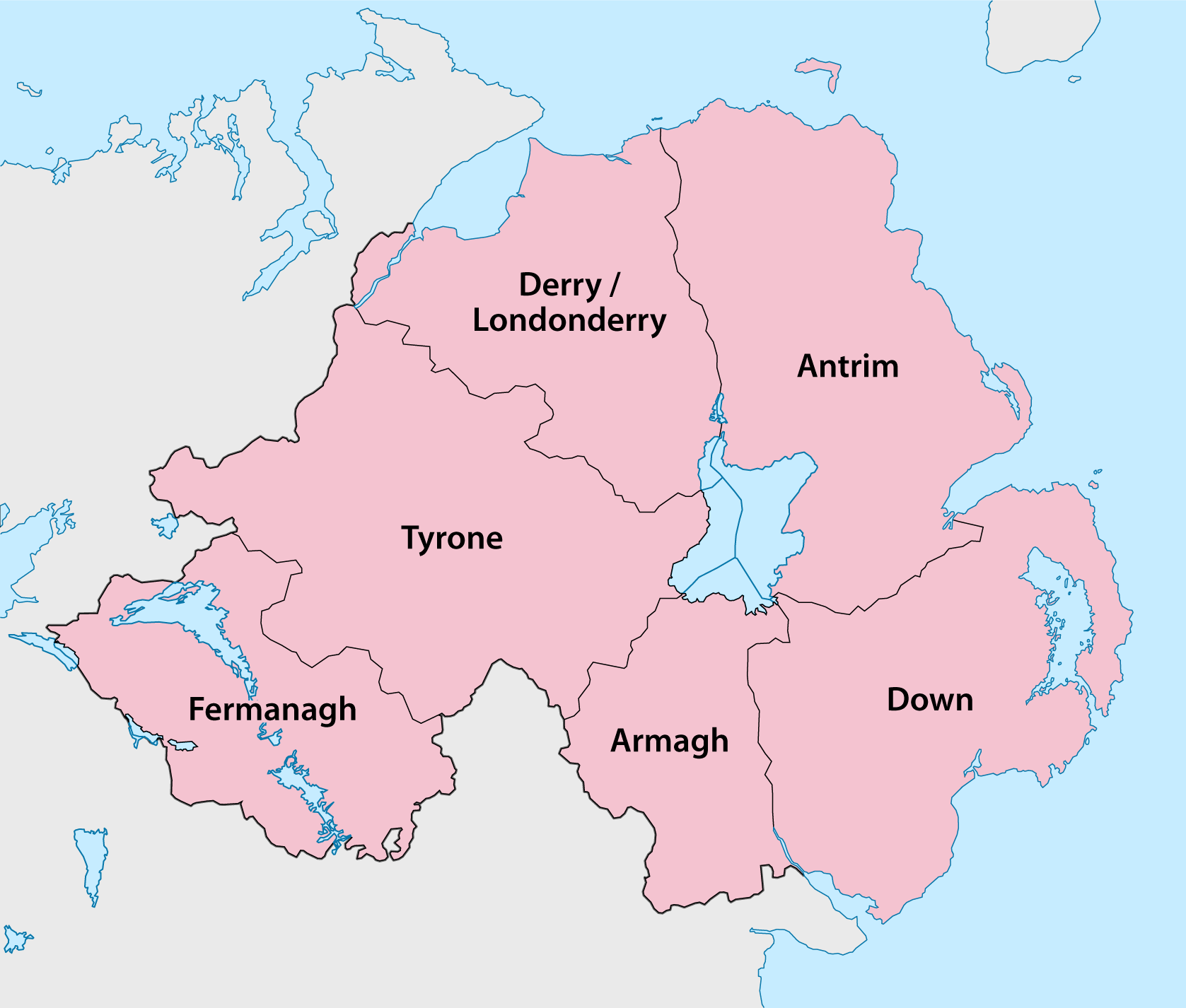
The six counties of Northern Ireland

Northern Ireland consists of six historic counties: County Antrim, County Armagh, County Down, County Fermanagh, County Londonderry, (Note: Many Nationalists use the name County Derry.) and County Tyrone.

These counties are no longer used for local government purposes; instead, there are eleven districts of Northern Ireland which have different geographical extents. These were created in 2015, replacing the twenty-six districts which previously existed.

Although counties are no longer used for local governmental purposes, they remain a popular means of describing where places are. They are officially used while applying for an Irish passport, which requires one to state one's county of birth. The name of that county then appears in both Irish and English on the passport's information page, as opposed to the town or city of birth on the United Kingdom passport. The Gaelic Athletic Association still uses the counties as its primary means of organisation and fields representative teams of each GAA county. The original system of car registration numbers largely based on counties remains in use. In 2000, the telephone numbering system was restructured into an 8-digit scheme with (except for Belfast) the first digit approximately reflecting the county.

The county boundaries still appear on Ordnance Survey of Northern Ireland Maps and the Philip's Street Atlases, among others. With their decline in official use, there is often confusion surrounding towns and cities which lie near county boundaries, such as Belfast and Lisburn, which are split between counties Down and Antrim (the majorities of both cities, however, are in Antrim).

In March 2018, The Sunday Times published its list of Best Places to Live in Britain, including the following places in Northern Ireland: Ballyhackamore near Belfast (overall best for Northern Ireland); Holywood, County Down; Newcastle, County Down; Portrush, County Antrim; Strangford, County Down.

=== Cities and major towns ===
According to the 2021 census, just over 50% of Northern Ireland's population lives in the highlighted red and yellow area. This area is concentrated around Belfast and nearby settlements (red), and features the greatest concentration of motorways, dual carriageways, railways and train stations (overlaid).

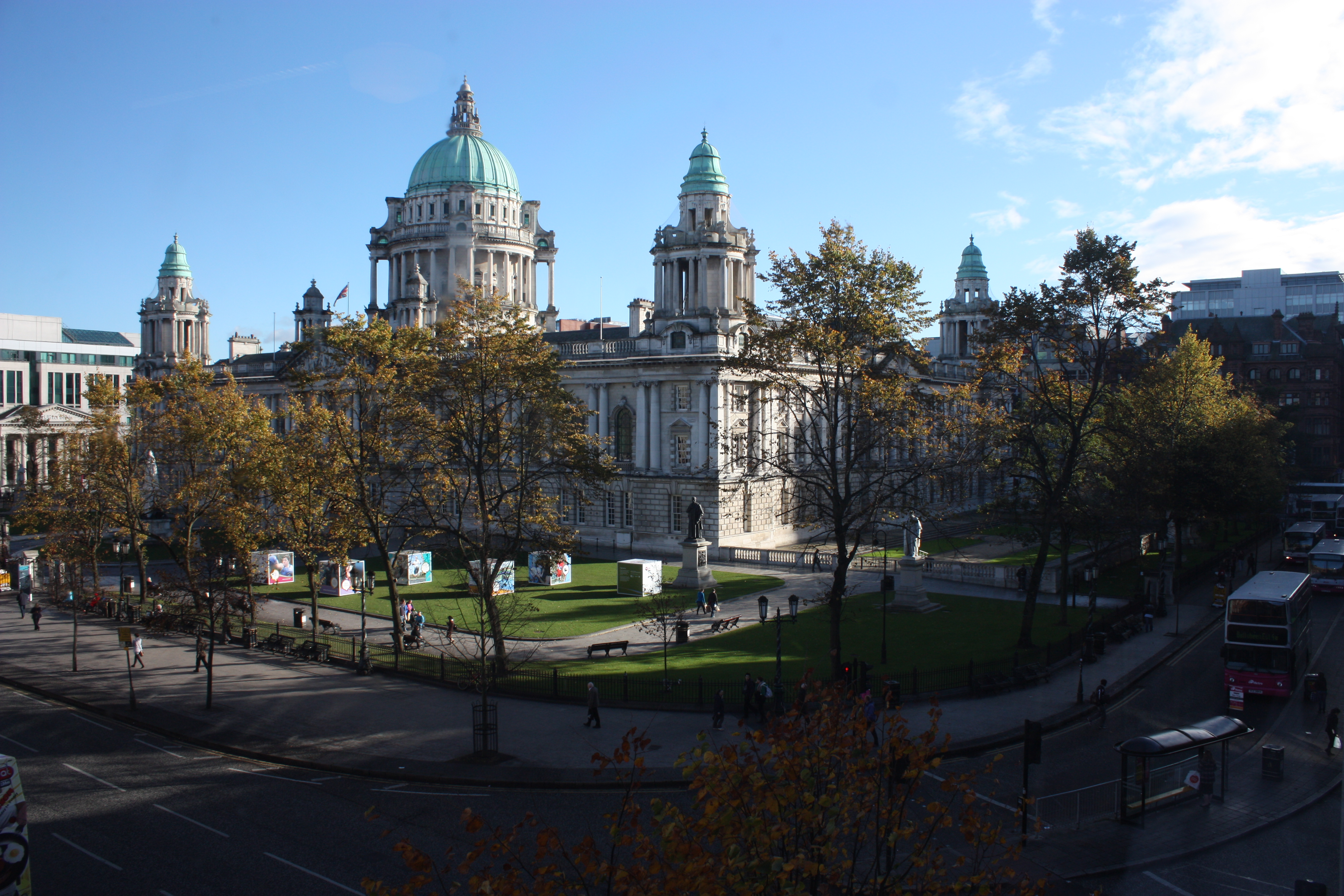
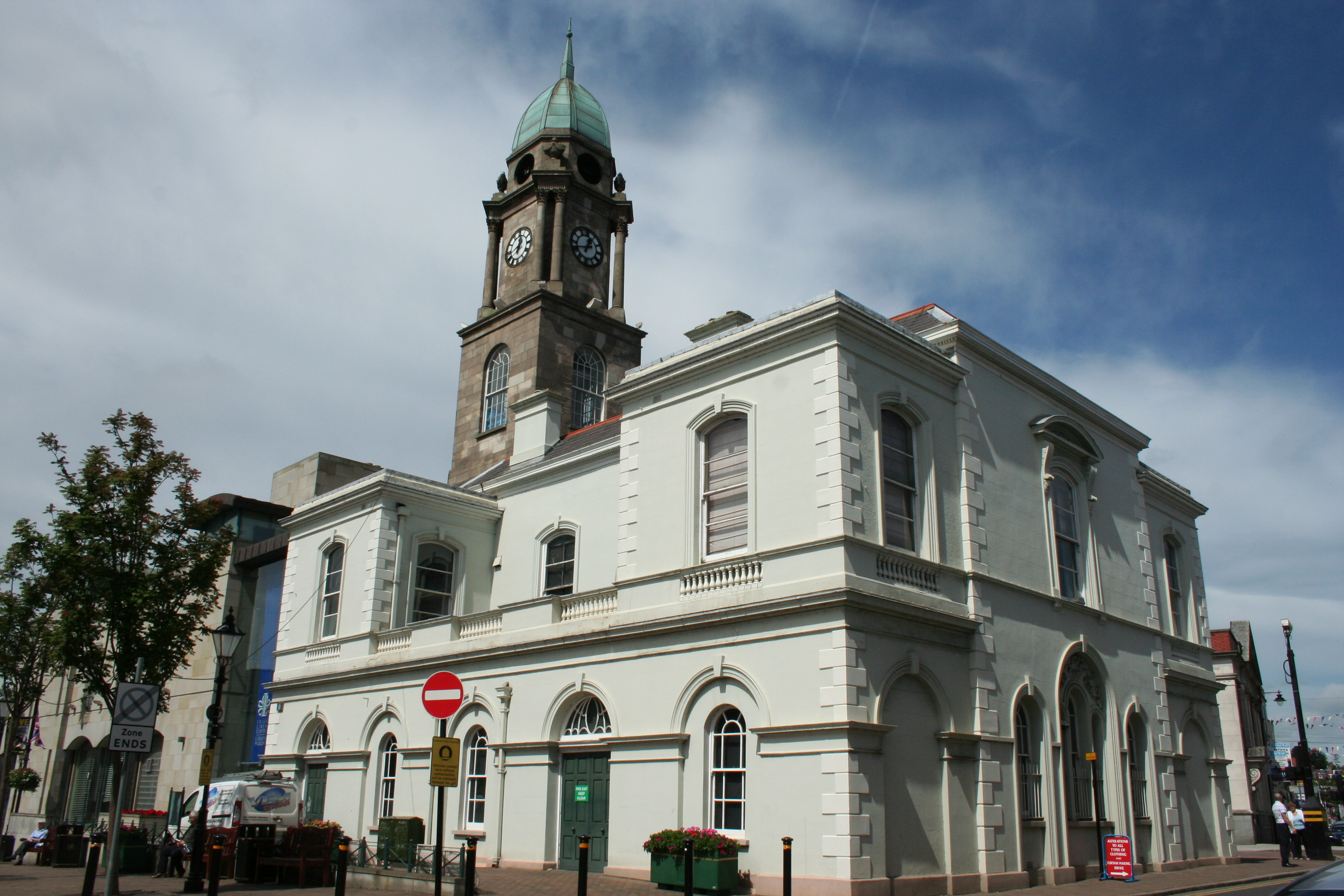
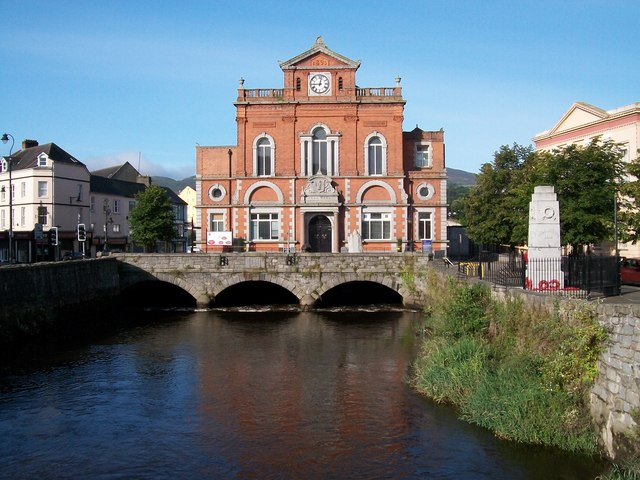
Cities and towns by population
Belfast Derry	#	Settlement	Population (2021)	Metro population	Lisburn Newry
Belfast Derry	1	Belfast	293,298	639,000	Lisburn Newry
Belfast Derry	2	Derry	85,279		Lisburn Newry
Belfast Derry	3	Greater Craigavon	72,301		Lisburn Newry
Belfast Derry	4	Newtownabbey (Note: Part of Belfast metropolitan area)	67,599		Lisburn Newry
Belfast Derry	5	Bangor	64,596		Lisburn Newry
Belfast Derry	6	Lisburn	51,447	84,090	Lisburn Newry
Belfast Derry	7	Ballymena	31,205		Lisburn Newry
Belfast Derry	8	Newtownards	29,677		Lisburn Newry
Belfast Derry	9	Newry	28,530		Lisburn Newry
Belfast Derry	10	Carrickfergus	28,141		Lisburn Newry

=== Population ===
2011 census: differences in proportions of those who are, or were brought up, either Catholic or Protestant/Other Christians

The population of Northern Ireland has risen yearly since 1978. The population at the time of the 2021 census was 1.9 million, having grown 5% over the previous decade. The population in 2011 was 1.8 million, a rise of 7.5% over the previous decade. The current population makes up 2.8% of the UK's population (67 million) and 27% of the island of Ireland's population (7.03 million). The population density is 135 inhabitants / km^{2}.

Northern Ireland is much less ethnically diverse than the rest of the UK. As of the 2021 census, the population of Northern Ireland is almost entirely white (96.6%). 3.4% of the population (65,600 people) in 2025 were from a minority ethnic group compared to 18.3% in England and Wales and 12.9% in Scotland. In 2021, 86.5% of the population were born in Northern Ireland, with 4.8% born in Great Britain, 2.1% born in the Republic of Ireland, and 6.5% born elsewhere (more than half of them in another European country). In 2021 the largest non-white ethnic groups were black (0.6%), Indian (0.5%), and Chinese (0.5%). In 2011, 88.8% of the population were born in Northern Ireland, 4.5% in Great Britain, and 2.9% in the Republic of Ireland. 4.3% were born elsewhere; triple the amount there were in 2001.

As of the 2021 Census 1,165,168 (61.2%) residents lived in an urban environment and 738,007 (38.8%) lived in a non-urban environment.

=== Identity and citizenship ===
National Identity of Northern Ireland residents (2021)
Nationality	Per cent
British	42.8%
Irish	33.3%
Northern Irish	31.5%

In Northern Ireland censuses, respondents can choose more than one national identity. In 2021:

- 42.8% identified as British, solely or along with other national identities
- 33.3% identified as Irish, solely or along with other national identities
- 31.5% identified as Northern Irish, solely or along with other national identities

The main national identities given in recent censuses were:

National identity of Northern Ireland residents
Identity	2011	2021			
Identity	2011	2021	British only	39.9%	31.9%
Irish only	25.3%	29.1%			
Northern Irish only	20.9%	19.8%			
British & Northern Irish	6.2%	8.0%			
Irish & Northern Irish	1.1%	1.8%			
British, Irish & Northern Irish	1.0%	1.5%			
British & Irish	0.7%	0.6%			
English, Scottish, or Welsh	1.6%	1.5%			
All other	3.4%	6.0%			

As of the 2021 census, regarding national identity, four of the six traditional counties had an Irish plurality and two had a British plurality.

National identity of Northern Ireland residents by county
National Identity	Antrim	Armagh	Down	Fermanagh	Londonderry	Tyrone							
National Identity	Antrim	Armagh	Down	Fermanagh	Londonderry	Tyrone	Irish only	25.7%	39.0%	18.5%	38.3%	42.2%	41.6%
All Irish identities	29.7%	42.2%	23.7%	41.9%	46.0%	44.9%							
British only	35.5%	24.7%	37.7%	26.2%	24.8%	21.0%							
All British identities	47.4%	32.3%	52.5%	32.9%	32.2%	27.0%							
Northern Irish only	18.7%	16.8%	21.7%	21.3%	19.7%	20.5%							
All Northern Irish identities	31.1%	25.4%	36.9%	29.1%	28.3%	28.0%							

=== Religion ===
At the 2021 census, 42.3% of the population identified as Roman Catholic, 37.3% as Protestant/other Christian, 1.3% as other religions, while 17.4% identified with no religion or did not state one. The biggest of the Protestant/other Christian denominations were the Presbyterian Church (16.6%), the Church of Ireland (11.5%) and the Methodist Church (2.3%). The 2021 Census found that for the first time in 160 years the Catholic proportion of the population was higher than it had been at the time of the 1861 Census. At the 2011 census, 41.5% of the population identified as Protestant/other Christian, 41% as Roman Catholic, 0.8% as other religions, while 17% identified with no religion or did not state one. In terms of background (i.e. religion or religion brought up in), at the 2021 census 45.7% of the population came from a Catholic background, 43.5% from a Protestant background, 1.5% from other religious backgrounds, and 5.6% from non-religious backgrounds. This was the first time since Northern Ireland's creation that there were more people from a Catholic background than Protestant. At the 2011 census, 48% came from a Protestant background, 45% from a Catholic background, 0.9% from other religious backgrounds, and 5.6% from non-religious backgrounds.

Religion in Northern Ireland – 2021 survey by NISRA
Religion	Per cent
Roman Catholic	42.3%
Protestant/other Christian	37.3%
No religion/Not stated	17.4%
Other religions	1.3%

In recent censuses, respondents gave their religious identity or religious upbringing as follows:

Religion or religious background of Northern Ireland residents
Religion / religion of upbringing	2001	2011	2021				
Religion / religion of upbringing	2001	2011	2021	Catholic	43.8%	45.1%	45.7%
Protestant and other Christian	53.1%	48.4%	43.5%				
Other religions	0.4%	0.9%	1.5%				
No religion nor religious upbringing	2.7%	5.6%	9.3%				

As of the 2021 census, regarding religious background, four of the six traditional counties had a Catholic majority, one had a Protestant plurality, and one had a Protestant majority.

Religion or religious background of Northern Ireland residents by county
Religion / religion of upbringing	Antrim	Armagh	Down	Fermanagh	Londonderry	Tyrone							
Religion / religion of upbringing	Antrim	Armagh	Down	Fermanagh	Londonderry	Tyrone	Catholic	40.1%	58.2%	32.3%	58.8%	61.3%	66.5%
Protestant and other Christian	47.0%	34.0%	53.5%	35.5%	32.5%	28.9%							
Other religions	2.1%	1.2%	1.5%	1.1%	0.9%	0.6%							
No religion nor religious upbringing	10.8%	6.7%	12.7%	4.6%	5.3%	4.0%							

Several studies and surveys carried out between 1971 and 2006 have indicated that, in general, most Protestants in Northern Ireland see themselves primarily as British, whereas most Catholics see themselves primarily as Irish. This does not, however, account for the complex identities within Northern Ireland, given that many of the population regard themselves as "Ulster" or "Northern Irish", either as a primary or secondary identity.

A 2008 survey found that 57% of Protestants described themselves as British, while 32% identified as Northern Irish, 6% as Ulster, and 4% as Irish. Compared to a similar survey in 1998, this shows a fall in the percentage of Protestants identifying as British and Ulster and a rise in those identifying as Northern Irish. The 2008 survey found that 61% of Catholics described themselves as Irish, with 25% identifying as Northern Irish, 8% as British, and 1% as Ulster. These figures were largely unchanged from the 1998 results. Northern Ireland has had a small Jewish community since the mid-19th century, when Jewish merchants involved in the linen trade settled in Belfast, forming part of the city’s social and cultural life. The city’s first synagogue opened in 1872, and by the 2020s the Belfast Hebrew Congregation remained Northern Ireland’s only active synagogue, serving a community in which 439 residents identified their religion as Jewish in the 2021 census.

People born in Northern Ireland are, with some exceptions, deemed by UK law to be citizens of the United Kingdom. They are also, with similar exceptions, entitled to be citizens of Ireland. This entitlement was reaffirmed in the 1998 Good Friday Agreement between the British and Irish governments, which provides that:

...it is the birthright of all the people of Northern Ireland to identify themselves and be accepted as Irish or British, or both, as they may so choose, and accordingly [the two governments] confirm that their right to hold both British and Irish citizenship is accepted by both Governments and would not be affected by any future change in the status of Northern Ireland.

2011: Map of most commonly held passport

As a result of the Agreement, the Constitution of the Republic of Ireland was amended. The current wording provides that people born in Northern Ireland are entitled to be Irish citizens on the same basis as people from any other part of the island.

Neither government, however, extends its citizenship to all persons born in Northern Ireland. Both governments exclude some people born in Northern Ireland, in particular persons born without one parent who is a British or Irish citizen. The Irish restriction was given effect by the twenty-seventh amendment to the Irish Constitution in 2004. The position in UK nationality law is that most of those born in Northern Ireland are UK nationals, whether or not they so choose. Renunciation of British citizenship requires the payment of a fee, currently £372.

In recent censuses, residents said they held the following passports:

Passports held by Northern Ireland residents
Passport	2011	2021			
Passport	2011	2021	United Kingdom	59.1%	52.6%
Ireland	20.8%	32.3%			
European countries	2.2%	3.9%			
Other countries in world	1.1%	1.6%			
No passport	18.9%	15.9%			

=== Languages ===
Irish is an official language of Northern Ireland as of 6 December 2022 when the Irish Language Act (Identity and Language (Northern Ireland) Act 2022) became law. The Irish Language Act officially repealed legislation from 1737 that banned the use of Irish in courts. English is a de facto official language. English is spoken as a first language by 95.4% of the Northern Ireland population.

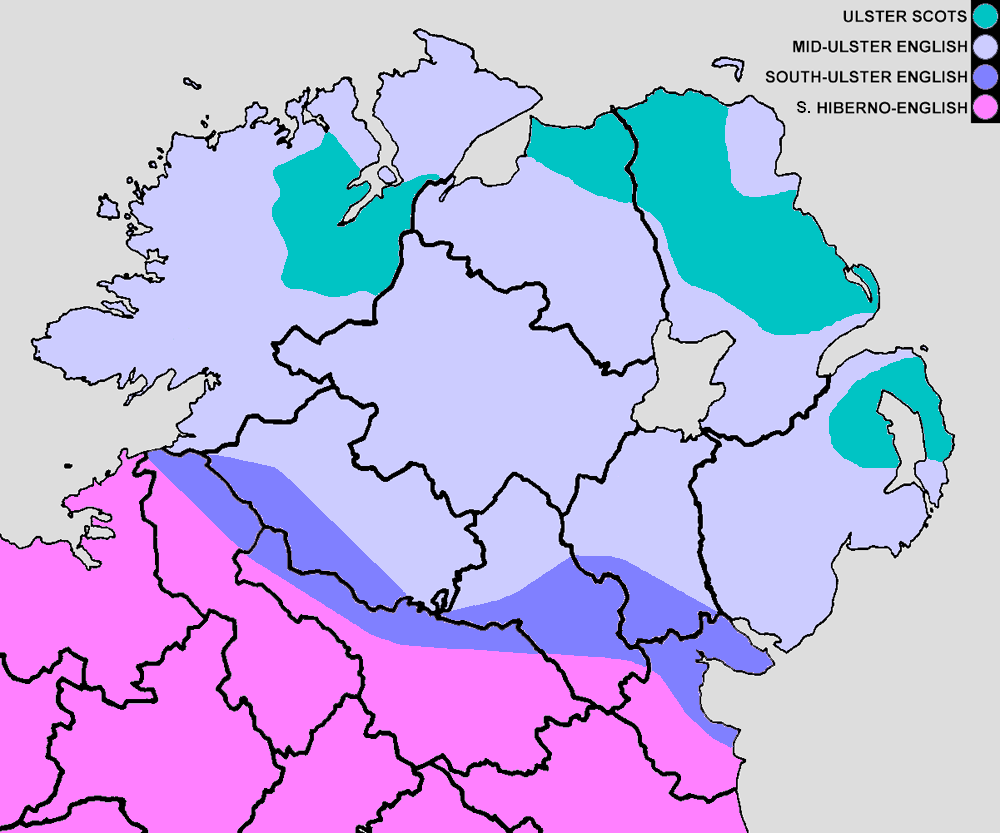
Approximate boundaries of the current and historical English/Scots dialects in Ulster. South to north, the colour bands represent Hiberno-English, South-Ulster English, Mid-Ulster English, and the three traditional Ulster Scots areas. The Irish-speaking Gaeltacht is not shown.

Under the Good Friday Agreement, Irish and Ulster Scots (an Ulster dialect of the Scots language, sometimes known as Ullans), are recognised as "part of the cultural wealth of Northern Ireland". The Irish Language Act of 2022 also legislated commissioners for both Irish and Ulster Scots.

Two all-island bodies for the promotion of these were created under the Agreement: Foras na Gaeilge, which promotes the Irish language, and the Ulster Scots Agency, which promotes the Ulster-Scots dialect and culture. These operate separately under the aegis of the North/South Language Body, which reports to the North/South Ministerial Council.

The UK Government in 2001 ratified the European Charter for Regional or Minority Languages. Irish (in Northern Ireland) was specified under Part III of the Charter, with a range of specific undertakings about education, translation of statutes, interaction with public authorities, the use of placenames, media access, support for cultural activities, and other matters. A lower level of recognition was accorded to Ulster-Scots, under Part II of the Charter.

==== English ====
According to the 2021 census, in 94.74% of households, all people aged 16 and above spoke English as their main language. The dialect of English spoken in Northern Ireland shows influence from the lowland Scots language. There are supposedly some minute differences in pronunciation between Protestants and Catholics, for instance; the name of the letter h, which Protestants tend to pronounce as "aitch", as in British English, and Catholics tend to pronounce as "haitch", as in Hiberno-English. However, geography is a much more important determinant of dialect than religious background.

==== Irish ====
Percentage of people aged 3+ claiming to have some ability in Irish in the 2011 census

The Irish language (Irish: an Ghaeilge), or Gaelic, is the second most spoken language in Northern Ireland and is a native language of Ireland. It was spoken predominantly throughout what is now Northern Ireland before the Ulster Plantations in the 17th century and most place names in Northern Ireland are anglicised versions of a Gaelic name. Today, the language is often associated with Irish nationalism (and thus with Catholics). However, in the 19th century, the language was seen as a common heritage, with Ulster Protestants playing a leading role in the Gaelic revival.

In the 2021 census, 12.4% (compared with 10.7% in 2011) of the population of Northern Ireland claimed "some knowledge of Irish" and 3.9% (compared with 3.7% in 2011) reported being able to "speak, read, write and understand" Irish. In another survey, from 1999, 1% of respondents said they spoke it as their main language at home.

The dialect spoken in Northern Ireland, Ulster Irish, has two main types, East Ulster Irish and Donegal Irish (or West Ulster Irish), is the one closest to Scottish Gaelic (which developed into a separate language from Irish Gaelic in the 17th century). Some words and phrases are shared with Scots Gaelic, and the dialects of east Ulster – those of Rathlin Island and the Glens of Antrim – were very similar to the dialect of Argyll, the part of Scotland nearest to Ireland. The dialects of Armagh and Down were also very similar to the dialects of Galloway.

The use of the Irish language in Northern Ireland today is politically sensitive. The erection by some district councils of bilingual street names in both English and Irish, invariably in predominantly nationalist districts, is resisted by unionists who claim that it creates a "chill factor" and thus harms community relationships. Efforts by members of the Northern Ireland Assembly to legislate for some official uses of the language have failed to achieve the required cross-community support. In May 2022, the UK Government proposed a bill in the House of Lords to make Irish an official language (and support Ulster Scots) in Northern Ireland and to create an Irish Language Commissioner. The bill has since been passed, and received royal assent in December 2022. There has recently been an increase in interest in the language among unionists in East Belfast.

==== Ulster Scots ====
Percentage of people aged 3+ claiming to have some ability in Ulster Scots in the 2011 census

Ulster Scots comprises varieties of the Scots language spoken in Northern Ireland. For a native English speaker, "[Ulster Scots] is comparatively accessible, and even at its most intense can be understood fairly easily with the help of a glossary."

Along with the Irish language, the Good Friday Agreement recognised the dialect as part of Northern Ireland's unique culture and the St Andrews Agreement recognised the need to "enhance and develop the Ulster Scots language, heritage and culture".

At the time of the 2021 census, approximately 1.1% (compared to 0.9% in 2011) of the population claimed to be able to speak, read, write and understand Ulster-Scots, while 10.4% (compared to 8.1% in 2011) professed to have "some ability".

==== Sign languages ====
The most common sign language in Northern Ireland is Northern Ireland Sign Language (NISL). However, because in the past Catholic families tended to send their deaf children to schools in Dublin where Irish Sign Language (ISL) is commonly used, ISL is still common among many older deaf people from Catholic families.

Irish Sign Language (ISL) has some influence from the French family of sign language, which includes American Sign Language (ASL). NISL takes a large component from the British family of sign language (which also includes Auslan) with many borrowings from ASL. It is described as being related to Irish Sign Language at the syntactic level while much of the lexicon is based on British Sign Language (BSL).

As of March 2004 the UK Government recognises only British Sign Language and Irish Sign Language as the official sign languages used in Northern Ireland.

=== Education ===
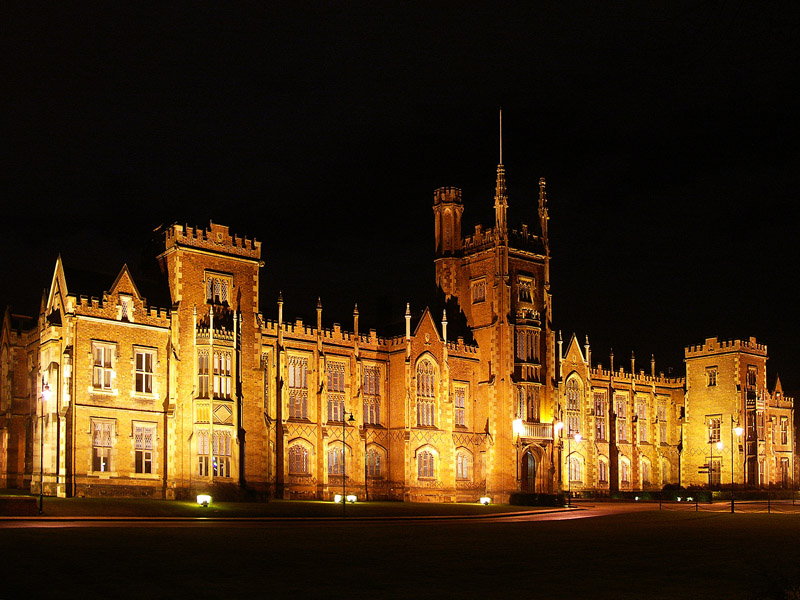
Queen's University, Belfast

Unlike most areas of the United Kingdom, in the last year of primary school, many children sit entrance examinations for grammar schools. Integrated schools, which attempt to ensure a balance in enrolment between pupils of Protestant, Roman Catholic, and other faiths (or none), are becoming increasingly popular, although Northern Ireland still has a primarily de facto religiously segregated education system. In the primary school sector, 40 schools (8.9% of the total number) are integrated schools and 32 (7.2% of the total number) are Gaelscoileanna (Irish language-medium schools).

As with the island of Ireland as a whole, Northern Ireland has one of the youngest populations in Europe and, among the four UK nations, it has the highest proportion of children aged under 16 years (21% in mid-2019). Statistics on education in Northern Ireland are published by the Department of Education and the Department for the Economy.

The main universities in Northern Ireland are Queen's University Belfast and Ulster University, and the distance learning Open University which has a regional office in Belfast.

=== Health ===
Since 1948 Northern Ireland has a health care system similar to England, Scotland and Wales, though it provides not only health care, but also social care. Health care performance has been decreasing since the mid-2010s and reached crisis levels since 2022.

== Culture ==
Northern Ireland shares both the culture of Ulster and the culture of the United Kingdom.

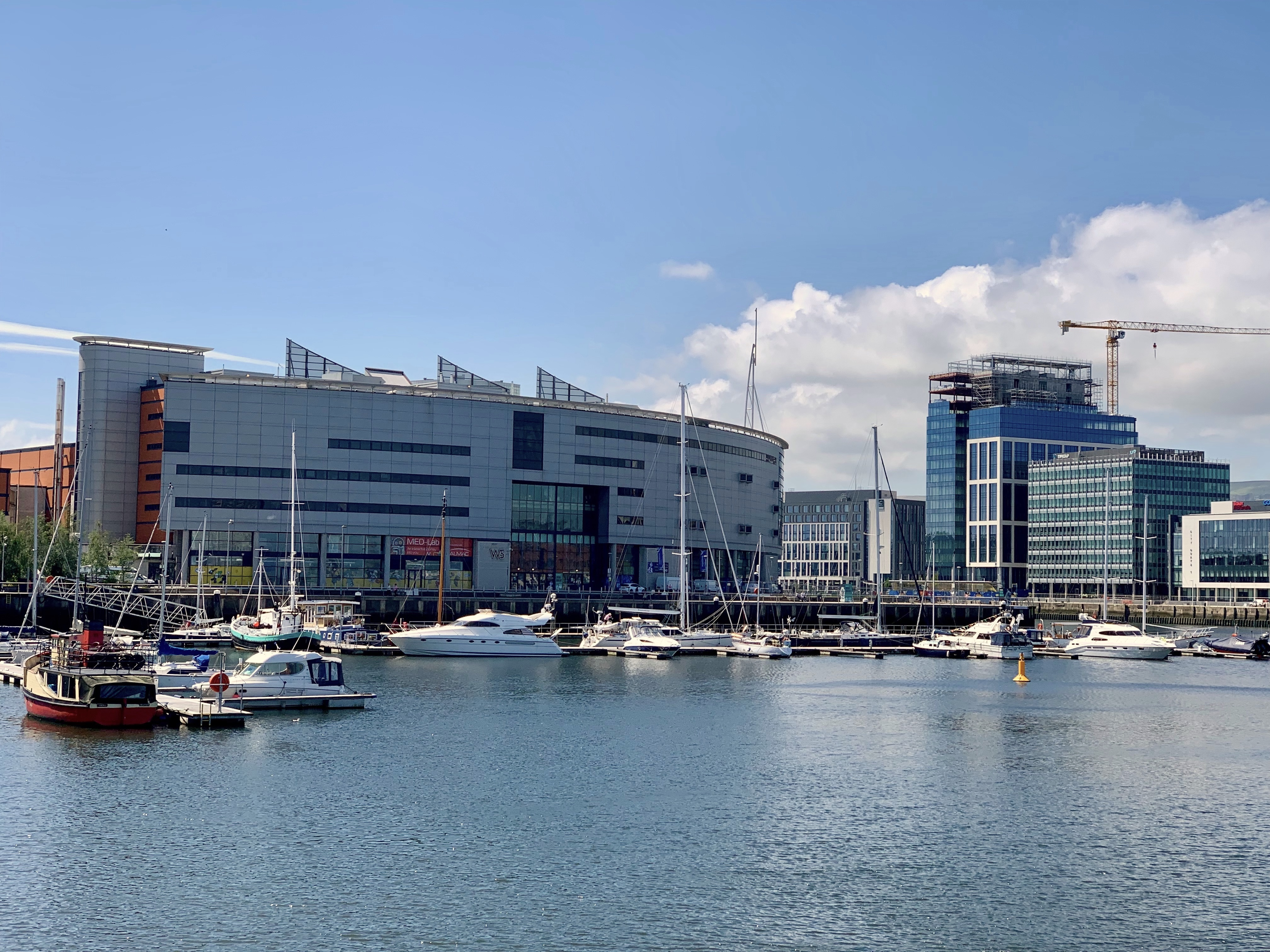
SSE Arena with 11,000 capacity on Belfast waterfront

Northern Ireland has witnessed rising numbers of tourists. Attractions include concert venues, cultural festivals, musical and artistic traditions, countryside and geographical sites of interest, public houses, welcoming hospitality, and sports (especially golf and fishing). Since 1987 public houses have been allowed to open on Sundays, despite some opposition.

Parades are a prominent feature of Northern Ireland society, more so than in the rest of Ireland or the United Kingdom. Most are held by Protestant fraternities such as the Orange Order, and Ulster loyalist marching bands. Each summer, during the "marching season", these groups have hundreds of parades, deck streets with British flags, bunting and specially-made arches, and light large towering bonfires in the "Eleventh Night" celebrations. The biggest parades are held on 12 July (The Twelfth). There is often tension when these activities take place near Catholic neighbourhoods, which sometimes leads to violence.

The Ulster Cycle is a large body of prose and verse centring on the traditional heroes of the Ulaid in what is now eastern Ulster. This is one of the four major cycles of Irish mythology. The cycle centres on the reign of Conchobar mac Nessa, who is said to have been the king of Ulster around the 1st century. He ruled from Emain Macha (now Navan Fort near Armagh), and had a fierce rivalry with queen Medb and king Ailill of Connacht and their ally, Fergus mac Róich, former king of Ulster. The foremost hero of the cycle is Conchobar's nephew Cúchulainn, who features in the epic prose/poem An Táin Bó Cúailnge (The Cattle Raid of Cooley, a casus belli between Ulster and Connaught).

=== Symbols ===
The Ulster Banner is used to represent Northern Ireland in association football and at the Commonwealth Games.

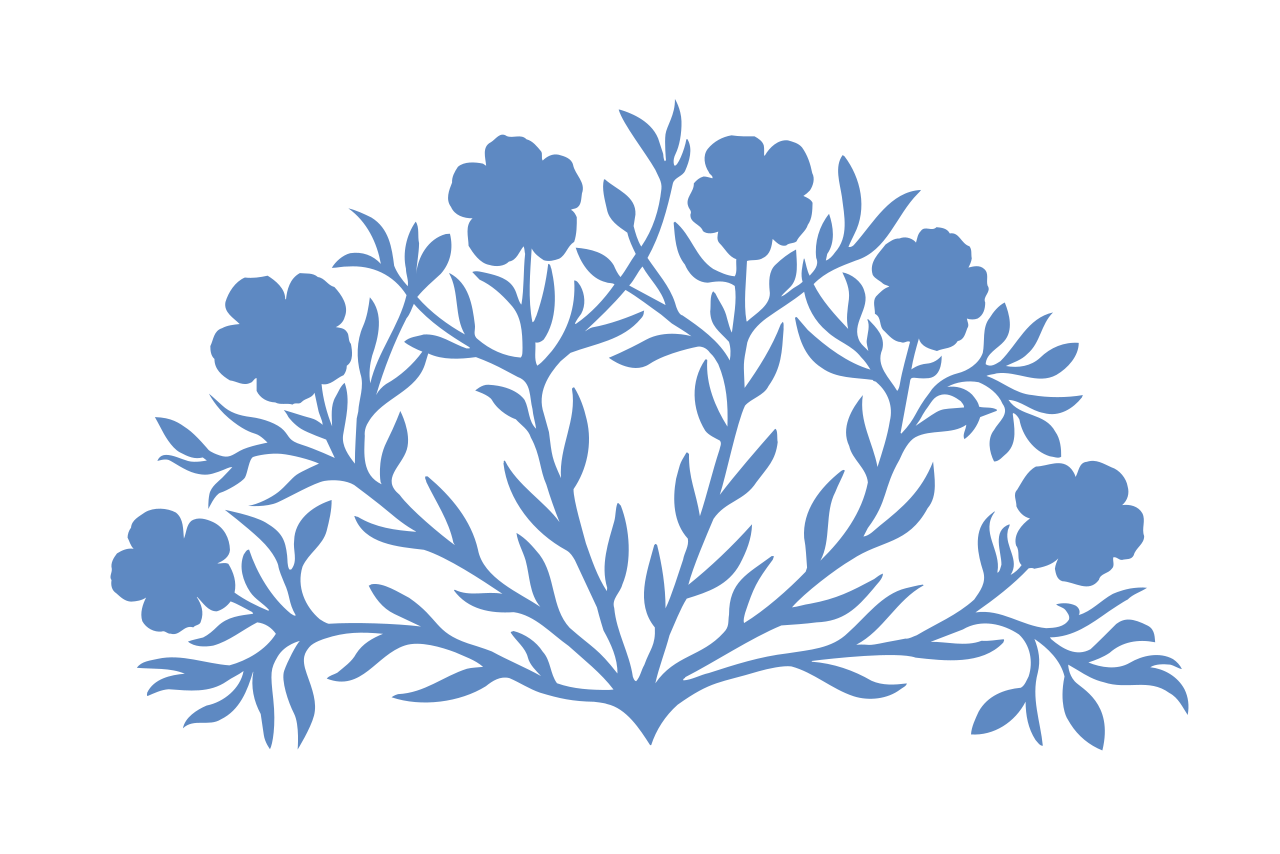
The logo for the Northern Ireland assembly is based on the flower of the flax plant.

Northern Ireland comprises a patchwork of communities whose national loyalties are represented in some areas by flags flown from flagpoles or lamp posts. The Union Jack and the former Northern Ireland flag are flown in many loyalist areas, and the Tricolour, adopted by republicans as the flag of Ireland in 1916, is flown in some republican areas. Even kerbstones in some areas are painted red-white-blue or green-white-orange, depending on whether local people express unionist/loyalist or nationalist/republican sympathies.

The official flag is that of the state having sovereignty over the territory, i.e. the Union Flag. The former Northern Ireland flag, also known as the "Ulster Banner" or "Red Hand Flag", is a banner derived from the coat of arms of the Government of Northern Ireland until 1972. Since 1972, it has had no official status. The Union Flag and the Ulster Banner are used exclusively by unionists. The UK flags policy states that in Northern Ireland, "The Ulster flag and the Cross of St Patrick have no official status and, under the Flags Regulations, are not permitted to be flown from Government Buildings."

The Irish Rugby Football Union and the Church of Ireland have used the Saint Patrick's Saltire or "Cross of St Patrick". This red saltire on a white field was used to represent Ireland in the flag of the United Kingdom. It is still used by some British Army regiments. Foreign flags are also found, such as the Palestinian flags in some nationalist areas and Israeli flags in some unionist areas.

The United Kingdom national anthem of "God Save the King" is often played at state events in Northern Ireland. At the Commonwealth Games and some other sporting events, the Northern Ireland team uses the Ulster Banner as its flag—notwithstanding its lack of official status—and the "Londonderry Air" (usually set to lyrics as "Danny Boy"), which also has no official status, as its national anthem. The Northern Ireland national football team also uses the Ulster Banner as its flag but uses "God Save The King" as its anthem. Major Gaelic Athletic Association matches are opened by the national anthem of the Republic of Ireland, "Amhrán na bhFiann (The Soldier's Song)", which is also used by most other all-Ireland sporting organisations. Since 1995, the Ireland rugby union team has used a specially commissioned song, "Ireland's Call" as the team's anthem. The Irish national anthem is also played at Dublin home matches, being the anthem of the host country.

Northern Irish murals have become well-known features of Northern Ireland, depicting past and present events and documenting peace and cultural diversity. Approximately 2,000 murals have been documented in Northern Ireland since the 1970s.

=== Media and communications ===
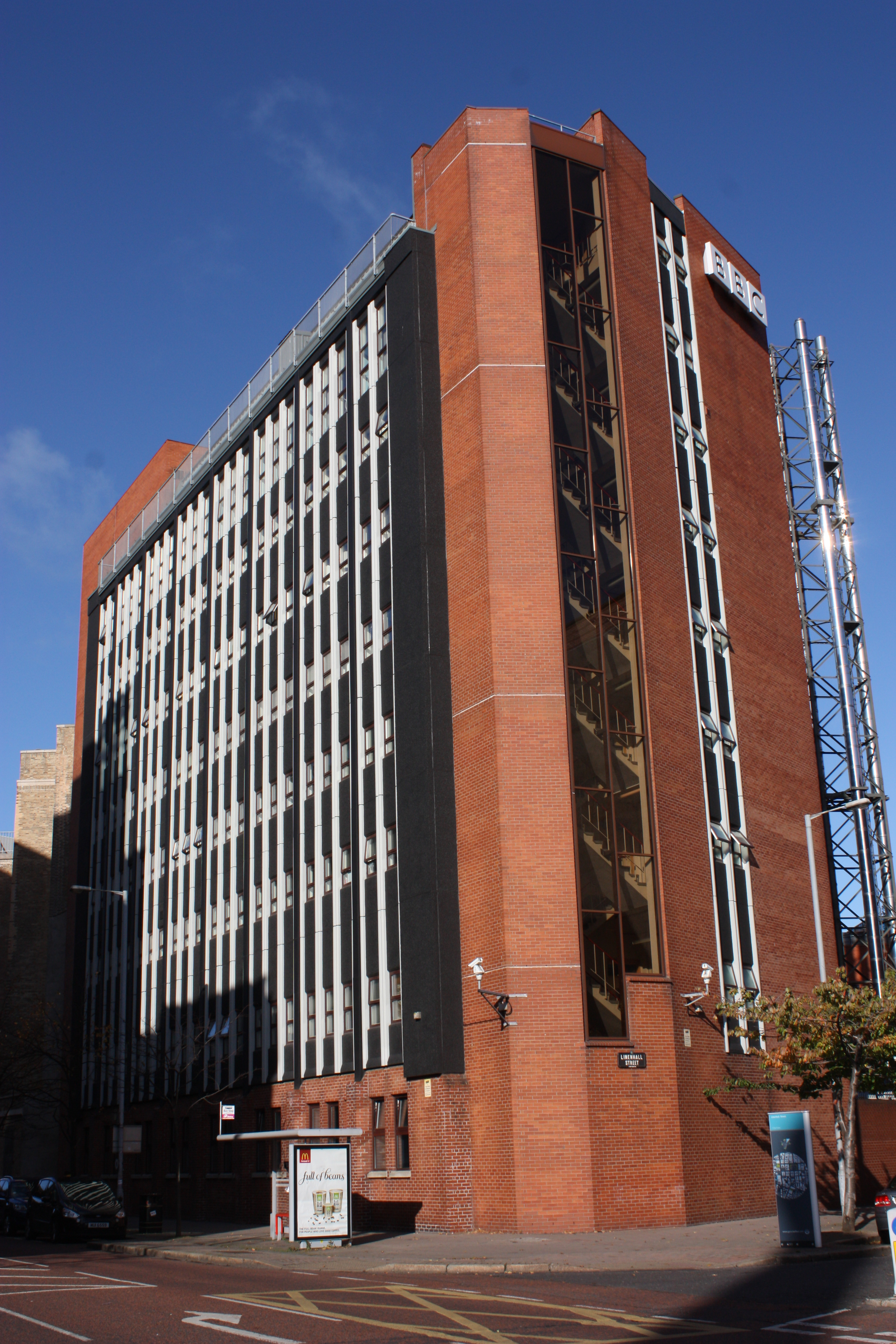
Broadcasting House, Belfast, home of BBC Northern Ireland

The BBC has a division called BBC Northern Ireland with headquarters in Belfast and operates BBC One Northern Ireland and BBC Two Northern Ireland. As well as broadcasting standard UK-wide programmes, BBC NI produces local content, including a news break-out called BBC Newsline. The ITV franchise in Northern Ireland is UTV. The state-owned Channel 4 and the privately owned Channel 5 also broadcast in Northern Ireland. Access is also available to satellite and cable services. All Northern Ireland viewers must obtain a UK TV licence to watch live television transmissions or use BBC iPlayer.

RTÉ, the national broadcaster of the Republic of Ireland, is available over the air to most parts of Northern Ireland via reception overspill of the Republic's Saorview service, or via satellite and cable. Since the digital TV switchover, RTÉ One, RTÉ2 and the Irish-language channel TG4, are now available over the air on the UK's Freeview system from transmitters within Northern Ireland. Although they are transmitted in standard definition, a Freeview HD box or television is required for reception.

As well as the standard UK-wide radio stations from the BBC, Northern Ireland is home to many local radio stations, such as Cool FM, Q Radio, Downtown Radio and U105. The BBC has two regional radio stations which broadcast in Northern Ireland, BBC Radio Ulster and BBC Radio Foyle.

Besides the UK and Irish national newspapers, there are three main regional newspapers published in Northern Ireland. These are the Belfast Telegraph, The Irish News and The News Letter. According to the Audit Bureau of Circulations (UK) the average daily circulation for these three titles in 2018 was:

Title	Market type	Print time	Political alignment	Format	Circulation Jan–Jun 2018	Circulation Jul–Dec 2018
Belfast Telegraph	Regional	Morning	Non-Sectarianism/British Unionism	Compact	35,931	33,951
The Irish News	Regional	Morning	Irish nationalism	Compact	33,647	32,315
News Letter	Regional	Morning	British unionism	Tabloid	13,374	12,499

Northern Ireland uses the same telecommunications and postal services as the rest of the United Kingdom at standard domestic rates and there are no mobile roaming charges between Great Britain and Northern Ireland. People in Northern Ireland who live close to the border with the Republic of Ireland may inadvertently switch over to the Irish mobile networks, causing international roaming fees to be applied. Calls from landlines in Northern Ireland to numbers in the Republic of Ireland are charged at the same rate as those to numbers in Great Britain, while landline numbers in Northern Ireland can similarly be called from the Republic of Ireland at domestic rates, using the 048 prefix.

=== Sport ===
==== Organisation of sport ====
Many sports are organised on an all-Ireland basis, with a single governing body or team for the whole island. The most notable exception is association football (soccer), which has a separate governing body, league and national team for Northern Ireland.

==== Football ====
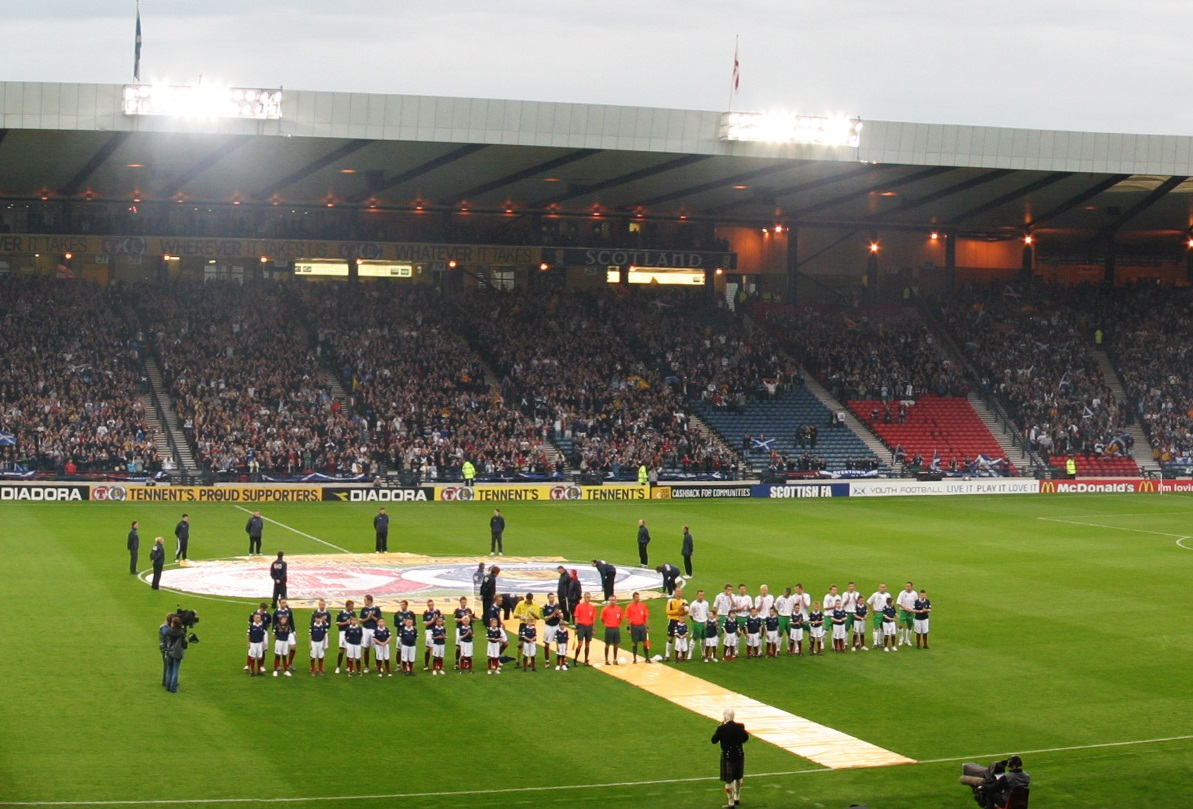
The Northern Ireland football team line up with the Scotland national team in football

The Irish Football Association (IFA) serves as the organising body for men's domestic and national association football in Northern Ireland, it is a member of the International Football Association Board which sets the rules for association football. The NIWFA are responsible for women's domestic and national association football in Northern Ireland.

The NIFL Premiership is a professional men's football league which operates at the highest division of the Northern Ireland Football League, the current format has been organised with 12 clubs. The winners will enter the first qualifying round of the Champions League, if they do not progress they will enter the Europa League or Europa Conference League depending on performance. The two runners-up progress to the Europa Conference League with play-offs for another Europa Conference League position. The NLFL Women's Premiership is a professional women's football league which operates at the highest division in Northern Ireland with 10 clubs. The winner qualifies for a spot in the UEFA Women's Champions League. The men's Northern Ireland national football team qualified for the 1958 FIFA World Cup, 1982 FIFA World Cup and 1986 FIFA World Cup, making it to the quarter-finals in 1958 and 1982 and made it the first knockout round in the European Championships in 2016.

==== Rugby ====
The IRFU is the governing body for the sport of Rugby Union on the island of Ireland (Northern Ireland and the Republic of Ireland). Rugby in Northern Ireland is run within the historic province of Ulster which includes Northern Ireland plus 3 counties from the Republic of Ireland - Donegal, Cavan and Monaghan.

The Ireland national rugby league team has participated in the Emerging Nations Tournament (1995), the Super League World Nines (1996), the World Cup (2000, 2008, 2013, 2017, 2021), European Nations Cup (since 2003) and Victory Cup (2004). The Ireland A rugby league team competes annually in the Amateur Four Nations competition (since 2002) and the St Patrick's Day Challenge (since 1995).

==== Cricket and golf ====
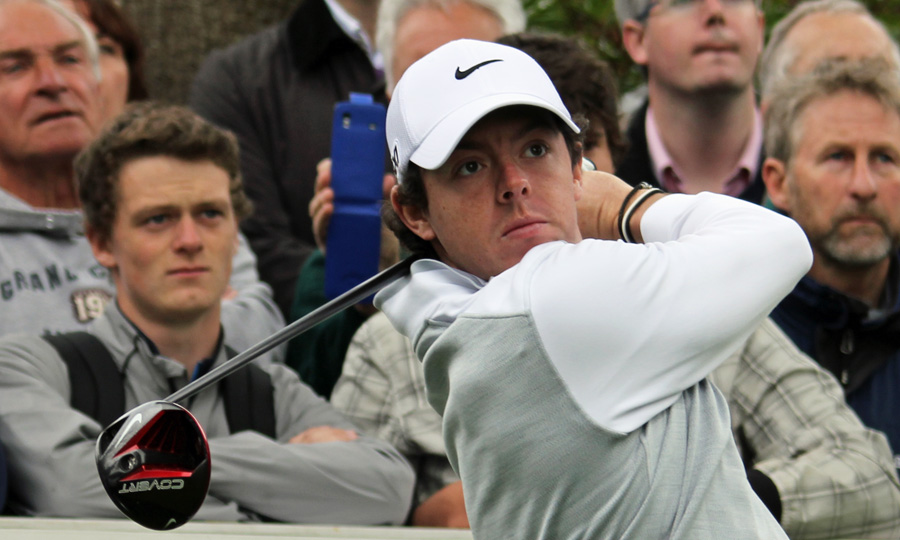
Prominent Northern Irish golfer Rory McIlroy

The Ireland cricket team represents both Northern Ireland and the Republic of Ireland. It is a full member of the International Cricket Council, having been granted Test status and full membership by the ICC in June 2017. The side competes in Test cricket, the highest level of competitive cricket in the international arena, and is one of the 12 full-member countries of the ICC. Ireland men's side has played in the Cricket World Cup and T20 World Cup and has won the ICC Intercontinental Cup four times. The women's side has played in the Women's World Cup. One of the men's side's regular international venues is Stormont in Belfast.

The governing body for golf on the island of Ireland is Golf Ireland, it is the successor to the Golfing Union of Ireland, governing body for men's and boy's amateur golf, and the oldest golfing union in the world, which was founded in Belfast in 1891, and the Irish Ladies Golf Union. Northern Ireland's golf courses include the Royal Belfast Golf Club (the earliest, formed in 1881), Royal Portrush Golf Club, which is the only course outside Great Britain to have hosted The Open Championship, and Royal County Down Golf Club (Golf Digest magazine's top-rated course outside the United States). Northern Ireland had three major champions in the space of just 14 months from the U.S. Open in 2010 to The Open Championship in 2011. Notable golfers include Fred Daly (winner of The Open in 1947), Ryder Cup players Ronan Rafferty and David Feherty, leading European Tour professionals David Jones, Michael Hoey (a five-time winner on the tour) and Gareth Maybin, as well as three recent major winners Graeme McDowell (winner of the U.S. Open in 2010, the first European to do so since 1970), Rory McIlroy (winner of six majors, including being one of six men to complete the career grand slam) and Darren Clarke (winner of The Open in 2011). Northern Ireland has also contributed several players to the Great Britain and Ireland Walker Cup team, including Alan Dunbar and Paul Cutler who played on the victorious 2011 team in Scotland. Dunbar also won The Amateur Championship in 2012, at Royal Troon.

== See also ==
- List of Ulster-related topics
- Outline of Northern Ireland
- Outline of the United Kingdom
