= European route E1 in the United Kingdom =

The European route E1 in the United Kingdom is a series of roads, part of the International E-road network running completely in the British region of Northern Ireland from Larne, by the capital Belfast to the Irish border at Newry. Eventually the route goes to the Republic of Ireland, Spain and Portugal.

== Route ==
The E1 starts at the port of Larne following the A8 towards Newtownabbey where it merges with the M2 motorway to Belfast. In the city centre, the route follows the A12 until the M1 motorway. At Lisburn the E1 takes exit 8 to the A1 towards Newry where it crosses the border with the Republic of Ireland changing to the Irish M1 motorway towards the capital Dublin. It has a total distance covered in the United Kingdom of 104 km (65 mi).

== Detailed route ==
E1 Larne - Newry
| District | National road number | Section | Junction |
|---|---|---|---|
| Mid and East Antrim | A8 road | Larne-Ballynure | Larne A2 towards Carrickfergus A36 towards Ballymena |
| Antrim and Newtownabbey | A8 road | Ballynure-Newtownabbey | Ballynure A57 towards Ballyclare Newtownabbey |
| Antrim and Newtownabbey | M2 motorway | Newtownabbey-Belfast | 4 Glengormley, Newtownabbey, Larne 2 A2, Greencastle, Carrickfergus |
| Belfast | M2 motorway | Belfast city | M5 towards Carrickfergus 1 Docks (N), Shore Road 1b Docks, Duncrue Street, Corporation street 1a M3 towards Belfast (E), Newcastle, Bangor, Belfast City Airport |
| Belfast | A12 road | Belfast city | A6 Belfast centre, Clifton Street, Mater Infirmorum Hospital Belfast centre, Falls Road, Divis Street Belfast centre, Grosvenor Road Belfast (W) (S) |
| Belfast | M1 motorway | Belfast city | 2 A55 Belfast (W) (S) 3 A1 Dunmurry, Finaghy |
| Lisburn and Castlereagh | M1 motorway | Belfast-Lisburn | 6 Lisburn, Saintfield, Ballynahinch 7 Lisburn, Sprucefield 8 Newry, Dublin |
| Lisburn and Castlereagh | A1 road | Lisburn-Dromore | A101 towards Lisburn Hillsborough |
| Armagh, Banbridge and Craigavon | A1 road | Dromore-Loughbrickland | Dromore Dromore Dromore, Lurgan B2 Dromore, Blackskull, Donaghcloney A26 Banbridge, Craigavon A50 Craigavon, Newcastle, Corbet Banbridge A26 Banbridge, Craigavon, Outlet Park B3 Loughbrickland, Tandragee, Rathfriland Loughbrickland |
| Newry, Mourne and Down | A1 road | Loughbrickland-Republic of Ireland | A28, A25, A2 Newry, Downpatrick, Warrenpoint A27, A28 Newry, Craigavon, Armagh A25 Newry, Camlough, Newry railway station Newry Bernisch Viewpoint A2, B113 Newry, Warrenpoint, Forkhill, Meigh B113 HM Customs and Excise |
| Republic of Ireland | M1 motorway | Towards Dundalk and Dublin | |
