= A6 road (Northern Ireland) =

Road in Northern Ireland

Coordinates: 54.86856°N 6.78191°W

A6

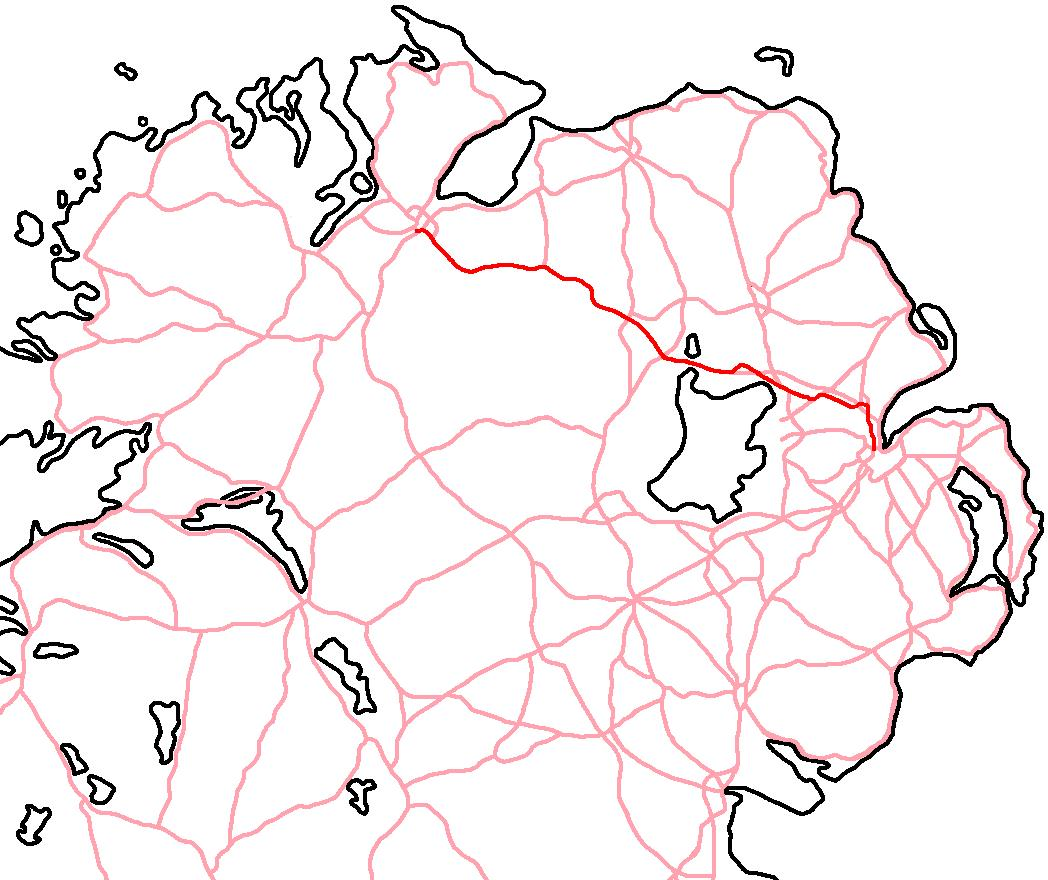
- The route of the A6 in red from Derry city to Belfast (County Antrim)

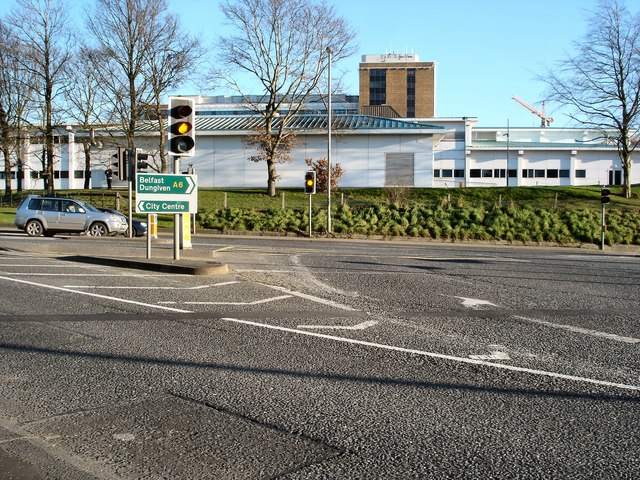
- Altnagelvin junction, Derry

Route information
- Length: 71.4 mi (114.9 km)

Major junctions
- East end: Belfast
- West end: Derry

Location
- Country: United Kingdom
- Constituent country: Northern Ireland
- Primary destinations: Antrim; Randalstown; Toome; Maghera; Dungiven

Road network
- Roads in Northern Ireland; Motorways; A roads in Northern Ireland

The A6 road in Northern Ireland runs for 71.4 miles (114.9 km) from Belfast to Derry, via County Antrim and County Londonderry. While stretches of the road before Randalstown have now been superseded by a motorway (the M2 and M22), the A6 remains one of the most important arterial routes in Northern Ireland, connecting its two largest cities and urban areas. Between Randalstown and Derry, the road forms part of European route E16.

The A6 begins at Carlisle Circus, a roundabout with Clifton Street and the Crumlin Road, running up the Antrim Road past Belfast Royal Academy towards Belfast Castle, Cavehill and Belfast Zoo and onwards through Glengormley. Much of this section is urban in character and there are many two-lane stretches, allowing vehicles to overtake or bus lanes operating at peak times or rush hour. Outside of Belfast, the majority of the road is now dual carriageway.

On the outskirts of Glengormley the route passes through Sandyknowes roundabout (M2 Junction 4) where it connects with the A8(M) route towards Ballyclare and Larne. The A6 then passes through the suburban district known as Mallusk which forms the outer-most periphery of the Greater Belfast urban area, characterised by industrial estates.

Thereafter the A6 becomes markedly rural in aspect. It passes under the Belfast-Derry Railway Line, through Templepatrick village (via a multiplex with the A57 Ballynure-Aldergrove road), Dunadry and then enters Antrim town. Passing the Antrim Forum and the ruins of Antrim Castle, the A6 forms a multiplex with the A26 (Coleraine-Banbridge road) and crosses the Six Mile Water.

Leaving Antrim town the road passes Massereene and Shane's Castle and then heads towards Randalstown. Until this point the A6 runs parallel with the M2 and M22 motorways, which since their construction in the 1960s/1970s have removed the vast bulk of the cross-country traffic from the A6. However, approximately one mile west of Randalstown, the A6 meets with the M22 motorway and from this point onwards the A6 carries almost all traffic bound for Mid-Ulster and the North West.

The A6 enters into County Londonderry after this, crossing the Bann between Lough Neagh and Lough Beg, and following the course of the Moyola toward Castledawson, where traffic for Magherafelt and Cookstown veers off southwards along the A31.

After Castledawson, the road reverts to single carriageway for the duration of the section known as the Glenshane Road. The A6 goes over generally flat agricultural land near the hamlet of Curran and the village of Knockcloghrim, passing the town of Maghera and cutting through the Sperrins mountain range via the Glenshane Pass. At Dungiven, the A6 reverts to dual carriageway along a bypass built to avoid the town itself which for many years caused a significant bottleneck on the route.

The A6 then passes Foreglen, Claudy, Burntollet, crossing a series of bridges to reach the eastern outskirts of Derry city. Upon entering the Derry urban area, the A6 goes through Drumahoe and passes Altnagelvin Hospital where it then continues via the Dungiven Road to the city centre.

The A6 ends at the bottom of the Glendermott Road at a traffic-light controlled junction with the A2 Limavady Road. City-bound traffic then follows the A2 along King Street and Duke Street before crossing the double-decked Craigavon Bridge over the River Foyle into the city centre.

== Investment ==
Investment in the northwestern region has greatly improved and modernised the route. As of 2023, 26.5 miles (42.6 km) of high-quality dual carriageway on stretches of the route between Belfast and Randalstown and Derry and Dungiven have been constructed through the A6 Dualling Scheme at an estimated total cost of £420m.

== Gallery ==
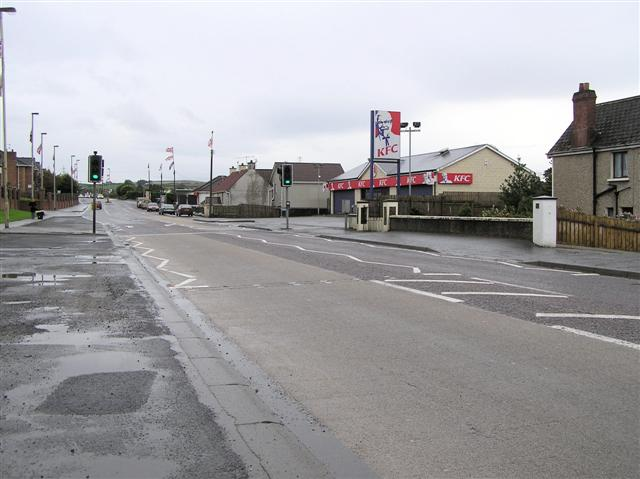
Drumahoe, County Londonderry

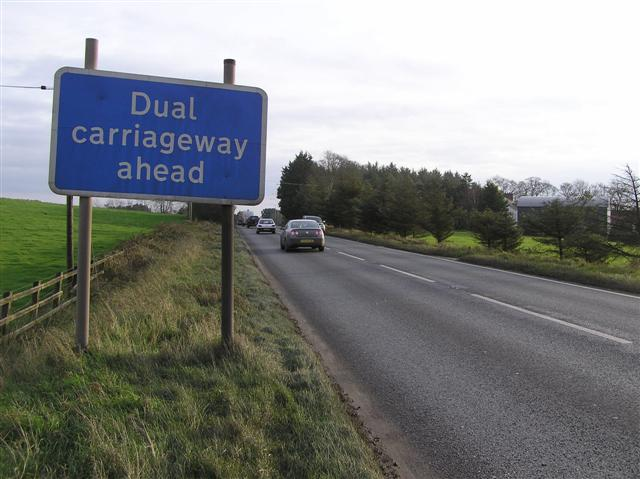
Near Randalstown, County Antrim
