= Belfast Urban Motorway =

Proposed roadway in Northern Ireland

The Belfast Urban Motorway was a proposed motorway system in Belfast, Northern Ireland announced in 1964, but was never completed. Only the Western portion was built as the A12, Westlink. It was to be built in three phases: Phase 1, from the M1 at Broadway to the M2 at York Street; Phase 2, from the M2 at York Street across the River Lagan to the M3 at the bottom of the Newtownards Road; and Phase 3, from the Newtownards Road south through Short Strand, back across the River Lagan, through Shaftesbury Square to join the start at the M1.

== Route ==
=== Route ===
The proposed route would have, start at the M2 from the north, with junctions at York Street, Clifton Street, and then Divis Street. The road would then continue to veer right, travelling towards the South, with a junction at Governor Street, and another onto the M1, the Motorway would then travel towards the East, with a junctions at Bradbury Place, another serving both University Road and Lisburn Road, and another at the Ormeau Road. Then the proposed M4 would have joined here, then another junction at Albertbridge Road, before crossing the River Lagan. The Motorway then follows the eastern bank of the River Lagan, before passing through the Mountpottinger area. The Motorway would then veer to the north, with a major junction for the M3, which would also serve the proposed M7, heading for Bangor and Dundonald respectively. This junction would also serve the Bridge End area, but the Short Strand area would have been largely obliterated by this scheme. The Motorway would continue north, crossing back over the River Lagan, with a junction serving the M2.

== History ==
Terence O'Neill. the then Prime Minister of Northern Ireland, planned major schemes to improve the financial situation of Northern Ireland, this included the Belfast Urban Motorway, to improve quality of roads in and out of Belfast and also to link other planned Motorways, most notably the M2, M1, M3 and M4. The Scheme was proposed in 1964, along with the wider province wide Motorway system. The scheme was incredibly complex and ambitious, at the time it was estimated that the entire project could be completed for £41.2m, £460m in 2001 prices.

== See also ==
- M22 motorway (Northern Ireland)
- List of motorways in the United Kingdom
- Roads in Ireland
- Belfast-Derry railway line
