= A36 road (Northern Ireland) =

Road in Northern Ireland

Coordinates: 54.817°N 6.046°W

A36

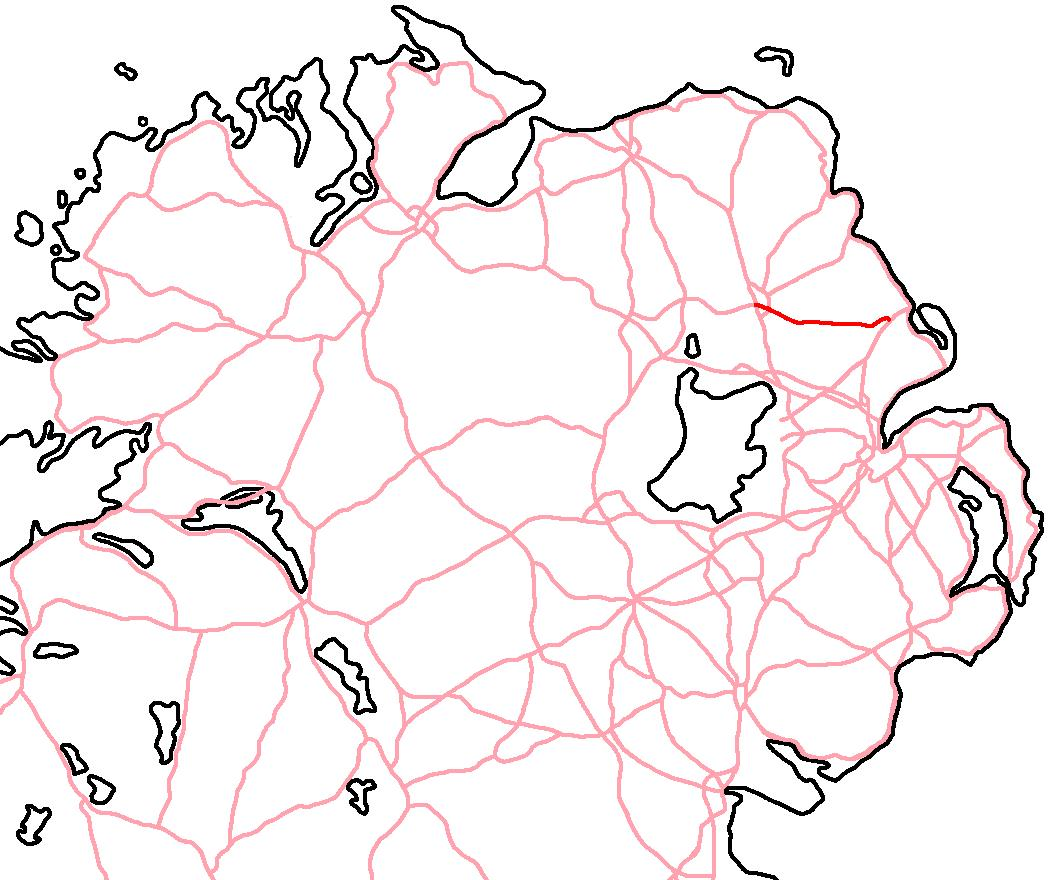
- Route of the A36 from Larne to Ballymena, marked in red

Major junctions
- A8; M2

Location
- Country: United Kingdom
- Constituent country: Northern Ireland
- Counties: Co. Antrim
- Primary destinations: Ballymena, Kilwaughter, Larne

Road network
- Roads in Northern Ireland; Motorways; A roads in Northern Ireland

The A36 is a road in Northern Ireland. It travels through County Antrim, connecting the large towns of Ballymena and Larne. The road is a single-carriageway primary route. It has three named sections: Church Road, Moorfields Road, and Shane's Hill or Shaneshill (Road).

== Route ==
The A36 commences at the Junction 10 roundabout of the M2 Ballymena by-pass. The road passes through the village of Moorfields, the hamlets of Glenwherry and Kilwaughter, and meets the B59 route coming south from Doagh and the B94 route from Ballyclare to Broughshane. The A36 terminates at a junction with the A8 dual carriageway on the outskirts of Larne.

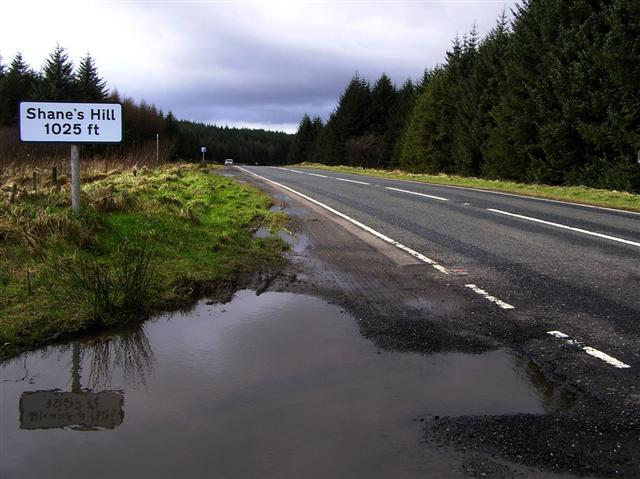
A36 at Shane's Hill

The A36's highest point is the 1,025-foot (312 m) summit of Shane's Hill.
