= A8(M) motorway (Northern Ireland) =

Road in Northern Ireland

A8(M)
- A8(M) highlighted in blue

Route information
- Part of E01 and E18
- Length: 1 mi (1.6 km)
- Existed: 1966–present

Major junctions
- North end: Newtownabbey
- South end: Newtownabbey

Location
- Country: United Kingdom
- Constituent country: Northern Ireland

Road network
- Roads in Northern Ireland; Motorways; A roads in Northern Ireland

The A8(M) is a motorway in County Antrim, Northern Ireland. It is 1 mile (1.6 km) long and is a spur of the M2 motorway. It was opened on 24 October 1966 and built at the same time as the M2 section to which it connects. It is part of the unsigned European routes E01 and E18.

The A8(M) does not meet any other motorways directly, with one end connecting to the A8, and the other connecting to the A6. The roundabout junction which links the A8(M) to the M2 is the A6.

Although both sides of the road are the same width, the northbound direction has three lanes, one of which is only partly open to traffic, while southbound only has two. Despite being one of the shortest motorways in Northern Ireland, it still includes matrix displays and is classified as a separate road, unlike other similar spurs, such as the Walton Summit motorway spur of the M65 motorway, which are classified as parts of other motorways.

== History ==
In 1956 proposals for several motorways, including the M2, were announced with the M2 running directly to Ballymena. Part of this alignment became the A8(M) when in 1964 further plans changed the route of the M2 via Antrim to Coleraine, away from its original direct alignment over difficult terrain, which is how the plans for construction were then progressed. This road was already under construction at Newtownabbey, so it was left as a spur. This section was renamed the A8(M) as it links to the A8 continuing as an A-road all the way to Larne.

== Junctions ==
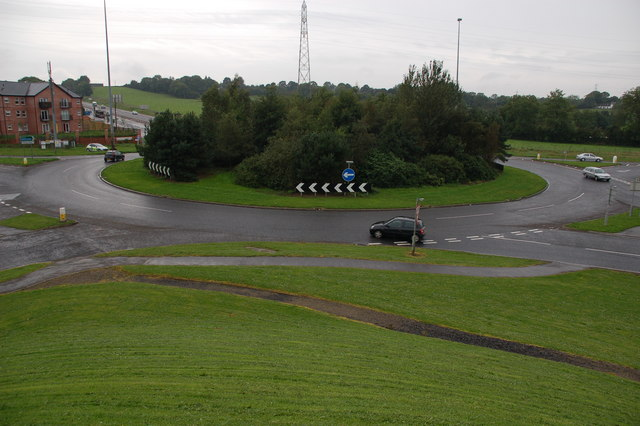
Corr's Corner near Glengormley

A8(M) motorway
Northbound exits	Junction	Southbound exits
Larne A8; Ballyclare B56 Glengormley	J1; Terminus	Start of motorway
Start of motorway	M2 J4; Terminus	Belfast, Derry, Antrim, Coleraine M2; Glengormley A6 Mallusk

== See also ==
- Roads in Ireland
- List of motorways in the United Kingdom
