= M5 motorway (Northern Ireland) =

Motorway in Northern Ireland

M5
- M5 highlighted in blue

Route information
- Length: 1.4 mi (2.3 km)
- Existed: 1980–present

Major junctions
- South end: Whitewell – M2
- M2 motorway
- North end: Hazelbank – A2

Location
- Country: United Kingdom
- Constituent country: Northern Ireland
- Primary destinations: Newtownabbey

Road network
- Roads in Northern Ireland; Motorways; A roads in Northern Ireland

The M5 is a 1.4-mile-long (2.3 km) spur motorway in north Belfast, Northern Ireland. It connects the M2 to the A2 Shore Road at Hazelbank in Newtownabbey. It is a dual two lane road with most of the road on a causeway in Belfast Lough in order to bypass Whitehouse beach.

== History & future development ==
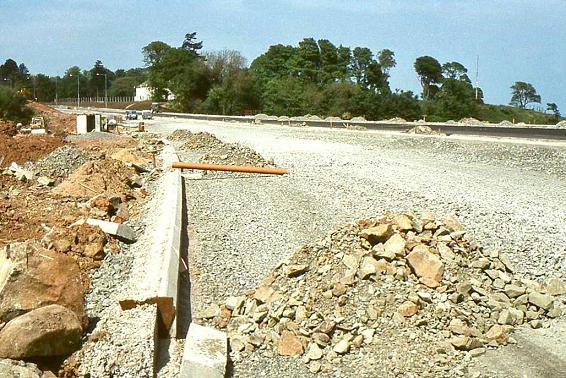
Building the M5 near Rushpark, Whiteabbey, 1980

Originally announced in 1964, the M5 was planned to follow the route of the B90 to Carrickfergus. Under the plans it would also have been the southern terminus of the unbuilt M6 Motorway to Larne. The scale of the scheme was reduced to its present form in the 1969 transport review, but it was recommended that the line of the originally planned route should be protected from development. Opening to traffic on 12 September 1980, the M5 was the only one of Northern Ireland's original motorway schemes to proceed after the cancellation of all the existing motorway plans in 1975 following the deterioration of civil order. The M3 later opened in 1995, and had the same number as the original planned motorway in east Belfast, but was a completely different project.

== Junctions ==
M5 motorway
Northbound exits	Junction	Southbound exits
End of motorway M2 motorway continues Belfast City Centre M2	M2, J2	Start of motorway
Start of motorway	J1	End of motorway Whiteabbey, Carrickfergus; Belfast (Shore Road) A2

== See also ==
- Roads in Ireland
- List of motorways in the United Kingdom
