= A2 road (Northern Ireland) =

Road in Northern Ireland

Coordinates: 54.682°N 5.880°W

A2

Route information
- Length: 239 mi (385 km)

Major junctions
- South end: Newry, County Down
- A1 in Newry; A24 in Clough Strangford Lough; M3, M2 and A12 Westlink in Belfast; M5 near Newtownabbey; A26 in Coleraine; A5; A40; A515 and A6 in Derry
- North end: At border crossing near Muff, County Donegal and Culmore, County Londonderry and Bridgend, County Donegal.

Location
- Country: United Kingdom
- Constituent country: Northern Ireland
- Primary destinations: Newry; Warrenpoint; Kilkeel; Newcastle; Strangford; Portaferry; Donaghadee; Bangor; Holywood; Belfast; Greenisland; Carrickfergus; Whitehead; Larne; Carnlough; Glenariffe Ballycastle; Bushmills; Portrush; Portstewart; Coleraine; Limavady; Derry; Letterkenny

Road network
- Roads in Northern Ireland; Motorways; A roads in Northern Ireland

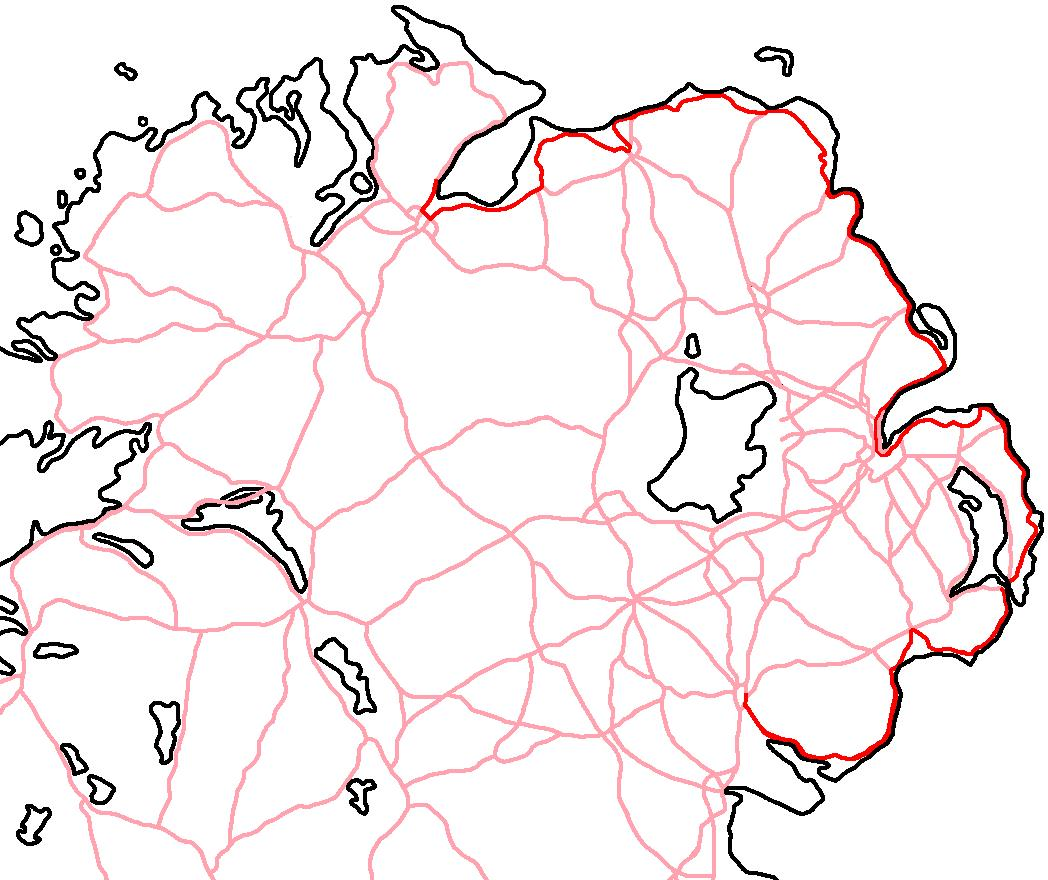
The A2 coastal route shown in red from Derry to Newry.

The A2 is a major road in Northern Ireland, a considerable length of which is often referred to the Antrim Coast Road because much of it follows the scenic coastline of County Antrim; other parts of the road follow the coasts in Counties Down and Londonderry.

Mainly a single lane in each direction, the road follows most of the coastline of Northern Ireland. It is connected in several places to other major roads.

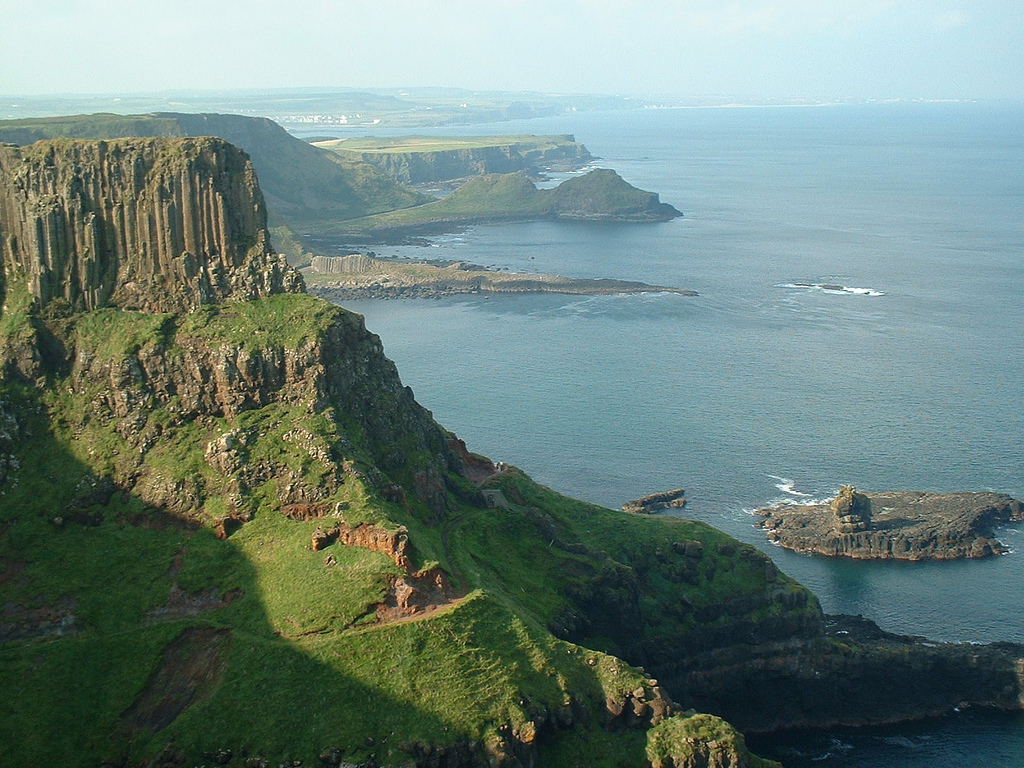
The Causeway Coast

== Route ==
The road begins in the city of Newry, County Down and heads south-east over the alignment of the former Newry, Warrenpoint and Rostrevor Railway through the fishing towns of Warrenpoint, Rostrevor and Kilkeel.

After Dundrum the road continues via Ardglass to Strangford, where it uses a ferry across Strangford Lough to reach Portaferry. From there it meets the Irish Sea coast of the Ards Peninsula at Cloughey, and follows it through Portavogie, Ballyhalbert, Millisle and Donaghadee to Bangor, County Down, from where it becomes a major dual carriageway leading to Belfast.

After its intersection with the M3, it continues through Belfast City Centre's complex one-way system via the Queen's Bridge and Queen Elizabeth Bridge, past the Custom House and on along Corporation Street, eventually joining York Road. Along this stretch and further out the Shore Road, the main route runs along the line of the M2 and M5, to a point where the M5 ends in Newtownabbey in the northern suburbs of Belfast.

After a suburban stretch through Jordanstown, Greenisland, Carrickfergus, Eden and Whitehead, the road enters open countryside on its way to Larne, where the most noteworthy section of the road, the Antrim Coast Road, begins.

After winding around the eastern coast from Larne to Cushendall the road continues along the north coast to Ballycastle before travelling along the Giant's Causeway Coast to Portrush and on through Coleraine where it crosses the River Bann using the Coleraine Bridge and then Derry, where it crosses the River Foyle using the Craigavon Bridge. From Derry, there are two separate routes to the border with the Republic of Ireland: one branch becomes the N13 which continues to Letterkenny in County Donegal; the other branch runs to Culmore, County Londonderry, meeting the border at Muff, County Donegal.

== Narrow Water bridge ==
In June 2024, construction began on the Narrow Water bridge connecting the road to the R173 road in Omeath, County Louth, under the Shared Island scheme.

== Antrim Coast Road ==
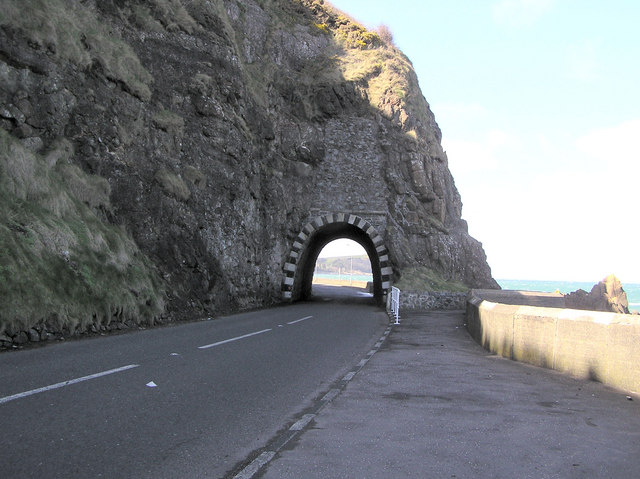
The Blackcave Tunnel or "Black Arch" at the start of the Antrim Coast Road at the northern edge of Larne.

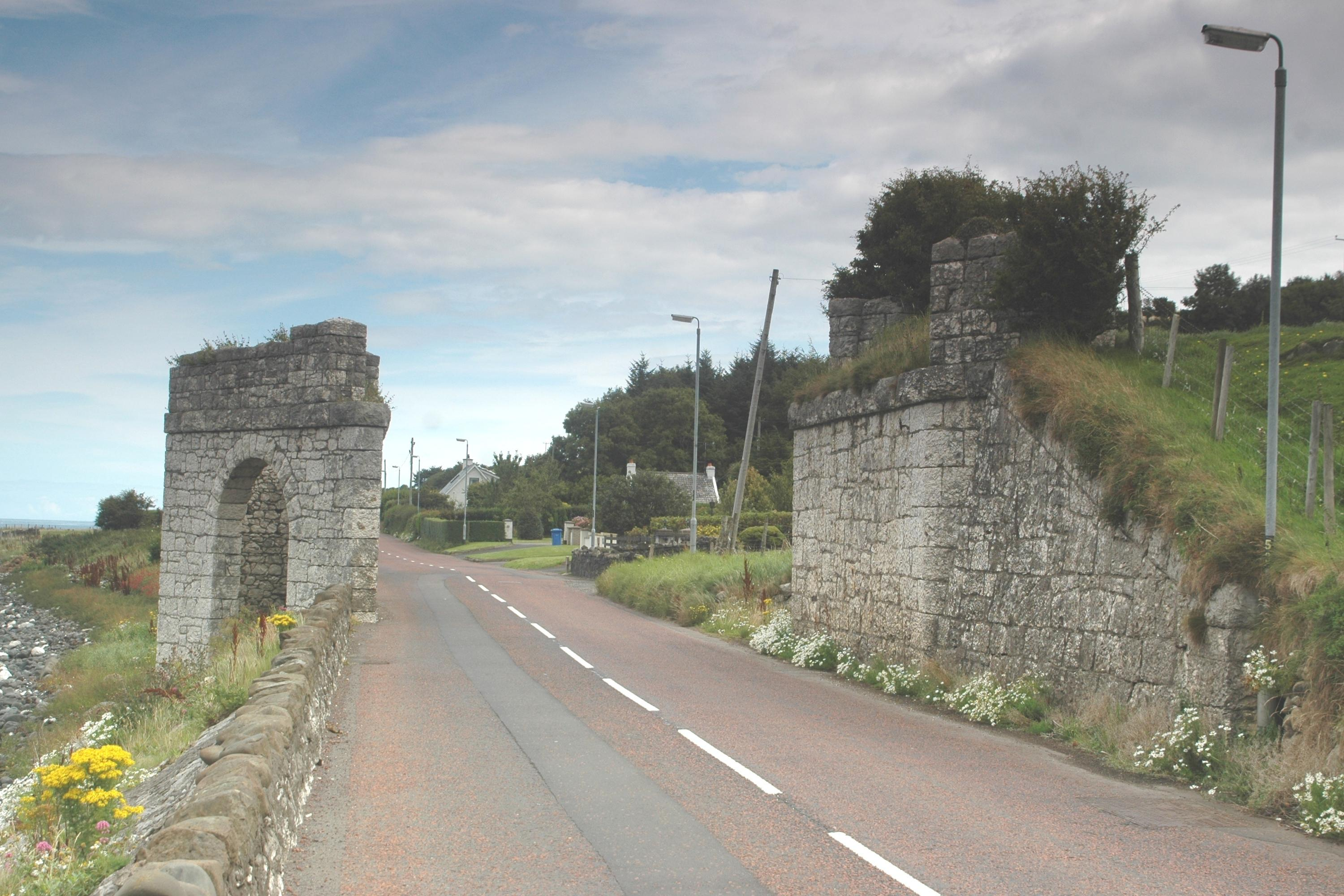
The "White Arch" at Waterfoot. It is the pier of a bridge built in 1873 for the Glenariff Iron Ore and Harbour Company as part of Ireland's first 3 ft (914 mm) gauge railway.

The Antrim Coast Road is regarded as one of the great tourist routes of the world. This part of the road has seen a dramatic increase in traffic in recent years (in particular during warmer weather). It runs along the coast for about 25 miles (40 kilometres), from the Black Arch near Larne to the Red Arch near Cushendall, passing through the villages of Ballygalley, Glenarm, Carnlough and Waterfoot. Motorists, cyclists and pedestrians should pay due care and attention as there are currently no cycle lanes and footpaths are infrequent.

Early in the 19th century, in the reign of William IV, the Commissioners of Public Works in Ireland reported that the Glens of Antrim were "cut off from any reasonable communication by the badness of roads over mountains and slopes varying from 1 in 6 to 1 in 12". The Commissioners conceived a great project to build the Antrim Coast Road to give better access for the inhabitants, open up the Glens for trade, and give a form of unemployment relief.

The Antrim Coast Road was promoted by the Commissioners, but it was their civil engineer, William Bald, who had the vision of building the road along the foot of the cliffs. He did so between 1832 and 1842, supervised by the County Surveyors of the day – Thomas Woodhouse (1832–1836) and Charles Lanyon (1836–1842).

It was a great achievement for its day and made a great difference to the people of the Glens. Before the road was built they sailed across the North Channel to Scotland to trade their goods, because the short sea crossing was easier than travel by land to the nearest market town.

William Bald had the vision of building the road along the foot of the cliffs, some of them over 330 feet (101 m) high. This was a novel idea, as previous plans had been to build the road some distance inland. But this would have meant steep gradients as the road traversed the valleys of the Glens as they ran down from the Antrim Plateau to the sea. Bald decided to blast the cliff face which then fell down onto the foreshore to form the base for the new road.

In his report to the Commissioners Bald stated:

"30,0000 cubic yards of rock have been hurled down on the shore almost entirely by blasting, which has been executed by care and judgement. This has been greatly assisted by the use of Beckford's Patent Safety fuse, an invention of the greatest certainty and economy which reduces, in a great degree, the chance of those accidents to which the operation of the miners has been particularly liable."

The Antrim Coast Road was completed in 1842 at a cost of £37,140 – some £12,000 over budget – much to the displeasure of the Commissioners. It then remained largely unchanged until the late 1960s. But there were frequent rockfalls because the geology of the Antrim Coast is Ulster White Limestone, greatly faulted and fissured, which bears a considerable overburden of basalt, also weathered and rotten near the surface.

In February 1967 there was a major fall of rock onto the road south of Glenarm, and in May 1967 there was another which completely blocked the road. At this point the cliffs are about 330 feet (101 m) high so Antrim County Council decided to build a new road 100 feet (30 m) on the seaward side of the old one. The Council did the work largely by direct labour and started to acquire the plant and equipment needed for the job. The council opened a quarry and began to build a new embankment, but on the night of 31 October 1968 there was a one in 70-year storm that washed away the part of the causeway that had not yet been protected by rock armour. The work resumed in 1969 and a reinforced concrete sea wall was built, again by direct labour. Altogether 97,000 tonnes of rock armour were placed and the scheme was completed in November 1970, over three years after the road was closed.

William Bald was a civil engineer who left a great legacy to the people of the Glens of Antrim, and created one of the finest tourist routes in the World. But despite extensive research no portrait of him can be found.

Bald has two memorials. The first is a small plaque on the road just north of Larne. A second memorial was erected in August 2008 in Burntisland by the Institution of Civil Engineers and the Burntisland Heritage Trust.

Ian Paisley, the long-standing Member of Parliament for North Antrim, called the road "one of the most beautiful in the whole of the United Kingdom".

== Tourist attractions ==
Owing to its length and the fact that it follows the coast, the road passes a large number of Northern Ireland's tourist attractions. These include:

- The Mourne Mountains.
- Carrickfergus Castle, a Norman castle built in 1177.
- The Glens of Antrim, a series of steep coastal valleys and hills with spectacular scenery.
- Ballycastle, site of the 400-year-old Ould Lammas Fair.
- Bushmills, site of the Old Bushmills Distillery which was founded in 1608.
- Dunluce Castle, dating from the 13th century and battered by the Atlantic Ocean.
- Carrick-a-Rede Rope Bridge, a rope bridge to the tiny Carrick Island.
- Portrush, and the nearby Giant's Causeway.
- Derry and its Walled City.
