= Belfast Deaf United Football Club =

Deaf football club from Belfast, Northern Ireland

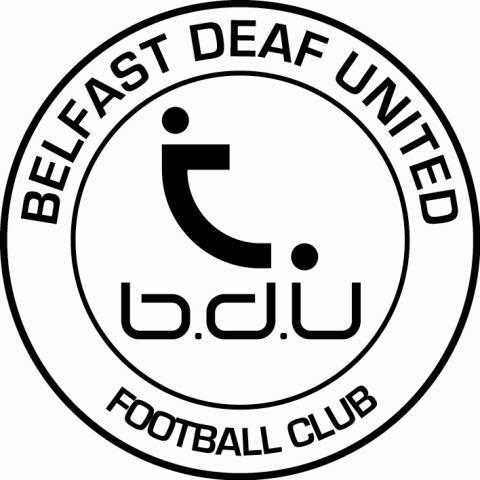
- Founded: 1900
- League: Down Area Winter Football League (as of 2020)

Belfast Deaf United is the only deaf football club in Northern Ireland and, as of 2020, was playing in the Down Area Winter Football League. One of two deaf football clubs on the island of Ireland, the club play their home matches at the City of Belfast playing fields at Mallusk.

The club was originally known as the Belfast Deaf Mute Football Club and reputedly founded in 1900. The first club chairperson was Francis Maginn, a deaf activist in the early 20th century. Maginn was elected, along with other club officers, at a meeting held in August 1900. In September 1929, the club were admitted to the "Belfast Minor League". The football club played until World War II when, after the war, three local deaf football clubs were formed; Ulster Institute for the Deaf (FP), Kinghan Church (KC) and St Joseph's. After these three clubs folded in the late 1960s, management representatives from each former club got together and decided to form Belfast Deaf United. The new club was formed in 1967.

Belfast Deaf United has played in various football leagues across the Greater Belfast area since its formation, including the Down Area League and the Belfast District Football League. The club has also participated in the annual British Deaf Cup, a tournament which involves the top deaf football clubs across the United Kingdom. Competing in the British Deaf Cup on several occasions, the club won the competition in 2011, 2012 and 2014. A number of club members have also represented Ireland at the Deaflympics.
