= European route E019 =

Road in trans-European E-road network

E019

Route information
- Length: 270 km (170 mi)

Major junctions
- From: Petropavl
- To: Zapadnoe

Location
- Countries: Kazakhstan

Highway system
- International E-road network; A Class; B Class
← E018	→ E1

E 019 is a European B class road in Kazakhstan, connecting the cities Petropavl - Zapadnoe.

== Route ==
- Kazakhstan
  - Petropavl
  - Zapadnoe
