= Niblack =

Niblack is a surname. Notable people with the surname include:

- Albert Parker Niblack (1859–1929), American admiral
- Silas L. Niblack (1825–1883), American politician, cousin of William
- William E. Niblack (1822–1893), American politician

== See also ==
- Niblock
