= European route E803 =

Road in trans-European E-road network

E-803

Route information
- Length: 463 km (288 mi)

Major junctions
- From: Salamanca
- Mérida
- To: Seville

Location
- Country: Spain

Highway system
- International E-road network; A Class; B Class

European route E 803 is a European B class road in Spain, connecting the cities Salamanca – Cáceres – Mérida – Seville.

== Route ==
- Spain
  - A-66: Salamanca ( E80) - Mérida ( E90) - Sevilla
  - SE-30: Sevilla ( E1 E5)
