= M22 motorway (Northern Ireland) =

Motorway in Northern Ireland

M22
- M22 highlighted in blue

Route information
- Part of E16
- Length: 5.6 mi (9.0 km)
- Existed: 1971–present
- History: Constructed 1971–1973

Major junctions
- West end: A6 – Randalstown
- M2 Motorway
- East end: M2 – Niblock

Location
- Country: United Kingdom
- Constituent country: Northern Ireland
- Primary destinations: Niblock

Road network
- Roads in Northern Ireland; Motorways; A roads in Northern Ireland

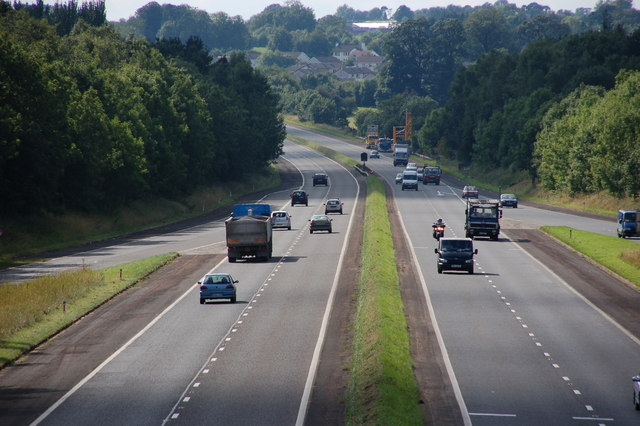
View west towards Castledawson at Ballygrooby near Randalstown

The M22 is a motorway in County Antrim, Northern Ireland. It is 5.6 miles (9 km) long and connects the A6 with the M2. It forms part of the unsigned European route E16.

== History ==
In 1964, the Northern Ireland Government announced plans for an extensive network of motorways. Part of this was an M22 motorway from the M2 near Antrim to Castledawson, County Londonderry. With the increase in civil disorder, known as the Troubles, and the introduction of direct rule, the motorway programme was nearly all cancelled and the M22 was left as it currently stood in 1975.

It was opened in two sections:

- Junction 1 to 2 opened in 1971; and
- Junction 2 to 3 opened in 1973.

As of May 2019, the A6 from the western end of the M22 to Castledawson is under construction as a dual carriageway.

== Route ==
The motorway starts shortly after junction 7 of the M2 Northwards at the split in the carriageways on the M2 around 1 mile from junction 1 of the M22, where the M2 was to head north towards Ballymena. After meeting junction 1 – the site of the Junction One retail outlet – it continues west across Ferguson's Water, the Belfast-Derry railway line and Mill Burn as it bypasses the suburbs of Antrim to the north. Between junctions 2 and 3 it passes between Randalstown and the Randalstown forest, crosses the River Main, and then ends at junction 3. The M22 is a two-lane dual carriageway throughout its length.

== Junctions ==
M22 motorway
Westbound exits	Junction	Eastbound exits
End of motorway M2 motorway continues Belfast, Larne, Antrim Area Hospital M2; International Airport Antrim, Ballymena A26	1	Start of motorway
Randalstown A6	2	Randalstown A6 Portglenone (B52)
Start of motorway	3	End of motorway Londonderry A6 Magherafelt (A31); Cookstown (A29) Randalstown

== See also ==
- Roads in Ireland
- List of motorways in the United Kingdom
