= Westlink (road) =

Road in Belfast, Northern Ireland

Coordinates: 54.59203°N 5.94562°W

Westlink

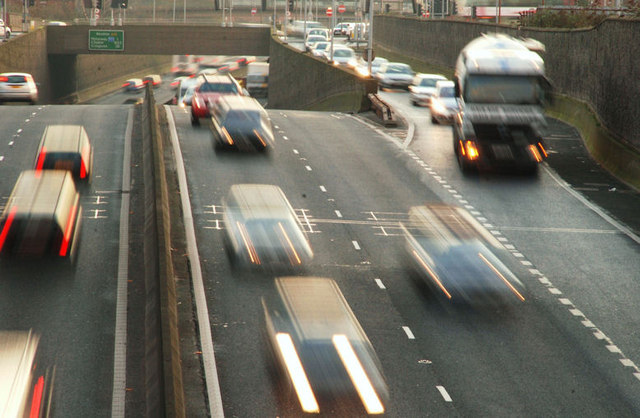
- Westlink at Divis Street junction.

Route information
- Part of E01 and E18
- Length: 2 mi (3.2 km)
- Existed: 1981–present
- History: Constructed 1981–1983

Major junctions
- North end: M2 Junction 1a M3
- South end: M1 Junction 1

Location
- Country: United Kingdom
- Constituent country: Northern Ireland

Road network
- Roads in Northern Ireland; Motorways; A roads in Northern Ireland
→ M1

The Westlink road in Belfast, Northern Ireland is a dual carriageway throughpass, designated the A12, connecting the M1 to the M2 and M3 motorways which run south, north and east of the city, respectively. The road forms part of European route E01.

== History ==
Originally planned in 1964 as the Belfast Urban Motorway, the route was to have been fully grade-separated and would have completely encircled the city centre. Due to lack of money and public opposition only the western portion was completed and this was originally not fully grade-separated.

The entire road was built to dual two-lane standard. The southbound section from Grosvenor Road to Broadway was widened to three lanes in 2002. Major upgrade work completed in 2009 extended the third lane to the newly completed Broadway underpass, where the road now seamlessly merges into the M1 Motorway.

The underpass opened on Friday 4 July 2008. On Saturday 16 August 2008 it completely filled with water due to several hours of torrential rainfall. This earned it the nickname 'The Wetlink'.

The Westlink was built in two phases. Phase 1, connecting the M1 at Broadway to Grosvenor Road opened in February 1981. Both of these junctions were built as at-grade roundabouts, with a traffic-light junction serving Roden Street and Mulhouse Road halfway between. Phase 2, extending the scheme from Grosvenor Road to York Street, was completed in March 1983. This section has two grade-separated junctions at Divis Street and Clifton Street and passes under Peter's Hill. The York Street terminus is at-grade and links to the M2 and, since its opening in January 1995, to the M3.

== Criticism / Future plans ==
The Westlink has garnered much negative publicity over the years, owing to rush-hour traffic bottlenecks at its major intersections. The major renovation work from 2006 to 2009 has seen the full grade-separation of the Broadway and Grosvenor Road junctions via underpasses and a third traffic lane is being added in both directions between Broadway and Divis Street. Left-in/left-out sliproads provided at Mulhouse Road (for access to the Royal Victoria Hospital), the closure of access to Roden Street and the provision of a segregated busway from Broadway into the Europa Buscentre were also completed.

Detractors of this scheme point out that it will merely cause additional bottlenecks at the entry/exit point at York Street. However, plans to upgrade this junction to a fully free-flowing interchange have progressed (as of 16 March 2016) to the point where the scheme has been tendered. Construction was expected to run from November 2017 to December 2020, relying on the expected funding being allocated. As of December 2025, construction remains uninitiated.
