= List of motorways in the United Kingdom =

UK motorways in 2026 M-designated motorway Upgraded A-road designation

Interactive map of the UK motorway system

This list of motorways in the United Kingdom is a complete list of motorways in the United Kingdom. Note that the numbering scheme used for Great Britain for both motorways and classified roads does not include roads in Northern Ireland, which has a separate numbering system.

== Great Britain ==
The following motorways are sorted following the motorway numbering scheme used in Great Britain.

=== M-designated motorways ===
Link	Route	Ceremonial counties (England) Council areas (Scotland) Principal areas (Wales)	Existed since	Highest junction to junction average daily vehicle flow 2019	mi	km
M1	A south-north motorway linking London to Leeds. The first long-distance motorway in the country to be built.	Greater London, Hertfordshire, Bedfordshire, Buckinghamshire, Northamptonshire, Leicestershire, Nottinghamshire, Derbyshire, South Yorkshire, West Yorkshire	1959	168,763	193.5	311.4
M11	A south-north motorway linking London to Cambridge and Stansted Airport.	Greater London, Essex, Cambridgeshire	1975	121,964	55.0	88.5
M18	A southwest-northeast motorway linking Rotherham to Goole	South Yorkshire, East Riding of Yorkshire	1967	108,855	26.5	42.6
M180	A west-east motorway linking Thorne to Grimsby. Continues as the A180 after the exit for the Humber Bridge.	South Yorkshire, Lincolnshire	1977	48,780	25.0	40.2
M181	A spur of the M180 leading to Scunthorpe.	Lincolnshire	1978	18,213	0.7	1.1
M2	A west-east motorway bypassing Rochester, Sittingbourne and Faversham.	Kent	1963	106,582	25.7	41.4
M20	A west-east motorway linking London to Folkestone and the Channel Tunnel. Continues as the A20.	Kent	1971	120,348	50.6	81.4
M23	A north-south motorway linking London to Gatwick Airport and Crawley.	Surrey, West Sussex	1974	110,574	15.9	25.6
M25	A ring road of London numbered clockwise from Dartford.	Kent, Surrey, Berkshire, Greater London, Buckinghamshire, Hertfordshire, Essex	1975	216,108	117	188
M26	An east-west motorway linking the M25 to the M20.	Kent	1980	70,674	9.9	15.9
M27	A west-east motorway linking Southampton to Portsmouth.	Hampshire	1972	134,210	25.0	40.2
M271	A spur of the M27 bypassing Southampton to the west.	Hampshire	1975	53,678	2.3	3.7
M275	A spur from the M27 to central Portsmouth and Cosham.	Hampshire	1976	86,291	2.0	3.2
M3	A northeast-southwest motorway linking London to Southampton.	Surrey, Hampshire	1971	136,059	58.6	94.3
M32	A spur from the M4 into central Bristol.	Gloucestershire, Bristol	1966	84,898	4.4	7.1
M4	An east-west motorway linking London to Cardiff and South Wales. Continues as the A48 at the west end and as the A4 at the east end.	Greater London, Buckinghamshire, Berkshire, Wiltshire, Gloucestershire, Monmouthshire, Newport, Cardiff, Vale of Glamorgan, Rhondda Cynon Taff, Bridgend, Neath Port Talbot, Swansea, Carmarthenshire	1963	161,807	189	304
M40	A southeast-northwest motorway linking London to Birmingham.	Buckinghamshire, Oxfordshire, Northamptonshire, Warwickshire	1967	133,490	89.0	143.2
M42	A motorway from the M5 terminus bypassing Birmingham to the south and east, continuing to the M1 at Kegworth as the A42.	Worcestershire, Warwickshire, West Midlands, Leicestershire	1976	154,532	40.0	64.4
M45	A spur from the M1 south of Rugby.	Warwickshire, Northamptonshire	1959	19,536	7.9	12.7
M48	An alternative route to the M4 between Bristol and Caldicot.	Gloucestershire, Monmouthshire	1966	22,632	12	19
M49	A northwest-southeast motorway western bypass of Bristol Terminating at the M4 on the northwest end and at the M5 on the southeast end.	Bristol, Gloucestershire	1996	22,461	5.0	8.0
M5	A northeast-southwest motorway in South West England, linking Birmingham to Exeter.	West Midlands, Worcestershire, Gloucestershire, Bristol, Somerset, Devon	1962	127,584	162.9	262.2
M50	A west-east motorway between the M5 and Ross-on-Wye.	Worcestershire, Gloucestershire, Herefordshire	1960	32,032	21.6	34.8
M53	A north-south motorway linking Birkenhead (and Liverpool via Kingsway Tunnel) to Chester.	Merseyside, Cheshire	1972	79,872	18.9	30.4
M54	An east-west motorway linking Wolverhampton to Telford.	Staffordshire, Shropshire	1975	70,652	23.0	37.0
M55	An east-west motorway linking Preston to Blackpool.	Lancashire	1958	84,905	12.2	19.6
M56	A west-east motorway linking Manchester to Liverpool and Chester.	Greater Manchester, Cheshire	1971	174,693	33.3	53.6
M57	An eastern bypass of Liverpool linking the M62 to Maghull.	Merseyside	1972	99,521	10	16
M58	A west-east motorway linking Liverpool to Wigan.	Merseyside, Lancashire, Greater Manchester	1977	49,376	12	19
M6	A southeast-northwest motorway linking the West Midlands to North West England and Scotland. Continues as A74(M). The first and longest motorway in the country to be built.	Leicestershire, Warwickshire, West Midlands, Staffordshire, Cheshire, Merseyside, Greater Manchester, Lancashire, Cumbria	1958	173,201	232.2	373.7
M6 Toll	A tolled bypass of the M6 in the West Midlands.	West Midlands, Staffordshire, Warwickshire	2003	110,489	27	43
M60	A ring road of Manchester numbered clockwise from Stockport.	Greater Manchester	1998	180,501	36	58
M602	A west-east motorway linking the M62 to Salford.	Greater Manchester	1971	73,292	4.0	6.4
M606	A spur from the M62 to Bradford.	West Yorkshire	1972	77,277	3.0	4.8
M61	A north-south motorway linking Preston to Manchester.	Greater Manchester, Lancashire	1969	150,331	20.0	32.2
M62	A west-east motorway linking Liverpool to Hull.	Merseyside, Cheshire, Greater Manchester, West Yorkshire, North Yorkshire, East Riding of Yorkshire	1960	161,700	107	172
M621	An east-west motorway linking Leeds to the M1 and M62.	West Yorkshire	1972	103,207	7.7	12.4
M65	A west-east motorway linking Preston to Burnley and Colne.	Lancashire	1981	82,970	25.8	41.5
M66	A north-south motorway linking Ramsbottom to Manchester.	Lancashire, Greater Manchester	1975	111,851	8.0	12.9
M67	A west-east motorway linking Manchester to Hadfield.	Greater Manchester	1978	58,435	5.0	8.0
M69	A northeast-southwest motorway linking Leicester to Coventry.	Warwickshire, Leicestershire	1976	64,828	15.7	25.3
M73	An eastern bypass of Glasgow.	North Lanarkshire, Glasgow, South Lanarkshire	1969	95,331	7.0	11.3
M74	A northwest-southeast motorway linking Glasgow to North West England. Continues as the A74(M) south of Abington.	Glasgow, North Lanarkshire, South Lanarkshire	1966	107,475	40	60
M77	A north-south motorway linking Glasgow to Kilmarnock.	Glasgow, East Renfrewshire, East Ayrshire	1977	94,151	20.0	32.2
M8	An east-west motorway linking Edinburgh to Glasgow.	Edinburgh, West Lothian, North Lanarkshire, Glasgow, Renfrewshire	1965	160,484	60.3	97.0
M80	A southwest-northeast motorway linking Glasgow to Stirling.	Glasgow, North Lanarkshire, Falkirk, Stirling	1974	104,305	25.0	40.2
M876	A southwest-northeast motorway linking Bonnybridge to Kincardine.	Falkirk	1980	42,611	8.0	12.9
M898	A spur from the M8 leading to Erskine Bridge.	Renfrewshire	1975	51,831	0.5	0.8
M9	A southeast-northwest motorway linking Edinburgh to Stirling.	Edinburgh, West Lothian, Falkirk, Stirling	1968	68,143	33.0	53.1
M90	A south-north motorway linking Edinburgh to Perth.	Edinburgh, Fife, Perth and Kinross	1964	76,503	36.0	57.9

=== Upgraded A-road designations ===
Link	Route	Ceremonial counties (England) Council areas (Scotland) Principal areas (Wales)	Existed since	Highest junction to junction average daily vehicle flow 2019	mi	km
A1(M)	A south-north motorway split into four sections: from South Mimms to Baldock; from Huntingdon to Peterborough; as a western bypass of Doncaster; from Pontefract to Newcastle-upon-Tyne.	Hertfordshire, Bedfordshire, Cambridgeshire, Nottinghamshire, South Yorkshire, West Yorkshire, North Yorkshire, County Durham, Tyne and Wear	1961	143,012	145.3	233.9
A1077(M)	A spur from the M181 to Scunthorpe.	Lincolnshire	2021	18,213	1.6	2.6
A167(M)	An urban motorway in Newcastle-Upon-Tyne.	Tyne and Wear	1975	63,911	1.1	1.8
A194(M)	A south-north motorway linking the A1(M) to the Tyne Tunnel.	Tyne and Wear	1975	42,802	4.0	6.4
A3(M)	A north-south motorway linking the A3 to the A27 near Portsmouth.	Hampshire	1979	92,989	5.0	8.0
A308(M)	A spur from the M4 south of Maidenhead. Continues as the A308 in Windsor.	Berkshire	1971	23,541	0.6	0.97
A329(M)	A southeast-northwest motorway linking Bracknell to Reading.	Berkshire	1972	69,520	4.0	6.4
A38(M)	A spur from the M6 to central Birmingham.	West Midlands	1972	146,908	2.0	3.2
A404(M)	A spur from the M4 to High Wycombe. Continues as the A404 west of Maidenhead.	Berkshire	1961	59,816	2.4	3.9
A48(M)	A spur from the M4 to central Cardiff.	Newport, Cardiff	1977	47,203	2.0	3.2
A57(M)	Forms part of a ring road of Manchester. Also known as the Mancunian Way.	Greater Manchester	1967	90,785	2.0	3.2
A58(M)	Forms the western part of the Leeds inner ring road.	West Yorkshire	1964	81,647	2.0	3.2
A627(M)	A south-north motorway linking Rochdale to Oldham.	Greater Manchester	1972	55,749	3.5	5.6
A64(M)	Forms the eastern part of the Leeds inner ring road.	West Yorkshire	1969	43,617	0.5	0.8
A66(M)	A spur from the A1(M) to the A66 south of Darlington.	North Yorkshire	1965	15,337	2.0	3.2
A74(M)	A northwest-southeast motorway linking the M74 to North West England. Continues as the M6.	South Lanarkshire, Dumfries and Galloway, Cumbria	1991	41,662	45	72
A8(M)	A spur from the M8 and M73 to Ballieston.	Glasgow	2016	10,586	0.2	0.32
A823(M)	A spur from the M90 to Dunfermline.	Fife	1964	20,363	1.0	1.6

=== Former motorways ===
Link	Year designated	Year decommissioned	Lifespan	Description
M10	1959	2009	50 years	A spur that ran from the M1 to St Albans, now part of the A414.
M41	1970	2000	30 years	The former number for the West Cross Route, now part of the A3220.
A102(M)	1967	2000	33 years	The former number for the East Cross Route, split into two sections: from Hackney Wick to Old Ford; from the Greenwich Peninsula to the Sun in the Sands roundabout.; Now split between the A12 and A102.
A40(M)	1970	2000	30 years	The former number for the Westway, now part of the A40.
A41(M)	1973	1987	14 years	A section of the A41 that bypassed Tring, now part of the A41.
A601(M)	1960	2023	63 years	A spur that ran from the M6 to Carnforth and Over Kellet. Now part of the A6070 and B6601.
A6144(M)	1987	2006	19 years	A spur that ran from the M60 to Carrington. It was unique for being single carriageway throughout. Downgraded to a portion of the A6144.

=== Renumbered motorways ===
Original number	Year designated	New number	Year renumbered	Duration	Description
M63	1968	M60	1998	30 years	Originally opened as a portion of the M62 in 1960. In anticipation of the 1974 opening of the westward extension of the M62 to Liverpool, this section of the M62 was renumbered to M63 in 1968. Now part of the M60.
A18(M)	1972	M180	1978	6 years	Ran from the M18 at what is now junction 5 north of Hatfield to the A18. Now part of the M180.

== Northern Ireland ==
=== M-designated motorways ===
Link	Route	Existed since	Council areas
M1	An east-west motorway linking Belfast to Dungannon. Continues as the A4.	1962	Belfast, Lisburn and Castlereagh, Armagh City, Banbridge and Craigavon, Mid Ulster
M2	A southeast-northwest motorway split into two sections: from Belfast to Antrim; as an eastern bypass of Ballymena.; Continues as the A26.	1969	Belfast, Antrim and Newtownabbey, Mid and East Antrim
M3	A spur from the M2 to the A2 in east Belfast.	1995	Belfast
M5	A spur from the M2 to Newtownabbey in north Belfast.	1980	Belfast, Antrim and Newtownabbey
M12	A spur from the M1 to Portadown.	1970	Armagh City, Banbridge and Craigavon
M22	A spur from the M2 to Randalstown. Continues as the A6.	1971	Antrim and Newtownabbey

=== Upgraded A-road designations ===
Link	Route	Existed since	Council areas
A8(M)	A spur from the M2 to the A8 northwest of Newtownabbey.	1966	Antrim and Newtownabbey

== See also ==
- List of motorway service areas in the United Kingdom
- Roads in the United Kingdom
- List of numbered roads in the British Isles
- Motorways in the Republic of Ireland
- List of controlled-access highway systems
- Evolution of motorway construction in European nations
