= List of numbered roads in the British Isles =

This is a list of numbered roads in the United Kingdom, the Crown Dependencies and Ireland.

== Euroroutes ==
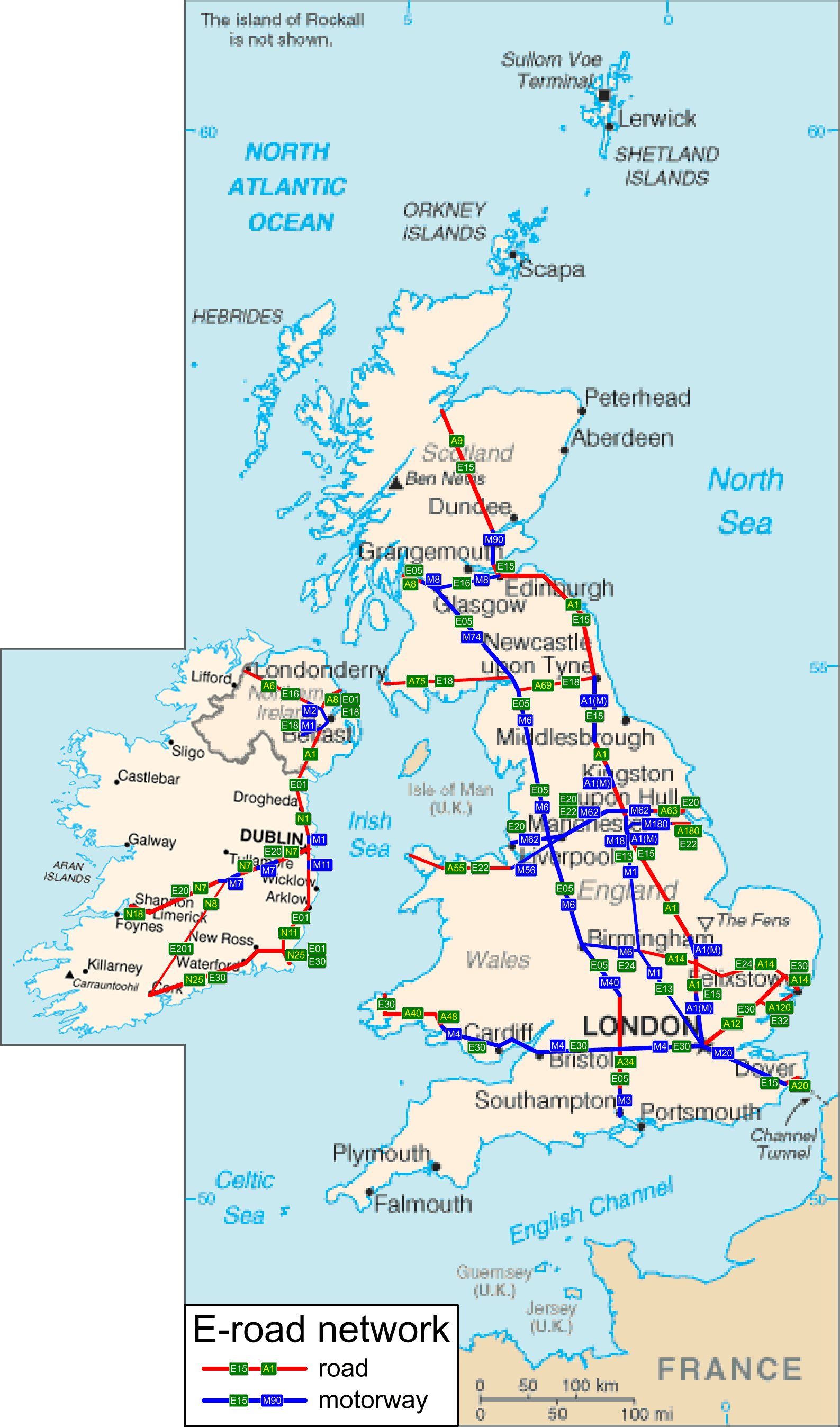

European routes are not listed or commonly used in the United Kingdom. They are shown on road signs (as small, supplemental numbers) but not commonly used in the Republic of Ireland.

Name	North/West end	South/East end	Length
E01	Larne, County Antrim, Northern Ireland	Rosslare Harbour, County Wexford, Republic of Ireland	233 miles (375 km)
E05	Greenock, Inverclyde, Scotland	Southampton, Hampshire, England	454 miles (731 km)
E13	Doncaster, South Yorkshire, England	London, England	130 miles (210 km)
E16	Derry, County Londonderry, Northern Ireland	Edinburgh, Scotland	108.3 miles (174.3 km)
E18	Craigavon, County Armagh, Northern Ireland	Newcastle upon Tyne, Tyne and Wear, England	248 miles (399 km)
E20	Shannon, County Clare, Republic of Ireland	Kingston upon Hull, East Riding of Yorkshire, England	412 miles (663 km)
E22	Holyhead, Anglesey, Wales	Immingham, North East Lincolnshire, England	226 miles (364 km)
E24	Coleshill, Warwickshire, England	Ipswich, Suffolk, England	158 miles (254 km)
E30	Cork, County Cork, Republic of Ireland	Felixstowe, Suffolk, England	541.2 miles (871.0 km)
E32	Colchester, Essex, England	Harwich, Essex, England	19 miles (31 km)
E201	Portlaoise, County Laois, Republic of Ireland	Cork, County Cork, Republic of Ireland	166 miles (267 km)

== Major roads ==
The numbering zones for roads in Great Britain

- Great Britain
    - A roads: Zone 1
    - Zone 2
    - Zone 3
    - Zone 4
    - Zone 5
    - Zone 6
    - Zone 7
    - Zone 8
    - Zone 9
- Northern Ireland
  - List of A roads in Northern Ireland
- Isle of Man
  - List of roads in the Isle of Man
- Jersey
  - Transport in Jersey § A-roads
- Ireland
  - National primary road § List of National Primary Roads
  - National secondary road § List of national secondary roads

== Minor roads ==
- Great Britain
    - B roads: Zone 1
    - Zone 2
    - Zone 3
    - Zone 4
    - Zone 5
    - Zone 6
    - Zone 7
    - Zone 8
    - Zone 9
- Northern Ireland
  - List of B roads in Northern Ireland
- Ireland
  - Regional road (Ireland) § Route definitions
