= A8 road (Northern Ireland) =

Road in Northern Ireland

Coordinates: 54.78322°N 5.94386°W

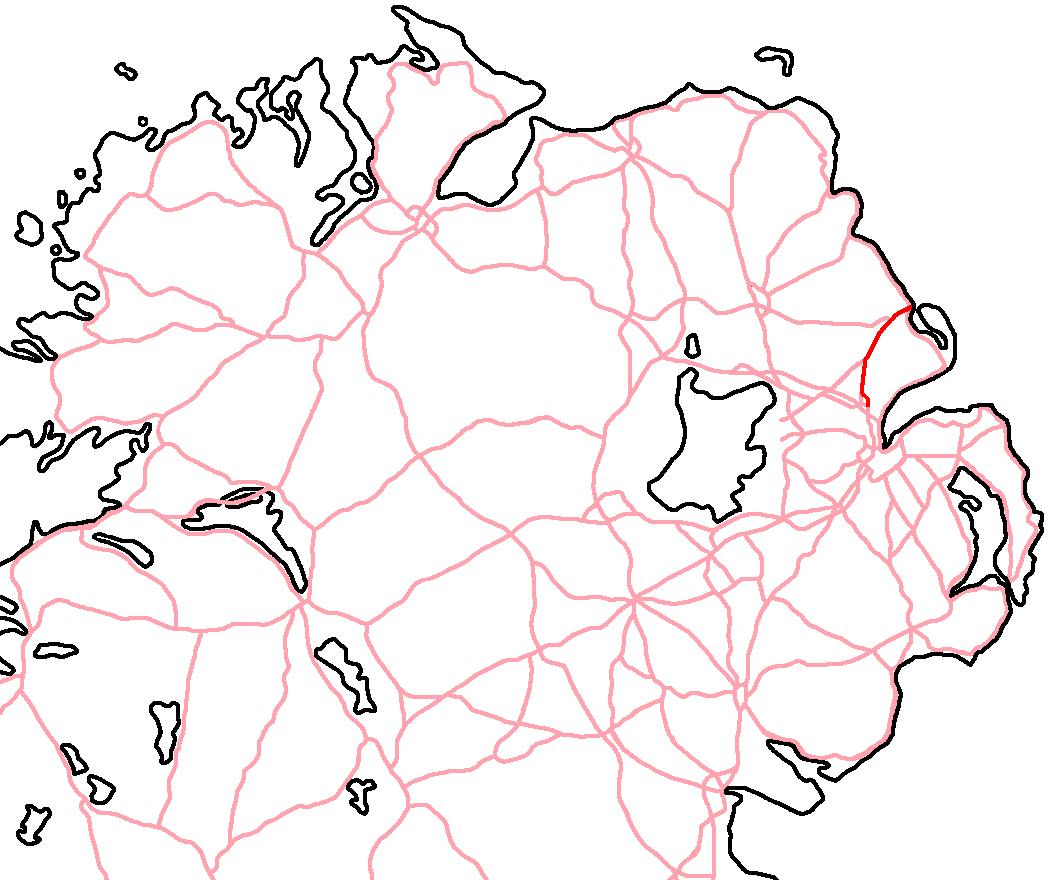
The route of the A8 in red from Glengormley (Co. Antrim) to Larne (Co. Antrim).

The A8 in Northern Ireland is a 26.1 km (16.2 miles) route connecting the city of Belfast with the harbour town of Larne. One of the busiest routes in the region, the road forms part of the unsigned European routes E01 and E18.

== Route ==
For many years predominantly single carriageway, a major upgrade of the road to dual-carriageway was completed in 2015 which grade separated all major junctions between Coleman's Corner roundabout and Larne.

Beginning at junction 4 of the M2 motorway the road is under motorway restrictions as the A8(M) for around 1.6 km until it meets a roundabout at Corr's Corner. From this point the road is dual carriageway of varying standard for the entirety of its length, meeting roundabouts at Coleman's Corner and just before Larne. The Harbour Highway, bypassing Larne, is dual carriageway, and includes a grade-separated junction with the A2 and provides a direct link to the Port of Larne.

=== 2015 Upgrade ===
Beginning in 2012, a major upgrade project costing £133m was undertaken to upgrade the remaining single carriageway section between Coleman's Corner and Larne to High-quality dual carriageway and replace all major junctions with grade separated overbridges or LILO junctions to improve safety on a previously very dangerous road. In addition, the village of Ballynure, for many years a major bottleneck on the route, was bypassed as part of the part the scheme.
