= Niblock =

Niblock is a surname. Notable people with the surname include:

- David Niblock (born 1981), Irish Gaelic footballer
- Mickey Niblock, Irish Gaelic footballer
- Phill Niblock (1933-2024), American composer and filmmaker
- Robert Niblock, American business executive, CEO of Lowe’s

== See also ==
- Niblack
