= European route E1 =

Road in trans-European E-road network

E1

Northern segment
- North end: Larne, United Kingdom
- Major intersections: E16 from Newtownabbey to Belfast, United Kingdom; E18 at Lisburn, United Kingdom; E20 from Dublin to Tallaght, Ireland; E30 at Wexford, Ireland
- South end: E30 at Rosslare, Ireland

Southern segment
- North end: Ferrol, Spain
- Major intersections: E70 at A Coruña, Spain; E82 at Porto, Portugal; E80 at Aveiro, Portugal; E801 at Coimbra, Portugal; E80 / E90 at Lisbon, Portugal; E90 at Setúbal, Portugal
- South end: E5 / E803 at Seville, Spain

Location
- Countries: United Kingdom, Ireland; Spain, Portugal

Highway system
- International E-road network; A Class; B Class
← E019	→ E3

European route E1 is a series of roads in Europe, part of the United Nations International E-road network, running from Larne, United Kingdom to Seville, Spain. There is a sea crossing between Rosslare Harbour in Ireland, and Ferrol, Spain, but no ferry service. The road also passes through Portugal – past the city of Porto, through the capital, Lisbon, and then south to the Algarve, passing Faro before reaching the Spanish border west of Huelva.

== Northern segment ==
As with all E-roads in the United Kingdom, the E1 is not signed. It begins in Larne, County Antrim as the A8. A short section of the A8 at Newtownabbey is under motorway regulations and is signed as the A8(M) motorway. This motorway joins the much longer M2 motorway to Belfast. At Belfast, the road becomes the A12 Westlink, a dual carriageway which links to the M1 motorway. The A1 leaves the motorway near Lisburn and continues south as a dual carriageway. This takes the road over the border into Ireland near Newry.

The dual carriageway continues in the Republic of Ireland as the N1, which from Ballymascanlon in County Louth onwards is under motorway regulations and signed as the M1 motorway. The road follows the M1 south to Dublin, where, in the northern suburbs, it meets Dublin's ring road, the M50 motorway. It follows the M50 through the outer suburbs of Dublin until it meets the short M11 motorway near Shankill. The M11 continues as a dual carriageway, the N11, south of Bray in County Wicklow. This section passes through the Glen of the Downs Nature Reserve and is dual carriageway until Coynes Cross, north of Wicklow. It becomes motorway once more until just north of Oylegate in County Wexford. Following this, the remainder of the route in is single carriageway and passes through a number of villages. The N11 continues to Wexford, where at a junction outside the town it meets the N25 road from Cork. The route follows the N25 to its final destination of Rosslare Europort.

All remaining sections of the N11 (and therefore E1) outside of Dublin are due to be replaced by motorways or dual carriageways.

== Southern segment ==
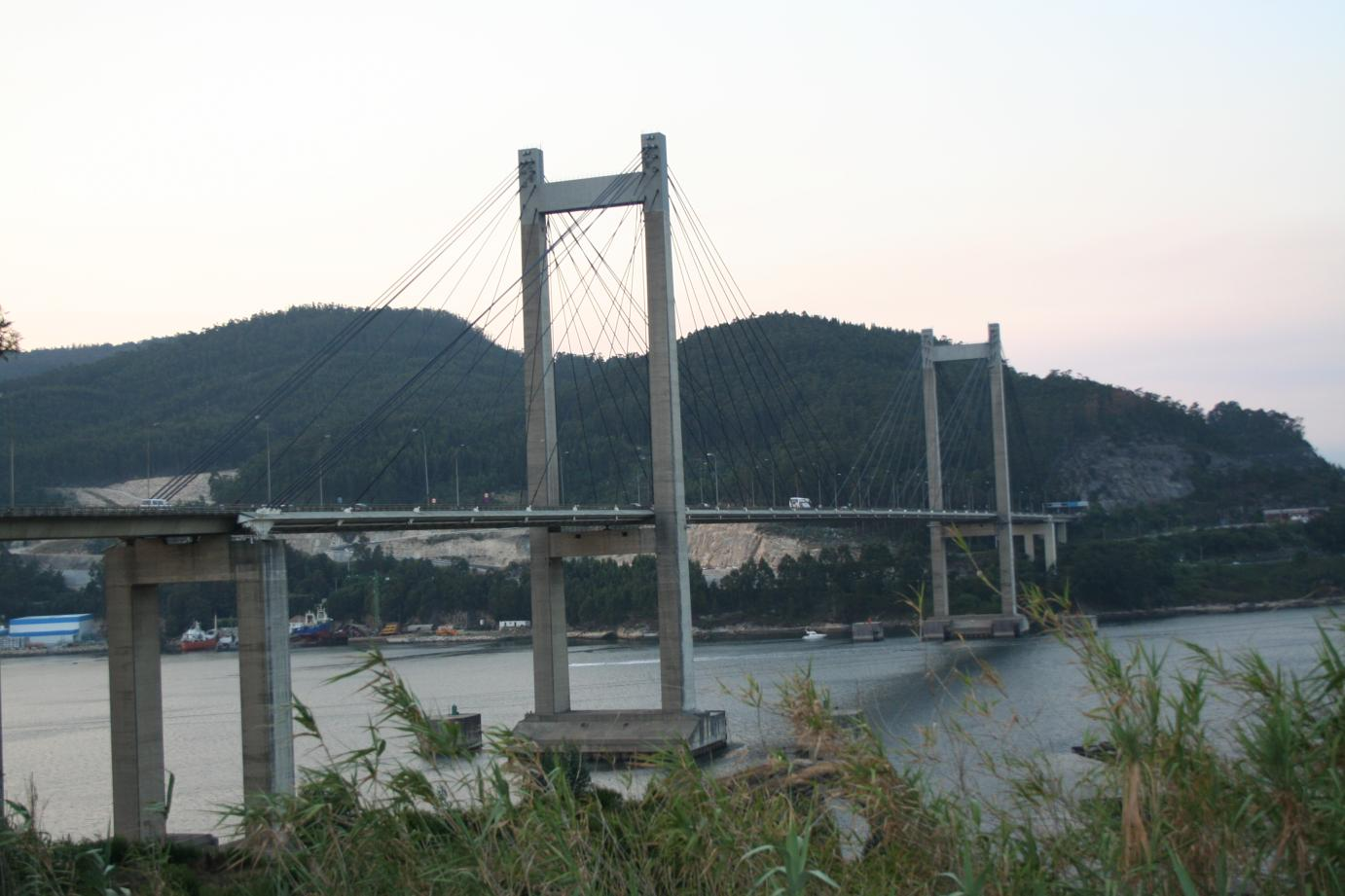
E1 near Vigo, Spain

The E1 has two sections in Spain. The northern section is between Ferrol and Tui at the Portuguese border. It follows the motorway AP-9, a.k.a. The Atlantic Axis, which connects the Galician cities of Ferrol, A Coruña, Santiago de Compostela, Pontevedra and Vigo, continuing south towards Tui. The E1 follows the motorway A-55 near the city of Tui to the Portuguese border at the river Minho.

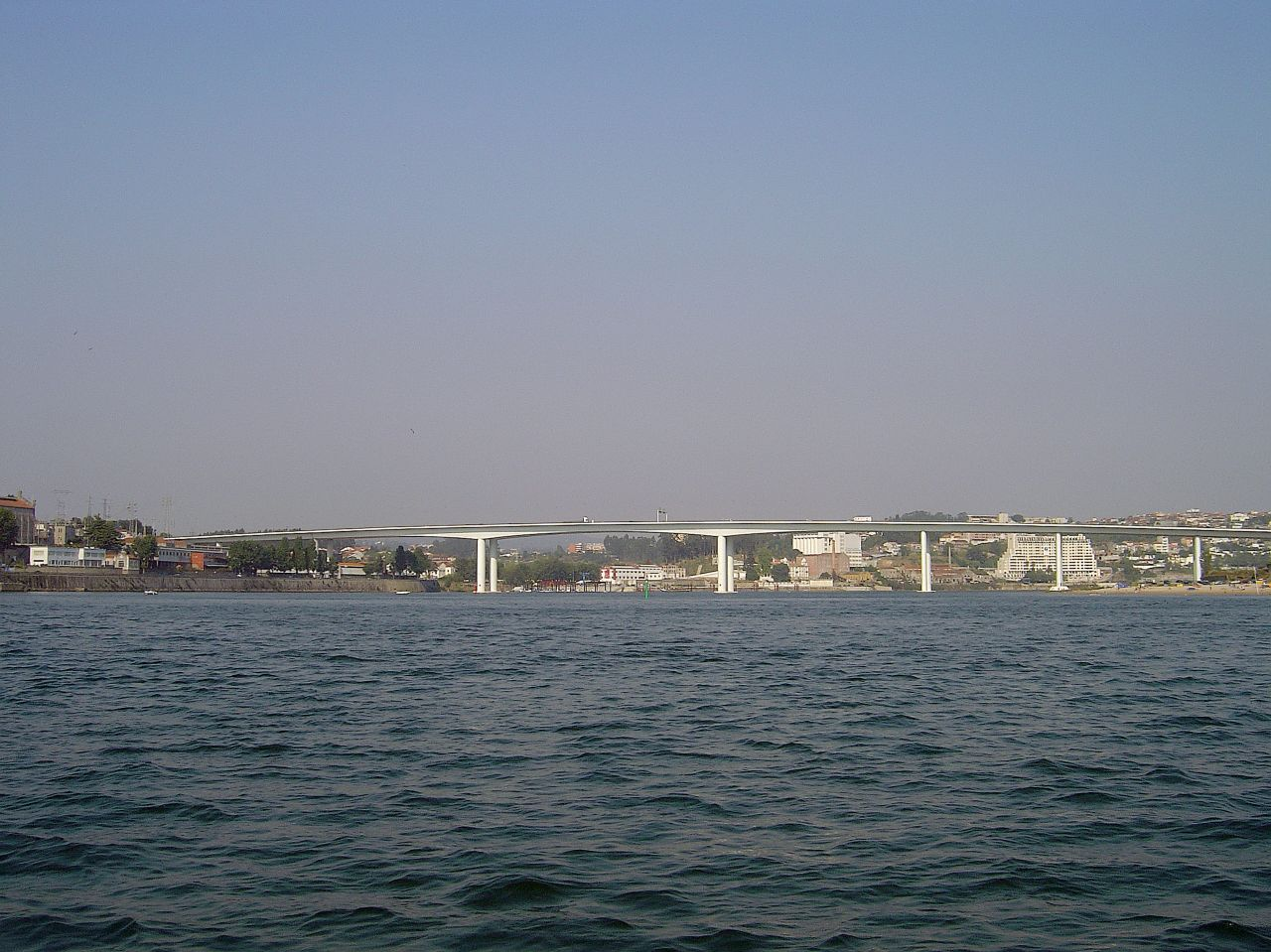
E1 passing at Ponte do Freixo, Porto.

In the section Aveiro Norte – Lisbon of the A1, the E1 follows the same route as the E80. In that section the E80 signage prevails over the E1 signage, the latter rarely appearing.

The second Spanish section is between Ayamonte at the Portuguese border and Seville. It follows the motorway A-49, and passes near the city of Huelva. The border is at the Guadiana river.

== Major junctions ==
Northern segment

United Kingdom
E18 in Larne
E16 in Newtownabbey. The highways travel concurrently to Belfast.
E18 in Lisburn
Ireland
E20 in Dublin. The highways travel concurrently to Tallaght.
E30 in Wexford
E30 in Rosslare

Southern segment

Spain
E70 in A Coruña
Portugal
E82 in Porto
E80 in Aveiro. The highways travel concurrently to Lisbon.
E801 in Coimbra
E90 in Lisbon. The highways travel concurrently to Setúbal.
Spain
E5 / E803 in Seville
