= A26 road (Northern Ireland) =

Road in Northern Ireland

Coordinates: 54.93503°N 6.32795°W

A26

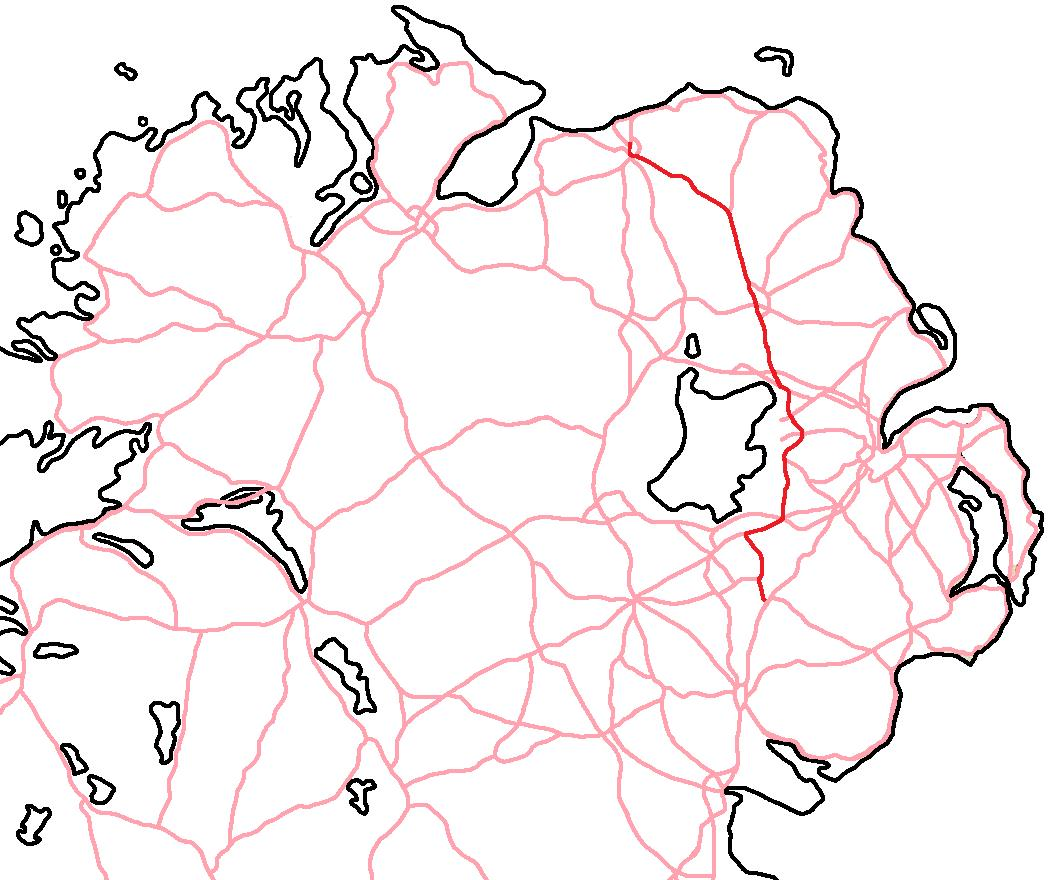
- The route of the A26 in red from Banbridge to Coleraine

Route information
- Length: 73 mi (117 km)

Major junctions
- North end: Coleraine
- South end: The Boulevard outlet, Banbridge

Location
- Country: United Kingdom
- Constituent country: Northern Ireland
- Primary destinations: Ballymoney; Ballymena; Antrim; Glenavy; Moira; Lurgan; Banbridge

Road network
- Roads in Northern Ireland; Motorways; A roads in Northern Ireland

The A26 is a road in Northern Ireland. It travels in a north–south direction from Coleraine, County Londonderry to Banbridge, County Down.

The road is a primary route between Coleraine and its junction with the M1, and a secondary route between Lurgan and Banbridge. Some sections of the road are dual carriageway, notably between Ballymena and the route's junction with the M2 and M22.

== Route ==
The A26 begins at the Lodge Road Roundabout on the outskirts of Coleraine, one of the junctions on the Coleraine ring road. A 1 km stretch of dual-carriageway, passing the Causeway Hospital, yields to single-carriageway after the Wattstown Roundabout towards Ballymoney. A further stretch of dual-carriageway is provided on the border of County Londonderry and County Antrim near Macfin, including the first of many crossings of the Belfast-Derry railway.

On reaching Ballymoney, the A26 route skirts past the town, and meets the B62 Ballybogy Road towards Portrush at a roundabout. Further junctions along the Ballymoney by-pass meet with the B66 to Dervock, the B147 to Stranocum, and the B16 to Armoy. The A26 continues, as the Frosses Road, in a south-east direction towards Ballymena, meeting the A44 from Ballycastle at a roundabout. This roundabout features regular accidents due to inappropriate camber travelling North from Ballymena towards Coleraine. 18,000 vehicles per day need to slow down excessively, wasting fuel.

From here, a new high quality dual-carriageway begins crossing the River Main near Glarryford. A section of the original route of the A26 progressed through a series of trees originally built on bogland. The "Frosses Trees" are a collection of Scots pines planted by Sir Charles Lanyon in 1839 as a means of preventing the road from subsiding. 50 of the trees were removed in 1999, and a further 26 of the trees were felled in July 2007, for safety reasons. This section is now bypassed on the new dual-carriageway with access to the original road maintained as rest areas.

The A26 continues towards Ballymena before drivers are offered to turn-off-to-stay-on the route, to continue into Ballymena town centre, or to by-pass the town via the M2. Traffic on the M2 then rejoins the A26 on its last roundabout junction, and the route continues to Antrim as dual-carriageway towards its junction with the M2 and M22. Original plans for Northern Ireland's motorway network had the M2 route running from its diverge with the M22 near Antrim and continuing past Ballymena towards Coleraine, but on the suspension of the Northern Ireland government in 1975, the M2 link between Antrim and Ballymena remained unbuilt. The A26 was re-routed under the unused bridges of the roundabout at Junction 10 at Ballymena, leading directly onto the M2 by-pass. The road works were completed in 2010.

Beyond its junction with the M2 and M22, the A26 continues as single carriageway into Antrim, passing The Junction, the first outlet centre opened in Northern Ireland and runs along the edge of Antrim town centre and onwards to a roundabout junction with the A57 route close to Belfast International Airport. Originally the A26 route continued directly ahead to the Aldergrove site, with a section passing the perimeter of the airport grounds, but the road was closed for security reasons. Until the early 1990s, all traffic was diverted through the small village of Killead, but a by-pass relieved the village from traffic heading north to the Airport in the 1990s.

The A26 then reaches another aviation-related landmark at a roundabout, the site of the former RAF Nutts Corner base. Traffic following the A26 takes a turn to the right, and continues, by-passing the villages of Crumlin, County Antrim, Glenavy and Upper Ballinderry, crossing the currently disused Lisburn–Antrim railway near the latter. The A26 then goes under the Belfast-Dublin railway and then meets the M1 at its junction with the A3 road, and multiplexes with the A3 through the villages of Moira and Magheralin.

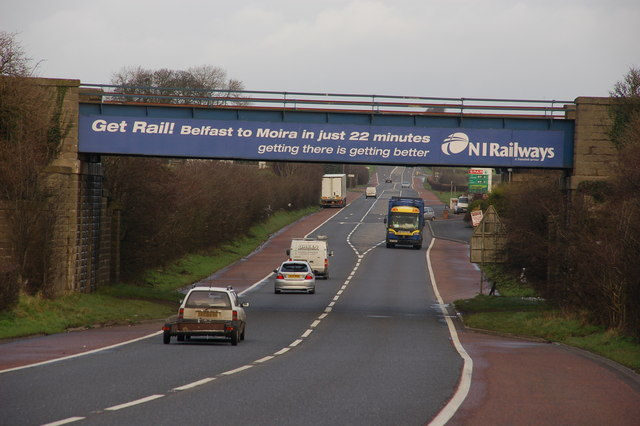
The rail alternative from Moira to Belfast (Lanyon Place) on NI Railways.

The A26 branches off from the A3 again on entering Lurgan, and follows a south-eastern route to Banbridge. The route passes through the villages of Waringstown before meeting the A50 from Gilford and Portadown at a roundabout. The A26 then multiplexes with the A50 through the village of Seapatrick on its way into Banbridge town centre. The route splits into two spurs in Banbridge, both ending at the A1, with one carrying traffic north out of the town centre towards Belfast, Lisburn and Dromore, and the other carrying traffic south towards Newry and Dublin. The A50 leaves the A26 in the town centre and travels southeast towards Castlewellan and Newcastle.

== Planned developments ==
At present, the Department for Regional Development plan a series of future road schemes for the A26:

- Completion of dualling between Ballymoney and Coleraine.
- The conversion of the stretch from Nutts Corner to M1 Junction 9 to "2+1" road.
