= Whiteabbey =

Whiteabbey Irish: An Mhainistir Fhionn
- Townland
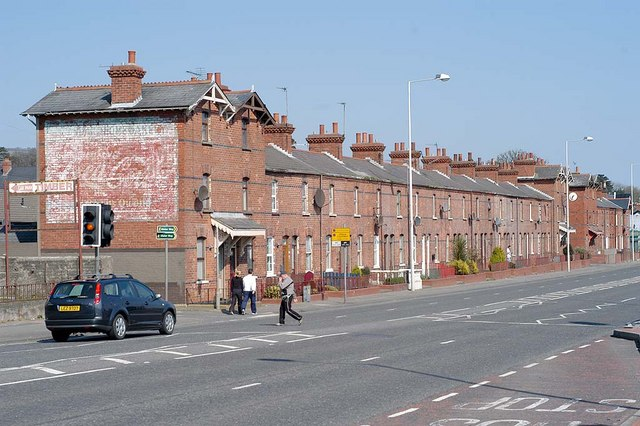
- A row of houses on the Shore Road, Whiteabbey

- Whiteabbey shown within Northern Ireland Whiteabbey (the United Kingdom)
- Coordinates: 54°40′27″N 5°53′58″W
- Sovereign state: United Kingdom
- Country: Northern Ireland
- County: Antrim
- Barony: Belfast Lower
- Civil parish: Carnmoney
- Settlements: Newtownabbey

Government
  - Council: Antrim and Newtownabbey Borough Council

Area
  - Total: 370.8 acres (150.05 ha)

Whiteabbey is a townland (of 406 acres) in Newtownabbey, north of Belfast in County Antrim, Northern Ireland.

The original village of Whiteabbey stood at the foot of the Three Mile Water, on the shore of Belfast Lough. In 1958, it and six other villages were joined to form the new district of Newtownabbey. Whiteabbey is part of the civil parish of Carnmoney and the historic barony of Belfast Lower.

== History ==
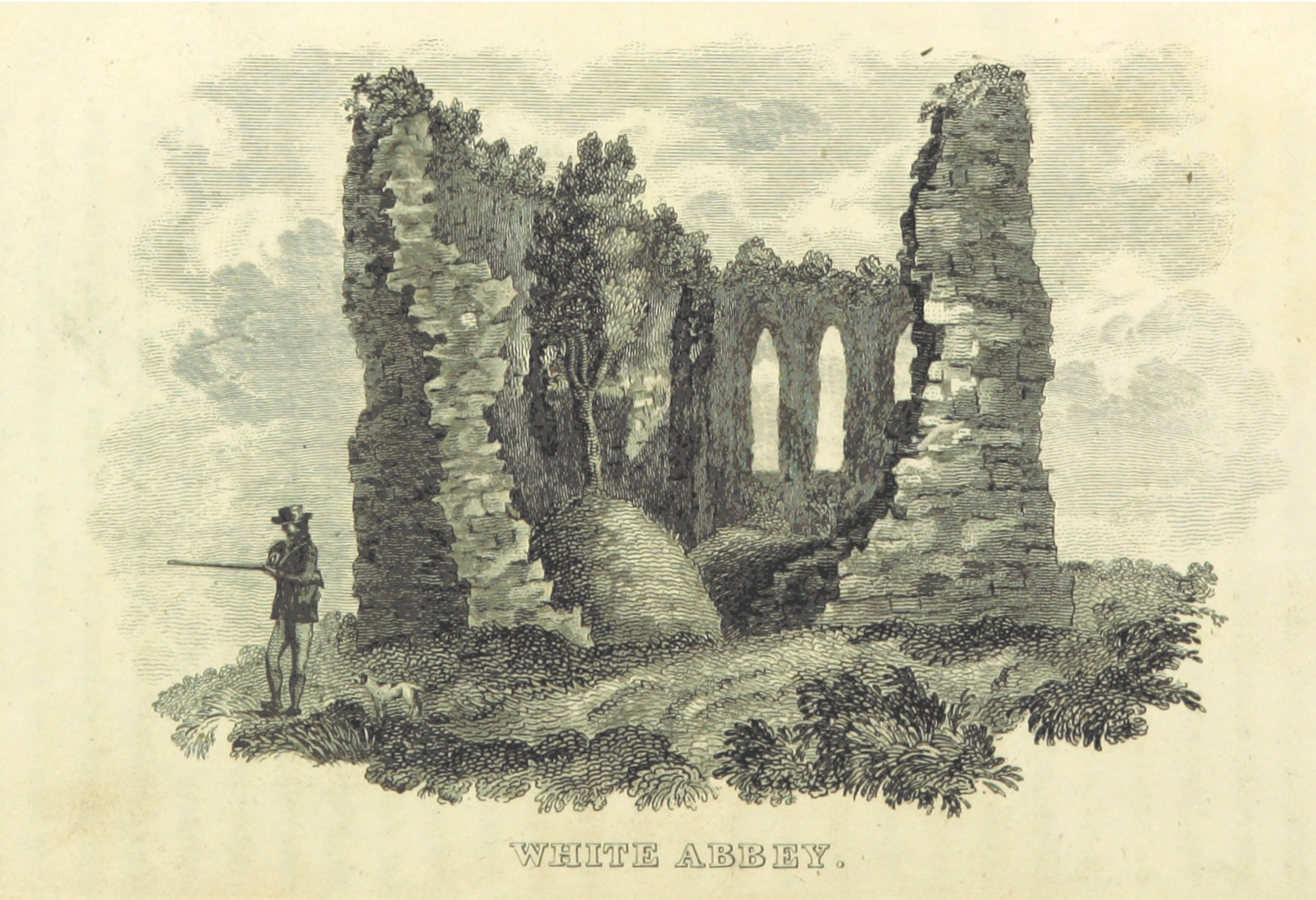
The ruins of the White Abbey, which gave the village its name

Whiteabbey took its name from the medieval abbey of Druim La Croix, which stood near present-day Whiteabbey Hospital. The abbey was a daughter house of Dryburgh Abbey in Scotland and belonged to the Premonstratensian Order, who were popularly known as the White Canons. Parts of the ruined chapter house remained visible until the 20th century, but the last traces of the building were removed in 1926.

In the first half of the 19th century, the village of Whiteabbey was home to a large bleach works, and was an important landing site for coal shipments bound for Belfast. Remnants of the old pier can still be seen in Belfast Lough. The importance of Whiteabbey declined after the channel into Belfast Harbour was widened and straightened, allowing larger ships to reach the city directly.

Abbeylands, a Victorian house in Whiteabbey belonging to Sir Hugh McCalmont, was used as a training ground by the Ulster Volunteers during the Home Rule Crisis. In 1914, the building was torched by Suffragettes in response to Edward Carson's opposition to votes for women, causing £20,000 of damage.

In 1952, one of Northern Ireland's most controversial murders took place in Whiteabbey when Patricia Curran, the 19-year-old daughter of prominent judge and politician Sir Lancelot Curran, was found stabbed near her home, Glen House.

Whiteabbey, together with Whitewell, Whitehouse, Jordanstown, Monkstown, Carnmoney, and Glengormley, were the seven villages that formed Newtownabbey when it gained district council status on 1 April 1958.

== Amenities ==
The Glen, which follows the Three Mile Water up to the Bleach Green railway viaducts, is a local walking route.

Whiteabbey is close to the main shopping area of Newtownabbey, including the Abbey Centre. Whiteabbey Hospital is also located near the village.

== Education ==
- Northern Regional College – Newtownabbey campus
- Whiteabbey Primary School founded in 1839, by the congregation of Whiteabbey Presbyterian Church, it was originally located in their church grounds on the Shore Road. In 1939 the school moved to Old Manse Road and became a Public Elementary School and now a government Controlled School accepting children of all cultural and religious backgrounds.
- St. James's Primary School
- King's Park Primary School
- Rosstulla Special School
- Thornfield House School

== Local churches ==
- Whiteabbey Congregational Church
- Whiteabbey Presbyterian Church
- Whiteabbey Methodist Church
- Saint James Catholic Church
- The Church of Jesus Christ of Latter-day Saints, Newtownabbey

== Transport ==
The area is served by Whiteabbey railway station on the Belfast to Larne line. The station opened in April 1848. Although it lies outside Belfast, the area is also served by the Translink Metro service.

== See also ==
- List of townlands in County Antrim
