= Roads in Northern Ireland =

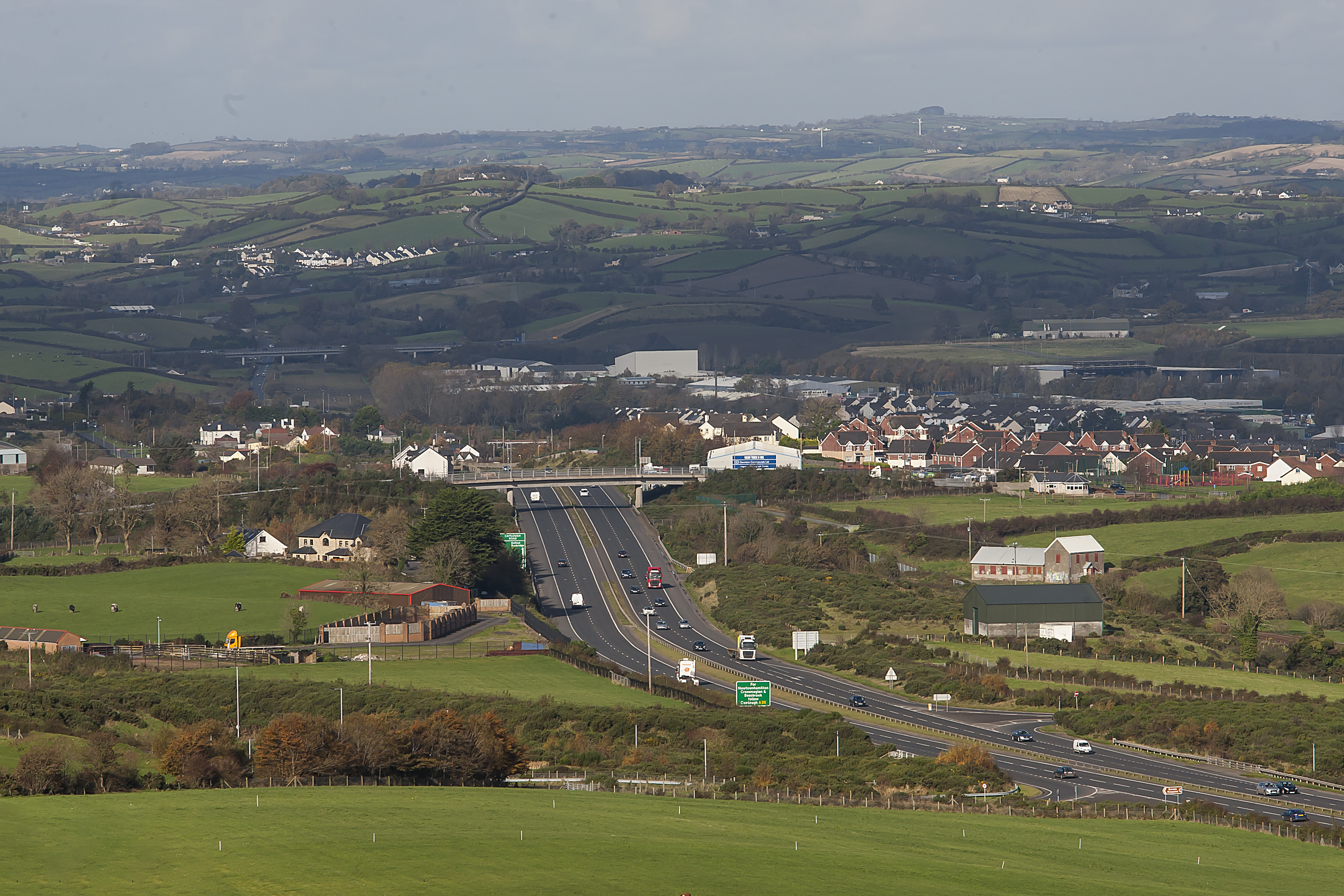
A1 near Newry

The main roads in Northern Ireland are signed "M"/"A"/"B" as in Great Britain. Whereas the roads in Great Britain are numbered according to a zonal system, there is no available explanation for the allocation of road numbers in Northern Ireland, though their numbering is separate from the system in England, Scotland and Wales.

In Northern Ireland, DfI Roads is responsible for all 25,792 kilometres (16,026 mi) of roads. Road users also have the Highway Code for Northern Ireland, which provides guidance on the legal aspects of driving on Northern Ireland's roads.

== Motorways ==
The most important roads are motorways, designated by the letter "M". The motorway network is focused on Belfast. Legal authority for motorways existed in the Special Roads Act (Northern Ireland) 1963 (c. 12 (N.I.)) similar to that in the Special Roads Act 1949 in Great Britain. The first motorway to open was the M1 motorway, though it did so under temporary powers until the Special Roads Act (Northern Ireland) 1963 had been passed. Work on the motorways continued until the 1970s when the oil crisis and The Troubles both intervened causing the abandonment of many schemes. The M3 was the final motorway scheme in Northern Ireland and the United Kingdom in its entirety to open.

Link	Route	Notes
M1	Belfast to Dungannon	Via Lisburn and Craigavon, in the direction of Sligo, Enniskillen and Omagh. The motorway forms the main Dublin–Belfast route until Sprucefield.
M2	Belfast to Antrim as well as the Ballymena Bypass	In two sections built at different stages, one linking Belfast to Antrim, and the other bypassing Ballymena. The section in between was planned, but never built. Main route out of Belfast to Derry, Coleraine and Larne.
M3	Lagan Bridge	Linking the M2 in north Belfast to the A2 Sydenham Bypass in the east of the city.
M5	Linking the M2 in north Belfast to Newtownabbey	Forms part of the Belfast–Carrickfergus route.
A8(M)	M2 to Ballyhenry.	A spur from the M2 at Sandyknowes near Glengormley to Corr's Corner Roadabout on the A8 north-west of Newtownabbey. Forms part of the Belfast–Larne route.
M12	M1 to Craigavon	A spur from the M1 near Derrymacash to the centre of Craigavon.
M22	Antrim to Randalstown	Linking the M2 at Antrim to Randalstown. Forms part of the main road between Belfast and Derry.

== "A" roads ==
The next most important roads are designated with the prefix "A" and a one-, two- or three-digit number.

== "B" roads ==
Less important roads are indicated with the prefix "B" and a one-, two- or three- digit number.

== "C" roads ==
Minor roads can be indicated with the prefix "C" and a one-, two- or three- digit number, though it is very rare to see these marked on signposts or Ordnance Survey maps

== Euro Routes ==
Though unsignposted, the following Euro Routes include sections of roads in Northern Ireland:

- E01 – Larne – Belfast – Dublin – Rosslare – A Coruña – Pontevedra – Valença do Minho – Vila Real de Santo António – Huelva – Sevilla
- E16 – Derry – Belfast ... Glasgow – Edinburgh ... Bergen – Arna – Voss ... Lærdalsøyri – Tyin – Fagernes – Hønefoss – Sandvika – Oslo
- E18 – Craigavon – Belfast – Larne ... Stranraer – Gretna – Carlisle – Newcastle ... Kristiansand – Arendal – Porsgrunn – Larvik – Sandefjord – Horten – Drammen – Oslo – Askim – Karlstad – Örebro – Västerås – Stockholm/Kapellskär ... Mariehamn ... Turku/Naantali – Helsinki – Kotka – Vaalimaa – Vyborg – Saint Petersburg

== See also ==
- Roads in the United Kingdom
- Roads in the Republic of Ireland
- Local roads in Ireland
- History of roads in Ireland
- Northern Irish Vehicle Registration Plates
- Transport in Ireland
