= M2 motorway (Northern Ireland) =

Motorway in Northern Ireland

M2
- M2 highlighted in blue
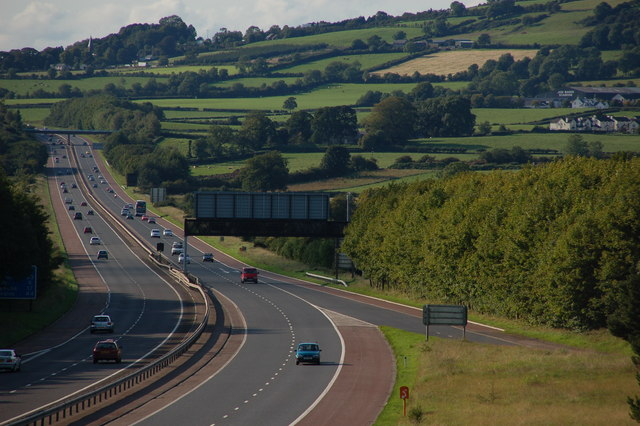
- Looking west at Templepatrick, 2006

Route information
- Part of E01, E16 and E18
- Length: 22.0 mi (35.4 km)
- Existed: 1969–present
- History: Southern section constructed 1969–1975

Southern section
- Length: 16.5 mi (26.6 km)
- North end: Duncairn
- Major intersections: M3 Motorway M5 Motorway M22 motorway
- South end: Antrim

Northern section
- Length: 6.0 mi (9.7 km)
- North end: Teeshan
- South end: Ballycregy

Location
- Country: United Kingdom
- Constituent country: Northern Ireland
- Primary destinations: Ballymena, Belfast Ballymoney, Antrim, Belfast

Road network
- Roads in Northern Ireland; Motorways; A roads in Northern Ireland

The M2 is a motorway in Belfast and County Antrim in Northern Ireland. It is in two sections, the southern section running from north Belfast to Antrim and the northern section acts as a bypass of Ballymena, with the A26 road linking the two sections. In total it is 22 miles (36.2 kilometres). The M2 has the busiest sections of any road or motorway in Northern Ireland. The M2 is one of Northern Ireland's most important motorways, forming most of the main route from Belfast city to both Belfast International Airport and less than a quarter of the way to Derry. It forms part of the unsigned European route E01, E16 and E18 roads.

== Route ==
=== Southern section ===
The route starts at as a continuation of the M3 to the west of the River Lagan at Duncairn. It strikes north past the docks and to the east of Fortwilliam before turning west on slip roads at Junction 2. It now runs through the northern suburbs of Belfast past Whitewell and enters the hill section as it climbs at a gradient of up to 1 in 15, one of the steepest in the United Kingdom. It then passes south of Glengormley before leaving the city behind at Ballyvesy. Entering the countryside, it runs parallel to Ballymartin Water before reaching Junction 5 north of Templepatrick, then crosses Six Mile Water before arriving to the north of Burnside at Junction 6. Running around the north of Antrim, shortly after Junction 7 the road meets an incomplete junction where the motorway would have continued to Ballymena. When the road widens, it becomes the M22.

=== Northern section ===
The route begins to the south east of Ballymena at Ballycregy as a continuation of the A26 and heads north under the roundabout at junction 10. Running east of Crebilly it crosses the River Braid and turns more north west to the west of Rabbit Hill passes south of Killyflugh, passes east of Leymore and terminates on the A26 by Teeshan. The unbuilt Junction 8 was for Kells and Connor and Junction 9 for a future Ballymena southern bypass.

== History ==
A route roughly along the line of the M2 had been planned since the 1930s, but the first concrete plans for the North Approach were announced in 1946. In 1956 proposals for several motorways, including the M2, were announced with the M2 running directly to Ballymena. Part of this alignment became the A8(M). In 1964 the plans were further extended to route the M2 via Antrim to Coleraine, away from its original direct alignment over difficult terrain, which is how the plans for construction were then progressed. The A8(M) was already under construction, so it was left as a spur.

Due to financial restraints, it was decided to prioritise the sections of the road required urgently, with the first stage being started on 2 September 1963. Construction continued until 1975, with the road being opened in the following sections:

- Junctions 1 to 2 opened in 1973
- Junctions 2 to 4 opened in 1966
- Junctions 4 to 5 opened in 1975
- Junctions 5 to M22 opened in 1971
- Junctions 10 to 12 opened in 1969

In 1993 Junction 7 was opened to provide access to Antrim Area Hospital.

The section between Junctions 7 and 10 was to be the next section constructed, but with the onset of The Troubles and then direct rule, nearly all the planned motorway projects were cancelled. The A26 between M22 Junction 1 and Junction 10 of the M2 was progressively upgraded to a dual carriageway and so it is now unlikely that the M2 will ever be completed.

The section between Junctions 1A and 2 is ten lanes (five lanes and two full-width shoulders each way) and, when it was opened, was the widest motorway in the United Kingdom.

== Junctions ==
=== Southern section ===
M2 motorway
Southeastbound exits	Junction	Northwestbound exits
End of M2; Motorway carries on as M3; Belfast (W), The WEST, The SOUTH A12 (M1); Belfast (E), Newcastle, City Airport, Bangor M3	1A	Start of motorway
Docks, City Centre A2	1B	No access
Fortwilliam, Docks (N), Stena Line, Shore Road (A2)	1	Fortwilliam, Docks (N), Stena Line, Shore Road (A2)
Greenisland, Carrickfergus A2	2	Whiteabbey, Carrickfergus M5; Greenisland, Rathcoole, Whitewell A2
A6 Larne A8(M) Glengormley	4	A6 Larne A8(M) Glengormley
Larne (A8), Ballyclare, Templepatrick A57	5	International Airport Templepatrick, Ballyclare A57
Antrim B95	6	Antrim B95
Antrim Area Hospital	7	Antrim Area Hospital
End of M22 - Motorway carries on as M2	M22, J1	Motorway carries on as M22; Derry, Cookstown M22; Antrim, Ballymena, Coleraine A26

==== Notes ====
- Junction 1B is the only motorway junction in the United Kingdom that consists solely of motorway exits, with no entry slip-roads
- There is no Junction 3, it was planned to be located on the Antrim Road

=== Northern section ===
M2 motorway
Southbound exits	Junction	Northbound exits
End of motorway A26 dual carriageway continues International Airport Belfast, Antrim A26; Ballymena, Larne A36	10	Start of motorway
Ballymena, Broughshane A42 Cushendall (A43)	11	Ballymena, Broughshane A42
Start of motorway	12	End of motorway A26 dual carriageway continues Coleraine A26 Ballycastle (A44) Ballymena

== Motorway service areas ==
Petrogas opened a Motorway service area in April 2015 off the northbound carriageway between the Glengormley and Templepatrick junctions. Branded "Applegreen" the service area contains food franchises including Burger King. A second service area is under construction off the southbound carriageway.

== Plans ==
=== Southern section ===
- In April 2008 a plan was approved to construct a flyover enabling a direct link between the M2 and A12 Westlink, to be completed between 2013 and 2018.As of 2025, this development is still in its planning stage.

== See also ==
- M22 motorway (Northern Ireland)
- List of motorways in the United Kingdom
- Roads in Ireland
- Belfast-Derry railway line
