= A50 road (Northern Ireland) =

Road in Northern Ireland

Coordinates: 54.3202°N 6.1671°W

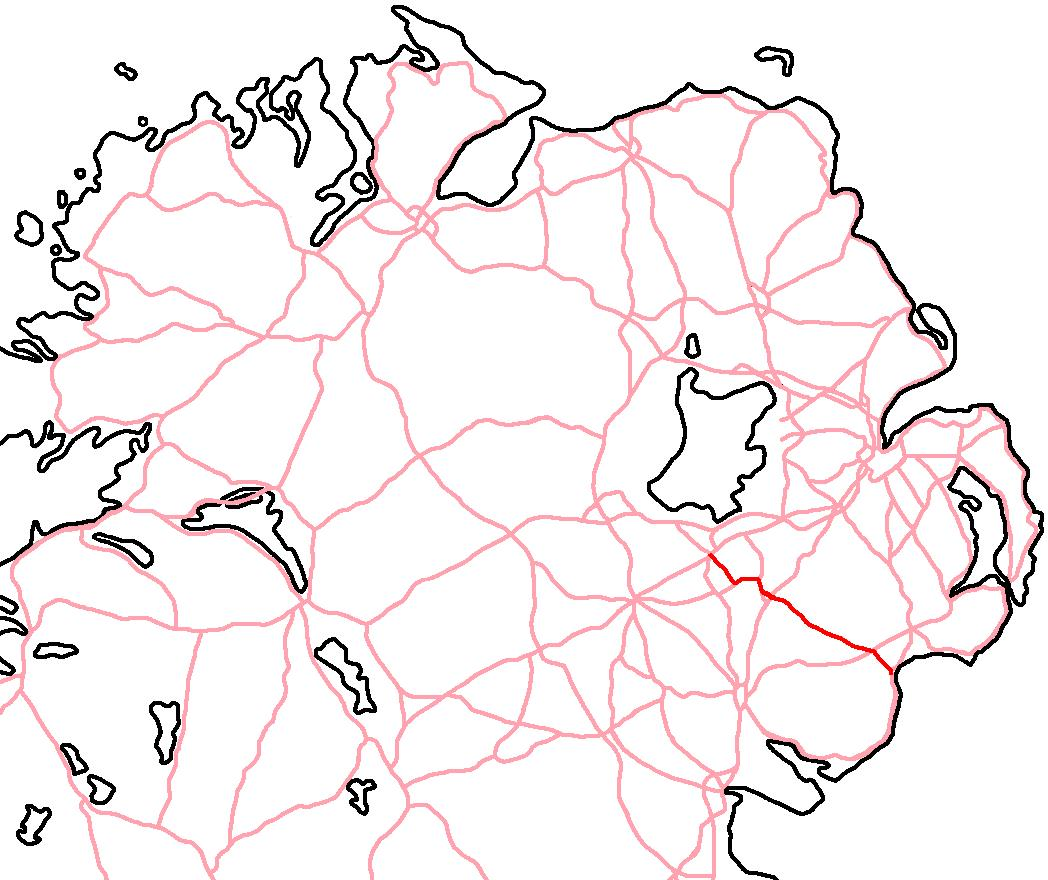
The route of the A50 in red from Portadown (Co. Armagh) to Newcastle (Co. Down)

The A50 is a road in counties Armagh and Down in Northern Ireland. It starts in the town of Portadown and continues through Gilford, Lawrencetown, Banbridge, Katebridge, Moneyslane, Ballyward and Castlewellan, before arriving in the seaside town of Newcastle on the Irish Sea, located at the foot of Slieve Donard.

The road has a graded junction with the main Dublin-Belfast A1 dual carriageway to the southeast of Banbridge. The section between Portadown and Katesbridge vaguely follows the course of the River Bann from its source in the Mourne Mountains, against the current.
