= M3 motorway (Northern Ireland) =

Motorway in Northern Ireland

M3
- M3 highlighted in blue

Route information
- Length: 0.8 mi (1,300 m)
- Existed: 1995–present
- History: Constructed 1995–1998

Major junctions
- West end: M2
- City centre
- East end: A2 Sydenham Bypass

Location
- Country: United Kingdom
- Constituent country: Northern Ireland
- Primary destinations: Bangor, Belfast

Road network
- Roads in Northern Ireland; Motorways; A roads in Northern Ireland
← M2	→ A2

The M3 is a 0.8-mile-long (1.3 km) urban motorway that connects the M2 in north Belfast, Northern Ireland to the A2 Sydenham Bypass in east Belfast. It is the shortest motorway in Northern Ireland, and one of the busiest, carrying 60,000 vehicles per day as of 2005. It has a permanent speed limit of 50 mph (80 km/h).

== History ==
The M3 was originally planned in 1956 as the Eastern Approach, named the M3 the following year, which would run from east Belfast to Bangor. The plan was extended to include an orbital Belfast Urban Motorway, close to the city centre, in 1964. Due to a combination of financial cutbacks and public opposition construction of the M3 never took place and the Belfast Urban Motorway was downgraded to the A12 Westlink dual-carriageway and only partially completed. Traffic had to make do with crossing the River Lagan on the Queen's Bridge and using the A2 to Bangor.

In 1987 the government announced a plan to build a new bridge across the Lagan connecting the M2 directly to the A2. It was built in two stages: the Lagan Bridge section connecting to the M2 opened on 22 January 1995 while the link to the A2 opened three years later in May 1998. The route was designated as the M3, although it is not the same scheme as the one originally expected to be the M3. Construction of this road was unusual as government policy was against the construction of new urban motorways.

== Junctions ==
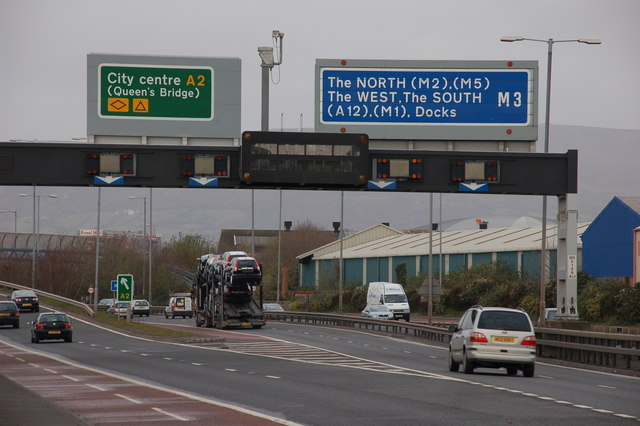
The M3 from the Sydenham Bypass, 2007

M3 motorway
Eastbound exits	Junction	Westbound exits
End of motorway M2 motorway continues M2 The NORTH, Docks (N), International Airport; A12 The WEST, The SOUTH, Docks (S)	1a	Start of motorway
Lagan Bridge
Start of motorway	1	End of motorway A2 dual carriageway continues City Airport Bangor, Newtownards A2; Titanic Quarter, Belfast (E), Newcastle

== M3 Lagan Bridge ==
The M3 crosses the River Lagan on a 160m-long, 37m-wide arched concrete bridge. This bridge is actually two separate, parallel spans, made of pre-cast segments.

Next crossing upstream	River Lagan	Next crossing downstream
Dargan Bridge	M3 Lagan Bridge	None

== See also ==
- Roads in Ireland
- List of motorways in the United Kingdom
