= Mallusk, County Antrim =

Village in County Antrim, Northern Ireland

Coordinates: 54.679778°N 6.004058°W

Grange of Mallusk: Irish: Maigh Bhloisce; Mallusk
- Village
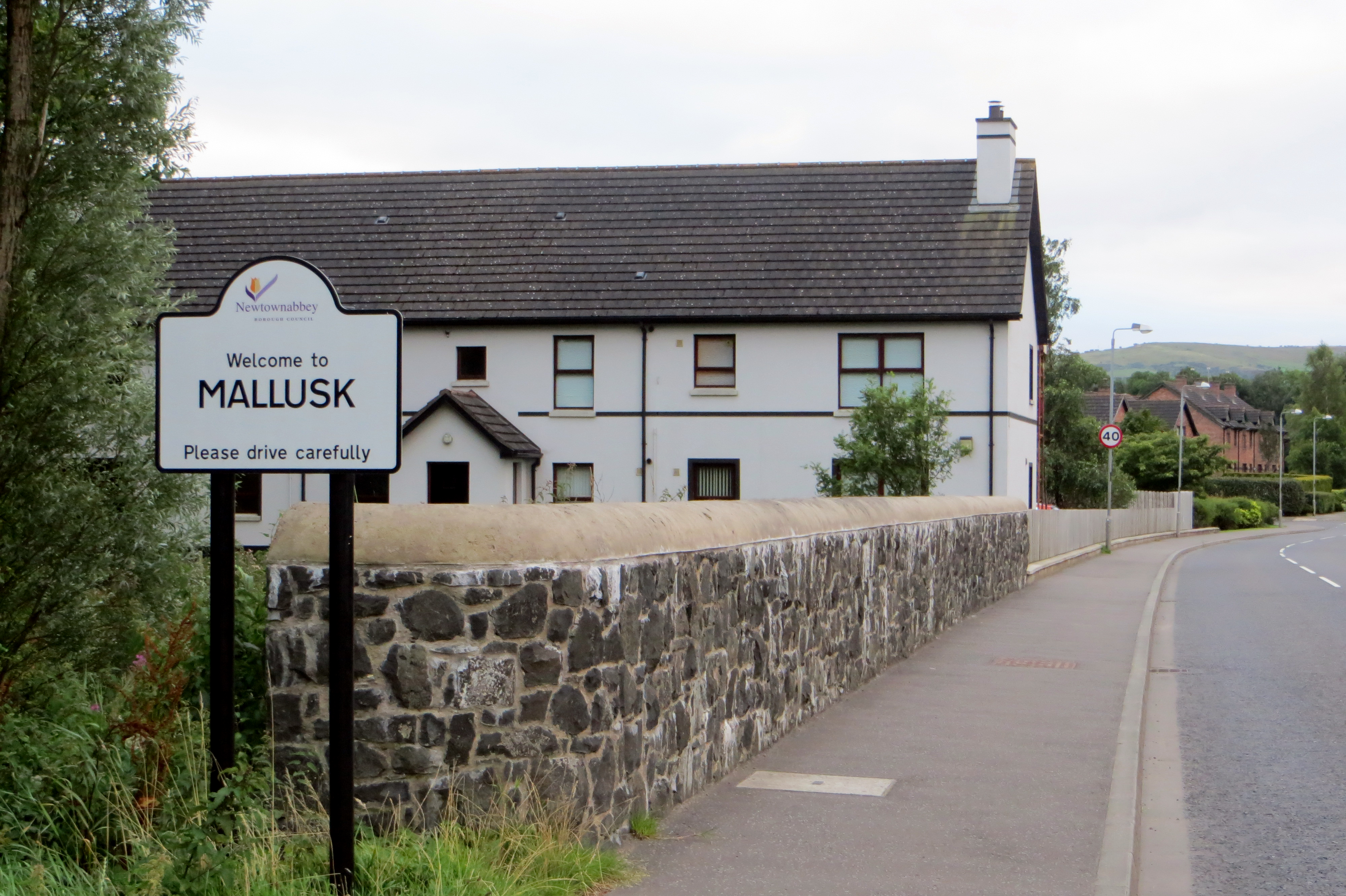
- Welcome signage at Mallusk

- Location within Northern Ireland
- District: Newtownabbey
- County: County Antrim
- Country: Northern Ireland
- Sovereign state: United Kingdom
- Post town: NEWTOWNABBEY
- Postcode district: BT36
- Dialling code: 028
- UK Parliament: south Antrim
- NI Assembly: South Antrim

Mallusk, or Grange of Mallusk, is a large village and townland (of 933 acres (378 ha)) in County Antrim, Northern Ireland. Mallusk is within the urban area of Newtownabbey, and it is also within the Antrim and Newtownabbey Borough Council area. It is situated in the civil parish of Templepatrick and the historic barony of Belfast Lower.

== Amenities ==
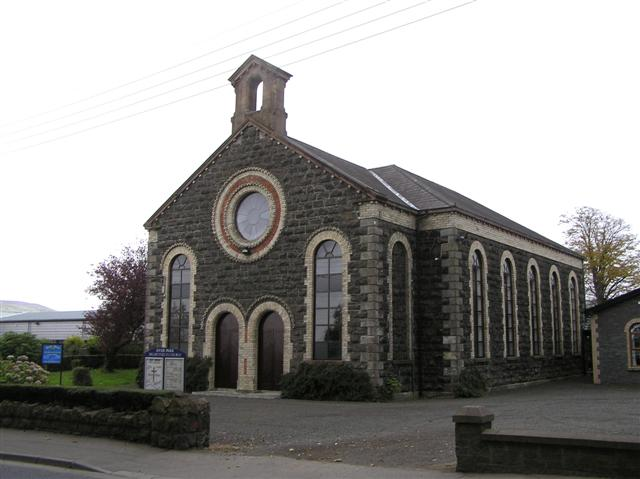
Hydepark Presbyterian Church, Mallusk Road

Churches in the area include Hydepark Presbyterian Church and The People's Church, Newtownabbey.

The local primary school, Mallusk Integrated Primary School, is located on Mallusk Road.

The City of Belfast Playing Fields are located in Mallusk.

== Economy ==
Diageo bottles Bailey's Irish Cream at a £41m plant, built in Mallusk around 2004.

== Transport ==
Despite being outside of Belfast, Mallusk is served by bus routes 1E and 1F of Translink Metro and Translink Ulsterbus route 120. These buses run from Roughfort via Belfast City Centre.
