= Newtownabbey =

Settlement near Belfast, Northern Ireland

Coordinates: 54°40′24″N 05°54′49″W

Newtownabbey: Irish: Baile na Mainistreach
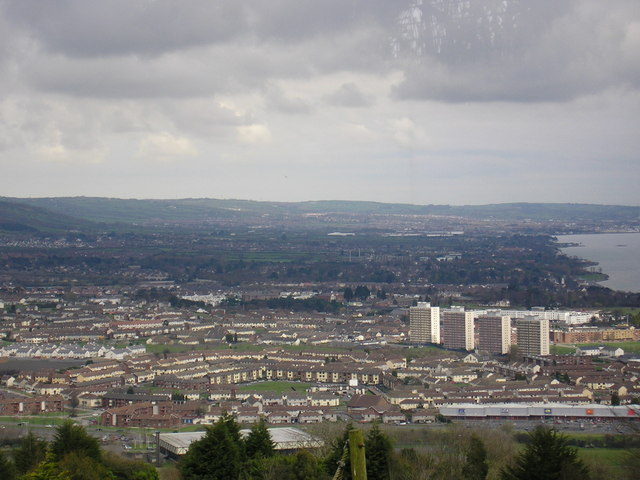
- Overlooking the Rathcoole area of Newtownabbey from Cavehill

- Location within Northern Ireland
- Population: 67,599 (2021 census)
- District: Antrim and Newtownabbey
- County: County Antrim
- Country: Northern Ireland
- Sovereign state: United Kingdom
- Post town: NEWTOWNABBEY
- Postcode district: BT36, BT37
- Dialling code: 028
- Police: Northern Ireland
- Fire: Northern Ireland
- Ambulance: Northern Ireland
- UK Parliament: East Antrim
- NI Assembly: East Antrim

Newtownabbey is a large settlement north of Belfast city centre in County Antrim, Northern Ireland. It is separated from the rest of the city by Cavehill and Fortwilliam golf course, but it still forms part of the Belfast metropolitan area. It surrounds Carnmoney Hill, and was formed from the merging of several small villages including Whiteabbey, Glengormley and Carnmoney. At the 2021 census, Metropolitan Newtownabbey Settlement had a population of 67,599, making it the third largest settlement in Northern Ireland and seventh on the Island of Ireland. It is part of Antrim and Newtownabbey Borough Council.

== History ==
=== Founding ===
Newtownabbey Urban District was founded on 1 April 1958 to cover seven villages north of Belfast: Carnmoney, Glengormley, Jordanstown, Monkstown, Whiteabbey, Whitehouse and Whitewell. Before this, the area fell under the jurisdiction of Belfast Rural District.

Newtownabbey Urban District Council was succeeded by Newtownabbey District Council (1973–1977), Newtownabbey Borough Council (1977–2015), and Antrim and Newtownabbey District Council (2015 onwards).

=== The Troubles ===
During The Troubles, there were a number of incidents in Newtownabbey, including several gun attacks involving the UFF and UVF.

== Geography ==
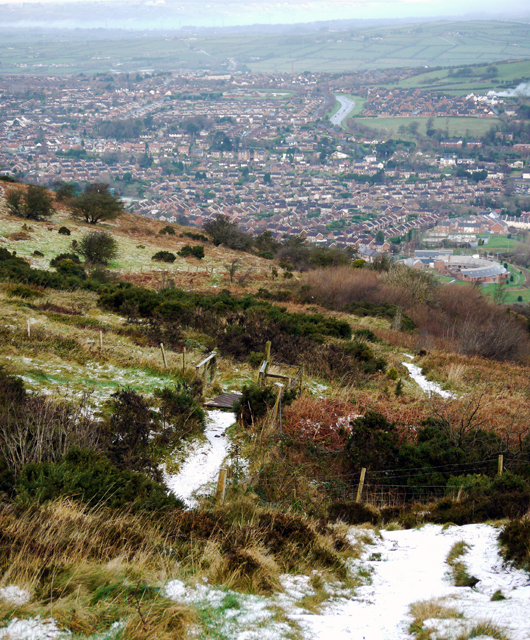
The Glengormley area of Newtownabbey from Cavehill

Newtownabbey is a large dispersed urban area north of Belfast, surrounding Carnmoney Hill. To its east is Belfast Lough, and to its south and west is Cavehill. There are two wooded river glens running through it: the Three Mile Water and the Glas-na-Bradan.

=== Townlands ===
Below is a list of townlands that are within Newtownabbey's urban area, alongside their likely etymologies.

- Ballybought (from Irish Baile Bocht, meaning 'poor townland')*
- Ballyduff (from Baile Mhic Giolla Dhuibh, "MacElduff's townland")*
- Ballygolan (from Baile an Ghabhláin, "townland of the fork")*
- Ballyhenry (from Baile Éinrí, "Henry's townland")*
- Ballyvesey (possibly from Baile an Mheasa, "townland of the mast)*
- Ballywonard (from Baile an Mhuine Aird, "townland of the high thicket")*
- Carnmoney
- Collinward (formerly Ballygorinward, possibly from Baile Gorán Bhaird, "townland of the bard's grove")*
- Croghfern (formerly Curraghfarny, possibly from Currach Fearnaí, "marsh of the place of alders")*
- Drumnadrough (from Droim na gCruach, "ridge of the stacks")*, site of Merville Garden Village
- Dunanney (from Dún Áine, "Áine's fort")*
- Glengormley
- Jordanstown
- Mallusk
- Monkstown
- Whiteabbey
- Whitehouse (named after a 16th-century fortified house built by an English adventurer; formerly Ballyrintollard)*

Other districts include:

- Mossley (named after Mossley, England; in Ballyhenry townland)
- Rathcoole
- Whitewell (named after a former spring; in Ballygolan townland)

* citation for derivations

== Demography ==
National Identity of Newtownabbey residents (2021)
Nationality	Per cent
British	55.9%
Northern Irish	35.6%
Irish	21.5%

=== 2021 Census ===
On census day in 2021, there were 67,599 people living in Newtownabbey. Of these:

- 54.45% (36,806) were from a Protestant or other Christian backgrounds, 30.77% (20,801) were from a Catholic background, 1.73% (1,171) were from other religious backgrounds, and 13.05% (8,821) had no religious background
- 7.57% had some knowledge of the Irish language and 9.21% had some knowledge of Ulster-Scots.
- 41.37% (27,966) had a British only identity, 17.25% (11,662) had an Irish only identity, and 20.61% (13,934) had a Northern Irish only identity.

=== 2011 Census ===
On census day in 2011 (27 March 2011), there were 65,646 people living in Newtownabbey. Of these:

- 20.26% were aged under 16 years and 15.51% were aged 60 and over
- 48.02% of the population were male and 51.98% were female
- 62.21% were from a Protestant or other Christian backgrounds, and 27.69% were from a Catholic background
- 6.40% had some knowledge of the Irish language and 6.98% had some knowledge of Ulster-Scots.

== Education ==
Higher-level education

- Northern Regional College (NRC)
- Ulster University at Jordanstown (UUJ)

Secondary-level education

- Abbey Community College
- Belfast High School
- Edmund Rice College
- Glengormley High School

Primary-level education

- St. Mary's on the Hill Primary School
- Ashgrove Primary School
- Carnmoney Primary School
- Hollybank Primary School
- Jordanstown Schools for the Deaf and Blind
- King's Park Primary School
- Rathcoole Primary School
- St. Bernard's Primary School
- St. MacNissi's Primary School
- Whitehouse Primary School
- Gaelscoil Éanna

== Sport ==
There are several association football clubs in Newtownabbey, including several amateur clubs which field teams in the Northern Amateur Football League: 4th Newtownabbey F.C., 18th Newtownabbey Old Boys F.C., Mossley F.C., Nortel F.C., Rathfern Rangers F.C., and Ulster University at Jordanstown F.C. Rathcoole F.C. plays in the Ballymena & Provincial Football League. As of 2020, Belfast Deaf United Football Club played in the Down Area Winter Football League.

Local Gaelic games clubs include St Enda's GAC (based near Glengormley) and Greencastle Wolfe Tones GAC (based at Greencastle). Both participate in competitions organised by the Antrim County Board.

Hockey teams based in Newtownabbey include East Antrim Hockey Club, Mossley Hockey Club, and Owls Hockey Club. There are also a number of rugby clubs, an amateur boxing club (Glengormley Amateur Boxing Club), and several cricket teams. These include the Academy and Cliftonville Cricket Clubs (the latter participating in the NCU Senior League).

Outdoor bowling clubs in Newtownabbey include Mossley Bowling Club, Glengormley Bowling Club, Nortel Bowling Club and Ulster Transport Bowling Club.

== Transport ==
=== Rail ===
Northern Ireland Railways runs trains serving three railway stations: Mossley West railway station on the Belfast–Derry railway line and Jordanstown railway station and Whiteabbey railway station on the Belfast–Larne railway line.

=== Road ===
Newtownabbey is linked to the M2 motorway (which passes through it) and the M5 motorway (which begins at its southeastern edge).

Bus services are provided by Translink’s Metro and Ulsterbus.

== Notable people ==
- Ronan Bennett (born 1956), novelist and screenwriter, grew up in Newtownabbey
- Stephen Boyd (1931–1977), Golden Globe-winning actor, born in Glengormley
- James Brown (born 1968), Elvis impersonator, lives in Newtownabbey
- Corry Evans (born 1990), professional footballer, grew up in Newtownabbey
- Jonny Evans (born 1988), professional footballer, grew up in Newtownabbey
- Dean McCullough (born 1992), British radio personality, lives in Newtownabbey
- Leah McFall (born 1986), singer-songwriter, born in Newtownabbey
- Bobby Sands (1954–1981), Provisional Irish Republican Army member and hunger striker, grew up in Newtownabbey

== Twin towns ==
Newtownabbey is twinned with:

- Rybnik, Poland (since 18 October 2003)
- Dorsten, Germany

Newtownabbey has one sister city, as designated by Sister Cities International:

- Gilbert, Arizona, United States

== See also ==
- List of localities in Northern Ireland by population
