= Glengormley =

Suburb of Belfast, Northern Ireland

Coordinates: 54.678000°N 5.963000°W

Glengormley: Irish: Gleann Ghormlaithe
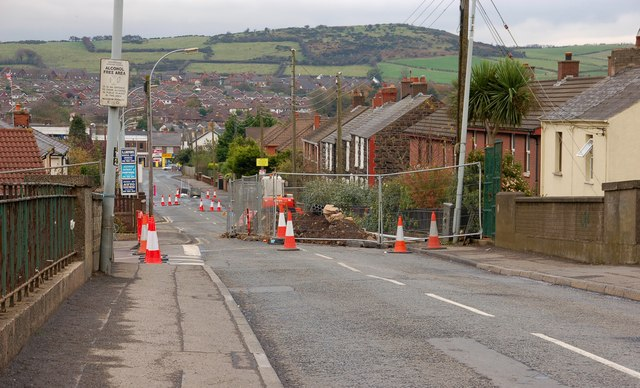
- View of Glengormley along Hightown Road (B95)

- Location within Northern Ireland
- Population: 21,027 (2011 Census)
- District: Antrim and Newtownabbey
- County: County Antrim
- Country: Northern Ireland
- Sovereign state: United Kingdom
- Post town: NEWTOWNABBEY
- Postcode district: BT36
- Dialling code: 028
- UK Parliament: Belfast North
- NI Assembly: South Antrim

Glengormley (from Irish Gleann Ghormlaithe, meaning 'Gormlaith's valley') is a townland (of 215 acres) and electoral ward in County Antrim, Northern Ireland. Glengormley is within the urban area of Newtownabbey bordering Belfast, and is located in the Antrim and Newtownabbey Borough Council area. It is also situated in the civil parish of Carnmoney and the historic barony of Belfast Lower.

== Location ==
The original settlement grew up in the mid-19th century, around a junction of the roads linking Belfast with Antrim and Ballyclare.

The wider suburban area of Glengormley borders North Belfast, Carnmoney and Mallusk. It is a popular residential area, include developments in 1995 - 2005 which have seen an expansion upwards from the village to the Hightown Road.

Glengormley is 6 miles (10 km) from Belfast city centre; the sixth milestone from the city centre is located on the Ballyclare Road beside Glengormley High School.

== Geography ==
As the lowest pass through the Belfast hills from the northern prospect, Glengormley is also traversed by major communication arteries including the Belfast to Londonderry railway line (served by Mossley West halt) and the M2 motorway.

As a main conduit for commuters, the townland experiences chronic congestion problems during peak times of the day, particularly on the A6 or Antrim Road. The M2 motorway runs close by and is accessible from the Sandyknowes Roundabout located at the end of the A6, with slip roads to the M2 northbound and southbound carriageways. The A8(M) motorway, which links Belfast with the port town of Larne and the main road into the Mallusk and Hydepark Industrial Estates as well as many other B roads are also accessible from Sandyknowes.

Despite being technically a glen (the area is in the valley between Cave Hill and Carnmoney Hill), Glengormley (Village) sits at 116m (380ft) above sea level with nearby Carnmoney Hill standing at 231m (757ft). Glengormley has a climate noticeably colder than the adjacent Lagan valley area. The cold and windy weather may be explained by the 'tunnel' of natural features running from the Antrim coast to the edge of Glengormley on the Hightown Road. The 'tunnel' can be seen from the Cavehill Country Park entrance at Hightown Road, looking north towards Slemish.

== History ==
From Victorian times to the 1930s, Glengormley was often the final destination on the leisure trail for working-class Belfast citizens escaping the city grime. The three main stops on the trail were Belfast Castle, Belfast Zoo, and the dance hall in Glengormley, opposite the present day Glen Inn. The journey was made by tram or trolley bus or train. The Belfast Street Tramway Company replaced carts with horse-drawn trams and the Cavehill and Whitewell Tramway company ran a steam tramway from Glengormley into Belfast.

Sentry Hill was an early 19th-century farmhouse on the hill above Glengormley and Corr's Corner in Newtownabbey, Co Antrim. It was the home of William Fee McKinney - a prosperous farmer and meticulous collector of farming, church and other records and artefacts. He was a member of the Linen Hall library and the Belfast Natural History and Philosophical Society. He was also the secretary of Carnmoney Presbyterian Church for 62 years.

== Leisure ==
Glengormley is within walking distance of the Cavehill Country Park and Belfast Zoo. The expansive Valley Park provides a safe cycling route to the North Shore coastal cycle path and onwards to central Belfast.

At the southern end of Glengormley there is a 6 screen cinema, 10 pin bowling alleys, three snooker halls (two at the southern end and one at the northern end) and some commercial premises.

== Sports ==
Glengormley also hosts a Gaelic Athletic Association club located on the Hightown road, St Enda's GAC/Naomh Éanna CLG, Glengormley Amateur Boxing Club and a Mixed Martial Arts club. The townland does not boast a major association football club of its own in the NIFL, but is approximately equidistant from three such clubs; Cliftonville F.C. and Crusaders F.C to the south east and south west respectively, and Ballyclare Comrades to the North.

== Commercial ==
Glengormley hosts major commercial complexes in the Mallusk Enterprise Park, including Royal Mail, Henderson's group, Diageo; (Baileys global supply) and Marks and Spencer distribution centre for Ireland.

== Transport ==
Translink Metro Route 1 and Routes 2A/B pass through the village as well as Ulsterbus Route 120 to Ballymena via Antrim Route 153 to Ballyclare and Newtownabbey town service 367 From Northcott Shopping centre to Greenisland Estate via Glengormley village and O'Neill road which connects to the Abbeycentre and Whiteabbey village.

At peak times, Translink Metro and Ulsterbus buses to Belfast pass through Glengormley approximately every ten minutes, and take approximately twenty to thirty minutes to reach the city centre via the A6 Antrim Road, A2 Shore Road and the M2 motorway with Translink's express service. Belfast is accessed by car via the main arterial route, the Antrim Road or by joining the M2 motorway at the Sandyknowes roundabout in the north of the village.

- Translink Metro route 1 starts at Queen Street which goes up the Antrim Road and passes Belfast Zoo into Glengormley. From Glengormley the routes split to serve neighbouring local areas.
- Translink Metro routes 2A/B also start at Queen street and operate via Shore road with route 2A serving whitewell Road, Glengormley, Carnmoney Road and Prince Charles Way to Fairview Road. Route 2B serves the Abbeycentre, Whitewell Road, Glengormley, Ballyclare Road and Manse Road which also ends at Fairview Road.
- Route 1A serves Carnmoney Road, Princes Charles Way, Beverley Road, Fairview Road, Ballyfore Road, Doagh Road and terminates at Glenville (Newtownabbey bus depot).
- Route 1B serves Antrim Road, Jubilee Way (Tesco), Ballyclare Road, Ballyearl Drive, Ballyearl Way, Milewater Drive and terminates at New Mossley (Manse Way).
- Route 1C serves Antrim Road, Jubilee Way (Tesco), Ballyclare Road, Ballyearl Drive, Ballyearl Way, Milewater Drive, Campbell Road, Beverley Road, Fairview Road, Ballyfore Road, Doagh Road and terminates at Glenville (Newtownabbey bus depot).
- Route 1D serves Ballyclare Road, Ballyearl Drive, Ballyearl Way, Milewater Drive, Campbell Road, Carnmoney Road North, The Glade and terminates at Mossley West Train Station.
- Route 1E serves Hightown Road, Mallusk Road, Mallusk Industrial Estate, Mallusk Cemetery, Old Coach Road and terminates at Roughfort.
- Route 1F serves Antrim Road, Sandyknowes Park, Scullions Road, Mallusk Industrial Estate, Aylesbury Place and terminates at Blackrock (Hydepark Road).
- Route 1G serves Antrim Road, Sandyknowes Park, Ballyhenry Road, Ballyclare Road, Ballyearl Drive and terminates at Ballyearl Way.
- Route 1J serves Hightown Road, Mallusk Road and terminates at Royal Mail (Enterprise Way).

Translink Metro's Glider service is projected to terminate in an out of town Park and Ride facility on the O'Neil Road as part of the new North South Glider G3 as part of Belfast Rapid Transport 2. The service was previously going to terminate at the current Glengormley Centre bus stop but will now be connected with feeder services from the Park and Ride facility. The works on the project have been delayed as and minor works will take place from 2027.

== Demographics ==
At the time of the 2001 UK census:

- 21.4% were under 16 years old and 21.7% were aged 60 and over;
- 47.1% of the population were male and 52.9% were female;
- 40.3% were from a Catholic community background and 56.1% were from a 'Protestant and Other Christian (including Christian related)' community background;
- 29.4% of persons aged 16 and over were single (never married); 37.8 years was the average age of the population; and the population density was 60.3 persons per hectare.

At the 2011 census:

- 19.93% were aged under 16 years and 17.94% were aged 65 and over;
- 46.88% of the usually resident population were male and 53.12% were female; and 37 years was the average (median) age of the population.
- 43.78% belong to or were brought up in the 'Catholic religion' and 47.89% belong to or were brought up in a 'Protestant and Other Christian religions'

== Points of interest ==
The Crown and Shamrock pub on the Antrim Road in Glengormley is one of the oldest pubs in County Antrim and has been made famous by the film "Middletown" where many of the scenes were filmed.

== Notable residents ==
- Stephen Boyd (1931–1977) — actor, co-starred as Messala with Charlton Heston in Ben-Hur (1959), Fantastic Voyage (1966) and many other films, was born in nearby Whitehouse and lived in Glengormley.
- Padraic Fiacc — lived in Glengormley.
- Derek Mahon — Irish poet who lived in Glengormley. One of his best-known poems is entitled Glengormley.
- Bill Neely — TV reporter, 3 time BAFTA winner & Emmy winner, NBC News Chief Global Correspondent, grew up in Glengormley.
- Jeremy McWilliams — former GP motorcycle racer.
- Craig Cathcart — footballer; plays for Watford and Northern Ireland.
- Steve Moore — lead guitarist with heavy metal band, Stormzone, lives in Glengormley.
- Andrew Mitchell (footballer, born 1992) — footballer; played for Rangers, former pupil of Glengormley High School.l.
- Adam Keefe (ice hockey) — ice hockey player; coach; Belfast Giants. Former player and current coach of the Belfast Giants ice hockey team (2017–present)
