= History of roads in Ireland =

Coordinates: 53.58615°N 6.70938°W

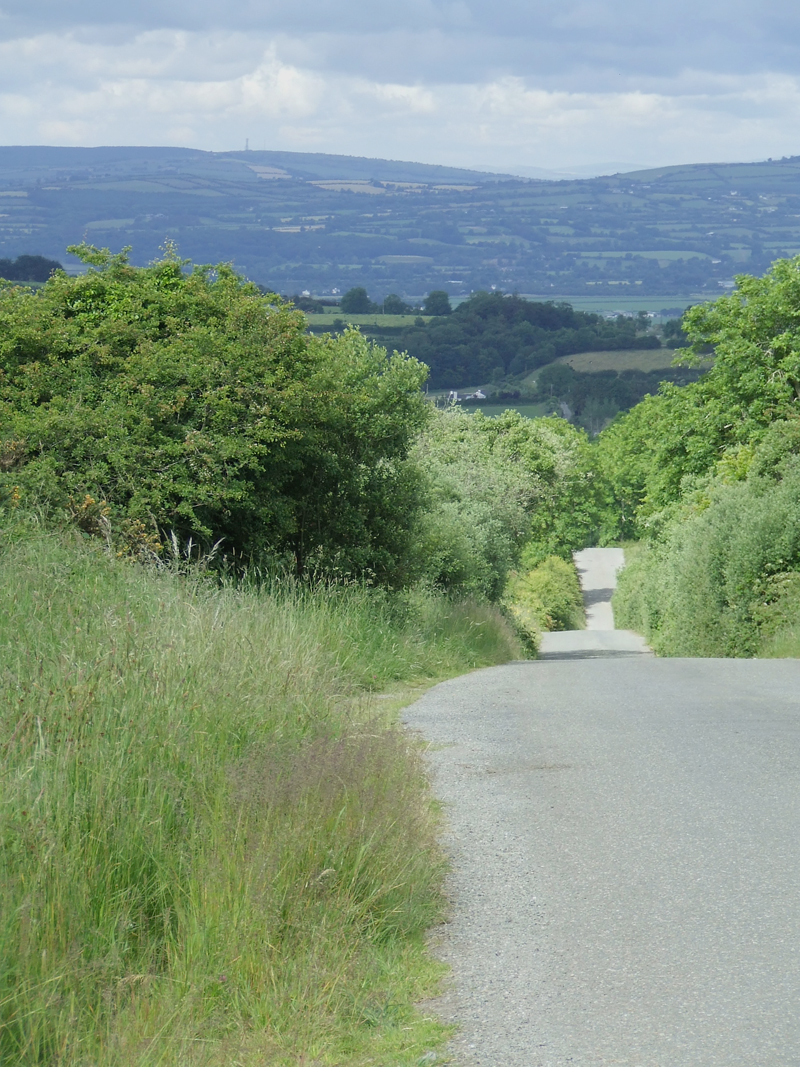
A country road in a hilly landscape in Ireland

There have been routes and trackways in Ireland connecting settlements and facilitating trade since ancient times and the country now has an extensive network of public roads connecting all parts of the island.

== Early history ==
The first routes in Ireland were prehistoric trackways, some of which were later developed into roads suited for wheeled vehicles. Many of Ireland's minor roads "may well have had their origin in pre-existing paths and trackways aligned in direct response to the physical environment". Traces of these evolved roads which developed over very long periods, frequently from tracks of the prehistoric period, are still evident. The routes of such roads usually followed the natural landscape, following the tops of ridges and crossing rivers and streams at fording points.

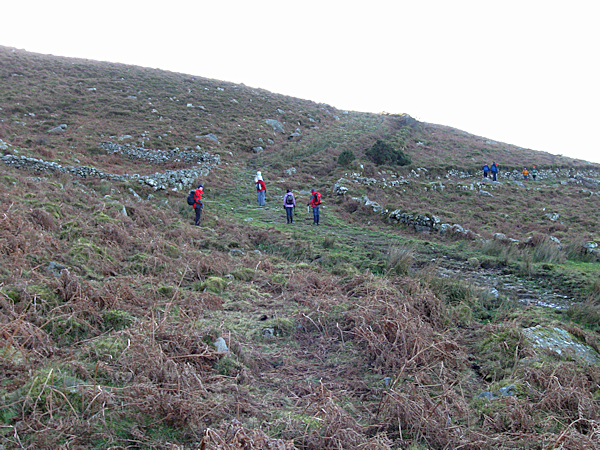
Hikers at the junction of old trackways crossing the Blackstairs Mountains from County Carlow to County Wexford

There is almost no evidence that large roads were constructed in Ireland during the Stone Age. However, a very large oval henge enclosure, thought to date from c. 2500 BC (the Neolithic period) may possibly have had an ancient roadway associated with it. The henge was discovered at the Hill of Tara archaeological complex in geophysical surveys carried out between 1999 and 2001. It is unlikely that any roadway from this period would have been used as a transport route. Excavations carried out at Edercloon, County Longford in advance of road construction discovered a dense "network of wooden trackways and platforms, which were constructed from the Neolithic (c. 4000-c. 2200BC) to the early medieval period (c. AD 400–790)."

Wheeled vehicles with solid wooden disc-wheels were introduced into northern Europe around 2000 BC. An example of a disc-wheel, from the Netherlands, was found next to a wooden trackway: "it appears from this evidence that the introduction of disc-wheeled carts into…northern Europe required the invention of roadbuilding about 2000 B.C." An Early Bronze Age trackway, from shortly after 2000 BC, was found at Ballykillen Bog, near Edenderry, County Offaly in the 19th century. It may have been designed to carry disc-wheeled vehicles. A one kilometre (0.62 miles) section of a wooden trackway, three feet (approx. 1 metre) wide and 1 km long was surveyed at Corlona Bog in County Leitrim in the 1950s. The trackway was dated by radiocarbon dating to approximately 1500 BC but its narrow width makes it unlikely that it was used by wheeled vehicles. Similar wooden trackways and roads are known from all over Ireland from the Late Bronze Age. One example from Ballyalbanagh, County Antrim was seven feet (2.1 metres) wide and made from oak beams and planks: "its width suggests provision for cart or wagon transport."

Archaeological excavations have found some roads built with stone in the Irish Iron Age. Ireland was never part of the Roman Empire and, therefore, Roman roads were not built in Ireland. However, a 22-kilometre long Iron Age road with a stone surface, part of a defensive complex, has been excavated in Munster: this, along with similar excavations, demonstrates that "Roman methods of road construction were known in Ireland." Generally, most surfaced tracks from this period were made with wood and were designed to facilitate travel through (or to) bogs. Togher (Irish: tóchar) roads, a type of causeway built through bogs, were found in many areas of the country.

Although law-tracts in Early Medieval Ireland described several different types of road, and Irish annals referred to a network of major highways, there is no evidence to suggest that Ireland ever had a network of roads as well developed as those found in the Roman Empire or other ancient societies. The road network remained underdeveloped throughout the Late Medieval and much of the Early Modern periods: it was not until the 18th century that an extensive system of roads suitable for long-distance travel was developed. Newly built roads were relatively wide and straight. Many still form the backbone of the current major roads network. The development of roads continued throughout the early 19th century until the arrival of the railways which became the dominant form of land transport from the 1840s–1850s onwards. The development of the internal combustion engine and of motorised vehicles led to increases in traffic on roads, which were developed and improved as a result. Ireland's roads have continued to develop and improve up to the present day. Various development programmes have successively increased the number of motorways and dual carriageways within the national roads network while other roads have had their surfaces and signposting improved.

== Roads in medieval Ireland ==
=== Five great roads ===
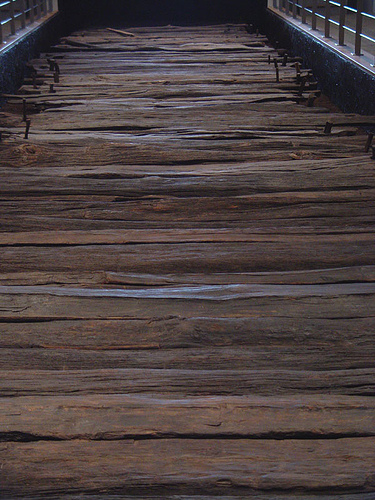
Section of the Corlea Trackway on display at Corlea Trackway Visitors Centre, Kenagh, County Longford

According to an entry in the Annals of the Four Masters for AD 123, there were five principal highways (Irish: slighe) leading to Tara (Irish: Teamhair) in Early Medieval Ireland. The entry in the Annals claims that these routes were 'discovered' at the birth of Conn of the Hundred Battles:

The night of Conn's birth were discovered five principal roads leading to Teamhair, which were never observed till then. These are their names: Slighe Asail, Slighe Midhluachra, Slighe Cualann, Slighe Mhór, Slighe Dala. Slighe Mhór is that called Eiscir Riada, i.e. the division line of Ireland into two parts, between Conn and Eoghan Mór.

In reality, "the ancient road system (such as it was – there cannot have been a developed national system) fanned out not from Tara but from Dublin.".

- The Slighe Assail went due west towards Lough Owel in County Westmeath, then to Cruachain.
- The Slighe Midluachra went towards Slane, through the Moyry Pass north of Dundalk, round the base of Slieve Fuaid, near Newtownhamilton in County Armagh, to Emain Macha, ending at Dunseverick on the north coast of County Antrim.
- The Slighe Cualann ran south-east through Dublin, crossing the River Liffey via a hurdle-bridge, then went south "through the old district of Cualann, which it first entered a little north of Dublin, and from which it took its name".
- The Slighe Dala ran towards and through Ossory in County Kilkenny.
- The Slighe Mhór ('Great Highway') joined the Esker Riada near Clonard, County Meath. It then, more-or-less, followed the Esker Riada to County Galway.

Unlike Roman roads, these routes were not clearly physically defined:

It is important to remember that unlike, for example, Roman roads, these medieval routes were not essentially physical entities—thin strips of land with physical boundaries; rather they were rights of way, sometimes with legal and traditional status. Routes tended to follow the line of least resistance, twisting and turning to avoid poorly drained areas and land that was easily overlooked. Where there was a hill to climb or a difficult area to pass through, multiple tracks would develop, the traveller taking the easiest route. Routes may also have varied seasonally as changing weather affected the condition of the pathway.

=== Early medieval road terminology ===
An early medieval Irish law tract, produced the first written details of different categories of roads that existed in Pre-Christian Pagan Ireland. It set out five types of road:

the 'highway', slige, on which two carpait/carpenta [chariots] could pass without one having to give way to the other, the 'local road', rout [or ród], on which at least one carpat/carpentum and two riders can pass side by side as a regional main road, the 'connecting road', lámraite, a minor road connecting two major roads, the 'side road', tógraite, leading to a forest or a river, which private persons could rent, for which they then could extract tolls from people driving cattle on them, and finally the 'cow road', bóthar, which still had to be as wide as two cows, one standing parallel and one normal to the road.

Conair and cai were general terms, given in Cormac's Glossary, for any type of road and "thirty-seven ancient roads [were] mentioned with the general name bealach", meaning 'pass'. Cásan was a term used for a path and a ceis was a path made of wattles.

The word bóthar is now the most commonly used term for road in modern Irish: its diminutive form, bóithrín, (or boreen in English) is used as a term for very narrow, rural roads.

Pre-Norman bridges were not built of stone: bridges were made of timber, sometimes supported by natural rock or on artificial piers. Toirdelbach Ua Briain was said to have built a wooden bridge across the Shannon at Killaloe in 1071. Geoffrey Keating's History of Ireland notes the building of bridges among the achievements of Toirdelbach Ua Conchobair (1088–1156): "This Toirrdhealbhach built three chief bridges in Connaught, to wit, the bridge of Ath Luain and the bridge of Ath Crochdha on the Sionainn and the bridge of Dun Leoghdha on the Succa." Some "bridges were constructed of strong hurdles supported on piles". A bridge of this type gave Dublin its Irish name: Baile Átha Cliath, 'Town of the Hurdled Ford'.

=== Esker Riada ===
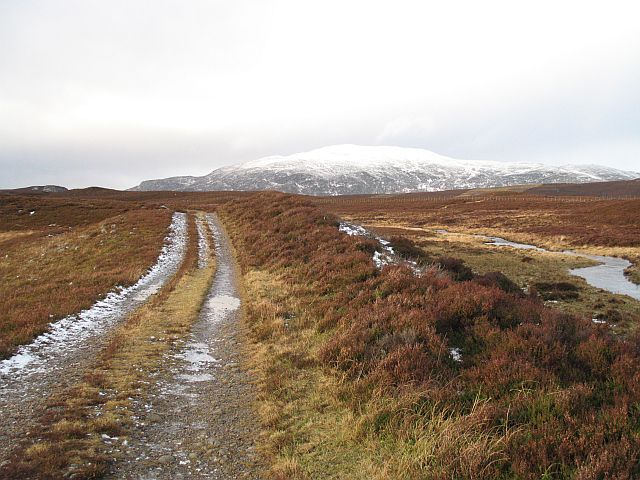
A road built on the ridge of an esker through a bog

The Esker Riada (Irish: Eiscir Riada) is a system of ridges, or eskers, that stretches across the narrowest point of Ireland, between Dublin and Galway.

Because the slightly higher ground of the Esker Riada provided a route through the bogs of the Irish midlands it has, since ancient times, formed a highway joining the east and west of Ireland: its ancient Irish name was An tSlighe Mhór meaning 'The Great Highway'. The route of the present Dublin-Kinnegad-Galway road (N4, M4, N6, M6) very approximately follows the route of the Esker Riada.

The Esker Riada also formed an ancient division of Ireland between Leath Cuinn ('Conn's Half') to the north, and Leath Mogha ('Mogha's Half') to the south.

=== Late medieval roads ===
Roads were not the most important transport routes in later medieval Ireland: most long-distance travel between towns was undertaken by sea or via inland waterways. Road conditions were difficult, often dangerous, and long-distance travel by road was generally slow and uncomfortable. Giraldus Cambrensis gives an indication of the slowness of travel in 12th century Ireland, which he also describes as a "truly a desert land [i.e. sparsely populated], without roads, but well watered."

...Ireland extends from the Brandane mountains to the island of Columba, called Thorach, the length of eight good Irish days' journey, which is forty miles to the day; and from Dublin to St. Patrick's hills and the sea of Connaught it is four such days' journey in breadth.

Travel by sea was faster than by land and it was easier to transport goods in bulk by ship than by road; one estimate reckons that a ship could travel sixty to ninety miles (97 to 145 km) per day whereas an overland traveller might cover a distance of only twenty-five miles (40 km).

Most tracks were not suitable for wheeled vehicles and pack animals were used to transport goods. Some attempts to improve routes were made in the Tudor period: "efforts were made to free main rivers of weirs that blocked transport, and military considerations accelerated road- and bridge-building, yet methods were somewhat unscientific and planning was haphazard." Despite these efforts, overland travel remained slow. In 1558, it took Thomas Radclyffe, 3rd Earl of Sussex and Lord Deputy of Ireland, two days to travel about sixty miles (c. 100 km) from Limerick to Galway.

== 17th to 19th century roads ==
=== 17th century ===
In 1614, the Irish Parliament passed the Highways Act 1613 (11, 12 & 13 Jas. 1. c. 7 (I)) which required local parishes to maintain roads within their boundaries which served market towns. The act did not regulate the construction of new roads or bridges although it did encourage improvements to existing roads and the construction of new ones, especially roads linking market towns in the Ulster Plantation area. The organisation of road maintenance on a parochial basis is partly responsible for the large numbers of minor roads found throughout Ireland. The Bridges, Causeways, and Highways Repair Act 1634 (10 Chas. 1 Sess. 2. c. 26 (I)) allowed for the levying of a tax "to ensure the repair, maintenance or reconstruction of bridges, fords or causeways." This formed the basis of the presentment system which was the main system for organising the construction and repair of roads and bridges in Ireland from 1634 to 1898.

The difficulties encountered by travellers on 17th-century Irish roads are amply illustrated by extracts from contemporary accounts of journeys.

A military gentleman going from Newry to Downpatrick in 1602 recounts that ...before we had ridden three miles we lost our way and were compelled to go on foot, leading our horses through bogs and marshes... The journey took two days. A few years later an account of the journey of a Scotsman through Ireland in 1619 and 1620 reflects the great difficulties which he encountered: Travelling in winter his horse constantly sank to its girths on the boggy roads, and his saddles and saddlebags were destroyed. Often he had to cross streams by swimming his horse, a dangerous procedure for, as he tells us, in five months he has foundered six horses. From such accounts it may be deduced that in general whatever roads and tracks did exist at this time were quite unfit for use by any form of wheeled vehicle.

=== 18th century ===
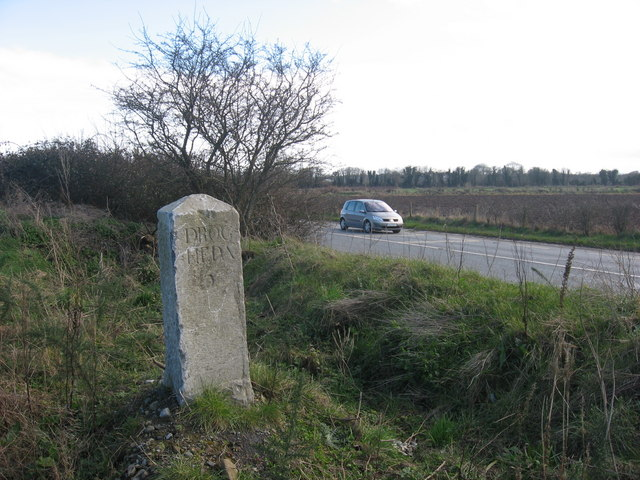
Milestone next to R132 (old N1) near Gormanston, County Meath

By the 18th century, Ireland had a well-developed network of roads, the principal ones being marked on Herman Moll's New Map of Ireland (1714) which showed, amongst other features, "Passes, Bridges &c. with the Principal Roads, and the common Reputed Miles" between towns.

In 1765, new legislation gave county Grand Juries the power to "...present such sum or sums of money, as they shall think fit, upon any barony or baronies in such county for the repairing [of] old roads or making new roads through such barony or baronies...". The presentment system of funding roads lasted until 1898 and it was successful in providing Ireland with a system of public roads which English travellers such as Arthur Young commented favourably on:

...for a country so very far behind us as Ireland to have got suddenly so much the start of us in the article of roads is a spectacle that cannot fail to strike the English traveller exceedingly.

New roads had to be at least 30 feet (9.1 metres) wide between fences and drains, with a 14 feet (4.3 metres) wide gravelled surface. In 1777, maintenance contracts, allowing for regular maintenance, were established. Taylor and Skinner's Maps of the Roads of Ireland was first published in 1778, with a second, revised edition in 1783. It provided detailed strip maps of the principal roads along with other topographical details.

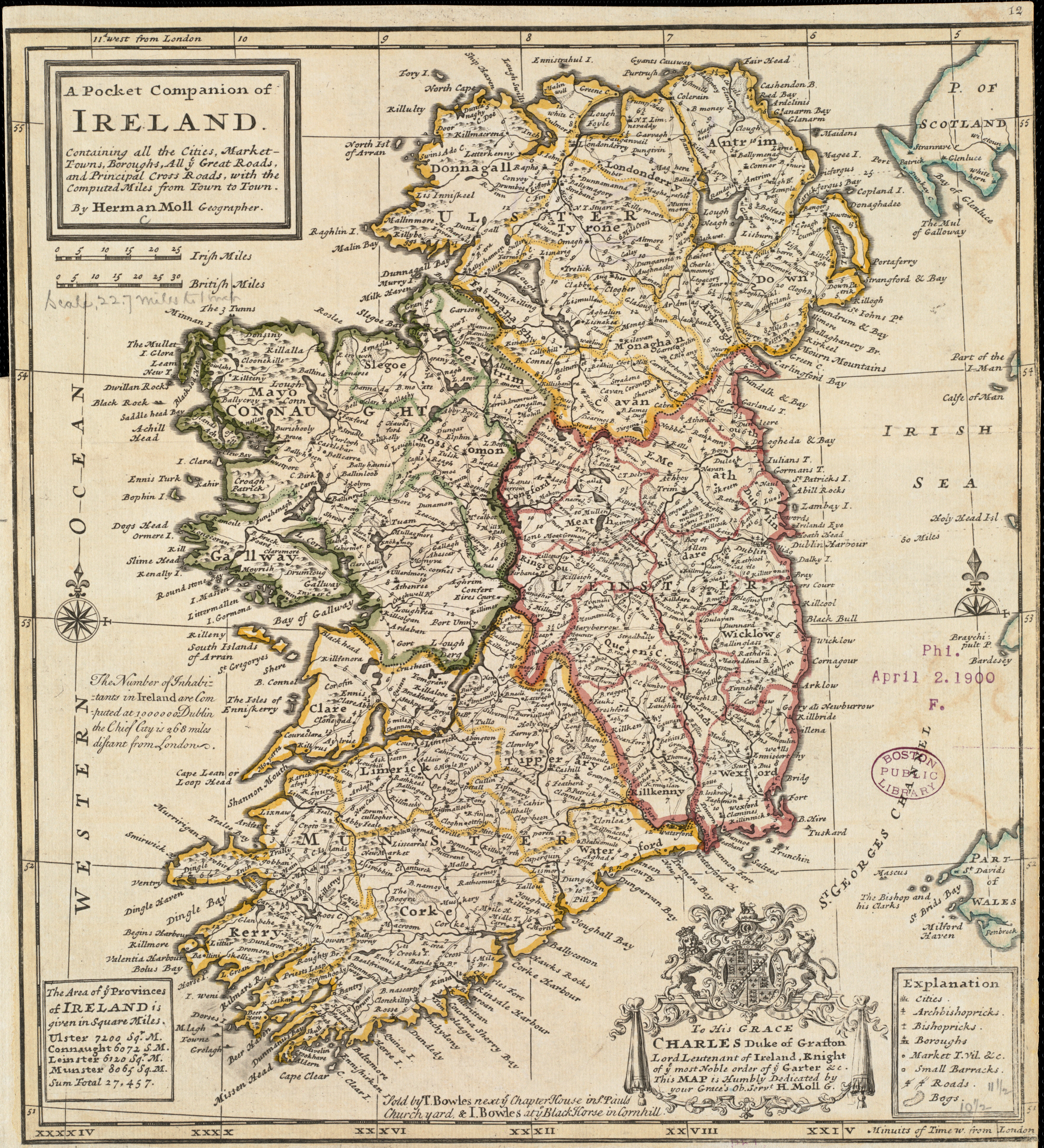
Herman Moll 1732 map showing the principal roads

From 1729, a network of turnpike roads (charging tolls) was built: "a turnpike was a primitive form of turnstile – a gate across the road, opened on payment of a toll. The average length of a turnpike road was 30 miles". Routes to and from Dublin were developed initially and the network spread throughout the country. Turnpikes operated between 1729 and 1858 when the extensive railway network made them increasingly unpopular. Turnpike roads were not as widely used in Ireland as they were in England because of the availability of toll-free alternatives, the roads built under the presentment system. Lack of traffic on some routes led to reduced toll income and maintenance was neglected. However, in the first quarter of the 19th century, mail-coach contracts increased income and the quality of turnpike roads improved. Turnpike roads were also used by horse-drawn carriage services, including the Bianconi coaches, established as a form of public transport by Charles Bianconi in 1815. By 1820, there were around 1,500 miles of turnpike roads in Ireland but this had fallen to 300 miles by 1856 when competition from the railways made many turnpike roads unprofitable. By 1858, turnpike roads in Ireland had been abolished.

Apart from roads themselves, traces of the turnpike roads exist physically as milestones and other features: there is a former toll-booth (18th or 19th-century) at Saint Luke's Cross in Cork. Some Irish placenames reflect the turnpike system: there are areas of Cork called Dublin Pike and Kerry Pike (as in turnpike) and the area at the junction of the N75 and the R639 (old N8) in County Tipperary is called Turnpike.

With the expansion of proper roads in the kingdom came a codification of driving on the left: a law of 1793 (33 Geo. 3. c. 56 (I)) provided a ten-shilling fine to anyone not driving or riding on the left side of the road within the county of the city of Dublin, and required the local road overseers to erect written or printed notices informing road users of the law. The Road in Down and Antrim Act 1798 (38 Geo. 3. c. 28 (I)) required drivers on the road from Dublin to Donaghadee to keep to the left. This time, the punishment was ten shillings if the offender were not the owner of the vehicle, or one Irish pound (twenty shillings) if he/she were. The Grand Juries (Ireland) Act 1836 (6 & 7 Will. 4 c. 116) mandated LHT for the whole island, violators to be fined up to five shillings and imprisoned in default for up to one month.

=== 19th century ===
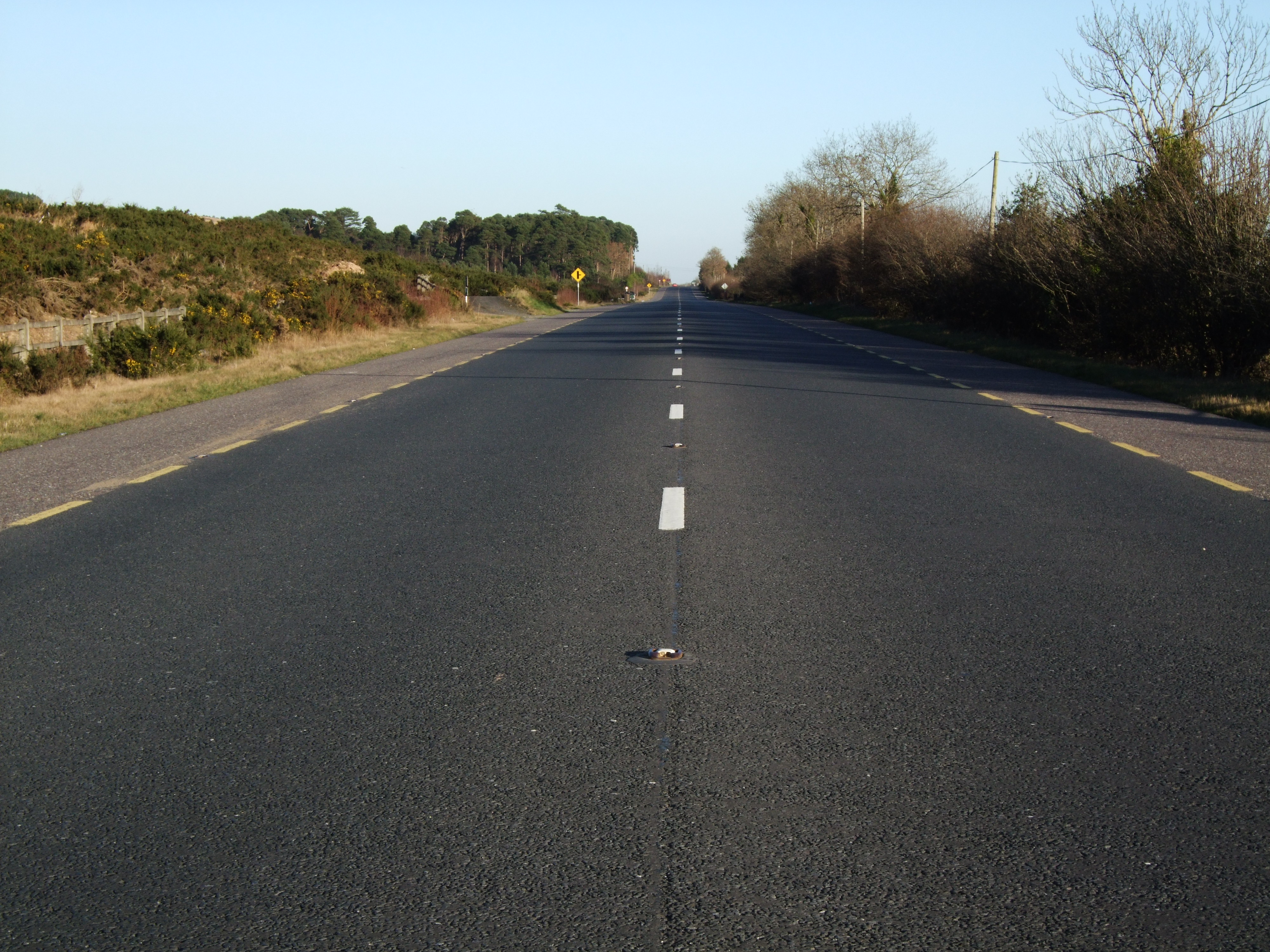
At various times known as the T6, N8 and now the R639, this road in County Tipperary was built after 1811

Although Ireland's road network was well developed by 1800, there were still many remote areas, especially in the western regions, that were not well served by roads. In 1822, government grants were made available for road building projects and roads were built to and in western counties. Newly built roads spurred major changes in some areas:

Belmullet had only three houses when the first wheeled vehicle arrived in 1823, but ten years later boasted 185 houses, together with corn-stores, shops and hotels.

In 1831, the Board of Public Works (Ireland) was set up. It had a wide range of public duties including the building of roads and bridges. The Irish Board of Public Works took over the grants scheme for newly built roads in 1832 and by 1848 was responsible for the administration of 1,600 kilometres (990 mi) of roads. Most of the major trunk roads in the north of Ireland were improved by the Board and a number of new routes, including the coast road between Larne and Ballycastle in County Antrim and the road between Strabane and Derry (now part of the A5 road). Smaller road schemes were initiated by the Congested Districts Board from 1891.

In the meantime, the Highways (Ireland) Act 1805 (45 Geo. 3. c. 43) required the Postmaster General to survey roads used by mail coaches and suggest improvements, including the widening of roads to a minimum width of 42 feet (13 metres). From 1805 to 1811, over 3,200 kilometres (2,000 mi) of post roads were surveyed by Major Alexander Taylor and his staff. Various improvements to existing roads were made and some new roads were built, for example, the road from Dublin to Slane (now part of the N2 and R135 roads).

Specialist routes to facilitate the butter trade, which centred on Cork, were built in Munster. The first butter road was commissioned in 1748 and was built by John Murphy of Castleisland in County Kerry: "one of his routes, opened in 1829, reduced the distance between Cork and Listowel from 102 to 66 miles – quite a feat, given the rough countryside over which it ran. Another, linking Cork with Killarney via Macroom and Glenflesk, came down to 57 miles from 88".

In other areas, notably in County Wexford and County Wicklow, military roads were built to help secure British military control over remote areas. The Military Road through County Wicklow was begun in 1800 and completed in 1809. The R115 is part of the Military Road for its entire length.

Many roads built in the 18th- and 19th-centuries formed the basis of the existing network of national primary, national secondary and regional roads (formerly trunk and link roads) in the Republic of Ireland and the main roads in Northern Ireland.

== 20th century onwards ==
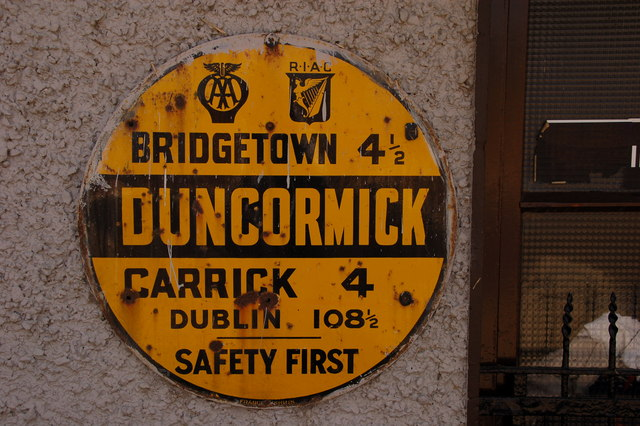
Early AA roundel at Duncormick in County Wexford

Railways became the dominant form of land transport from the mid-19th century. This situation persisted until the first half of the 20th century when motorised road transport (cars, buses and trucks) gradually began to take over from railways as the most important form of land transport.

The 20th century saw a renewed emphasis on roads as the primary method of facilitating land transport. The increase in motor vehicle traffic on roads meant that urgent improvements were required to make roads suitable for all vehicles in the automobile age.

In 1909, a Road Board was set up to improve roads. It was initially funded by a tax on motor fuel and a later a licence duty on cars, the Road Fund. Road surfaces were improved and roads were widened and straightened using money raised by the Road Fund. The Road Board was abolished in 1919 when its functions were transferred to the newly established Ministry of Transport.

=== Partition ===
From 1921 onwards, the partition of Ireland has led to different paths in the evolution of public road networks in Northern Ireland and the rest of Ireland.

In 1922, after the foundation of the Irish Free State, the Minister for Local Government took over the functions of the Ministry of Transport. In 2002, the newly renamed Department of Transport took over responsibility for national roads. Responsibility for roads in Northern Ireland fell on the Stormont administration from 1921 to 1972. In 1973, the Northern Ireland Roads Service was set up; it became an agency of the Northern Ireland Department for Regional Development when devolved government was restored in 1999.

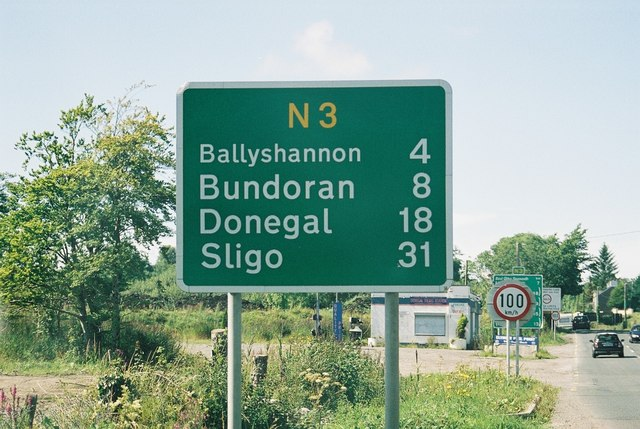
Road sign in Northern Ireland with Republic of Ireland route-number (N3). In English only with distances in miles

Several other differences, including in road classification and route-numbering, speed-limits, directional sign-posting and warning and regulatory signposting have developed since the 1920s. Signs in Northern Ireland denote distances in miles, while all directional signs placed in the Republic since 1974 use kilometres. Currently speed limits in miles per hour (mph) are used north of the border; those in the Republic are in kilometres per hour (km/h). SI speed limits were introduced on 20 January 2005, this involved the provision of 58,000 new metric speed limit signs, replacing 35,000 imperial signs. The Republic's road signs are bilingual, using both of the state's official languages, Irish and English while those in Northern Ireland are in English only. Northern Ireland uses directional, regulatory and warning signage which is almost identical to that used in Great Britain. Warning signs have black symbols on a white background with a red border, enclosed in a triangle-shaped sign. However, from 1956, the Republic of Ireland has used diamond-shaped warning signs, with black symbols or writing on a yellow (reddish-orange for temporary signs) background, and more regulatory and warning signage with red slashes and circles compared with the European norm of blue circles for mandatory signs and red circles without slashes for prohibitory signs. This is based on the United Nations' 1953 Draft Convention on Road Signs and Signals (an early attempt at reconciling American and European signage practices that led to the Vienna Convention).

=== Republic of Ireland ===
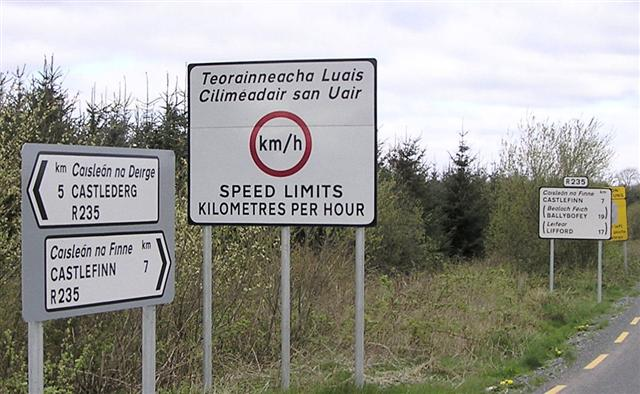
Signpost warning of km/h speed limits on R235 at County Donegal/County Tyrone border. Bilingual with distances in km.

Roads in the Republic are signed with M (for motorways), N (for national roads), R (for regional roads) and L (for Local roads). The appearance of L road-numbers on signposts only began in 2006, along with European route numbers on some major roads. Roads in Northern Ireland are signed with M (for motorways), A (for A-class roads) and B (for B-class roads). There are also C-class roads in Northern Ireland but these road-numbers are not currently shown on signposts.

The introduction of metric speed limits has led to the erection of signs warning motorists of the change to either the metric or imperial systems at the border. Differing road-numbering systems also mean that some signs in Northern Ireland display route-numbers used in the Republic and vice versa.

==== Road improvements: 1920s to 1950s ====
In 1922, the Irish Free State took over a network of public roads which required major improvements. Most road surfaces were made up of undressed and unrolled water-bound macadam which did not use tar as a sealant.

Under the Local Government Act 1925 (No. 5) the construction and maintenance of main roads and county roads became the responsibility of local county councils. Main roads and county roads were funded by the county less the urban districts and urban roads were funded by the urban districts.

The 1925 act also granted powers to order the removal or alteration of buildings, trees and hedges causing obstruction or danger, introduced a licensing system for the erection of petrol pumps and introduced powers to set speed limits and to regulate signposts.

Grants were made to local councils from the Road Fund for the improvement of roads and, later, their maintenance. By the 1930s, "the surfaces of the main roads had all been improved and attention could then be given to widening and improving alignment". Main roads now had tarmac surfaces in most instances although some sections of road, such as the Carrigrohane Road in Cork, were made from reinforced concrete. Road improvement schemes and road maintenance were effectively suspended during World War II due to the scarcity of tar and bitumen. After the war, roads that had deteriorated due to lack of maintenance during the war were restored and other improvements were made: "the effect of all these measures was a marked improvement in both main and county roads".

==== Trunk roads and link roads ====
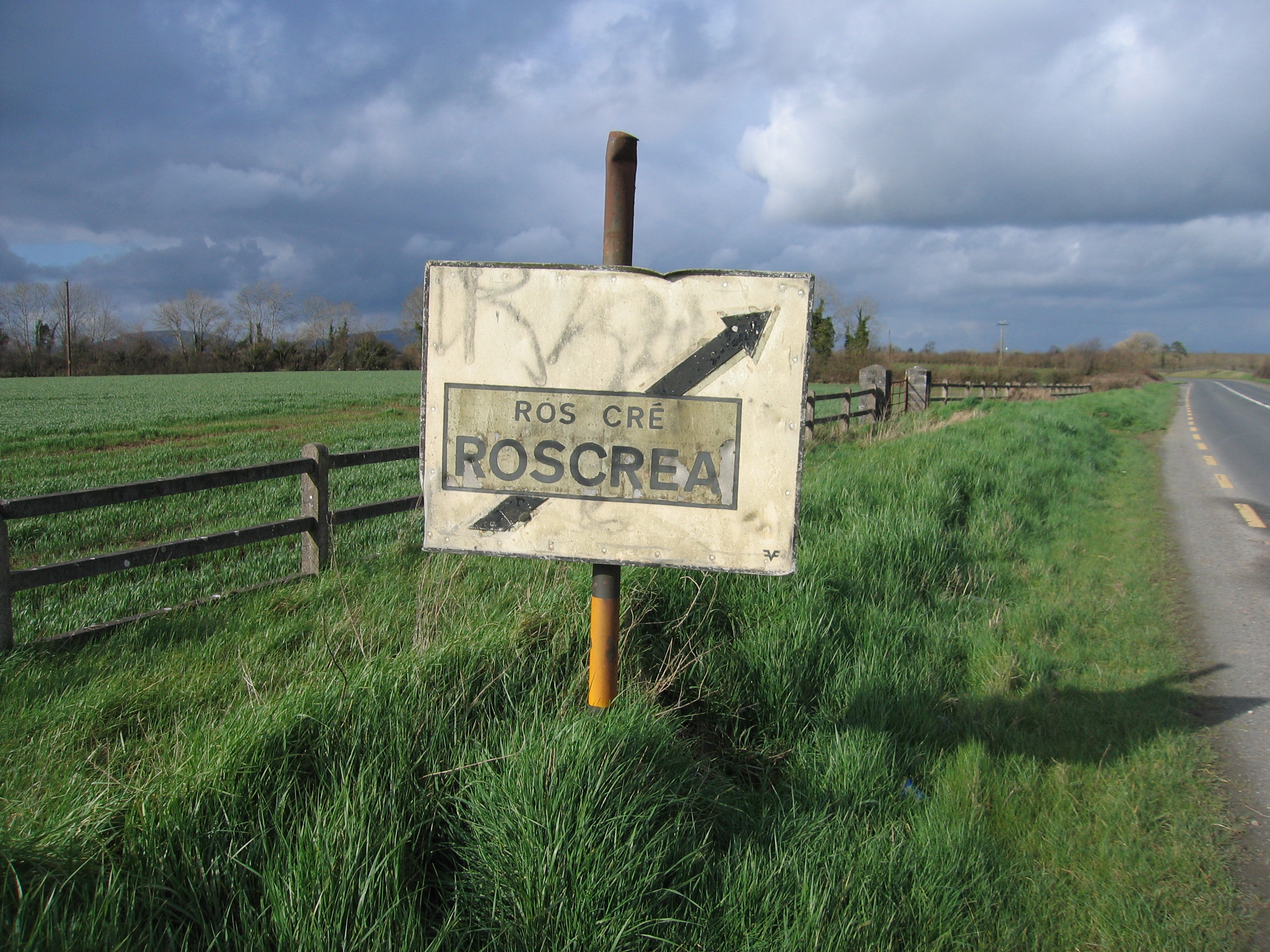
Old Trunk Road direction sign en route to Roscrea

Various systems of road classification have operated in Ireland since 1925: the Local Government Act 1925 divided roads into main roads, county roads and urban roads, giving the Minister for the Environment the power to decide which roads were main roads.

Roads in Ireland are currently classified as motorways, national primary routes, national secondary routes, regional roads and local roads. The introduction of this classification system began in 1977.

Prior to this, Ireland had a different road classification and numbering system. Roads fell into three categories: T (trunk roads), L (link roads) and unclassified roads. The origins of this system lie in pre-independence legislation: the preliminary section of Statutory Instrument S.I. No. 55/1926 — Road Signs and Traffic Signals Regulations, 1926 states that the Ministry of Transport Act 1919 gave the Minister for Local Government and Public Health the power to assign a "route letter and number" to a road, while section 6.4 of part I of the regulations specified the positioning of the "route letter and the number of the road" on directional signs. A reference in the statutory instrument to the "classification of roads as a 'Trunk' or 'Link' Road" indicates that a system of route classification and numbering was envisaged in the 1920s. However, at present, there is no information about when the Trunk and Link road-numbering system was actually introduced on signposts. Even though legal authority for the erection of directional signposts was given to local councils, the Automobile Association of Ireland began an extensive road signposting scheme in 1938 which included comprehensive signposting of routes from Belfast, Cork and Dublin.

Evidence that the trunk road and link road classification and numbering system had been well established by the 1950s is found in Statutory Instrument S.I. No. 284/1956 — Traffic Signs Regulations, 1956, which contains examples of several directional signs. The first and second examples show the T8 as the route to Wexford and Rosslare. In addition, Esso road-maps of Ireland from the 1950s show the trunk and link road network. Despite its long-standing use, the original trunk and link road system was never legislated for and the routes of trunk roads and link roads were never formally designated by law.

==== Current system ====
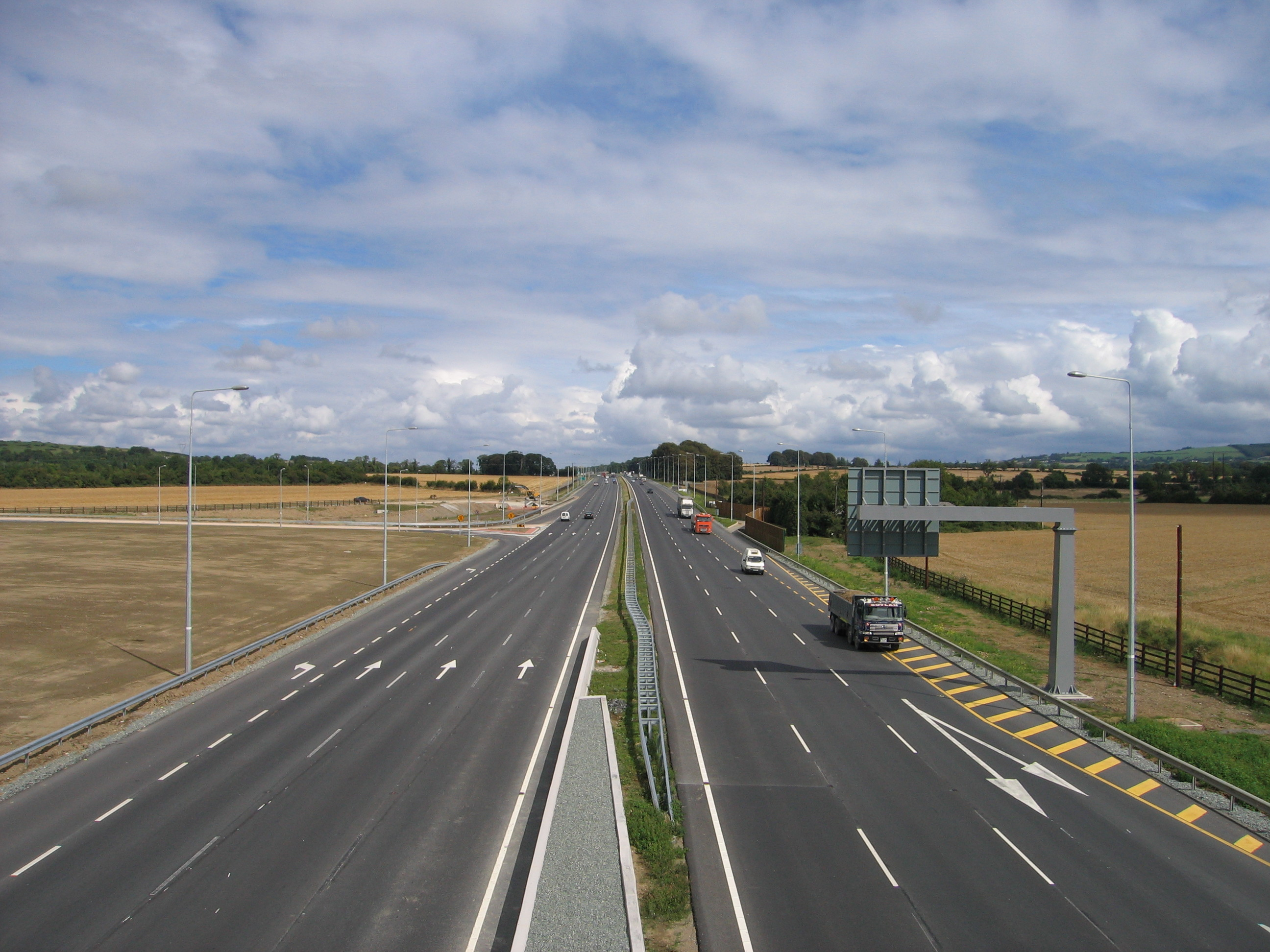
N7 dual-carriageway, near Dublin

This current system of road classification, numbering and network management has its origins in the late 1960s. A 1969 study into road construction and management recommended a reclassification of the road system into national roads (primary and secondary), regional roads (primary and secondary) and county roads. This system, without the division of regional roads into primary and secondary categories, was later adopted.

On 23 July 1969 the Minister for Local Government, Kevin Boland, announced that a national road network would be formed. The Local Government (Roads and Motorways) Act 1974 came into effect. It allowed for designation of roads as motorways or national roads. National roads were first designated by statutory instrument S.I. No. 164/1977 on 1 June 1977. Twenty-five national primary routes (N1-N25) and thirty-three national secondary routes (N51-N83) were initially designated.

The changeover to the new system was gradual: a route planning map of Ireland from the late 1970s (or early 1980s), divided into a northern section and a southern section, shows a mixture of trunk road, link road and national route numbers. Many of the remaining classified roads became regional roads (formally authorised under the Roads Act 1993, route-numbers having been present on road signs on a non-statutory basis for some years previously) and their routes were designated under a statutory instrument ('SI') in 1994. The latest SI designating the routes of regional roads was published in 2012: the Roads Act 1993 (Classification of Regional Roads) Order 2012. Other roads formerly classified as trunk or link roads eventually became Local roads under the 1993 act which states that "a public road, other than a national road or a regional road, shall be a local road".

The Roads Act 1993 gave local authorities the duty to "assign a number or other identifying mark to each local road in respect of which it has responsibility". Local road numbers have been used for administrative purposes since the act came into effect, but local road numbers did not generally appear on directional signposts until the late 2000s. Most road-maps do not show local road numbers, although some are marked on OpenStreetMap.

Older signs showing the former trunk and link road designations are still to be seen in some locations. The L (for 'link road') prefix on these signs is not connected to the network of local roads currently in place.

==== Road improvements: 1980s and 1990s ====
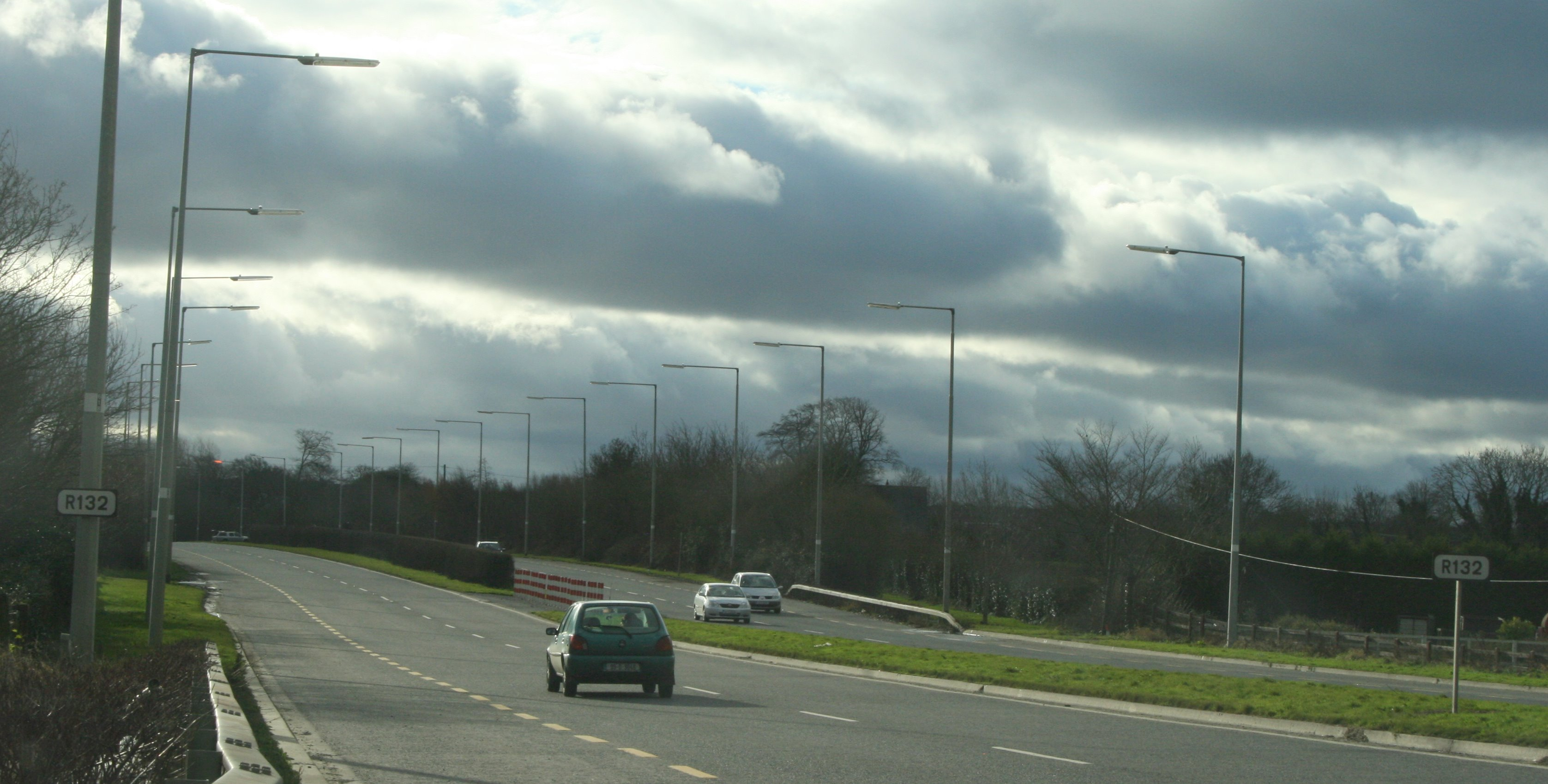
Dual-carriageway bypass near Swords, County Dublin originally built in 1984 as the N1, now the R132.

In 1979, in the wake of new EU laws and with the availability of EU funding, a strategic plan for the development of the national road network was published, entitled "Road Development Plan for the 1980s". The plan's main aims were:

- the provision of an adequate strategic inter-urban road system connecting the principal towns, seaports and airports
- the adoption of a minimum two-lane standard for the national route network with higher standards for particular sections
- the provision of bypasses of a number of towns on the national routes
- a programme of new river crossings, ring roads and relief routes in the cities and other major urban centres

The National Development Plan (1989–1993) set out a programme of road improvements costed at €1,257 million (1989 prices): it "included thirty-four major improvement projects involving the provision of dual carriageway or motorway on 290 kilometres of national primary routes"; another 290 kilometers were to be upgraded to wide single carriageway standard (7.3-metre carriageway plus two 3-metre hard shoulders). A further €3,316 million (1994 prices) was spent on national primary routes between 1994 and 1999. Four key strategic corridors were identified for major improvements. These programmes meant that by the end of 1993, 35% of the national road network was "adequate or improved", 53% (with improvements to another 11% of the network underway) by the end of 1999.

Some changes were made to the national road network in the 1980s and 1990s. In 1980, two national secondary roads (N84 and N85) were added to the network with the N86 being added in 1986. These roads had previously been either Trunk or regional roads. In 1994, three national secondary roads (N57, N64, N79) were reclassified as national primary roads and subsequently renumbered (N57 to N26, N64 to part N18, N79 to N30) while a section of the N60 between Castlebar and Westport in County Mayo was reclassified as part of the N5. A section of the N56 between Letterkenny and Stranorlar in County Donegal was reclassified as a southern section of the N13.

Four other national primary routes (N27, N28, N29, N31) and one national secondary route (N87, previously part of the R200 and R202 regional roads) were added to the network and the regional road between Killarney and Killorglin in County Kerry became part of the N72. A section of the R600 regional road between Cork city centre and Cork Airport was reclassified as the N27, the N28 was partly newly constructed and partly a reclassified section of regional road (R609), the N29 was newly constructed and the N31 was made up of roads previously classified as regional roads. The N32 was added in 1996 and the N33 was added after its completion.

The National Roads Authority (NRA) was established on a statutory basis by the Roads Act 1993 from 1 January 1994: "the Authority's primary function, under the Roads Act 1993, is 'to secure the provision of a safe and efficient network of national roads'. For this purpose, it has overall responsibility for planning and supervision of construction and maintenance works on these roads." Apart from the construction and maintenance of motorways and national roads, the NRA is responsible for providing traffic signs on national roads. Many of the larger schemes (some of which are tolled) initiated by the NRA have been built through public-private partnership (PPP) arrangements which "has resulted in €2.1billion of private sector funding being secured for national road schemes."

==== Road improvements: 2000–2010 ====
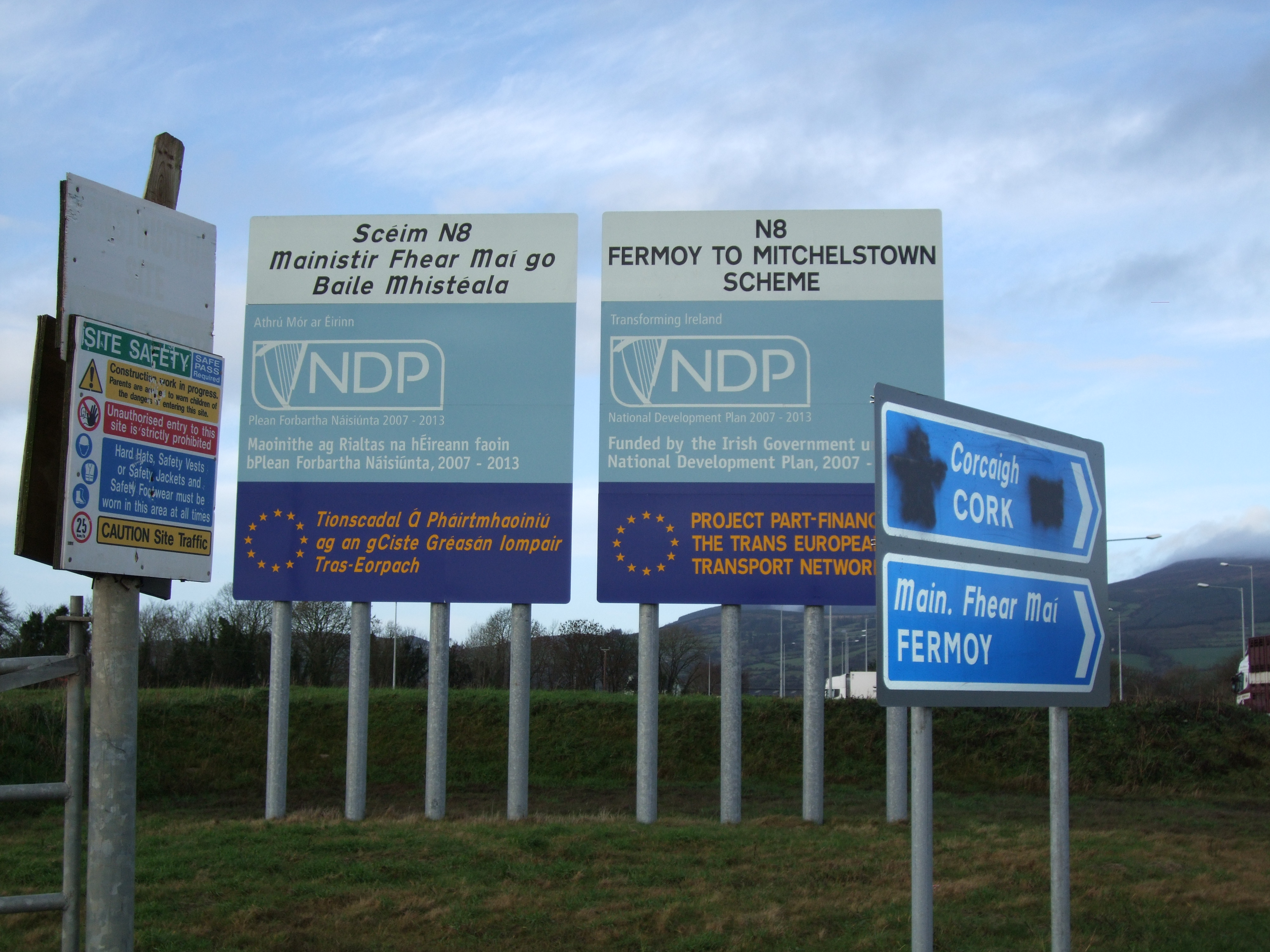
NDP signage erected in 2007

The 2000–2006 National Development Plan (NDP) set new objectives for the development and improvement of Ireland's national road network. Several routes (the Major Inter-Urban routes) were selected for upgrading to motorway or high-quality dual carriageway standard. This objective was modified and these routes are of motorway standard on completion in December 2010. The development plan set out to achieve the following national road improvements:

development of five major inter-urban routes (Dublin to the border [north of Dundalk], Dublin to Galway, Dublin to Cork, Dublin to Limerick, Dublin to Waterford) to motorway/high-quality dual carriageway standard; a programme of major improvements on other national primary routes; completion of the M50 motorway and the Dublin Port Tunnel; improvement of national secondary routes of particular importance to economic development

All of the above objectives were achieved by December 2010. The M50 was completed in 2005 and underwent a major upgrade between 2006 and 2010, the Dublin Port Tunnel opened to all traffic on 28 January 2007, one major inter-urban route (the M1/N1 from Dublin to the border north of Dundalk) was completed in 2007 and the other major inter-urban routes were completed by December 2010. Major improvements were made to other national primary routes, notably the N11 (Dublin-Wexford) and N18/N19 (Limerick-Shannon-Galway) routes.

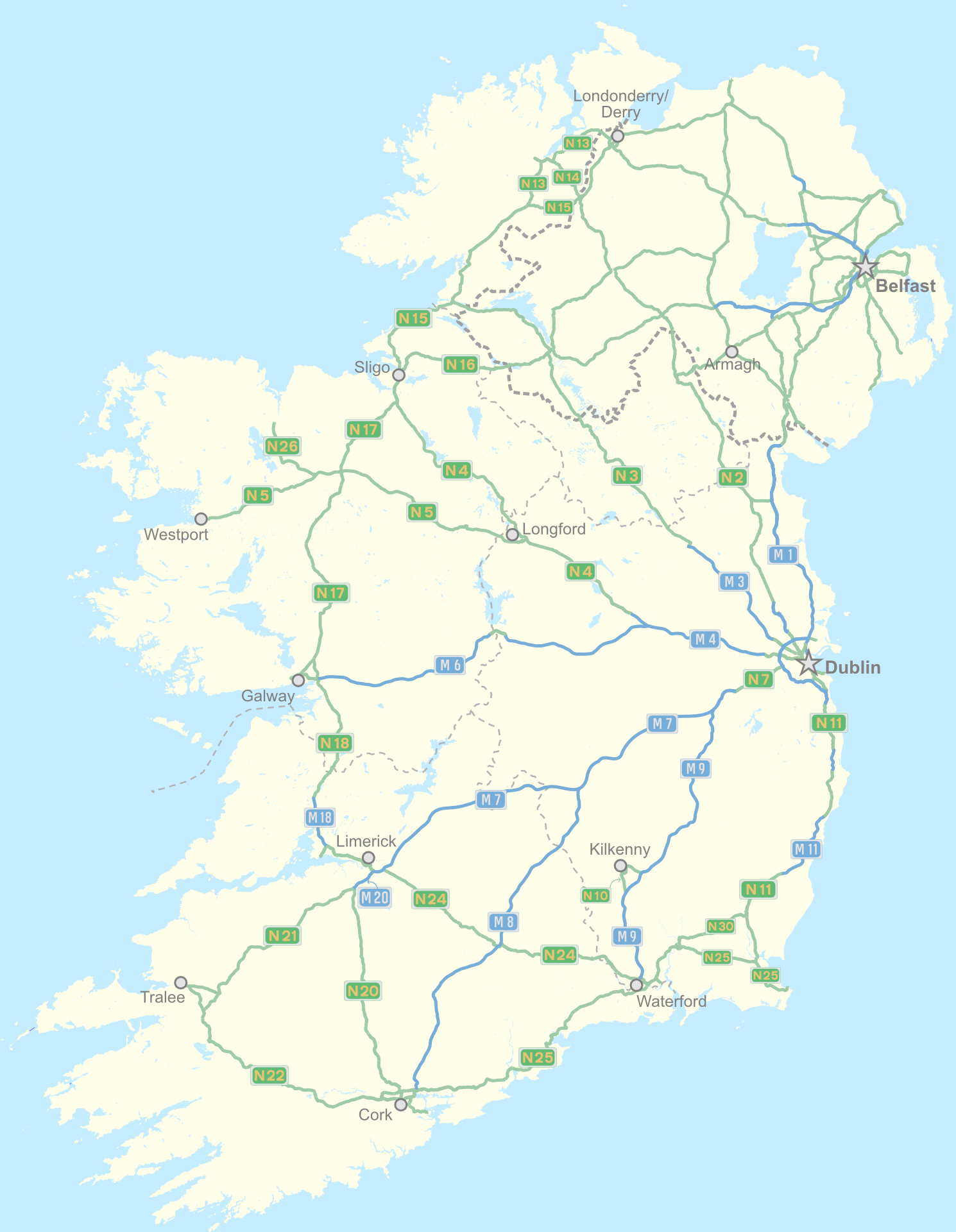
National roads network as of 2010

The current development plan for national routes was incorporated into Transport 21 which set out development objectives, including the completion of the Atlantic Corridor (the Cork to Derry corridor, plus the Cork to Waterford route), to be achieved after 2035. Funding for national roads under the last National Development Plan (2007–2013) was €13.3 billion. As of 31 December 2015, there was a total of 5,306 km of national roads: 2,649 km of national primary routes (including motorways) and 2,657 km of national secondary routes. The total length of the national road network varies annually for different reasons:

- The opening of a new section of road that is classified as a national road thereby replacing the old route
- Re-alignments to existing National Roads
- Changes to the classification of roads.
- Analysis and updating of data contained in the Roads Database

In addition to national roads, Ireland also has an extensive network of other public roads: there are 11,630 kilometres of regional roads and 78,972 kilometres of local roads. These roads were allocated €4.3 billion over the lifetime of the last National Development Plan (2007–2013).

==== Motorways in the Republic of Ireland ====
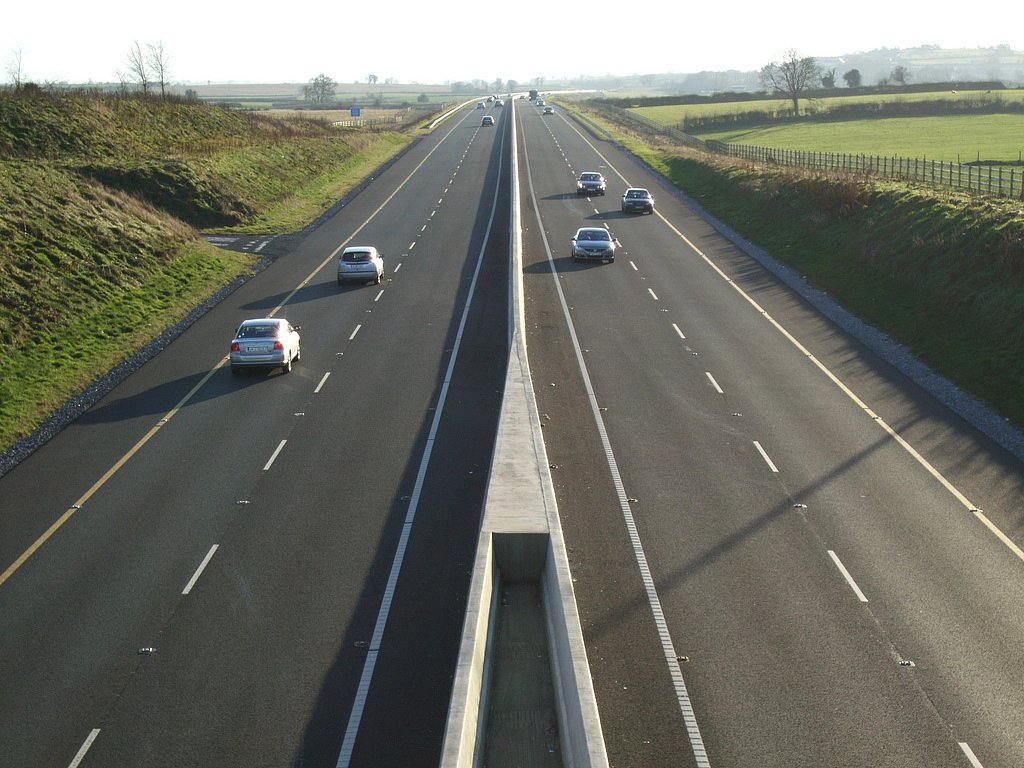
The M8 near New Inn, County Tipperary

The most recent development of the Irish roads network involved the construction of motorways (Irish: mótarbhealach, plural: mótarbhealaí). The first motorway section in the state was the M7 Naas by-pass, which opened in 1983. Several major routes between Dublin (major inter-urban routes) and other cities have been upgraded to motorway standard. Since December 2010, all motorways in Ireland are part of, or form, national primary roads. There was a considerable amount of motorway (and dual carriageway) construction between the years 2000 and 2010: at the end of 2003 there were 176.33 km of motorway in the Republic and 244.79 km of dual carriageway forming part of national roads. By the end of 2004 there were 191.71 km of motorway and 285.49 km of dual carriageway. This was extended, by the end of 2005, to 246.62 km of motorway and 308.4 km of dual carriageway (including 2+1 roads) and to 269.63 km of motorway and 352.91 km of dual carriageway (including 2+1 roads) by the end of 2006. By the end of 2007 there were 269.3 km of motorway, 405.62 km of dual carriageway and 38.99 km of 2+1 road. In 2008, another 125 km of newly constructed motorway were completed and some sections of dual carriageway on national routes were re-designated as motorways. In January 2009, there were 431 km of motorway and dual carriageway under construction with many more schemes at various planning stages; 145 km of newly constructed motorway and dual carriageway were completed in 2009, with another 286 km completed by December 2010. When all these roads were completed by 2010, there were a total of 916 km of motorway, high-quality dual carriageway and 2+2 roads out of approximately 2,649 km of national primary routes, about 45% of the national primary route network.

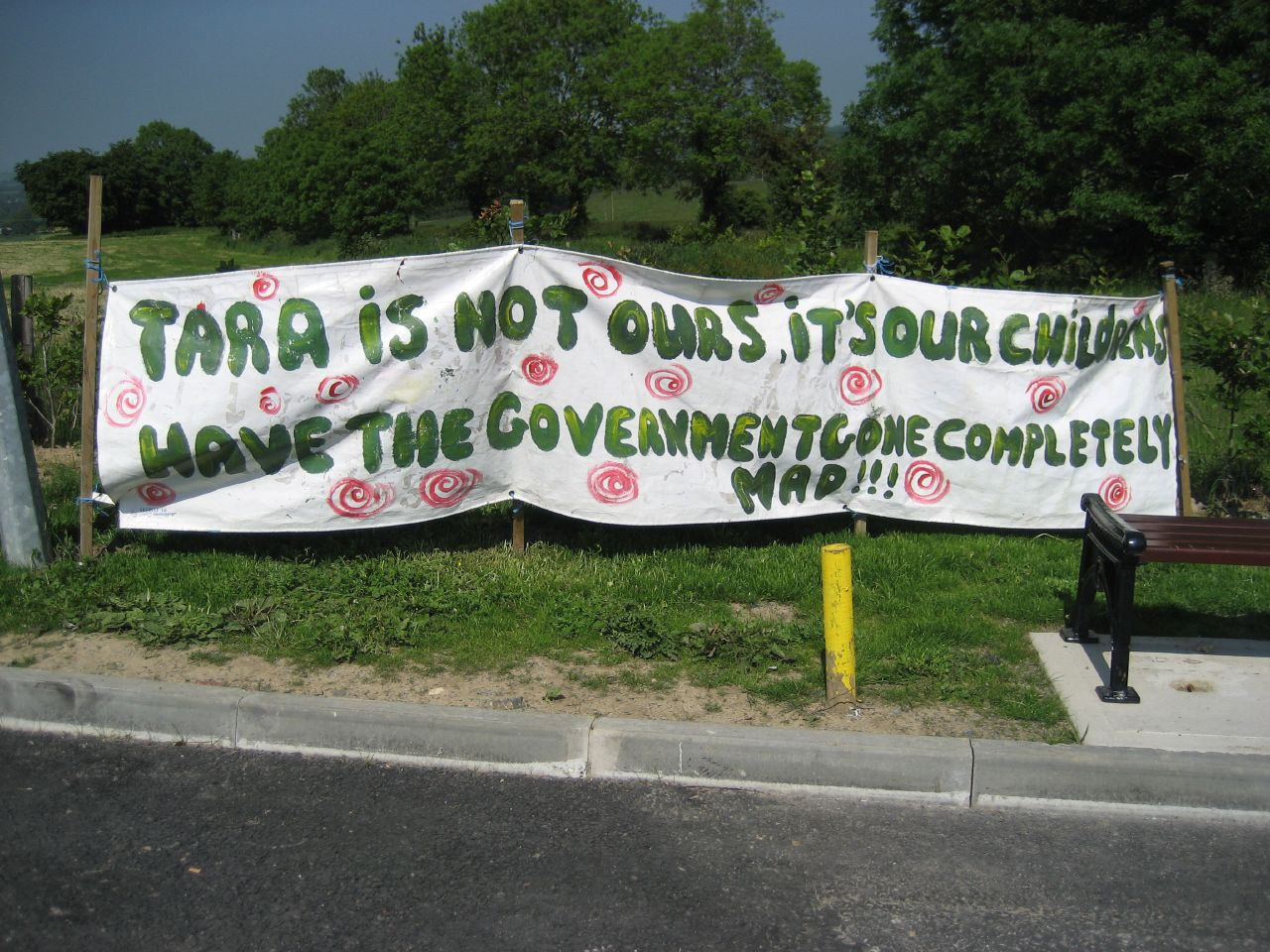
A banner protesting against the construction of the M3 motorway near the Hill of Tara, County Meath

In June 2007, it was announced that around 800 km of roads would be either opened as motorways or re-designated as motorways if already opened under powers granted in the Roads Act 2007. In July 2008, the Roads Act 2007 (Declaration of Motorways) Order 2008 (S.I. No. 279 of 2008) was signed: it redesignated a number of roads, either already open, under construction or proposed, as motorways. A further proposed re-designation of roads was announced in September 2008. In December 2007, it was announced that a planned high quality dual carriageway scheme between Galway and Tuam would be built as a motorway, the first such new motorway project to be announced since the early 2000s. Another new motorway, the M20, is being planned as the main route between Cork and Limerick. The major inter-urban routes, most of the Cork to Tuam section of the Atlantic Corridor along the west coast and other routes will be motorway under these proposals.

In 2019, there was approximately 1,000 km of motorway in Ireland:

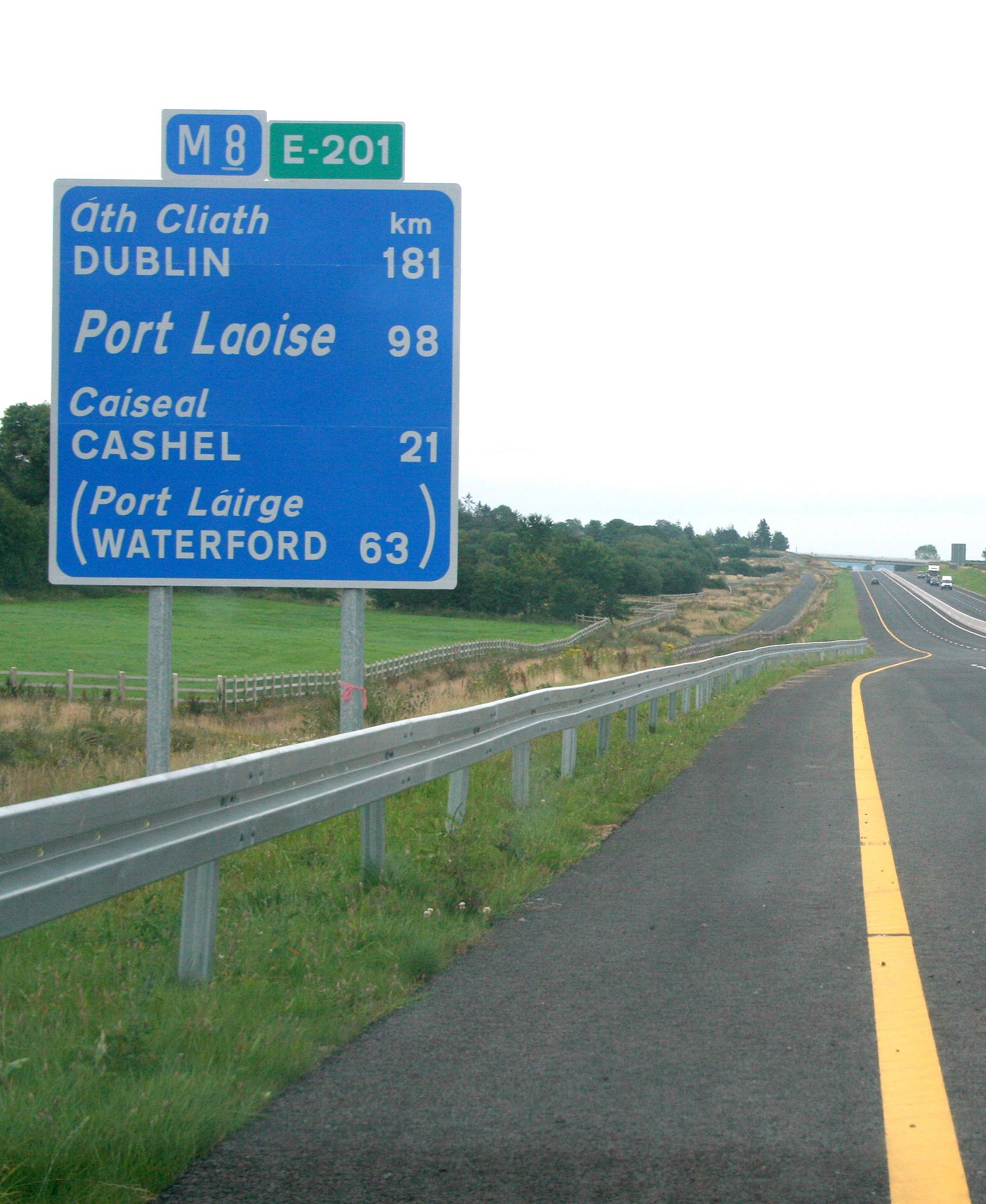
The M8 in County Tipperary with European route number.

Motorway number	Estimated/actual length	Corridor
M1	87 km	Dublin – Dundalk
M2	13 km	Dublin – Ashbourne
M3	51 km	Dublin – Navan
M4	62 km	Lucan – Mullingar
M6	148 km	Kinnegad – Galway
M7	164 km	Dublin – Limerick
M8	147 km	Portlaoise – Cork
M9	119 km	Naas – Waterford
M11	87 km	Dublin – Wexford
M17	25.5 km	Galway – Tuam
M18	70.8 km	Shannon – Galway
M50	45.55 km	Dublin partial orbital
Total	1000 km	National motorway network.

=== Northern Ireland ===
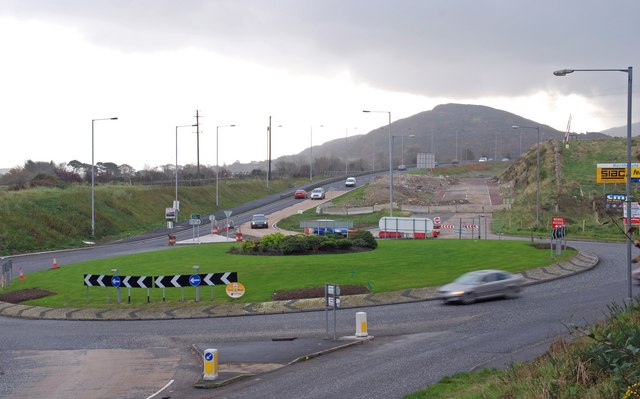
Construction of dual-carriageway on A1 at Cloghogue Roundabout, Newry. Source: Aubrey Dale.

After the partition of Ireland into two states in the 1920s, the road system in Northern Ireland developed very differently from the road system in the Irish Free State (later the Republic of Ireland). A modified version of the British road numbering system was adopted. Numbered roads were initially divided into two classes, A roads and B roads, with motorways being added to the system from the 1960s. In the early 1920s, local authorities in Northern Ireland were given grants from the Roads Board which they used to build new roads and repair and maintain existing roads. The grants were also used to help reduce unemployment by providing work on the roads. Taxes raised through Motor Licence Duties were also used to fund roads. New roads, such as the Great Western Road between Belfast and Antrim were built in the late 1920s and early 1930s. The Newtownards Road in Belfast had 'heavy traffic' in 1935-36 and the design of a bypass (later the Sydenham bypass) was discussed in the Stormont parliament; discussions about the need for a bypass had been going on for ten years. The first motorway in the whole of Ireland, the M1, opened in 1962, fifteen years after plans for its construction were first discussed.

The first dual-carriageway in Northern Ireland was the Sydenham bypass, first begun in 1938 and fully opened in 1959. Northern Ireland's longest dual-carriageway is the A1 which connects Belfast to Newry, continuing south to join the N1 at the border from where it continues mainly as motorway to Dublin. The A1 was gradually converted from single-carriageway to dual-carriageway between 1971 and 2009. The most extensive scheme planned at present is the up-grading of the A5 from Derry to the border at Aughnacoly, County Tyrone from single- to dual-carriageway as part of the A5 Western Transport Corridor. Sixty percent of the funding for this scheme has come from the government of the Republic.

The main roads in Northern Ireland, which connect well with those in the south, are classified "M"/"A"/"B" as in Great Britain. Whereas the roads in Great Britain are numbered according to a zonal system, there is no available explanation for the allocation of road numbers in Northern Ireland, though their numbering is separate from the system in England, Scotland and Wales. Public roads in Northern Ireland are managed by the Roads Service Northern Ireland. The Roads Service is the only roads authority in Northern Ireland and manages around 25,000 kilometres of public roads. The Roads Service was founded in 1996 as an executive agency of the Department of the Environment for Northern Ireland. In 1999, after devolution it became part of the Northern Ireland Department for Regional Development. The Roads Services also operates the Portaferry - Strangford Ferry service across Strangford Lough between the villages of Strangford and Portaferry.

==== Motorways in Northern Ireland ====
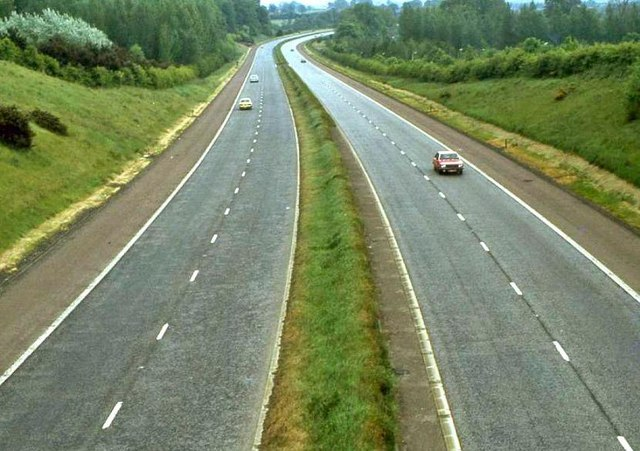
M1 motorway near Dunmurry in 1980. Source: Aubrey Dale.

The most important roads are motorways, designated as in the Republic and Great Britain by the letter "M". The motorway network is focused on Belfast. Plans to develop motorways were first announced by Major J. R. Perceval-Maxwell in the Northern Ireland Ministry of Commerce in 1946. Three 'approach roads', bypassing existing roads, were to be built in the greater Belfast area. In 1956, a modification of the original plans was announced: four motorways were to be built in the greater Belfast area. In 1964, ambitious plans to build a network of motorways throughout Northern Ireland were announced by Northern Ireland Minister of Home Affairs, William Craig. The plans included the construction of the following motorway schemes:

- Belfast Urban Motorway encircling the city centre connecting to the M1, M2, M3 and M4.
- M1: Belfast-Dungannon
- M2: Belfast-Coleraine via Antrim and Ballymena
- M3: Belfast-Bangor
- M4: Belfast (Ormeau Road)-Carryduff
- M5: M2 at Greencastle-Carrickfergus
- M6: M5 at Whiteabbey-Larne
- M7: M3 at Holywood Arches-Dundonald
- M8: M1 at Lagan Valley Park-M4 at Stranmillis
- M11: M1 at Lisburn-Newry.
- M12: Urban Motorway in Portadown/Lurgan (Craigavon new town).
- M22: M2 at Antrim-Castledawson
- M23: M2 near Ballymoney-Derry

Legal authority for motorways existed in the Special Roads Act (Northern Ireland) 1963 (c. 12 (N.I.)), similar to that in the Special Roads Act 1949 in Great Britain. The first motorway to open was the M1 motorway, though it did so under temporary powers until the Special Roads Act had been passed. Work on the motorways continued until the 1970s when the oil crisis and the Troubles both intervened causing the abandonment of many schemes. Only a small number of the motorways planned in 1964 were built: the M1 between Belfast and Dungannon, the M2 between Belfast and Antrim plus Ballymena bypass and the M22 from Antrim to Randalstown. A short section of motorway, called the A8(M), from the M2 towards Larne was also built as were two urban motorways in Belfast, the M5, and the M3 which was the final motorway scheme to open. A short section of the M12 was also built and the A1 from near Lisburn to Newry has been up-graded to dual-carriageway in place of building the M11. The Belfast Urban Motorway was partially built in modified form as the A12 Westlink dual-carriageway. At present, Northern Ireland has 70.3 miles (113.1 km) of motorway.

== See also ==
- Atlantic Corridor
- Corlea Trackway
- Dublin Port Tunnel
- History of road transport
- Jack Lynch Tunnel
- List of Ireland-related topics
- Local roads in Ireland
- Motorways in the Republic of Ireland
- National primary road
- National secondary road
- Northern Irish vehicle registration plates
- Regional road
- Road signs in Ireland
- Road speed limits in the Republic of Ireland
- Roads in Ireland
- Transport in Ireland
- Transport Infrastructure Ireland
- Trunk roads in Ireland
- Vehicle registration plates of the Republic of Ireland
