= Eochaid Faebar Glas =

- High King of Ireland
- Reign: c. 1540–1520 BC
- Coronation: Hill of Tara
- Predecessor: Cermna Finn and Sobairce
- Successor: Fíachu Labrainne
- Born: unknown Ireland
- Died: c. 1520 BC; Ireland
- House: Milesian
- Father: Conmáel
- Mother: unknown
- Religion: Celtic polytheism

Eochaid Faebar Glas, son of Conmáel, was, according to medieval Irish legend and historical tradition, a High King of Ireland. His epithet means "blue-green sharp edge". According to the Lebor Gabála Érenn, Geoffrey Keating's Foras Feasa ar Éirinn and the Annals of the Four Masters, he came to power after killing the joint High King, Cermna Finn, in battle at Dún Cermna (Downmacpatrick in Kinsale, County Cork), and Cermna's brother and colleague Sobairce was killed by Eochaid Menn of the Fomorians (another version of the Lebor Gabála says he came to power at the end of a seven-year interregnum following the death of Tigernmas). He killed Smirgoll, grandson of Tigernmas, in the battle of Druimm Liatháin. He ruled for twenty years, until he was killed by Smirgoll's son Fiacha Labrainne in the battle of Carman. The Lebor Gabála synchronises his reign with that of Piritiades in Assyria. Keating's chronology dates his reign to 1115–1095 BC, that of the Annals of the Four Masters to 1493–1473 BC.

Preceded by Cermna Finn and Sobairce	High King of Ireland; AFM 1493–1473 BC; FFE 1115–1095 BC	Succeeded by Fiacha Labrainne
