= Dunseverick Castle =

Historical ruin in County Antrim, Northern Ireland

- County Antrim, Northern Ireland
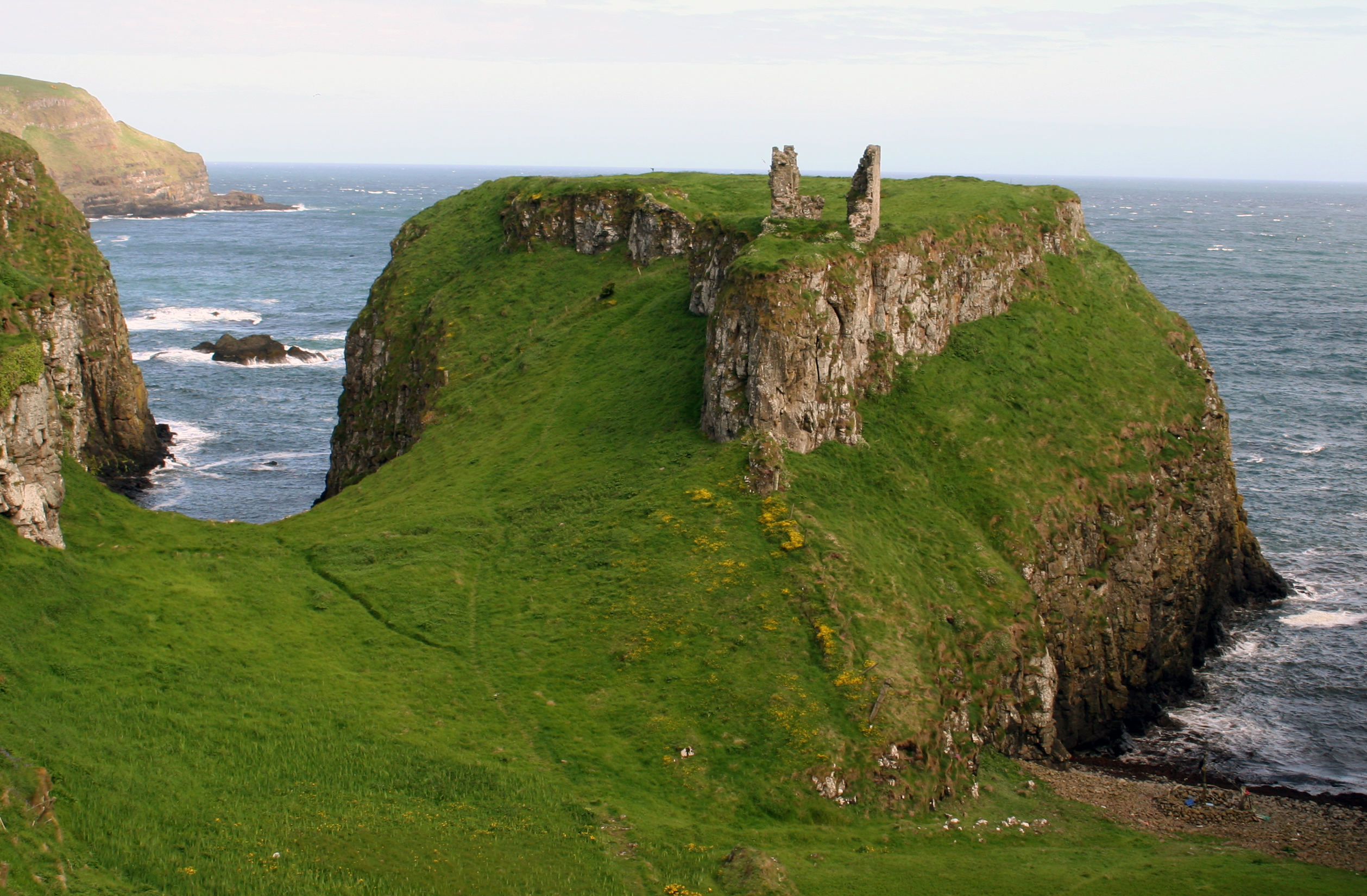
- Dunseverick Castle

Site information
- Type: Castle
- Controlled by: Northern Ireland Environment Agency
- Open to the public: Yes
- Condition: In ruins

Location
- Coordinates: 55.238369°N 6.448230°W

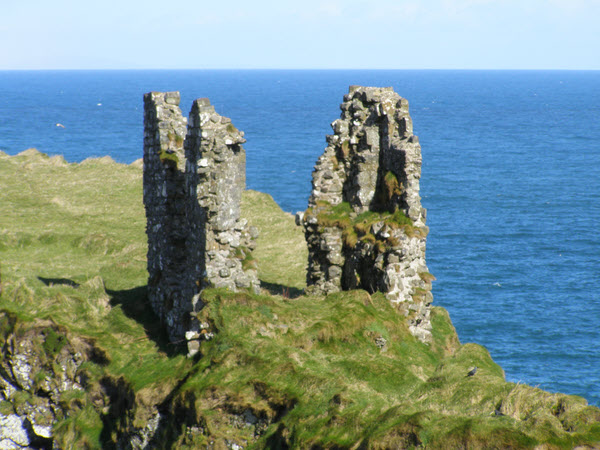
The Gate lodge

Dunseverick Castle is built of basalt and is situated in County Antrim, Northern Ireland, near the small village of Dunseverick and the Giant's Causeway. Dunseverick Castle and earthworks are Scheduled Historic Monuments in the townland of Feigh, in Causeway coast and Glens district council, at grid ref: C9871 4467.

Dunseverick Castle and the peninsula on which it stands were given to the National Trust in 1962 by local farmer Jack McCurdy. The Causeway Cliff Path also runs past on its way to Dunseverick Harbour to the east and to the Giant's Causeway to the west.

== History ==
Traces of an Iron Age promontory fort were found at Dunseverick and it has long been considered the northern terminus of one of the five great roads of Ireland.

Saint Patrick is recorded as having visited Dunseverick castle in the 5th century AD, where he baptized Olcán, a local man who later became a bishop of Ireland. The original stone fort that occupied the position was attacked by Viking raiders in 870 AD.

In the later part of the 6th century AD, this was the seat of Fergus Mor MacEirc (Fergus the Great). Fergus was King of Dalriada and great-uncle of the High King of Ireland, Muirceartaigh (Murtagh) MacEirc. It is the 500 AD departure point from Ireland of the Lia Fail or coronation stone. Murtagh loaned it to Fergus for the latter's coronation in western Scotland part of which Fergus had settled as his sea-kingdom expanded.

It became a manorial centre of the Earls of Ulster from around 1250 to 1350 AD and then a stronghold of the O’Cahans and later the McDonnells from 1560 AD.

The castle was captured and destroyed by General Robert Munro in 1642 and his Cromwellian troops in the 1650s, and today only the ruins of the gatelodge remain. A small residential tower survived until 1978 when it eventually surrendered to the sea below.

It was a 'key' ancient site in Ireland. One of the five great royal highways, or slighe of ancient Ireland, Slige Midluachra, had its terminal point at Dunseverick castle, running from here to Emain Macha and further to Tara and the fording point on the Liffey at what is now Dublin.

== See also ==
- Castles in Northern Ireland
- Media related to Dunseverick Castle at Wikimedia Commons
