= Cermna Finn =

Joint High King of Ireland with his brother Sobairce

- High King of Ireland
- Reign: c. 1560–1540 BC
- Coronation: Hill of Tara
- Predecessor: Eochaid Étgudach
- Successor: Eochaid Faebar Glas
- Born: unknown Ireland
- Died: c. 1540 BC; Ireland
- House: Milesian
- Father: unknown
- Mother: unknown
- Religion: Celtic polytheism

Cermna Finn, son of Ebric and a great, great-grandson of Míl Espáine, was, according to medieval Irish legend and historical tradition, joint High King of Ireland with his brother Sobairce.

The pair came to power after Cermna killed the previous incumbent, Eochaid Étgudach, in battle at Tara. They were the first High Kings to come from the Ulaid. They divided the country between them, the border running from Drogheda to Limerick. Cermna ruled the southern half from Dún Cermna (which Keating identifies as Downmacpatrick in Kinsale, County Cork), Sobairce the northern half from Dún Sobairce (Dunseverick in County Antrim).

They ruled for forty years. Cermna was killed by Eochaid Faebar Glas, son of the previous High King Conmáel, in the battle of Dún Cermna. Sobairce died in the same year at the hands of Eochaid Menn, son of the king of the Fomorians. The Lebor Gabála Érenn synchronises their reign with those of Laosthenes in Assyria and Rehoboam in Judah. The chronology of Geoffrey Keating's Foras Feasa ar Éirinn dates their reign to 1155-1115 BC, that of the Annals of the Four Masters to 1533-1493 BC.

Royal titles
| Preceded by Eochaid Étgudach | High King of Ireland (with Sobairce); AFM 1533-1493 BC; FFE 1155-1115 BC | Succeeded by Eochaid Faebar Glas |
