= Iriel =

Iriel may refer to:

- Íriel Fáid, a legendary High King of Ireland
- Iriel (Dune), a minor character in the novel Hunters of Dune
