= M1 motorway (Northern Ireland) =

Motorway in Northern Ireland connecting Belfast and Dungannon

M1
- M1 highlighted in blue

Route information
- Part of E01 and E18
- Length: 38.0 mi (61.2 km)
- Existed: 1962–present
- History: Constructed 1962–1968

Major junctions
- East end: Belfast
- J11 → M12 Motorway
- West end: Dungannon

Location
- Country: United Kingdom
- Constituent country: Northern Ireland
- Primary destinations: Lisburn, Lurgan, Craigavon, Portadown, Dungannon

Road network
- Roads in Northern Ireland; Motorways; A roads in Northern Ireland
← A12	→ A4

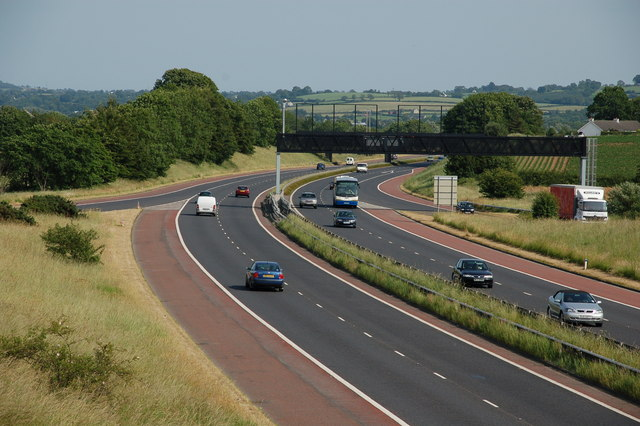
View east from the bridge at junction 9.

The M1 is a motorway in Northern Ireland. It is the longest motorway in Northern Ireland and runs for 38 miles (61 km) from Belfast to Dungannon through County Antrim, County Down, County Armagh and County Tyrone. It forms part of the route via the A1 in Northern Ireland (N1/M1 in the Republic of Ireland) between Belfast and Dublin as well as being a part of the unsigned European E01 and E18 routes.

== Route ==
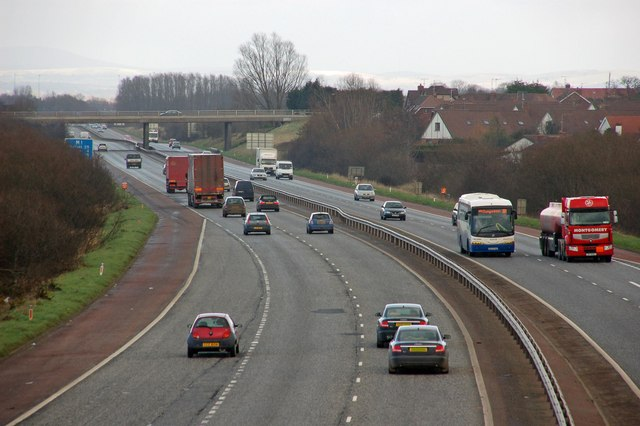
M1-M12, near Portadown

The road begins at the Broadway roundabout to the west of Windsor Park and running parallel to the Blackstaff River. Heading south as a dual three–lane motorway, it passes to the east of Casement Park. Running through Dunmurry and Ballyskeagh it arrives to the south of Lisburn. Traffic for Dublin leaves at junctions 7 and 8 as the motorway enters the countryside. Now heading west past Aghnatrisk it runs parallel to and then crosses the Belfast-Dublin Railway Line followed by the River Lagan before reaching Moira. Continuing west, it passes between Killaghy and Tullydagan and to the north of Lurgan and Turmoyra, across the Pound River, south of Lough Neagh, before its junction with the M12 at Craigavon. Crossing the River Bann it then enters a relatively unpopulated area. It passes south of Derryadd Lough and runs in a loop around the Annagarriff Nature Reserve before crossing the River Blackwater, skirting to the north of Tamnamore and Laghey Corner before ending at Dungannon on the A4.

== History ==
The line of the M1 in Belfast had been planned for a road since 1946 as the Southern Approach Road, though there were some disagreements on the route. County planners in Armagh had also been working on plans to rebuild the then T3 trunk road which suffered from poor alignments, limited speed limits and was of failing construction, some work on which had been undertaken between 1955 and 1957. These two plans were eventually upgraded into plans for the M1 by 1958. Construction began 1957 on the first bridge and subsequently the first section of the motorway. In 1964, the Northern Ireland Government announced plans for an extensive route of motorways which saw the M1 now planned to go to Dungannon. The M1 is the only motorway in Northern Ireland completed to its full planned length.

The road was constructed in stages between 1962 and 1968: Prior to the opening the RUC traffic division ran a publicity campaign to educate drivers on how to drive on a motorway. At the end of 1965 UK Transport Minister Tom Fraser and his successor Barbara Castle imposed a blanket 70 mph (113 km/h) speed limit on motorways in Great Britain, but the recently constructed Northern Ireland M1 remained free of a blanket speed limit for several years.

- Junctions 1 to 6 opened on 10 July 1962

The motorway follows the route of the former Lagan Canal between junctions 2 and 6. The first user of the road was a motorcyclist, Robert McFall of Belfast. The section between Junctions 1 and 3 was subsequently widened to three lanes in each direction.

- Junctions 6 to 7 opened on 15 December 1963
- Junctions 7 to 9 opened on 6 December 1965
- Junctions 9 to 10 opened on 28 February 1966
- Junctions 10 to 11 opened on 27 November 1967
- Junctions 11 to 12 opened on 29 January 1968
- Junctions 12 to 13 opened on 1 December 1964
- Junctions 13 to 15 opened on 23 December 1967

Junctions 12 to 15 were constructed across a peat bog which is up to 12 metres deep. This required the removal of 3.4 million cubic metres of peat.

Several junctions were omitted from the original construction, as these were for future planned motorways. Some of these have now been used for other road plans:

- Junction 3 was opened in 1988.
- Junction 8 was opened in 2003. This provides access to the A1 in both directions, whilst junction 7 had its slip roads facing west closed. Junction 8 had originally been planned for a different location for the M11 motorway to relieve the A1 towards the border with the Republic of Ireland.

The M1 is straight and flat on the 6-mile (9.7 km) stretch between Junctions 9 and 10 and on the 4-mile (6.4 km) stretch between Junctions 12 and 13, and an urban myth exists claiming that these were to be used as supplementary runways by the United States Air Force in the event of a major conflict with the Soviet Union.

By the mid-2000s the M1 in Belfast had high traffic flows at peak times and suffered from congestion. To relieve this, work commenced early in 2006 to replace the roundabout at junction 1 with a fully grade separated junction through which the M1 now flows directly onto the A12 Westlink dual carriageway. As part of the scheme, the M1 was widened from two to three lanes in each direction between Junctions 1 and 2 along with part of the Westlink.

Work was also carried out on the A4 which begins at the terminus of the M1 between Dungannon and Ballygawley (approximately 12.5 miles (20.1 km)) was upgraded to dual carriageway standard, opening in November 2010.

In 2011 the government announced plans for two service areas in each direction between junction 3 and junction 6 near Ballyskeagh. These service stations are the first motorway service stations in Northern Ireland. They include petrol stations and restaurant facilities. Construction on the westbound service area began in November 2013 and was opened on 10 March 2016. Work on the eastbound service area began in April 2016 and was opened on 2 February 2017.

== Future improvements ==
In 2006, the government announced plans for a £45m flyover link directly to and from the A1 and M1 eastbound. Construction was initially estimated to take place between 2010 and 2015. As of June 2016, the scheme has no projected completion date. The government also have plans to add west facing slip roads at junction 3. Junction 3 opened in 1988 with only east facing slip roads. Construction on the west facing slip roads is subject to future budget settlements.

== Junctions ==
M1 motorway
Eastbound exits	Junction	Westbound exits
End of motorway A12 dual carriageway continues The NORTH (M2), (M3), City Centre, Airports Docks A12; Belfast (W), (S)	J1	Start of motorway
Outer Ring, Newtownards, King's Hall A55	J2	Outer Ring, Newtownards, King's Hall A55
No access	J3	Dunmurry, Finaghy A1
Lisburn services	Services	Lisburn services
Lisburn (City centre), Saintfield A49	J6	Lisburn (City centre), Saintfield A49
No access	J7	Lisburn, Sprucefield A1
The SOUTH, Dublin, Sprucefield A101 (A1)	J8	The SOUTH Dublin, Newry A101 (A1)
Moira A3 Antrim A26 International Airport	J9	International Airport Antrim A26 Moira A3
Craigavon (Lurgan) A76	J10	Craigavon (Lurgan) A76
Craigavon (Portadown), Armagh M12	J11	Craigavon, Portadown M12
Craigavon (Portadown) A4	J12	Craigavon (Portadown) A4
Loughgall B131	J13	Loughgall B131
Moy B106 Tamnamore Services (in planning), Coalisland A45	J14	Tamnamore Services (in planning), Coalisland A45 Moy B106
Start of motorway	J15	End of motorway A4 dual carriageway continues Enniskillen, Omagh A4; Armagh, Dungannon, Moygashel A29

Note: There is no junction 4 or 5, these were to be built for since-cancelled schemes such as the M11 from Newry and the M8 from Belfast

== See also ==
- A4 road (Northern Ireland)
- List of motorways in the United Kingdom
- Roads in Ireland
- Westlink Belfast
