= Tigernmas =

Legendary Irish king

- High King of Ireland
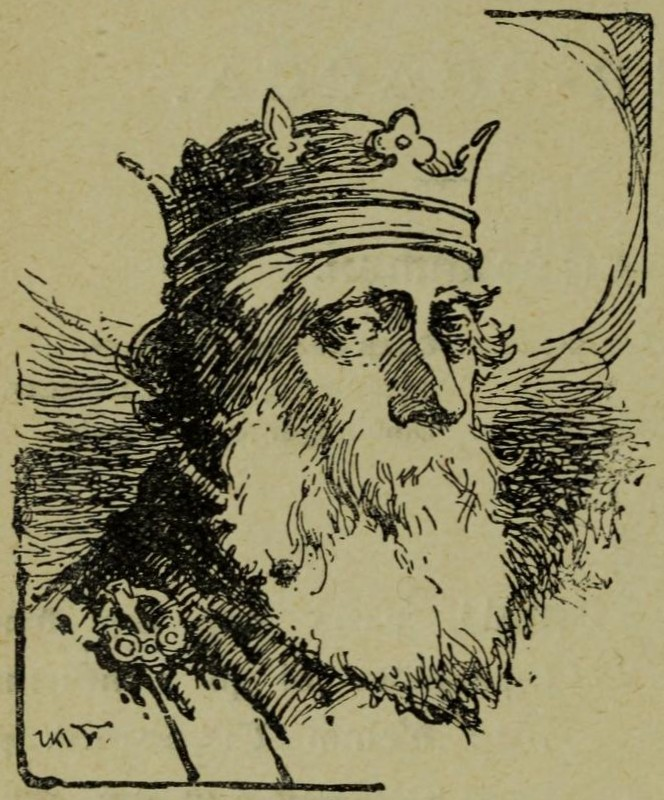
- Tigernmas (Seóirse Ua Fágáin, 1904)
- Reign: 1209–1159 BC (Foras Feasa ar Éirinn)
- Predecessor: Conmáel
- Successor: Eochaid Étgudach
- Died: 1159 BC
- House: Érimón

Tigernmas, son of Follach, son of Ethriel, a descendant of Érimón, was, according to medieval Irish legend and historical traditions, an early High King of Ireland.

According to the Lebor Gabála Érenn he became king when he overthrew his predecessor Conmáel in the Battle of Óenach Macha, and within a year of his accession had won twenty-seven battles against the descendants of Eber Finn, almost completely destroying Eber's line. It is said that during his reign gold was first smelted in Ireland, by the wright Iuchadán. Tigernmas was the first king to give drinking-horns to his followers, and the first to have clothes dyed purple, blue and green and decorated with brooches, fringes and ornaments. Seven lakes and three rivers burst from the ground during his reign. After reigning for seventy-seven years (or 100 years according to the Book of Fenagh, P 23), he and three-quarters of the men of Ireland died on Magh Slécht while worshipping Crom Cruach, a cruel deity propitiated with human sacrifice. According to the Annals of the Four Masters, Ireland was without a High King for seven years after his death, before Eochaid Étgudach took the kingship.

The Lebor Gabála synchronises his reign with the deaths of Thineas and Decylas, kings of Assyria, and the reigns of David and Solomon in Israel; the Laud Synchronisms with the Judean kings Asa and Jehoshaphat and the Assyrian king Pertiades (Pyriatides) 985 B.C. The Annals of the Four Masters dates his reign to 1621–1544 BC; Geoffrey Keating to 1209–1159 BC.

Preceded by Conmael	High King of Ireland; AFM 1621–1544 BC; FFE 1209–1159 BC	Succeeded by Eochaid Étgudach
