= Eochaid Étgudach =

- High King of Ireland
- Reign: c. 1580–1560 BC
- Coronation: Hill of Tara
- Predecessor: Tigernmas
- Successor: Cermna Finn and Sobairce
- Born: unknown Ireland
- Died: c. 1560 BC; Ireland
- House: Milesian
- Father: unknown
- Mother: unknown
- Religion: Celtic polytheism

Eochaid or Eochu Étgudach ('possessing clothes') or Etgedach ('negligent'?), son of Dáire Doimthech, son of Conghal, son of Eadaman, son of Mal, son of Lugaid, son of Íth, son of Breogán, was, according to medieval Irish legend and historical tradition, a High King of Ireland. According to the Lebor Gabála Érenn he was chosen as king by the remaining quarter of the men of Ireland after the other three-quarters had died with the former king, Tigernmas, while worshipping the deity Crom Cruach. He introduced a system whereby the number of colours a man could wear in his clothes depended on his social rank, from one colour for a slave to seven for a king or queen. He ruled for four years, until he was killed in battle at Tara by Cermna Finn, who succeeded to the throne jointly with his brother Sobairce. His reign is synchronised with that of Eupales in Assyria. The chronology of Geoffrey Keating's Foras Feasa ar Éirinn dates his reign to 1159–1155 BC, that of the Annals of the Four Masters (which adds that there was a seven-year interregnum between Tigernmas' death and Eochaid's accession) to 1537–1533 BC.

== Important notes ==
Eochaid Étgudach is a son of Daire Doimthech, son of Conghal. His father, Daire Doimthech, should not be confused with another different person, also called Dáire Doimthech, who was a son of Sithbolg, and was a legendary King of Tara.

Preceded by Tigernmas	High King of Ireland; AFM 1537–1533 BC; FFE 1159–1155 BC	Succeeded by Sobairce and Cermna Finn
