= Sprucefield =

- retail park
- Location within the United Kingdom
- Coordinates: 54.491°N 6.058°W

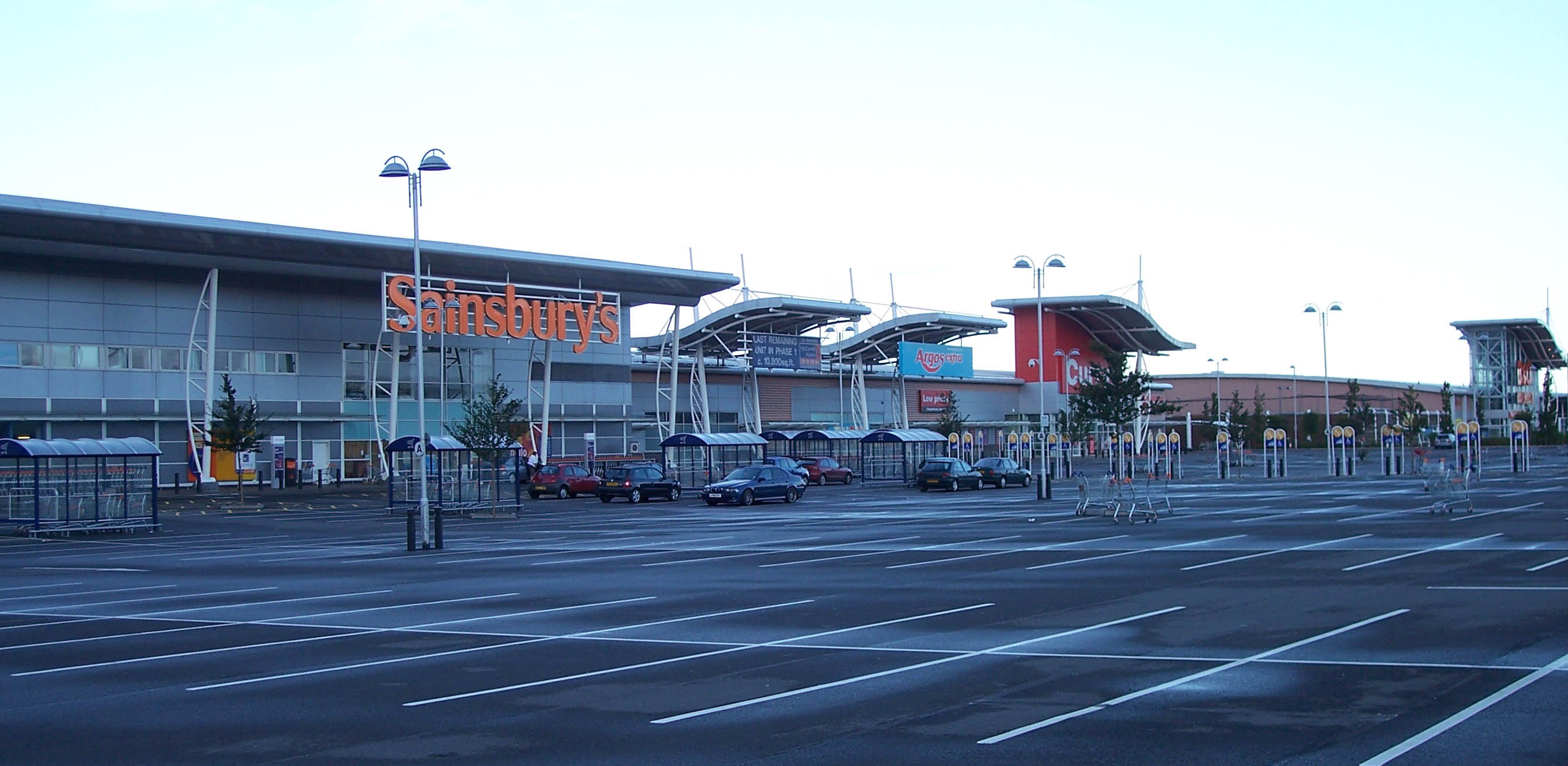
Sprucefield Park complex

Sprucefield is a major out-of-town retail park in the townland of Magherageery, County Down, Northern Ireland. It is on the southern edge of Lisburn; about one mile from Lisburn city centre, and ten miles (16 km) from central Belfast. Sprucefield is located beside the M1 motorway and the A1 road. It is split in two parts: the Sprucefield Centre and Sprucefield Park.

Sprucefield is also the site of the Lisnagarvey transmitting station.

== Sprucefield Centre ==
Sprucefield Centre was developed by Marks and Spencer on the site of Lisnagarvey Hockey Club and opened in March 1989. The proximity to the radio transmitter required the centre to be built as a Faraday cage to protect electronic equipment from the mast's electromagnetic field. Sprucefield Centre includes shops such as Marks and Spencer, Next, Pets At Home, Boots and McDonald's.

The centre was virtually destroyed in January 1991 in an IRA incendiary attack. Three of four stores were destroyed, (MFI, Allied Maples and Texas), while the Marks and Spencer wing suffered only water damage.

An expansion of Marks and Spencer has been reported for many years. An outline planning application was submitted in 1995, followed by a public inquiry in 1999. The Planning Service recommended the proposal be accepted. If built the extension calls for the demolition and resiting of the transmitter station, although these plans never went ahead. In August 2007, Marks and Spencer opened a large homeware section (second largest in the UK after Manchester) on the Sprucefield site in what had been the adjoining Homebase shop. Homebase's lease on the building was not renewed by M&S who own the entire complex. M&S also upgraded its anchor store with a new café, better lighting and customer friendly walkways. The expansion of their Sprucefield store makes it the largest store in Ireland and the third largest in the United Kingdom. In April 2016 Marks and Spencer reported that their Lisburn Sprucefield store recorded the highest food sales of any of their UK stores making it the most profitable store in the M&S network.

== Sprucefield Park ==
Sprucefield Park was opened in 2003, with Sainsbury's and B&Q as anchor tenants. There are four smaller units, occupied by B&M and The Range. The 21,500 m^{2} (231,000 ft^{2}) project was managed by a Stannifer/Snoddons Construction joint venture. Stannifer is a British property development company, while the latter is a construction company based in Hillsborough, County Down. Construction was carried out by McLaughlin & Harvey. Stannifer took ownership of the site, while it retained a 50% share of the proposed second phase. In 2004 The Westfield Group acquired Stannifer's parent (Chelsfield) and took control of the company's shares in Sprucefield Park.

Sprucefield Park (like the Sprucefield Centre) has faced major objections at almost every stage. Sainsbury's announced its move into Northern Ireland on 20 June 1995 and opened its first stores in 1997, however it would be eight years before its Sprucefield store was opened. An application for outline planning permission was submitted in July 1998 and final permission was granted in February 2001. The planning permission for the centre also included a multiplex cinema and a 150-bed hotel, however these have yet to be built. Lisnagarvey Hockey Club, which sold its pitches to Marks and Spencer for its development in 1989, had again to relocate when it sold its pitches to the developers of Sprucefield Park.

In December 2004 the B&Q store was extensively damaged by an incendiary device. The store was closed for approximately six months. In January 2005 another firebomb was discovered in the centre's Sainsbury's store, however this was successfully defused. Both incidents, and others such as the destruction of a Next store at Forestside Shopping Centre in Belfast, were blamed on dissident republicans.

In September 2015 B&Q announced that its Sprucefield branch was one of five Northern Ireland stores that it would close. However the store remained open.

In October 2022 German retailer Lidl announced its intention to open a branch at the retail park. In August 2023, The Range announced its intention to open a branch at the retail park in September, in the former Toys "R" Us unit.

In 2024, Argos and Next Home closed their doors, Argos moved into the Sainsbury's supermarket.

=== Second phase ===
In June 2004 the developers announced plans for a 220,000 sq ft (20,000 m^{2}) John Lewis department store and 29 additional units on the site. Despite objections from Lisburn retailers and the Belfast Chamber of Commerce the development was given approval in June 2005 by then Northern Ireland Environment Minister Jeff Rooker. However, in October 2005 six parties opposed to the development won the right to seek a judicial review of the planning permission. These parties were Belfast City Council, Belfast Chamber of Trade and Commerce, Lisburn Chamber of Commerce, the owners of Lisburn's Bow Street Mall, Central Craigavon Limited and AM Developments Limited (AM Developments is building the Victoria Square centre in Belfast city centre). On 10 May 2006 the appeal was upheld, effectively removing planning permission. However, the judge, Mr Justice Girvan, said he was not ruling on the merits of the store itself, rather on the way the decision to grant permission was taken. This allowed a new planning application to be submitted.

Westfield and Snoddens' reaffirmed their commitment to pursuing planning permission in November 2006 after a new legal challenge by Central Craigavon Ltd., owners of the Rushmere Shopping Centre. Westfield detailed its new planning application on 26 August 2008. The number of additional retail units planned was reduced from 29 to 19, however the developers conceded that the proposal is "ostensibly the same" at a total floor space of approximately 50,000 square metres (540,000 square feet).

In March 2014 Westfield agreed to sell Sprucefield Park to Intu Properties plc for £70 million. It was also owned by PIMCO (90% stake) and NewRiver (10%).

In 2023, an expansion plan was discussed again, which would include more retail space, a hotel and three restaurants. The first phase, which includes the restaurants, will begin to open by October 2024.

In 2025, NewRiver and PIMCO sold the retail park to Realty Income.
