= Ethriel =

Legendary High King of Ireland

- High King of Ireland
- Reign: c. 1640–1620 BC
- Coronation: Hill of Tara
- Predecessor: Íriel Fáid
- Successor: Conmáel
- Born: unknown Ireland
- Died: c. 1620 BC; Ireland
- House: Milesian
- Father: Íriel Fáid
- Mother: unknown
- Religion: Celtic polytheism

Ethriel, son of Íriel Fáid, according to medieval Irish legends and historical traditions, succeeded his father as High King of Ireland. During his reign he cleared six plains. He ruled for twenty years, until he was killed in the Battle of Rairiu by Conmáel in revenge for his father Éber Finn, who had been killed by Ethriel's grandfather Érimón. He was the last of the chieftains who arrived in the invasion of the sons of Míl to rule Ireland. The Lebor Gabála Érenn says that during his reign Tautanes, king of Assyria, died (1182 BC according to Jerome's Chronicon), as did Hector and Achilles (the Trojan War is usually dated to the 13th century BC), and Samson was king of the Tribe of Dan in ancient Israel. Geoffrey Keating dates his reign from 1259 to 1239 BC, the Annals of the Four Masters from 1671 to 1651 BC.

Preceded by Íriel Fáid	High King of Ireland; LGE c. 1182 BC/13th Century BC; FFE 1259–1239 BC; AFM 1671–1651 BC	Succeeded by Conmáel
