= M12 motorway =

Road in Northern Ireland

M12
- M12 highlighted in blue

Route information
- Length: 1.5 mi (2.4 km)
- Existed: 1970–present
- History: Constructed 1970–1991

Major junctions
- North end: Kilvergan – M1
- J1 → M1 Motorway
- South end: Drumnagoon – A3 Northway

Location
- Country: United Kingdom
- Constituent country: Northern Ireland
- Primary destinations: Craigavon, Portadown

Road network
- Roads in Northern Ireland; Motorways; A roads in Northern Ireland

The M12 is a 1 1/2 miles (2.4 km) length of spur motorway in County Armagh, Northern Ireland. It was opened in 1970.

It leads off the main M1 motorway, to Portadown, part of the conurbation of Portadown-Craigavon-Lurgan, and forms most of the route between junction 11 of the M1 (Ballynacor) and the A3 Northway at Kernan Loop. The road forms part of European route E18.

== History ==
The M12 is a legacy from the 1960s plan to develop the Craigavon new town. The M1 motorway was originally intended to run between Belfast, and the area that is now Craigavon. By the early 1960s, the M1 project had been extended further westwards to reach Dungannon, and the M12 was planned to connect Craigavon to the M1. The junction between the M12 and M1 originally had slip roads for traffic to and from Belfast only, but a bridge was built as part of the project for completion of the junction as full access.

Construction on the new Brownlow suburb of the town began in the late 1960s but by the 1980s it was clear that, due to overestimated population predictions, the new town had largely failed and construction on the remaining three suburbs never took place. The original plan to upgrade the Northway to motorway standard and give it free-flow connections to the M12 has consequently never happened.

The single-carriageway link road connecting it to the A3 was completed in 1970. West-facing connections to the M1 were added in 1990. The east and west sliproads now meet at an at-grade roundabout which was designated junction 1. The Carn junction was re-numbered junction 2 at this time.

== Junctions ==
M12 motorway
Northeastbound exits	Junction	Southwestbound exits
End of motorway Belfast, The West, Dungannon M1	1	Start of motorway
Start of motorway	2	End of motorway Craigavon centre, Portadown, Armagh A3; Carn, Seagoe B2

== See also ==
- List of motorways in the United Kingdom
- Roads in Ireland
