= A1 road (Northern Ireland) =

Major route in Northern Ireland

Coordinates: 54.39665°N 6.17586°W

A1

Route information
- Part of E01
- Length: 42.5 mi (68.4 km)
- History: Dualling from Sprucefield to the border took place between 1971 and July 2010.

Major junctions
- North end: Belfast
- A3 in Lisburn; M1 Junction 7 at Sprucefield; A26 and A50 at Banbridge; A2, A25, A27 and A28 at Newry
- South end: Near Meigh, south of Newry at border with the Republic. Becomes M1.

Location
- Country: United Kingdom
- Constituent country: Northern Ireland
- Primary destinations: Dunmurry; Lisburn; Sprucefield; Hillsborough; Dromore; Banbridge; Loughbrickland; Newry

Road network
- Roads in Northern Ireland; Motorways; A roads in Northern Ireland

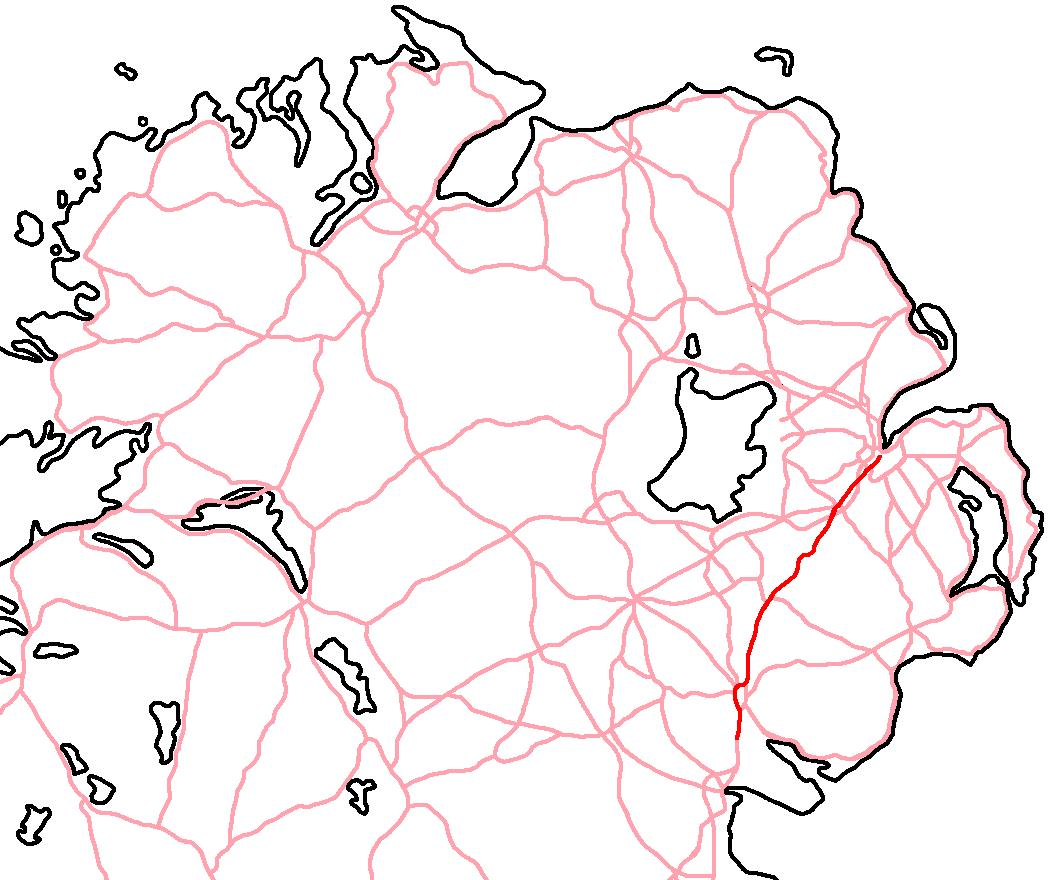
The route of the A1 in red from Belfast city centre (County Antrim) to the border at Carrickcarnan (County Louth)

The A1 is a major route in Northern Ireland. It runs from Belfast via Lisburn and Banbridge to the border with the Republic of Ireland south of Newry, from where the road continues to Dublin, becoming the N1 road and M1 motorway. Between Sprucefield and Carrickcarnan the road forms part of the European route E01.

== Recent developments ==
The A1 is a dual carriageway south from Sprucefield but some junctions remain relatively low specification as they necessitate right-turning movements across the central reservation. The busier junctions have been improved by the provision of bridges or underpasses.

A flyover was constructed at the busy Rathfriland Road junction in Banbridge and an underpass at the very dangerous Hillsborough road junction in Dromore was completed in June 2005.

Improved junctions at Banbridge and Hillsborough opened in September 2009, at Loughbrickland in December 2009 and at Banbridge Road, Dromore in February 2010.

The scheme involving the dualling of the A1 between Beech Hill and Cloghogue was completed in July 2010, five months ahead of schedule.

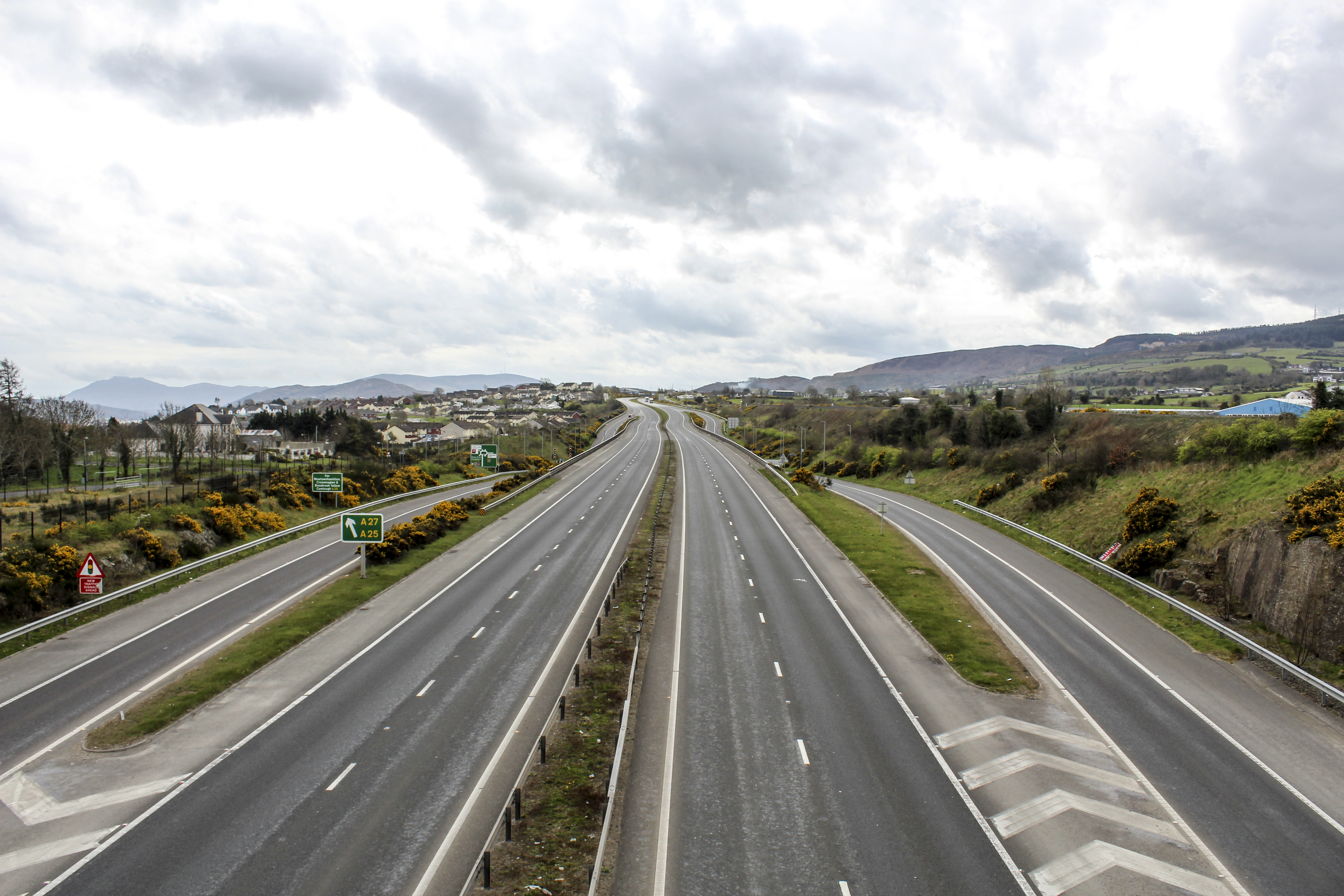
A deserted A1 during the COVID-19 pandemic in Northern Ireland, 2020

== Planned developments ==
The Roads Service of Northern Ireland has planned to provide four further grade separated junctions. These schemes are located at:

- Listullycurran Road, between Dromore and Hillsborough
- Gowdystown Road, south of Dromore
- Skeltons Road, between Dromore and Banbridge
- Waringsford Road, north of Banbridge.

Further measures envisaged to improve safety include a central reservation safety barrier to be constructed from the A1's junction with the M1 at Sprucefield to Loughbrickland. This will involve the closing of many of the dual carriageway's central cross-over points.

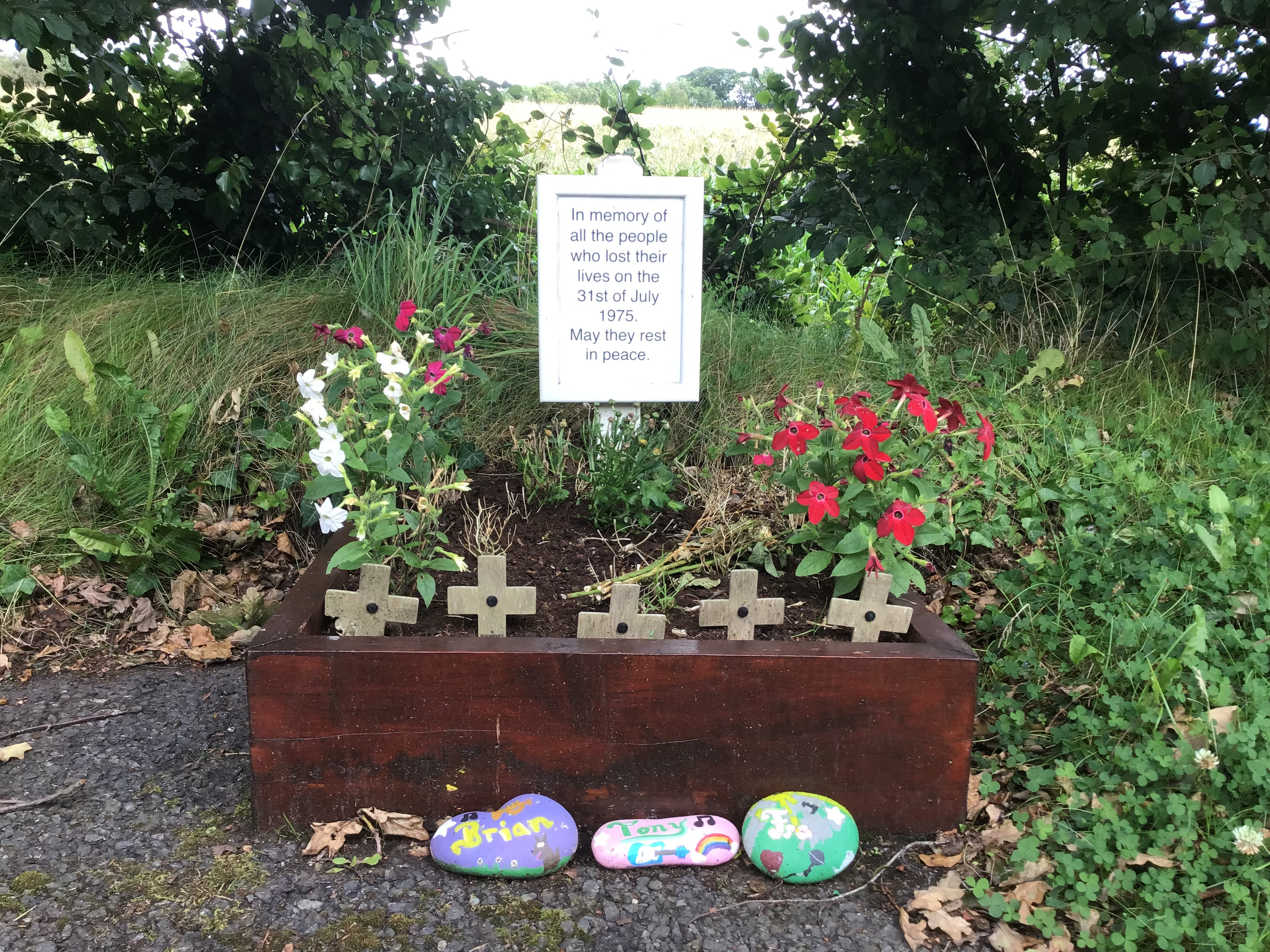
The small memorial on the disused part of the A1, the scene of the Miami Showband Massacre.

The Road Service also plan to improve the link between the M1 and A1 at Sprucefield in a scheme that would include a flyover at Hillsborough, replacing the last remaining roundabout on the route between Dublin and Belfast.

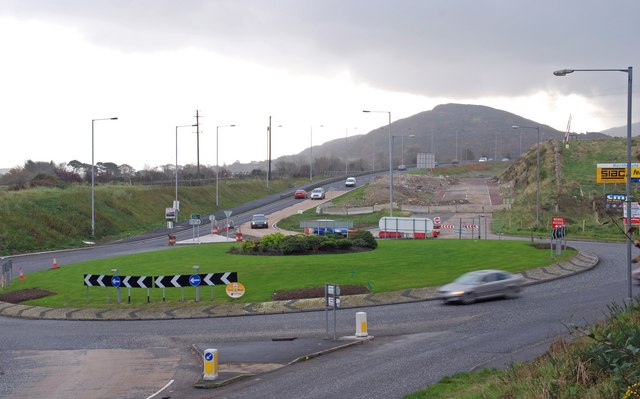
Dualling roadworks at the Cloghogue roundabout on the A1 road, Newry, Northern Ireland in November 2007.

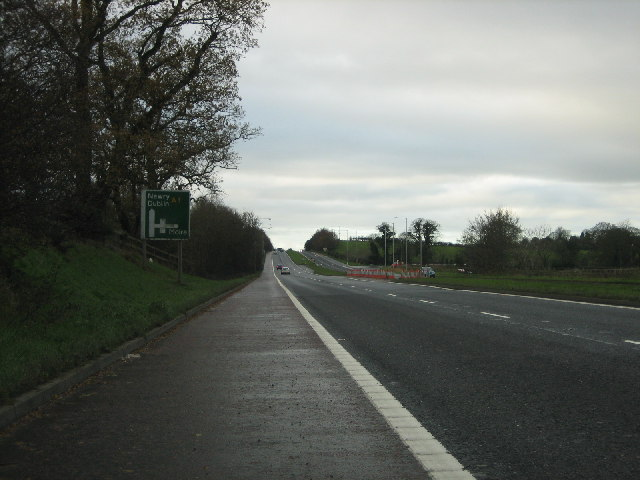
A1 looking south just before the right-hand turn for Moira in December 2005.

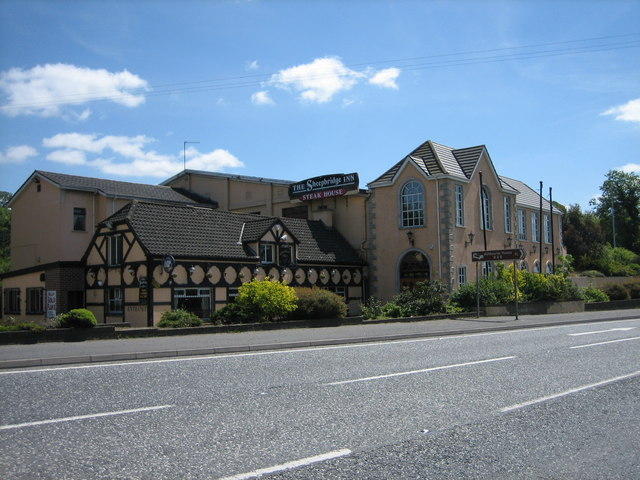
The Sheepbridge Inn, located on the last remaining single-carriageway stretch of the A1, in June 2006.
