= Belfast Airport =

Belfast Airport may refer to:

- Belfast International Airport, serving Belfast, Northern Ireland, an international leisure airport
- George Best Belfast City Airport, serving Belfast, Northern Ireland, a smaller airport closer to Belfast City Centre
