= Dunseverick =

Hamlet in County Antrim, Northern Ireland

Dunseverick (alias Feigh) Irish: Dún Sobhairce (Faithche)
- townland

Irish transcription(s)
  - Derivation: Dún Sobhairce
  - Meaning: Sobhairce's fort
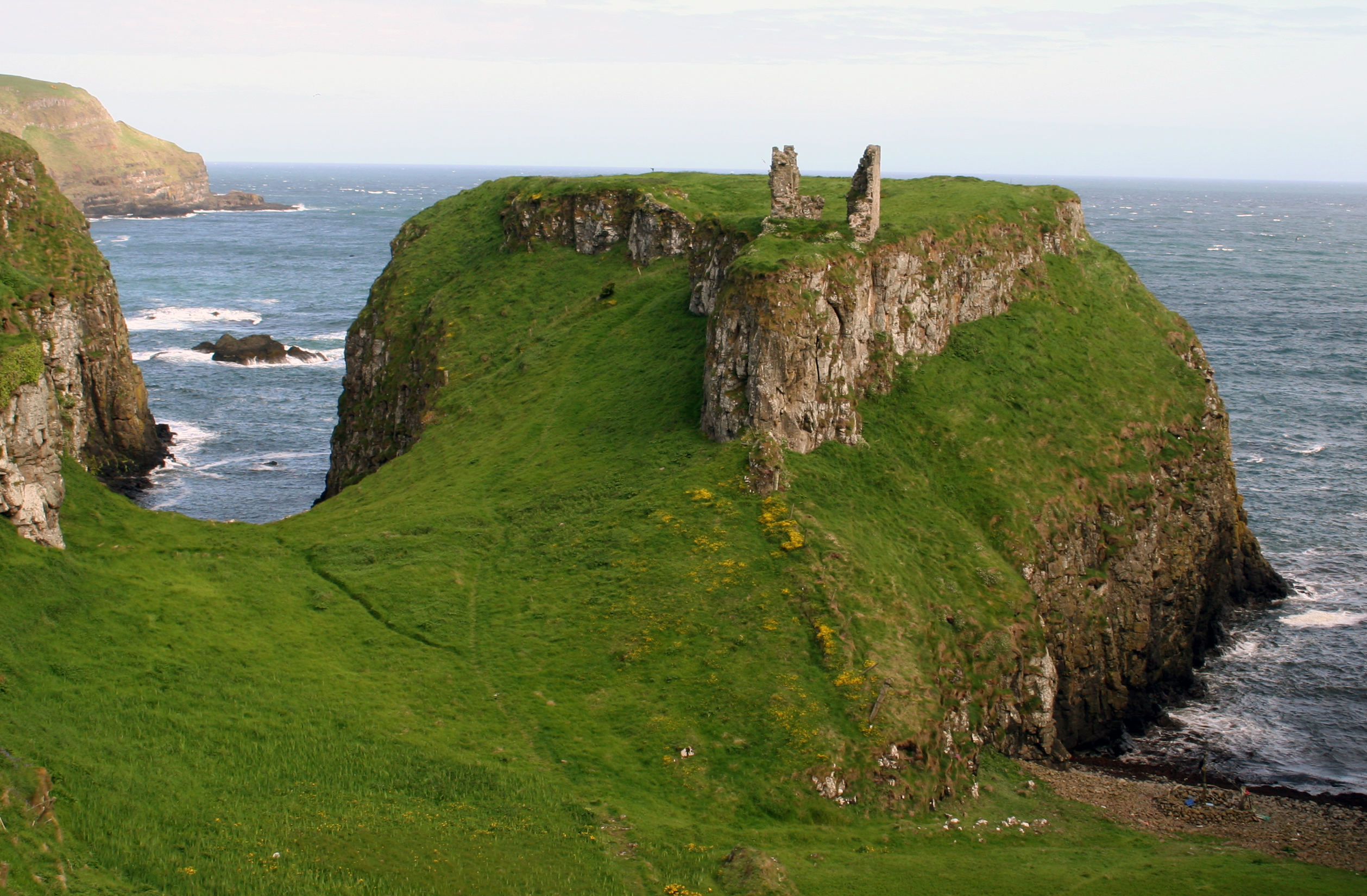
- Dunseverick Castle

- Dunseverick (alias Feigh) shown within Northern Ireland Dunseverick (alias Feigh) (the United Kingdom)
- Coordinates: 55°14′10″N 6°27′22″W
- Sovereign state: United Kingdom
- Country: Northern Ireland
- County: Antrim
- Barony: Cary
- Civil parish: Billy
- First recorded: Before 1609
- Settlements: Dunseverick

Area
  - Total: 256.0 acres (103.60 ha)

Dunseverick (from Irish Dún Sobhairce 'Sobhairce's fort') is a hamlet near the Giant's Causeway in County Antrim, Northern Ireland. The name is also the alias for the townland of Feigh. It is most notable for Dunseverick Castle. There is also a waterfall close to the coast.

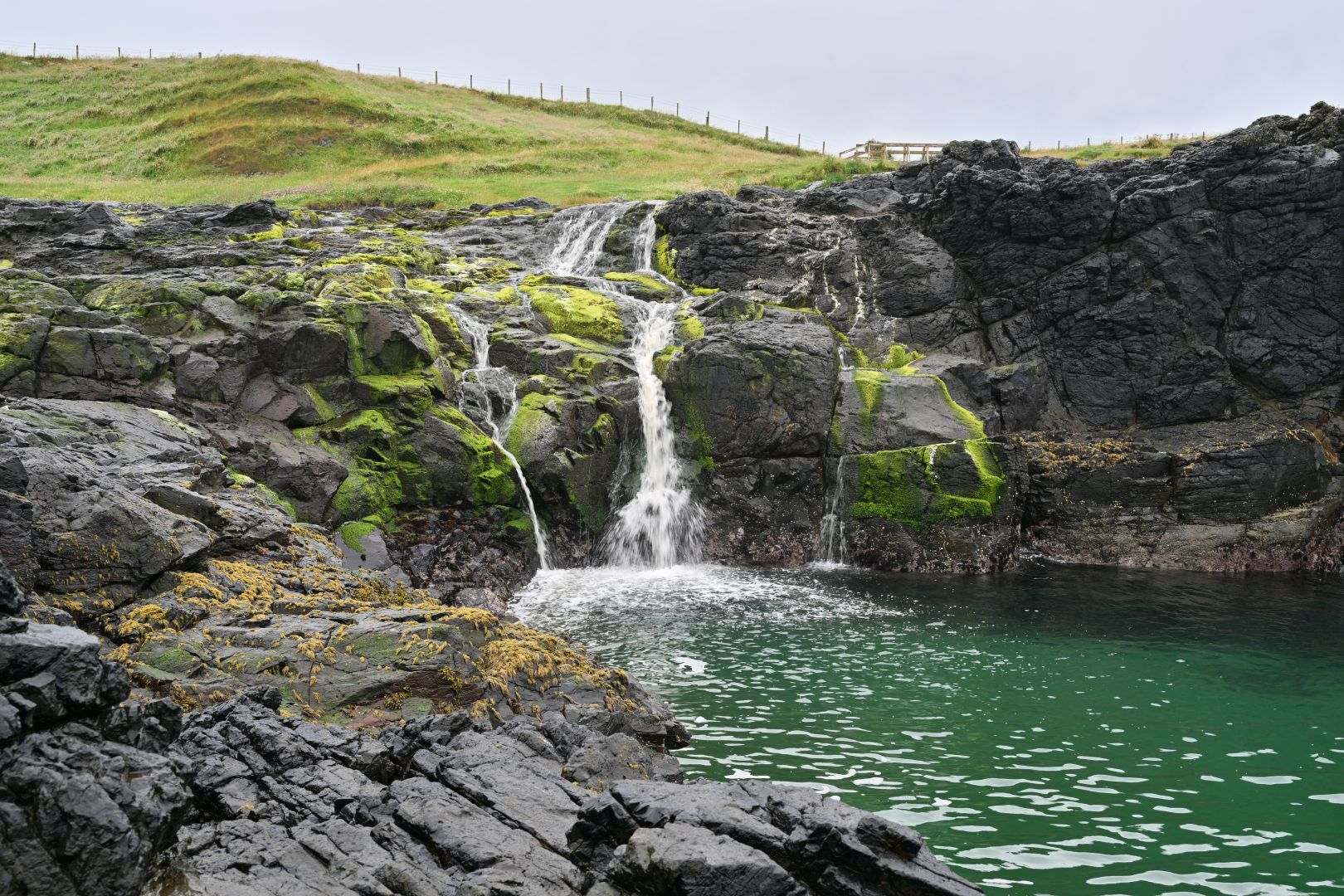
Dunseverick Falls

One of the five great highways, or slighe of ancient Ireland, Slige Midluachra, had its terminal point at Dunseverick, running from here to Emain Macha and further to royal Tara and the fording point on the Liffey at what is now Dublin.

The hamlet of Dunseverick itself lies in the adjacent townland of Currysheskin.
