= Íriel Fáid =

Legendary High King of Ireland

- High King of Ireland
- Reign: c. 1670–1640 BC
- Coronation: Hill of Tara
- Predecessor: Érimón
- Successor: Ethriel
- Born: unknown Ireland
- Died: c. 1640 BC; Ireland
- House: Milesian
- Father: Éber Finn
- Mother: unknown
- Religion: Celtic polytheism

Irial Fáid ("the prophet"), the youngest son of Érimón by his wife Tea, according to medieval Irish legends and historical traditions, became High King of Ireland after killing Ér, Orba, Ferón and Fergna, sons of Éber Finn, in the Battle of Cul Martha, in revenge for their killing of his brothers Luigne and Laigne. He cleared twelve plains, dug seven royal forts, and fought four battles against the Fomorians. Having ruled for ten years, he died at Mag Muaide, and was succeeded by his son Ethriel. The Lebor Gabála Érenn places his death during the reign of Tautanes in Assyria (1191–1182 BC according to Jerome's Chronicon). Geoffrey Keating dates his reign from 1269 to 1259 BC, the Annals of the Four Masters from 1681 to 1671 BC.

Royal titles
Preceded by Ér, Orba, Ferón and Fergna	High King of Ireland; LGE d. before 1182 BC; FFE 1269–1259 BC; AFM 1681–1671 BC	Succeeded by Ethriel
