= Slige Midluachra =

Ancient route in Ireland

Slige Midluachra is the old northern road sometimes known High Kings Road that ran in ancient times from Tara, Ireland to Dunseverick on the north coast of Northern Ireland.

It was one of the legendary Five Roads of Tara, site of the ancient Seat of Ireland's High Kings. The legendary Five Roads of Tara, described in the Dindshenchas of Slige Dala, are named Slige Dala, Slige Assail, Slige Midluachra, Slige Cualann, and Slige Mór.

General road routes are described in the Dindshenchas, with mention of a few reference locations along each road. Three other ancient roads, referred to as "cow" roads, were found in Lady Gregory's Irish Myths and Legends. Lady Gregory relates the legend of how Manannan's three cows (one white, one red, and one black) created the first three roads in Ireland.

== Route ==
Slige Midluachra originated at Tara, crossing the Boyne at Slane, passing through Moyry Pass and then around the base of Slieve Fuaid (near modern Newtownhamilton) to Emain Macha, and then on to Dunseverick on the north coast of Antrim.

== Sources ==
- An Analysis of Pre-Christian Ireland Using Mythology and A GIS
- Stokes, Whitley, ed. (1913), "The Metrical Dinnshenchas", Royal Irish Academy Todd Lecture Series, vol. X, pp. 276–285 , e-text at CELT: text and translation
