= Conmáel =

Legendary High King of Ireland

- High King of Ireland
- Reign: c. 1620–1600 BC
- Coronation: Hill of Tara
- Predecessor: Ethriel
- Successor: Tigernmas
- Born: unknown Ireland
- Died: c. 1600 BC; Ireland
- House: Milesian
- Father: Éber Finn
- Mother: unknown
- Religion: Celtic polytheism

Conmáel, son of Éber Finn, according to medieval Irish legend and historical traditions, became High King of Ireland when he killed Ethriel, son of Íriel Fáid, in the Battle of Rairiu. He was the first Milesian High King to have been born in Ireland, and the first to have been based in Munster. He fought twenty-five battles against the descendants of Érimón, and ruled for thirty years, until he was killed by Tigernmas in the Battle of Óenach Macha. The Eóganachta are said to be his descendants. The Lebor Gabála Érenn synchronises his reign with the deaths of Samson in ancient Israel, and Fleuthius, king of Assyria. Geoffrey Keating dates his reign from 1239–1209 BC, the Annals of the Four Masters from 1651 to 1621 BC.

== Notes ==
Royal titles
| Preceded by Ethriel | High King of Ireland; FFE 1239–1209 BC; AFM 1651–1621 BC | Succeeded by Tigernmas |
