= The Troubles in Lurgan =

Incidents in Lurgan, Northern Ireland during the Troubles

The Troubles in Lurgan recounts incidents during the Troubles in Lurgan, County Armagh, Northern Ireland.

== 1971 ==
- 9 November 1971 - Paul Genge (18), a British Army soldier, shot by the Irish Republican Army in a drive-by shooting on Tandragee Road.
- 24 November 1971 - Colin Davies (38), a British Army soldier, killed whilst attempting to defuse an IRA bomb on William Street.

== 1972 ==
- 16 March 1972 - Carmel Knox (20), a Catholic civilian, killed in a loyalist bomb attack on public toilets on Market Street.
- 18 June 1972 – Arthur McMillan (37), Ian Mutch (31), Colin Leslie (26), all British Army soldiers, killed in a booby trap bomb in a derelict house by Provisional Irish Republican Army, Bleary, near Lurgan
- 8 November 1972 - Irwin Long (40), a member of the Ulster Defence Regiment, shot dead by the Provisional Irish Republican Army as he drove along Lake Street.
- 15 December 1972 - George Chambers (44), a member of the Royal Ulster Constabulary, shot dead by the Official Irish Republican Army at Kilwilke Gardens.

== 1973 ==
- 3 October 1973 - Ivan Vennard (32), Protestant civilian, former member of the Ulster Defence Regiment, shot dead by the Provisional IRA while he delivered mail on the Kilwilke Estate.
- 1 December 1973 - Robert Megaw (29), RUC member, shot by IRA sniper on Edward Street.

== 1974 ==
- 18 June 1974 - John Forsythe (30), a member of the Royal Ulster Constabulary, killed by a booby-trap bomb by the Provisional IRA in an entry off Market Street.

== 1975 ==
- 19 February 1975 - James Breen (45), a Catholic civilian, shot dead by loyalists outside his home on North Circular Road.
- 27 April 1975 – Joseph Toman (45), John Feeney (45), and Brendan O'Hara (40) all Catholics, shot during a gun attack on social club, Bleary, near Lurgan by the Protestant Action Force
- 7 July 1975 - Andrew Johnston (26), a Royal Ulster Constabulary member, killed by an IRA bomb at Carrick Primary School.
- 27 July 1975 - Billy Hanna (46), founder and first commander of the Ulster Volunteer Force's Mid-Ulster Brigade, is shot dead outside his home in the Mourneview estate by members of his own organisation.
- 29 October 1975 - James Griffin (20), a Catholic civilian, shot dead by the UVF in his home on Hill Street. His murder was the subject of the 2009 film, Five Minutes of Heaven.

== 1977 ==
- 24 February 1977 - Harold Cobb, a member of the Royal Ulster Constabulary, shot dead by the IRA at Church Place.

== 1981 ==
- 17 November 1981 - Peadar Fagan (20), a Catholic civilian, killed by the Ulster Volunteer Force in a drive-by shooting on Levin Road.

== 1982 ==
- 27 October 1982 – Seán Quinn (37), a Catholic, Alan McCloy (34) and Paul Hamilton (26), both Protestants, all members of the Royal Ulster Constabulary (RUC), were killed in a Provisional Irish Republican Army land mine attack on their armoured patrol car at Oxford Island, near Lurgan.
- 11 November 1982 - Eugene Toman (21), Sean Burns (21) and Gervase McKerr (31), all Catholic members of the Irish Republican Army, shot dead by undercover RUC officers at a vehicle checkpoint, Tullgalley East Road, Craigavon. 109 shots were fired at the car they were travelling in, there was no retaliation.
- 24 November 1982 - Michael Tighe (17), a Catholic civilian, shot dead by an undercover RUC unit at Ballynery North Road, Derrymacash, near Lurgan.

== 1983 ==
- 2 April 1983 - Seán McConville (28), a Catholic civilian, beaten to death by a loyalist gang as he walked along Lower North Street.
- 25 November 1983 - Daniel Rouse (51), a Catholic civilian, beaten to death by a loyalist gang as he walked along Old Portadown Road.

== 1984 ==
- 27 January 1984 - Daniel McIntyre (28), a Catholic civilian, shot dead by the Ulster Volunteer Force from a passing car as he walked along Manor Drive.

== 1990 ==
- 7 January 1990 - Martin Byrne (28), a Catholic civilian, is shot dead in his taxi by the Protestant Action Force at Aghacommon, outside Lurgan.
- 7 March 1990 - Sam Marshall (31), a member of Sinn Féin, is assassinated by the UVF shortly after leaving the town's Royal Ulster Constabulary station. Two of his companions escaped unharmed.
- 23 September 1990 - Colin McCullough (22), a member of the Ulster Defence Regiment, is shot dead by the Irish Republican Army at Oxford Island on the outskirts of town.
- 6 October 1990 - Denis Carville (19), a Catholic civilian, is shot dead by the Ulster Volunteer Force's Mid-Ulster Brigade at Oxford Island on the outskirts of town.
- 10 November 1990 – David Murphy (50) and Thomas Taylor (49) both Protestant members of the Royal Ulster Constabulary were shot dead alongside Protestant civilians Norman Kendall (44) and Keith Dowey (30) by the Provisional Irish Republican Army at Castor's Bay outside the town.

== 1992 ==
- 1 April 1992 - Peter McClements (43), a Protestant civilian, shot dead by the UVF as an alleged informer outside his home on Lower Toberhewney Lane.

== 1993 ==
- 24 June 1993 - John Lyness (57), a Protestant civilian, ex-member of Ulster Defence Regiment, shot dead by the Provisional Irish Republican Army near his home at Lime Grove.
- 28 October 1993 – Gerard Cairns (22) and Rory Cairns (18) both Catholics, shot at their home by the Ulster Volunteer Force's Mid-Ulster Brigade, the Slopes, Bleary, near Lurgan.

== 1994 ==
- 13 May 1994 - Fred Anthony (38), a Protestant civilian employed by the RUC, killed by the IRA using a booby-trap bomb under his car on Hill Street.
- 11 August 1994 - Martin L'Estrange (36), a Catholic civilian, shot dead by the Ulster Defence Association outside his workplace on William Street.

== 1996 ==
- 9 July 1996 - Michael McGoldrick (31), a Catholic civilian, found in his cab in a remote lane at Aghagallon, near Lurgan, a day after having picked up a fare in the town. He had been shot five times in the head. Both the UVF and the UDA released statements emphatically denying involvement in McGoldrick's killing. The killing was believed to have been orchestrated by Portadown loyalist Billy Wright at the height of that summer's Drumcree conflict. Wright was subsequently expelled from the Ulster Volunteer Force and ordered to leave Northern Ireland on pain of death; he later established the Loyalist Volunteer Force.

== 1997 ==
- 16 June 1997 – John Graham (34) and David Johnston (30), both Protestant members of the Royal Ulster Constabulary, were shot dead by the Provisional Irish Republican Army, while on foot patrol at Church Walk, Lurgan. The two officers were shot in the head from close range from behind and were the first to be killed by the IRA since the ending of its ceasefire on 9 February 1996. In response the British Government called off further contact with Sinn Féin.

== 1998 ==
- 7 July 1998 - The home of Catholic man Seán Dowds (63) and his English Protestant wife Joan Dowds (54) was attacked with petrol bombs after a group of loyalists terrorised the Collingwood housing estate in Lurgan. Both of them survived, however, Mr Dowds was rushed to hospital after suffering severe chest pains due to a history of heart attacks. The couple and residents of the Collingwood estate held the Orange Order responsible.
