= Drumbeg =

Drumbeg could refer to:

- Drumbeg, County Down, Northern Ireland
- Drumbeg, Sutherland, Highland, Scotland
- Drumbeg, County Antrim, Northern Ireland, see Belfast Upper#List of civil parishes
- Drumbeg, County Donegal, Republic of Ireland, see Inver#Townlands
- Drumbeg Provincial Park, British Columbia, Canada
- 1991 Drumbeg killings, County Armagh, Northern Ireland
