= Sandwell Provincial Park =

Provincial park in British Columbia, Canada

- IUCN category II (national park)
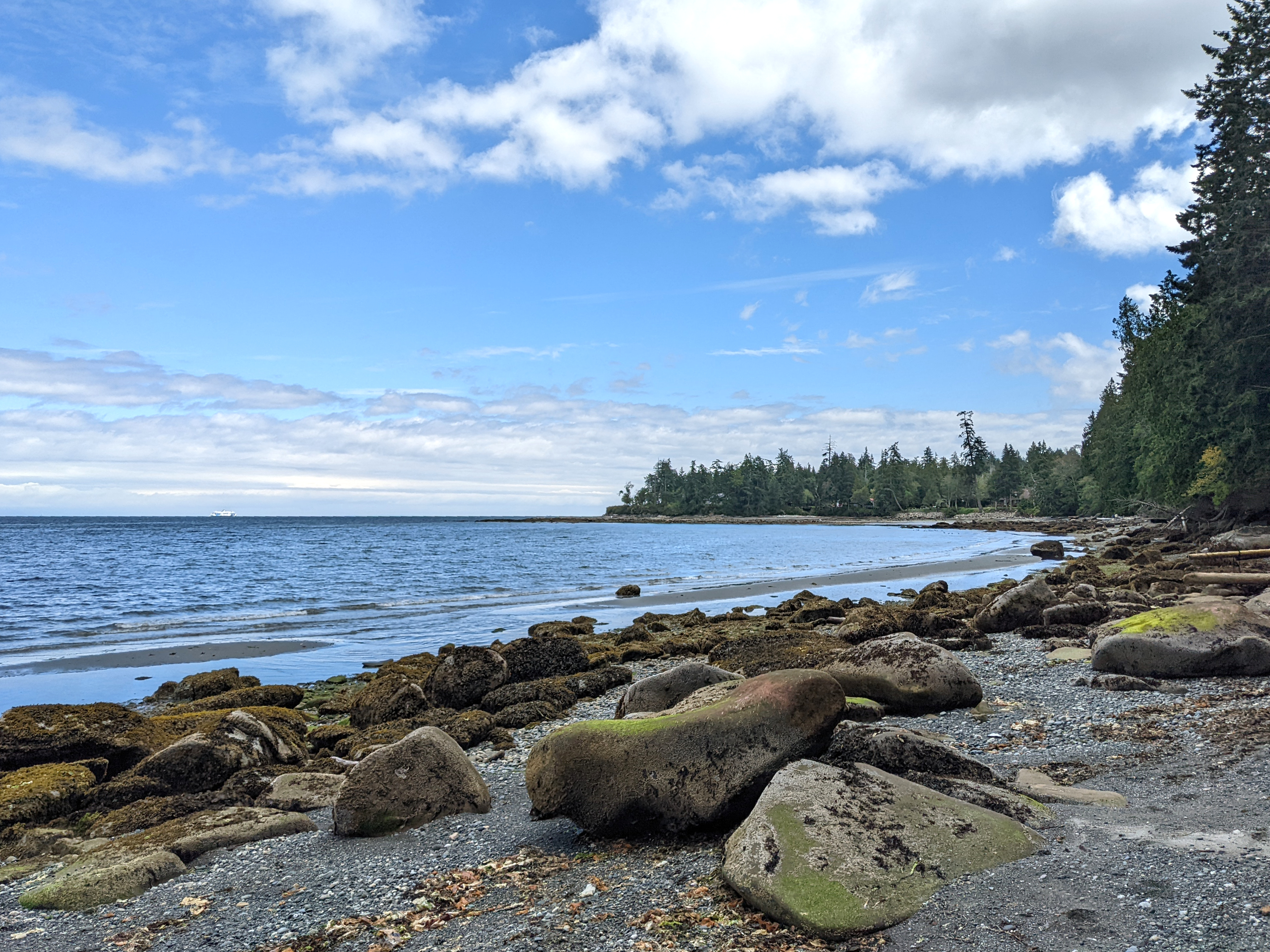
- Sandwell Provincial Park

- Location within Vancouver Island Location within British Columbia
- Interactive map of Sandwell Provincial Park
- Location: British Columbia, Canada
- Nearest city: Nanaimo
- Coordinates: 49°11′05″N 123°49′01″W
- Area: 17 ha (42 acres)
- Established: June 16, 1988
- Governing body: BC Parks

Sandwell Provincial Park is a provincial park in British Columbia, Canada. It is a small oceanfront site on Lock Bay, on the northeast shore of Gabriola Island. Hiking, swimming and beach-walking are popular activities here, though it is only accessible at low tide and park facilities are limited. There are also petroglyphs carved into the sandstone boulders on Lock Bay's foreshore.

Gabriola Island, on which the park is located, is in the Southern Gulf Islands of British Columbia. Nearby communities include Nanaimo and Yellow Point. Access to the park is via North Road, Barrett Road and left onto Strand Road, continuing to the park. Access to Gabriola Island is by a 20-minute ferry trip from Nanaimo on Vancouver Island to Descanso Bay on Gabriola Island.

Other parks on Gabriola Island are the nearby Drumbeg Provincial Park and Gabriola Sands Provincial Park.
