= Gabriola Island =

- Island
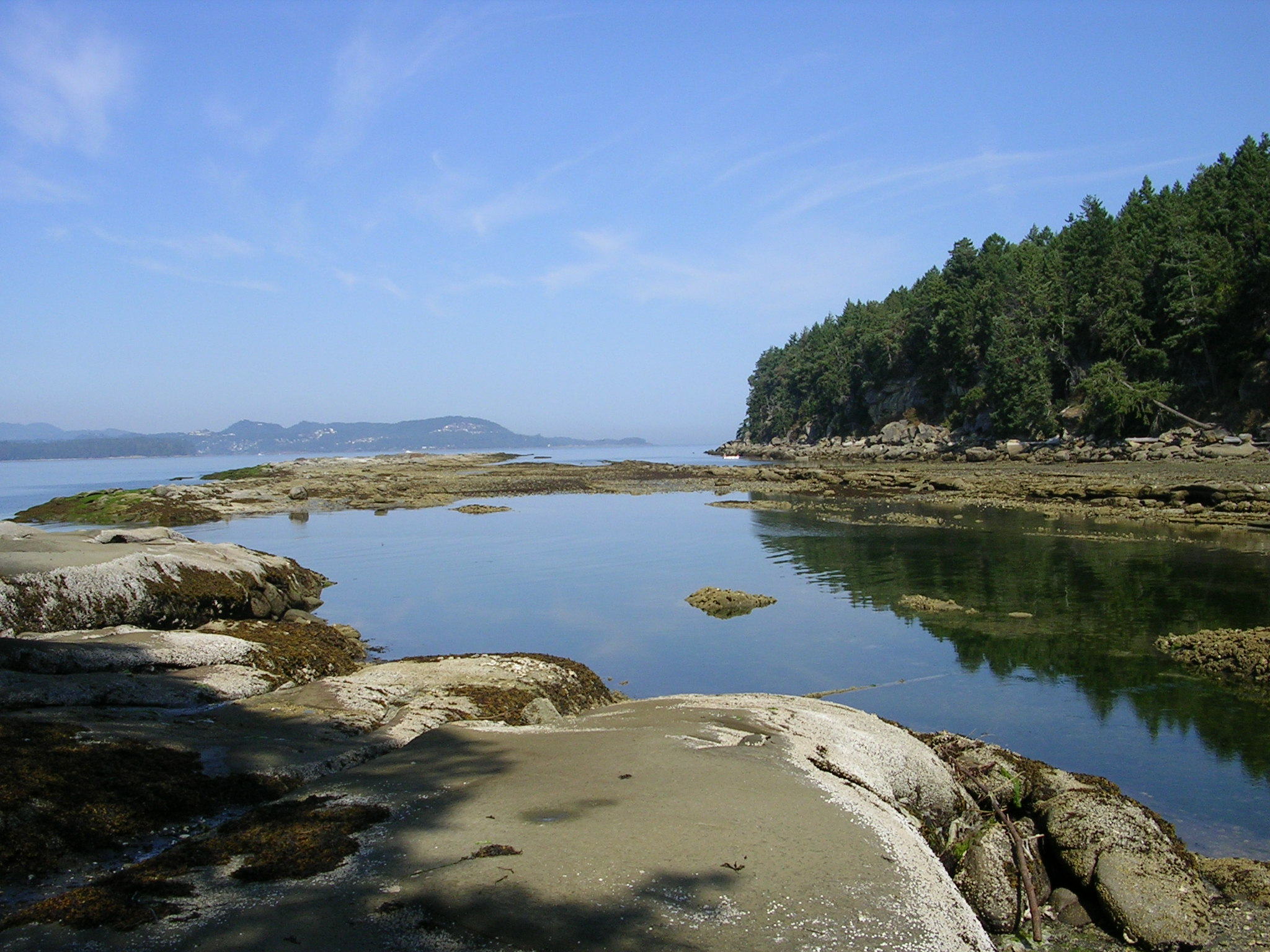
- Beach at Descanso Bay

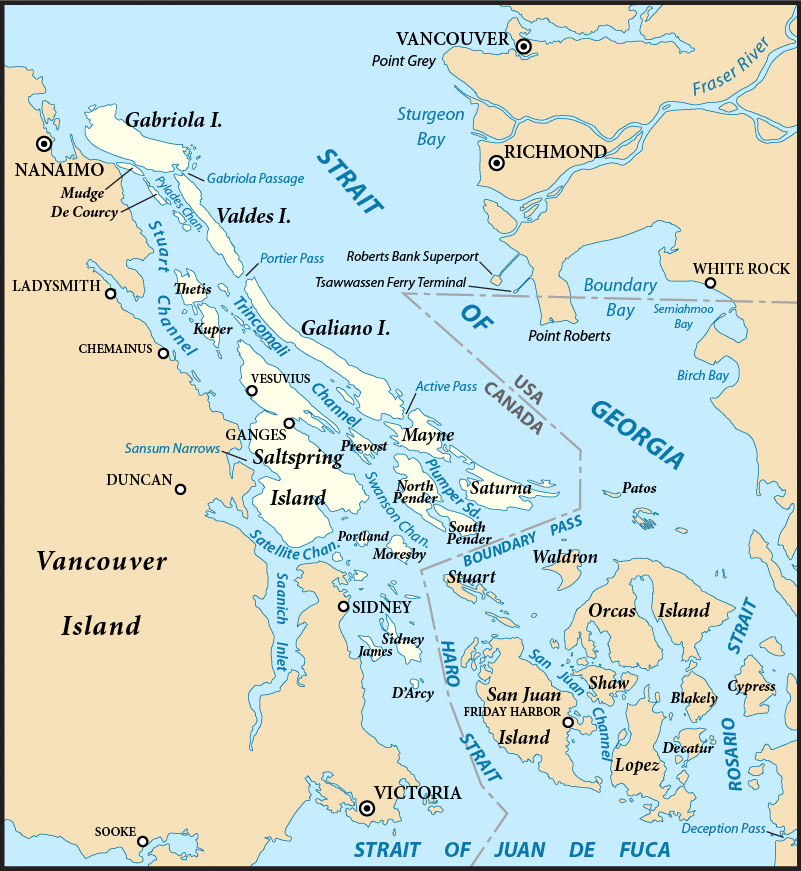
- Gabriola in the southern Gulf Islands

- Location of Gabriola, near Vancouver Island Gabriola Island (British Columbia)
- Coordinates: 49°9′0″N 123°43′58.8″W
- Country: Canada
- Province: British Columbia
- Regional district: Nanaimo

Area
  - Total: 58.12 km^{2} (22.44 sq mi)

Population (2021)
  - Total: 4,500
  - Density: 77.4/km^{2} (200/sq mi)
- Time zone: UTC−8 (Pacific Time Zone)
  - Summer (DST): UTC−7 (Pacific Daylight Time)
- Postal code span: V0R
- Area code: Area code 250

Gabriola Island is one of the Gulf Islands in the Strait of Georgia in British Columbia (BC), Canada. It is about 5 kilometres (3.1 mi) east of Nanaimo on Vancouver Island, to which it is linked by a 20-minute ferry service. It has a land area of about 57.6 square kilometres (22.2 sq mi) and a resident population of 4,500.

Gabriola has public beaches and forests, shopping centres, restaurants, a library, an elementary school and a museum. It is known as the Isle of the Arts due to its high percentage of working artists, and its many cultural events include annual festivals related to art, poetry, gardens, music, boating and fishing. The Gabriola Arts Council produces three large annual events: the Isle of the Arts Festival (April), Cultivate Arts Festival (Summer) and Thanksgiving Studio Tour (October).

== History ==
=== Pre-contact ===
Gabriola is part of the traditional territory of the Snunéymux (of whose name the nearby city of Nanaimo was given an anglicized form). The earliest archeological record on Gabriola is a cave burial dated to about 1500 BC.

The pre-contact population of Gabriola is difficult to estimate, but in mid-Marpole times—between about AD 1 and 1000—several thousand people lived in the village at Senewélets or more commonly known as, False Narrows, the site of today's El Verano Drive. Archaeologists have found that infant mortality at that time was surprisingly low and that the population was well adapted to its environment. Other smaller villages on Gabriola were scattered around the coast. After contact, and perhaps as early as AD 1500, the population of the Snunéymux declined drastically from smallpox and other diseases brought to North America by Europeans. Overall, there are over 200 archaeological sites on Gabriola and the isles near it.

The island is famous for its petroglyphs, which, while commonly believed to be thousands of years old, are almost impossible to date. Because they are carved in relatively soft sandstone, they are eroding rapidly.

=== Post-contact ===
The first European visit to Gabriola was by the Spanish schooner Santa Saturnina under José María Narváez in 1791. Narváez is said to have given the name Punta de Gaviola to the southeastern end of the island. It may also have been Juan Francisco de la Bodega y Quadra, rather than Narváez, who bestowed the name. Over time, "Gaviola" may have been corrupted into "Gabriola" and applied to the whole island. Gaviola is sometimes said to be a misspelling of gaviota ("seagull"), but it may refer to the Spanish surname Gaviola.

In 1792, the island was again visited by a Spanish expedition, under Galiano and Valdés. Galiano and Valdés stayed at Pilot Bay for several days, to repair their vessels and explore the vicinity of what is now Nanaimo. They called the anchorage Cala del Descanso ("Cove of Rest"). Galiano stayed at the island for four days and while there, encountered several Indigenous people and engaged in limited trading. Galiano also found an abandoned First Nations village. This site was later wrongly identified as the present Descanso Bay by British cartographers. The British expedition of George Vancouver may also have visited the island very briefly in 1792. While the Spanish explored and charted the Strait of Georgia, they left no permanent settlements. In 1827, fur traders of the Hudson's Bay Company established a post at Fort Langley on the Fraser River, but no Europeans settled in the Nanaimo area until the discovery of coal there in 1852. From the mid-1850s on, coal miners and ex-gold miners began to move to Gabriola, where they started farms to supply the growing population of Nanaimo.

By 1874, 17 settlers were working the land on Gabriola, and two-thirds of those had First Nations wives and young families. Portuguese settler John Silva, for whom Silva Bay was named, married "Louise," the daughter of a Cowichan chief, in 1873. Three of their sons volunteered to fight in the First World War; one was killed, another wounded. The name of Frank Silva, missing in action on Vimy Ridge in 1917, is inscribed on the Vimy Memorial in France.

In 1891, the population of the Gabriola Island subdistrict was of 125. In the early 20th century, the population of Gabriola grew slowly. By the 1950s, fewer than 400 people lived full-time on the island. Electricity came to Gabriola in 1955, but even then the population grew only about one percent a year until the 1970s. In roughly the next 10 years, the population tripled, in part due to hippie immigration from the United States. By the mid-1980s, the population was 2,000, half the current figure.

In summer, the island's population greatly increases. Even in the first half of the 20th century, families came from Nanaimo or Vancouver to summer there, spending weeks or months living a simpler, rural life on the island. In the 21st century, about 2,000 summer visitors come to Gabriola each year for the sun, music, art, and relaxed pace, and they raise the population temporarily to about 6,000.

Apart from farming, Gabriola experienced industrial development in the 20th century. A brickyard produced 80,000 high-quality bricks a day in the early part of the century, and they were sent principally to Victoria and Vancouver. The brickyard ceased functioning in the 1950s. In the 1890s and early twentieth century, sandstone blocks were cut from a quarry near Descanso Bay and shipped for architectural use in public buildings in Vancouver and Victoria. In the early- to mid-1930s, millstones were cut from the sandstone and sent to towns along the west coast and as far away as Finland for use in the pulp and paper industry. A small diatomaceous earth industry also flourished in the 1930s. After World War II, the shipyard at Silva Bay became the major employer on the island until the 1970s.

== Geography ==
Gabriola, part of the Regional District of Nanaimo, is the most northerly of the Southern Gulf Islands in the Strait of Georgia between mainland BC to the east and Vancouver Island to the west. The Gulf Islands are an archipelago consisting of hundreds of islands of various sizes stretching from the San Juan Islands in the United States to the Northern Gulf Islands, north of Gabriola. The biggest of the Southern Gulf Islands are Gabriola Island, Galiano Island, Penelakut Island, North and South Pender Island, Saltspring Island, Saturna Island, Thetis Island, and Valdes Island.

The Southern Gulf Islands consist mainly of former seabed sediments crumpled and gradually thrust upward by tectonic plate movement approximately 55 to 42 million years ago. Subsequent periods of glaciation scraped away topsoil and some of the bedrock. During the peak of the Fraser Glaciation, 30,000 to 11,000 years ago, Gabriola was covered with ice up to 2 kilometres (1.2 mi) thick. Though melting glaciers left deposits of sand, gravel, and boulders, the main rocks exposed on Gabriola's surface are sandstone and shale. Differential erosion of relatively soft shales and relatively hard sandstones helped create cliffs, points, and bays along Gabriola's shoreline.

Gabriola is about 14 kilometres (9 mi) long by 4.2 kilometres (2.6 mi) wide on average with a land area of 57.6 square kilometres (22.2 sq mi). The topography varies from flat sandy beaches at sea level to forested hills rising to 160 metres (525 ft) on Stoney Ridge in the centre of the island.

Gabriola lies about 5 kilometres (3.1 mi) east of Nanaimo, the second largest city on Vancouver Island, to which it is linked by BC Ferries. The ferry, which takes 20 minutes for the crossing, runs almost hourly from 6:15 a.m, starting at the Gabriola side, to about 11:00 p.m., from Nanaimo, daily. Residents of Gabriola who work or attend high school in Nanaimo use the ferry to commute. Gabriola may also be reached by float plane or small boat.

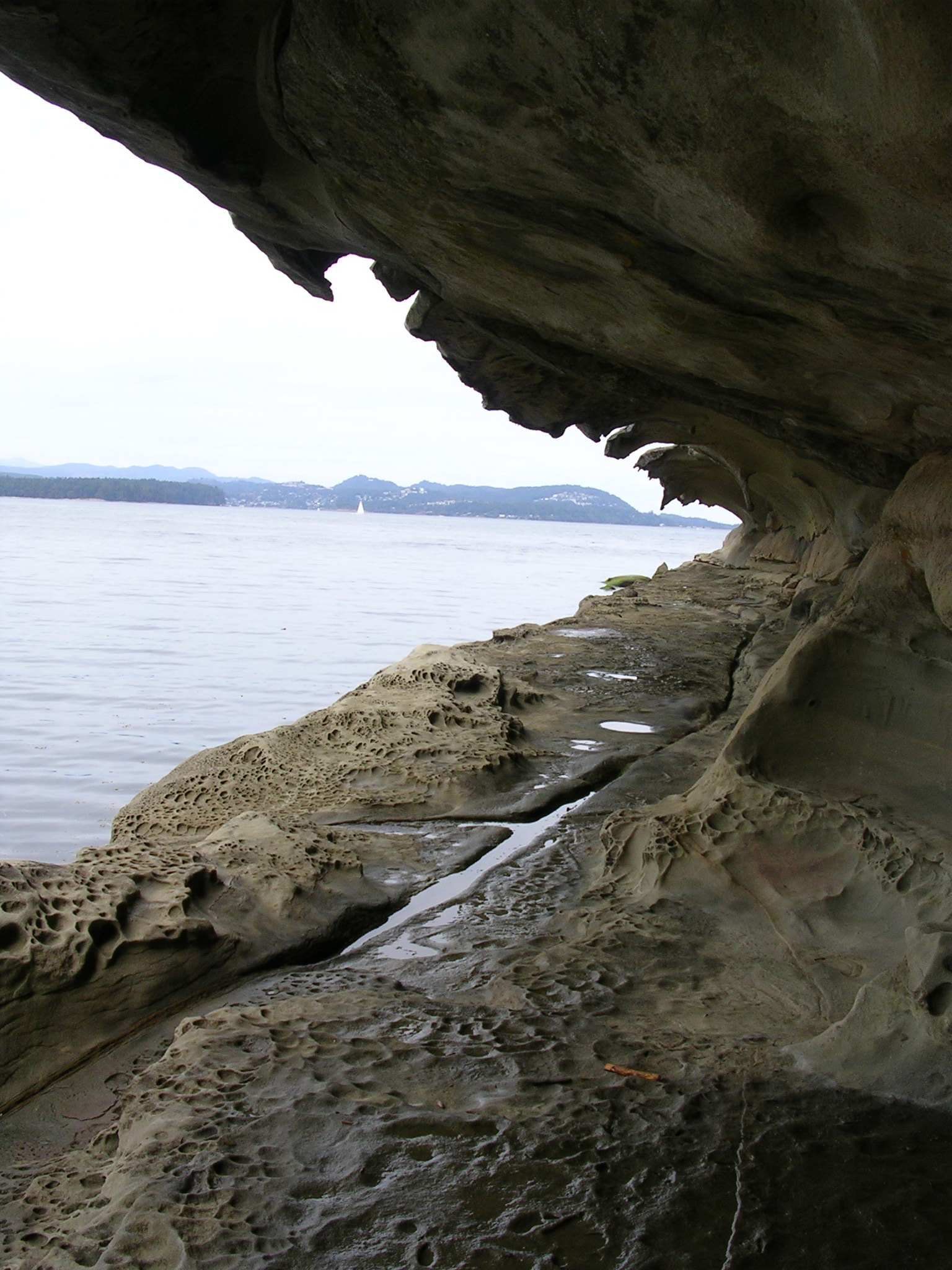
Malaspina Galleries

Islands and islets near Gabriola include Snake Island and Entrance Island to the north, the Flat Top Islands, Breakwater Island, and Valdes Island to the east, and Mudge Island, Link Island, and DeCourcy Island to the south. The North Road-South Road loop of 30 kilometres (18.6 mi) is the main island highway. It passes near most parts of the island, including the ferry terminal at Descanso Bay.

The island has three provincial parks—Gabriola Sands Provincial Park on the northwest shore, Sandwell Provincial Park on the northeast shore, and Drumbeg Provincial Park on the east shore—as well as Descanso Bay Regional Park and an adjacent community park near the ferry terminal. Large coastal sandstone formations known as the Malaspina Galleries are preserved in this community park. The formations were named after the 18th-century Spanish explorer Alejandro Malaspina.

== Demographics ==
Gabriola's population increased from 3,522 in 2001 to 4,500 in 2021, an overall increase of 27.8%. Most growth occurred between 2001 and 2006 and between 2016 and 2021; the population declined slightly between 2006 and 2016. This growth rate nearly matched the rate for BC as a whole, which grew at a rate of 28% percent. The population density was 77.565 people/km^{2} (200.89 people/mi^{2}) in 2021.

The total number of private dwellings on Gabriola was 3,062 in 2021, of which 2,375 were occupied by the usual residents. The median age of the population was 63.2 years compared to the BC median of 42.8. Of the total population, 2,130 were male and 2,370 were female.

== Climate ==
Under the Köppen climate classification, the island has a cool summer Mediterranean climate due to its dry summers. Other climate classification systems, such as Trewartha, place it firmly in the Oceanic zone (Do). Cool and moist, the island averages 138 rainy days per year and seven days with snowfall greater than 0.2 centimetres (0.08 in). Days with high temperatures of 30 °C (86 °F) or higher are rare, averaging less than one per year. Days with temperatures below 0 °C (32 °F) occur about 25 times per year. Winters are cool and wet with the average temperature in January being 3.7 °C (39 °F) and an average precipitation of 130 millimetres (5 in). Due to its mild winters, the average annual snowfall is low at 40 centimetres (16 in) during the season. Summers, on the other hand are dry and mild with a July average of 16.9 °C (62 °F) with only 26 millimetres (1 in) of precipitation.

Climate data for Gabriola Island
| Month | Jan | Feb | Mar | Apr | May | Jun | Jul | Aug | Sep | Oct | Nov | Dec | Year |
|---|---|---|---|---|---|---|---|---|---|---|---|---|---|
| Record high °C (°F) | 14.5 (58.1) | 15.0 (59.0) | 20.5 (68.9) | 25.0 (77.0) | 31.0 (87.8) | 30.0 (86.0) | 32.0 (89.6) | 31.0 (87.8) | 30.0 (86.0) | 24.0 (75.2) | 18.0 (64.4) | 13.5 (56.3) | 32.0 (89.6) |
| Mean daily maximum °C (°F) | 6.6 (43.9) | 7.7 (45.9) | 10.0 (50.0) | 13.0 (55.4) | 16.6 (61.9) | 19.3 (66.7) | 22.2 (72.0) | 22.3 (72.1) | 19.2 (66.6) | 13.4 (56.1) | 8.8 (47.8) | 6.0 (42.8) | 13.8 (56.8) |
| Daily mean °C (°F) | 3.7 (38.7) | 4.3 (39.7) | 6.1 (43.0) | 8.5 (47.3) | 11.7 (53.1) | 14.4 (57.9) | 16.9 (62.4) | 16.8 (62.2) | 13.8 (56.8) | 9.3 (48.7) | 5.6 (42.1) | 3.3 (37.9) | 9.5 (49.1) |
| Mean daily minimum °C (°F) | 0.8 (33.4) | 0.8 (33.4) | 2.2 (36.0) | 4.0 (39.2) | 6.6 (43.9) | 9.6 (49.3) | 11.4 (52.5) | 11.2 (52.2) | 8.4 (47.1) | 5.1 (41.2) | 2.4 (36.3) | 0.6 (33.1) | 5.3 (41.5) |
| Record low °C (°F) | −16.0 (3.2) | −12.0 (10.4) | −6.0 (21.2) | −4.0 (24.8) | −2.0 (28.4) | 2.0 (35.6) | 4.0 (39.2) | 4.5 (40.1) | 0.0 (32.0) | −4.5 (23.9) | −14.0 (6.8) | −15.0 (5.0) | −16.0 (3.2) |
| Average precipitation mm (inches) | 129.8 (5.11) | 105.9 (4.17) | 86.9 (3.42) | 57.0 (2.24) | 44.9 (1.77) | 40.9 (1.61) | 26.0 (1.02) | 28.2 (1.11) | 38.5 (1.52) | 81.3 (3.20) | 146.9 (5.78) | 137.8 (5.43) | 924.0 (36.38) |
| Average rainfall mm (inches) | 116.1 (4.57) | 96.8 (3.81) | 85.1 (3.35) | 57.0 (2.24) | 44.9 (1.77) | 40.9 (1.61) | 26.0 (1.02) | 28.2 (1.11) | 38.5 (1.52) | 80.9 (3.19) | 143.0 (5.63) | 126.9 (5.00) | 884.3 (34.81) |
| Average snowfall cm (inches) | 13.7 (5.4) | 9.1 (3.6) | 1.8 (0.7) | 0 (0) | 0 (0) | 0 (0) | 0 (0) | 0 (0) | 0 (0) | 0.3 (0.1) | 3.9 (1.5) | 10.9 (4.3) | 39.7 (15.6) |
| Average precipitation days (≥ 0.2 mm) | 16.5 | 14.1 | 14.4 | 12.5 | 10.7 | 9.2 | 5.9 | 5.7 | 7.3 | 12.2 | 17.2 | 16.4 | 142.0 |
| Average rainy days (≥ 0.2 mm) | 15.0 | 13.3 | 14.3 | 12.5 | 10.7 | 9.2 | 5.9 | 5.7 | 7.3 | 12.1 | 16.7 | 15.2 | 137.9 |
| Average snowy days (≥ 0.2 cm) | 2.3 | 1.3 | 0.37 | 0 | 0 | 0 | 0 | 0 | 0 | 0.07 | 0.70 | 1.9 | 6.7 |
Source: Environment Canada

== Community ==
Island festivals include the annual Isle of the Arts Festival in April, Cultivate Festival in July, and the Thanksgiving Studio Tour, all three events produced by the Gabriola Arts Council. The Concert on the Green and the Annual Salmon Barbecue occur in August. From May to October, the great Saturday Market at the Agricultural Hall features local produce and baked goods from the island, as well as crafts and high-quality artwork. [https://campmiriam.org/ Habonim Dror Camp Miriam, a Jewish summer camp, operates on the island from the end of June through the end of August.

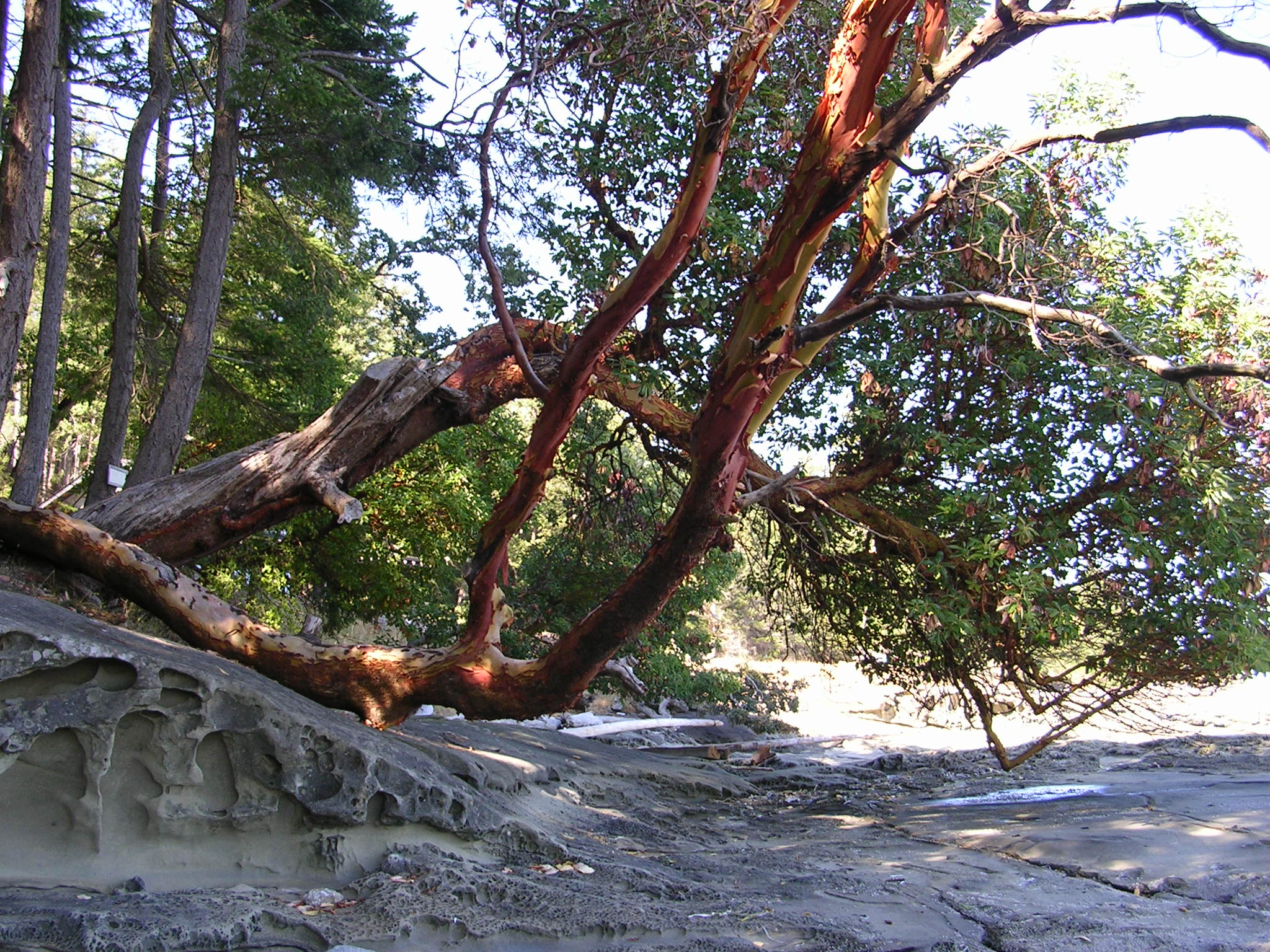
Arbutus tree and sandstone beach

Folklife Village, on North Road a few minutes beyond the ferry terminal, is the island's main shopping centre. It was bought and transferred to Gabriola after its role as the Folklife Pavilion, a tribute to Canada's native and settler cultures, in Expo 86 in Vancouver. Other shopping areas can be found at Twin Beaches Mall on the north end of the island and Silva Bay on the south end. The island has a strong connection to the city of Nanaimo. Some islanders refer to Gabriola as Gabe, Nanaimo as Town, Vancouver Island as The Big Island, and Vancouver as The Mainland.

Gabriola and surrounding islands have more than 70 known petroglyphs – sandstone carvings, some of which may be as old as 2,000 years or more. A small park at the Gabriola Museum contains reproductions of some of these petroglyphs.

== Flora and fauna ==
Plants which are common to the island include the trees Douglas fir, grand fir, Rocky Mountain juniper, Western hemlock, Western red cedar, arbutus, Garry oak, big leaf maple, red alder, and Pacific dogwood; the shrubs Oregon grape and red-flowering currant; the perennial bulb small camas (common camas); the semi-aquatic or terrestrial herb Western skunk cabbage (swamp lantern); and the evergreen perennial Western sword fern.

Marine species near Gabriola include orcas (killer whales), sea lions, seals, otters, oysters, mussels, clams, basket cockles, moon snails, whelks, wolf eels, Pacific herring, octopuses, and salmon. Deer and raccoons are among the island's more common land animals.

In the winter months Gabriola is visited by many species of waterfowl such as the scoter, bufflehead, Barrow's goldeneye, and harlequin duck. Shorebirds such as the black turnstone and ruddy turnstone frequent the island as do garden birds such as the ruby-crowned kinglet, golden-crowned kinglet, thrushes, warblers, pileated woodpeckers, and flickers. The bald eagle, common raven, European starling, peafowl and feral turkey are common year round. The Nanaimo–Gabriola area is populated by over 250 bird species, some of which are migratory species traversing the Pacific Flyway while others are year-round residents
