= Protestant Action Force =

Cover name for Ulster Volunteer Force

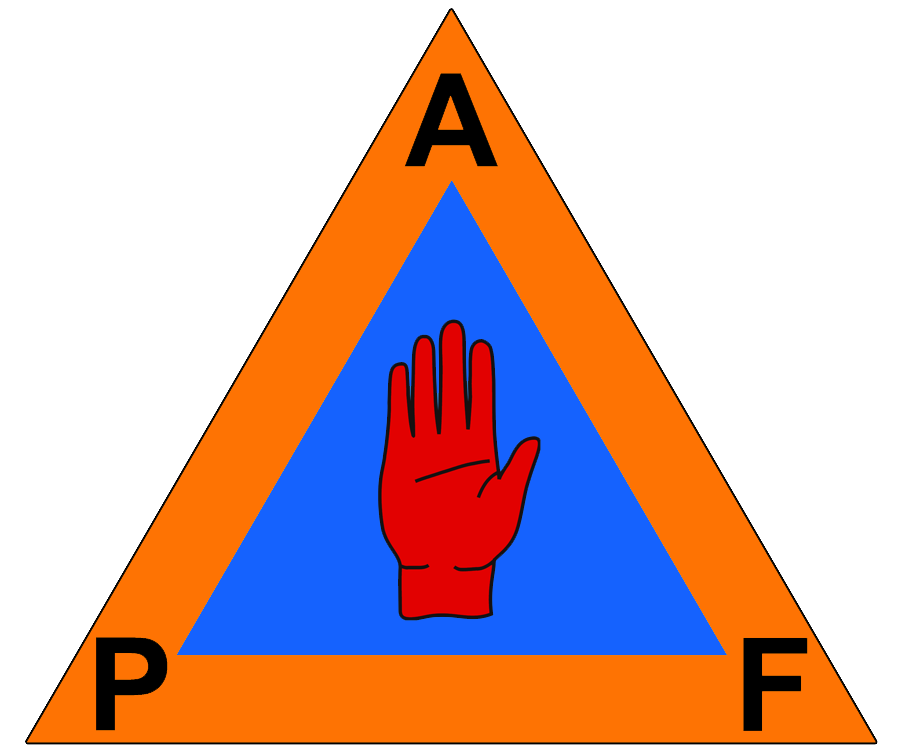
Emblem used to represent the PAF

The Protestant Action Force (PAF) was a cover name used by Ulster loyalist paramilitary group the Ulster Volunteer Force (UVF) when claiming responsibility for a number of attacks during the Troubles in Northern Ireland. Sometimes these actions were carried out with the assistance of members of the security forces. The name "PAF" was first used in 1974 and attacks by individuals claiming to be members of the PAF killed at least 41 Catholic civilians. All of the attacks claimed by the PAF in Armagh and Tyrone counties from 1974 to 1976 have been linked to the Glenanne gang, which was a loose coalition consisting of members of the UVF Mid-Ulster Brigade along with rogue Ulster Defence Regiment (UDR) soldiers and Royal Ulster Constabulary (RUC) police officers. A six-year period of no attacks claimed by the PAF ended in 1982; during the 1980s, the PAF claimed 15 attacks in the Belfast area and two in County Armagh. UDR soldiers were convicted of two attacks in Armagh. The PAF claimed its last attacks in the early 1990s, all of which were in north Armagh and were alleged to involve members of the security forces.

A 2006 report by the Notre Dame Law School argued that the PAF was used by semi-independent groups within the UVF who intended to carry out attacks on their own initiative without the sanction of the paramilitary's senior leadership. The vast majority of the attacks claimed by the PAF occurred in a region between Belfast and Newtownabbey in Armagh and Tyrone known locally as the "murder triangle". On 24 November 1974, shortly after the first attack claimed by the PAF, an interview with three unidentified men was published in the Sunday World. They claimed to represent a loyalist group founded in 1971, that consisted of former British Army members and were engaged in an armed campaign against the Provisional Irish Republican Army (IRA). In the interview, the three men, who claimed their group had killed 28 IRA members or sympathisers in the past two months, replied "no comment" when asked if they belonged to the PAF. Later in the interview, they stated: "You can say we are members of the Mid-Ulster unit of the Protestant Task Force."

In a September 1975 letter, retired Intelligence Corps officer Colin Wallace stated that most of the loyalist killings in Armagh and Tyrone in 1975, including the Miami Showband killings, were carried out by the PAF; Wallace also noted the existence of a rumour of the PAF's connection to a "special duties team" operating out of Thiepval Barracks in Lisburn.

== Attacks ==
The name PAF was used to claim responsibility for the following attacks:

1970s

- 10 October 1974: Killing of Catholic civilian Albert Lutton, who was shot dead at a house in Newtownabbey, County Antrim.
- 11 October 1974: Killing of Catholic civilian James Hasty, who was shot dead as he walked to work along Brougham Street, north Belfast.
- 18 October 1974: Exploding a bomb outside a Catholic school in Belfast, injuring 12 people (including children).
- 18 October 1974: Shooting two Catholic street-sweepers in Belfast.
- 27 October 1974: Killing of Catholic civilian Anthony Duffy. His body was found at the back of a farmhouse at Mullantine, near Portadown, County Armagh. He had been beaten, strangled and then shot by UVF members after taking a lift from Lurgan to Portadown, together with a friend who managed to escape.
- 8 November 1974: Killing of Catholic civilian Paul Armstrong. He was found shot dead in a derelict bakery on Byron Street, north Belfast. This was claimed as retaliation for the Guildford pub bombings.
- 9 November 1974: Killing of Catholic civilians Patrick Courtney and William Tierney. They were shot dead at a garage owned by Courtney near Templepatrick, County Antrim.
- 12 November 1974: Killing of Catholic civilian Michael Brennan. He was shot dead at St Mary Youth Centre on Carolan Road, south Belfast.
- 20 November 1974: Gun attack on Falls Bar at Aughamullen, near Clonoe, County Tyrone. Catholic civilian Patrick Falls was killed and another wounded. UDR soldier James Somerville, a member of the Glenanne gang, was convicted for the attack. It was claimed as retaliation for the killing of a Royal Ulster Constabulary (RUC) officer in Craigavon earlier that day.
- 1 April 1975: Killing of Catholic civilian Dorothy Trainor. She and her husband were shot by at least two gunmen as they walked through a park near Garvaghy Road, Portadown. Two of her sons were later killed by loyalists. The attack has been linked to the Glenanne gang.
- 3 April 1975: Killing of Catholic civilian Martin McVeigh. He was shot dead near his home at Ballyoran Park, off the Garvaghy Road in Portadown, as he cycled home from work. Alleged RUC agent Robin Jackson—a member of the Glenanne gang—was later arrested in possession of the murder weapon, but the RUC did not question or charge him with the murder.
- 5 April 1975: Bomb attack on McLaughlin's bar in the New Lodge area of north Belfast. Catholic civilians Kevin Kane and Michael Coyle were killed.
- 11 April 1975: Killing of Catholic civilian Owen Boyle. Gunmen shot him through the window of his house in Glencull, near Aughnacloy, County Tyrone. He died on 22 April 1975. The attack has been linked to the Glenanne gang.
- 21 April 1975: Killing of Catholic civilians Marion Bowen (who was eight months pregnant), and her brothers Seamus McKenna and Michael McKenna. They were killed by a booby-trap bomb left in Bowen's house at Killyliss, near Granville, County Tyrone. Seamus and Michael were renovating the house, which had been unoccupied for almost a year. The attack has been linked to the Glenanne gang.
- 27 April 1975: Gun attack on a social club in Bleary, County Down. Gunmen burst into the Catholic-frequented darts club and opened fire indiscriminately. Catholic civilians Joseph Toman, John Feeney and Brendan O'Hara were killed and ten others were wounded. The attack has been linked to the Glenanne gang.
- 14 May 1975: An attempted bomb attack on the Catholic-owned Hill Tavern in Belfast. A 15 lb bomb was thrown into the pub but the security guard kicked it outside before it exploded. Seven were wounded by the blast.
- 21 May 1975: A bomb attack on the Christian Brothers Past Pupils Union building on Antrim Road in north Belfast.
- 22 May 1975: Killing of Catholic civilian Gerald D'Eath. He was killed by a booby-trap bomb hidden in a flask at the building site where he was working on Hightown Road, Newtownabbey.
- 23 May 1975: Killing of Catholic brothers John and Thomas McErlane; both civilians. A Protestant colleague had lured them to a flat in Mount Vernon, north Belfast. The two brothers had been playing cards when gunmen forced them to lie face-down and shot them in the head.
- 19 June 1975: Killing of Catholic civilian Francis Bradley. He was killed by a bomb left in an oil can at a filling station on Great Patrick Street, north Belfast.
- 20 June 1975: Killing of Catholic civilian Anthony Molloy. He was shot dead at his home on Ballymena Street, north Belfast.
- 22 June 1975: Killing of Catholic civilian Hugh Brankin. He was found shot dead on the road to the Knockagh Monument, near Newtownabbey.
- 24 August 1975: Killing of Catholic civilians Colm McCartney and Sean Farmer, who were found shot dead at Altnamachin, near Newtownhamilton, County Armagh. They were driving home from a Gaelic football match in Dublin when they were apparently stopped at a fake military checkpoint by men in British Army uniform. They were found shot dead a short distance away. RUC officer John Weir claims that a fellow RUC officer confessed to partaking in the attack, alongside a UDR soldier and UVF members. The attack has been linked to the Glenanne gang.
- 4 January 1976: Reavey and O'Dowd killings. At about 6pm, gunmen broke into the Reavey family home in Whitecross, County Armagh. They shot brothers John, Brian and Anthony Reavey; all Catholic civilians. John and Brian were killed outright while Anthony died of a brain hemorrhage less than a month later. Twenty minutes after the shooting, gunmen broke into the O'Dowd family home in Ballydougan, about twenty miles away. They shot dead Joseph O'Dowd and his nephews Barry and Declan O'Dowd. All three were members of the SDLP. Barney O'Dowd was wounded by gunfire. The attack has been linked to the Glenanne gang. RUC officer Billy McConnell admitted taking part in the Reavey killings and accused RUC reserve officer James Mitchell of being involved too. According to Weir, UDR Corporal Robert McConnell was the lead gunman in the Reavey killings and Robin Jackson was the lead gunman in the O'Dowd killings.

1980s

- 24 October 1982: Killing of Catholic civilian Joseph Donegan. He was kidnapped and beaten-to-death in an alley off Brookmount Street in the Shankill area of Belfast. The killing was carried out by Lenny Murphy and two other members of the Shankill Butchers. It was claimed as retaliation for the IRA's kidnapping and killing of a UDR soldier in Glenanne. Murphy was himself killed by the IRA on 16 November.
- 25 October 1982: Killing of civilian Sinn Féin member Peter Corrigan. He was shot from a passing car while walking along Loughgall Road, Armagh. A UDR soldier, who was also a UVF member, was convicted of the murder and for six other attempted murders.
- 20 November 1982: Killing of Catholic civilian Michael Fay. He was found shot in his car on Mount Regan Avenue, Dundonald. The PAF claimed it was retaliation for the killing of Lenny Murphy and vowed to kill another three Catholics to avenge his death.
- 23 April 1983: Bomb attack on the Hole-in-the-Wall pub in Belfast, which was frequented by Catholics. There were no injuries.
- 29 October 1983: Killing of civilian Workers' Party member David Nocher. He was shot dead while cleaning a shop window on Mill Road, north Belfast.
- 8 November 1983: Killing of Catholic civilian Adrian Carroll. He was shot dead outside his home on Abbey Street, Armagh. In 1986, four UDR soldiers – the "UDR Four" – were convicted of the murder.
- 5 December 1983: Killing of Irish National Liberation Army member Joseph Craven. He was shot from a passing motorbike on Church Road, Newtownabbey.
- 31 October 1984: Killing of Catholic civilian Harry Muldoon. He was shot dead at his home on Mountainview Drive, north Belfast.
- 23 November 1984: Killing of civilian Sinn Féin member William McLaughlin. He was shot dead on Church Road, Newtownabbey; the same place where Joseph Craven was killed the year before.
- 10 July 1986: Killing of Catholic civilian Brian Leonard. He was shot while working at a building site on Snugville Street, in the Shankill area of Belfast, and died on 12 July.
- 14 July 1986: Killing of Catholic civilian Colm McCallan. He was shot near his home on Millview Court in north Belfast and died on 16 July.
- 19 July 1986: Killing of Catholic civilian Martin Duffy. A taxi driver, he was shot dead when lured to a bogus pickup at Chichester Park, north Belfast.
- 16 September 1986: Killing of Catholic civilian Raymond Mooney. He was shot dead in the grounds of Holy Cross Roman Catholic Church in the Ardoyne area of north Belfast. This was claimed as retaliation for the killing of UVF member John Bingham two days before.
- 17 September 1986: Killing of Catholic civilian Joseph Webb. He was shot dead at his amusement arcade in Smithfield, north of Belfast city centre.
- 15 May 1988: Gun attack on the Avenue Bar on Union Street, north of Belfast city centre. Three Catholic civilians were killed: Stephen McGahon, Damian Devlin and Paul McBride.
- 8 August 1988: Killing of Catholic civilians Seamus Morris and Peter Dolan. They were shot from a passing car while walking along Brompton Park and Etna Drive in the Ardoyne area of north Belfast.
- 10 March 1989: Killing of Catholic civilian James McCartney. A security man, he was shot dead outside the Orient Bar on Springfield Road, Belfast.

1990s

- 7 January 1990: Killing of Catholic civilian Martin Byrne. A taxi driver, he was found shot dead in his car at Aghacommon, near Lurgan, north County Armagh. The PAF claimed it was retaliation for the killings of loyalist militants Harry Dickey and Robert Metcalfe.
- 6 October 1990: Killing of Catholic civilian Denis Carville. He was shot while sitting in a car with his girlfriend at Oxford Island, near Lurgan, north County Armagh. This was believed to be a retaliation for the shooting of a UDR soldier at the same spot on 23 September 1990. It has been alleged that the killing was organized by RUC officers and carried out by Mid Ulster UVF leader Billy Wright.
- 24 October 1990: Killing of Catholic civilian Francis Hughes. A taxi driver, he was found shot dead in his burnt out car on Derryane Road, near Maghery, north County Armagh. This was claimed as retaliation for the killing of Protestant taxi driver in Belfast: UVF member William Aitken.
- 28 March 1991: Killing of three Catholic civilians at a mobile shop in Craigavon, north County Armagh. Two teen girls (Eileen Duffy, Katrina Rennie) and a man (Brian Frizzell) were shot dead. This was claimed as retaliation for the alleged shooting and wounding of a Protestant woman. It has been claimed that alleged RUC agent Robin Jackson was involved in the attack. Investigative journalist Paul Larkin suggested that it was organized by Jackson upon receiving complaints from UDR soldiers after they had been refused service and insulted by the mobile shop employees. In The Committee, journalist Sean McPhilemy alleges that the attack was organized by RUC officers and carried out by Jackson.

== Recent events ==
In July 2021, the group's emblem appeared on a wall in the Mourneview Estate in Lurgan. On 1 November, a Translink bus was hijacked and burned in Newtownards by a group using the name, claiming it to be the start of a campaign against the Northern Ireland Protocol.

== See also ==
- Timeline of Ulster Volunteer Force actions
- Red Hand Commando
- Catholic Reaction Force
