= 1991 Craigavon killings =

November 1991 gun attack in Northern Ireland

- Part of the Troubles
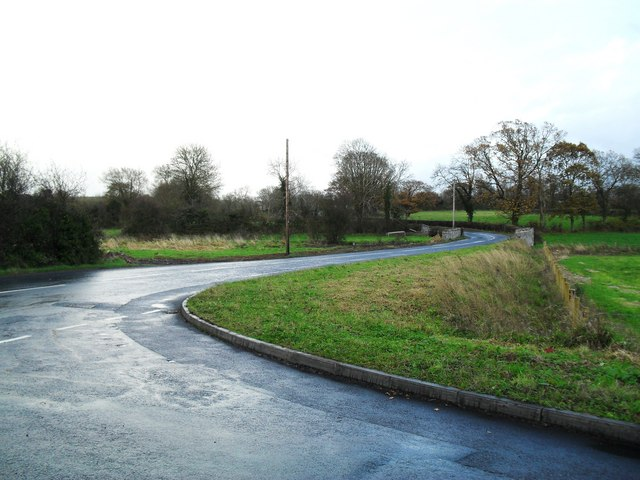
- The location of the killings in 2009

- 1991 Craigavon killings (Northern Ireland)
- Location: Craigavon, County Armagh, Northern Ireland
- Date: 14 November 1991
- Attack type: shooting
- Weapon: AK-47
- Deaths: 3 civilians
- Perpetrator: Ulster Volunteer Force

On 14 November 1991 the Ulster Volunteer Force (UVF), a loyalist paramilitary group, shot dead three civilians in Craigavon, County Armagh, Northern Ireland. The three men were driving home from work at the Hyster forklift factory.

== Background ==
The UVF Mid-Ulster Brigade, based in the Craigavon area, stepped up its attacks in the early 1990s. At this time it was led by Billy Wright from Portadown. In March 1991, the UVF shot dead three Catholic civilians (two teenage girls and a man) at a mobile shop in Craigavon (see 1991 Drumbeg killings).

On 13 November 1991, the Provisional IRA killed four Protestants in Belfast. At a house on Lecale Street, the IRA shot dead a member of the Ulster Defence Association (UDA) and his stepson, a member of the Red Hand Commando. On Crumlin Road, the IRA shot dead two Protestant civilians who were renovating a house. The previous owner, a loyalist militant, was the intended target. It is possible the Craigavon killings were retaliation.

== Shooting ==
The UVF set up an illegal checkpoint on the Carbet Road–Carn Road junction, near the Hyster factory. It was intended to look like a regular British Army checkpoint, and the UVF members flashed a red torch to signal to people to pull over. Fergus Magee (28) was getting a lift home with Desmond Rogers (54) when they were stopped at the checkpoint. A masked man wearing army fatigues and carrying an AK-47 assault rifle walked along the row of stopped cars until he reached Desmond Rogers' car. He fired into the car, killing Rogers outright and fatally wounding Magee. Both men were Catholic civilians. John Lavery (27), who was in the car behind, tried to reverse out of the way, but the UVF gunman ran over to him and fired into his car, fatally wounding him. Lavery was a Protestant civilian. The UVF later issued an apology for killing John Lavery because he was a Protestant.

UVF member Vicky Ahitty from Portadown was sentenced to life in October 1992 for the killings along with the murders of Kevin and John McKearney at their shop in Moy in January 1992. Kevin McKearney was the brother of three former IRA members.

The UVF had previously set up fake British Army checkpoints in carrying out the Miami Showband killings in July 1975, and the killing of two Catholic civilians near Newtownhamilton in August 1975.

== See also ==
- 1991 Cappagh killings
- 1991 Drumbeg killings
- Loughinisland massacre
