= Craigavon mobile shop killings =

March 1991 loyalist gun attack in Northern Ireland

- Part of the Troubles
- Location: Drumbeg estate in Craigavon, County Armagh, Northern Ireland
- Date: 28 March 1991
- Attack type: Shooting
- Weapon: 9mm Browning pistol
- Deaths: 3 civilians
- Perpetrator: Ulster Volunteer Force

On 28 March 1991, a member of the Ulster Volunteer Force (UVF), a loyalist paramilitary group, shot dead three Catholic civilians at a mobile shop in Craigavon, County Armagh, Northern Ireland. The gunman boarded the van and shot two teenage girls working there, then forced a male customer to lie on the pavement and shot him also. The killings were claimed by the "Protestant Action Force", who alleged the mobile shop was owned by an Irish republican. Staff said they had been harassed by Ulster Defence Regiment (UDR) soldiers for not serving them.

The killings were carried out by the Mid-Ulster UVF, which was commanded by Billy Wright. A UVF member was convicted and imprisoned in 1995 for being the getaway driver. He and another loyalist named the killer, but he has never been charged. Relatives of the victims took a civil case against him, and in 2021, Belfast High Court issued an order holding him liable for the killings.

== Background ==
The UVF Mid-Ulster Brigade, based in the Craigavon, Portadown and Lurgan area, stepped up its attacks in the early 1990s. On 3 March 1991, it carried out a gun attack on a pub in Cappagh, County Tyrone, killing three Provisional IRA members and a Catholic civilian.

Loyalist sources later told the Sunday World newspaper the attack had been ordered and planned in Portadown by Mid-Ulster UVF commander Billy Wright (died 1997) and Mark Fulton (died 2002), and carried out by other members of their unit.

== Shooting ==
On the evening of 28 March 1991, three girls—Eileen Duffy (19), Katrina Rennie (16) and Jamie Smith (14)—were working in a mobile shop parked in Drumbeg, a mainly-Catholic estate in Craigavon. One was standing serving at the back of the shop, and another was sitting on a counter. A blue van pulled up and a UVF gunman got out; he was wearing a black balaclava, a military-style jacket and carrying a 9mm Browning pistol. Some customers fled, but the three girls had nowhere to go as the gunman boarded the van. He pulled Jamie by the hair, calling her a "Fenian slut", and threw her out. He then shot Eileen and Katrina in the head, killing them. A customer, Brian Frizzell (29), was walking towards the shop as the gunman left. The gunman forced him to lie on the ground, then shot him twice in the head as Jamie looked on. The gunman was driven away and the car was found burnt out in the Mourneview estate.

The UVF claimed the killings using the covername "Protestant Action Force". It claimed the mobile shop was "owned by known IRA killer John Jenkinson", stating that "Republican businesses and their staff" were "legitimate targets". There were claims the owner of the mobile shop had been harassed by British soldiers of the local Ulster Defence Regiment (UDR) for refusing to serve them. He was quoted as saying in the Irish News: "The UDR made a point of coming into the van and trying to get served. I wasn't ignorant but I told them I was unable to serve them because of the area". Irish republicans had a strong presence in the estate. Locals noted that, on the night of the shooting, the normally heavy police presence had disappeared, and police took almost half an hour to arrive on scene, despite the police station being five minutes away.

Eileen's brother Brendan Duffy was one of the first at the shop after the attack, he described the scene:

Brian Frizzell was lying in a pool of blood. Katrina was still sitting on the crate. She was dead but her blue eyes were wide open and there was a bullet wound on her neck. Eileen was slumped on the floor, shot in the head. Her face was badly swollen and blood was pumping out of her head and ears. I tried to resuscitate her but in my heart I knew she was gone. I was so numb, I couldn't cry.

== Aftermath ==
The killings drew widespread condemnation from both the Catholic and Protestant communities in Northern Ireland. The funerals were attended by thousands of people.

On 9 April, the IRA shot dead Protestant civilian Derek Ferguson at his mobile home in Coagh. His company did building work for the security forces, and the IRA claimed he was a loyalist militant. Aaron Edwards says the shooting was retaliation for the mobile shop killings.

Eight months after the attack, in November 1991, the UVF killed three more civilians in another mass shooting in Craigavon. The three men, two Catholics and a Protestant, were shot after leaving work when their cars were stopped by UVF members (see 1991 Craigavon killings).

== Perpetrators ==
In 1995, loyalist Thomas Harper was convicted and imprisoned for being the getaway driver and burning the van used in the attack. Harper had told police interrogators that Portadown man Alan Oliver was the killer, and named Anthony McNeill as also being involved, but neither have been charged. In 2019, convicted UVF member Laurence Maguire accused Oliver of being involved in ten to fifteen killings. At the same time, the Sunday Life newspaper revealed that Oliver had met the police Historical Enquiries Team, telling them he would be willing to confess to his crimes if given immunity from prosecution. It was also revealed that Oliver is a prominent member of Elim Pentecostal Church in Portadown. The victims' relatives were outraged that the church continued to praise his "exemplary service" in its community work, and refused to meet them.

Families of the victims took a civil case against Alan Oliver. In 2021, Belfast High Court issued an order holding him liable for the killings.

There are allegations that the security forces colluded with the UVF, and that some of those involved were protected police informers. Locals said the security forces regularly patrolled the area, but were absent on the night of the shooting. Files related to the murders—and others from the time—were destroyed by police in 1998 because they were stored in a building contaminated with asbestos. It is also noted the alleged killer was never charged, despite being named by the getaway driver and arrested several times.

== See also ==
- Timeline of Ulster Volunteer Force actions
