= Derrymacash =

Village in County Armagh, Northern Ireland

Coordinates: 54.479°N 6.403°W

Derrymacash: Irish: Doire Mhic Cais; The Cash
- Location within Northern Ireland
- Population: 629 (2001)
- Irish grid reference: J035601
  - Belfast: 25 mi (40 km)
  - Dublin: 78 mi (126 km)
- District: Armagh City, Banbridge and Craigavon
- County: County Armagh
- Country: Northern Ireland
- Sovereign state: United Kingdom
- Post town: CRAIGAVON
- Postcode district: BT66
- Dialling code: 028
- Police: Northern Ireland
- Fire: Northern Ireland
- Ambulance: Northern Ireland
- UK Parliament: Upper Bann
- NI Assembly: Upper Bann

Derrymacash (from Irish Doire Mhic Cais, meaning 'Oakgrove of MacCash') is a small village and townland in County Armagh, Northern Ireland. It is about four miles west of Lurgan, between the M1 motorway and Lough Neagh. It had a population of 629 in the 2001 census.

A Catholic church and primary school (both called St Patrick's) are in neighbouring Aghacommon. Many people mistake the townlands of Derrymacash and Aghacommon. Derrymacash starts after one crosses the Closet River, just beyond the M1 bridge, heading towards Lough Neagh Via Ronan Nixon.

== Places of interest ==
Near Derrymacash is the nature reserve Oxford Island, which is known for its nature trails, bogland, bird hides and species of wildlife.

== Sport ==
The main sports in Derrymacash are Gaelic football and camogie, represented by the Wolfe Tone GAC and St Enda's GAA clubs. Both play their home games in Páirc na Ropairí. Dylan Hoy And Jon-Jo McCarron are well known sportspeople from the village.
