= Craigavon =

Town in County Armagh, Northern Ireland (founded 1965)

Coordinates: 54.447222°N 6.388333°W

Craigavon: Irish: Creag Abhann
- Town
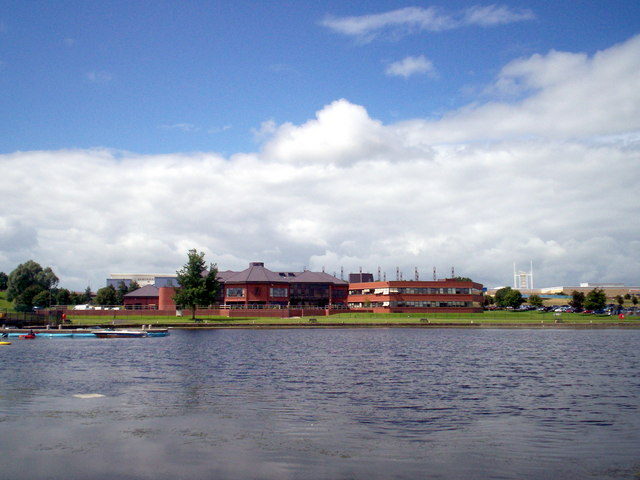
- Craigavon Civic Centre from Craigavon Lakes

- Location within Northern Ireland
- Population: 22,518 (2021)
- Irish grid reference: J042562
  - Belfast: 21 miles (34 km)
- District: Armagh City, Banbridge and Craigavon
- County: County Armagh
- Country: Northern Ireland
- Sovereign state: United Kingdom
- Post town: CRAIGAVON
- Postcode district: BT62–BT67
- Dialling code: 028
- Police: Northern Ireland
- Fire: Northern Ireland
- Ambulance: Northern Ireland
- UK Parliament: Upper Bann
- NI Assembly: Upper Bann
- Website: www.craigavon.gov.uk

Craigavon (/kreɪˈɡævən/ kray-GAV-ən) is a town in north County Armagh, Northern Ireland. It was a planned settlement, begun in 1965, and named after the first Prime Minister of Northern Ireland: James Craig, 1st Viscount Craigavon. It was intended to be the heart of a new linear city incorporating Lurgan and Portadown, but this plan was mostly abandoned and later described as having been flawed. Locally, "Craigavon" refers to the urban area between the two towns. It is built beside a pair of artificial lakes and is made up of a large residential area (Brownlow), a second smaller one (Mandeville), plus a central area (Highfield) that includes a substantial shopping centre, a courthouse and the district council headquarters. The area around the lakes is a public park and wildlife haven made up of woodland with walking trails. There is also a watersports centre, golf course and ski slope in the area. In most of Craigavon, motor vehicles are completely separated from pedestrians, and roundabouts are used extensively. Its "town centre" differs from traditional town centres, as there are no traditional streets.

Craigavon sometimes refers to the much larger Craigavon Urban Area, a name used by the Northern Ireland Statistics and Research Agency, which includes Craigavon, Lurgan, Portadown and Aghacommon. Craigavon settlement has a population of about 22,000, or about 30% of the wider urban area, which has a population of 72,300.

== History ==
=== Original plans ===
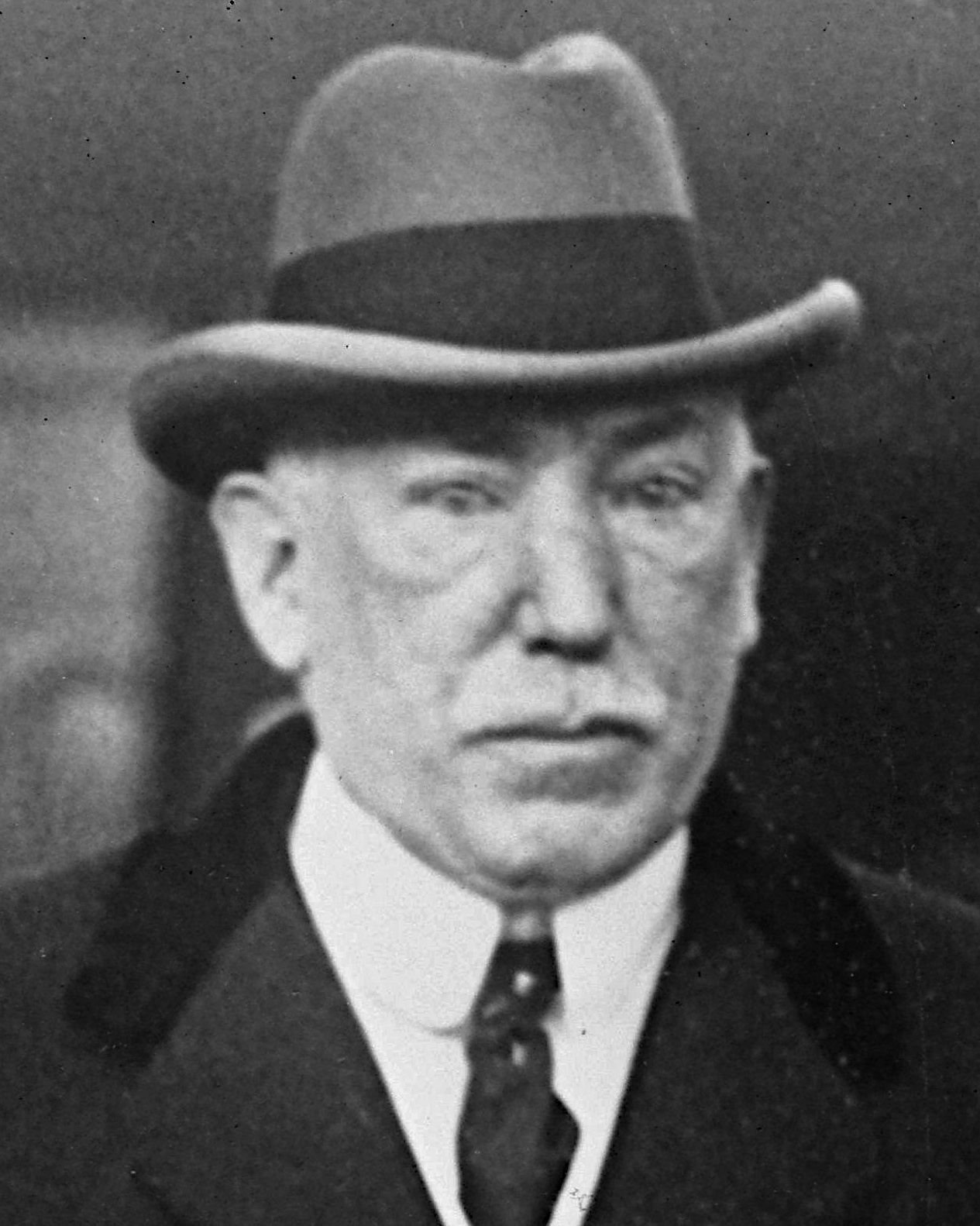
Lord Craigavon

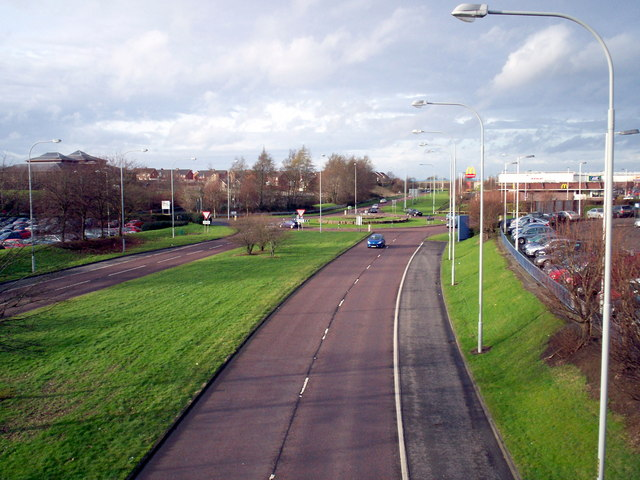
Central Way

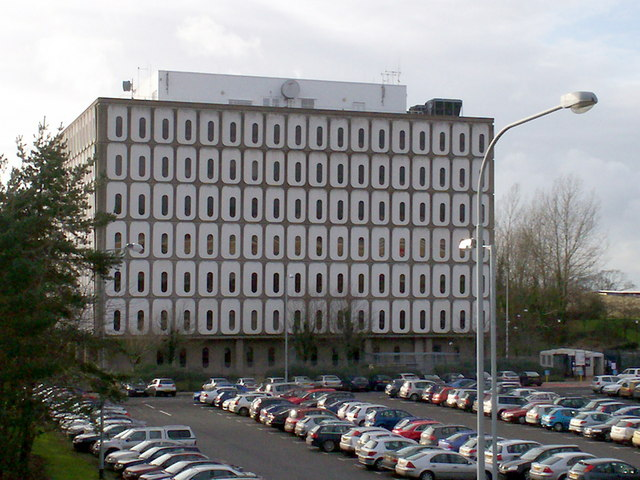
Marlborough House, central Craigavon, built in the 1970s

Craigavon was planned as a 'new city' for Northern Ireland that would mirror towns such as Cumbernauld and, later, Milton Keynes in Great Britain. It was conceived as a linear city that would link the towns of Lurgan and Portadown to create a single urban area and identity. The argument for a new town was based on projections indicating population increases over the following decades that would require large-scale house building. Similar projects successfully attracting economic growth had been successfully completed in Great Britain, so it was in some ways a symbol of Northern Ireland as both modern and a part of the British mainstream. The Craigavon Development Commission was appointed in October 1965 to develop the 'new city'. About 6,000 acres of land between Lurgan and Portadown was vested from farmers at £6 an acre. Several reasons have been suggested for the suitability of the site including the existing population centres, industrial base, nearness to Belfast and the belief that Craigavon would help spread development away from Belfast. It was hoped that residents of Belfast would be attracted by the suburban nature of Craigavon's design and that business would see it as an interesting alternative. Cash incentives were offered to some families moving to Craigavon. The M1 motorway was built to link the new city with Belfast and there were plans to replace the Lurgan and Portadown railway stations with a single high speed terminal in central Craigavon. The Craigavon Area Hospital was built to replace small hospitals in the two towns.

The design of Craigavon was based on Modernism and imbued with the spirit of the age. The design team was headed by the Scottish architect James Moffatt Aitken, formerly Chief Architect to the Ministry of Health and then Chief Planner for the Ministry of Development in Northern Ireland. The plan separated motor vehicles from pedestrians and cyclists wherever possible, creating a network of paths allowing residents to travel across Craigavon without encountering traffic. The road network for motor vehicles used roundabouts instead of traffic lights at junctions, giving the planners the ability to easily increase the number of lanes if it became necessary. Electricity and other cables were placed underground and street lighting was standard throughout. The planners clustered the housing developments around small 'village centres' with associated retail space, leisure facilities, post offices, primary schools, pharmacies, community centres and other civic amenities. All estates were built with security in mind, with one vehicle entry/exit point. Single-use zoning was part of the design; there was a total separation of industrial land-use from all other uses.

Craigavon was designed to be a very child-friendly environment with small playgrounds dotted throughout the residential areas. There was an emphasis on providing green space in the housing estates and safe paths to cycle on. National Cycle Route 9 passes through the town. The new town was also provided with many civic amenities including a leisure centre, library, shopping centre, civic centre, a large park with artificial lakes, playing fields, a petting zoo, public gardens and an artificial ski slope. Craigavon Civic Centre was built at a cost of £3 million and was officially opened by the Duke of Abercorn in April 1983.

=== Difficulties ===
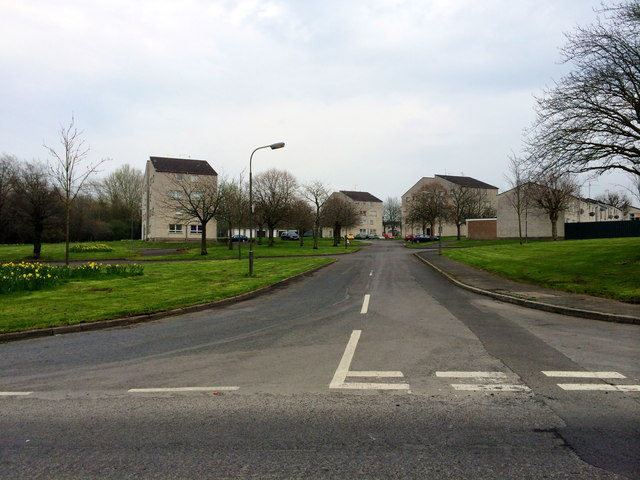
Drumgor Heights, showing the Modernist housing design once common in Craigavon

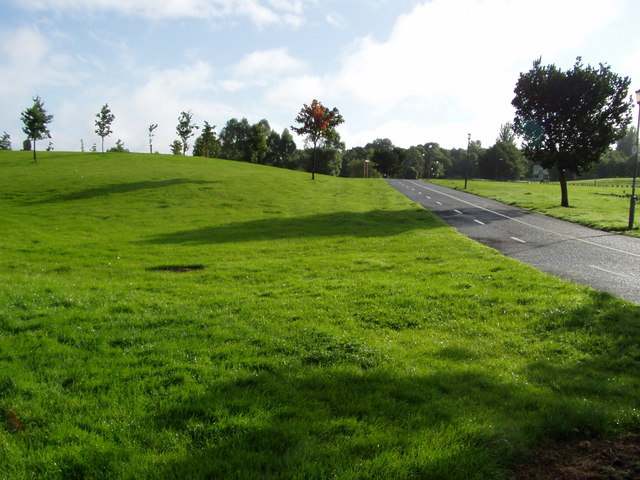
One of the many cycle paths in Craigavon

There was controversy over the decision to build a 'new city' in the mainly Protestant/unionist east rather than to develop the mainly Catholic city of Derry. There was also controversy over the decision to name it after the James Craig, 1st Viscount Craigavon (1871–1940), a Protestant unionist leader. Some unionists also felt the decision was unwise and counterproductive to building cross-community relations. Knockmena (a corruption of the townland name, Knockmenagh) was the preferred name nationalists hoped would be used, and which might have attracted broad acceptance on both sides. On 6 July 1965, it was announced that the new city would be named Craigavon after Craig. A noted nationalist, Joseph Connellan, interrupted the announcement with the comment, "A Protestant city for a Protestant people". Irish Labour MP Gerry Fitt described the naming of the new city as "a calculated insult" and Nationalist MP for East Tyrone Austin Currie said "To call this new city after someone who is looked upon by over one-third of the population as an arch-bigot is something that ought to be abhorred."

Problems began to come to light when it emerged that some housing estates had been built with materials and techniques that had not been fully tested, with the result that insulation, sound-proofing and durability were lacking. This was compounded by the outbreak of The Troubles in the late 1960s, which resulted in sectarian violence and segregation. Investment into Northern Ireland dried up and emigration rose. The Craigavon Development Commission was wound up in 1973 and Craigavon Borough Council created. The area's main employer, Goodyear, had a large fan-belt factory in the Silverwood industrial estate, and at the time it was Europe's largest factory. However, the plant failed to make money on a consistent basis, and had to shut in 1983.

Consequently, about half of what was planned was never built, and of what was built, some had to be demolished after becoming empty and derelict. The area designated as Craigavon 'city centre', for much of this time contained only the municipal authority, the court buildings and a shopping mall, surrounded by greenfield land. Dr Stephen McKay, director of education at the School of Planning, Architecture & Civil Engineering at Queen's University Belfast, said that the plan to build Craigavon was "flawed from the outset", adding: "The cycle ways, mixed housing and recreational zones were really never going to work in light of the circumstances". Locally-born writer Newton Emerson said: "As a child, I didn't notice the failure of Craigavon. The new city was an enormous playground of hidden cycle paths, roads that ended suddenly in the middle of nowhere and futuristic buildings standing empty in an artificial landscape". Craigavon became notorious for its many roundabouts.

The identity of a new city never really caught on. The name 'Craigavon' is today used by locals to refer to the area between Lurgan and Portadown, and many citizens of those towns resent being identified with the 'new city' of Craigavon. The intention to integrate the new city also largely failed, with those who were encouraged to move from other parts of Northern Ireland generally choosing where to live based on proximity to each respective town, i.e., Catholics/nationalists moved to estates close to Lurgan, whereas Protestants/unionists gravitated towards the Portadown area. A certain degree of integration that existed when Craigavon was first built in the 1960s crumbled in the 1970s against a backdrop of escalating violence; in one week in 1972, as a result of Loyalist intimidation, fifty families fled the Killicomaine estate: half the Catholic population in the area. By the end of the year, another twenty had gone. Protestants were also targeted and five narrowly escaped being burnt to death in their fish and chip shop in Churchill Park in February 1973.

=== The Troubles ===
There were many violent incidents in Craigavon related to the Troubles, in which a number of people were killed.

On 11 November 1982, three Provisional Irish Republican Army (IRA) members—Eugene Toman (21), Sean Burns (21) and Gervaise McKerr (31)—were shot dead by undercover Royal Ulster Constabulary officers at a vehicle checkpoint on Tullygally East Road. They were unarmed, leading to claims of a shoot-to-kill policy by security forces. The RUC denied this, saying the men had driven through the checkpoint.

The Craigavon mobile shop killings took place on 28 March 1991, when the Ulster Volunteer Force (UVF) shot dead three Catholic civilians in the Drumbeg estate. A gunman shot the two teenage girls working in the mobile shop: Eileen Duffy (19) and Katrina Rennie (16). He then forced a male customer, Brian Frizzell (29), to lie on the pavement and shot him also. There are allegations of collusion between the UVF and police.

On 14 November 1991 the UVF shot dead three more civilians on Carbet Road as they were driving home from work at the Hyster forklift factory: Desmond Rogers (54), Fergus Magee (28), and John Lavery (27).

The Continuity IRA shot dead PSNI officer Stephen Carroll in Craigavon on 10 March 2009, the first police fatality in Northern Ireland since the Good Friday Agreement in 1998.

== Geography ==
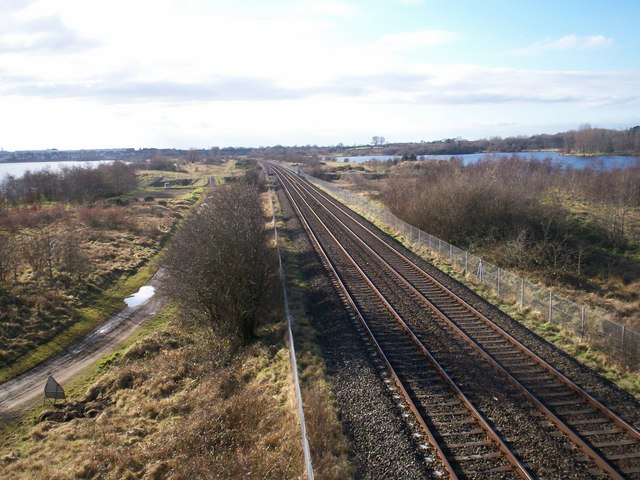
The Belfast–Dublin railway line between Craigavon Lakes

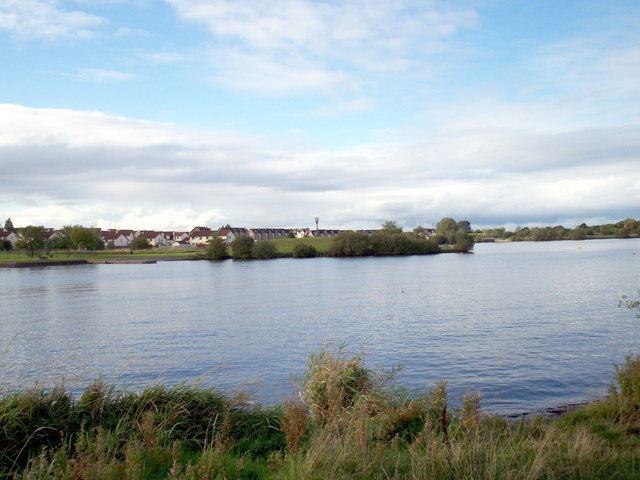
Craigavon Lakes

Craigavon lies on an area of flat land near the southeastern shore of Lough Neagh. The surrounding settlements (listed clockwise) are Aghacommon (north), Lurgan (northeast), Corcreeny (east), Bleary (southeast) and Portadown (southwest). It is separated from these surrounding settlements mostly by fields.

Craigavon is built beside two artificial lakes called Craigavon Lakes. The Portadown–Lurgan railway line runs between the two lakes, and further north is the M1 motorway, which runs parallel with the railway line. The area around Craigavon Lakes is a public park and wildlife haven made up of woodland with walking trails. In 2017 it was awarded the best park in Northern Ireland by Fields in Trust. Recent plans to build in the park, beginning with a college campus, have met opposition from some locals.

=== Townlands ===
Much of Craigavon is within the civil parish of Seagoe. The following is a list of townlands within Craigavon's urban area (excluding Lurgan, Portadown and Bleary), along with their likely etymologies:

- Balteagh (from Irish Bailte Fhiaich 'Fiach's townlands')
- Clanrolla (from Cluain Drola meaning "meadow of the shaft")
- Crossmacahilly (from Cros Mhic Eachmhilidh meaning "McAughley's crossroads")
- Drumgask (from Druim gCásca meaning "Easter ridge")
- Drumgor (from Druim gCorr meaning "ridge of the herons")
- Drumnagoon (from Dromainn Uí Dhubháin meaning "O'Doone's ridge")
- Knockmenagh (from An Cnoc Meánach meaning "the middle hill")
- Legaghory or Legahory (from Log a' Choire meaning "hollow of the cauldron")
- Monbrief (historically also Moybreefe, perhaps from Má Bhreagh meaning "plain of the rising ground" or Má Bhréach, "plain of wolves")
- Moyraverty or Moyraferty (from Maigh Raifeartaigh meaning "Raifeartach's plain")
- Tamnafiglassan (from Tamhnach an Ghlasáin meaning "grassy field of the finch")
- Tannaghmore West (from Tamhnach Mór meaning "big grassy field")
- Tullygally (from Tulaigh Geala meaning "white hills")

== Demography ==
For census purposes, the new town of Craigavon – the mainly residential area between Portadown and Lurgan – is not treated as a separate settlement by the NI Statistics and Research Agency (NISRA), but is combined with Portadown, Lurgan and Aghacommon as the "Craigavon Urban Area". Within this, the new town roughly corresponds to the "Craigavon sector", although this includes Aghacommon village and a small part of Portadown. In the 2001 and 2011 censuses, the new town roughly corresponded with the Drumgask, Drumgor, Kernan and (part of) Taghnevan electoral wards.

=== Craigavon settlement ===
On the day of the last census (21 March 2021), the "Craigavon sector" of the wider Urban Area had a population of 22,518. This made up about 31% of the Urban Area. Of this population:

- 48.7% were Catholic or raised Catholic, 38.3% were Protestant or raised Protestant, 2% belonged to other religions, and 11% had no religion.
- 93.2% were White, and 6.8% were of other ethno-racial groups.
- 79.8% were born in Northern Ireland, and 20.2% were born in other countries.
- 88.4% spoke English as their main language, and 11.6% did not speak English as their main language, with the second most spoken being Polish (3.4%).

=== Craigavon Urban Area ===
National Identity of Craigavon Urban Area residents (2021)
Nationality	Per cent
British	35.9%
Irish	31.9%
Northern Irish	26.9%

Religious background of Craigavon Urban Area residents (2021)
Religion	Per cent
Roman Catholic	52.3%
Protestant	36.0%
No religion/Not stated	10.1%
Other religions	1.6%

On census day 2021, the usually resident population of the wider Craigavon Urban Area (Craigavon, Portadown, Lurgan, Aghacommon) was 72,301. Of these:

- 52% (37,797) were Catholic or raised Catholic, 36% (26,038) were Protestant or raised Protestant, 2% belonged to other religions, and 10% had no religion.
- 35.9% indicated that they had a British national identity, 31.8% had an Irish national identity and 26.8% had a Northern Irish national identity. Respondents could indicate more than one national identity.
- 93.5% were White, and 6.8% were of other ethno-racial groups.
- 79.4% were born in Northern Ireland, and 20.6% were born in other countries.
- 87% spoke English as their main language, and 13% did not speak English as their main language, with the next most spoken being Polish (3.6%) and Portuguese (2.3%).

On census day 2011 (27 March 2011), the usually resident population of Craigavon Urban Area was 64,323. Of these:

- 51% were Catholic or raised Catholic, and 43% were Protestant or raised Protestant.
- 44% indicated that they had a British national identity, 28% had an Irish national identity and 28% had a Northern Irish national identity. Respondents could indicate more than one national identity.
- 97.5% were White, and 2.5 were of other ethno-racial groups.
- 86% were born in Northern Ireland, and 14% were born in other countries.
- 92% spoke English as their main language, and 8% did not speak English as their main language, with the next most spoken being Polish (3%).

In the late 1970s and early 1980s, Craigavon hosted many families of Vietnam War refugees.

== Education ==
=== Primary ===
Craigavon has a number of primary schools, including:

- Drumgor Primary School (Controlled)
- St Anthony's Primary School (Catholic Maintained)
- St Brendan's Primary School (Catholic Maintained)
- Tullygally Primary School (Controlled) - a mixed religion school. It has about 100 pupils at any one time. It was built by the government with the original founding of Craigavon and was part of the library board. The size of the primary school was reduced in recent years and half of it now accommodates an adult learning centre. There are many more primary and secondary schools in the wider Craigavon areas of Lurgan, Portadown, etc.

=== Post-primary ===
Local secondary schools include Craigavon Integrated College (Controlled), which was one of the first integrated secondary schools in Northern Ireland. Lismore College (Catholic maintained) is also in the area.

There are also plans to build a Southern Regional College campus beside Craigavon Lake. The plans have met opposition from some locals, as it would involve the destruction of woodland which is home to endangered wildlife.

== Sport ==
The local Gaelic Athletic Association (GAA) club, Éire Óg Gaelic Football Club, competes in Division II of the Armagh All County League. The club has won both Junior and Intermediate honours.

Association football clubs associated with Craigavon include A.F.C. Craigavon and Craigavon City F.C.. Craigavon City, founded in 2007, won the John Magee Memorial Cup in its first season.

Craigavon Cowboys, the only American football team in County Armagh, won the IAFL DV8s league in 2009, and returned to the Irish American Football League (IAFL) proper in 2010.

== Twin towns ==
Craigavon is twinned with:

- LaGrange, Georgia, United States
- Ballina, County Mayo, Republic of Ireland

== See also ==
- List of towns and villages in Northern Ireland
