= Gabriola Sands Provincial Park =

Provincial park in British Columbia, Canada

- IUCN category II (national park)
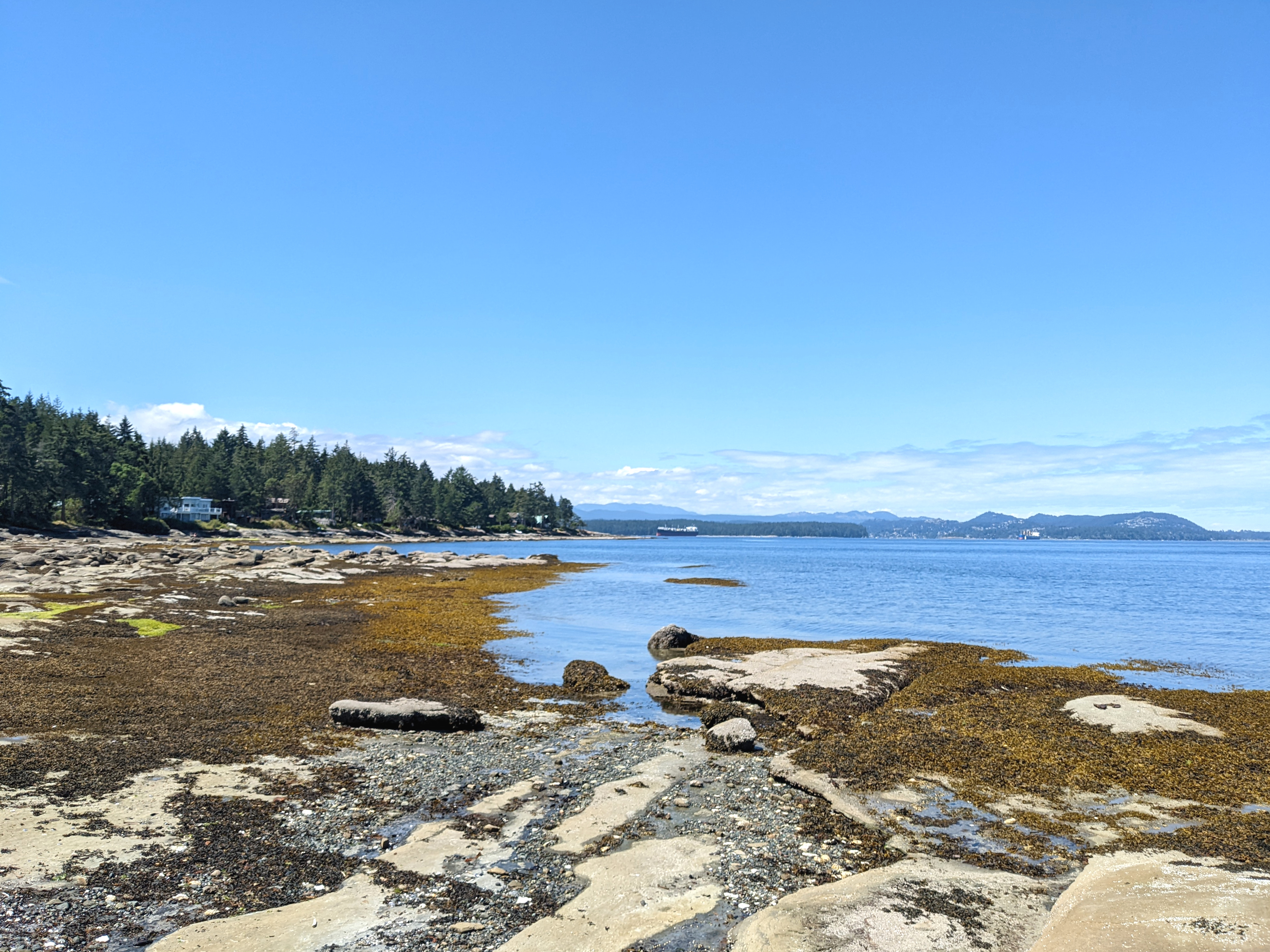
- Gabriola Sands Provincial Park

- Location within Vancouver Island Location within British Columbia
- Interactive map of Gabriola Sands Provincial Park
- Location: Nanaimo Land District, British Columbia, Canada
- Nearest city: Nanaimo, BC
- Coordinates: 49°11′39″N 123°51′33″W
- Area: 6 ha (15 acres)
- Established: June 28, 1960
- Governing body: BC Parks

Gabriola Sands Provincial Park is a provincial park in British Columbia, Canada. The park is located on an isthmus between Taylor Bay and Pilot Bay, and includes the beaches and waters of each. It has a day-use area with a fielded area that can be used for picnicking.
