= Aghacommon =

Village and townland in County Armagh, Northern Ireland

Coordinates: 54.468°N 6.383°W

Aghacommon: Irish: Achadh Camán; "field of the little bends"
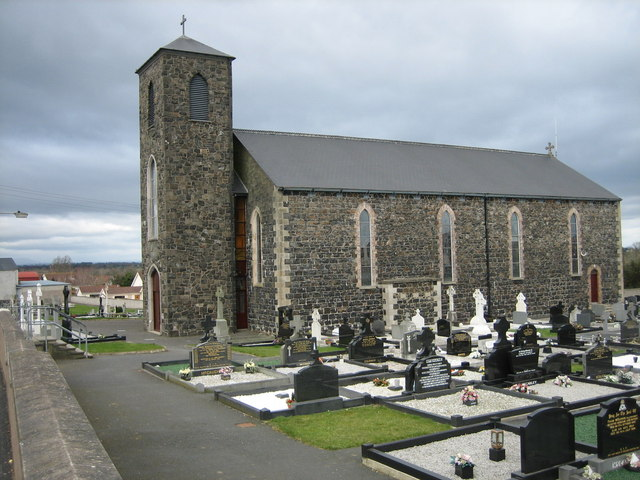
- St Patrick's Roman Catholic church, Aghacommon

- Location within Northern Ireland
- Irish grid reference: J035601
  - Belfast: 20 mi (32 km)
  - Dublin: 77 mi (124 km)
- District: Armagh City, Banbridge and Craigavon
- County: County Armagh
- Country: Northern Ireland
- Sovereign state: United Kingdom
- Post town: CRAIGAVON
- Postcode district: BT66
- Dialling code: 028
- Police: Northern Ireland
- Fire: Northern Ireland
- Ambulance: Northern Ireland
- UK Parliament: Upper Bann
- NI Assembly: Upper Bann

Aghacommon (from Irish Achadh Camán, meaning 'field of the little bends') is a small village and townland in north County Armagh, Northern Ireland. It lies between Derrymacash (to the northwest), Lurgan (to the east) and Craigavon (to the south). The M1 motorway and Dublin–Belfast railway line are on either side. The village covers the townlands of Aghacommon and Ballynamony. The village is sometimes confused with the neighbouring townland of Derrymacash.

Aghacommon has a Catholic church and primary school, both named for Saint Patrick. At the southern edge of the village is Craigavon lakes and Tannaghmore Animal Farm. The animal farm, which is open to the public, holds rare and endangered farm animals that were once widespread in Ulster. There is a farming museum on the site.

== Demographics ==
For census purposes, including for the 2011 census, Aghacommon is included in the Craigavon urban area. Both Aghacommon and Derrymacash lie within the Derrytrasna electoral ward and Derrytrasna 1 "Super Output Area" (SOA). On census day 2011, the resident population of that SOA was 2,896. Of this population 93% was Roman Catholic and 2% was Protestant, 42% was female and 58% was male, with 28% indicated as unemployed.
