= Drumbeg Provincial Park =

Provincial park in British Columbia

- IUCN category II (national park)
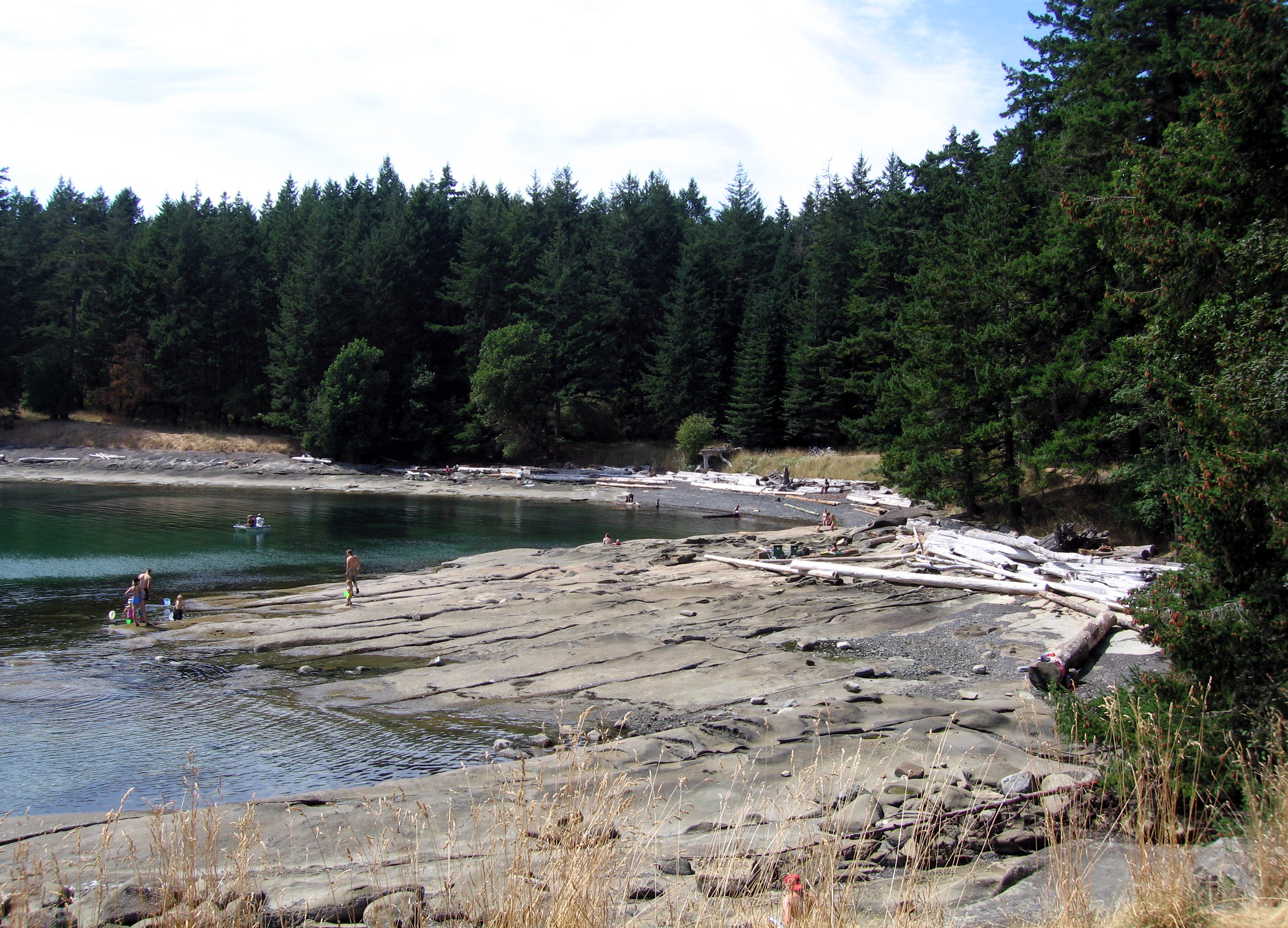
- Drumbeg Provincial Park

- Location within Vancouver Island Location within British Columbia
- Interactive map of Drumbeg Provincial Park
- Location: Nanaimo Land District, British Columbia, Canada
- Nearest city: Nanaimo, BC
- Coordinates: 49°07′57″N 123°41′39″W
- Area: 55 ha (140 acres)
- Established: 1971
- Governing body: BC Parks

Drumbeg Provincial Park is a provincial park on Gabriola Island in British Columbia, Canada.

== Gallery ==
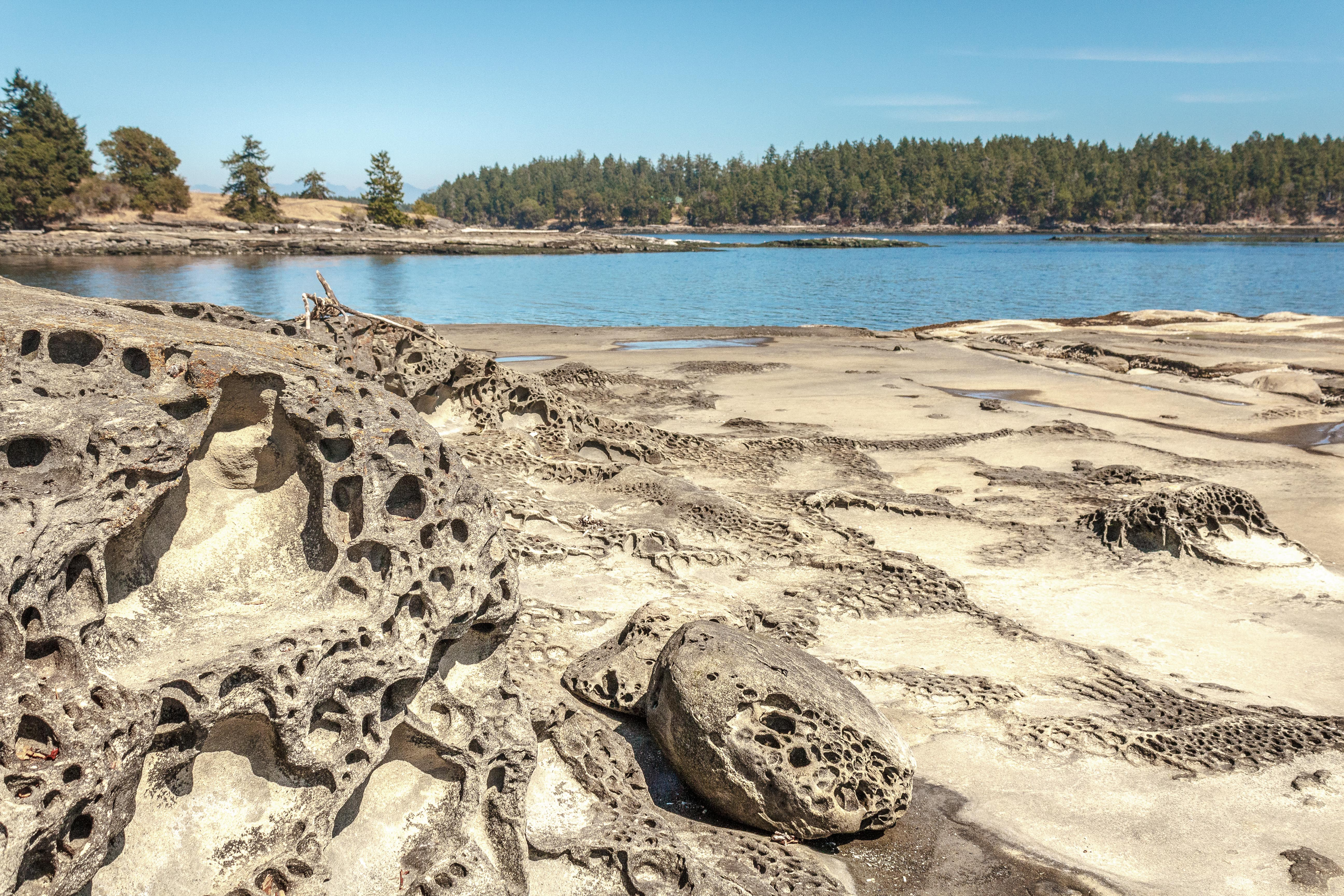
Low tide reveals the eroded sandstone beach at Drumbeg Provincial Park
