= Oxford Island =

Nature reserve in the United Kingdom

Coordinates: 54.48996°N 6.37525°W

Oxford Island is a National Nature Reserve and public recreation site on the southern shores of Lough Neagh at Lurgan, County Armagh. The site covers 282 acres (113 hectares) and is owned and maintained by Armagh City, Banbridge and Craigavon Borough Council. Much of the area is designated as a National Nature Reserve due to its wide variety of natural habitats. The purpose of all work on the island is to maintain biodiversity and to provide a recreation area for everyone.

== History ==
In 1846 the water level in Lough Neagh was lowered artificially for the first time, and Oxford Island became a peninsula. Under the Craigavon New City Plans, Oxford Island was acquired as a site for public recreation. At that time most of the land was cultivated or grazed so that any natural vegetation cover was eradicated. Since the acquisition by Craigavon Borough Council in the late 1960s, many thousands of mixed woodland trees have been planted, the Lough shore allowed to develop naturally and the meadows have largely reverted to species rich grassland.

== Activities and facilities ==
- Lough Neagh Discovery Centre: Built in 1993, the building contains 3 conference rooms, a cafe with great views of Lough Neagh, a gift and craft shop, a Tourist Information Point along with information on the local conservation and heritage. The Lagan Canal Trust also runs its operations out of the building.
- Kinnego Marina: The marina has 190 fully sheltered public berths as well as a caravan and camping park. The Lough Neagh Sailing Club in Northern Ireland, established in 1877, operates out of Kinnego Marina.
- Walking: The Island contains multiple trails which span a distance of 4 miles.
- Art space: An artist’s studio allowing visitors to see artists at work and workshops.
- Enterprize Barge: A restored Lagan Canal lighter which houses an exhibition on inland waterways.

== Management ==
In order to maintain biodiversity the site is carefully managed. Some of the grassland areas are cut for hay, while others are left for grazing by rare breeds including the Irish Moiled and Dexter cattle. Ongoing efforts to remove alien invasive species such as Himalayan Balsam which can threaten to take over from other native species including removing scrub from part of the shore line to enable the reed beds to flourish.

== Flora ==
Oxford Island contains a wealth of both rare and common wild plants. These include

- Hyacinthoides non-scripta (common bluebell)
- Silene dioica (red campion)
- Orchids
- Rhinanthus minor (yellow rattle)
- Lychnis flos-cuculi (ragged robin)
- Butomus (flowering rush)

== Fauna ==
=== Butterflies and moths ===
The following butterflies reside at the reserve:

- Large white (Pieris brassicae)
- Small white (Pieris rapae)
- Green-veined white (Pieris napi)
- Wood white (Leptidea sinapis)
- Orange tip (Anthocharis cardamines)
- Small tortoiseshell (Aglais urticae)
- Meadow brown (Maniola jurtina)
- Ringlet (Aphantopus hyperantus)
- Speckled wood (Pararge aegeria)
- Common blue (Polyommatus icarus)
- Small heath (Coenonympha pamphilus)
- Small copper (Lycaena phlaeas)
- Red admiral (Vanessa atalanta)
- European peacock (Aglais io)

About 60 species of moth have also been recorded.

=== Freshwater fish ===
Lough Neagh is famous for its fish. Some species include:

- Northern pike
- Perch
- Roach
- Common bream
- Brown trout
- Eel
- Gudgeon
- Lamprey
- Pollan
- Rainbow trout
- Dollaghan
- Migratory salmon

=== Winter birds ===
Lough Neagh attracts many species of bird and is designated as a Special Protection Area under EU legislation. It is especially noted for large numbers of wintering wildfowl which migrate from areas such as Iceland, Scandinavia and Siberia. These birds include:

- Goldeneye
- Common pochard
- Tufted duck
- Greater scaup
- Eurasian teal
- Wigeon
- Whooper swan
- Bewick's swan
- Lapwing
- Curlew

=== Summer birds ===
The following are some species of bird that arrive in the area during summer months:

- Common tern
- Sedge warbler
- Willow warbler
- Common house martin
- Swallow

=== Other fauna ===
Lough Neagh is famous for the Chironomidae (Chironomid midge fly). This small insect lives for most of its life in the water feeding on dead plant material. After about a year it rises to the surface where it changes into a pupa which then becomes the adult fly. Billions of flies perform a mating dance, swarming above the treetops around the Lough. The adult flies live for only a few days and are completely harmless as they have no mouth parts. The Chironomid is an important food source for many of the other species of animals.

== See also ==
- List of tourist attractions in Ireland
