= List of townlands of County Antrim =

In Ireland, counties are divided into Civil Parishes, which are further divided into townlands. The following is a list of townlands in County Antrim, Northern Ireland:

== A ==
Acravally, Aganlane (also known as Parkmore), Aghaboy, Aghacarnaghan, Aghacarnan, Aghacully, Aghadavy, Aghadolgan, Aghadrumglasny, Aghafatten, Aghagallon, Aghagheigh, Aghaleck, Aghalee, Aghalislone, Aghaloughan, Aghalum, Aghanamoney, Aghancrossy, Aghanliss, Aghavary, Aghnadarragh, Aghnadore, Aghnahough, Aghrunniaght, Agolagh, Aird, Alcrossagh, Alder Rock, Aldfreck, Aldorough, Altagore, Altarichard, Altaveedan South, Altigarron, Altilevelly, Altmore Lower, Altmore Upper, Altnahinch, Andraid, Annaghmore, Anticur, Antiville, Antynanum, Appletee, Araboy, Ardagh, Ardaghmore (Glentop), Ardclinis, Ardclinis Mountain, Ardicoan, Ardihannon, Ardmore, Ardnaglass, Artibrannan, Artiferrall, Artiforty (Shanaghy), Artigoran, Artiloman, Artimacormick, Artlone, Artnacrea, Artnagross, Artnagullian, Artresnahan, Aughaboy, Aughalish, Aughareamlagh, Aughnacleagh, Aughnaholle, Aughnahoy, Aughnamullan, Aughnasillagh, Aughterclooney, Ault

== B ==
=== Balla to Ballu ===
Ballaghbeddy, Ballaghmore (Ballymoney), Ballaghmore Dunluce (aka Bushmills), Ballealy South, Ballee, Balleny, Ballindam, Ballinderry, Ballinlea Upper, Ballinloughan, Ballintoy Demesne, Ballintrae, Balloo, Ballsallagh, Ballure

=== Ballya to Ballyg ===
Ballyagan, Ballyalbanagh, Ballyallaght, Ballyarnot, Ballybeg, Ballybentragh, Ballyberidagh South, Ballybogy, Ballyboley (Ballycor), Ballyboley (Larne), Ballybollen, Ballyboylands Upper, Ballybrack, Ballybracken, Ballybraddin, Ballybrakes, Ballybregagh, Ballycairn, Ballycalket, Ballycarrickmaddy, Ballycarry, Ballyclan, Ballyclare, Ballyclaverty, Ballycleagh, Ballyclogh, Ballycloghan, Ballyclogh (Centre), Ballyclogh (North Centre), Ballyclogh (South Centre), Ballyclosh, Ballycollin, Ballyconagan, Ballyconnelly, Ballycoos, Ballycor, Ballycormick, Ballycowan, Ballycraig Upper, Ballycraigy, Ballycregagh, Ballycregagh Upper, Ballycreggy, Ballycronan More, Ballycullo, Ballycushan, Ballydivity, Ballydonaghy, Ballydonnelly, Ballydown, Ballydownfine, Ballyduff, Ballydugennan, Ballydunmaul, Ballydurnian, Ballyearl, Ballyeaston, Ballyedward, Ballyellough, Ballyfad, Ballyfinaghy, Ballyfore, Ballygallagh, Ballygalley, Ballygammon, Ballygan Upper, Ballygarvey, Ballygawn, Ballygelly, Ballygilbert, Ballygill North, Ballyginniff, Ballygobbin, Ballygolan, Ballygortgarve, Ballygowan, Ballygrooby

=== Ballyh to Ballym ===
Ballyhackett, Ballyhamage, Ballyhampton, Ballyharry, Ballyhartfield, Ballyharvey Upper, Ballyhemlin, Ballyhenry, Ballyhibistock Upper, Ballyhill, Ballyhill Upper, Ballyhome, Ballyhone, Ballyhowne, Ballyhunsley South, Ballyhutherland, Ballykeel, Ballykelly, Ballykennedy, Ballykenver, Ballyknock Little, Ballylacky, Ballylagan, Ballyleckan, Ballylenully, Ballylesson, Ballylig, Ballyligpatrick, Ballylinney, Ballyloran, Ballylough, Ballyloughan, Ballylough More, Ballylumford, Ballylummin, Ballylurgan, Ballymacaldrack, Ballymacdoe, Ballymacfin, Ballymacilhoyle, Ballymacilrany, Ballymacilroy, Ballymaclose, Ballymacmary, Ballymaconnelly, Ballymacoss, Ballymacrea, Ballymacrea Upper, Ballymacrevan, Ballymacricket, Ballymacward Upper, Ballymagarry, Ballymarlagh, Ballymartin, Ballymather Upper, Ballymatoskerty, Ballymave, Ballymena, Ballymena Little, Ballyminstra, Ballyminymore, Ballymoney, Ballymoneymore, Ballymontenagh, Ballymote, Ballymoy, Ballymuckvea, Ballymuldrogh, Ballymullan, Ballymullock, Ballymurphy

=== Ballyn to Ballyw ===
Ballynabarnish, Ballynacaird, Ballynacooley, Ballynacoy, Ballynacraigy, Ballynacree Beg, Ballynacree Skein, Ballynadolly, Ballynadrentagh, Ballynafeigh, Ballynafey, Ballynafie, Ballynagabog, Ballynagard, Ballynagarvy, Ballynagashel, Ballynageeragh, Ballynaghten, Ballynaglogh, Ballynagor, Ballynahaville, Ballynalargy, Ballynaleney, Ballynaloob, Ballynalough, Ballynalougher, Ballynamaddy, Ballynamenagh North or Cummingstown, Ballynamoney, Ballynamullan, Ballynanaghten, Ballynarry, Ballynarry Lower, Ballynarry Upper, Ballynashee, Ballynastraid, Ballynoe, Ballynulto, Ballyoglagh, Ballypalady, Ballypatrick, Ballypitmave, Ballypollard, Ballyportery South, Ballyprior More, Ballyquillin, Ballyratahan Upper, Ballyreagh, Ballyreagh Upper, Ballyrickard More, Ballyrobin, Ballyrock Scotch, Ballyruther, Ballyryland, Ballysavage, Ballyscolly, Ballyscullion East, Ballysculty, Ballysessy, Ballyshanaghill, Ballysillan Upper, Ballysnod, Ballystrudder, Ballytaggart, Ballytaylor, Ballyteerim, Ballytober, Ballytober West, Ballytresna, Ballytromery, Ballytunn, Ballytweedy, Ballyutoag, Ballyvaddy, Ballyvallagh, Ballyvanen, Ballyvaston, Ballyveely, Ballyveely Upper, Ballyvelligan, Ballyvennaght, Ballyvernstown, Ballyvesey, Ballyvollen, Ballyvolly, Ballyvorally, Ballyvoy, Ballywatermoy, Ballywattick Middle, Ballywatt Leggs, Ballywee, Ballyweeny, Ballywillin, Ballywindelland Lower, Ballywindelland Upper, Ballywonard, Ballywoodock

=== Bar to Bu ===
Baraghilly, Barard, Barmeen, Barnish, Bay, Beaghs, Beardiville, Beerhill, Bellaghy, Bellair, Bellee, Bellisk or Waterford, Bellisle, Beltoy, Bendooragh, Bentra, Benvardin, Bighouse, Billy or Curramoney, Birch Hill, Blackcave North, Blackcave South, Black Hill, Black Mountain, Bleerick, Boatinghole Rock, Boltnaconnell, Bonamargy, Boneyclassagh, Bootown, Bottom, Bovolcan, Boydstown, Brackenhill, Bracknamuckley, Brackney, Brae, Braetown, Bravallen, Brecart, Breckagh, Breen, Brettens Walls, British, Brockaghs, Brockish, Broom-beg, Broom-more, Broughanlea, Broughanore, Broughdone, Broughgammon, Broughmore, Broughshane Upper, Browndod, Bruslee, Bryantang, Buckna, Budore, Bunshanacloney, Burnquarter, Burnside, Bush, Bushfoot or Lissanduff, Bushmills (also known as Ballaghmore (Dunluce), Bushmills (also known as Magheraboy),

== C ==
=== Cab to Carn ===
Cabragh, Cabragh or Cavanmore, Caddy, Caherty, Caldanagh, Calhame, Calheme, Callisnagh, Capanagh, Cape Castle, Carclunty, Cardonaghy, Carey Mill, Cargan, Cargin, Cargin Island, Carlane, Carmacmoin, Carmagrim, Carmavy, Carmorn, Carnaff, Carnagall, Carnageeragh, Carnaghliss, Carnaghts, Carnahagh, Carnalbanagh, Carnamaddy, Carnamenagh, Carnanee, Carnanreagh, Carnany Lower, Carnany Upper, Carnasheeran, Carnave, Carn-beg, Carnbore, Carnbrock, Carnbuck, Carncoagh, Carncoggy, Carncolp, Carncome, Carncullagh Middle, Carnduff, Carneal, Carnearney, Carneatly, Carney Hill, Carnfeogue, Carnfinton, Carnfunnock, Carnglass More, Carngranny, Carniny, Carnkeeran, Carnkilly Upper, Carnkirk, Carnkirn, Carnlea, Carnlelis, Carnlougherin, Carnlough North, Carnlough South, Carnmoney, Carnmoney Bog, Carnmoney Glebe, Carnmoon, Carnmore, Carnsampson, Carnside, Carnspindle, Carnstroan, Carntall

=== Carr to Clyt ===
Carracloghy, Carravinally, Carravindoon, Carrickarade Island, Carrickfergus, Carricknafurd, Carricknagarrowna, Carrivcashel, Carrive, Carrivemurphy Mountain, Carrivereagh, Carrowcloghan, Carrowcowan, Carrowcrin, Carrowcroey, Carrowlaverty, Carrowreagh, Carrowreagh Mountain, Carryduff, Casheltown, Cashlan, Castlecat, Castlegore, Castle Island, Castlenagree, Castle Park, Castlequarter, Castletown, Caulside, Cavan, Cavanmore or Cabragh, Chathamhall, Churchfield, Church Quarter, Church Tamlaght, Clady, Clare, Clare Mountain, Clatteryknowes, Claughey, Cleggan, Clegnagh, Clementshill, Clinty, Cloghan, Cloghanduff, Cloghanmurry, Cloghcor, Cloghcorr, Clogher, Clogher Anderson, Clogher North, Clogher South, Cloghfin, Cloghgaldanagh, Cloghglass, Cloghglass or Retreat, Cloghinarney, Clogh Mills, Cloghogue, Cloghs, Cloghy West, Clonboy, Clonetrace, Cloney, Clonkeen, Clonreagh, Clontyfinnan West, Clooney, Cloonty, Cloughorr, Cluntirriff, Clyttaghan

=== Cog to Cu ===
Coggrey, Coldagh, Colebreene Lower, Colebreene Upper, Collinward, Commons, Connor, Conogher, Coolaveely, Coole, Coolkeeran, Coolkenny, Coolmaghra, Coolnagoppoge, Coolranny, Coolsythe, Corbally, Corkermain, Corkey Middle, Corkey North, Corkey South, Corlane, Cormorant Rock, Correen, Corrstown, Corrymellagh, Corvally, Coshkib, Cow Island, Cozies, Craig, Craigaboney, Craigahulliar, Craigalappan, Craiganboy, Craiganee, Craigarogan, Craigatempin, Craigban, Craigdunloof, Craigfad, Craigfaddock, Craiginorne, Craigmacagan, Craigmore, Craignagat, Craignageeragh, Craignamaddy, Craigs, Craigy Hall, Craigywarren, Cranfield, Crankill, Crawfordsland, Creagh, Crebilly, Creenagh, Creevamoy, Creeve, Creevery, Cregcattan & part of Galdanagh, Creggan, Cregganboy, Crevilly-valley, Crew, Crew Park, Croaghbeg, Croaghmore, Croghfern, Cromaghs, Cromkill, Cromy and Taggarts Land, Crookedstone, Crooknahaya, Cross, Crosshill, County Antrim, Crosshill, Crosskennan, Crossmary, Crossreagh, Crosstagherty, Crushybracken, Cubbindall, Culbane, Culbidag, Culbrim Lower, Culcrum, Culdoo Lower, Cullybackey, Culmore, Culnafay, Culramoney, Cummingstown or Ballynamenagh North, Curragh, Curramoney, Curramoney or Billy, Curran and Drumaliss, Currysheskin, Cushendall, Cushendun, Cushenilt, Cushleake Mountain North

== D ==
Dairyland, Deepstown, Deerfin, Deer Park, Deer Park & Little, Deer Park Farms, Deffrick, Demesne, Demesne Upper, Dernaveagh, Derryaghy, Derryclone, Derrygowan, Derryhirk, Derryhollagh, Derrykeighan, Derrykillultagh, Derrymore, Derrynaseer, Derrynisk, Dervock, Desertderrin, Devil's Churn, Dickey's Town, Dira or Upper Broghindrummin, Dirraw, Diskirt, Divis, Doagh, Dobbsland, Donegore, Dooey, Doonan, Doonans, Doonbought, Doonfin, Doory, Douglas, Douglasland, Dowgry, Downkillybegs, Drains, Drains Bog, Dreen, Droagh, Dromain, Dromore, Drumack, Drumacullin, Drumadried, Drumaduan, Drumagorgan, Drumagrove, Drumahaman, Drumaheglis, Drumahiskey, Drumahitt, Drumakeely, Drumaleet, Drumanaway, Drumanduff, Drumankelly, Drumaqueran, Drumard, Drumaridly, Drumaroan, Drumavaddy, Drumavoley, Drumawillin, Drumbare, Drumboe, Drumcon, Drumcrottagh, Drumcrow, Drumcudree, Drumcullen, Drumderg, Drumeeny, Drumfane, Drumfin, Drumfresky, Drumgurland, Drumkeeran, Drumlee, Drummaul, Drumnacross, Drumnacur, Drumadarragh, Drumbest, Drumdallagh, Druminagh, Drumleckney, Drummans, Drummuck, Drumnacole, Drumnacross, Drumnacur, Drumnadonaghy, Drumnadreagh, Drumnadrough, Drumnafivey, Drumnagee, Drumnagessan, Drumnaglea, Drumnagreagh, Drumnaheigh, Drumnahoe, Drumnakeel, Drumnamallaght, Drumnasmear, Drumnasole, Drumourne, Drumramer, Drumrankin, Drumraw, Drumraymond, Drumreagh, Drumroan, Drumsill, Drumskea, Drumsough, Drunkendult East, Duck Island, Dunadry, Dunaghy, Dunaird, Dunamoy, Dunamuggy, Dunanney, Dunarragan, Dunaverney, Duncansland, Duncarbit, Dunclug, Dundermot, Dundesert, Dundonald, Dundressan, Dundrod, Duneany, Dungall, Dungonnell, Dungorbery, Dunloy, Dunluce, Dunmakelter, Dunmall, Dunminning, Dunmurry, Dunnygarran, Dunnyvadden, Dunouragan, Dunseverick alias Feigh, Dunsilly, Dunteige, Dunturky, Durham's Land

== E ==
Eagle Hill or Ouna, Eagry, East Park, East Torr, Eden, Edenturcher, Edenvale, Eglish, Elephant Rock, Elginny, Ellanabough, Enagh Lower, Englishtown, Eshery, Eskylane, Essan, Evishacrow, Evishnablay

== F ==
Fallinerlea, Fallowvee, Falmacbreed, Falmacrilly, Falnaglass, Falrusklin, Farlough, Farranacushog, Farranalessary, Farranmacallan, Farranmacarter, Farranshane, Faughil, Feehogue, Feigh alias Dunseverick, Feigh Carrick, Feigh Mountain, Fenagh, Fenaghy, Ferguson's Land, Fernagh, Fernisky, Feumore, Finkiltagh, Fifty Acres, Five Acres, Flower Hill, Foriff, Forthill, Fort Town, Four Score Acre, Freemanstown, Friary, Frosses

== G ==
Galboly Lower, Galboly Mountain North, Galboly Mountain South, Galboly Upper, Galdanagh, Galgorm Parks, Gallagh, Gallanagh, Gally Hill, Ganaby, Garriffgeery, Garryduff, Garry Lower, Gartford, Gartree, Garvaghy, Gillistown, Glasmullen, Glassaneeran Lower, Glebe, Glenaan, Glenariff Mountain Upper East, Glenafiff Mountain Upper West, Glenariff Mountain Lower, Glenarm Demesne, Glenavy, Glenbuck, Glengad, Glengormley, Glenhead, Glenhugh, Glenleslie, Glenlough, Glenmakeeran, Glenmanus, Glenmullion, Glenocum, Glore, Glenstaghy, Glenstall, Glentask, Glentop or Ardaghmore, Glenville or Leamore, Glenwhirry, Gloonan, Glynn, Gobrana, Goodland, Gortaclee, Gortagharn, Gortaghragan, Gortahar, Gortaheran, Gortamaddy or White Hall, Gortateea, Gortcarney, Gortconny, Gortereghy, Gortfad, Gortgarn, Gortgill, Gortgole, Gortin, Gortlane, Gortmillish, Gortnacapple, Gortnacor, Gortnacor Lower, Gortnagallon, Gortnageeragh, Gortnagory, Gortnagross Middle, Gortnee, Gortrany, Gowkstown alias Ault, Gracehill, Granagh, Grange of Ballyrobert, Grange of Ballywalter, Grange of Carmavy, Grange of Inispollan Mountain, Grange of Mallusk, Grange of Umgall, Grange Park, Gransha, Great Deer Park, Greenaghan, Greenan, Greenhill, Green Island, Greenland, Greenshields Lower, Greenville, Groggan, Gruig

== H ==
Halftown, Half Umry, Hannahstown, Harphall, Harvey's Rock, Headwood, Heagles, Highlandtown, Hightown, Holestone, Holy Well, Horse Carrick, Hungry Hall, Hurtletoot

== I ==
Iderown, Illannaleck Island, Inisloughlin, Inshamph, Inshinagh, Inver, Irish Hill, Irishomerbane, Irishtown, Irragh, Islandahoe, Islandbane, Islandboy, Island Carragh North, Island Kelly, Island Macallan, Islandlean, Islandmore, Islandnabracky, Islandoo, Islandreagh, Islandrose, Islands of Carnmoon, Islandstown, Isle of Muck, Issbawn or Upper Gortnagross

== J ==
Jockeysquarter, John Gillins, Jordanstown

== K ==
Kebble, Kells, Kernyhill, Kettlebottom Island, Kilbegs, Kilbride, Kilcoan Beg, Kilcoobin, Kilcorig, Kilcreeny, Kilcreg, Kilcroagh, Kilcross, Kilcurry, Kildowney, Kildrum, Kilgad, Kilgavanagh, Kilgreel, Kilknock, Killane, Killealy, Killeaton, Killins North, Killough, Killoughag, Killycarn, Killycoogan, Killycowan, Killycreen, Killydonnelly, Killyfad, Killyfast, Killyflugh, Killygarn, Killyglen, Killygore, Killylaes, Killylane, Killyless, Killymaddy, Killyramer, Killyree, Kilmahamogue, Kilmakee, Kilmandil, Kilmore, Kilmoyle, Kilmoyangey, Kilmoyle Upper or Kirkmoyle, Kilnacolpagh, Kilnadore, Kilpatrick, Kilraghts, Kilrobert, Kilroot, Kilvillis, Kinbally, Kinflea, Kingarriff, Kingsbog, Kinkeel, Kinnegalliagh, Kinramer North, Kinune, Kirkhill, Kirkinriola, Kirkmoyle or Kilmoyle Upper, Knockacully, Knockaholet, Knockanavery, Knockanboy, Knockans, Knockans North, Knockanully, Knockavallan, Knockavrinnan, Knockboy, Knockbrack, Knockcairn, Knockeny, Knockertotan, Knockmacolusky, Knocknacarry, Knocknacrow, Knocknadona, Knocknagarvan, Knocknagulliagh, Knocknahinch, Knocknarea, Knocksoghey

== L ==
Ladyhill, Lagavara, Lagflugh, Lagmore, Lambeg North, Landhead, Laney, Langarve, Largy, Largymore, Lavin Lower, Layd, Lealies, Leamore or Glenville, Leck, Leeke, Legacurry, Legagrane, Legaloy, Legatirriff, Legg, Legnagooly, Legoniel, Leitrim Lemnagh Beg, Lemnalary, Lemnalary Mountain, Lenagh, Leymore, Libbert East, Ligadaughtan, Limavallaghan, Liminary, Limnaharry, Linford, Lisbellanagroagh Beg, Lisboy, Lisbreen, Liscolman, Lisconnan, Lisglass, Lisheegan, Lislaban, Lislagan Lower, Lislunnan, Lismacloskey, Lismenary, Lismorrity, Lismurnaghan, Lisnabilla, Lisnabraugh, Lisnacrogher, Lisnafillon, Lisnagarran, Lisnagarvy, Lisnagat, Lisnagaver, Lisnagreggan, Lisnagunogue Lower, Lisnahay North, Lisnahilt, Lisnahunshin, Lisnalinchy, Lisnamanny, Lisnamurrikin, Lisnarick, Lisnasoo, Lisnataylor, Lisnawhiggel, Lisnevanagh, Lisnisk, Lisrodden, Lissanduff or Bushfoot, Lisserluss, Lissue or Teraghafeeva, Little Deer Park, Livery Lower, Loan, Lockstown, Longfield, Long Gilbert, Longmore, Longtown, Loonburn, Losset, Loughan, Loughconnelly, Loughduff, Loughermore, Loughhill, Loughloughan, Loughlynch, Loughmagarry, Loughrelisk, Love's Corkey, Lower Broghindrummin or Tavnaghranny, Lower Tullykittagh, Lowtown, Lubitavish, Lurgansemanus, Lurganteneil, Lurganure, Lurgan West, Lurgill

== M ==
Macfinn Lower, Macfinn Upper, Maddykeel Lower, Maghaberry, Magherabeg, Magheraboy, Magheraboy or Bushmills, Magheraboy Lower, Magheracashel, Magheracross, Magheragall, Magherahoney, Magheralane, Magheralave, Magheraliskmisk, Magheramenagh, Magheramesk, Magheramore, Magheramully, Magheramurphy, Maghereagh, Maghereeroy, Magherindonnel, Magherintendry, Maghernahar, Mallendober, Malone Upper, Manister, Manola Wood, Martinstown, Maxwells Walls, Mazes, McVickersland, Meadow Parks, Middle Gortnagross, Middle Park, Midge Island, Mill Five Acres, Millquarter, Mill Tenement, Minnis North, Minnis South, Mistyburn, Moboy, Monaghan, Monanclogh, Moneybroom, Moneycanon, Moneycrumog, Moneydollog, Moneyduff, Moneyglass, Moneygobbin, Moneyleck, Moneyneagh, Moneynick, Moneyrod, Moneyvart, Monkstown, Montiaghs, Moordyke, Moore Lodge, Moss-Side (Kilbride parish), Moss-Side (Grange of Drumtullagh parish), Mostragee, Mount Edwards, Mount Hamilton, Mount Shalgus, Moyadam, Moyarget Lower, Moyasset, Moyaver Lower, Moycraig Macallister, Moygarriff, Moylarg, Moylinny, Moyrusk, Muckamore, Muckleramer, Muckrim, Mullaghboy, Mullaghbui, Mullaghcarton, Mullaghconnelly, Mullaghdoo, Mullaghduff, Mullaghduff Big, Mullaghgaun, Mullaghglass, Mullaghmossan, Mullaghsandall, Mullans, Mullarts, Mullinaskeagh, Mullindress, Mullinsallagh, Munie North, Murroo or Gortnagross Lower

== N ==
Nappan Mountain, Nappan North, Nappan South, New Buildings or Maddydoo Lower, New Buildings North, New Buildings South, Newhill, Newlands, New Park, Newtown, Niblock, Novally

== O ==
Old Church, Old Forge, Old Freehold, Oldstone, Oldtown, Old Warren, Ouna or Eagle Hill, Outal, Outhill, Owencloghy, Owensland

== P ==
Pans Rock, Parishagh, Park, Park Hall, Park & East, Park & Middle, Park & New, Park & West, Parkmore (also known as Aganlane), Pharis, Poleglass, Polintamny, Pollee, Poobles, Portlee, Portmore, Portmuck, Portrush, Potterswalls, Priestland East, Procklis, Prolusk, Prospect

== Q ==
Quarter Lenagh, Quolie

== R ==
Racavan, Rams Island, Ranaghan, Rananagh, Randalstown, Randox, Rashee, Rathbeg, Rathenraw, Rathkeel, Rathkenny, Rathmore, Rathsherry, Red Bay, Redhall, Retreat or Cloughglass, Revallagh North, Rickamore, Risk, Rooghan, Roonivoolin, Rory's Glen, Rosedermot, Roseyards, Rosnashane, Ross, Rushey Hill

== S ==
Saint Cunning, Sallagh, Savagh, Scaryhill, Scolboa, Scotchomerbane, Seacash, Seacon Beg, Seacon More, Sea Gull Isle, Semicock, Seneirl, Shaneoguestown, Shanes, Shane's Castle, Shane's Castle Park, Shaninish, Sharvogues, Sheegy Island, Sheep Island, Shellfield, Shelton North, Sheriff's Land, Shillanavogy, Skady Tower, Skeagh, Sker Beg, Sker More, Skerry East, Skerrywhirry, Skilganaban, Slaght, Slane, Slate House, Sleans, Slievebane, Slievenacloy, Slievenagh, Slievenaghy, Slievenagravery, Smallquarter, Solar, South Island Ean, Spring Farm, Spring Mount, Stackaboy, Stackahorlin, Stackaniska, Stacknacally, Stacknaderginan, Staffordstown, Stanalane, Steedstown, Steeple, Stiles, Stony Hill, Straid, Straidballymorris, Straidbilly, Straidhavern, Straidnahanna, Stranocum, Strawpark, Stroan, Stroan Lower, Swan Island

== T ==
Taggarts Land and Cromy, Taghey, Tamlaght, Tamlaghtmore, Tamnaderry, Tamnaghmore, Tamnyvane, Tamybuck, Tanderagee, Tannaghmore, Tardree, Tate's Fort, Tavnaghan, Tavnagharry, Tavnaghboy, Tavnaghdrissagh, Tavnaghmore, Tavnaghoney, Tavnaghowen, Tavnaghranny or Lower Broghindrummin, Tawnybrack, Taylorstown, Teeshan, Tehorny, Templastragh, Templecormac, Temple-effin, Templepatrick, Tenaghs, Teraghafeeva or Lissue, Terrygowan, Tervillin, The Bull, The Green Beds, The Skerries, Ticloy, Tildarg, Timpan, Tirgracey, Tirkilly, Tiscallen, Toberagnee, Toberbilly, Toberdoney, Toberdornan, Toberdowney, Tobergill, Toberkeagh, Tobernagola, Tobernaveen, Toberwine, Tom of the Tae-End, Tonagh, Tonduff, Toome, Topp Lower, Torcorr, Torglass, Tornabodagh, Tornagrough, Tornamoney, Tornaroan, Tornaroy, Torr & East, Torr & West, Townend, Town Parks, Tromra, Trummery, Tuftarney, Tullaghans, Tullaghbane, Tullaghbeg, Tullaghgarley, Tullaghgore, Tullaghore, Tully, Tullyballydonnell, Tullybane, Tullymore, Tullynahinnion, Tullynamullan, Tullyrusk, Turfahun, Turnagrove, Turraloskin, Two Acres and Half

== U ==
Unshinagh Mountain, Upper Broghindrummin (Dira)

== W ==
Warren, West Division, Whappstown, Whiteabbey, White Hall (Gortamaddy), Whitehead, White House, White Mountain, White Park

== See also ==
- List of civil parishes of County Antrim
