= Finvoy =

Hamlet in County Antrim, Northern Ireland

Coordinates: 55°1′N 6°30′W

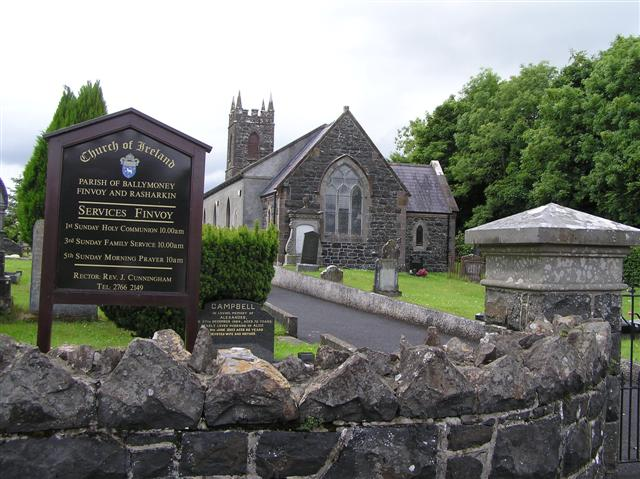
- Finvoy Church of Ireland

- Location within Northern Ireland
- Country: Northern Ireland
- Sovereign state: United Kingdom
- Police: Northern Ireland
- Fire: Northern Ireland
- Ambulance: Northern Ireland

Finvoy is a hamlet and civil parish in County Antrim, Northern Ireland. It is situated in the historic barony of Kilconway. The hamlet had a population of 187 people (52 households) in the 2011 Census.

The name derives from the Irish: An Fhionnbhoith (the white hut, church or monastic cell).

== Civil parish of Finvoy ==
The parish is bounded by County Londonderry and the civil parishes of Ballymoney, Killraghts, Killagan and Rasharkin

=== Townlands ===
It contains the following 33 townlands:

=== A ===
Artiforty or Shanaghy, Artiloman, Artnagross

=== B ===
Ballaghbeddy, Ballymacaldrack, Ballynagarvy, Ballytunn

=== C ===
Caldanagh, Carney Hill, Carrowreagh, Craigs

=== D ===
Desertderrin, Dirraw, Drumlee, Dunloy, Eden

=== G ===
Glebe, Glengad

=== K ===
Killins North, Killymaddy, Knockans

=== L ===
Lisheegan

=== M ===
Maddykeel Lower, Manola Wood, Moneycanon, Moore Lodge, Mullans

=== N ===
New Buildings or Maddydoo Lower

=== R ===
Rosnashane, Rushey Hill

=== S ===
Slievenaghy

=== T ===
Tate's Fort, Tullaghans

== See also ==
- List of civil parishes of County Antrim
- List of towns and villages in Northern Ireland
