= Artibrannan =

Coordinates: 54°53′06″N 6°19′11″W

- Location within Northern Ireland
- County: County Antrim
- Country: Northern Ireland
- Sovereign state: United Kingdom
- Police: Northern Ireland
- Fire: Northern Ireland
- Ambulance: Northern Ireland

Artibrannan is a townland in County Antrim, Northern Ireland, near Ballymena. It is situated in the historic barony of Toome Lower and the civil parishes of Ahoghill (by 1851) and Craigs (by 1891) and covers an area of 112 acres.

The name derives from the Irish: Ard tigh(e) Branain (height (or hill) of Branans) or Ard-tighe-Breannain (the height of Brennan's house).

The population of the townland decreased during the 19th century:

Year	1841	1851	1861	1871	1881	1891
Population	76	99	75	84	58	47
Houses	13	18	15	14	13	9

== See also ==
- List of townlands in County Antrim
