= Cromkill =

- Civil parish: Connor
- County: Antrim
- Country: Northern Ireland
- Sovereign state: United Kingdom
- Police: Northern Ireland
- Fire: Northern Ireland
- Ambulance: Northern Ireland

Cromkill (from Irish Crom Choill, meaning 'the sloping wood') is a townland in County Antrim, just south of Ballymena. It borders Ballee to the north, Slaght to the west, and Ballycowan to the east.

The townland first appeared in a taxation letter of 1605 under the name 'Ballycronekill', with the form 'Cromkill' first appearing in 1669. The oldest surviving buildings in the townland are a collection of houses on the Cockhill Road, which date from circa 1830. Cromkill is recorded in the 1911 census of Ireland as having 294 residents, mostly Presbyterian.
