= List of civil parishes of County Antrim =

In Ireland Counties are divided into civil parishes and parishes are further divided into townlands. The following is a list of civil parishes in County Antrim, Northern Ireland:

== A ==
Aghagallon, Aghalee, Ahoghill, Antrim, Ardclinis, Armoy

== B ==
Ballinderry, Ballintoy, Ballyclug, Ballycor, Ballylinny, Ballymartin, Ballymoney, Ballynure, Ballyrashane, Ballyscullion, Ballywillin, Billy, Blaris, Braid

== C ==
Camlin, Carncastle, Carnmoney, Carrickfergus or St. Nicholas', Connor, Craigs, Cranfield, Culfeightrin

== D ==
Derriaghy, Derrykeighan, Donegore, Drumbeg, Drummaul, Dunaghy, Duneane, Dunluce

== F ==
Finvoy

== G ==
Glenavy, Glenwhirry, Glynn, Grange of Doagh, Grange of Drumtullagh, Grange of Dundermot, Grange of Inispollan, Grange of Killyglen, Grange of Layd, Grange of Muckamore, Grange of Nilteen, Grange of Scullion, Grange of Shilvodan

== I ==
Inver, Island Magee

== K ==
Kilbride, Kildollagh, Killagan, Killead, Kilraghts, Kilroot, Kilwaughter, Kirkinriola

== L ==
Lambeg, Larne, Layd, Loughguile

== M ==
Magheragall, Magheramesk

== N ==
Newtown Crommelin

== P ==
Portglenone

== R ==
Racavan, Raloo, Ramoan, Rasharkin, Rashee, Rathlin Island

== S ==
Shankill, Skerry

== T ==
Templecorran, Templepatrick, Tickmacrevan, Tullyrusk

== See also ==
- List of townlands in County Antrim
