= Ballycor, County Antrim =

Ballycor
- County: County Antrim
- Country: Northern Ireland
- Sovereign state: United Kingdom
- Police: Northern Ireland
- Fire: Northern Ireland
- Ambulance: Northern Ireland

Ballycor is a townland (of 600 acres) and civil parish in County Antrim, Northern Ireland. Both are in the historic barony of Antrim Upper.

Sometimes spelt 'Ballycorr', it lies approx 1½-2 miles along the Ballycor road from the market town of Ballyclare, squeezed between Ballyeaston and Ballynure. There was at one time a church which is now gone and only the uneven ground gives a clue to where the church walls once stood. The graveyard also has been trampled by farm animals. According to Ordnance Survey Memoirs of County Antrim (Vol 32), around the early 1800s, there was no place in all the island of Ireland where the Scottish language was more strongly spoken than in Ballycor.

== Civil parish of Ballycor ==
The civil parish contains the following townlands: Ballyabanagh, Ballyboley, Ballycor, Ballyeaston and Killylane.

== See also ==
- List of townlands of County Antrim
- List of civil parishes of County Antrim
