= White Mountain, County Antrim =

- County: County Antrim
- Country: Northern Ireland
- Sovereign state: United Kingdom
- Police: Northern Ireland
- Fire: Northern Ireland
- Ambulance: Northern Ireland

White Mountain is a townland of 484 acres in County Antrim, Northern Ireland, 14.5 km south-west of Belfast. It is situated in the civil parish of Derriaghy and the historic barony of Massereene Upper.

The townland is named from White Mountain, a 250m high hill, on which there were extensive limestone quarries.

== See also ==
- List of townlands in County Antrim
- List of places in County Antrim
