= Solar, County Antrim =

Townland in County Antrim, Northern Ireland

Coordinates: 54.894°N 5.879°W

Solar
- Location within Northern Ireland
- District: Mid and East Antrim
- County: County Antrim
- Country: Northern Ireland
- Sovereign state: United Kingdom
- Post town: LARNE
- Postcode district: BT40
- Dialling code: 028
- Police: Northern Ireland
- Fire: Northern Ireland
- Ambulance: Northern Ireland

Solar (from Irish Saileachar, meaning 'willow-tree place') is a townland of 42 acres in County Antrim, Northern Ireland. It is on the Antrim coast, 7 miles (11 km) north-west of Larne, in the civil parish of Carncastle and the historic barony of Glenarm Upper.

== Archaeology ==
The sites of a church and graveyard in the townland are registered as Scheduled Historic Monuments at grid ref: D3440 1220 and an Early Christian cemetery was excavated in 1993. This revealed over 120 burials dated from the 7th to 12th centuries. Some burials had been disturbed by a stone-lined pit of Anglo-Norman date.

== See also ==
- List of townlands in County Antrim
- List of places in County Antrim
