= Altigarron =

Coordinates: 54.6182°N 6.0253°W

- Location within Northern Ireland
- County: County Antrim
- Country: Northern Ireland
- Sovereign state: United Kingdom
- Police: Northern Ireland
- Fire: Northern Ireland
- Ambulance: Northern Ireland

Altigarron is a townland in County Antrim, Northern Ireland. It is situated in the historic barony of Belfast Upper and the civil parish of Shankill and covers an area of 694 acres

The name derives from the Irish: Alt a Gharrain (glen of the copse).

The population of the townland decreased during the 19th century:

Year	1841	1851	1861	1871	1881	1891
Population	35	34	31	28	25	16
Houses	7	6	5	6	4	4

== See also ==
- List of townlands in County Antrim
