= Doagh =

Village in County Antrim, Northern Ireland

Coordinates: 54.738°N 6.042°W

Doagh: Irish: Dumhach; Scots: Doach
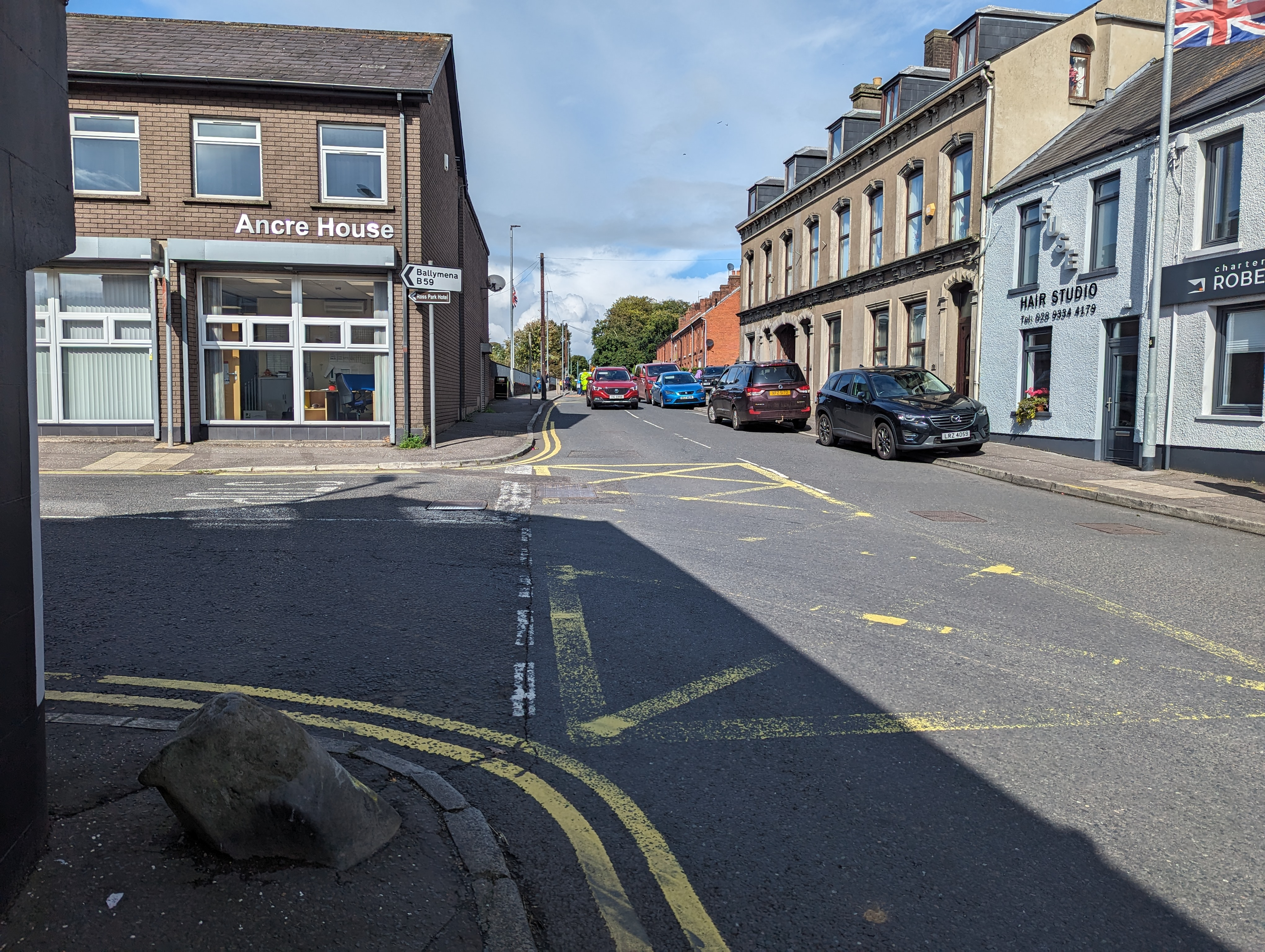
- Corner stone

- Location within Northern Ireland
- Population: 1,404 (2021 census)
  - Belfast: 11 mi (18 km)
- District: Antrim and Newtownabbey
- County: County Antrim
- Country: Northern Ireland
- Sovereign state: United Kingdom
- Post town: BALLYCLARE
- Postcode district: BT39
- Dialling code: 028
- Police: Northern Ireland
- Fire: Northern Ireland
- Ambulance: Northern Ireland
- UK Parliament: South Antrim
- NI Assembly: South Antrim

Doagh (/ˈdoʊx/ DOHKH; from Irish Dumhach, meaning 'mound') is a village and townland in County Antrim, Northern Ireland. It is in the Six Mile Water Valley, about two miles south-west of Ballyclare, and had a population of 1,404 people in the 2021 census. It is known as Doach in Scots.

While older 19th century housing stands in the village centre, the village has gradually grown and new housing estates have been built on its outskirts.

== History and built heritage ==
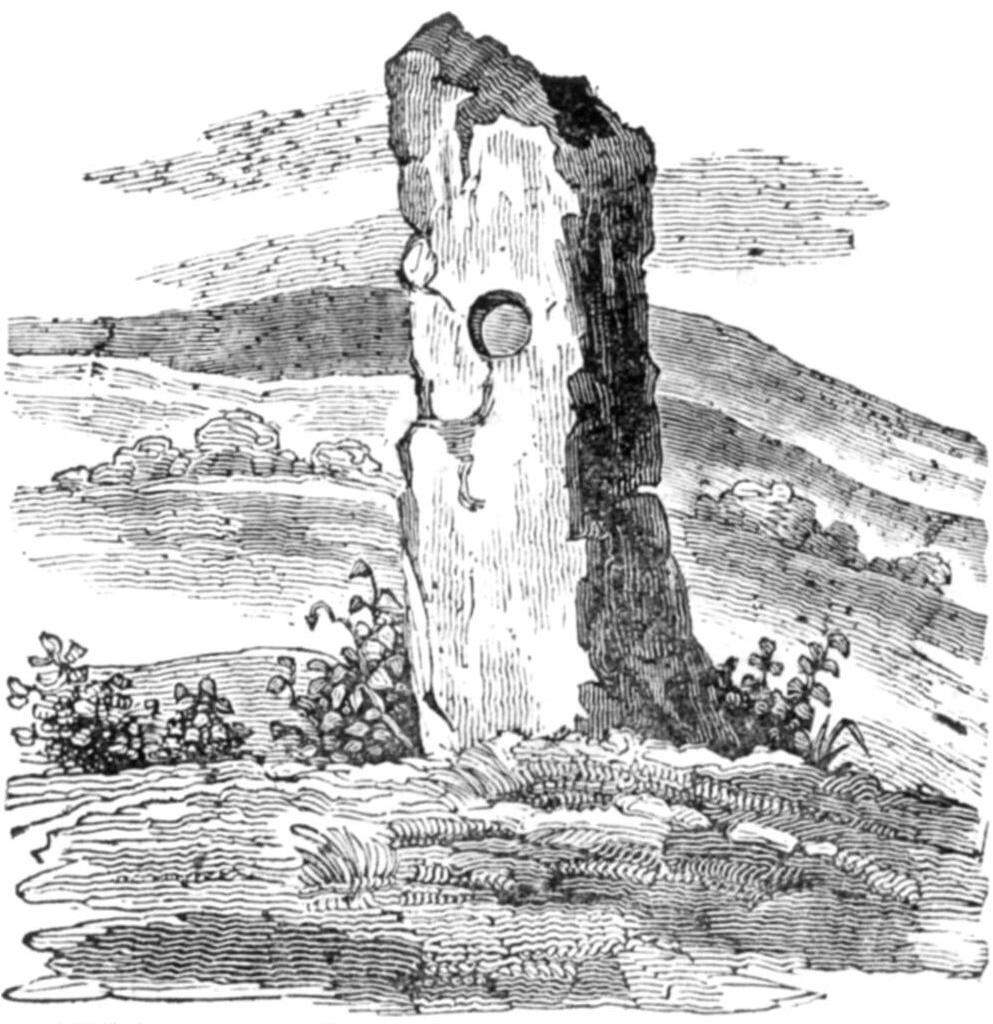
The Doagh Holestone illustrated in the Dublin Penny Journal, 1833

There is evidence of settlement in the vicinity at least from the Iron Age, and possibly the Bronze Age - as represented by the Holestone, a Bronze Age whinstone megalith known as The Holestone, and traces of numerous souterrains in the surrounding fields. Couples used to promise marriage by clasping hands through the hole in the stone, a convention that can be traced back to about 1830. W.G. Wood-Martin, writing in 1902, asserted that it was anciently "connected with aphrodisiac customs". Even today, newlyweds, together with the wedding party, will visit the stone in observance of the ancient local custom.

The remnants of a Norman motte can be found on the southern outskirts of the village at Lindsay's Corner roundabout, overlooking the Six Mile Water River.

The first Sunday school in Ireland was alleged to have been held in 1770 in Doagh on the site where the Methodist church now stands, although there is no firm evidence to support this claim. The Methodist church was established in 1844.

There are a number of buildings of architectural interest either in or proximate to the village. These include Fisherwick Lodge - a hunting lodge built for the Marquess of Donegall (1805), and Holestone House. Examples of industrial architecture include the remaining mill buildings, such as at nearby Cogry.

The nearby cemetery at Kilbride contains the 19th century Stephenson Mausoleum - a listed building modelled off the Taj Mahal - and numerous gravestones reflecting a history of emigration and war. Also in the cemetery is the headstone of William Gault, a United Irishman and founder of the aforementioned Sunday school.

== Transport ==
Doagh was formerly the terminus of a branch line of the narrow gauge Ballymena and Larne Railway. The line was extended from Ballyclare to Doagh in 1884. Passenger services between Doagh and Ballyclare were withdrawn in 1930, and freight services in 1933.

== Sport ==
Parkview Hockey Club is based in Doagh.
