= Aldfreck =

Coordinates: 54.789863°N 5.749928°W

- Location within Northern Ireland
- County: County Antrim
- Country: Northern Ireland
- Sovereign state: United Kingdom
- Police: Northern Ireland
- Fire: Northern Ireland
- Ambulance: Northern Ireland

Aldfreck is a townland in County Antrim, Northern Ireland.

The Battle of Aldfreck was fought in November 1597.

== Popular culture ==
David Hume wrote a poem about the "Aldfreck Mining Disaster".

== See also ==
- List of townlands in County Antrim
- List of places in County Antrim
