= Ballinlea Upper =

- County: County Antrim
- Country: Northern Ireland
- Sovereign state: United Kingdom
- Police: Northern Ireland
- Fire: Northern Ireland
- Ambulance: Northern Ireland

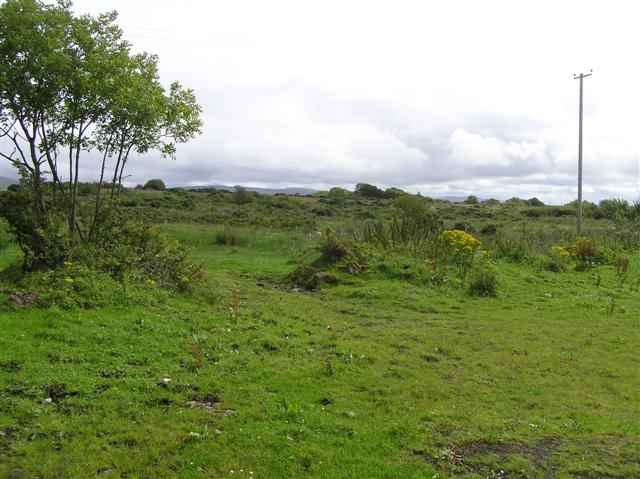
Ballinlea Upper townland in 2007

Ballinlea Upper is a townland in County Antrim, Northern Ireland, near to Straid. It is situated in the historic barony of Cary and the civil parish of Ballintoy and covers an area of 280 acres

The name derives from the Irish: Baile an Leagha (town of the physician).

The population of the townland decreased during the 19th century:

Year	1841	1851	1861	1871	1881	1891
Population	138	112	77	90	62	62
Houses	28	23	19	20	16	16

== See also ==
- List of townlands in County Antrim
