= Dunamuggy =

Townland in County Antrim, Northern Ireland

Coordinates: 54.737°N 6.108°W

Dunamuggy: Irish: Dún na mBogach
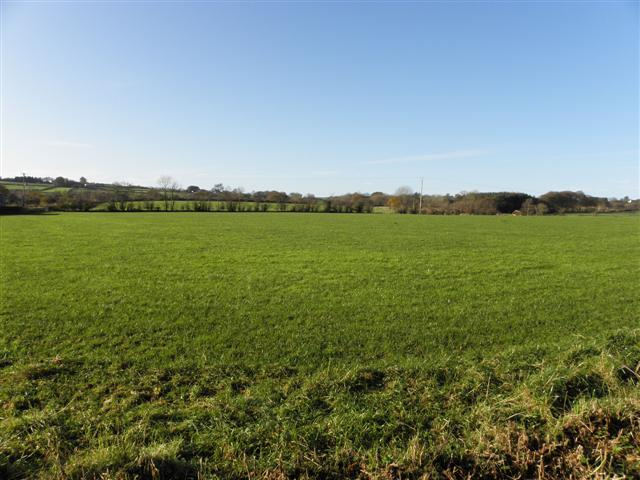
- Dunamuggy townland in 2009

- Location within Northern Ireland
  - Belfast: 12 mi (19 km)
- District: Antrim and Newtownabbey
- County: County Antrim
- Country: Northern Ireland
- Sovereign state: United Kingdom
- Post town: BALLYCLARE
- Postcode district: BT39
- Dialling code: 028
- Police: Northern Ireland
- Fire: Northern Ireland
- Ambulance: Northern Ireland
- UK Parliament: South Antrim
- NI Assembly: South Antrim

Dunamuggy (from Irish Dún na mBogach, meaning 'fort of the bogs or marshes') is a townland of 172 acres in County Antrim, Northern Ireland. 4 miles (6 km) east of Antrim town centre, it is in the civil parish of Donegore and the historic barony of Antrim Upper.

== Archaeology ==
The name probably comes from a motte in the east of the townland. The Ordnance Survey Memoir of 1838 records a tumulus 18 ft high, outside of which was a parapet varying in height from 2 to 6 ft. The mound seemed to be constructed of stone and covered with earth. The motte is a Scheduled Historic Monument at grid ref: J2274 9059.

== See also ==
- List of townlands in County Antrim
- List of places in County Antrim
