= White Hall, Northern Ireland =

- County: County Antrim
- Country: Northern Ireland
- Sovereign state: United Kingdom
- Police: Northern Ireland
- Fire: Northern Ireland
- Ambulance: Northern Ireland

White Hall, Northern Ireland or Gortamaddy is a townland in County Antrim, Northern Ireland.

== See also ==
- List of townlands in County Antrim
- List of places in County Antrim
