= West Division (Northern Ireland) =

- County: County Antrim
- Country: Northern Ireland
- Sovereign state: United Kingdom
- Police: Northern Ireland
- Fire: Northern Ireland
- Ambulance: Northern Ireland

West Division is a townland of 6,739 acres in County Antrim, Northern Ireland. It is situated in the civil parish of Carrickfergus and the historic barony of Carrickfergus.

== See also ==
- List of townlands in County Antrim
- List of places in County Antrim
