= Ballygill North =

Coordinates: 55°18′27″N 6°14′06″W

- Location within Northern Ireland
- County: County Antrim
- Country: Northern Ireland
- Sovereign state: United Kingdom
- Police: Northern Ireland
- Fire: Northern Ireland
- Ambulance: Northern Ireland

Townlands of Rathlin Island

Ballygill North is a townland in County Antrim, Northern Ireland. It is located in the northwestern part of Rathlin Island and has an area of 149 acres (60 ha). It contains Skerriagh, the northernmost point of Northern Ireland.

== See also ==
- List of townlands in County Antrim
- List of places in County Antrim
