= Layd =

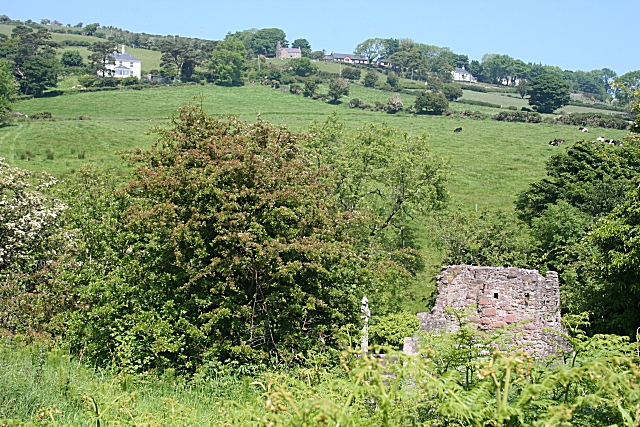
- Ruins of Layd church and the slopes of Cross Slieve
- County: County Antrim
- Country: Northern Ireland
- Sovereign state: United Kingdom
- Police: Northern Ireland
- Fire: Northern Ireland
- Ambulance: Northern Ireland

Layd (Irish: Leithead) is a civil parish and townland (of 219 acres) in County Antrim, Northern Ireland. It is situated in the historic barony of Glenarm Lower.

== Civil parish of Layd ==
The civil parish contains the following villages:

- Cushendall
- Knocknacarry

== Townlands ==
The civil parish contains the following townlands:

=== A ===
Aganlane (also known as Parkmore), Aghagheigh, Agolagh, Altmore Lower, Altmore Upper

=== B ===
Ballyagan, Ballybrack, Ballyfad, Ballymacdoe, Ballynahaville, Ballynalougher, Ballyvooly, Baraghilly, Barard, Bellisk (also known as Waterford)

=== C ===
Callisnagh, Carnahagh, Carnanee, Carnasheeran, Cashlan, Clegnagh, Cloghglass (also known as Retreat), Cloghglass, Cloghs, Cloghy East, Cloghy West, Cloney, Corlane, Coshkib, Culbidag

=== D ===
Doory, Dromore, Drumcudree, Drumnacur, Drumnasmear, Dunouragan

=== E ===
Eagle Hill (also known as Ouna), Ellanabough, Eshcry

=== F ===
Fallinerlea, Falmacrilly, Falnaglass, Faughill, Foriff

=== G ===
Glasmullen, Glebe, Glenaan, Glenville (also known as Leamore), Gortaclee, Gortaghragan, Gortateean, Gortlane, Gortnagross Lower (also known as Murroo), Gortnagross Middle, Gortnagross Upper (also known as Issbawn), Gruig

=== I ===
Issbawn (also known as Upper Gortnagross)

=== K ===
Killoughag, Kilmore, Kilnadore, Knockacully, Knockans North, Knockans South, Knockeny, Knocknacarry

=== L ===
Lagflugh, Laney, Layd, Leamore (also known as Glenville), Legg, Lubitavish

=== M ===
Maghereeroy, Middle Park, Moneyvart, Mount Edwards, Mullarts, Mullinaskeagh, Murroo (also known as Gortnagross Lower)

=== O ===
Ouna (also known as Eagle Hill)

=== P ===
Parkmore (also known as Aganlane)

=== R ===
Rananagh, Red Bay, Retreat (also known as Cloghglass)

=== S ===
Savagh, Shaninish, Sleans, Straid

=== T ===
Tavnaghan, Tavnagharry, Tavnaghdrissagh, Tavnaghoney, Tavnaghowen, Timpan, Tirkilly, Toberwine, Tromra, Tully

=== U ===
Unshanagh

=== W ===
Warren, Waterford (also known as Bellisk

== Grange of Layd ==
The Grange of Layd contains the following townlands: Beaghs, Brockaghs, Carnamaddy, Clyttaghan, Dira (also known as Upper Broghindrummin), Drumfresky, Irragh, Kinune, Knocknacrow, Lower Broghindrummin (also known as Tavnaghranny), Tavnaghranny (also known as Lower Broghindrummin), Upper Broghindrummin (also known as Dira)

== Layd Church and Churchyard ==
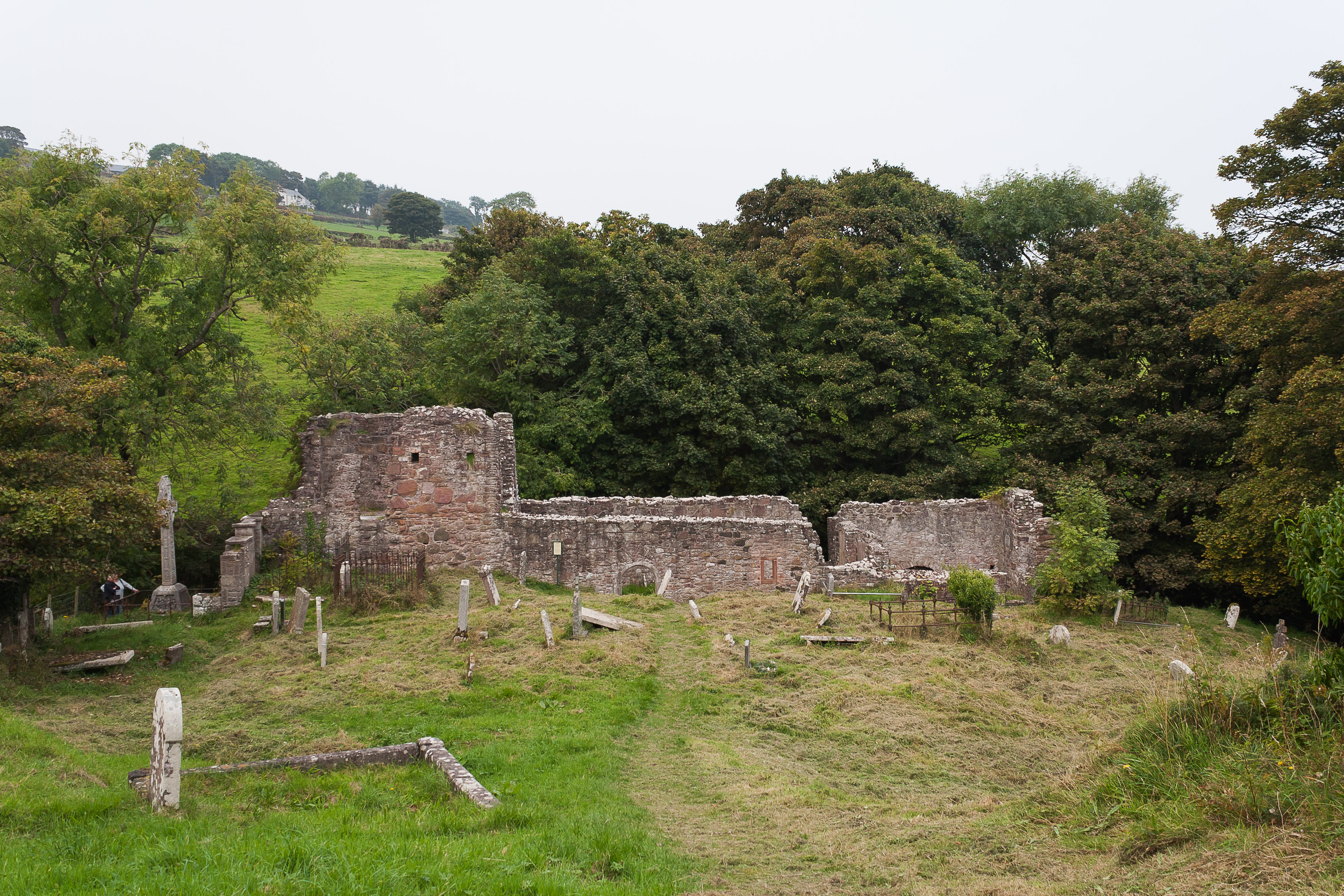
Layd Church as seen from the south

The ruins of Layd Church (grid ref:324428), a Franciscan foundation possibly partially from the 13th century, are found 1.5 km north of Cushendall. They are also accessible by a cliff path from Cushendall, as well as by road. There are old vaults in the churchyard and it was one of the main burial places of the MacDonnells. There is a stone cross memorial to Dr James MacDonnell, one of the organisers of the last Belfast Festival of Harpists in 1792 and pioneer of the use of chloroform in surgery. By the gate of the churchyard is a holestone and nearby two 'corp stones' on which coffins were rested. Layd Church saw service as a parish church from 1306 until about 1790.

== See also ==
- List of townlands in County Antrim
- List of civil parishes of County Antrim
