= Whappstown =

Whappstown: Scots: Whaupstoun
- County: County Antrim
- Country: Northern Ireland
- Sovereign state: United Kingdom
- Police: Northern Ireland
- Fire: Northern Ireland
- Ambulance: Northern Ireland

Whappstown is a townland of 634 acres in County Antrim, Northern Ireland. It is situated in the civil parish of Connor and the historic barony of Antrim Lower.

In 1669, James Whap is recorded as living in the townland of Whappstown and the townland name probably derives from his family surname. In William Petty’s c.1672 map from the Down Survey, a version of the original Irish name of the townland is found, recorded as Craginefernon (Creag an Ifearnáin - rock of the place abounding in alders). Whappstown was one of the ‘sixteen towns of Connor’: the sixteen townlands around Connor cathedral which were the property of the bishop of the diocese.

== See also ==
- List of townlands in County Antrim
- List of places in County Antrim
