= Antiville =

Townland in County Antrim, Northern Ireland

Antiville: Irish: An Tigh Bhile
- County: County Antrim
- Country: Northern Ireland
- Sovereign state: United Kingdom
- Police: Northern Ireland
- Fire: Northern Ireland
- Ambulance: Northern Ireland

Antiville (from Irish An Tigh Bhile, meaning 'The House of the Old Tree') is a townland of 165 acres in County Antrim, Northern Ireland. It is situated in the civil parish of Larne and the historic barony of Glenarm Upper.

== Archaeology ==
At Antiville, in a marshy area beside a tributary of the River Larne, a rectangular house and souterrain were discovered enclosed by a shallow ditch cut through the peat with a slight bank on the inner side. Eventually this was interpreted, not as a ringfort enclosure, but a means of draining excess water from the site. Radiocarbon dates from the supposed ringfort at Antiville were 544-644 AD and 695-936 AD.

== See also ==
- List of townlands in County Antrim
