= Araboy =

Townland in County Antrim, Northern Ireland

Coordinates: 55°12′10″N 6°26′16″W

- Townland
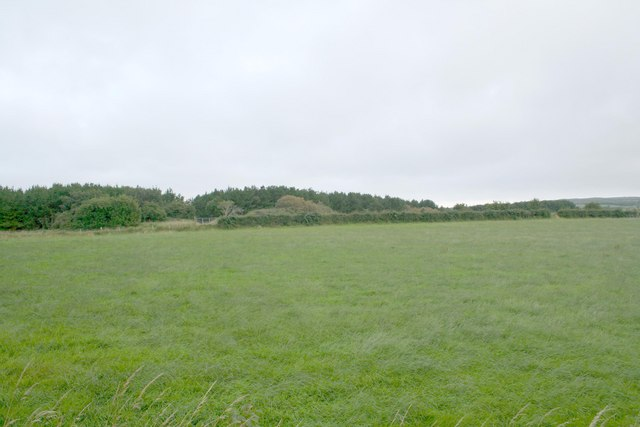
- Araboy townland in 2006

- Location within Northern Ireland
- County: County Antrim
- Country: Northern Ireland
- Sovereign state: United Kingdom
- Police: Northern Ireland
- Fire: Northern Ireland
- Ambulance: Northern Ireland

Araboy is small a townland in County Antrim, Northern Ireland. It is situated in the historic barony of Cary and the civil parish of Ballintoy and covers an area of approximately 430 acres (0.67 sq mi). It is 3.5 miles (5.6 km) east of Bushmills.

The name derives from the Irish: Aradh Buidhe (yellow land) or Ard Buidhe (yellow height).

The population of the townland decreased during the 19th century:

Year	1841	1851	1861	1871	1881	1891
Population	123	110	103	104	119	81
Houses	30	23	20	22	21	18

== See also ==
- List of townlands in County Antrim
