= Tobergill =

Coordinates: 54.733°N 6.145°W

Tobergill: Irish: An Tobar Geal
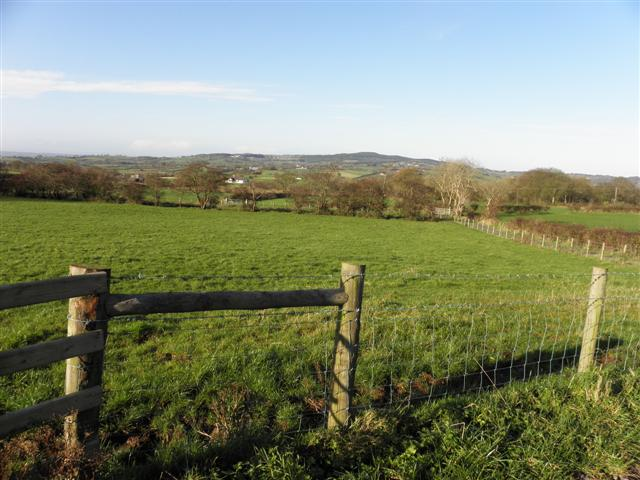
- Tobergill townland in 2009

- Location within Northern Ireland
- County: County Antrim
- Country: Northern Ireland
- Sovereign state: United Kingdom
- Police: Northern Ireland
- Fire: Northern Ireland
- Ambulance: Northern Ireland

Tobergill (from Irish An Tobar Geal, meaning 'the bright or white well') is a townland of 1,044 acres in County Antrim, Northern Ireland. Lying on the western aspect of Donegore hill, it is situated in the civil parish of Donegore and the historic barony of Antrim Upper.

The name Tobergill is variously recorded as Tubbergeill in 1608, Turbergeile in 1621 and Tubbergill in 1669.

== Archaeology ==
There is a stone circle in Tobergall at grid ref: J208905. Only one large stone remains standing, others lie scattered around.

A souterrain with three chambers was investigated by archaeologists in 1959-60 after being uncovered by two farmers ploughing a field. It was later filled in and covered again, for the safety of livestock.

== See also ==
- List of townlands in County Antrim
- List of places in County Antrim
