= Ballyclaverty =

Townland in County Antrim, Northern Ireland

Coordinates: 54°45′04″N 6°06′14″W

Ballyclaverty: Irish: Baile Mhic Laibheartaigh
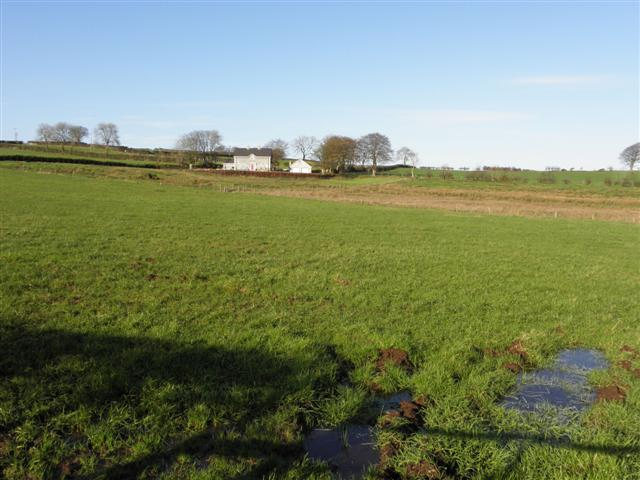
- Ballyclaverty townland in 2009

- Location within Northern Ireland
- County: County Antrim
- Country: Northern Ireland
- Sovereign state: United Kingdom
- Police: Northern Ireland
- Fire: Northern Ireland
- Ambulance: Northern Ireland

Ballyclaverty (from Irish Baile Mhic Laibheartaigh, meaning 'MacLaverty’s townland') is a townland of 339 acres in County Antrim, Northern Ireland. 5 miles (8 km) north-east of Antrim town, it is in the civil parish of Donegore and the historic barony of Antrim Upper.

There is a barrow in the townland registered as Scheduled Historic Monument at grid ref: J2279 9098.

== See also ==
- List of townlands in County Antrim
- List of places in County Antrim
