= Ballyboley =

Balleyboley may refer to:

- Ballyboley (Ballycor), a townland in County Antrim, Northern Ireland
- Ballyboley (Larne), a townland in County Antrim, Northern Ireland
- Ballyboley, County Down, a townland in County Down, Northern Ireland
