= Appletee =

Townland in County Antrim, Northern Ireland

Coordinates: 54°48′54″N 6°17′35″W

- Location within Northern Ireland
- County: County Antrim
- Country: Northern Ireland
- Sovereign state: United Kingdom
- Police: Northern Ireland
- Fire: Northern Ireland
- Ambulance: Northern Ireland

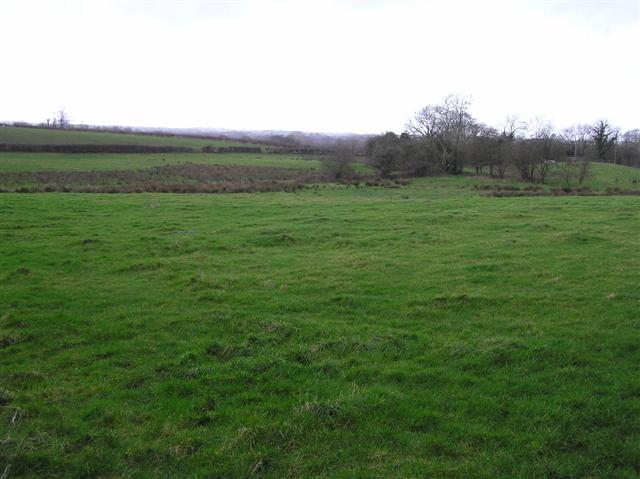
Appletee townland in 2008

Appletee is a townland in County Antrim, Northern Ireland. It is situated in the historic barony of Antrim Lower and the civil parish of Connor and covers an area of 226 acres. It is 3.4 miles (5.5 km) south of the centre of Ballymena (5 miles (8 km) by road).

The population of the townland decreased during the 19th century:

Year	1841	1851	1861	1871	1881	1891
Population	144	131	157	167	148	106
Houses	28	26	26	29	27	25

== See also ==
- List of townlands in County Antrim
