= Ballaghbeddy =

Coordinates: 55°1′27.4″N 6°33′54.2″W

Ballaghbeddy: Irish: Bealach Beadaidhe
- County: County Antrim
- Country: Northern Ireland
- Sovereign state: United Kingdom
- Police: Northern Ireland
- Fire: Northern Ireland
- Ambulance: Northern Ireland

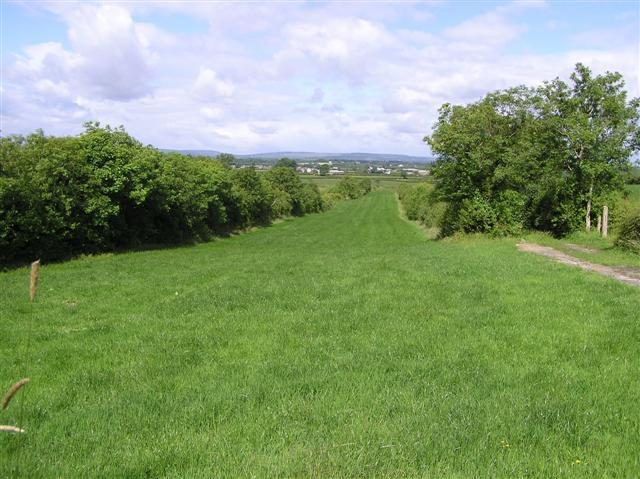
Ballaghbeddy townland in 2008

Ballaghbeddy (from Irish Bealach Beadaidhe, meaning 'road of the gourmands') is a townland of 164 acres in County Antrim, Northern Ireland, near Ballymoney. It is situated in the historic barony of Kilconway and the civil parish of Finvoy, on the eastern bank of the River Bann which forms the western boundary of the parish of Finvoy.

== 19th century population ==
The population of the townland decreased during the 19th century:

Year	1841	1851	1861	1871	1881	1891
Population	91	71	67	64	43	43
Houses	17	18	16	14	11	11

== See also ==
- List of townlands in County Antrim
