= Upper Broghindrummin =

- County: County Antrim
- Country: Northern Ireland
- Sovereign state: United Kingdom
- Police: Northern Ireland
- Fire: Northern Ireland
- Ambulance: Northern Ireland

Upper Broghindrummin (also known as Dira) is a townland of 186 acres in County Antrim, Northern Ireland. It is situated in the historic barony of Glenarm Lower and the civil parish of Layd (Grange of Layd).

== See also ==
- List of townlands in County Antrim
- List of places in County Antrim
