= Acravally =

Townland in County Antrim, Northern Ireland

Coordinates: 55.200063°N 6.210759°W

Acravally: Irish: Acra Bhile
- County: County Antrim
- Country: Northern Ireland
- Sovereign state: United Kingdom
- Police: Northern Ireland
- Fire: Northern Ireland
- Ambulance: Northern Ireland

Acravally is a townland in County Antrim, Northern Ireland. It is situated in the historic barony of Cary and the civil parish of Culfeightrin and covers an area of 31 acres.

The name derives from the Irish: Acra bhile (acre of the old tree).

The population of the townland decreased during the 19th century:

Year	1841	1851	1861	1871	1881	1891
Population	22	26	27	20	14	15
Houses	5	5	5	4	2	2

== See also ==
- List of townlands in County Antrim
