= Ballygolan =

Townland in County Antrim, Northern Ireland

Coordinates: 54°39′12.46″N 05°55′53.95″W

Ballygolan: Irish: Baile Gobhláin
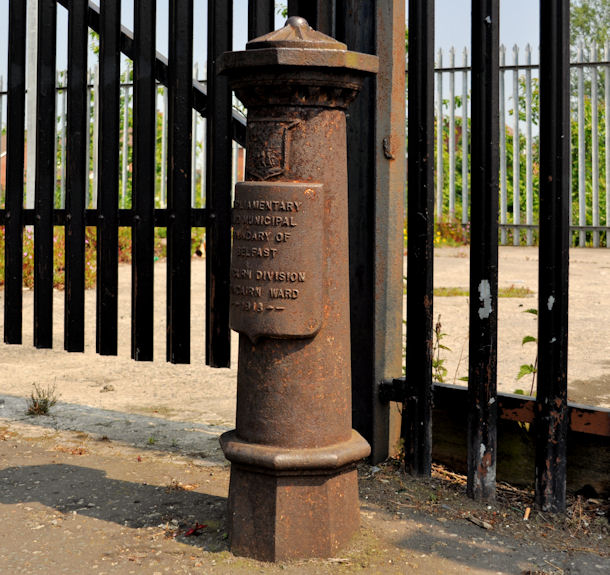
- Old boundary post, near Ballygolan

- Location within Northern Ireland
- District: Antrim and Newtownabbey
- County: County Antrim
- Country: Northern Ireland
- Sovereign state: United Kingdom
- Post town: NEWTOWNABBEY
- Postcode district: BT36, BT37
- Dialling code: 028
- Police: Northern Ireland
- Fire: Northern Ireland
- Ambulance: Northern Ireland
- UK Parliament: East Antrim
- NI Assembly: East Antrim

Ballygolan is a townland in County Antrim, Northern Ireland. It is on the northern outskirts of Belfast, by Newtownabbey.

== Education ==
- Ballygolan Primary School

== See also ==
- List of townlands of County Antrim
