= Derrymore, County Antrim =

Village in County Armagh, Northern Ireland

Coordinates: 54°32′N 6°19′W

Derrymore: Irish: Doire Mór
- Location within Northern Ireland
- Population: 243
  - Belfast: 16 mi (26 km)
  - Dublin: 82 mi (132 km)
- District: Armagh City, Banbridge and Craigavon
- County: County Armagh
- Country: Northern Ireland
- Sovereign state: United Kingdom
- Post town: CRAIGAVON
- Postcode district: BT67
- Dialling code: 028
- Police: Northern Ireland
- Fire: Northern Ireland
- Ambulance: Northern Ireland
- UK Parliament: Upper Bann
- NI Assembly: Upper Bann

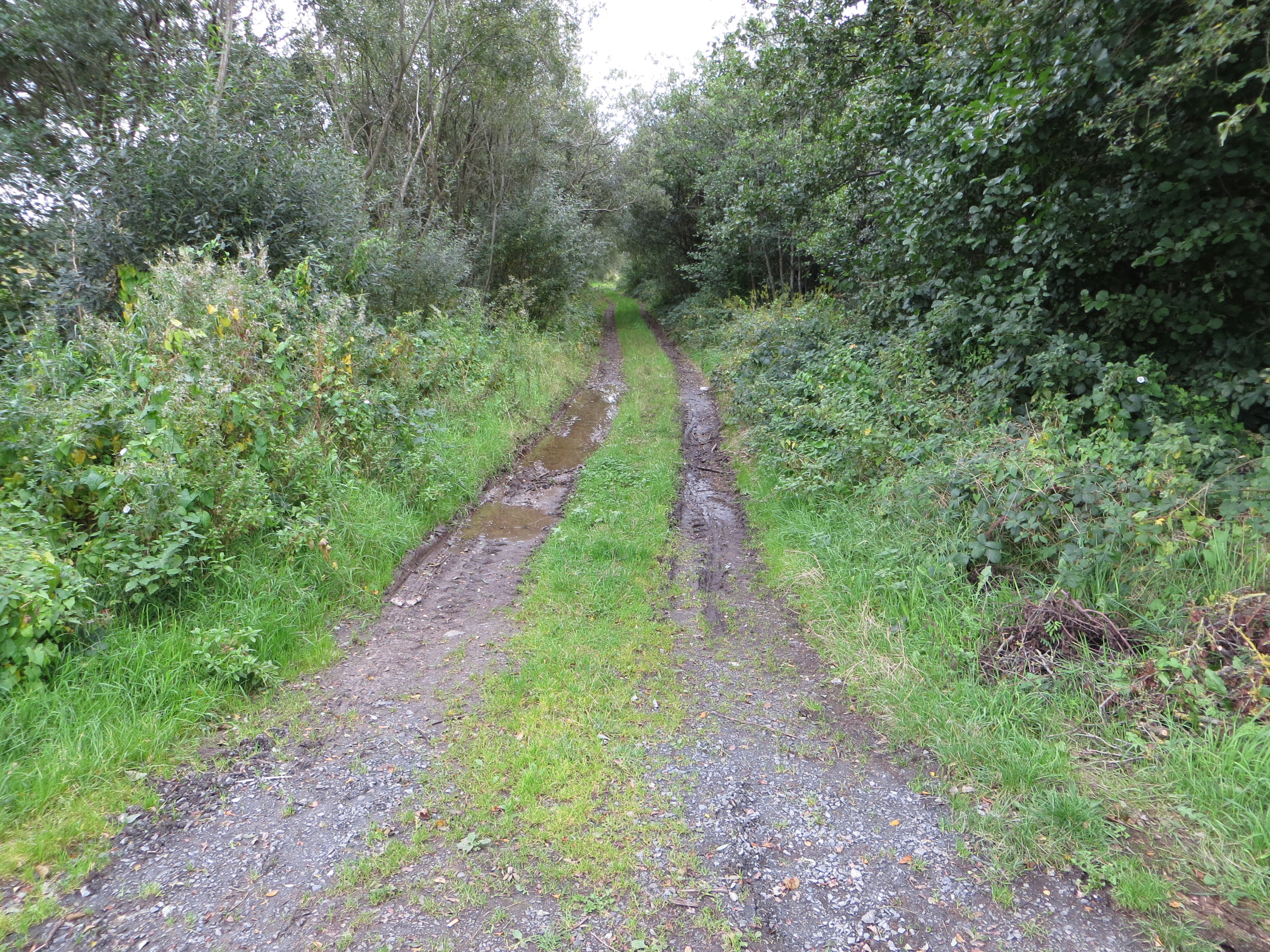
Muddy Path in the Village

Derrymore (from Irish Doire Mór 'great oak-grove') is a small village and townland in County Armagh, Northern Ireland. In the 2001 census it had a population of 243 people. It lies on the shores of Lough Neagh, within the Armagh City, Banbridge and Craigavon Borough Council area.

The village is a linear settlement comprising residential development and a primary school (St. Mary's Primary School), but no other community facilities.
