= Ballyclogh =

Ballyclogh may refer to:

- Ballyclogh, County Cork, a village in Ireland
- Townlands in County Antrim, Northern Ireland:
  - Ballyclogh, County Antrim
  - Ballyclogh (Centre)
  - Ballyclogh (North Centre)
  - Ballyclogh (South Centre)
