= Inver =

Inver refers to:

- Inver, County Donegal, village in County Donegal, Ireland
- Inver, County Mayo, village in County Mayo, Ireland
- Inver, Highland, village in the Scottish Highlands
- Inver, County Antrim, a civil parish, in County Antrim, Northern Ireland
- Inver, Irish brand of petrol stations run by Greenergy

== See also ==
- Aber and Inver (placename elements)
