= Ballylinney Presbyterian Church =

Church building in The United Kingdom

Coordinates: 54.733°N 5.993°W

Presbyterian Church in Ireland
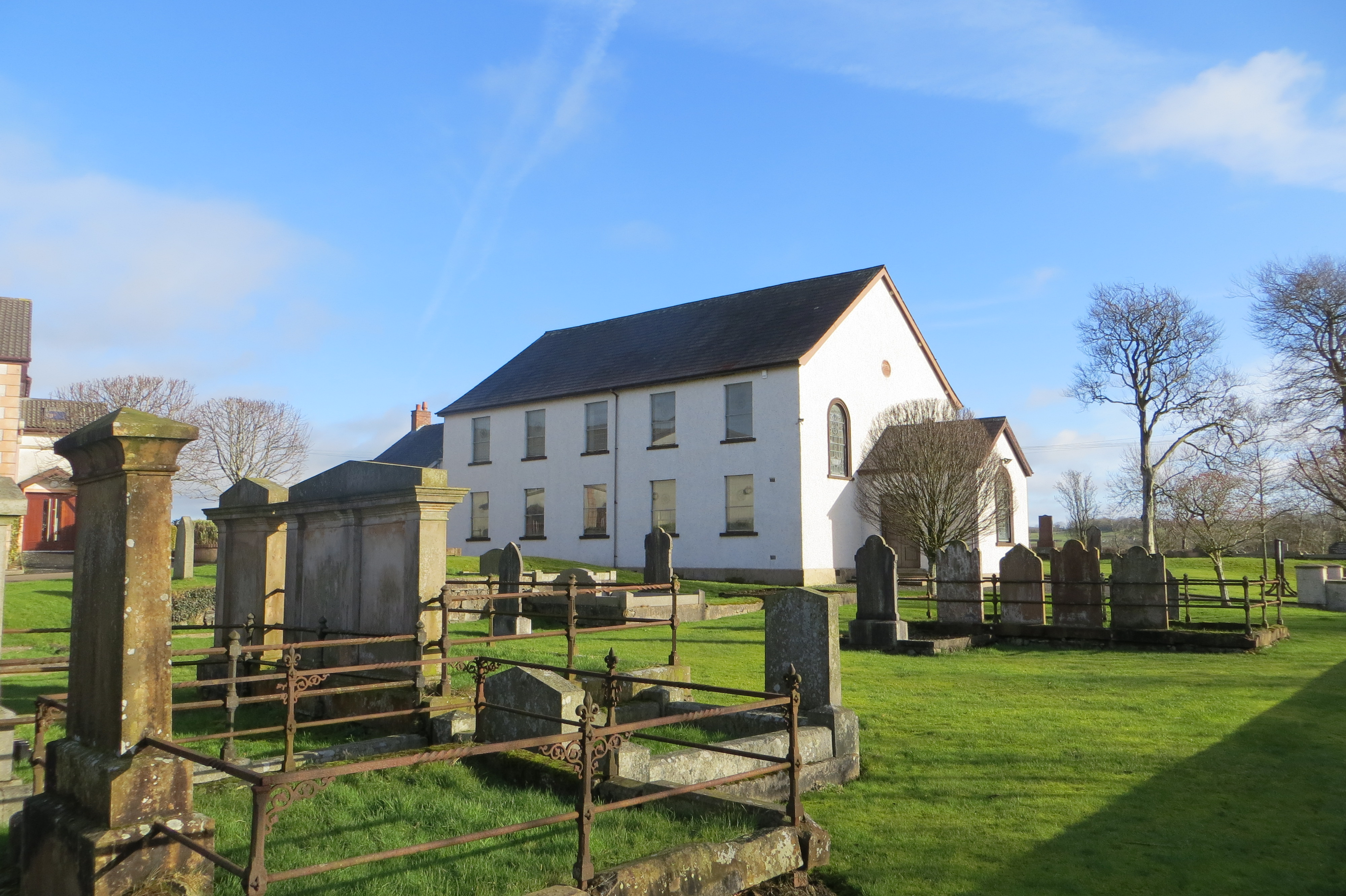
- Church and graveyard (2014)
- Classification: Protestant
- Orientation: Calvinist
- Polity: Presbyterian
- Moderator: Right Reverend Dr David Clarke
- Associations: World Alliance of Reformed Churches
- Region: Ireland
- Founder: James I
- Origin: 1610
- Branched from: Church of Scotland
- Separations: Free Presbyterian Church of Ulster (separated 1951)
- Congregations: 560

Ballylinney Presbyterian Church is a Presbyterian church in Ballylinney, County Antrim, Northern Ireland.

== History ==
The foundation stone for Ballylinney Church was laid on 6 May 1835 with the completion of the building on 11 September 1836. By the year 1840 Ballylinney Church became part of the Presbytery of Carrickfergus and by 1842 the first elders of the church were ordained.

It was only in 1883 that the church paid for the first Presbyterian Manse to be built on the Hillhead Road where the Minister, Rev Williams, would reside with his family. The house was a double story and had a large garden encircling the house. Between the years of 1923 and 1956 saw the addition of various luxuries such as the first organ and electric heating and lighting being installed. By 1966 the stables which were still on the property were then converted for the church hall and to provide both a kitchen and toilet facilities for the congregation.

In 1977 the new hall was built and named after the current minister, Rev C. F. Young, and it was by this time that the congregations Children's Church and Girls Brigade were being run from the newly built facilities. Then in 1997 additional buildings were added to the existing hall and also named after Rev C.F. Young.

These days only some of the congregation members are farmers, but by far the majority are young families where the parents commute to other areas, such as Larne, Belfast or Ballymena. At this time there are 340 homes connected to this church.

== Ministers of Ballylinney ==
- Rev. Isaac Adams 1837 - 1880
- Rev. James Foster Williams 1881 - 1899
- Rev. Hugh Craig Meeke 1899 - 1904
- Rev. John Kyle 1905 - 1911
- Rev. Wilson Moreland Kennedy 1912 - 1921
- Rev. Ernest McConnell 1921 - 1958
- Rev. Charles Frances Young 1959 - 1982
- Rev. Roy Vallely 1983 - 2009
- Rev. Emerson McDowell 2010–2023

== See also ==
- Presbyterian Church in Ireland
