= Mary Butters =

Irish witch-doctor

- Born: c.1770 Carrickfergus, County Antrim, Ireland
- Died: c.1850 Carnmoney, County Antrim, Ireland

Mary Butters (c.1770 – c.1850) was an Irish witch known as the Carnmoney witch.

== Biography ==
Mary Butters (sometimes recorded as Mary Buttles or Mary Butlers) was born in Carrickfergus, County Antrim around 1770. Carrickfergus had witnessed the infamous Islandmagee witch trial in the early 1700s. From a young age Butters practiced "white" magic, using superstitious or herbal remedies as cures for physical and other ailments. She was best known for curing cows of suspected bewitchment. Given how important cattle were to Irish agriculture at the time, fear of cows being bewitched was a common one, with a common malevolent spell believed to make it impossible to churn butter with their milk.

== Carnmoney witch ==
On a Tuesday evening in early August 1807, Butters was brought to Carnmoney, near Carrickfergus to tend to such a bewitched cow. Elizabeth Montgomery, wife of Alexander Montgomery, a tailor, believed that one of the women in Carrick Town had bewitched her cow. Butters attempted to churn some butter with the milk, but was unable to do so. Others who attempted to drink the milk vomited. She sent Alexander and a young man called Carnaghan out to the cow-house at 10pm, told then to turn their waistcoats inside out, and stand at the head of the cow until she called them. Butters stayed in the house with Elizabeth, her son David, and Margaret Lee, an elderly woman. Here she undertook some traditional cures, such as putting pins, crooked nails, and needles in a pot of sweet milk on the fire. She ordered the house be sealed, blocking all exits, so that the smoke could cleanse the house. At dawn, having heard nothing from the house, Alexander returned to investigate. He broke down the door, where he found all four people lying on the floor. Butters and Lee were breathing, but Elizabeth and David were dead. Lee died within a few minutes of discovery, but Butters recovered having been thrown on a heap of manure and Alexander repeatedly kicking her. Some other reports say that she was revived when a mob brought her to the edge of a quarry and threatened to throw her in unless she brought all three people back to life. It is said that she placated the mob by saying she would have to return to the house to perform the rite to revive the dead.

On 19 August an inquest was held by James Stewart, the coroner. He presented detailed evidence against Butters, which resulted in the jury finding that the deaths were as a result of suffocation from the sulphurous concoction Butters was cooking to sure the ailing cow. She was duly imprisoned in Carrickfergus gaol. In 1808, Butters was brought before the spring assizes, but all of the charges were dismissed by proclamation that the deaths were as a result of an unfortunate accident. Butters claimed it had been "a black man" (common name for the devil in witchcraft) who had appeared in the house and attacked them all with a large club. A detailed account of Butters, her trail and subsequent life come from The Butter Stealing Witch and the Ploughshare written by William Orr McGraw.

== Later life and legacy ==
Unusually for the time, Butters, then known as the "Carnmoney witch" did not suffer as a result of this event. A contemporary humorous ballad was written, and is thought to be the only surviving poem on Irish witchcraft. Having moved to the Carnmoney area, Butters continued to treat bewitched cows from the area. She also aided those whose horses had been stolen, concocting some form of punishment.

No sign of a Mary Butters, Buttles, or Butlers appears in the parish records of Carrickfergus or Carnmoney. There is no gravestone or marker with her name, and no birth, marriage, and death announcements appear in the Belfast News-Letter from 1800 to 1860. Neither does she appear in the Ordnance Survey memoir for Carrickfergus. A memoir of the parish of Carnmoney does record a Mary Butters living in Carrickfergus on 28 April 1839. McGraw records that Mary Butters died in Carrickfergus "at an advanced age".
