= Parkgate, County Antrim =

Village in County Antrim, Northern Ireland

Coordinates: 54.71615°N 6.10662°W

Parkgate is a small village in County Antrim, Northern Ireland. It lies at the foot of Donegore Hill, near the Six Mile Water. It is about midway between Ballyclare and Antrim town. It lies within the Borough of Antrim. It had a population of 676 people in the 2011 Census.

== Population ==
=== 2011 Census ===
In the 2011 Census Parkgate had a population of 676 people (256 households).

=== 2001 Census ===
Parkgate is classified as a small village or hamlet by the NI Statistics and Research Agency (NISRA) (i.e. with population between 500 and 1,000 people). On Census day (29 April 2001) there were 646 people living in Parkgate. Of these:

- 26.7% were aged under 16 years and 14.8% were aged 60 and over
- 50.3% of the population were male and 49.7% were female
- 4.0% were from a Catholic background and 92.4% were from a Protestant background
- 2.0% of people aged 16–74 were unemployed.

== See also ==
- List of towns and villages in Northern Ireland
