= Ballee =

Coordinates: 54.844875°N 6.277851°W

- Location within Northern Ireland
- County: County Antrim
- Country: Northern Ireland
- Sovereign state: United Kingdom
- Police: Northern Ireland
- Fire: Northern Ireland
- Ambulance: Northern Ireland

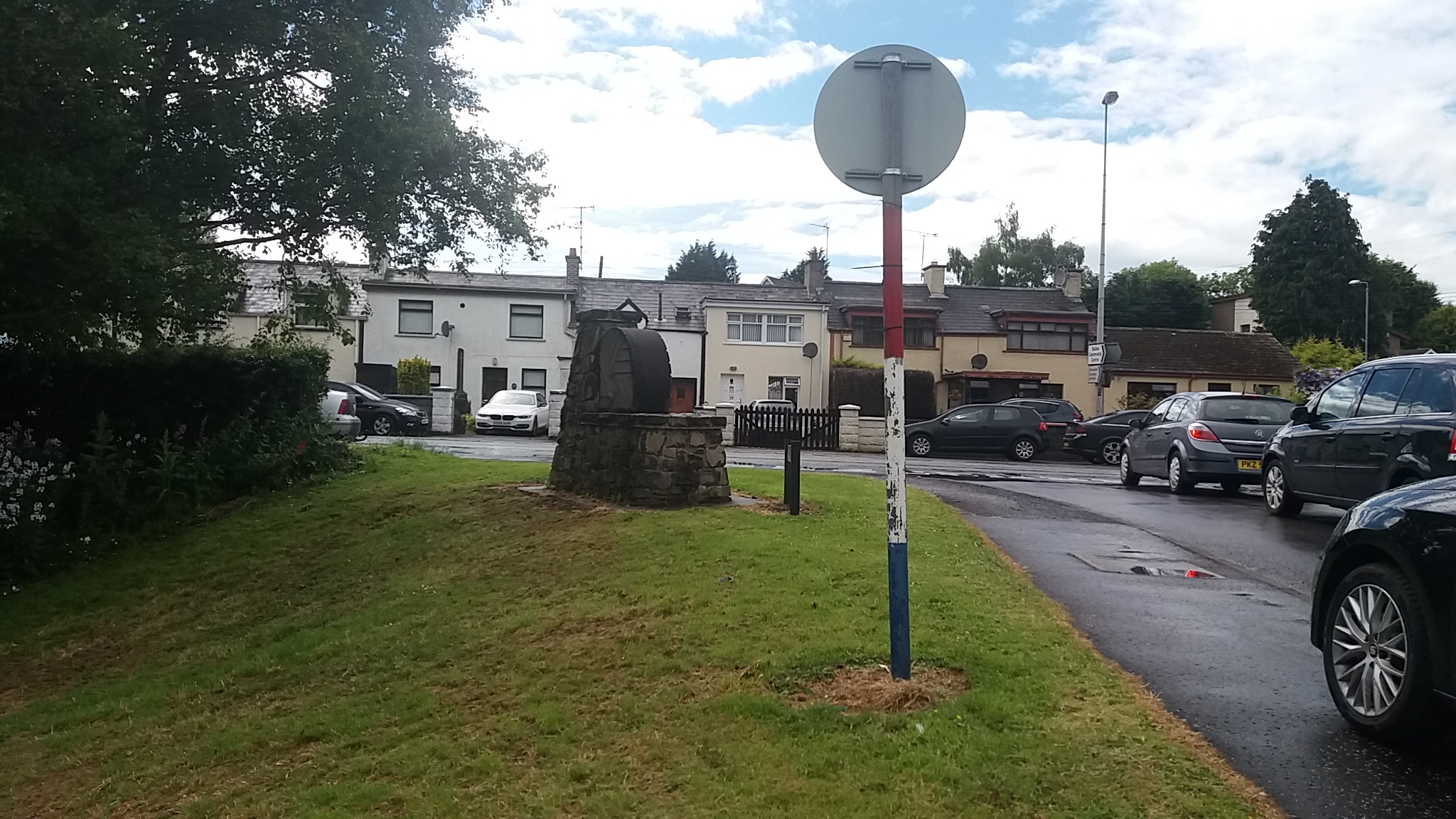
Red, White & Blue signpost at the Ballee Way to the estate.

Ballee (from Irish Baile Aodha, meaning "Hugh’s townland") is a townland, containing a large housing estate off the Antrim Road in South Ballymena, County Antrim, in Northern Ireland.

== History ==
The Ballee estate is divided into different separate estates: Drumtara to the south, Lettercreeve to the north, Shanlieve and Shancoole to the West, and Shanowen, Kincora and Lanntara to the East. Lettercreeve comprises mainly rows of two or three-storey terraced houses parallel to the street, or in the Radburn layout with some of the terraced houses not facing the street, but onto a pedestrian path, as well as some 2 storey blocks of flats. Shanlieve and Shancoole comprise distinctively-shaped buildings from single-storey Bungalows up to three storey blocks of flats. Much of the Kincora and especially Shanowen areas have been demolished in recent years, leaving green spaces behind. These areas, as well as Drumtara and Lanntara, also consist of distinctively-shaped buildings from single-storey Bungalows up to two storey houses and blocks of flats.

In 2001, Drumtara was 0-10% Catholic, while the rest of the Ballee estate was 10-20% Catholic.

== Education ==
Ballee Community High School was a state secondary school in Ballee that closed in 2014.

Camphill Primary School is now the only primary school in the townland.

== Community facilities ==
In the estate there are many grassy areas, often where houses have been demolished, a park, Ballee Primary School which closed in 2010, a public house and a few retail premises. Near the estate on the Old Antrim Road is Ballee Presbyterian Church, as well as Ballee Baptist Church, on the Toome Road in the townland, near to Ballymena Free Presbyterian Church, which is also in Ballee townland.

There is a community centre.
