= Cogry =

Village in County Antrim, Northern Ireland

Coordinates: 54°45′26″N 6°2′10″W

Cogry-Kilbride: Irish: Coigríoch – Cill Bhríde
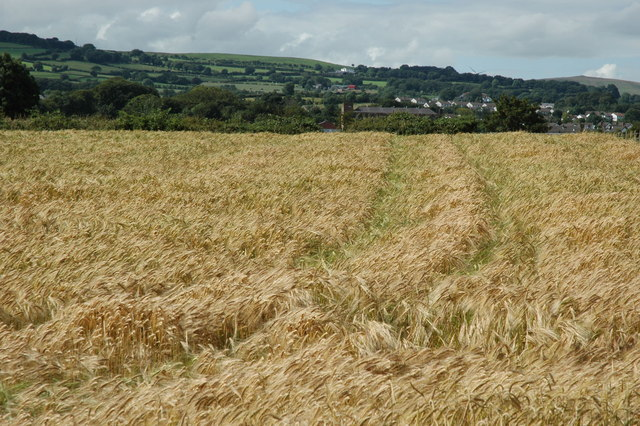
- View across the fields towards Cogry

- Location within Northern Ireland
- Country: Northern Ireland
- Sovereign state: United Kingdom
- Police: Northern Ireland
- Fire: Northern Ireland
- Ambulance: Northern Ireland

Cogry-Kilbride is a village in County Antrim, Northern Ireland, about 4 km west of Ballyclare. The village encompasses the two townlands of Cogry and Kilbride. It had a population of 1,195 people in the 2001 census. Kilbride is also a civil parish. It is situated in Antrim and Newtownabbey district.

== History ==
The names Cogry (also written as Coggrey) and Kilbride come from Irish Coigríoch, meaning 'border-land, frontier' and Cill Bhríde meaning "Bríd's church".

Cogry was originally a mill village built and owned by the McMeekin family during the mid 19th century, who also owned Cogry Mill. But it declined in the 1950s with the closure of the mill, The mill has since been purchased in 2019 by a property developer but the site currently lies dormant. In recent years the village has been revitalised by housing development. As the two settlements are so close they are often treated as one.

== Demographics ==
Cogry/Kilbride is classified as a "village" by the Northern Ireland Statistics and Research Agency (NISRA) (i.e. with population between 1,000 and 2,250 people). On census day in 2001 (29 April 2001), there were 1,195 people living in Cogry/Kilbride. Of these:

- 26.3% were aged under 16 years and 7.3% were aged 60 and over
- 50.2% of the population were male and 49.8% were female
- 1.5% were from a Catholic background and 93.7% were from a Protestant background
- 2.7% of people aged 16–74 were unemployed

== See also ==
- List of civil parishes of County Antrim
