= Portmuck =

Townland in County Antrim, Northern Ireland

Coordinates: 54.8475°N 5.7272°W

Portmuck: Irish: Port Muc
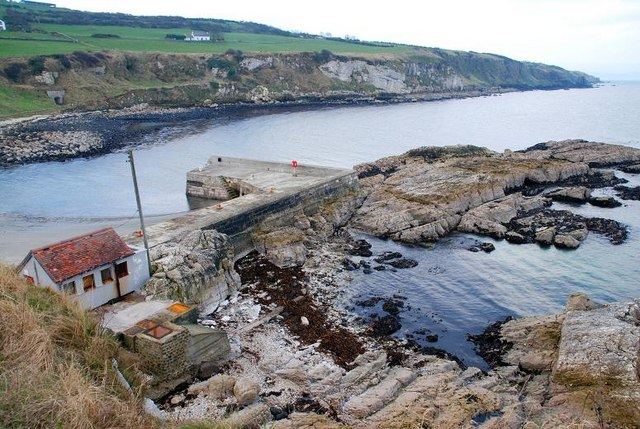
- Portmuck harbour in 2007

- Location within Northern Ireland
- County: County Antrim
- Country: Northern Ireland
- Sovereign state: United Kingdom
- Post town: LARNE
- Postcode district: BT40
- Dialling code: 028

Portmuck (from Irish Port Muc, meaning 'port/harbour of pigs') is a townland of 235 acres in County Antrim, Northern Ireland. It is situated in the civil parish of Islandmagee and the historic barony of Belfast Lower.

The townland has given its name to a little island just off the coast called Isle of Muck, which is a nature reserve.

In 2025, puffins were found to be nesting on the Isle of Muck for the first time in 25 years.

== See also ==
- List of townlands in County Antrim
