= Dunluce, County Antrim =

Dunluce
- Civil parish
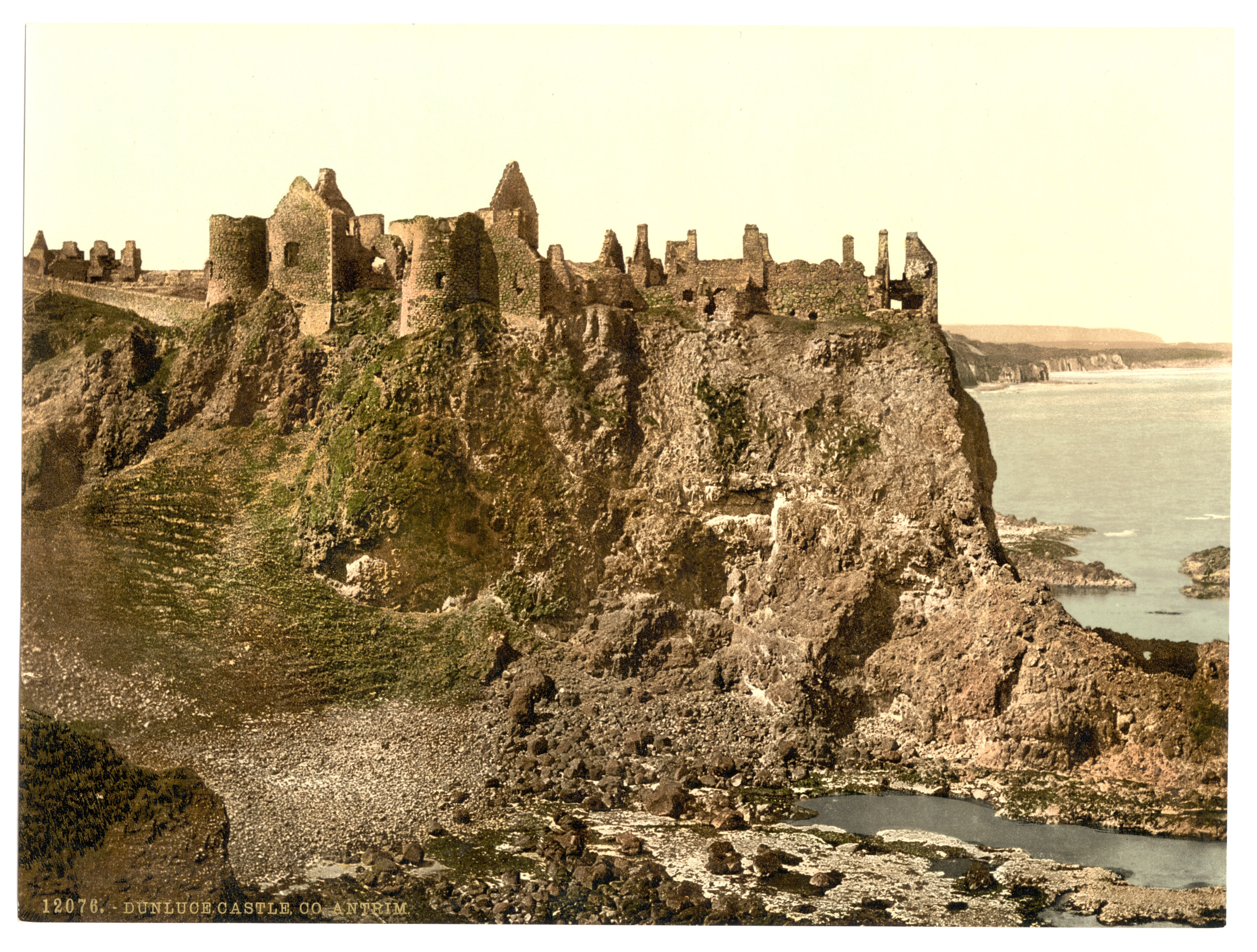
- Dunluce Castle, within Dunluce civil parish, is in a townland of the same name
- Interactive map of Dunluce
- Coordinates: 55.178°N 6.551°W
- Country: Northern Ireland
- County: County Antrim

Dunluce (Irish: Dún Libhse) is a civil parish in County Antrim, Northern Ireland. Dunluce civil parish, which contains a townland of the same name, is within the historical barony of Dunluce Lower. Villages within the civil parish include Ballybogy, Bushmills, and Portballintrae.

== See also ==
- List of civil parishes of County Antrim
