= Carnmoney =

Civil parish and townland near Belfast, Northern Ireland

Coordinates: 54.683°N 5.95°W

Carnmoney: Irish: Carn Monaidh
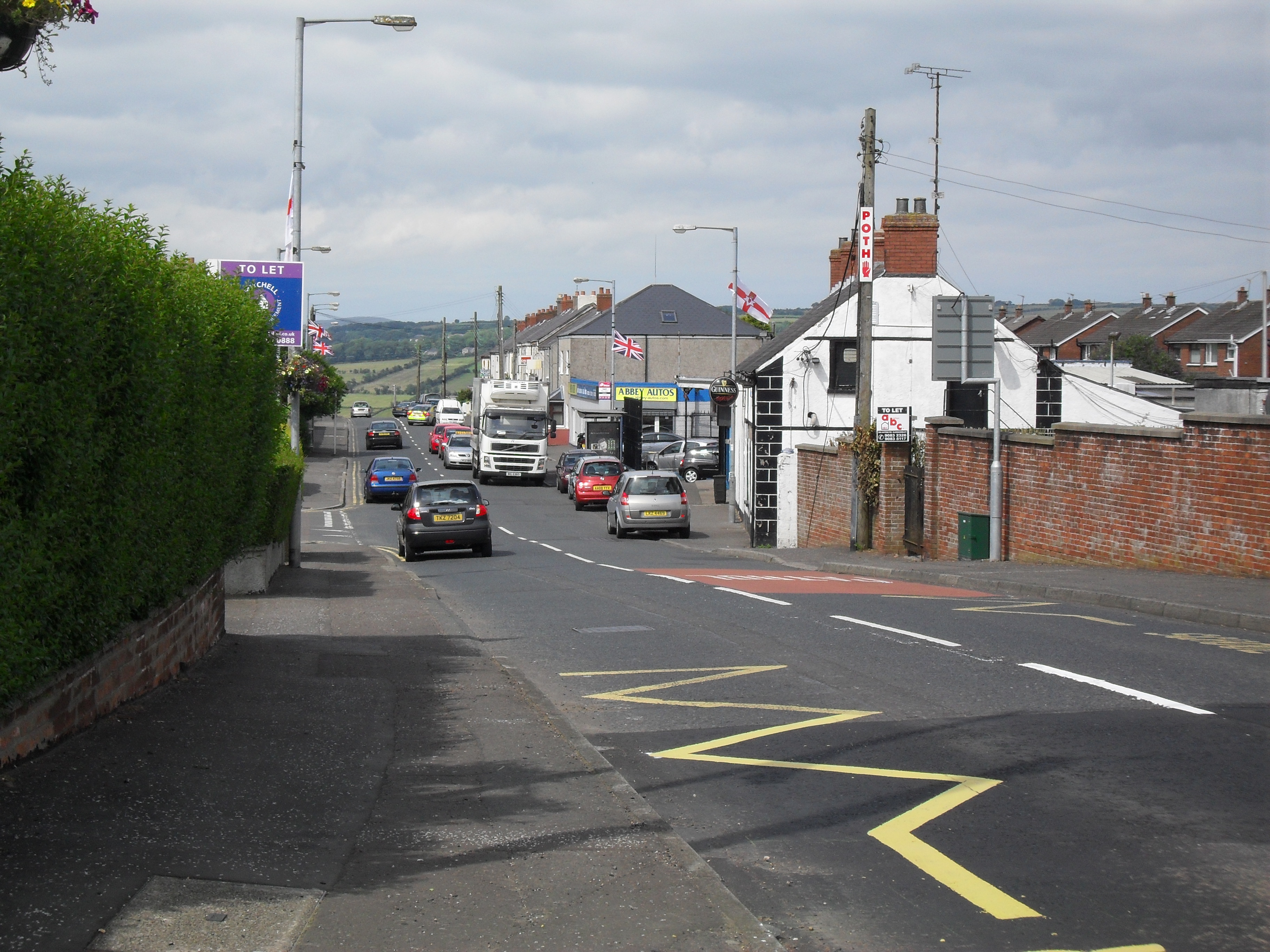
- Carnmoney Road

- Location within Northern Ireland
- Population: 2,775 (2001 census)
  - Belfast: 6.3 miles (10.1 km)
- District: Antrim and Newtownabbey
- County: County Antrim
- Country: Northern Ireland
- Sovereign state: United Kingdom
- Post town: NEWTOWNABBEY
- Postcode district: BT36
- Dialling code: 028
- UK Parliament: East Antrim
- NI Assembly: East Antrim

Carnmoney (from Irish Carn Monaidh 'cairn of the bog') is the name of a townland (of 456 acres), electoral ward and a civil parish in County Antrim, Northern Ireland. Carnmoney is within the urban area of Newtownabbey, in the Antrim and Newtownabbey Borough Council area. It lies 7 miles (11 km) from Belfast city centre in the historic barony of Belfast Lower.

Carnmoney is known throughout Belfast for its large graveyard. Carnmoney Cemetery sits on the slopes of Carnmoney Hill, a major landmark in the area, which also contains a woodland nature reserve. The poet Derek Mahon mentions Carnmoney Cemetery in his poem "My Wicked Uncle".

== History ==
Carnmoney, as a settlement, grew up around a holy well (still visible in the current Church of Ireland grounds), Glas-na-bradan river and Carnmoney Hill. The area became a Norman borough known as Coole or Le Coule, the borough was wrecked several times during subsequent English/Irish/Scots battles and nothing is left. Le Coule was on the site of the present Rathfern/Rathcoole housing estates. Bits of the Old Irish Highway, an old route from Carrick to Antrim passing through the Norman borough, are still visible running alongside the current O'Neill Road. Carnmoney as a name has come to represent Carnmoney Village (the village previously known as Ballyduff).

=== Carnmoney Presbyterian Church ===
Carnmoney Presbyterian Church is one of the oldest Presbyterian churches in Ireland as it dates from 1657. The plot where it stands was previously home to a meeting house, from 1622.

=== Mary Butters ===
Mary Butters (c.1770–c.1850), also referred to as the "Carnmoney Witch", was put on trial for murder in March 1818. She was called a "Wise-woman" in the area and had been hired by a local farmer to lift a "curse" he believed had possessed one of his cows.

The day after she had supposedly lifted the spell, the farmer, his wife and his son were found dead in their home. Butters was accused of murdering them with a "herbal potion" she had created to use on the cow. Her story was that a man appeared before them with a huge bludgeon and killed the three only stunning her. The affair was the topic of much talk in Belfast and its surrounding villages, however Butters was discharged from the Spring Assizes in Carrickfergus by proclamation.

== Education ==
There are seven schools in Carnmoney, all at primary level, run by the Education Authority.

- Ashgrove Primary School
- Carnmoney Primary School
- St Bernard's Primary School (Also run by the Council for Catholic Maintained Schools (CCMS))
- St Mary's on the Hill (Also run by the CCMS)
- St. McNissis Primary School (Also run by the CCMS)
- Mossley Primary School
- Hillcroft Special Needs School
- Earlview Primary School

== Demographics ==
The 2001 census showed Carnmoney had a population of 2,765. However, a 2008 estimate is higher due to major sub-urbanisation in Belfast.

- 18.1% were under 16 and 22.3% was over the age of 60.
- 47.5% of the population of Carnmoney were male and 52.5% were female.
- 36.7% of people were from a Catholic background and 63.3% were from a Protestant or other Christian related community.
- The average age in Carnmoney was 40 years, higher than the Newtownabbey average of 35 years and higher still than the Northern Ireland average of 35.8 years.
- The population density of Carnmoney was 33.37 persons per hectare. This is proportionality much higher than in Newtownabbey were there are 5.31 persons per hectare, and higher still than 1.19, the Northern Ireland Average.

== Land use ==
=== Carnmoney Hill ===
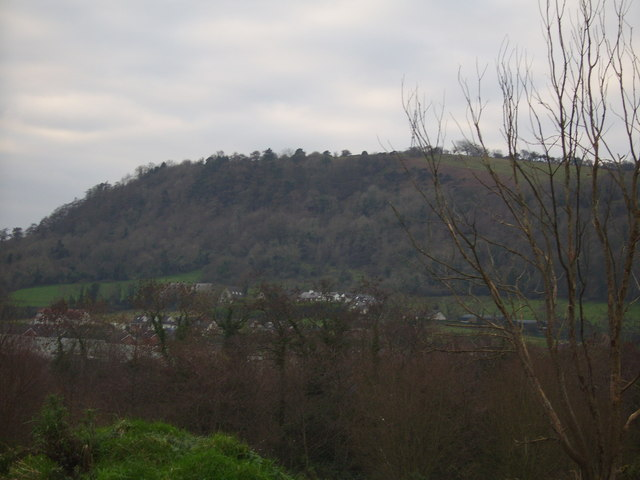
Much of Carnmoney Hill is covered by woodland.

Carnmoney Hill is a northern outlier of the Belfast Hills chain and rises 232 m (761 ft) above Newtownabbey, and thus it can be seen from northern County Down, Belfast Lough, the M2 and M5 motorways and Belfast City. The eastern side is mainly covered by ancient woodland with semi-natural grasslands and other habitats interspersed, e.g. scrubland and bracken. The hill top has a volcanic cap yet the slopes are mainly of limestone and flint, joining mudstones at the coastal belt below.

The Woodland Trust and Antrim and Newtownabbey Borough Council own most of the eastern side, a third of the hill, although the crest and western two thirds of the hill are in private ownership, including most of the cultivated, grazing and heath land. There are numerous paths through the private land (often used by the public), leading to the top however there are no permanent paths on the hill open to the public.

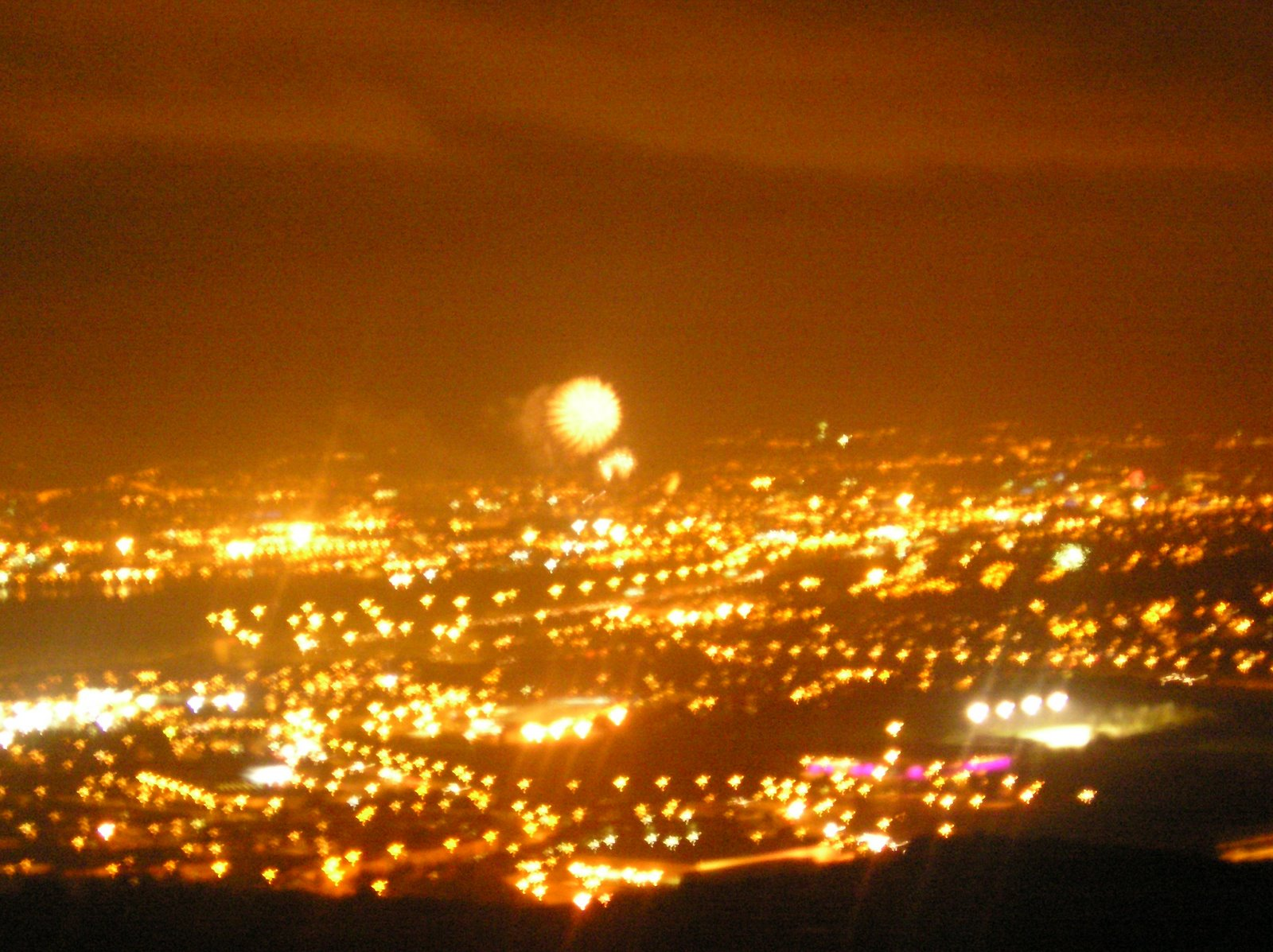
The view of Belfast by night, from Carnmoney Hill (fireworks from the New Years celebrations can clearly be seen in the skies above Belfast's SSE Arena)

Dunanney Ráth (or Fort) stands majestically overlooking Carnmoney Cemetery on the southern face of Carnmoney Hill. The ráth site, where in ancient times fairs and festivals were held, may date to Celtic times (around 500 BC). In 1556 the Earl of Sussex, Lord Deputy to Elizabeth I, camped with his troops at Dunanney where he met with Irish chieftains and tried unsuccessfully to pacify the Irish people. The name Dunanney has been translated both as 'The Fort of the Assemblies' and 'The Fort of the Watery Place' (built on rock, it tends to be wet and marshy). A second ráth exists to the east of Dunanney. Two souterrains (man-made underground passages) have been found on the hill, although more than 20 are known to have existed in the past. Dunanney Ráth is on private land and not open to the public, however the part of Carnmoney Hill owned by the Woodland Trust is just south of Dunanney and is open to the public all year round. Newtownabbey Borough Council had in recent times tried to open Dunanney Ráth with little success. Plans to open a park on the hill are also underway.

Lilian Bland built and flew her own aircraft, the first biplane built in Ireland, from here in 1910. There are a variety of habitats including floral meadows, wetland patches, shrub land, old hedgerows, copses, mixed ash woods, and semi natural woodland. The grazed lands tend not to have many wildlife species however they add to the hills landscape patchwork when seen from afar.

The hill offers good views of Belfast city, Cave Hill, Newtownabbey, Carrickfergus and Bangor. On a clear day the Mourne Mountains, Slemish Mountain and even the western coast of Scotland are easily visible.

=== Carnmoney Cemetery ===
Carnmoney cemetery is well known throughout Belfast. It is a large cemetery split into two main sections on the east and west sides of Prince Charles Way. A Cross of Sacrifice was erected in the cemetery after the First World War. There are 46 Commonwealth burials of the First World War and 44 of the Second World War here. The cemetery has been the source of much controversy in recent years. In 2006 14 graves were damaged by vandals with floral tributes and ornaments being smashed on the graves. Outrage after the event led to a rise in foot patrols in the cemetery.

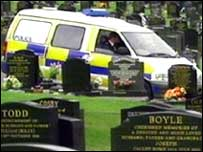
Police patrol Carnmoney cemetery before Cemetery Sunday

Newtownabbey Borough Council had previously proposed to expand the cemetery to the nearby Valley Park. There was controversy surrounding this proposal as it is in close proximity to Northern Ireland children's hospice.

== Civil parish ==
The civil parish contains the following townlands:

=== B ===
Ballycraigy, Ballyduff, Ballygolan, Ballyhenry, Ballyhowne, Ballyvesey

=== C ===
Carnmoney, Carnmoney Bog, Carnmoney Glebe, Collinward, Croghfern

=== D ===
Drumnadrough, Dunanney

=== G ===
Glengormley

=== J ===
Jordanstown

=== M ===
Monkstown

=== W ===
Whiteabbey, White House

== See also ==
- List of civil parishes of County Antrim
