= Ardclinis =

Parish in County Antrim, Northern Ireland

Coordinates: 55.055°N 6.0042°W

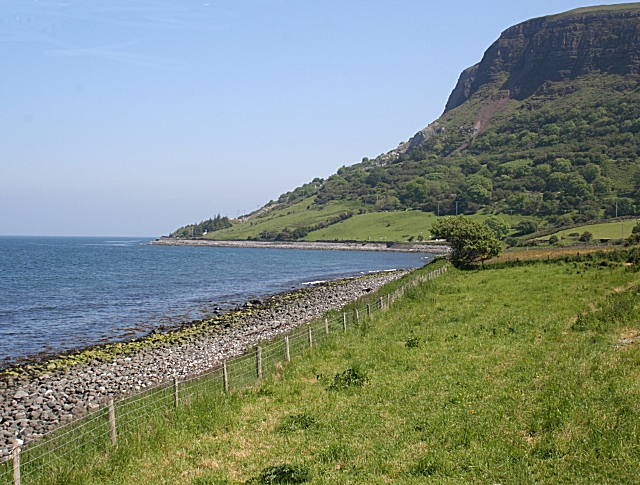
- Ardclinis townland in 2007

- Location within Northern Ireland
- County: County Antrim
- Country: Northern Ireland
- Sovereign state: United Kingdom

Ardclinis (from Irish Ard Claoininse '-Height of the Sloping Island') is a civil parish and townland (of 35 acres) in County Antrim, Northern Ireland. It is situated in the historic barony of Glenarm Lower.

== Civil parish of Ardclinis ==
The civil parish covers areas within the boundaries of Causeway Coast and Glens Borough Council and Mid and East Antrim Borough Council and includes the village of Carnlough.

== See also ==
- List of townlands in County Antrim
- List of civil parishes of County Antrim
