= Ballyboley (Ballycor) =

Coordinates: 54.8052°N 5.96095°W

Ballyboley: Irish: Baile na Buaile
- Location within Northern Ireland
- County: County Antrim
- Country: Northern Ireland
- Sovereign state: United Kingdom
- Police: Northern Ireland
- Fire: Northern Ireland
- Ambulance: Northern Ireland

Ballyboley is a townland in County Antrim, Northern Ireland in the barony of Antrim Upper.

== Name origin ==
Ballyboley is derived from the Irish Baile na Buaile, meaning the townland of the summer milking place, referencing the practice of moving cattle to a mountain pasture during the summer months, known as booleying in Hiberno-English.

== Ballyboley Forest ==
Ballyboley Forest was planted in 1957 and is maintained by the Northern Ireland Department of Agriculture, Environment and Rural Affairs.

The site is reputedly haunted.
