= Isle of Muck, County Antrim =

Island in County Antrim, Northern Ireland

Coordinates: 54°50′54″N 5°43′7″W

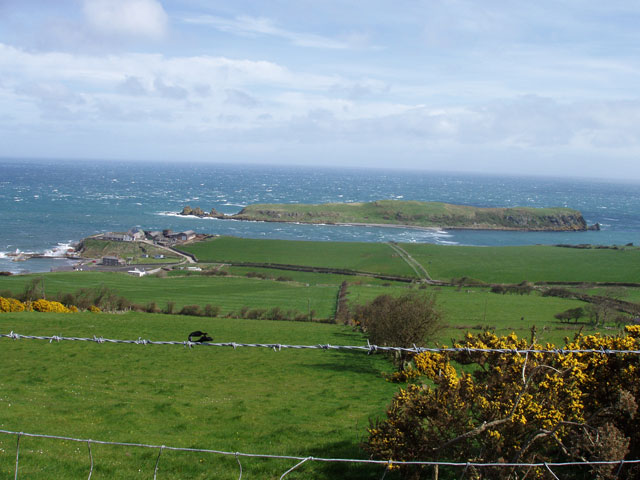
View of the island from the coast

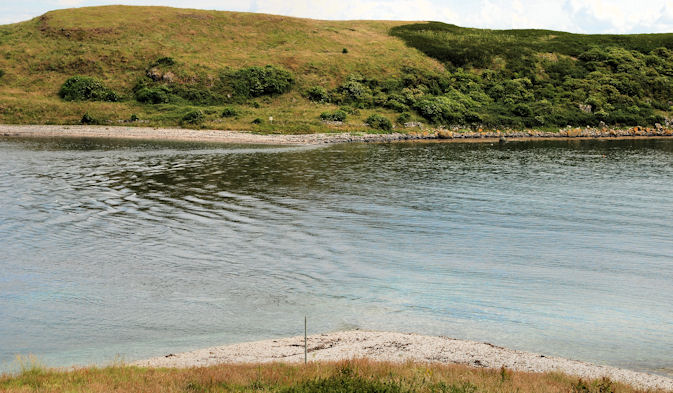
Sound, Isle of Muck

The Isle of Muck is a tiny island off Islandmagee, which is on the east coast of County Antrim, Northern Ireland, located between the towns of Larne and Whitehead. The Isle of Muck is not accessible to the public. It lies just off the coast of the townland and harbour of Portmuck.

The Isle has been managed by Ulster Wildlife as a seabird sanctuary for at least the last 25 years. Puffins were reintroduced in 2024 as a result of a seabird recovery project that was launched in 2017 to remove invasive brown rats from the island. Puffins are a priority species in Northern Ireland and red-listed in the UK, putting them in the highest conservation concern bracket due to food shortages, climate change, and predation by invasive species.
