= Ballylinney =

Village in County Antrim, Northern Ireland

Coordinates: 54°44′13″N 5°59′50″W

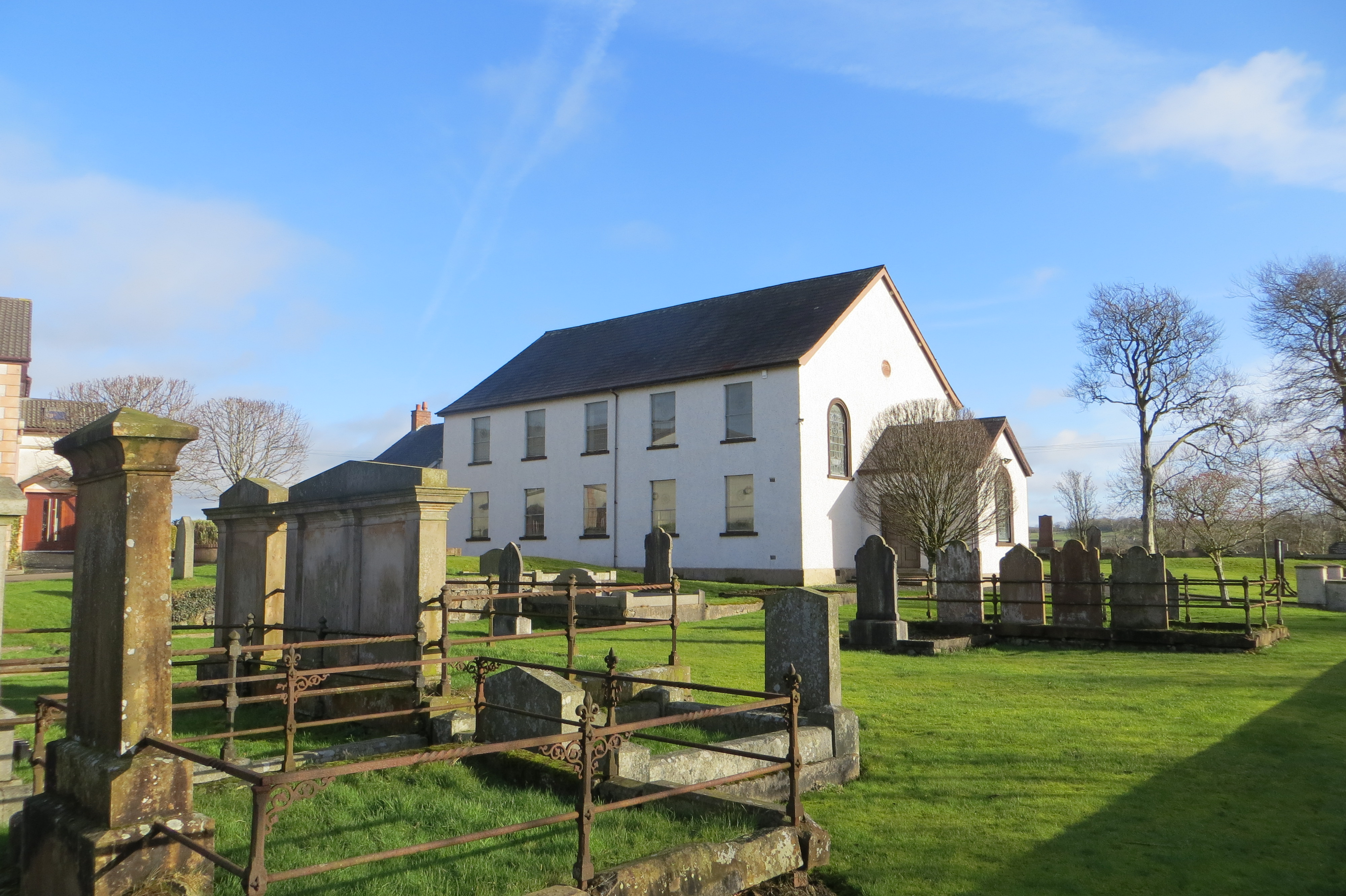
Ballylinney Road

Ballylinney or Ballylinny (from Irish Baile Linne, meaning 'homestead of the pond') is a small village and townland near Ballyclare in County Antrim, Northern Ireland. It is part of Antrim and Newtownabbey Borough Council. The village and townland are in the civil parish of Ballylinny.

== Churches ==
- Ballylinney Presbyterian Church

== See also ==
- List of towns in Northern Ireland
- List of villages in Northern Ireland
