= Knockans =

Iron Age cross dyke in Ireland

The Knockans is an Iron Age linear earthwork located in south-west Ireland, believed to be the site of the ancient Tailteann Games.

One of a number of Irish Iron Age linear earthworks, the Knockans is a double-banked monument partly destroyed by bulldozer in May 1997, which saw the northern bank totally destroyed and other material damage done.

== See also ==
- Black Pig's Dyke
- Dorsey, County Armagh
- Rathduff trench
- Magheracar earthwork
