= Ballybogy =

Village and townland in County Antrim, Northern Ireland

Coordinates: 55°07′N 6°34′W

Ballybogy, or Ballybogey (from Irish Baile an Bhogaigh 'townland of the bog'), is a small village and townland in County Antrim, Northern Ireland. It is located 7 km north-north-west of Ballymoney and 7 km east of Coleraine, lying within the Causeway Coast and Glens district. It is known as Boggie in Scots. As of the 2011 census, it had a population of 539 people. Of these, 4.2% were from a Catholic background and 88.1% were from a Protestant background.

== See also ==
- List of towns and villages in Northern Ireland
