= Craigs, County Antrim =

Townland in Northern Ireland

Craigs Irish: Na Creaga
- Townland
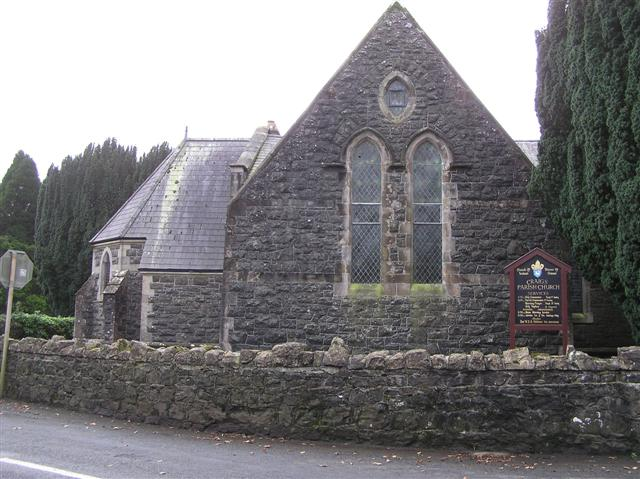
- Craigs Parish Church of Ireland

- Location within Northern Ireland
- Coordinates: 54°54′52″N 6°2′3″W
- Sovereign state: United Kingdom
- Country: Northern Ireland
- County: County Antrim

Area
  - Total: 4.38 sq mi (11.3 km^{2})

Craigs (Irish: Na Creaga, "The Rocks") is a townland in County Antrim, Northern Ireland. It is part of the Finvoy Civil Parish situated in the history Barony of Kilconway. It is a relatively large townland at a 4.38 square miles (2,800 acres), making it the ninth largest townland in County Antrim.

Modern archaeological excavations at Craigs found pottery and evidence of sod homes from the medieval period.

Craigs is a former civil parish and ecclesiastical parish within the Church of Ireland that consisted of the townland of Craigs, Cullybackey and Dreen.
