= Inver, County Antrim =

Civil parish in County Antrim, Northern Ireland

Coordinates: 54°50′54″N 5°49′35″W

Inver (Irish: Inbhear) is a civil parish in County Antrim, Northern Ireland located in the barony of Belfast Lower.

It contains four townlands:

- Ballysnod
- Browndod
- Carnduff
- Inver

== Notable features ==
- Inver Park, the home of Larne FC is located in the Inver townland.
- St Cedma's Church of Ireland stands on a religious site which is believed to date back more than 1,500 years, adjacent to Inver Park.
- A World War II anti-aircraft gun emplacement at Ballysnod which is a scheduled monument in state care.
