= Northern Ireland Fire and Rescue Service =

Statutory fire and rescue service for Northern Ireland

Operational area
- Country: Northern Ireland
- Address: 1 Seymour Street, Lisburn, BT27 4SX

Agency overview
- Established: 1 October 1973
- Annual calls: 36,069 (2016/2017)
- Employees: 2,230
- Chief Fire Officer: Aidan Jennings

Facilities and equipment
- Stations: 68

Website
- www.nifrs.org

The Northern Ireland Fire and Rescue Service (NIFRS) is the statutory fire and rescue service for Northern Ireland. The NIFRS is overseen by the Northern Ireland Fire and Rescue Service Board, which in turn is subordinate to the Department of Health.

NIFRS covers Northern Ireland, an area of over 5,500 square miles (14,000 km^{2}) with a population of 1.9 million people. Service Headquarters is located in Lisburn, County Antrim. As of 2012, the workforce of NIFRS was around 2,230 personnel.

Since 2023, Aidan Jennings is the Chief Fire & Rescue Officer.

== History ==
Organised firefighting began in what is now Northern Ireland in the 19th century. In 1800, the Belfast Borough Police were established and firefighting was one of their duties. The firefighting units were later separated from the police to form the Belfast Fire Brigade.

Until World War II, towns had their own fire services. In 1942, Northern Ireland's fire services were amalgamated into one, though they were separate from the National Fire Service that covered the rest of the United Kingdom. After the war, the service was split into the re-established Belfast Fire Brigade and the Northern Ireland Fire Authority, which covered the rest of Northern Ireland.

On 1 October 1973, the two fire services were merged into a single service, named Northern Ireland Fire Brigade. In 2006, the service adopted its current name of Northern Ireland Fire and Rescue Service.

== Fire stations ==
NIFRS has 67 fire stations split into four geographical command areas.

- Eastern area: 8 fire stations serving 494,000 people over an area of 63 square miles (160 km^{2}). It is headquartered in Belfast, with a north & west district headquarters at Whitla fire station, and a south & east district headquarters at Knock fire station.
- Northern area: 19 fire stations serving 426,000 people over an area of 1,308 square miles (3,390 km^{2}). It is headquartered in Ballymena, with district headquarters at Ballymena, Coleraine, and Glengormley.
- Southern area: 22 fire stations serving 564,000 people over an area of 1,454 square miles (3,770 km^{2}). It is headquartered in Portadown, with district headquarters in Bangor, Newcastle, Newry, and Portadown.
- Western area: 18 fire stations serving 417,000 people over an area of 2,646 square miles (6,850 km^{2}). It is headquartered in Derry, with district headquarters in Cookstown, Enniskillen, Derry, and Omagh.

== Statistics ==
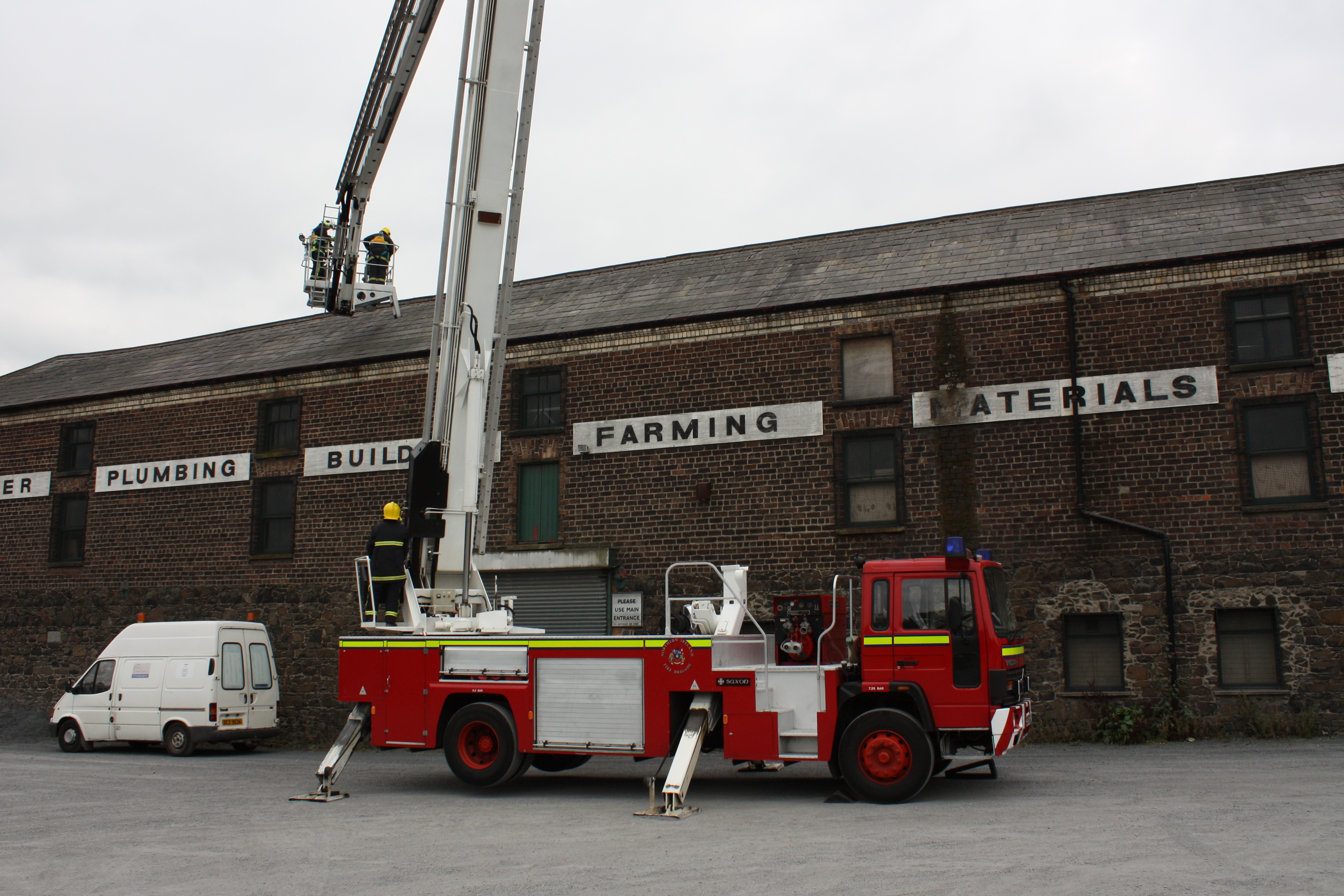
A ladder platform at Portadown

In 2016/17, NIFRS received 36,069 emergency calls, an increase of 7.9% on the previous year. Of these calls a total of 23,740 were mobilised.

== List of Chief Fire Officers ==
As of December 2023, Aidan Jennings is the chief fire officer of NIFRS. He succeeds Interim Chief Fire & Rescue Officer Andy Hearn.

1973: The Belfast Fire Brigade amalgamated with the Northern Ireland Fire Authority to become the Northern Ireland Fire Brigade.

- 1973–1982: George Morrison
- 1982–1984: Clive Halliday
- 1985–1988: William Beggs
- 1988–1995: Kenneth McNeill
- 1995–1996: Stephen Walker
- 1996–2002: John McClelland
- from 2003: Colin Lammey

2006: Northern Ireland Fire Brigade name changes to, Northern Ireland Fire & Rescue Service.

- 2010–2012: Peter Craig
- 2012–2015: Chris Kerr
- 2015–2016: Dale Ashford (interim)
- 2016–2020: Gary Thompson
- 2020–2021: Michael Graham (interim)
- 2021–2022: Peter O'Reilly
- 2022–2023: Andy Hearn (interim)
- 2023–present: Aidan Jennings

== See also ==
- Fire service in the United Kingdom
- Firefighters
- List of fire departments
- List of British firefighters killed in the line of duty
- List of Government departments and agencies in Northern Ireland
- History of the Belfast Fire Brigade
