= Northern Ireland Ambulance Service =

Ambulance service that serves the whole of Northern Ireland

Northern Ireland Ambulance Service Health and Social Care Trust
- Established: 1 April 1995
- Headquarters: Ambulance Headquarters, Knockbracken Healthcare Park, Belfast
- Region served: Northern Ireland
- Area size: 5,345 square miles (13,840 km^{2})
- Population: 1.9 million
- Establishments: 46 stations and deployment points
- Chair: Michele Larmour
- Chief executive: Maxine Paterson (Interim)
- Staff: 1,300 (2018/19)
- Website: nias.hscni.net

The Northern Ireland Ambulance Service (NIAS) is an ambulance service that serves the whole of Northern Ireland, approximately 1.9 million people. As with other ambulance services in the United Kingdom, it does not charge its patients directly for its services, but instead receives funding through general taxation. It responds to medical emergencies in Northern Ireland with the 300-plus ambulance vehicles at its disposal. Its fleet includes mini-buses, ambulance officers' cars, support vehicles, RRVs and accident and emergency ambulances.

== History ==
NIAS was formed on 1 April 1995 through the amalgamation of its four predecessors. Its full title is the Northern Ireland Ambulance Service Health and Social Care Trust.

The service is split up into five operational areas:

- Belfast Area, headquartered at Broadway Ambulance Station, Belfast
- South Eastern Area, headquartered at Bangor Ambulance Station
- Western Area, headquartered at Altnagelvin Hospital, Derry
- Northern Area, headquartered at Ballymena Ambulance Station
- Southern Area, headquartered at Craigavon Area Hospital

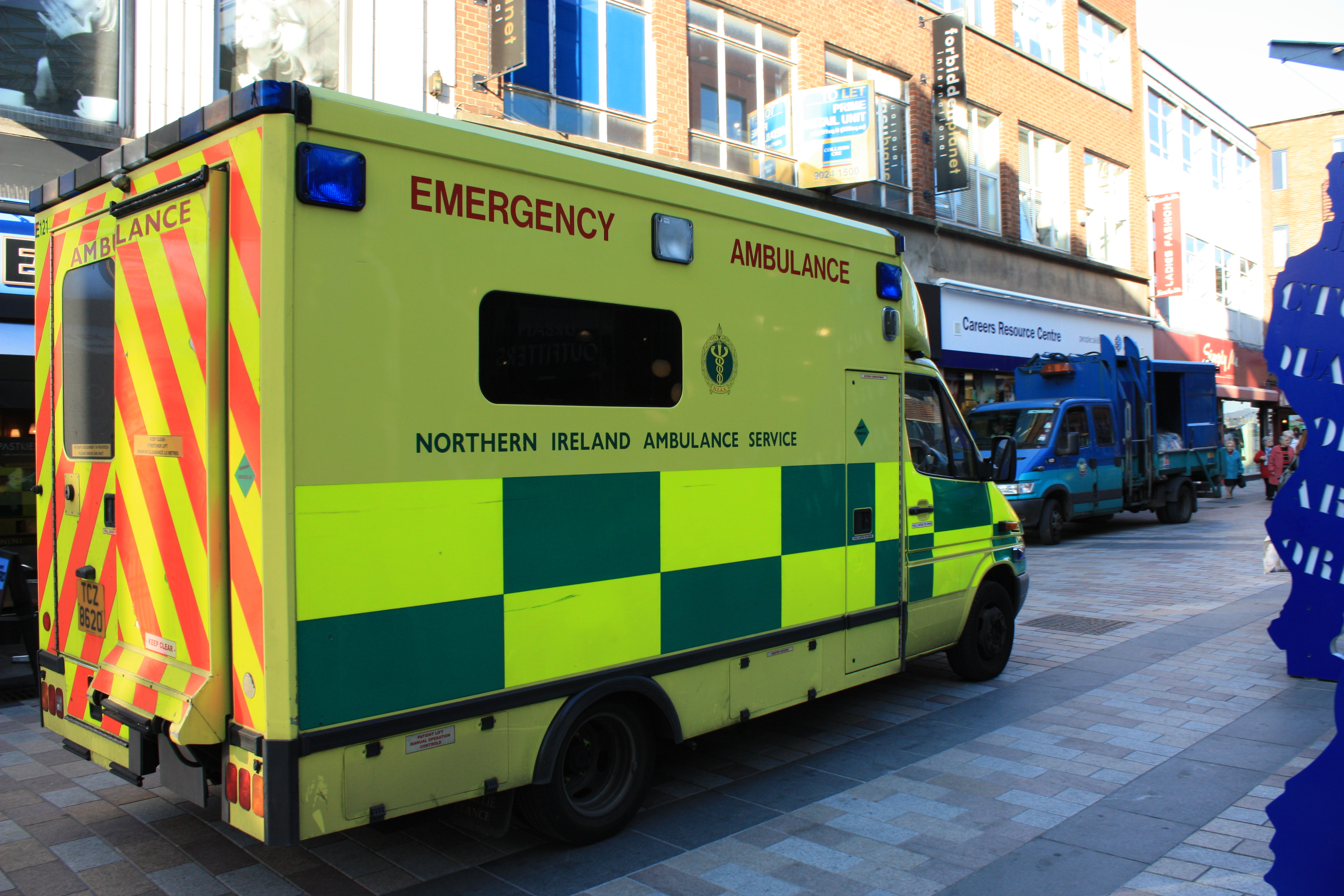
Ambulance in Ann Street, Belfast, October 2009

== Services ==
The service employs approximately 1,300 staff of which approximately 420 are paramedics, 300 are emergency medical technicians (EMT) and 100 are control centre staff, which work shift patterns to ensure the service is operational 24/7. They are based across 46 stations and sub-stations, two control centres (emergency and non-emergency) and a regional ambulance training centre. It responds to approximately 201,000 emergency (999) calls per year (with the number of 999 calls is increasing per year) with a combination of traditional emergency ambulances with two crew members, and rapid response vehicles (RRV) crewed by a single paramedic. RRVs respond mostly to calls where there is a potential immediate life-threat (Category 1) because they can respond more quickly than a conventional ambulance, RRVs can also be used to respond to lower category of calls that may not require hospital care. Double-crew ambulances respond to both emergency and non-emergency (healthcare professional-initiated urgent) calls as well as providing critical-care transfers between hospitals. The Trust aims to provide at least one paramedic to every emergency call by staffing each double-crew emergency ambulance with two paramedics, or a paramedic and an EMT, and utilising RRV. The trust has not adopted the controversial use of emergency care assistants (ECA) in the way some other UK ambulance services have.

In addition to the emergency medical services, NIAS has a fleet of Patient Care Service vehicles which are used for more routine patient transport to/from hospital. Within the Patient Care Service there are both single-crewed 'sitting case' (minibus) vehicles as well as double-crewed 'intermediate care vehicles' (ICV) which carry a stretcher.

In 2019, the service entered a partnership with the Ulster University to deliver a foundation degree in Paramedic Science, with the first cohort of trainees graduating in December 2019 and the final 'fourth' cohort graduating in January 2023. Future cohorts are now managed directly by Ulster University with the BSc honours degree commencing in September 2021.

In 2016, NIAS was commissioned to provide a helicopter emergency medical service (HEMS) for the first time in Northern Ireland, which was by then the only region of the UK not to have one. Following a public consultation, they partnered with the charity Air Ambulance Northern Ireland who provide the aircraft and airbase, with the doctors and paramedics provided by NIAS. The service undertook its first live mission in August 2017.

== Performance ==
NIAS triages all emergency calls using an internationally recognised system of prioritisation. Currently it has a target time of eight minutes to reach the scene of the highest priority calls i.e. those deemed to represent an immediate risk to life, but during December 2017 only 47.5% of this target was met therefore the average response time in Northern Ireland was 16 minutes 10 seconds. Currently the trust works with volunteer and private ambulance services to help cope and meet key response times, this is a result of the current increased demand due to an aging population and the squeeze on public spending across Northern Ireland over the last decade. Staff have expressed concern by the growing pressures they face and overall low morale across the service. The ambulance service aims to restructure their service to cope with future increased demand.

In September 2018, the ambulance service requested an additional £30 million in funding from the Department of Health to restructure the service and to recruit an additional 300 staff members, most of whom would be Paramedics, EMTs and emergency call takers. This recruitment is meant to quicken response times and relieve pressure on staff. As of May 2022 this funding has not been delivered.

In July 2022, NIAS average regional response time to the second highest priority calls (e.g. chest pain) had risen to 39 minutes and 31 seconds. Paramedics have voiced their concern following reports that these lengthy response times have been a 'possible contributing factor' towards the death of 14 people. The current NIAS Chief Executive Michael Bloomfield has expressed his disappointment and partly blames the poor response times on the high number of staff shortages and lengthy waiting times to hand over patients at Emergency Departments.

== See also ==
- Emergency medical services in the United Kingdom
- National Health Service
- List of Government departments and agencies in Northern Ireland
- HSE National Ambulance Service – Ambulance service in the Republic of Ireland
