= List of Irish cattle breeds =

This is a list of the cattle breeds considered in Ireland to be wholly or partly of Irish origin. Some may have complex or obscure histories, so inclusion here does not necessarily imply that a breed is predominantly or exclusively Irish.

== Indigenous breeds ==
Name	Notes	Image
Bó Riabhach^{[1]}	In 2024, the numbers stood at 150.	
Dexter^{[1]}^{[2]}^{[3]}^{[4]}	Originated in the eighteenth century in County Kerry, in south-western Ireland	
Droimeann^{[1]}^{[2]}^{[3]}; Droimfhionn^{[5]}; Drimmon^{[4]}	Originated in the Iveragh Peninsula in County Kerry	
Irish Dun	A breed reputed to have been introduced to Ireland by the Vikings. A 1974 survey conducted by the Rare Breeds Survival Trust found three cows and no bulls, by December 1975 the breed was considered extinct.^{[7]}	
Irish Moiled^{[1]}^{[2]}^{[3]}; Irish Maol^{[4]}	Originated in counties Leitrim, Sligo, Down, and Donegal	
Kerry^{[1]}^{[2]}^{[3]}^{[4]}	Believed to be one of the oldest breeds in Europe	
Tory Island	Critically endangered	
White Park^{[4]}	Mentioned in the ancient Irish epic, Táin Bó Cúailnge (The Cattle Raid of Cooley)^{[6]} Not listed as an Irish breed by the Irish Rare Breeds Society, the Irish Native Rare Breed Society, the National Inventory of Intangible Cultural Heritage or the Food and Agriculture Organization of the United Nations^{[1]}^{[2]}^{[3]}^{[4]}^{[5]}	

== Imported breeds ==
Name	Notes	Image
Blended Milking Shorthorn^{[5]}		
Irish Blonde d'Aquitaine^{[5]}		
Irish Charolais^{[5]}		
Irish Limousin^{[5]}		
Irish Shorthorn^{[4]}^{[5]}		
Irish Simmental^{[5]}		
