= Droimeann =

Rare breed of Irish cow

- Conservation status: DAFM (2020): "At Risk"
- Other names: Droimeannach, Irish White-backed
- Country of origin: Ireland
- Distribution: Ireland (primarily Munster)
- Standard: Droimeann Cattle Society
- Use: Dual-purpose beef/dairy, conservation grazing

Traits
- Weight: Male: 600–750 kg; Female: 400–550 kg
- Height: Male: 125–135 cm; Female: 115–125 cm
- Skin colour: Darkly pigmented
- Coat: Black, red, or blue with a white back and underside
- Horn status: Horned

Notes
- A distinct native Irish breed established in 2016; known for its hardiness and docility.
- Cattle; Bos (primigenius) taurus

The Droimeann cow (Irish pronunciation: [ˈd̪ˠɾˠɪmʲən̪ˠ], literally "white-backed") is an endangered breed of cattle unique to Ireland. It was officially recognised as a rare native breed on 8 January 2020 following DNA profiling which showed that it was genetically distinct from other breeds. Animals may be black, red or roan, but most have a white stripe along the back. In 2020, there were 243 breeding females and 23 breeding males registered.

== Description ==
The Droimeann is a small to medium-sized breed. Their conformation is similar to other dairy breeds and they have a placid disposition. They are variable in colour, ranging from nearly entirely black, through red, to white with dark ears and muzzle. Often the sides and flanks are black, red or blue roan while the topline of the back and the underside of the belly are white. The cattle are hardy and will thrive on poor quality forage which they are good at converting into milk and meat. The milk is high in solids and the meat is well-marbled and has a distinctive flavour. The breed is known for maturing early and being highly fertile.

The Droimeann Cattle Society was established on 11 September 2016 at a meeting of breeders and others interested in the preservation of the breed. A Droimeann Cattle Herdbook was launched on 22 August 2018. To be eligible for inclusion in the herdbook, all animals will have to be genetically tested, and newborn calves will need to be tested before being eligible for inclusion. By January 2020 there were 243 breeding females and 23 breeding males included in the herdbook.

The breed originated in the South West of Ireland. References to the breed can be found in early Irish literature and folklore.

== Rare breed status ==
The breed was officially recognised as a rare native breed on 8 January 2020. The Minister for Agriculture, Michael Creed said that "the granting of rare breed status to the Droimeann represented a significant boost for the breed, offering both recognition and incentives to farmers in their efforts to preserve the Droimeann".

== See also ==
- Irish Moiled cattle
- Dexter cattle
- Kerry cattle
- Brindle cattle
- Tory Island cattle
- White Park cattle
