= White Park =

White Park may refer to:

Places

- White Park Bay, in County Antrim, Northern Ireland, UK
- White Park, County Antrim, a townland in Northern Ireland, UK
- White Park (Concord, New Hampshire), a public park in Concord, New Hampshire, US
- White Park, a public park in Morgantown, West Virginia, US

Cattle

- White Park cattle, also known as Ancient White Park, White Forest, White Horned, Wild White, and "the Park"
- American White Park, a different breed of cattle
- British White cattle, another breed, sometimes called "British White Park"
