= Irish Moiled =

Breed of cattle

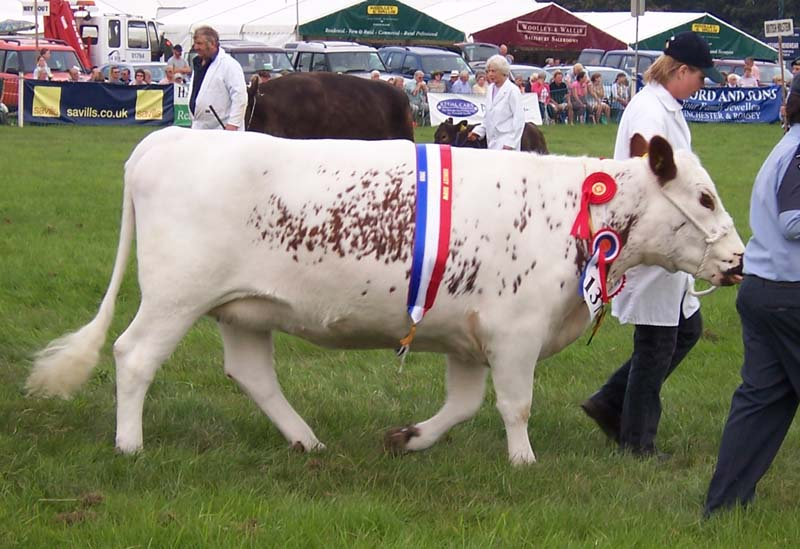
- A prize-winning Irish Moiled
- Conservation status: FAO (2007): endangered-maintained; RBST (2021–2022): at risk; DAD-IS (2023): at risk/endangered
- Other names: Moile, Maol, Irish Moilie
- Nicknames: Moilie
- Country of origin: Ireland
- Distribution: Ireland, Northern Ireland, Great Britain
- Standard: Irish Moiled Cattle Society
- Use: Dual-purpose beef/dairy, conservation grazing

Traits
- Weight: Male: 750–850 kg; Female: 550–650 kg
- Height: Male: 130–145 cm; Female: 125–135 cm
- Skin colour: Pigmented; muzzle ideally grey or bronze
- Coat: Red with white "finching" (stripe) on back and underside; mottled face
- Horn status: Polled

Notes
- One of the oldest indigenous Irish breeds; known for its distinctive domed head.
- Cattle; Bos (primigenius) taurus

The Irish Moiled (Irish: Bó Maol) is a rare cattle breed from Ireland. It is a dual-purpose breed, reared for both beef and milk. It originated in County Leitrim, County Sligo, County Down, and County Donegal, but the breed is now found throughout Ireland.

== History ==
The Irish Moiled Cow is one of the oldest breeds of cow in Ireland. Throughout the 19th century, they were relatively popular throughout Ireland, due to being a hardy breed that could effectively be used for both their milk and meat. With the introduction of more specialised breeds (such as friesians for milk, herefords/anguses for beef, etc.), their popularity began to decline. By the late 1970s, only 30 cows and 2 bulls remained, being maintained by only two breeders. In 1979 they were marked as "critically endangered" by the Rare Breed Survival Trust.

== Characteristics ==
The Irish Moiled Cow is one of the most distinctive breeds in Ireland. They are polled cows (they do not grow horns) and are generally red with a white line on the back and stomach. They typically have a flecked face and are dual producers being used for both beef and dairy products, which is uncommon with most breeds. These cows are slightly smaller than average, weighing around 550 kg. The breed originated in County Leitrim, County Sligo, and County Donegal, but is now found throughout Ireland. The name "Irish Moiled Cow" takes its origins from the Irish word Maol meaning bald and references the fact that these cows do not have horns. Until recently the breed was in decline, falling to just two dairy herds in the 1970s with a population that included just 20 breeding females. However, with the introduction of bloodlines from Jersey, Ayrshire, Shorthorn and Friesian breeds, the numbers have improved and are now being produced throughout Ireland, as well as in parts of Britain.

== Use ==
Irish Moiled meat is remarked to be of great quality and has a distinct flavour. This cow is known to produce good beef in poor conditions but needs care to protect it from becoming overweight. It was the quality of Irish Moiled beef that had saved the breed from extinction.

The Irish Moiled cow has a gestation period of about nine months if kept at a decent health.

== Gallery ==
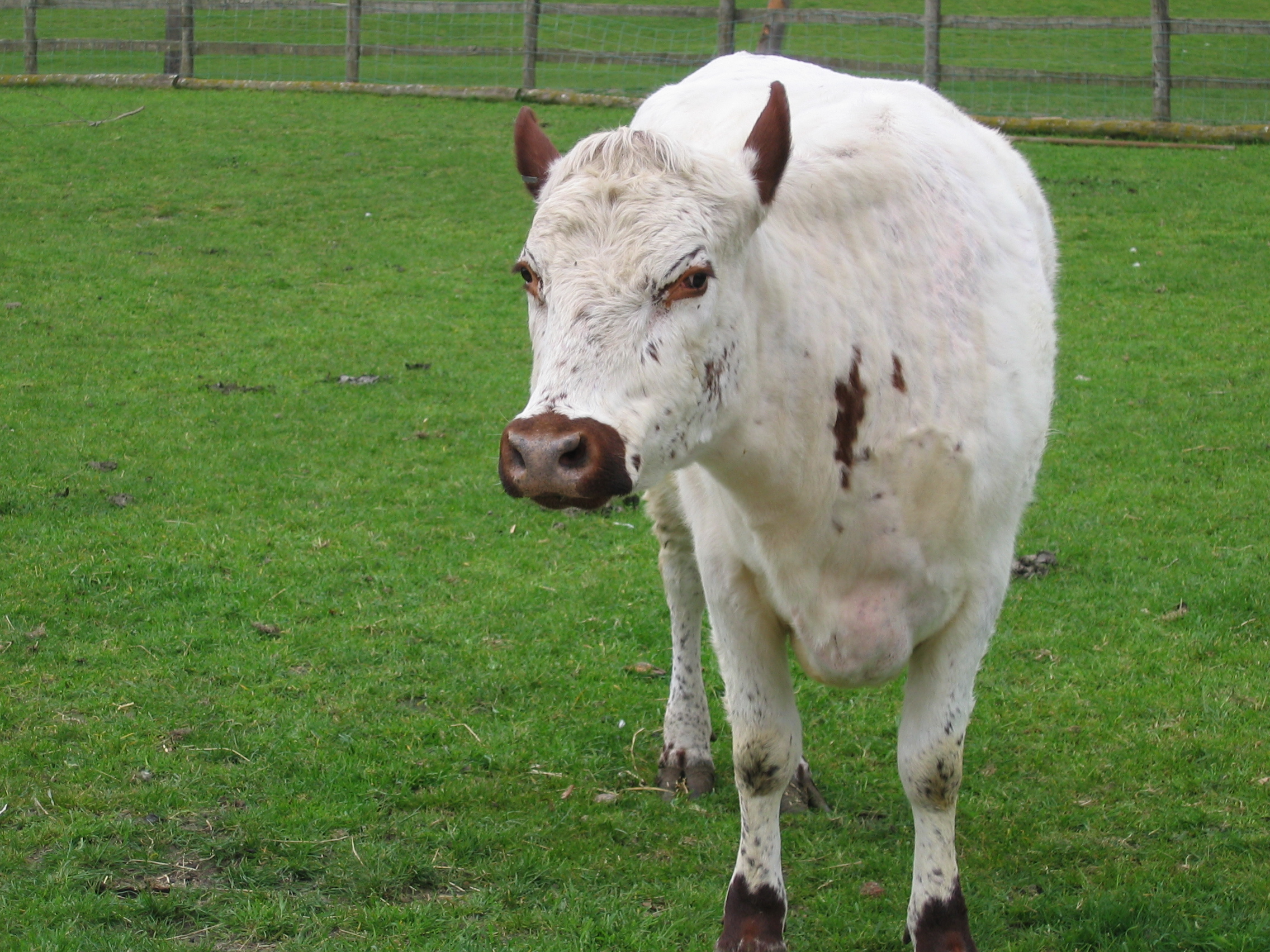
Irish Moiled cow in Mudchute Farm, UK

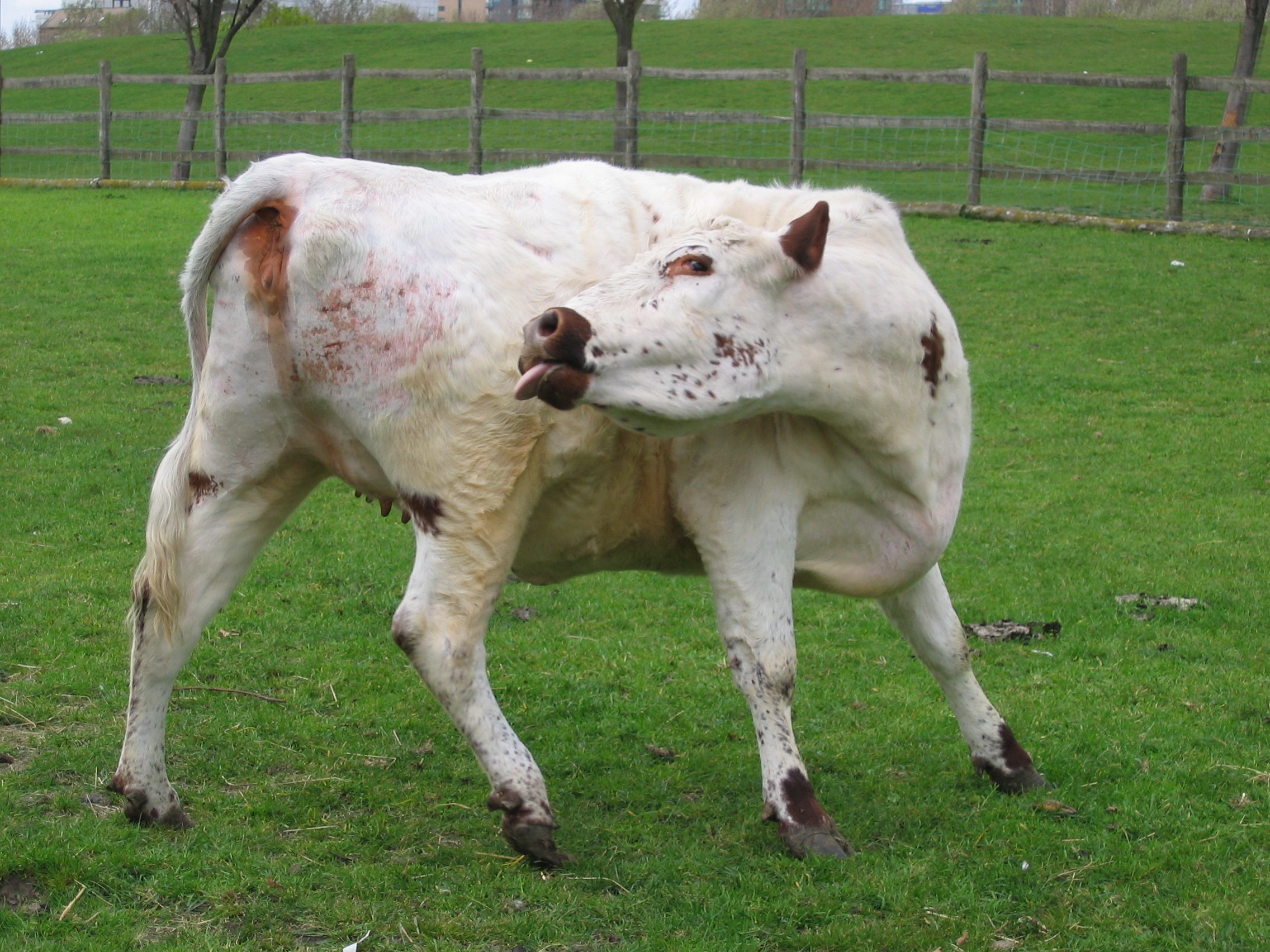
Irish Moiled cow licking itself in Mudchute Farm, UK

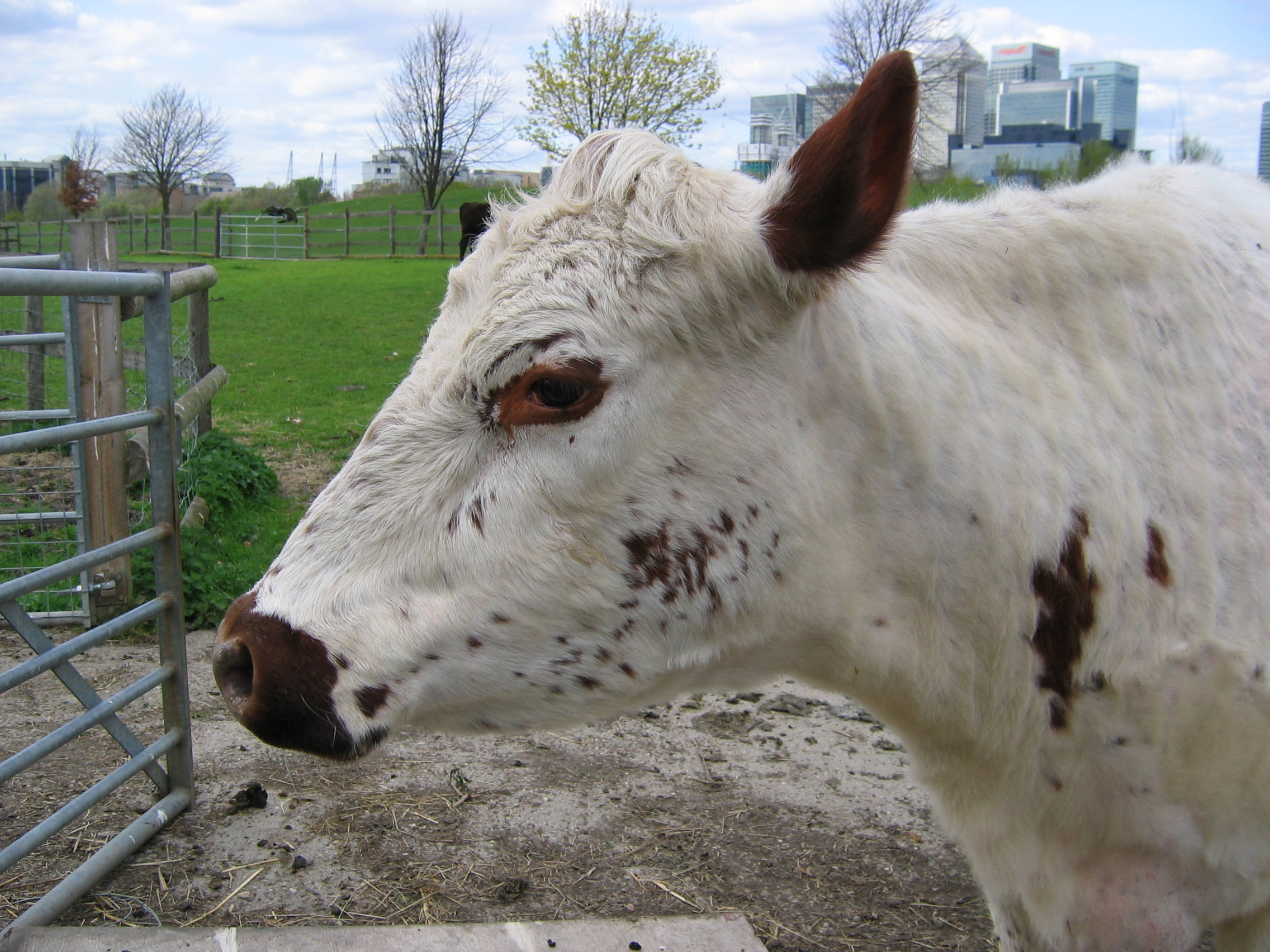
Irish Moiled cow head in Mudchute Farm, UK

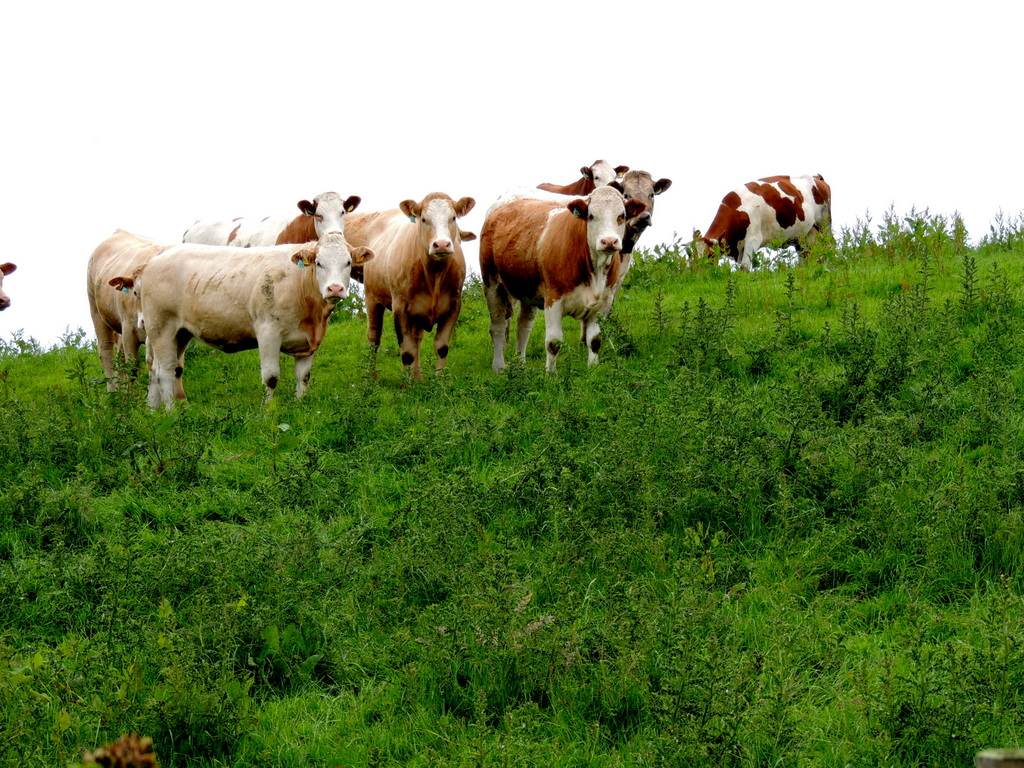
Irish moiled cattle in Bracky, Northern Ireland

== See also ==
- Droimeann cattle
- Dexter cattle
- Kerry cattle
- Bó Riabhach
- Tory Island cattle
- White Park cattle
