= Ballintoy Parish Church =

Church in County Antrim, Northern Ireland

Coordinates: 55.2401°N 6.3671°W

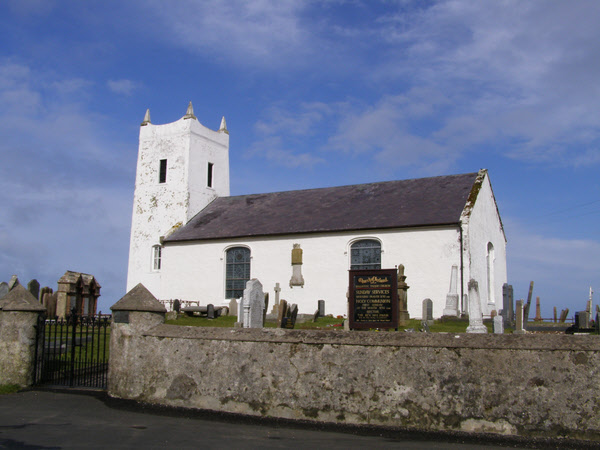
Ballintoy Church of Ireland parish church

Ballintoy Parish Church is the main Church of Ireland church of Ballintoy, County Antrim, Northern Ireland. The church, located a short distance from the town, is one of the most northerly churches in the Diocese of Connor. It is a Grade-B+ listed building.

== History ==
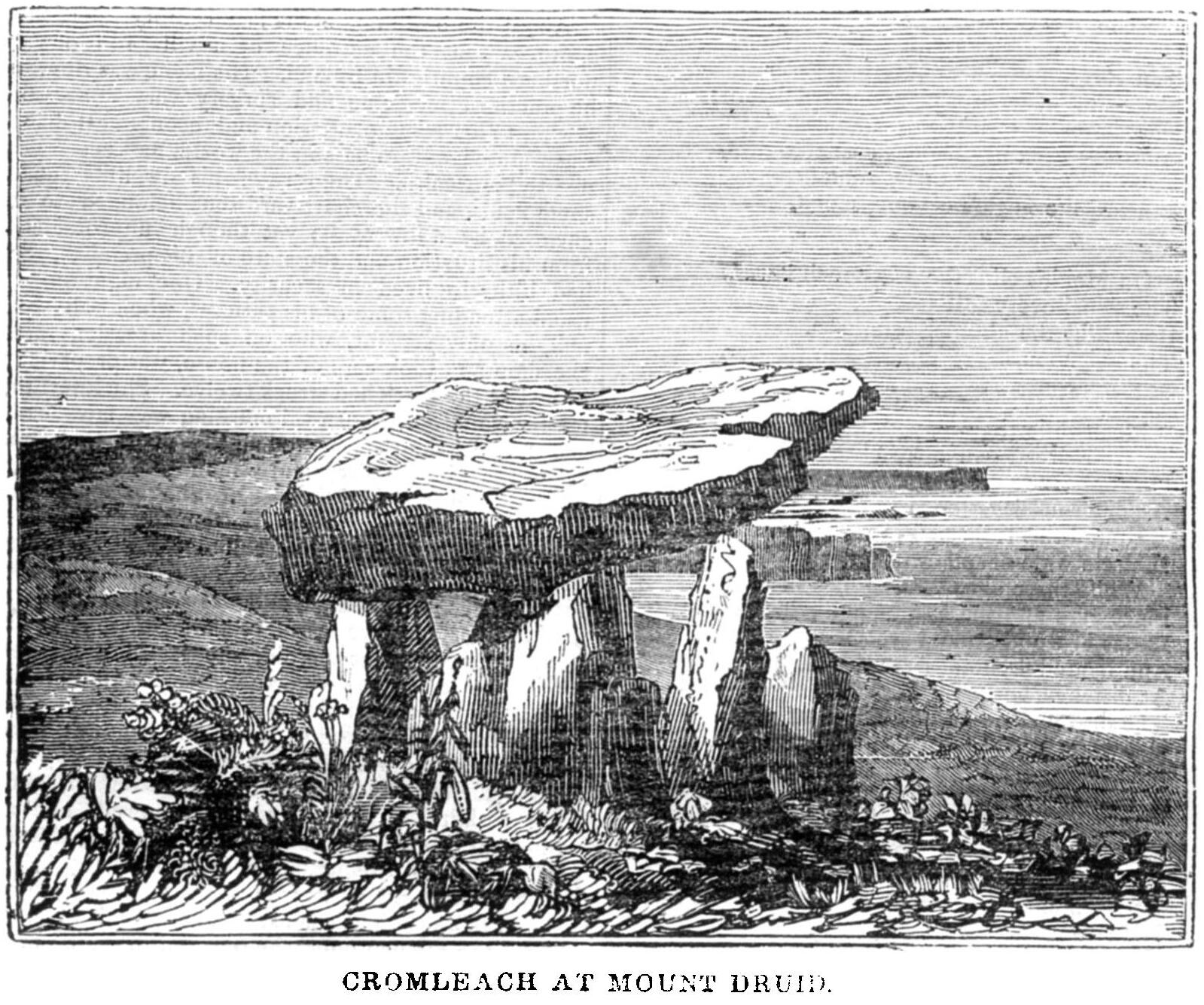
This cromlech stood in the nearby grounds of the Rev. Robert Trail, Dublin Penny Journal, 1834

The church as it now stands was completed in 1813 as a replacement for an older structure. It was built under the auspices of Revd Robert Trail to a plan drawn by Henry Wynne. In June 1857, a new organ was installed by Dublin-based firm Telford & Telford, at a cost of £37. A renovation was undertaken in 1883 and involved adding a new pulpit, pews, flooring and heating. Repairs were also made to the roof and spire. Further roof repairs were undertaken following damage caused by a hurricane in December 1894.

== Architecture ==
The church is two bays in length, with a single north transept, the tower being retained from an earlier building. Between the nave and the transept is a small chapel or baptistry.

== Features ==
On an exterior wall of the church is a sun dial and tide clock which are dated by an inscription to 1817.

Though no longer rung, the old church bell bears the following inscription:

"Archibald Stewart gave me: Charles, his son, re-cast me, anno 1686 and Archibald the son of Charles re-cast and augmented me anno 1718"

The communion plate or chalice is reputed to have been manufactured before 1638 by Dublin silversmith James Vanderbeg or Vanderbeck.
