= Irish calendar =

Gregorian calendar as it is in use in Ireland

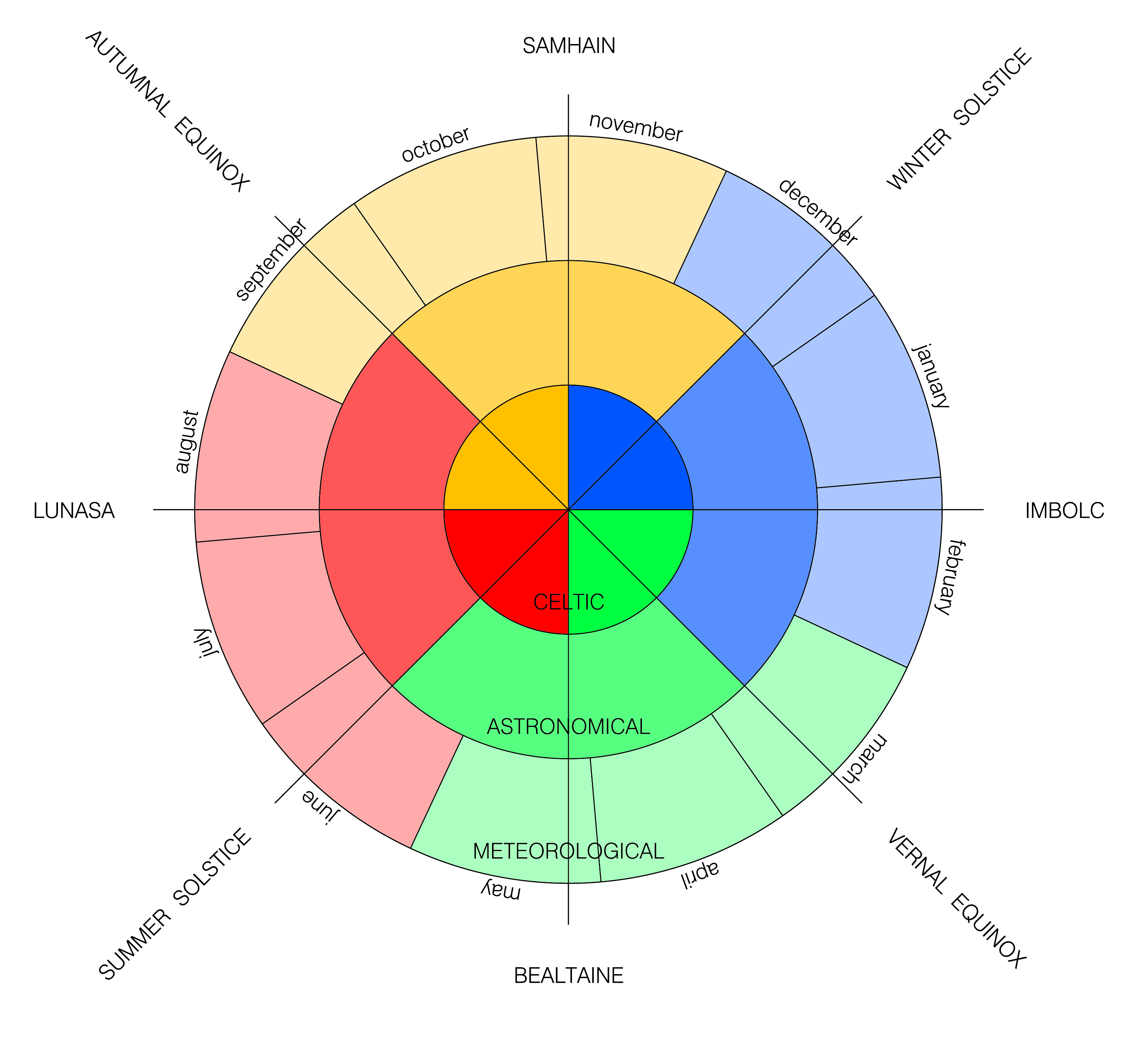
Diagram comparing the Celtic, astronomical and meteorological calendars

The Irish calendar is the Gregorian calendar as it is in use in Ireland, but also incorporating Irish cultural festivals and views of the division of the seasons, presumably inherited from earlier Celtic calendar traditions.

The traditional Irish Calendar uses Astronomical Timing, however Meteorological Timing is also used by organisations such as the Met Éireann. Both are in use in the Republic of Ireland, however generally the Astronomical Calendar is the most commonly used.

In English-language Julian calendars and its derivatives, the months are based on names from Classical mythology, such as the name "February" which derives from the Roman purification rite, Februa. In the Irish calendar, the names of the months in the Irish language refer to Celtic religion and mythology, and generally predate the arrival of Christianity. The words for May (Bealtaine), August (Lúnasa) and November (Samhain), are the names of Gaelic religious festivals. In addition, the names for September (Meán Fómhair) and October (Deireadh Fómhair) translate directly as "middle of harvest" and "end of harvest". Christianity has also left its mark on the Irish months: the name for December (Nollaig) derives from Latin natalicia 'birthday', referring to the birth of Christ.

== Names of the seasons and months ==
- Winter (Geimhreadh) – November, December, January (Samhain, Nollaig, Eanáir)
- Spring (Earrach) – February, March, April (Imbolc, then Feabhra, Márta, Aibreán)
- Summer (Samhradh) – May, June, July (Bealtaine, Meitheamh, Iúil)
- Autumn (Fómhar 'Harvest') – August, September, October (Lúnasa, Meán Fómhair, Deireadh Fómhair)

== Names of the days ==
Historical texts suggest that, during Ireland's Gaelic era, the day began and ended at sunset. Through contact with the Romans, the seven-day week was borrowed by continental Celts, and then spread to the people of Ireland. In Irish, four days of the week have names derived from Latin, while the other three relate to the fasting done by early Gaelic Christians.

English	Irish	Scottish Gaelic	Manx	origin of name
Monday	Luain; Dé Luain	Diluain	Lhein; Jelune	from dies Lunae
Tuesday	Máirt; Dé Máirt	Dimàirt	Mayrt; Jemayrt	from Latin dies Martis
Wednesday	Céadaoin; Dé Céadaoin	Diciadain	Crean; Jecrean	referring to Gaelic fasting: from Old Irish céd aín (first fast) i.e. the first fast of the week
Thursday	Déardaoin	Diardaoin	Jerdein	the day between the fasts, from Old Irish eter dá aín (between two fast)
Friday	Aoine; Dé hAoine	Dihaoine	Eney; Jeheiney	the day of the fast, from Old Irish aíne (fast)
Saturday	Satharn; Dé Sathairn	Disathairne	Sarn; Jesarn	from Latin dies Saturni
Sunday	Domhnach; Dé Domhnaigh	Didòmhnaich	Doonaght; Jedoonee	from Latin dies Dominicus (an alternative Latin name for Sunday, dies Solis being more common)

== See also ==
- Calendar of saints
- Celtic calendar
- Coligny calendar
- Gregorian calendar
- Liturgical year
- The Old Cows Days/The Days of the Brindled Cow
