= Lunitidal interval =

Time lag from the Moon's culmination to the next high tide

The lunitidal interval measures the time lag from lunar culmination to the next high tide at a given location. It is also called the high water interval (HWI). Sometimes a term is not used for the time lag, but instead the terms age or establishment of the tide are used for the entry that is in tide tables.

Tides are known to be mainly caused by the Moon's gravity. Theoretically, peak tidal forces at a given location would concur when the Moon reaches the meridian, but a delay usually precedes high tide, depending largely on the shape of the coastline and the sea floor. Therefore, the lunitidal interval varies from place to place – from three hours over deep oceans to eight hours at New York Harbor. The lunitidal interval further varies within about 3h ± 30 minutes according to the lunar phase. (This is caused by the time interval associated with the solar tides.)

Hundreds of factors are involved in the lunitidal interval, especially near the shoreline. However, for those far away enough from the coast, the dominating consideration is the speed of gravity waves, which increases with the water's depth. It is proportional to the square root of the depth, for the extremely long gravity waves that transport the water that is following the Moon around the Earth. The oceans are about 4 km (2.5 mi) deep and would have to be at least 22 km (14 mi) deep for these waves to keep up with the Moon. As mentioned above, a similar time lag accompanies the solar tides, a complicating factor that varies with the lunar phases. By observing the age of leap tides, it becomes clear that the delay can actually exceed 24 hours in some locations.

The approximate lunitidal interval can be calculated if the moonrise, moonset, and high tide times are known for a location. In the Northern Hemisphere, the Moon reaches its highest point when it is southernmost in the sky. Lunar data are available from printed or online tables. Tide tables forecast the time of the next high water. The difference between these two times is the lunitidal interval. This value can be used to calibrate tide clock and wristwatches to allow for simple but crude tidal predictions. The lunitidal intervals vary day-by-day even at a given location.

== See also ==
- Phase (waves) – Elapsed fraction of a cycle of a periodic function
