= Carrick-a-Rede Rope Bridge =

Bridge in County Antrim, Northern Ireland

Carrick-a-Rede Rope Bridge Carraig a'Ráid
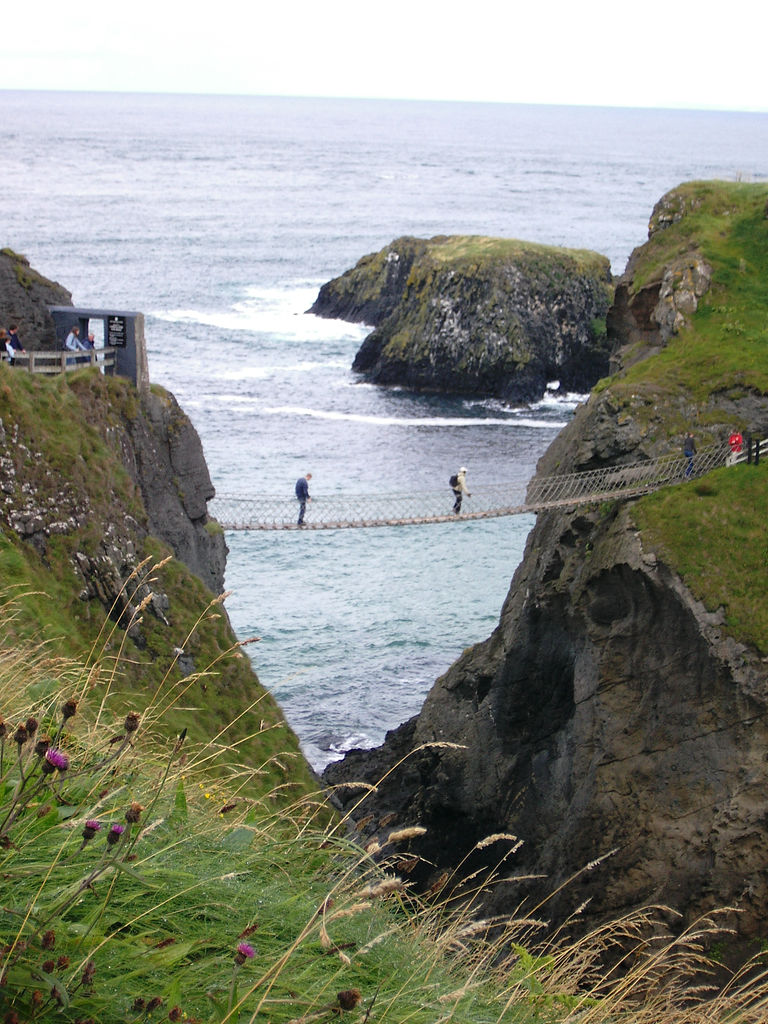
- Coordinates: 55°14′24.13″N 6°19′51.76″W
- Locale: Ballintoy, County Antrim

Characteristics
- Design: simple suspension bridge
- Material: Rope
- Total length: 20 metres (66 ft)
- Width: 1 metre (3.3 ft)
- Height: 30 metres (98 ft)
- No. of spans: 1
- Load limit: 8 pedestrians

History
- Constructed by: Heyn Construction
- Opened: 2008 (current bridge)

Statistics
- Toll: £14 – £15.50 (adult) £7 – £7.75 (child)

Location
- Interactive map of Carrick-a-Rede Rope Bridge

The Carrick-a-Rede Rope Bridge (locally pronounced carrick-a-reed) is a rope bridge near Ballintoy in County Antrim, Northern Ireland. The bridge links the mainland to the tiny island of Carrickarede (from Irish Carraig a' Ráid, meaning 'rock of the casting'). It spans 20 metres (66 ft) and is 30 metres (98 ft) above the rocks below. The bridge is mainly a tourist attraction and is owned and maintained by the National Trust. In 2018, the bridge had 485,736 visitors. Since 2009, the bridge has been open all year round (subject to weather) and people may cross it for a £14 to £15 (adult) fee.

== History ==
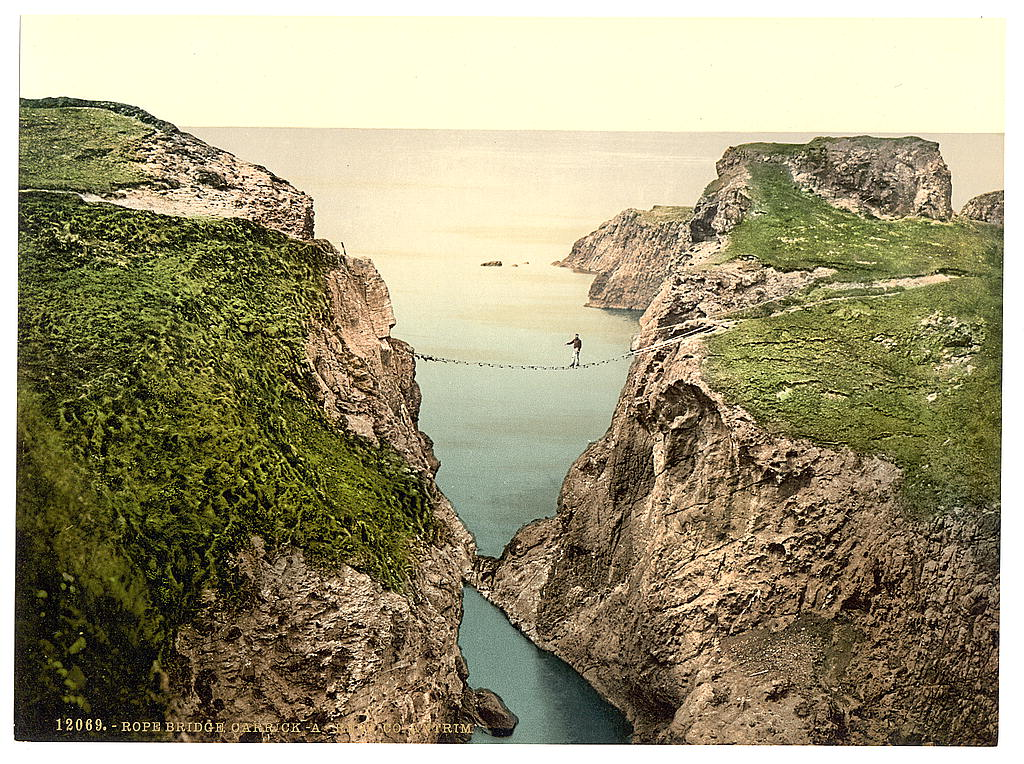
Carrick-a-Rede Rope Bridge, circa 1890-1900

It is thought salmon fishermen have been building bridges to the island for over 350 years. It has taken many forms over the years. In the 1970s it had only one handrail and large gaps between the slats. A new bridge, tested up to ten tonnes, was built with the help of local climbers and abseilers in 2000. Another was built in 2004 and offered visitors and fishermen alike a much safer passage to the island. The current wire rope and Douglas fir bridge was made by Heyn Construction in Belfast and raised early in 2008 at a cost of over £16,000. There have been many instances where visitors, unable to face the walk back across the bridge, have had to be taken off the island by boat.

On 24 May 2017, a routine inspection revealed that the bridge's structural ropes had been damaged overnight in an act of vandalism. The National Trust announced that the bridge would be closed "for the foreseeable future". However, on the following day it was announced that structural engineers had completed repairs, and that the bridge had been reopened.

== Fishing ==
It is no longer used by fishermen during the salmon season, which used to last from June until September, as there are now very few salmon left. In the 1960s, almost 300 fish were caught each day, but by 2002, only 250 were caught over the whole season. The salmon come through the area to spawn in the River Bann and the River Bush.

== Features ==
There are views of Rathlin Island and Scotland from the area. The site and surrounding area is designated an Area of Special Scientific Interest for its unique geology, flora, and fauna. Underneath there are large caves, which once served as home for boat builders and as shelter during stormy weather.

== Geology ==
Carrickarede island is the best example of a volcanic plug in Northern Ireland. Marine erosion has exposed a section through the neck of this old volcano.

The presence of tuff, explosion breccias, grey volcanic ash and explosion bombs show the extreme violence of the eruptions about 60 million years ago when molten rock punched its way through chalk.

Along the coast of this area, as with much of the Antrim plateau, the cliffs are of basalt with the characteristic Ulster chalk underneath. At Carrickarede, the ancient volcanic pipe has left dolerite, a tougher rock than basalt, which erodes more slowly. Behind the dolerite, to the south, the vent is filled with pyroclastic rocks that break down more easily, mostly a coarse tuff agglomerate. The combination of the hard rock out front and the softer rock behind, with long-term erosion by the waves, has eventually left this small island.

== In popular culture ==
A plate of this bridge (Artist: Thomas Mann Baynes – Engraved by: J. Davies) appeared in Fisher's Drawing Room Scrap Book, 1832, accompanied by a poetical illustration by Letitia Elizabeth Landon (L. E. L.) referring to a gentleman who is supposed to have lived on the island as a hermit at one time (possibly a rebel who had fled out of Scotland).

Seamus Heaney describes the bridge in his 1978 poem A Postcard from North Antrim:

A lone figure is waving
From the thin line of a bridge
Of ropes and slates, slung
Dangerously out between
The cliff-top and the pillar rock.

== Gallery ==
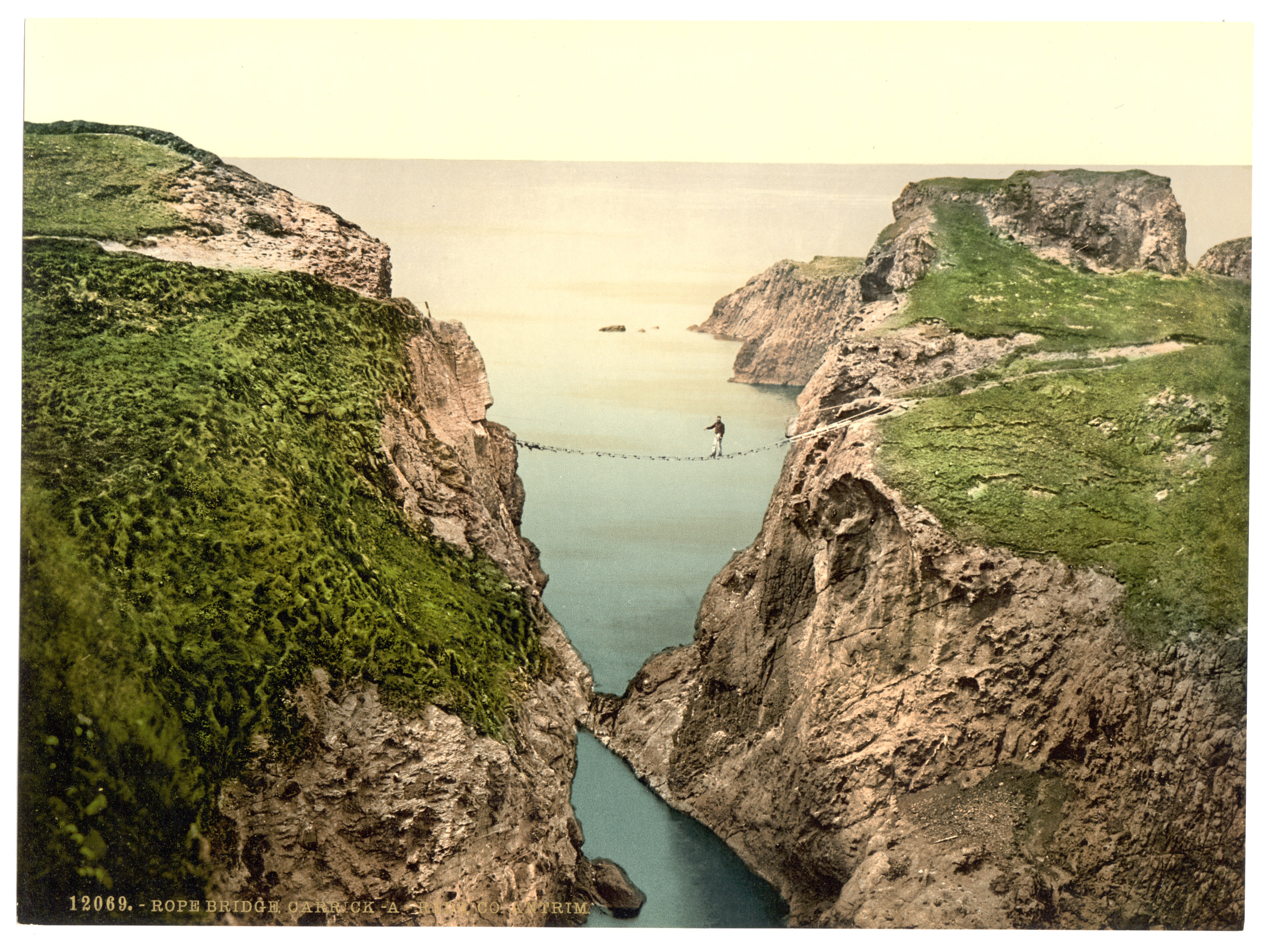
Photochrom of the Bridge, c. 1890

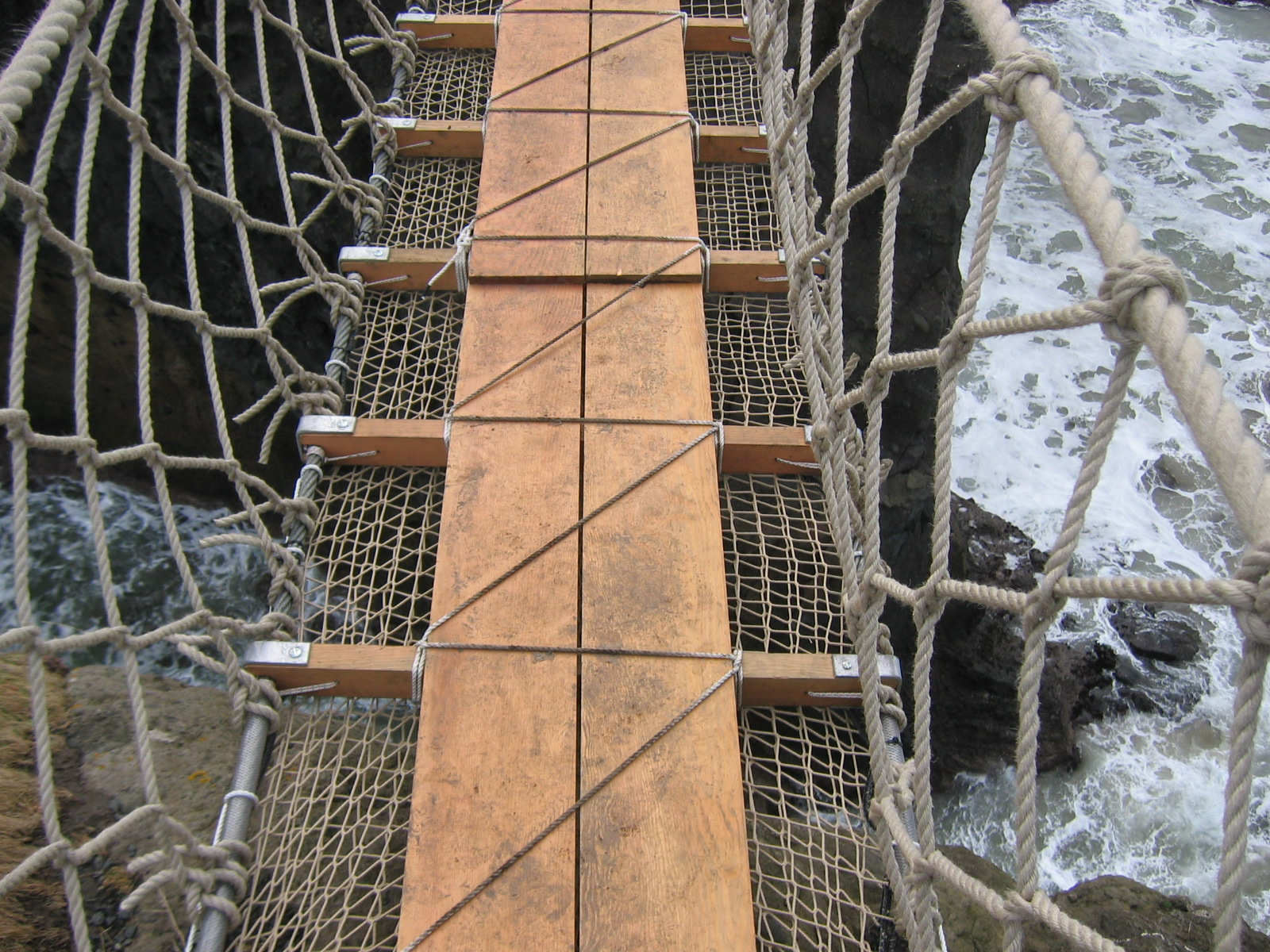
Bridge structure, 2004

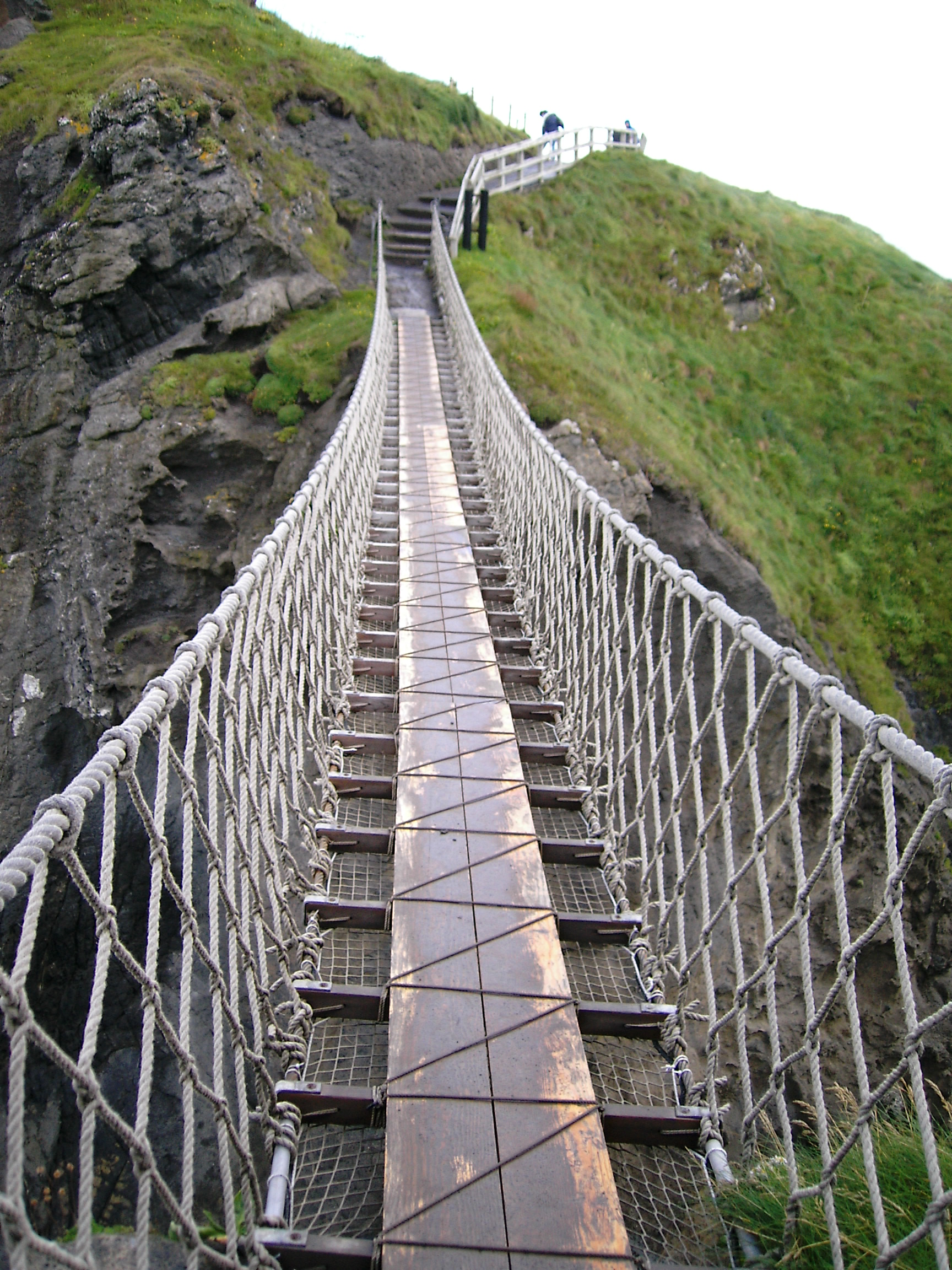
Bridge structure, 2005

Carrick-a-Rede Rope Bridge, 2006

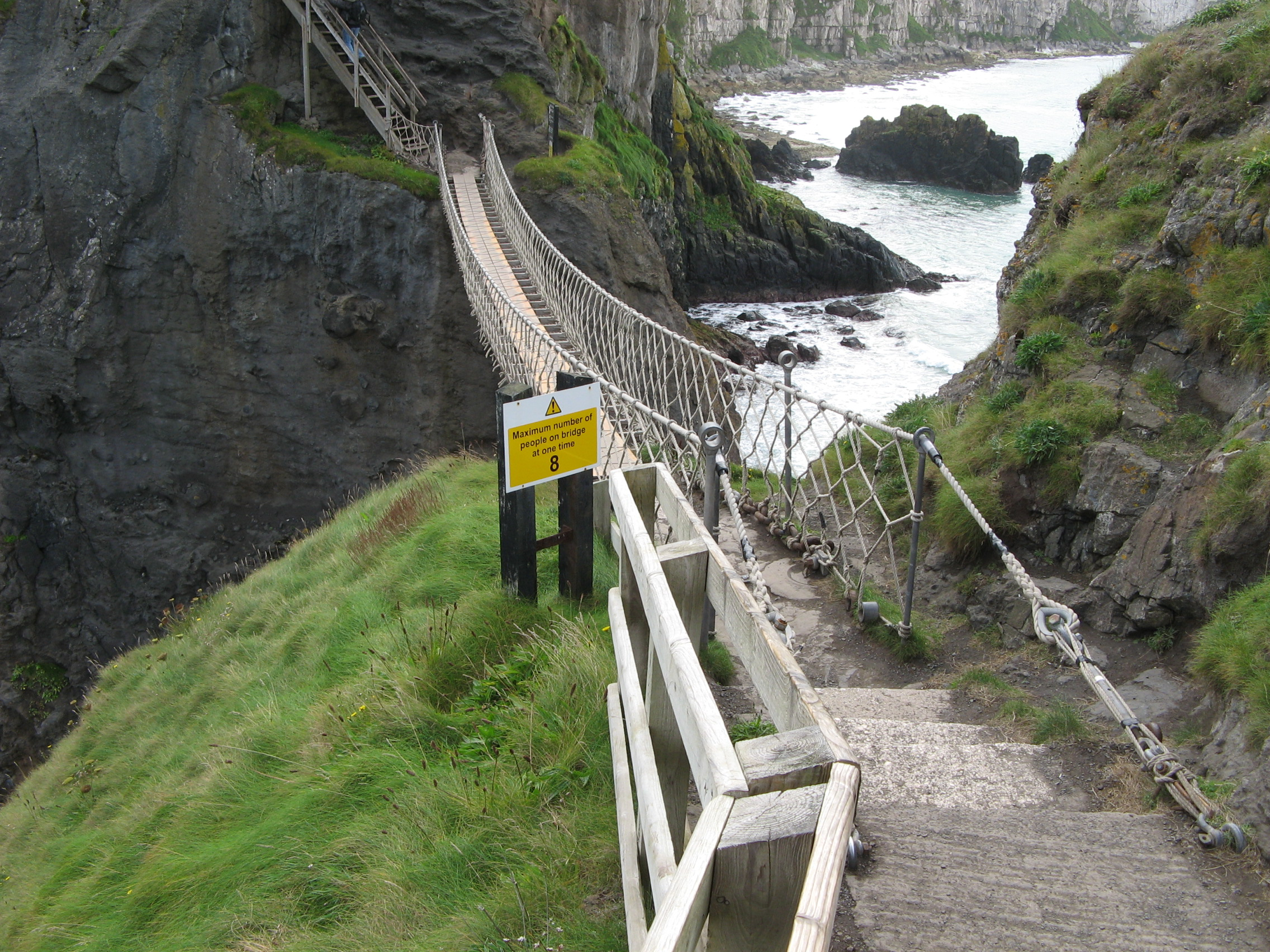
Carrick-a-Rede Rope Bridge, 2007

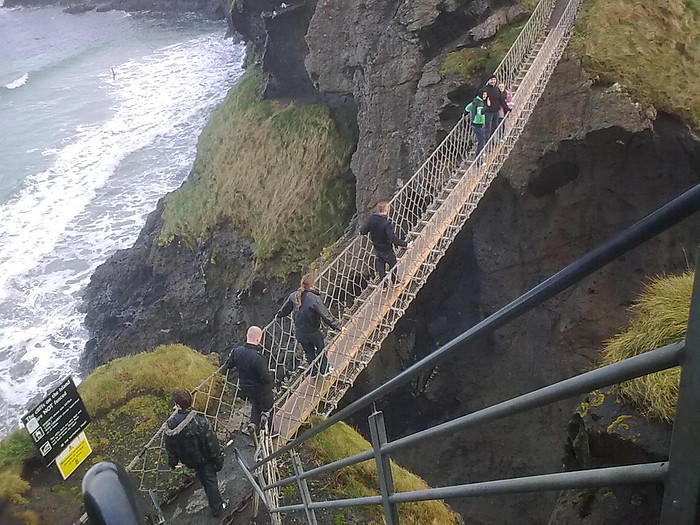
Bridge in use 2010

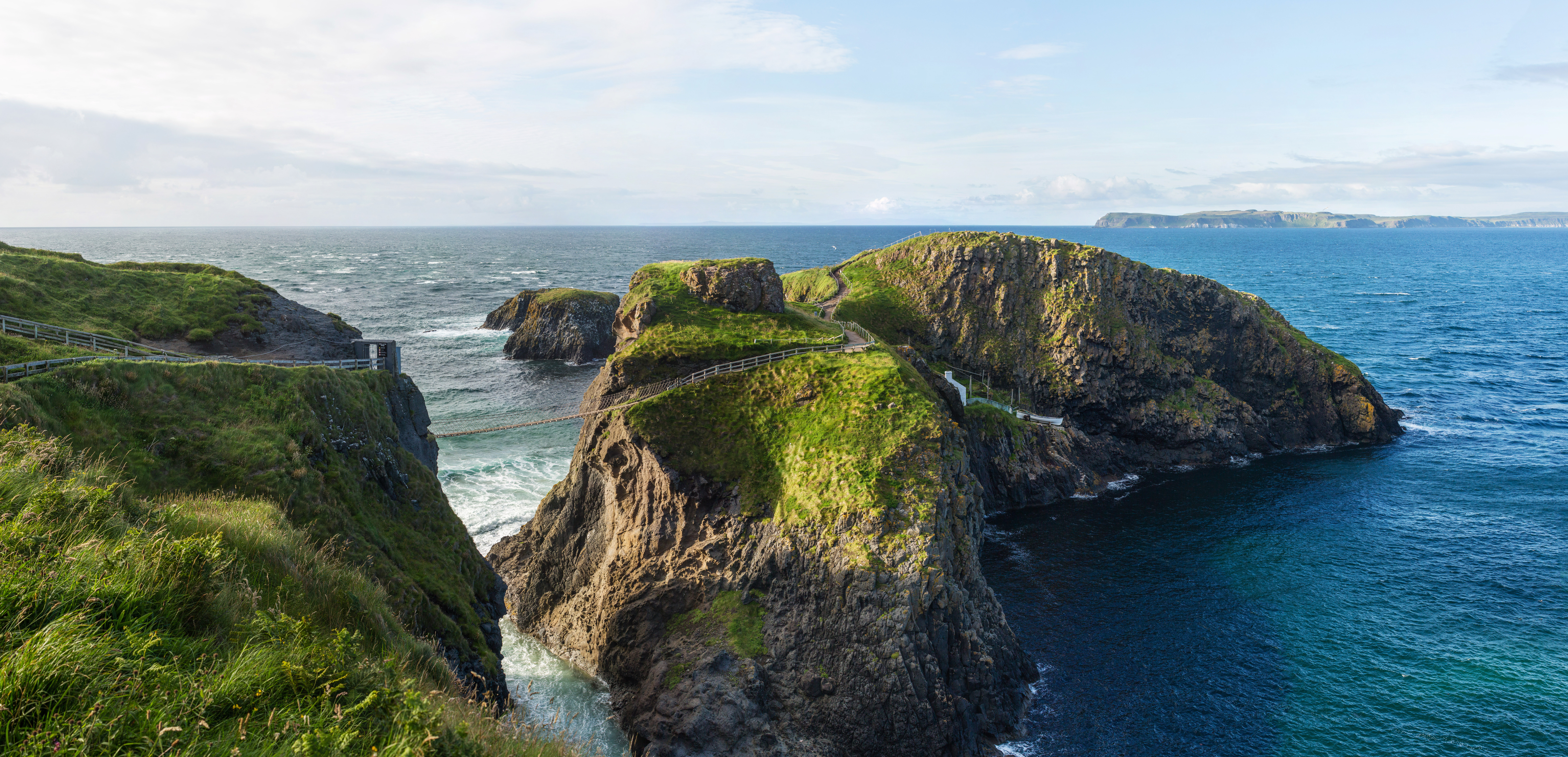
View of the bridge and island

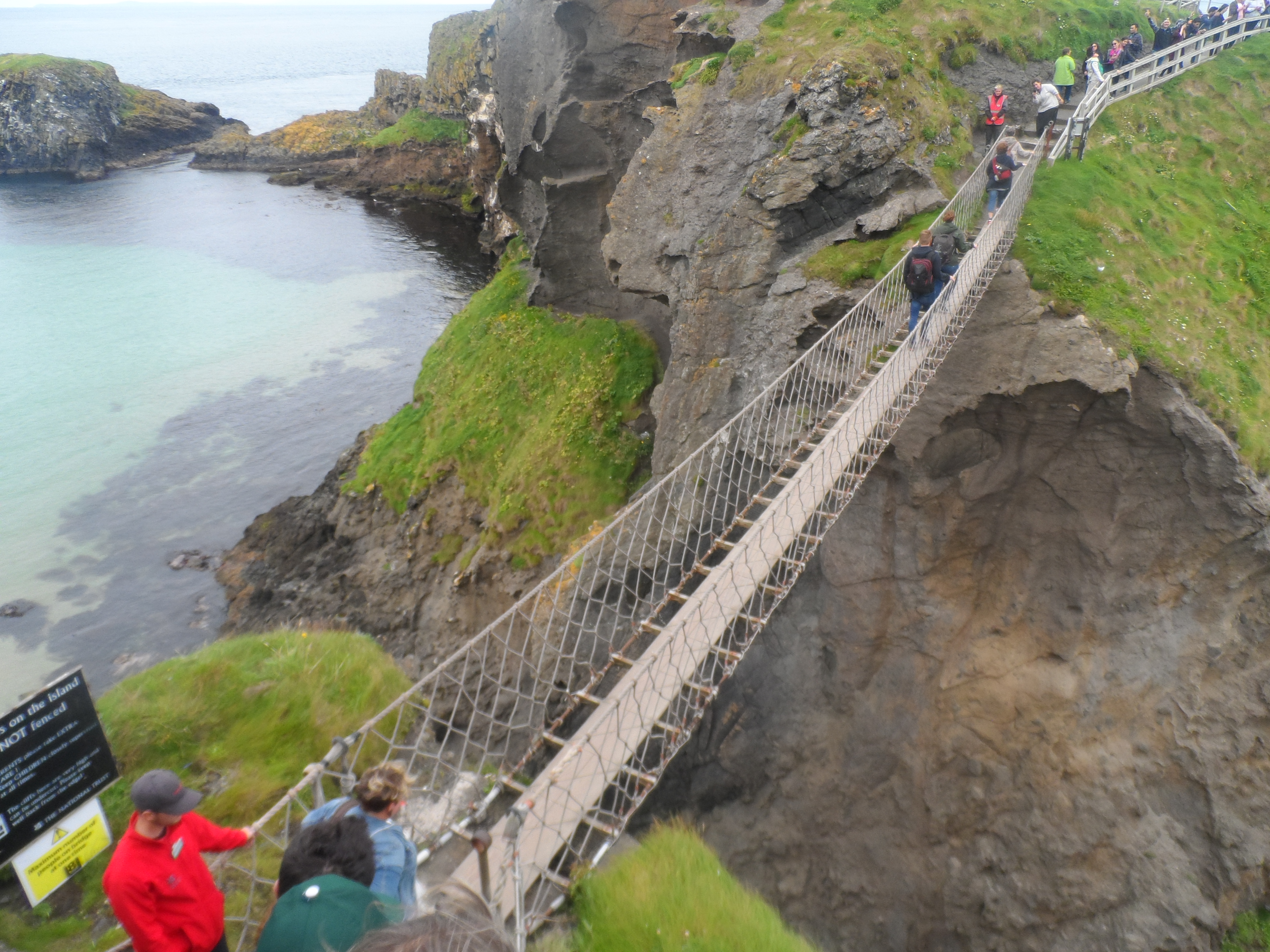
The bridge in 2017

== See also ==
- List of notable pedestrian bridges
- List of tourist attractions in Ireland
