= Ballintoy =

Village in County Antrim, Northern Ireland

Coordinates: 55°14′N 6°21′W

Ballintoy: Irish: Baile an Tuaigh
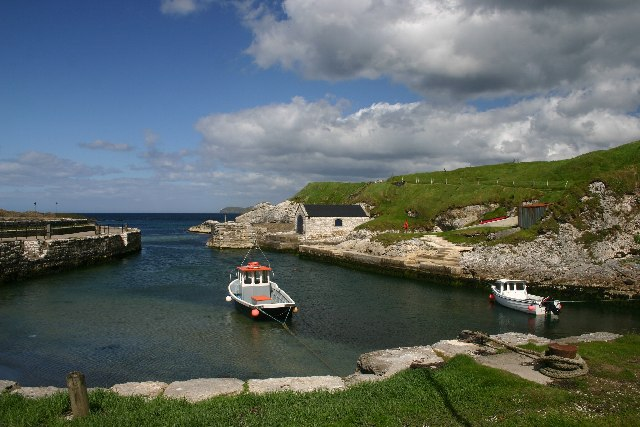
- Ballintoy harbour

- Location within Northern Ireland
- Population: 140 (2021 census)
- District: Causeway Coast and Glens
- County: County Antrim
- Country: Northern Ireland
- Sovereign state: United Kingdom
- Post town: BALLYCASTLE
- Postcode district: BT54
- Post town: BUSHMILLS
- Postcode district: BT57
- Dialling code: 028
- UK Parliament: North Antrim
- NI Assembly: North Antrim

Ballintoy (from Irish Baile an Tuaigh 'the northern townland') is a small village, townland (of 274 acres or 111 hectares) and civil parish in County Antrim, Northern Ireland. It is alongside the B15 coast road, 28 km (17 mi) north-east of Coleraine, eight kilometres (five miles) west of Ballycastle and between it and Bushmills. It is in the historic barony of Cary. The village lies about one kilometre from Ballintoy Harbour, a small fishing harbour at the end of a very small, narrow, steep road down Knocksaughey hill which passes by the entrance to Larrybane and Carrick-a-Rede Rope Bridge. The harbour is host to a dawn service on Easter Sunday each year.

== Amenities ==
Ballintoy's population was recorded at 140 people in the 2021 census.

The village has commercial and social facilities including tourist accommodation, restaurants, several small shops, and two churches. The distinctive white Ballintoy Parish Church sits on the hill above the harbour. The village was originally built around a single street separating the inland pastures from the strip fields running towards the sea. Two of the village's oldest hotels and pubs, the Carrick-A-Rede Hotel and the Fullerton Arms, still stand on this street. The village is in the area covered by Causeway Coast and Glens Borough Council.

In 2011, some residents objected to the erection of bilingual street signs in English and Irish in a petition sent to Moyle District Council after an application was requested for an English/Irish sign at Harbour Road opposite the local Church of Ireland church.

== Game of Thrones ==
The village was used for the fictional town of Lordsport in the Isle of Pyke during the second season of HBO's medieval fantasy television series Game of Thrones. Filming took place during August 2011.

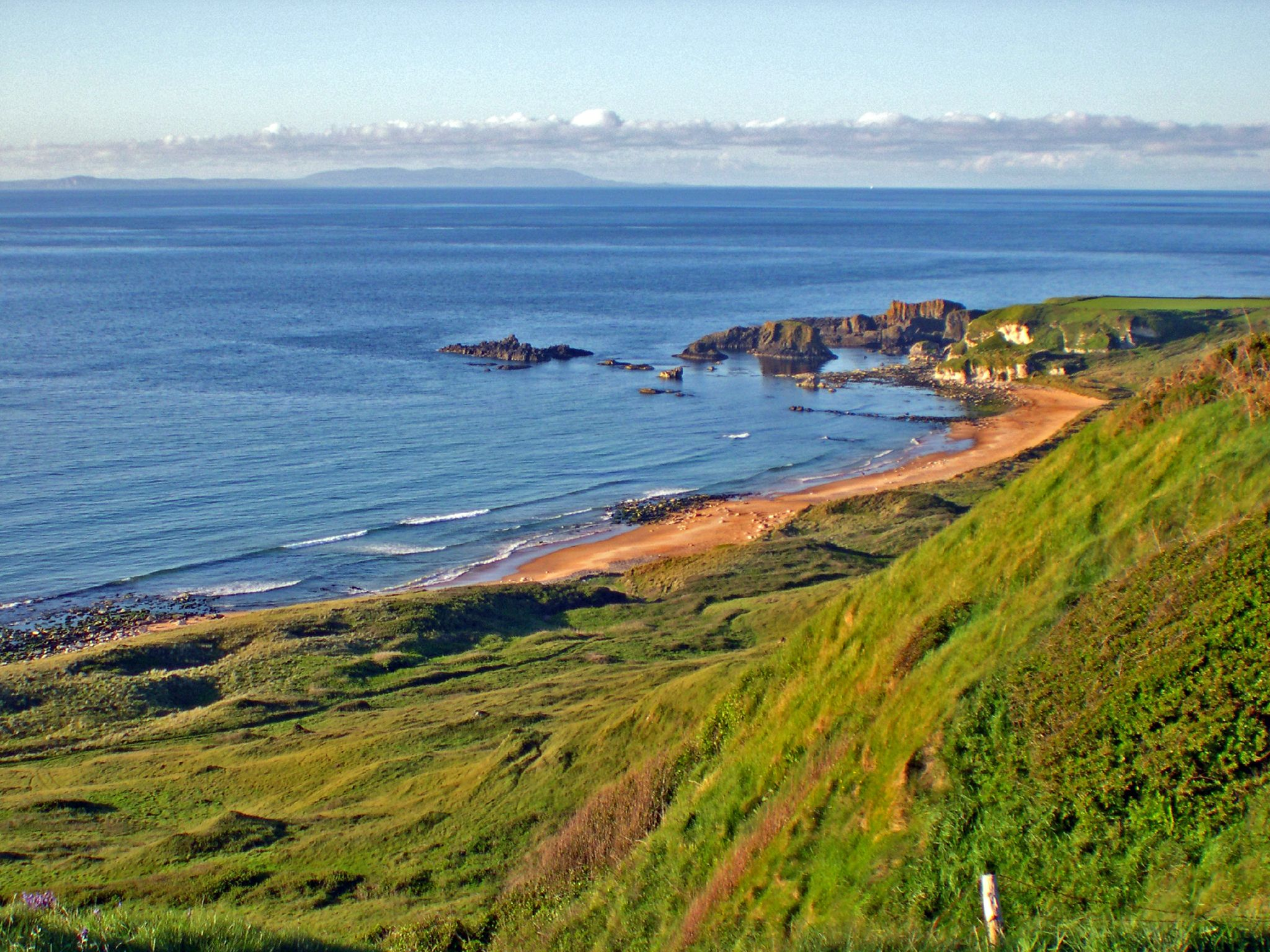
Beach at Ballintoy

== Places of interest ==
- Bendhu House is a listed building on the road to the harbour and was built by the artist Newton Penprase.
- Dunseverick Castle lies in ruins near the village, and is a short drive from the Giant's Causeway.
- Carrick-a-Rede Rope Bridge is just outside the village. The bridge links the mainland to the tiny Carrick Island. It is thought salmon fishermen have been erecting bridges to the island for over 300 years. The bridge spans 20 m (66 ft) and is 30 m (98 ft) above the rocks below.
- Sheep Island, County Antrim is off the north coast.
- Ballintoy Parish Church was built in 1813 and incorporates the tower of the older church.

== Civil parish of Ballintoy ==
The civil parish contains the following townlands:

- Araboy
- Artimacorkick
- Ballinlea Lower
- Ballinlea Upper
- Ballintoy
- Ballintoy Demesne
- Ballynastraid
- Broughgammon
- Carnlelis
- Carrowcroey
- Clegnagh
- Cloghcorr
- Coolmaghra
- Craig
- Craigalappan
- Craiganee
- Croaghbeg
- Croaghmore
- Curramoney
- Currysheskin
- Drumnagee
- Drumnagessan
- Glenstaghey
- Island Macallan
- Kilmahamogue
- Knocknagarvan
- Knocksoghey
- Lagavara
- Lemnagh Beg
- Lemnagh More
- Lisbellanagroagh Beg
- Lisbellanagroagh More
- Magheraboy
- Magheracashel
- Maghernahar
- Prolusk
- Templastragh
- Toberkeagh
- White Park

== See also ==
- List of towns and villages in Northern Ireland
- List of civil parishes of County Antrim
- List of townlands of County Antrim
