= White Park Bay =

Beach in Country Antrim, Northern Ireland

Coordinates: 55°13′56″N 6°24′17″W

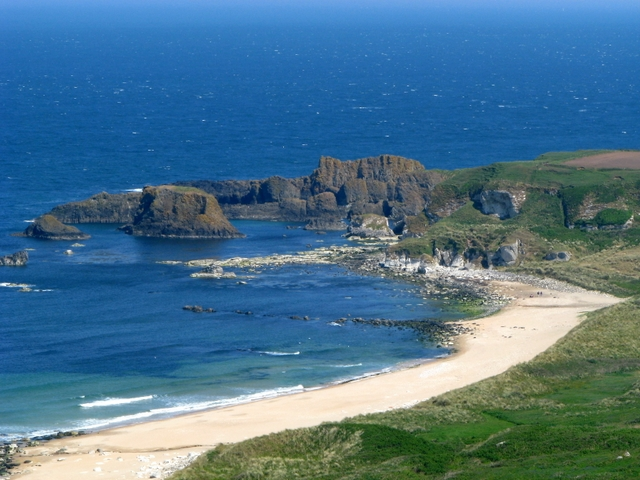
White Park Bay in 2008

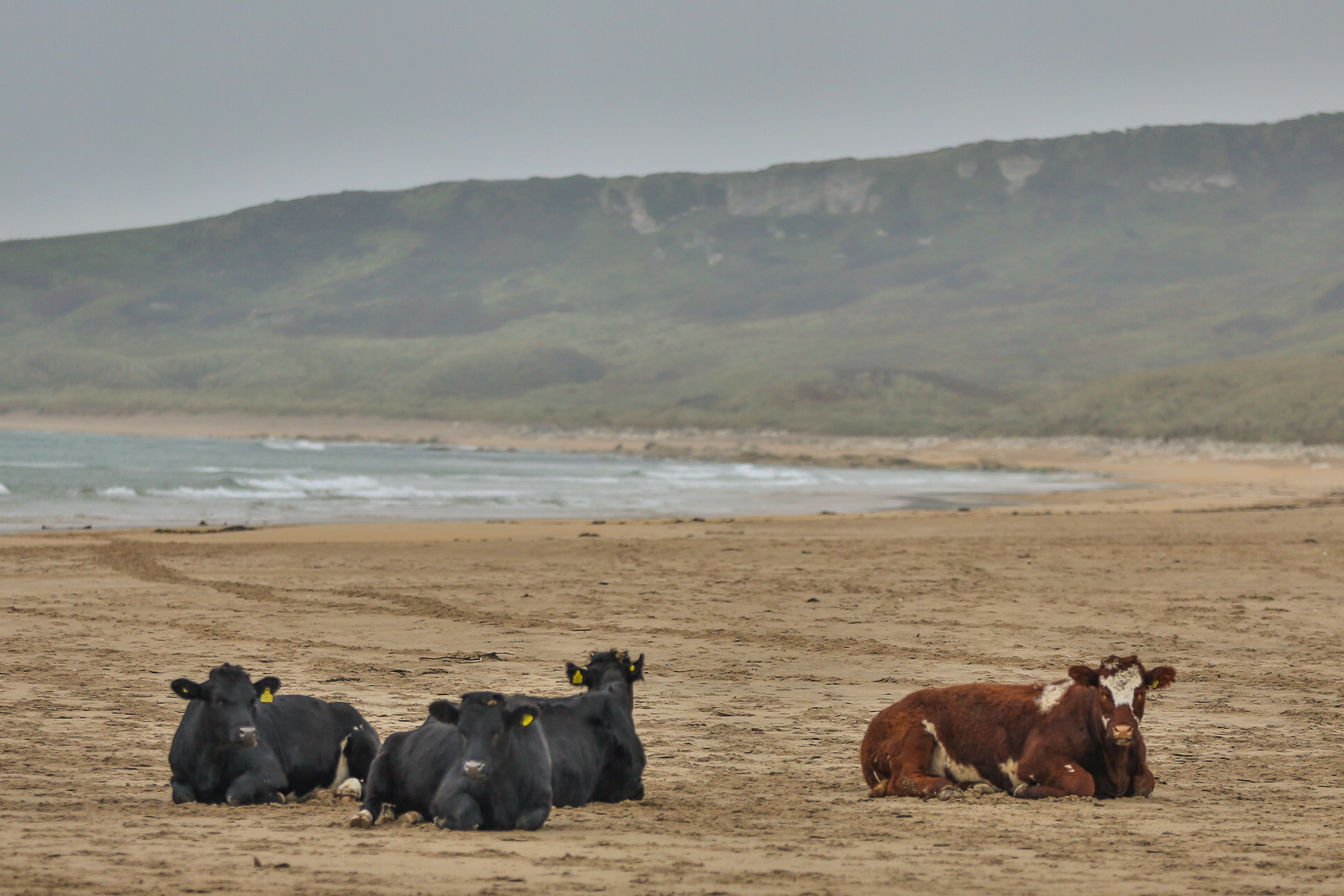
Cows rest along White Park Bay beach on the Antrim Coast of Northern Ireland.

White Park Bay (also spelled Whitepark Bay) is a bay and three-mile long beach located near Ballycastle, County Antrim, on the north coast of Northern Ireland, along the Giant’s Causeway Coastal Route. Sheep and cattle graze the hills and beach along the bay, which has been under the care of the National Trust for Places of Historic Interest or Natural Beauty since 1938. It is situated in the townland of White Park (likely from the Irish An Pháirc), which is 170 acres in area and located in the civil parish of Ballintoy. White Park Bay is home to the Whitepark Bay Youth Hostel. The beach is unsuitable for swimming due to rip currents.

A cairn above the beach is designated as a Scheduled Historic Monument at grid ref: D0225 4403.

== Geology ==
In terms of evidence of the area's geological past, the cliffs on both the west and east sides of Whitepark Bay are composed of Upper Cretaceous (Santonian- lower Maastrichtian) chalk. The chalk itself is a form of limestone composed almost entirely of Calcium Carbonate. This chalk formed late during the Cretaceous period, a time when many marine transgressions took place, and much of the continents were under water - as was Ireland. The cliffs at White Park Bay contain fragments of the belemnite, Belemnitella mucronata. Belemnitella was one of the latest surviving Belemnites. Belemnites, a distinctive fossil important for zonation and biostratigraphy of Mesozoic marine deposits, were related to today's modern Coleoid Cephalopods, looked superficially similar to squid, and possessed hundreds of hooks on each of their arms which they used presumably to catch their prey of other small marine creatures.

== See also ==
- Ballycastle, County Antrim
