= White Park cattle =

Breed of cattle

White Park
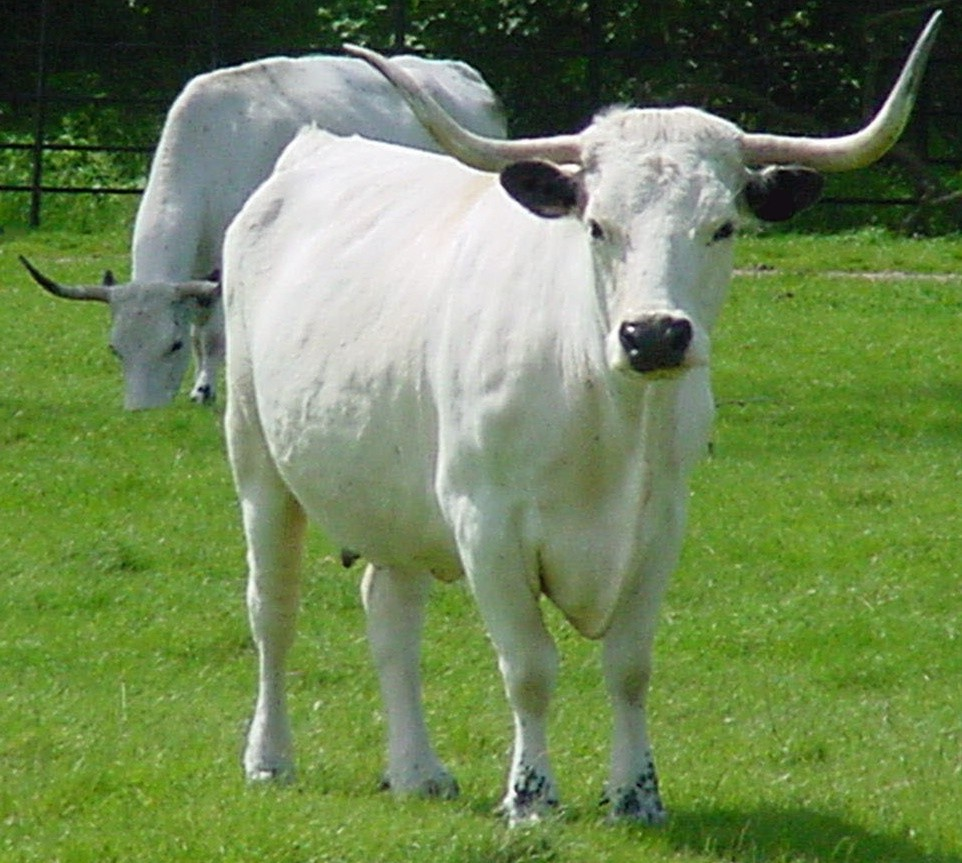
- Conservation status: FAO (2007): not at risk; RBST (2021–2022): at risk; DAD-IS (2023): at risk/endangered
- Country of origin: United Kingdom
- Distribution: Australia; Canada; United Kingdom; United States
- Use: beef

Traits
- Weight: Male: 800-1000kg; Female: 500-700kg
- Coat: colour-pointed – white with black or red points
- Horn status: horned
- Cattle; Bos (primigenius) taurus

The White Park is a modern British breed of cattle. It was established in 1973 to include several herds or populations of colour-pointed white cattle – white-coated, with points of either red or black on the ears and feet. Such cattle have a long history in the British Isles, and the origins of some herds go back to the Middle Ages.

In the twenty-first century it is an endangered breed, and in 2023 was listed as 'at risk' on the watchlist of the Rare Breeds Survival Trust. Two semi-feral populations of these cattle were later given separate breed status as the Chillingham Wild Cattle in Northumbria and the Vaynol herd from Gwynedd in North Wales, .

In the United States it is known as the Ancient White Park; the American White Park is a different breed.

== History ==
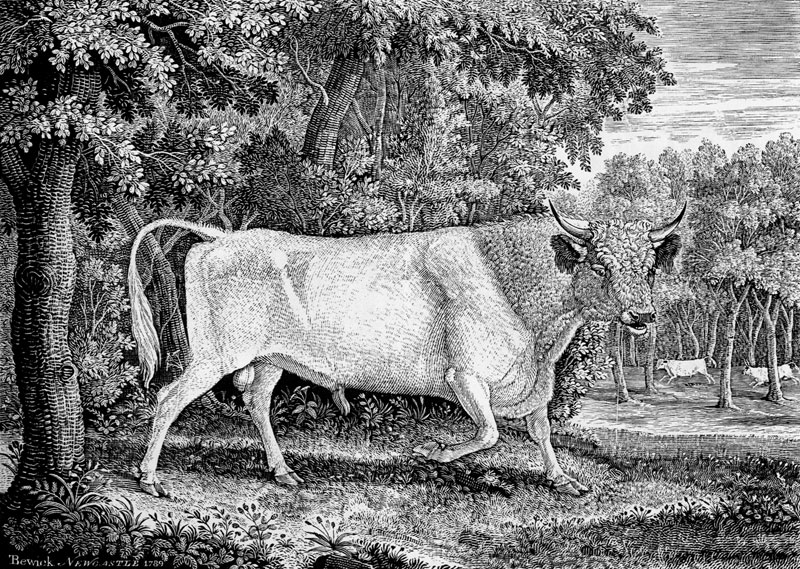
Wood engraving by Thomas Bewick of a Chillingham Bull, 1789

In 1225, as a result of legislation passed by Henry III, several parks were enclosed and several herds, including those at Chartley and Chillingham in England, and Cadzow in Scotland, were "emparked". There were more than a dozen white Park Cattle herds in Britain in the early 19th century, but most of these were exterminated by the turn of the next century.

The Park Cattle registration programme in Britain was started in the early 1900s, but by 1946 only the Dynevor, Woburn, Whipsnade, and Cadzow herds survived as domesticated herds; the ancient herds at Vaynol (Faenol) and Chillingham having become semi-feral. Registration of White Park Cattle ceased during the Second World War, and recommenced after the formation of the Rare Breeds Survival Trust in 1973. Numbers have increased and now exceed 1000 breeding cows in the UK..

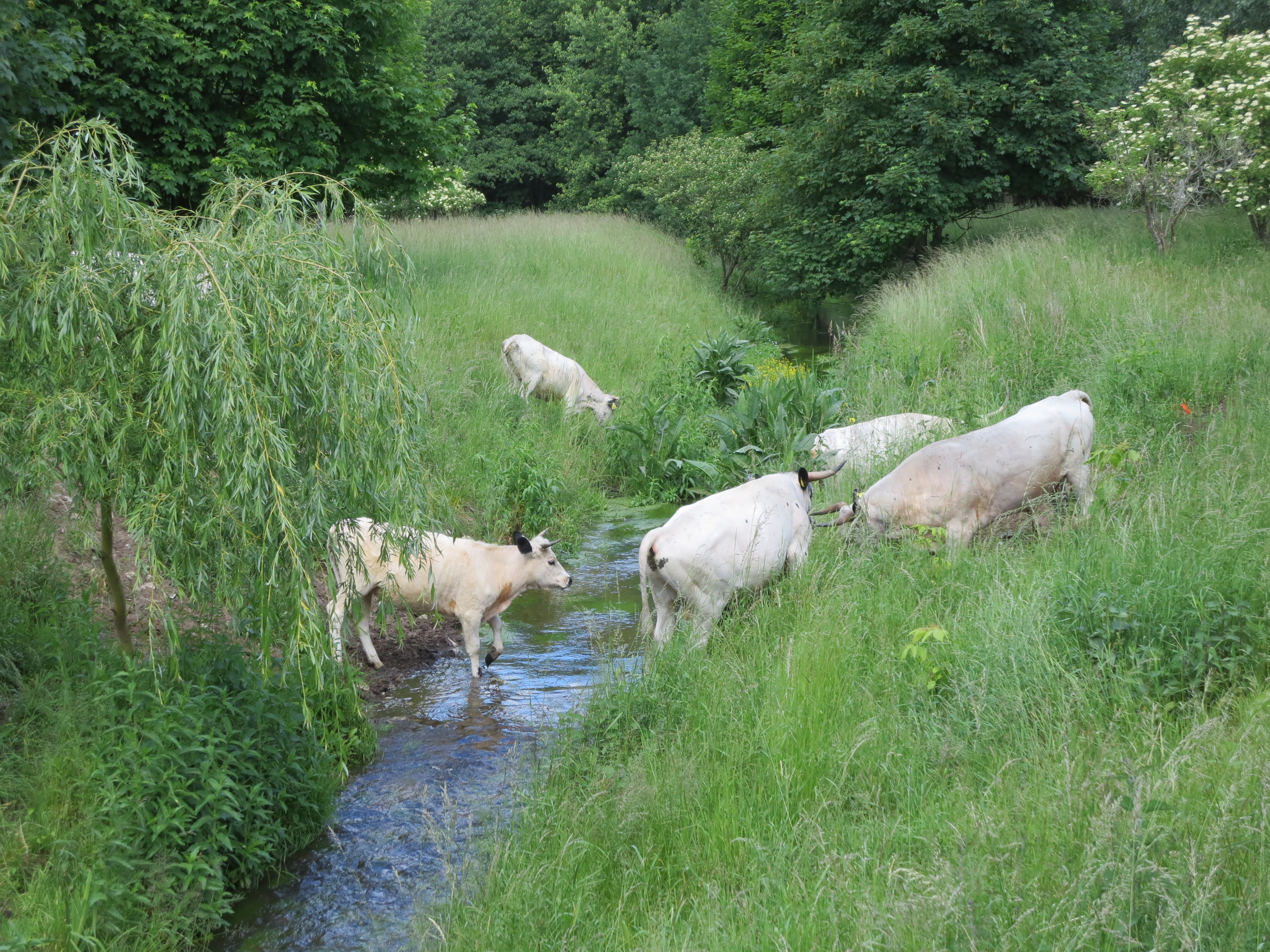
In the Karower Teiche reserve in north-east Berlin, Germany

White Park cattle have been exported to several countries. In 1921, animals were exported to Denmark, and from there to Latvia in 1935 and thence to Germany in 1972. In 1987, cattle were exported to Australia. In 1940, one or two pairs of cattle from the Cadzow herd were exported to Canada. Some of their Canadian-born offspring were transferred to the Bronx Zoo, and later moved to the King Ranch in Texas, where they remained for nearly forty years. In the United States the breed is known as the Ancient White Park to distinguish from the hornless American White Park, a population of the British White. The genesis of a herd has been established in New Zealand. Fertile embryos were imported in 2014 for IVF to donor cows. The birthed White Park females provided additional eggs for a second round of IVF.

Most national populations of White Park cattle have been DNA tested to verify parentage, to confirm the provenance of products, and to enable assignment of applicant animals to breed and determine the optimum breeding programme to ensure their effective conservation survival. The breeding programme in the UK aims to increase the desirable characteristics of the breed while maintaining genetic diversity, as heterogeneity is low due to inbreeding through much of the twentieth century. Faygate Brace (born 1906) contributed c. 40% of the ancestry of the breed by the 1940s, and Whipsnade 281 (born 1956) repeated this pattern in the second half of the twentieth century. His grandson, Dynevor Torpedo is now the dominant influence in the breed. Two herds, Dynevor and Chartley/Woburn, have been the dominant influences throughout this time. The global population now is almost 2,000 purebred females, plus bulls and young stock.

In 2013 a small herd was moved for conservation reasons to the Isle of Man.

In 2023 the breed was reported to DAD-IS by four countries – Australia (where it may be extinct), Canada, the United Kingdom and the United States.

== Characteristics ==
The White Park is a medium-large, long-bodied bovine. A programme of linear assessment, including 200 bulls and 300 cows, has been carried out in the UK since 1994 to define its size and conformation. The weight of a mature bull varies from 800 to 1,000 kilograms (1,800 to 2,200 lb), depending on the quality of grazing, while adult cows are typically 500 to 700 kilograms (1,100 to 1,500 lb). Their coloration is a distinctive porcelain white with coloured (black or red) points. The horns of the cows can vary in shape, but the majority grow forwards and upwards in a graceful curve. The horns of the bulls are thicker and shorter. In their native environment in Britain, White Park cattle are known for their distinctive appearance and their grazing preference for coarse terrain. White Park cattle are well-suited to non-intensive production. Some herds are kept outside throughout the year on rough upland grazing without shelter or supplementary feed. They are docile, easy-calving, and have a long productive life. Some traits may vary depending on their location.

Until recently, White Park cattle were a triple-purpose breed used for meat, milk and draught. The 3rd Lord Dynevor (1765–1852) kept a team of draught oxen, and the practice continued up to 1914. They were used as dairy cattle even more recently. Some cows were being milked in the Dynevor herd in 1951, but yields were moderate. Beef became the main product during the twentieth century, and gained a reputation as a textured meat, with excellent flavour and marbling, which commanded a significant premium in speciality markets.

The white park, a breed I’ve never eaten before and had always assumed was purely ornamental, was really excellent: softly chewy, with that strong, distinctive, almost corrupt flavour of proper beef

— A.A. Gill, Table Talk: Sweet and Sour, Salt and Bitter

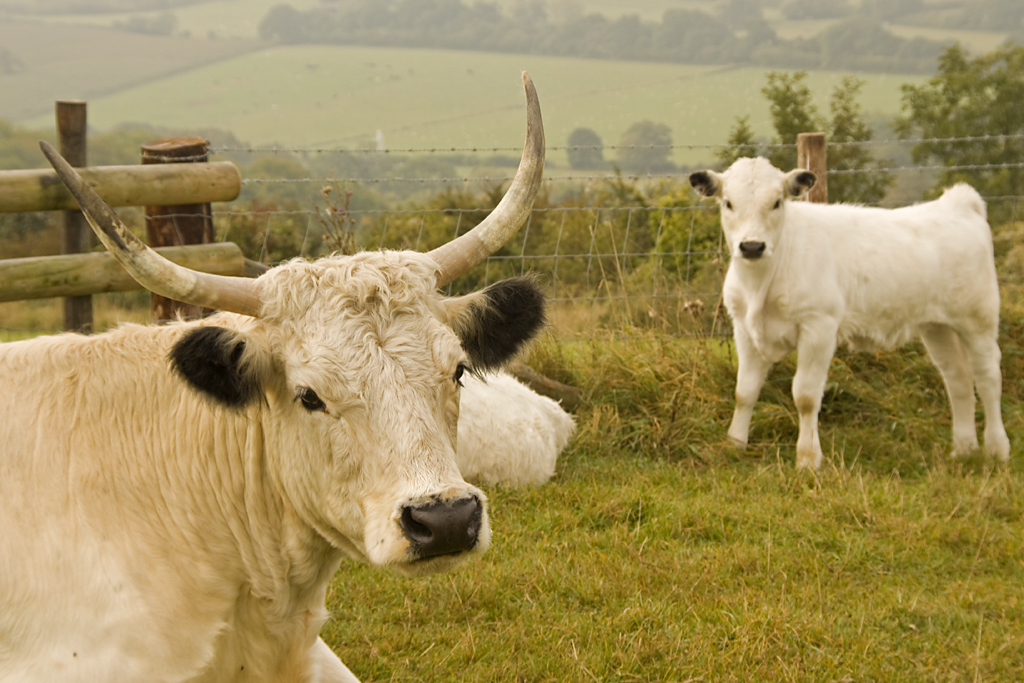
Cow and calf on Hambledon Hill in England

Studies of blood type polymorphisms have found the White Park to be fairly distant from other British cattle breeds, and closest to the Scottish Highland.

The colour-pointed coat pattern also appears in other cattle breeds such as the Irish Moiled, the Blanco Orejinegro, the Berrenda, the Nguni and the Texas Longhorn.
