= Berrenda cattle =

Breed of cattle

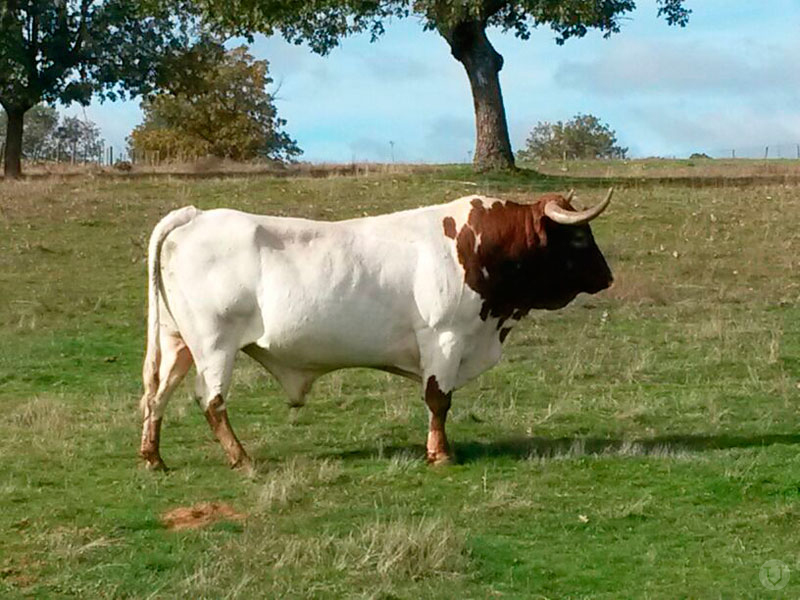
Red Berrenda bull

The Berrenda is a type of cattle from the Spanish region of Andalusia. It is subdivided into two breeds; the Red Berrenda and the Black Berrenda. Both breeds are rustic and very well adapted to the environment. Both breeds were considered endangered as of 2022.

The cattle are susceptible to Robertsonian translocation, which impacts their ability to reproduce. As a result farmers have been attempting to implement breeding strategies to address the chromosomal abnormality.

== See also ==
- List of Spanish cattle breeds
