= Tide clock =

Specially designed clock that keeps track of the Moon's apparent motion around the Earth

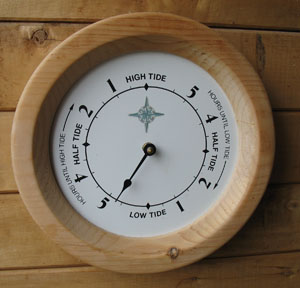
Tide clock

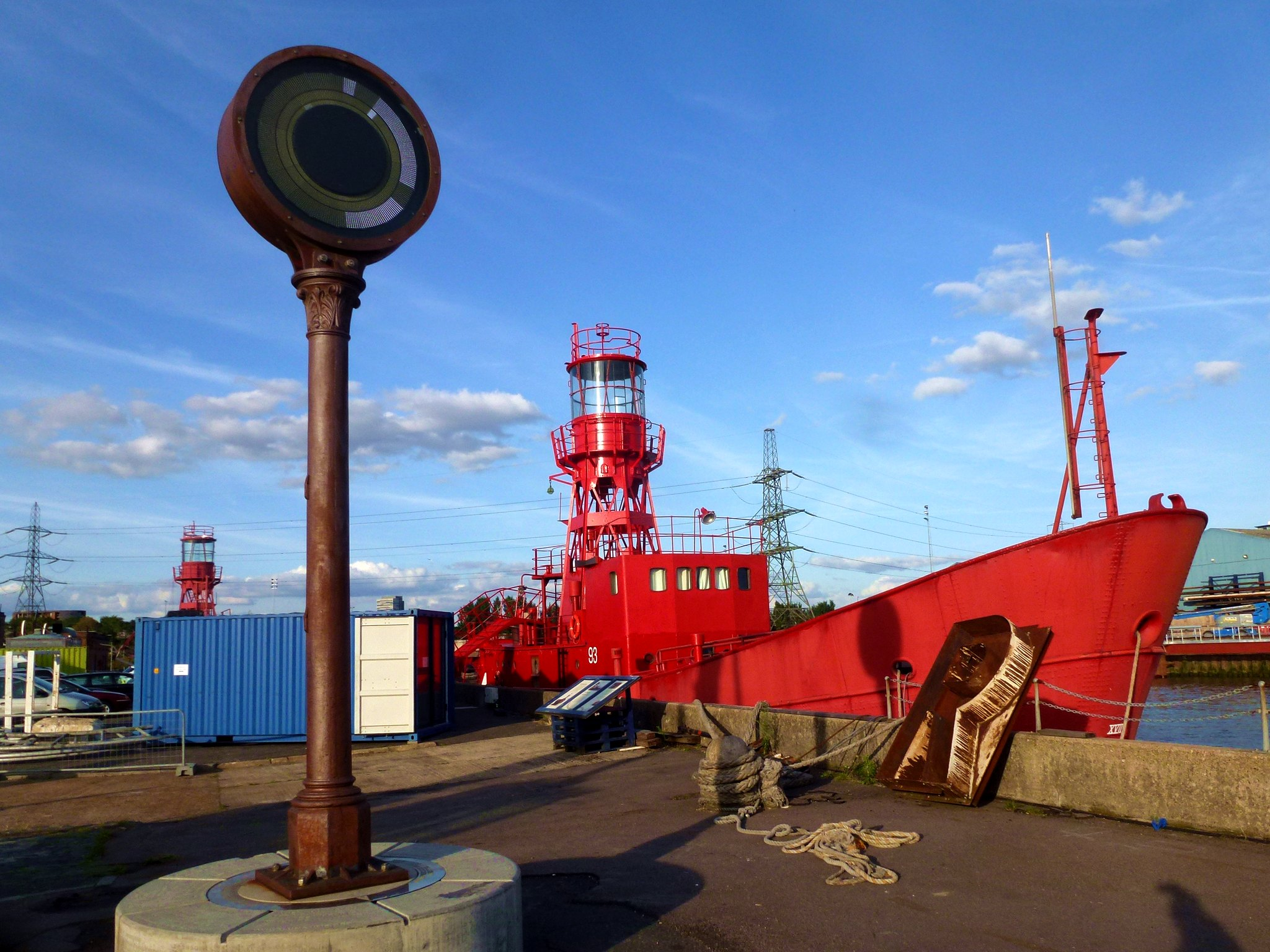
Tide clock Alunatime at Trinity Buoy Wharf, London

A tide clock is a specially designed clock that keeps track of the Moon's apparent motion around the Earth. Along many coastlines, the Moon contributes the major part (67%) of the combined lunar and solar tides. The exact interval between tides is influenced by the position of the Moon and Sun relative to the Earth, as well as the specific location on Earth where the tide is being measured. Due to the Moon's orbital prograde motion, it takes a particular point on the Earth (on average) 24 hours and 50.5 minutes to rotate under the Moon, so the time between high lunar tides fluctuates between 12 and 13 hours. A tide clock is divided into two roughly 6 hour tidal periods that show the average length of time between high and low tides in a semi-diurnal tide region, such as most areas of the Atlantic Ocean.

== Traditional mechanical tide clocks ==
The bottom of the tide clock dial (6 o'clock position) is marked "low tide" and the top of the tide clock dial (12 o'clock position) is marked "high tide." The left side of the dial is marked "hours until high tide" and has a count-down of hours from 5 to 1. There is one hand on the clock face, and along the left side it points to the number of hours "until" the (lunar) high tide. The right hand side of the clock is marked "hours until low tide" and has a count-down of hours from 5 to 1. The number pointed to by the hand gives the time "until" the (lunar) low tide. Some tide clocks incorporate time (using standard quartz movement) and even humidity and temperature in the same instrument.

Some tide clocks count down the number of hours from high or low tide, as in "one hour past high or low tide". When the clock reaches the halfway point ("half-tide"), it then counts the hours up to high tide or low tide, as in "one hour until high or low tide". Generally, there is an adjustment knob on the back on the instrument which may be used to set the tide using official tide tables for a specific location at either high or low tide.

Tides have an inherent lead or lag, known as the lunitidal interval, that is different at every location, so tidal clocks are set for the time when the local lunar high tide occurs. This is often complicated because the lead or lag varies during the course of the lunar month, as the lunar and solar tides fall into and out of synchronization. The lunar tide and solar tide are synchronized (ebb and flow at the same time) near the full moon and the new moon. The two tides are unsynchronized near the first and last quarter moon (or "half moon"). Also, in addition to the relative position of the moon and the elliptical pattern of the sun, the tide can be affected to some degree by wind and atmospheric pressure. All of these variables have less impact on the tide at the time of the full moon, so this is usually the best time to set a tide clock. If the tide clock is mounted on a moving boat, it will need to be reset more frequently. The best time to set the clock is at the new moon or the full moon, which is also when the clock can most reliably indicate the actual combined tide. A simple tide clock will always be least reliable near the quarter moon.

Tide range is the vertical distance between the highest high tide and lowest low tide. The size of the lunar tide compared to the solar tide (which comes once every 12 hours) is generally about 2 to 1, but the actual proportion along any particular shore depends on the location, orientation, and shape of the local bay or estuary. Along some shorelines, the solar tide is the only important tide, and ordinary 12-hour clocks suffice since the high and low tides come at nearly the same time every day. Because ordinary tidal clocks only track a part of the tidal effect, and because the relative size of the combined effects is different in different places, they are in general only partially accurate for tracking the tides. Consequently, all navigators use tide tables either in a booklet, computer or digital tide clock.

Analog tide clocks are most accurate for use on the Atlantic coasts of America and Europe. This is because along the Atlantic coastline the moon controls the tides predictably, ebbing and flowing on a regular (12- to 13-hour) schedule. However, in other parts of the world such as along the Pacific Coast, tides can be irregular. The Pacific Ocean is so vast that the moon cannot control the entire ocean at once. The result is that parts of the Pacific Coast can have 3 low tides a day. Similarly, there are areas in the world like the Gulf of Mexico or the South China Sea that have only one high tide a day. Mechanical tide clocks used on the Pacific Coast must be adjusted frequently, often as much as weekly, and are not useful in diurnal areas (those with one tide per day).

== Digital tide clocks ==
Digital tide clocks are not married to the 24 hour 50.5 minute tide cycle and thus track tides beyond the Atlantic coast. Smart digital tide clocks can work across all locations in North America without any adjustments. This is achieved by storing all the variations of tides at numerous locations. Given a particular location and date/time, a digital tide clock can display the previous tide, next tide and current absolute tide height. Thus, they are able to track semi-diurnal, diurnal and mixed diurnal tides.

== Public clocks with tide indications ==
Belgium

- Lier. The Zimmer tower's astronomical clock has twelve dials surrounding a central clockface. The dial at position X indicates the tides at Lier: the flag without a pennant, at the top of the dial, indicates high water; the flag with a pennant above indicates rising water, the flag with a pennant below indicates ebbing water. The size of the ships indicates the level of the tide.

France

- Fécamp. The clock of 1667 at Fécamp Abbey shows the time of local high tide, and the present state of the sea by means of a disc with a quarter-circle aperture which rotates with the lunar phase, revealing a green background at the syzygies (at new moon and full moon), when the tidal range is most extreme ("spring tides"), and a black background at times of smaller tidal range ("neap tides").

Netherlands

- Arnemuiden. The 16th-century church clock at Arnemuiden indicates the time of local high tide as a pointer on a 12-hour clockface.
- Maassluis. Jacob Venker's tide clock on the exterior of the Nationaal Sleepvaart Museum was installed in 1996. Despite the clock's traditional dial, it is computer-controlled, and accounts for 94 waves in its tidal timekeeping.

United Kingdom

- King's Lynn. The south tower of King's Lynn Minster houses a tide clock, a 20th-century restoration of the original installed by Thomas Tue in 1681, which shows the moon phase and the time of local high tide, indicated by a dragon hand. The dial reads "LYNN HIGH TIDE" clockwise, but is to be interpreted as a 24-hour dial, with "L" at the top of the dial as midday and "G" at the bottom of the dial as midnight.
- London. Alunatime (image above) at Trinity Buoy Wharf is a tide clock designed by artist Laura Williams, installed in 2010, which indicates the lunar phase, lunar day and tide cycle using a graphical notation of lights.
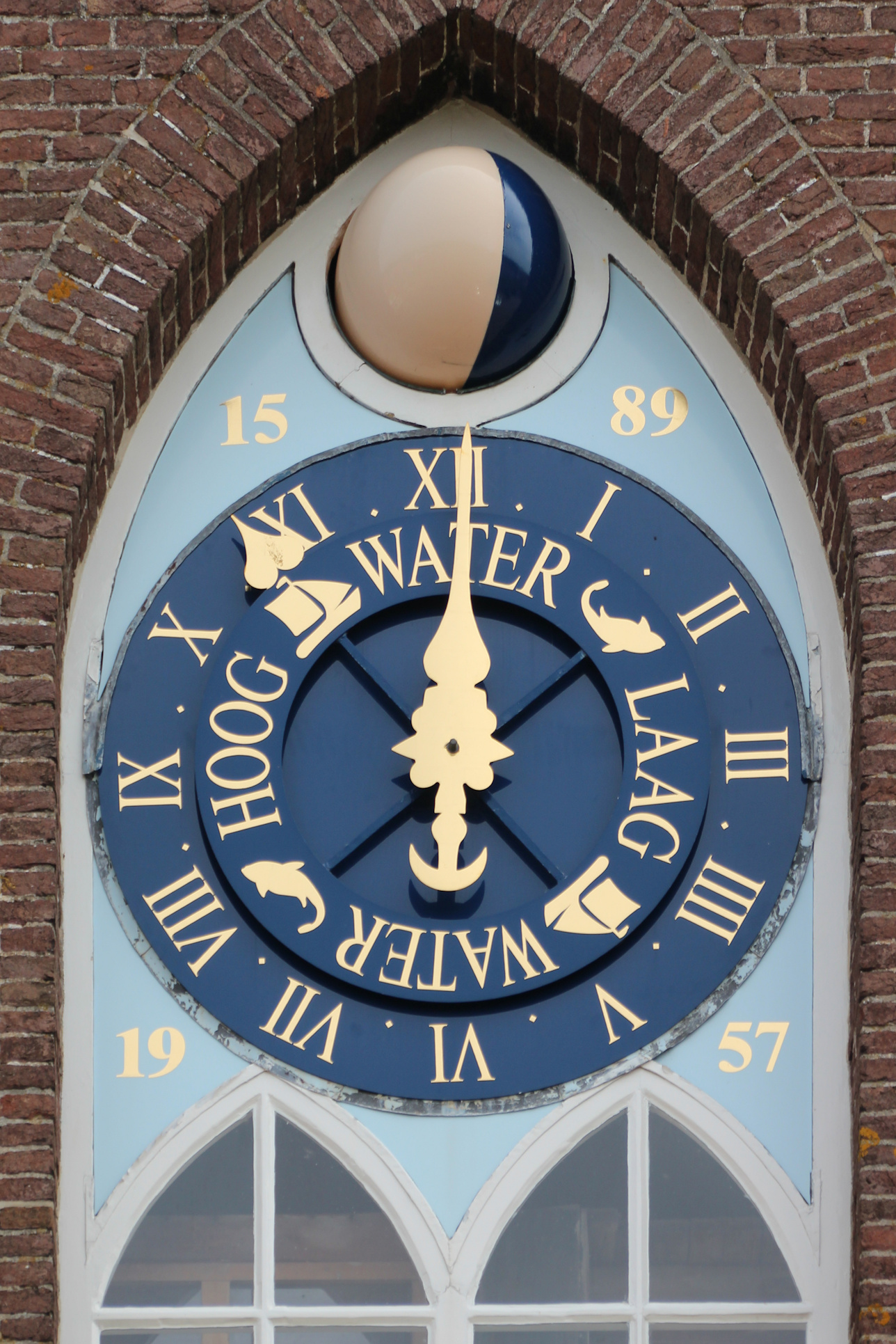
Arnemuiden

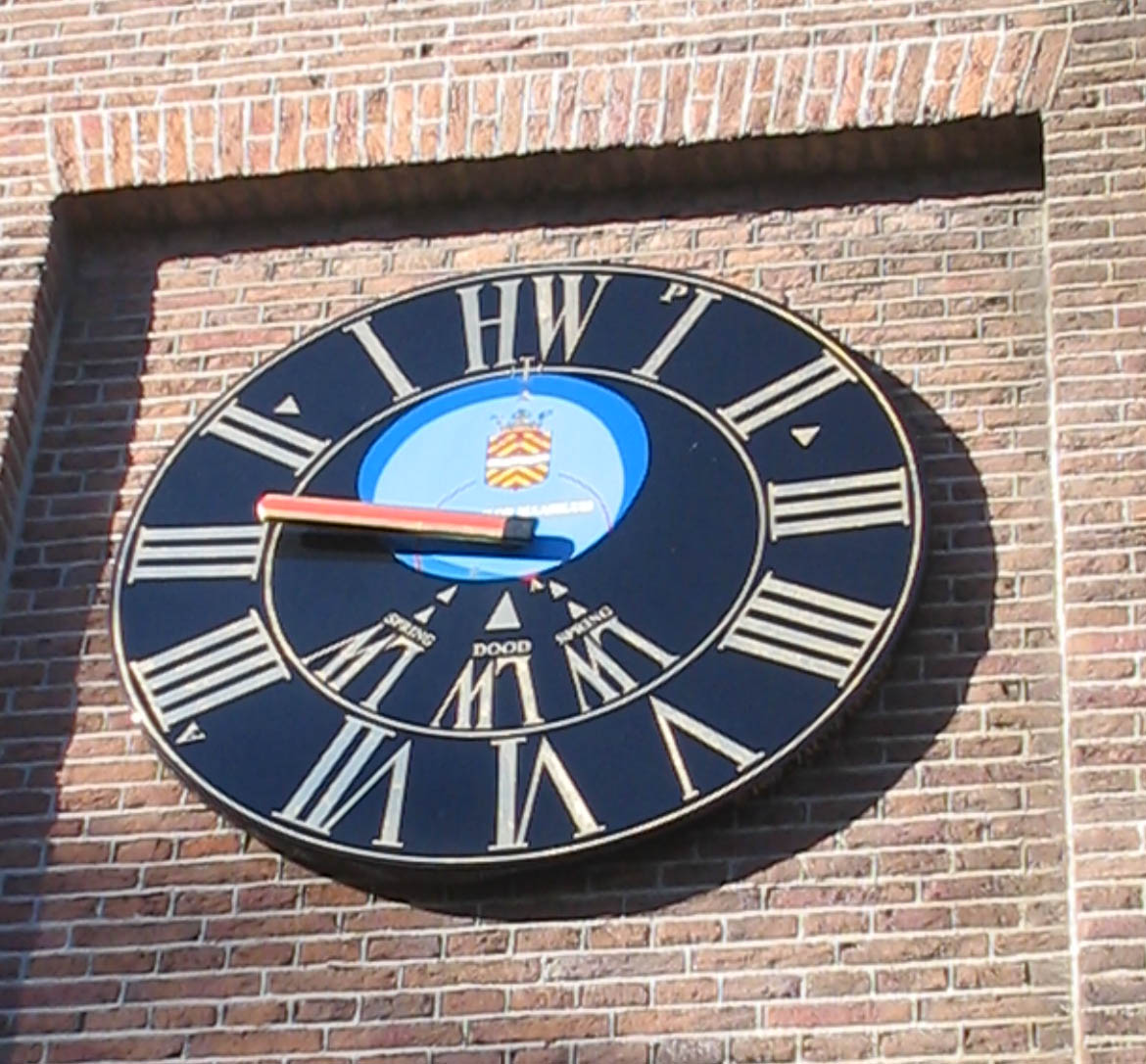
Maassluis

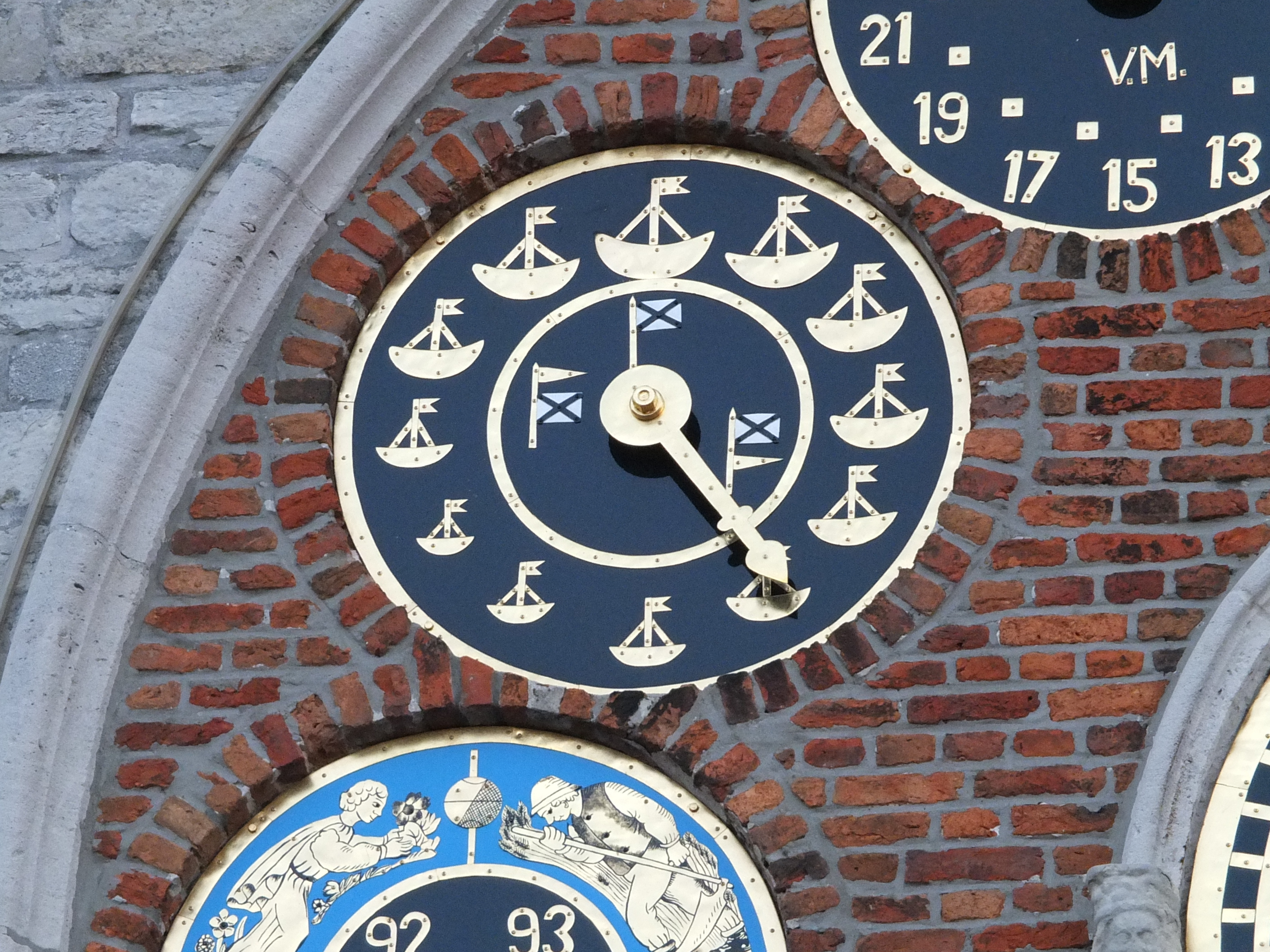
Lier

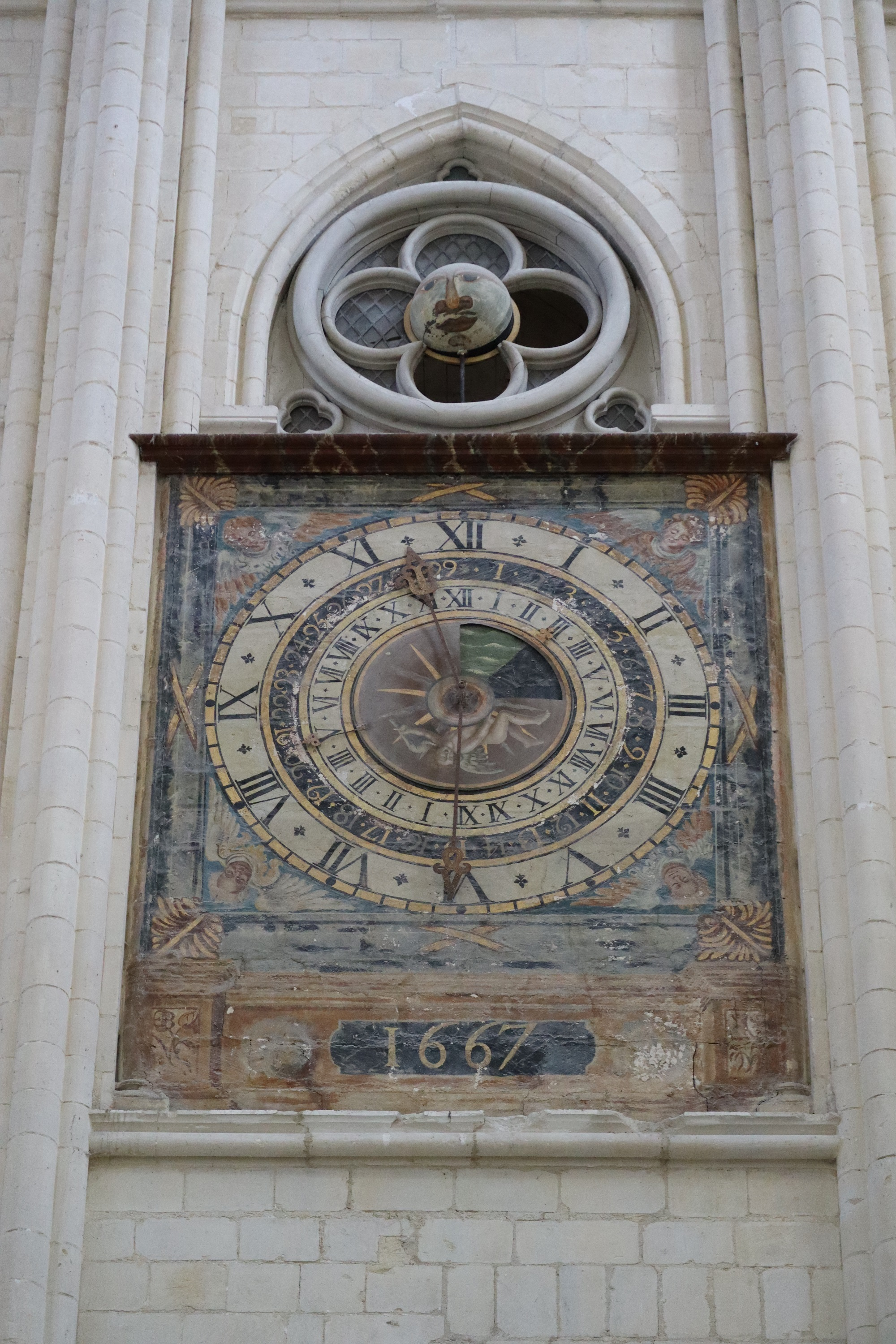
Fécamp Abbey

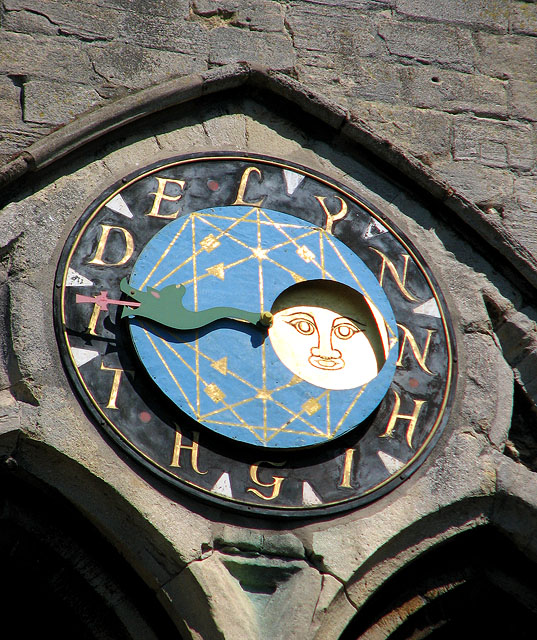
King's Lynn

== See also ==
- Tide predicting machine
