= Dexter cattle =

Irish breed of cattle

Dexter
- Red Dexter cow in Macamic, Quebec
- Conservation status: FAO (2007): not at risk; DAD-IS (2022, Ireland): at risk/critical; DAD-IS (2022, transboundary): not at risk; RBST (2023): native breeds
- Country of origin: Ireland
- Distribution: world-wide
- Use: dual-purpose, meat and milk

Traits
- Weight: Female: average 325 kg (700 lb)
- Height: Male: 102–112 cm (40–44 in); Female: 97–107 cm (38–42 in)
- Coat: usually black, also red or dun
- Horn status: usually horned, sometimes polled

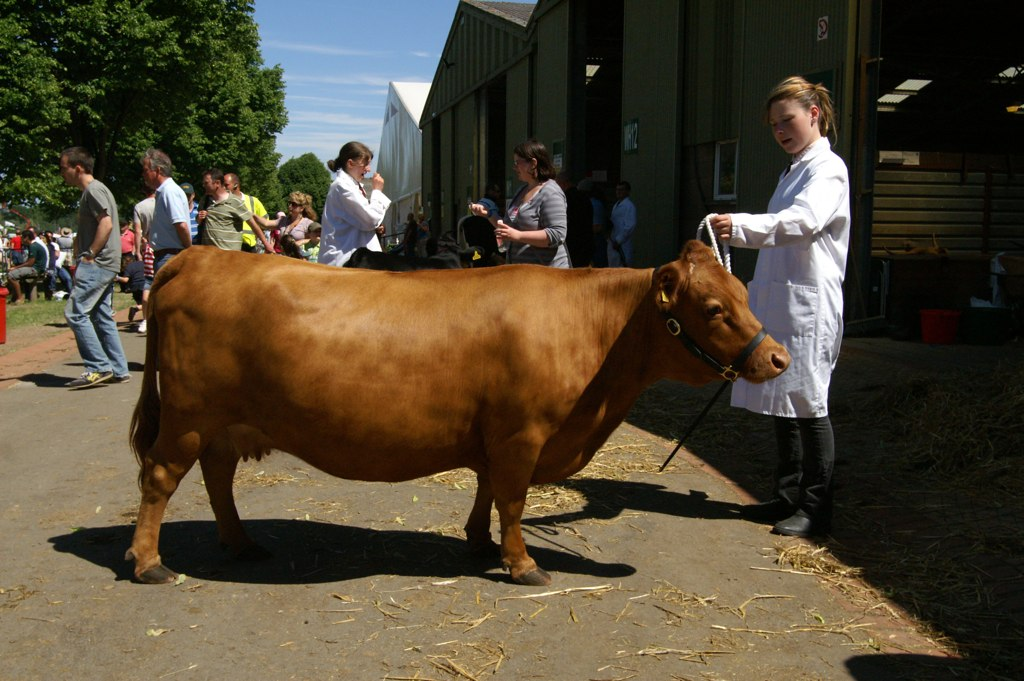
A chondrodysplastic-dwarf cow

The Dexter is an Irish breed of small cattle. It originated in the eighteenth century in County Kerry, in south-western Ireland, and appears to be named after a man named Dexter, who was factor of the estates of Lord Hawarden on Valentia Island. Until the second half of the nineteenth century it was considered a type within the Kerry breed.

== History ==
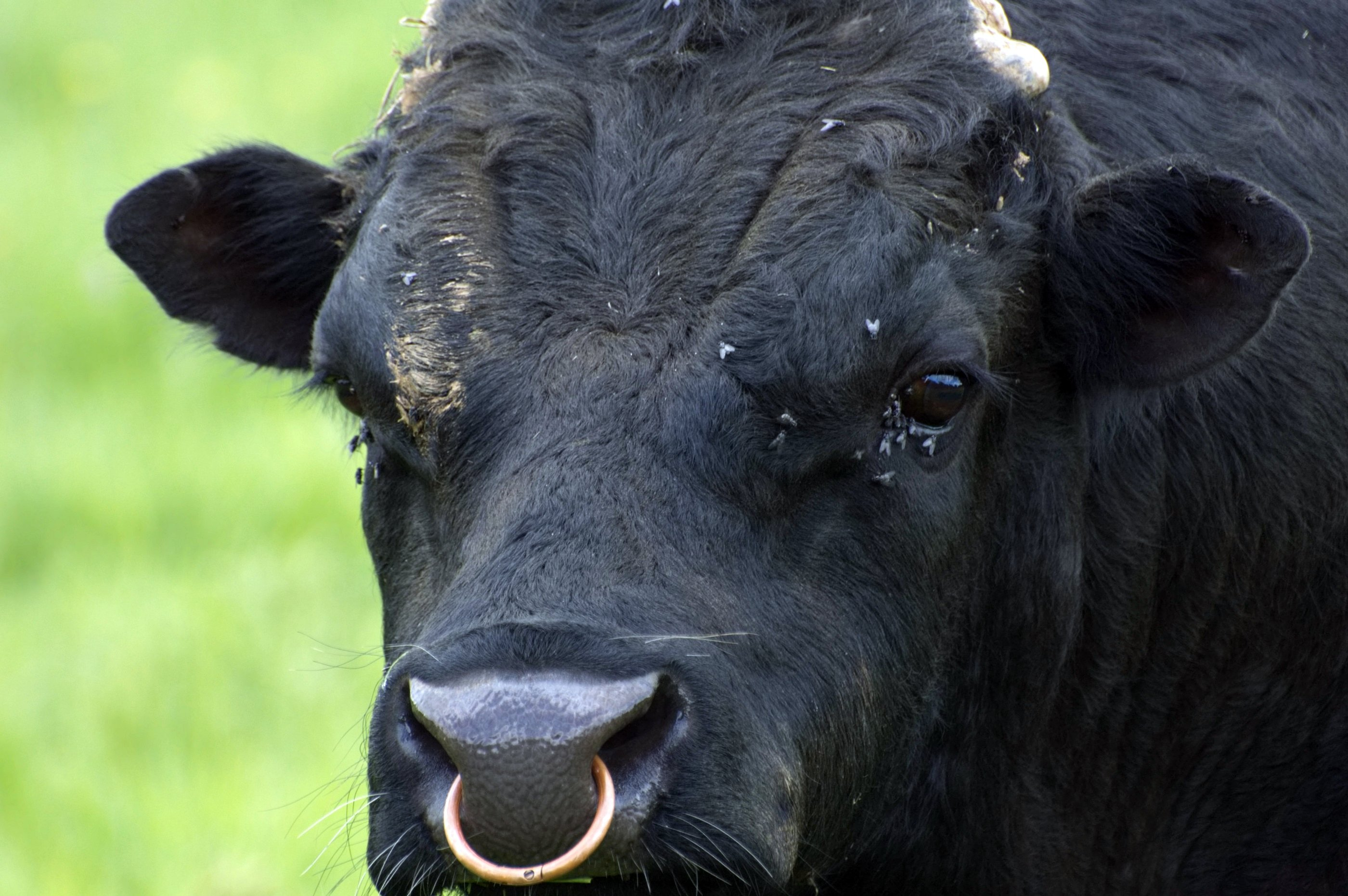
Bull

The Dexter originated in the eighteenth century in County Kerry, in south-western Ireland, and was apparently named after a man named Dexter, who was factor of the estates of Lord Hawarden on Valentia Island. Rotund short-legged Kerry cattle are documented from the late eighteenth century; the Scottish agriculturalist David Low, writing in 1842, describes them as the "Dexter Breed", and writes "When any individual of a Kerry drove appears remarkably round and short legged, it is common for the country people to call it a Dexter". Until the second half of the nineteenth century the Dexter was considered a type within the Kerry breed; from 1863 it was shown in a separate class at the agricultural shows of the Royal Dublin Society. A joint herd-book, The Kerry and Dexter Herd Book, was established in 1890, and a breed society, the Kerry and Dexter Cattle Society of Ireland, was started in 1917; the name was shortened to the Kerry Cattle Society of Ireland in 1919.

It was brought to England in 1882. The breed virtually disappeared in Ireland, but was still maintained as a pure breed in a number of small herds in England and the United States.

In 2023 it was reported to DAD-IS by sixteen countries in Africa, the Americas, Europe and Oceania; the largest populations were in Denmark and the United Kingdom. Its conservation status worldwide is listed as 'not at risk', while for Ireland it is listed as 'at risk/critical'.

== Characteristics ==
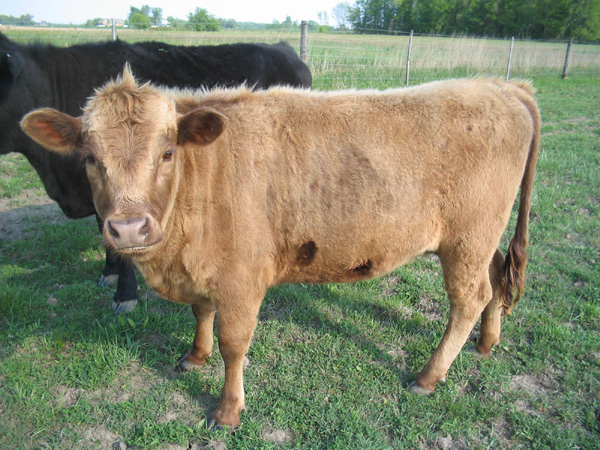
Dun heifer

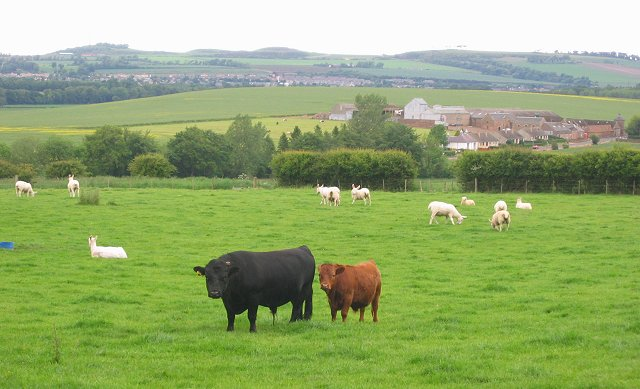
At pasture near Bolton, East Lothian

The cattle are small; heights at the withers for bulls are usually in the range 102–112 cm, for cows about 5 cm less; the average weight of a cow is approximately 325 kg. The coat is usually solid black, but may also be red or dun. The cattle were formerly always horned; in the twenty-first century some polled examples are seen, but the mechanism of introduction of this characteristic has not been identified.

Some Dexter cattle carry a gene for chondrodysplasia (a semilethal gene), which is a form of dwarfism that results in shorter legs than unaffected cattle. Chondrodysplasia-affected Dexters are typically 6–8 in shorter in height than unaffected ones. Breeding two chondrodysplasia-affected Dexters together results in a 25% chance that the foetus can abort prematurely. A DNA test is available to test for the chondrodysplasia gene, using tail hairs from the animal.

The aborted foetus is commonly called a bulldog, a stillborn calf that has a bulging head, compressed nose, protruding lower jaw, and swollen tongue, as well as extremely short limbs. The occurrence of bulldog foetuses is higher in calves born with a black coat than a red coat, because black coat colour is more common. Short-legged Dexter cattle are considered to be heterozygous, while bulldog foetuses are homozygous for chondrodysplasia genes.

Dexters can also be affected with pulmonary hypoplasia with anasarca (PHA), which is an incomplete formation of the lungs with accumulation of a serum fluid in various parts of the tissue of the foetus. Unlike chondrodysplasia, which has many physical signs, PHA shows no outward signs and is only detectable through DNA testing. As with Chondrodysplasia, PHA-affected Dexters should not be bred together.

Dexter cattle have short legs compared to other breeds; increased shortness is displayed from the knee to the fetlock.

The cattle industry highly values Dexter cattle as they are considered to be hardy, efficient grazers that are able to thrive on poor land.

== Use ==
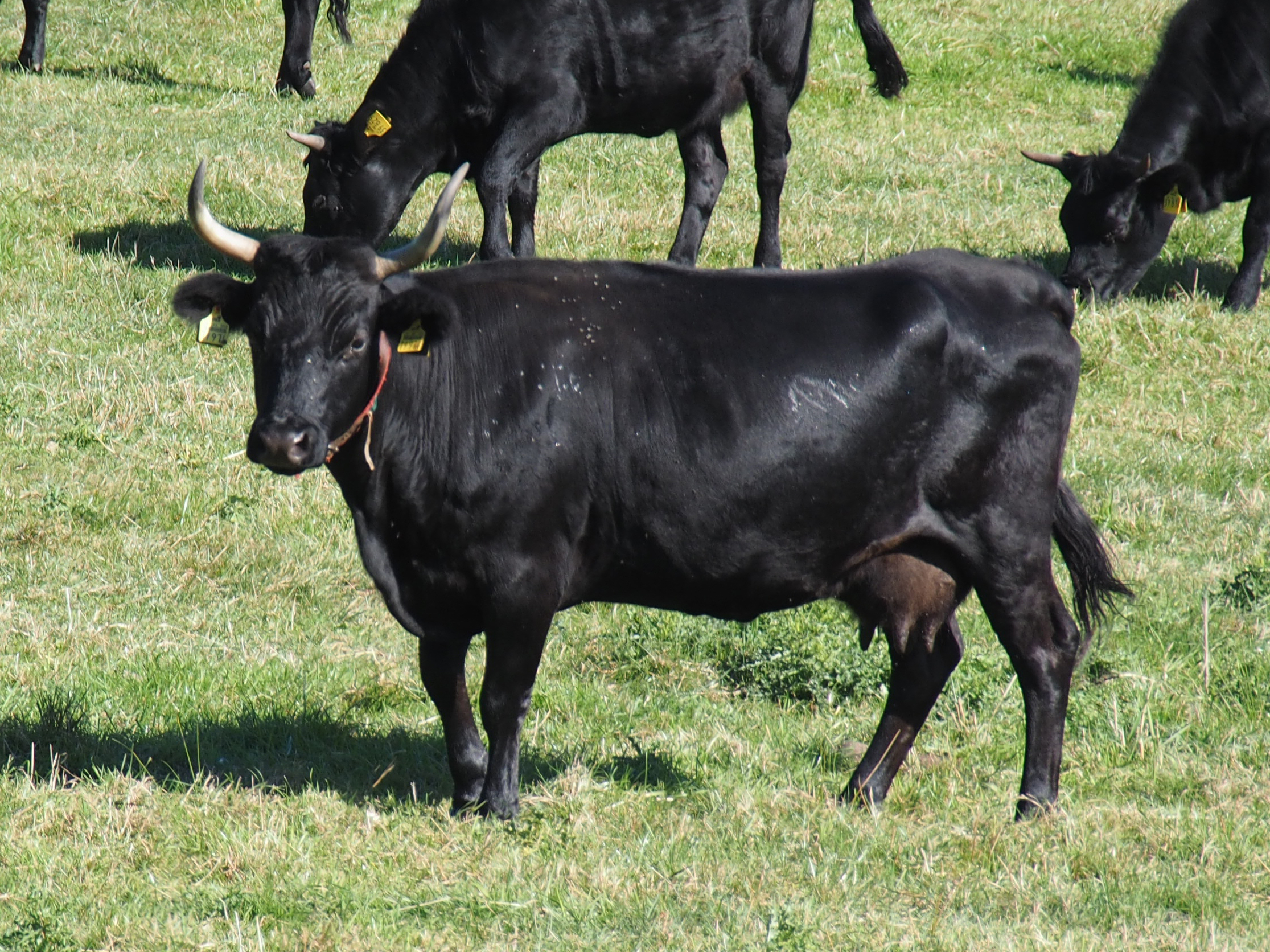
Dexter cow

The Dexter is dual-purpose breed, reared for both milk and beef. Milk yields average about 2250 kg per lactation, although some farms may reach an average of 3000 kg. In flavour and texture the meat is often less good than that of other breeds, especially if it is from a very short-legged animal.
