= American White Park =

Cattle breed

The American White Park is a large, mostly polled, white breed of cattle. The females have an average weight of roughly 1000 pounds (453 kilograms), while the males have an average weight between 1700 and 1800 pounds (771–816 kilograms).
