= Tory Island Cattle =

Breed of cattle

Tory Island Cattle are a rare breed of cattle from Tory Island in County Donegal, Ireland.
