= The Old Cows Days/The Days of the Brindled Cow =

Days in the Irish spring

The Days of the Brindled Cow, or Irish: Laethanta na Bó Riabhaí, relate to the last days of the month of March and the first days of April, which are often very cold in Ireland and Europe. The name comes from a folk tale, where an old brindled cow boasted that she had outlasted the harsh winter once she had survived to the end of March. March, to spite the cow, borrowed a number of days from April, and the extended cold snap killed the cow. The term can be used to refer to a cold snap at the end of March. The story occurs across Europe.

== Plot ==
In the Irish version of the folklore tale, the Days of the Brindled Cow, there was once in Ireland an old brindled (striped or grey) cow. She had survived through the harsh winter up to the month of March. When she had reached near the end of March, she complained about the bad weather and boasted that she had survived the cold winter. March resented this boast and ‘borrowed’ three days from April to extend the cold winter. This extended cold spell was too much for the cow, who did not have enough reserves to survive to the warmer weather of April, and she died.

The number of days borrowed from April varies. It is frequently noted as three days, but could be as low as one day and in some versions of the tale could be as much as nine or fifteen.

=== Names for this period ===
The period referred to in this folktale is known by many names, based on the reference to the brindled cow, to the killing of the cow and to the borrowing of the April days. Some examples are listed below:

- The Days of the Brindled Cow
- An tSean-Bhó Riabhach/An tSean Bó Riabhaí/ Laethanta na Bó Riabhaí/Laethanta na Riabhaiche/Seanriabhach (Irish language terms referring to the Day of the Brindled Cow, or Old Brindled Cow)
- the Reevogue Days/the Riabhach days/the Reehy Days (‘Reevogue’ is a phonetic spelling of ‘Riabhach’)
- The Ould Cow Days
- The Skinning Days (referring to March killing and skinning the cow)
- The Borrowed Days/The Borrowing Days/The Borouing Days (referring to the days borrowed from April)

== The Brindled Cow ==
The name of the cow in the folk tale – An Bó Riabhach – includes the term for cow in Irish (Bó) and the term for brindled, streaked or dun (Riabhach). The brindled cow is a rare cattle breed in Ireland. Its coat is red/brown with ‘brindled’ streaks. There is estimated to be approximately 60-70 individuals of this species in existence in Ireland.

== Versions of the story ==
- Scotland. In a version of the tale from Scotland, March borrows three days from April to kill three sheep with inclement weather. The sheep survived the three days. The description in Brewer’s Dictionary of phrase and fable notes that February also borrows three days from January.
- Northern Ireland. In a version of the tale from Ulster, three creatures – a blackbird, a stonechat and a grey cow - insulted March, saying that it was finished. March borrowed nine days, three for each creature, in order to punish them by extending winter.
- Bulgaria. Baba Marta Day (Grandmother March's day) is celebrated in Bulgaria. Baba Marta has brothers, January, February and April. An old shepherd brought her flocks up the mountain at the end of March, believing that Baba March would grant her fine weather because she was as old as Baba March. Baba March took offence at being considered old, and borrowed a number of days from her brother April. These borrowed days (zaemnitsi or "few days") extended March and froze the shepherd and her flocks.
- Greece. In Greek folklore, the 'borrowed days' are exchanged between March and February. In this story, March was cold and many animals died. However, one old woman's goats survived and the woman boasted that March hadn't killed her animals. March became angry and borrowed two days from February to punish her. These two days were so cold that almost all the animals died. But the old woman concealed three thousand goats under her cauldron and these animals survived. In another version of the story, the woman hid under her cauldron with her animals, but they were all frozen to death. The two days borrowed from February explains how February has only 28 days.
