= Kerry cattle =

Cattle breed, native to Ireland

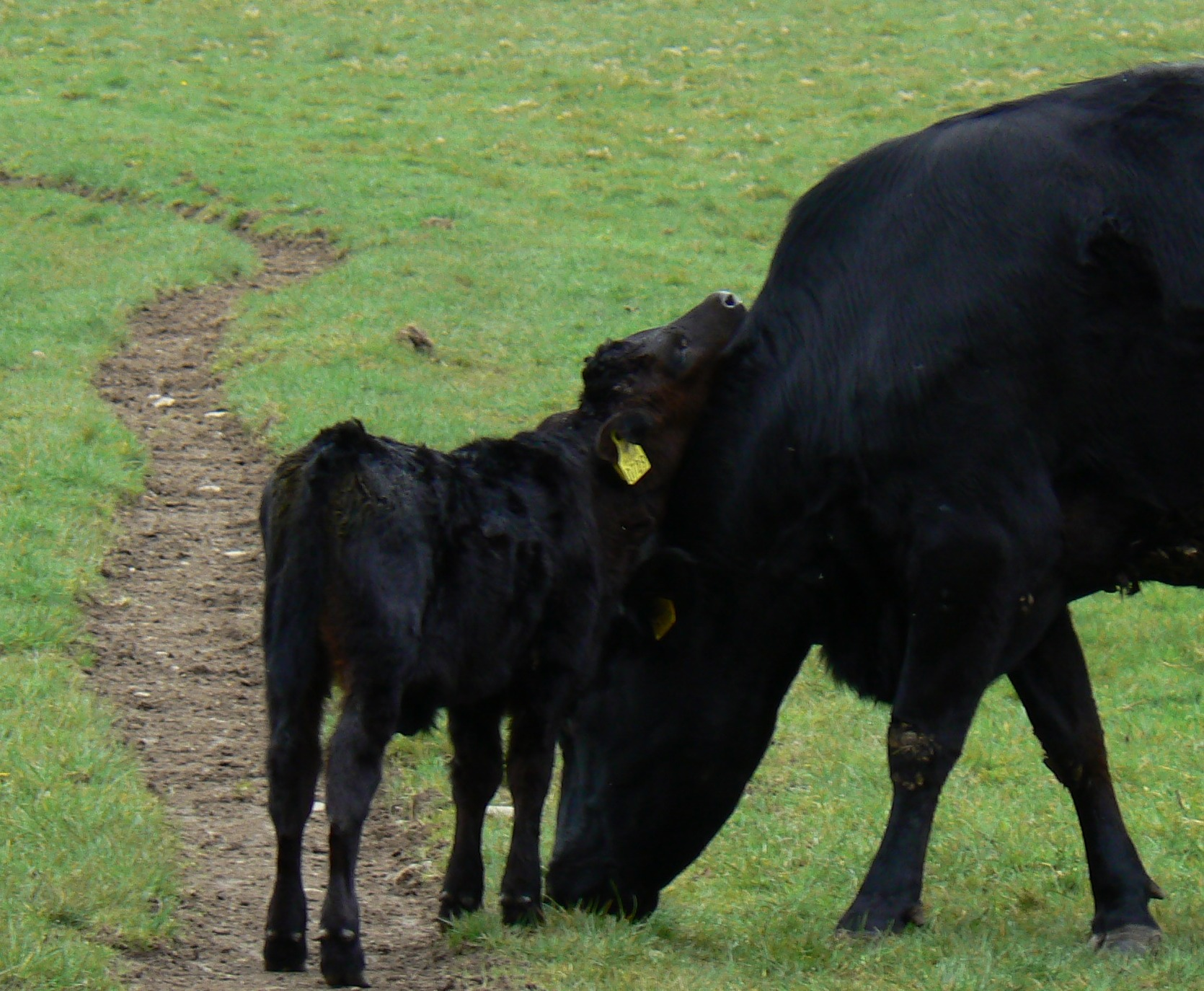
A Kerry cow and calf in Killarney National Park

Kerry cattle (Irish: Bó Chiarraí or Bollatach or Buinín) are a rare breed of dairy cattle, native to Ireland. They are believed to be one of the oldest breeds in Europe, probably derived from small black cattle brought to Ireland by Neolithic man. They were probably also the first cattle bred mainly for milk production, with other breeds being developed mainly for draught and meat. The climate of southwestern Ireland was suitable for milk production year-round, and the Celts also stored milk in the form of cheese and butter.

Their coat is almost entirely black, with a little white on the udder. The horns are whitish with dark tips, but they are usually dehorned. Cows weigh about 350 to 450 kg (770 to 990 lb) and produce 3,000 to 3,700 kg (6,600 to 8,200 lb) of milk per lactation. The globules of fat are very small which makes the milk eminently suitable for the production of cheese, butter and yoghurt.

The breed is probably descended from the Celtic Shorthorn, brought to Ireland as early as 2000 BC. They were developed as a milking breed suited to small subsistence farms of southern and western Ireland. They cause less damage to soils in high rainfall areas than larger breeds. By 1983 there were only around 200 pedigree Kerry cattle in the world, but numbers have since increased. A herd is maintained in the Irish state-owned estate of Farmleigh.

Kerry cattle were imported to the United States in 1818 and prospered in the nineteenth century, but had become scarce by the 1930s. Today there are only a few herds in North America, mostly more recent imports to Canada.
