= List of baronies of Northern Ireland =

This is a list of the historic baronies of Northern Ireland. Baronies were subdivisions of counties, mainly cadastral but with some administrative functions prior to the Local Government (Ireland) Act 1898.

== County Antrim ==
There were 15 baronies in County Antrim:

- Antrim Lower
- Antrim Upper
- Belfast Lower
- Belfast Upper
- Carrickfergus
- Cary
- Dunluce Lower
- Dunluce Upper
- Glenarm Lower
- Glenarm Upper
- Kilconway
- Massereene Lower
- Massereene Upper
- Toome Lower
- Toome Upper

== County Armagh ==
There were 8 baronies in County Armagh:

- Armagh
- Fews Lower
- Fews Upper
- Oneilland East
- Oneilland West
- Orior Lower
- Orior Upper
- Tiranny or Turaney

== County Down ==
There were 14 baronies in County Down:

- Ards Lower
- Ards Upper
- Castlereagh Lower
- Castlereagh Upper
- Dufferin
- Iveagh Lower, Lower Half
- Iveagh Lower, Upper Half
- Iveagh Upper, Lower Half
- Iveagh Upper, Upper Half
- Kinelarty
- Lecale Lower
- Lecale Upper
- Lordship of Newry
- Mourne

== County Fermanagh ==
There were 8 baronies in County Fermanagh:

- Clanawley
- Clankelly
- Coole
- Knockninny
- Lurg
- Magheraboy
- Magherastephana
- Tirkennedy

== County Londonderry ==
There were 6 baronies in County Londonderry:

- Coleraine
- Keenaght
- Loughinsholin
- North East Liberties of Coleraine
- North-West Liberties of Londonderry
- Tirkeeran

== County Tyrone ==
There were 8 baronies in County Tyrone:

- Clogher
- Dungannon Lower
- Dungannon Middle
- Dungannon Upper
- Omagh East
- Omagh West
- Strabane Lower
- Strabane Upper

== See also ==
- List of baronies of Ireland
