= Islandreagh =

Islandreagh: Irish: An tOileán Riabhach
- County: County Antrim
- Country: Northern Ireland
- Sovereign state: United Kingdom
- Postcode district: BT41
- Dialling code: 028
- UK Parliament: South Antrim
- NI Assembly: South Antrim

Islandreagh (from Irish An tOileán Riabhach, meaning 'the grey or streaked island') is a townland of 392 acres in County Antrim, Northern Ireland. It is situated in the civil parish of Grange of Nilteen and the historic barony of Antrim Upper.

== History ==
The name of the townland was recorded variously as Islanereagh in 1669 and Island Reagh in 1780.

== People ==
- Alec Cooke, Baron Cooke of Islandreagh (1920–2007) was a Northern Ireland politician created a life peer as Baron Cooke of Islandreagh in the County of Antrim, on 11 August 1992. He lived at Islandreagh House in Dunadry.

== See also ==
- List of townlands in County Antrim
