= Aghancrossy =

Coordinates: 55°07′30″N 6°27′39″W

Aghancrossy: Irish: Achadh na Croise
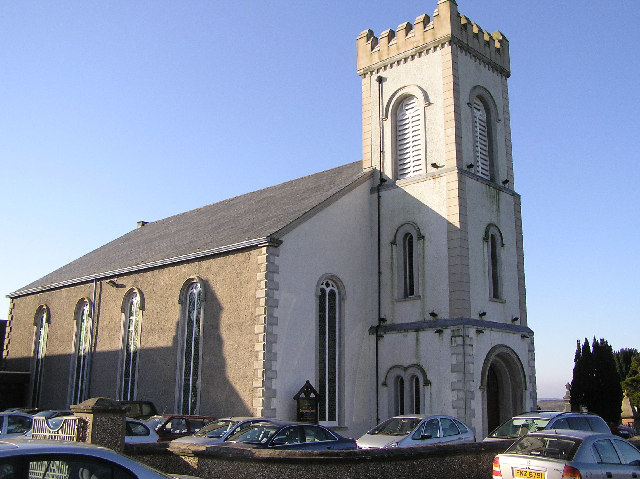
- Dervock Presbyterian Church in Aghancrossy townland, 2006

- Location within Northern Ireland
- County: County Antrim
- Country: Northern Ireland
- Sovereign state: United Kingdom
- Postcode district: BT53
- Dialling code: 028
- UK Parliament: North Antrim
- NI Assembly: North Antrim

Aghancrossy is a townland in County Antrim, Northern Ireland, near Dervock. It is situated in the historic barony of Dunluce Lower and the civil parish of Derrykeighan and covers an area of 55 acres

The name derives from the Irish: Achadh na Croise (field of the cross). The population of the townland decreased during the 19th century:

Year	1841	1851	1861	1871	1881	1891
Population	30	13	9	10	13	9
Houses	4	2	2	2	2	2

== See also ==
- List of townlands in County Antrim
