= Ballydivity =

Coordinates: 55°09′N 6°30′W

Ballydivity: Irish: Baile Mhic Duibhidighe
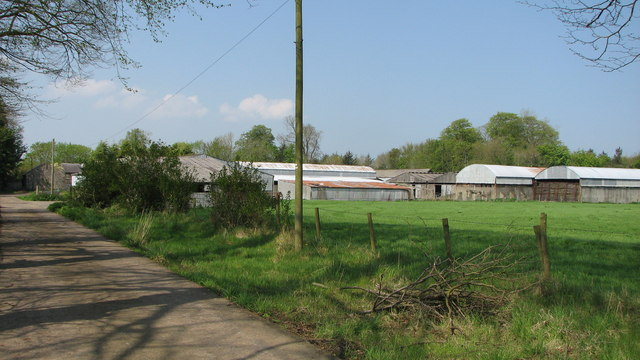
- Ballydivity in 2008
- County: County Antrim
- Country: Northern Ireland
- Sovereign state: United Kingdom
- Postcode district: BT57
- Dialling code: 028

Ballydivity (from Irish Baile Mhic Duibhidighe, meaning 'McDevitts town') is a townland of 333 acres in County Antrim, Northern Ireland. It is situated in the civil parish of Derrykeighan and historic barony of Dunluce Lower.

== Places of interest ==
Ballydivity House, near Ballymoney is a two-storey three-bay house of c.1760. It was added to from c.1810 and a central staircase and drawing room extended in 1911. The demesne features mature shelter belt trees, two walled gardens and a gardener's house. It is not open to the public.

== See also ==
- List of townlands in County Antrim
