= Moyadam =

Townland in County Antrim, Northern Ireland

Moyadam: Irish: Maigh Doinn
- County: County Antrim
- Country: Northern Ireland
- Sovereign state: United Kingdom
- Postcode district: BT41
- Dialling code: 028

Moyadam (from Irish Maigh Doinn, meaning 'Donn’s plain') is a townland of 685 acres in County Antrim, Northern Ireland. It is situated in the civil parish of Grange of Nilteen and the historic barony of Antrim Upper.

== History ==
In the Papal Taxation c.1306 the name of the townland is recorded as Maudone, the name of a church site. Its name is variously recorded as Ballimoyden in 1605 and Ballymoyeden in 1621.

== Archaeology ==
The townland contains a standing stone at grid ref: J2510 8831.

== See also ==
- List of townlands in County Antrim
- List of archaeological sites in County Antrim
