= Mostragee =

Mostragee: Irish: Maighistir Gaoithe
- County: County Antrim
- Country: Northern Ireland
- Sovereign state: United Kingdom
- Postcode district: BT53
- Dialling code: 028

Mostragee (from Irish Maighistir Gaoithe, meaning 'master of the wind') is a townland of 300 acres in County Antrim, Northern Ireland. It is situated in the civil parish of Derrykeighan and historic barony of Dunluce Lower.

== See also ==
- List of townlands in County Antrim
