= Islandahoe =

Islandahoe: Irish: Oileán Dá Eo
- County: County Antrim
- Country: Northern Ireland
- Sovereign state: United Kingdom
- Postcode district: BT53
- Dialling code: 028

Islandahoe (from Irish Oileán Dá Eo, meaning 'island of the two yews') is a townland of 250 acres in County Antrim, Northern Ireland. It is situated in the civil parish of Derrykeighan and historic barony of Dunluce Lower.

== See also ==
- List of townlands in County Antrim
