= Ballybentragh =

Coordinates: 54.7114°N 6.11076°W

Ballybentragh: Irish: Baile Beanntrach
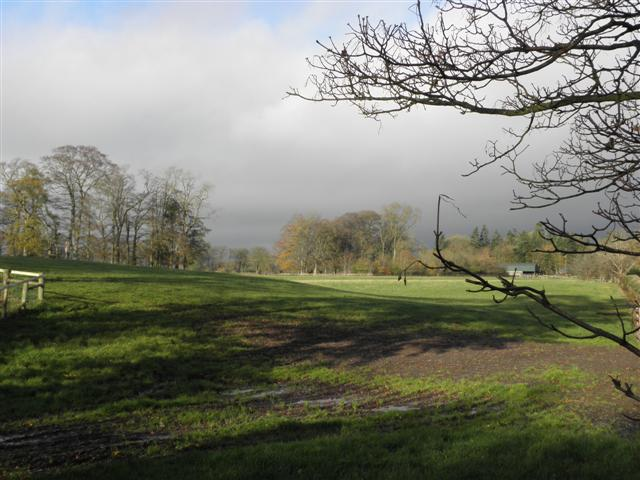
- Ballybentragh townland in 2009

- Location within Northern Ireland
- County: County Antrim
- Country: Northern Ireland
- Sovereign state: United Kingdom
- Postcode district: BT41

Ballybentragh (from Irish Baile Beanntrach, meaning 'townland of the hilly places') is a townland of 402 acres in County Antrim, Northern Ireland. It is situated in the civil parish of Grange of Nilteen and the historic barony of Antrim Upper.

== History ==
The name of the townland was recorded variously as Ballinebantro in 1605 and Ballybentrogh in 1669.

== See also ==
- List of townlands in County Antrim
- List of places in County Antrim
