= Rathbeg, County Antrim =

Townland (administrative division) in Northern Ireland

Rathbeg: Irish: An Ráth Beag
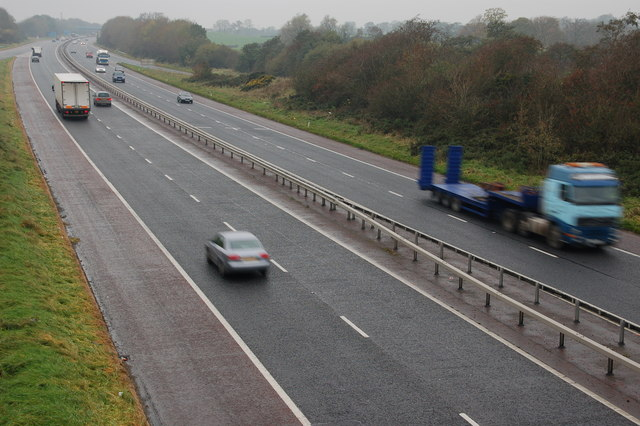
- M2 motorway at Rathbeg in 2006
- County: County Antrim
- Country: Northern Ireland
- Sovereign state: United Kingdom
- Postcode district: BT41
- Dialling code: 028

Rathbeg (from Irish An Ráth Beag, meaning 'the little fort') is a townland in County Antrim, Northern Ireland. It is situated in the civil parishes of Grange of Nilteen (3 acres) and Donegore (178 acres), both in the historic barony of Antrim Upper.

== History ==
The townland name is first recorded in the Annals of the Four Masters, which reported that the High King of Ireland, Diarmait mac Cerbaill, was slain by Áed Dub mac Suibni, the king of Dál nAraidi and Ulaid, was slain at Rdith Bec in 565 AD. The fort after which the townland is named was removed during the construction of the M2 motorway in 1973, although the name Rathbeg was retained for the traffic roundabout in the townland.

== Archaeology ==
In 1967 rescue excavations took place in advance of motorway construction (at grid ref: J183882) at the rath site some 2.5 miles north-east of Antrim. The rath had been surrounded by a V-shaped ditch 19 ft wide and 9 ft deep. Fragments of a cordoned souterrain pot were found and a kiln structure and charcoal remains.

== See also ==
- List of townlands in County Antrim
