= Loughermore, County Antrim =

Loughermore: Irish: An Luachair Mhór
- County: County Antrim
- Country: Northern Ireland
- Sovereign state: United Kingdom
- Postcode district: BT41
- Dialling code: 028

Loughermore (from Irish An Luachair Mhór, meaning 'the great rushy place') is a townland of 142 acres in County Antrim, Northern Ireland. It is situated in the civil parish of Grange of Nilteen and the historic barony of Antrim Upper.

== See also ==
- List of townlands in County Antrim
