= Lisnarick =

Lisnarick may refer to:

- Lisnarick, County Antrim, a townland in County Antrim, Northern Ireland
- Lisnarick, County Fermanagh, a small village in County Fermanagh, Northern Ireland
