= Legacurry, County Antrim =

Legacurry: Irish: Lag an Choire
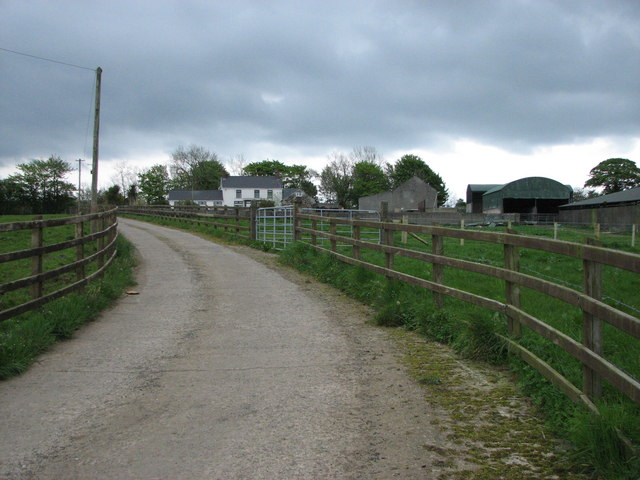
- Farm in Legacurry
- County: County Antrim
- Country: Northern Ireland
- Sovereign state: United Kingdom
- Postcode district: BT
- Dialling code: 028

Legacurry (from Irish Lag an Choire, meaning 'hollow of the cauldron') is a townland of 226 acres in County Antrim, Northern Ireland. It is situated in the civil parish of Kilraghts and the historic barony of Dunluce Upper.

== See also ==
- List of townlands in County Antrim
