= Killeaton =

Killeaton: Irish: Coill Eatain
- County: County Antrim
- Country: Northern Ireland
- Sovereign state: United Kingdom
- Police: Northern Ireland
- Fire: Northern Ireland
- Ambulance: Northern Ireland

Killeaton (from Irish Coill Eatain, meaning 'Eaton's wood') is a townland of 238 acres in County Antrim, Northern Ireland, close to Belfast. It is situated in the civil parish of Derriaghy and the historic Barony of Belfast Upper.

The Killeaton housing estate was built in the 1950s by Messrs. J. F. McCall & Sons. Although in more recent years new houses have been built in the area, such as Queensway Park, Killeaton Place and the Rose Gardens. In June 2012, severe flooding following torrential rain, left 80 homes under 4 ft of water in Killeaton and residents having to be rescued by boat.

Killeaton is also adjacent to Dunmurry Industrial Estate, the location of the DeLorean Motor Company factory, where the DeLorean was manufactured from 1981 until production ended in 1982. It was famously featured in the Back to the Future movie trilogy.

== Transport ==
Public transport links for the area include both buses and trains from Derriaghy railway station just a short walk away.
