= Ballyrashane =

Village in County Londonderry, Northern Ireland

- Village and civil parish
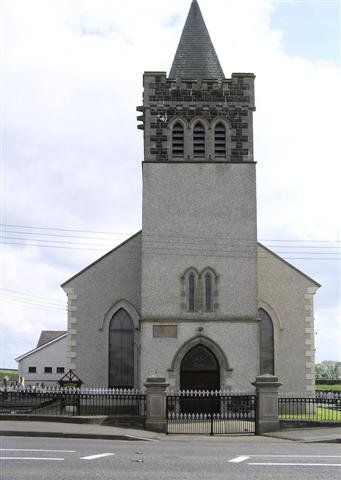
- Ballyrashane Presbyterian Church

- Location within Northern Ireland
- Coordinates: 55.142°N 6.605°W
- Country: United Kingdom
- Province: Northern Ireland
- County: Antrim and Londonderry

Ballyrashane (from Irish Baile Ráth Seain) is a small village and civil parish outside Coleraine, County Londonderry, Northern Ireland. The civil parish of Ballyrashane covers areas of County Antrim (in the historic barony of Dunluce Lower), as well as County Londonderry (in the historic barony of North East Liberties of Coleraine). It is part of Causeway Coast and Glens district.

It is well known for its creamery, Ballyrashane Creamery, which processes milk, butter and cheese for shops and supermarkets all over Ireland and Europe.

Ballyrashane Flute Band celebrated their 100th year in 2008. They are a traditional "First Flute" marching band, and are known locally as "The White Army" due to their distinctive uniform.

There are two churches in Ballyrashane - the Presbyterian, and St John's Church of Ireland

== Civil parish of Ballyrashane ==
=== Townlands ===
The civil parish contains the following townlands:

=== A ===
Articrunaght North, Articrunaght South

=== B ===
Ballindreen Irish, Ballindreen Scotch, Ballynag Lower, Ballynag Upper, Ballyrock Irish, Ballyrock Scotch, Ballyvelton Lower, Ballyvelton Upper, Ballyversall, Ballywatt East, Ballywatt Leggs, Ballywatt West

=== C ===
Carnglass Beg, Carnglass More, Cloyfin South

=== G ===
Glebe, Gorticloghan

=== I ===
Island Effrick North, Island Effrick South

=== K ===
Kilmoyle, Kirkistown, Knocknakeeragh

=== L ===
Lisnagalt, Lisnarick, Lisnisk, Liswatty Lower, Liswatty Upper

=== O ===
Oldtown, Outhill

=== R ===
Revallagh North, Revallagh South, Risk

== See also ==
- List of towns and villages in Northern Ireland
- List of civil parishes of County Antrim
- List of civil parishes of County Londonderry
