= Muckamore Abbey Hospital =

Mental health hospital in Muckamore, Northern Ireland

- Belfast Health and Social Care Trust
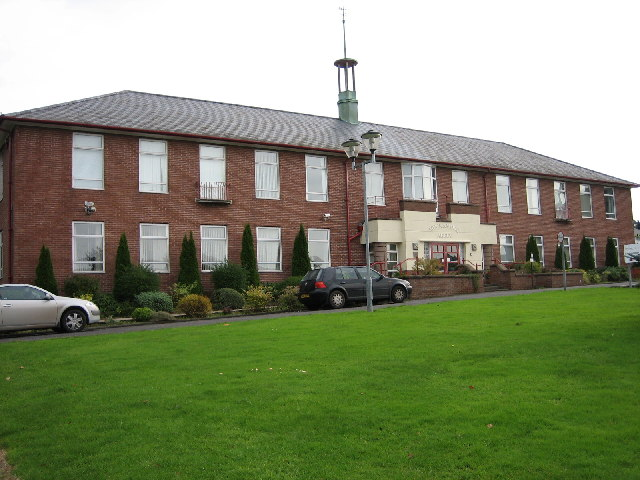
- Muckamore Abbey Hospital

- Location in Northern Ireland

Geography
- Location: Abbey Road, Muckamore, Antrim, Northern Ireland
- Coordinates: 54.6923°N 6.1887°W

Organisation
- Care system: Health and Social Care in Northern Ireland
- Type: Specialist

Services
- Speciality: Mental health

History
- Founded: 1949

The Muckamore Abbey Hospital is a health facility on Abbey Road, Muckamore, County Antrim, Northern Ireland. It is managed by the Belfast Health and Social Care Trust.

As of 2026, it is the subject of an investigation into what has been described as the largest systemic abuse case uncovered in the UK.

== History ==
The facility, which is located just south of a ruined Augustinian priory, opened as a mental health facility in 1949. A "special care colony" for people with an intellectual disability, with capacity of up to 1,000 patients, was added in 1958.

It was discovered in 2017 that the hospital's new CCTV system had for some time been recording all activities in the hospital, unknown to staff. Review of the material revealed widespread abuse of patients. Some 300,000 hours of footage was discovered including "accounts of patients facing appalling cruelty and physical abuse, and being ignored while seriously unwell."

Following a 2019 investigation into alleged abuses at the hospital, the Department of Health stated that it was considering a planned closure of the hospital. This case has been called "the largest systemic abuse case uncovered in the UK".

== Statutory inquiry ==
A statutory inquiry was announced on 8 September 2020 and was established on 11 October 2021 to examine the issue of abuse of patients at the hospital. The purpose of the Inquiry was stated as: "to ensure that such abuse does not occur again at MAH or any other institution in Northern Ireland which provides similar services".

The total expenditure known to 31 March 2025 was £13.56m, and final costs will be published later.

According to the chair’s statement update at closing, issued on 10 March 2025: 90 witnesses gave evidence particularly regarding the experience of patients; evidence was also given by hospital staff regarding their experience, and by organisations that "had either had supervisory, commissioning or regulatory roles" and "from those responsible for the direct management of the hospital and for the running of the Trust"; and the Inquiry was also looking to hear from a wider range of people.

The Inquiry has been criticised by families of patients, and by public health expert Dr Gabriel Scally.

The report was published on 18 June 2026. In the report, it is stated that five criminal trials regarding the event described were pending at the time of the report's release. Because of this, some evidence to the tribunal had to be given in private so as not to prejudice these trials.
