= Grange of Nilteen =

- County: County Antrim
- Country: Northern Ireland
- Sovereign state: United Kingdom
- Postcode district: BT41
- Dialling code: 028
- UK Parliament: South Antrim
- NI Assembly: South Antrim

Grange of Nilteen is a civil parish in County Antrim, Northern Ireland. It is situated in the historic barony of Antrim Upper. It is 3.5 miles east of Antrim on the Six Mile Water River.

== Civil parish of Grange of Nilteen ==
The civil parish includes the hamlet of Dunadry.

== Townlands ==
The civil parish contains the following townlands: Ballybentragh, Donegore, Dunadry, Islandreagh, Loughermore, Moyadam, Rathbeg and Rathmore.

== See also ==
- List of civil parishes of County Antrim
