= Muckamore =

Townland and village in County Antrim, Northern Ireland

Coordinates: 54.6990°N 6.1833°W

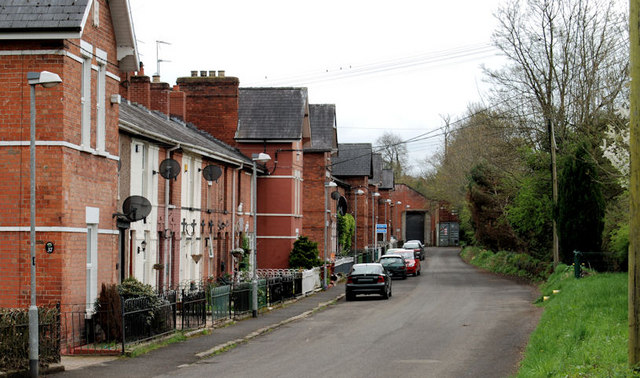
A terrace of houses in Muckamore

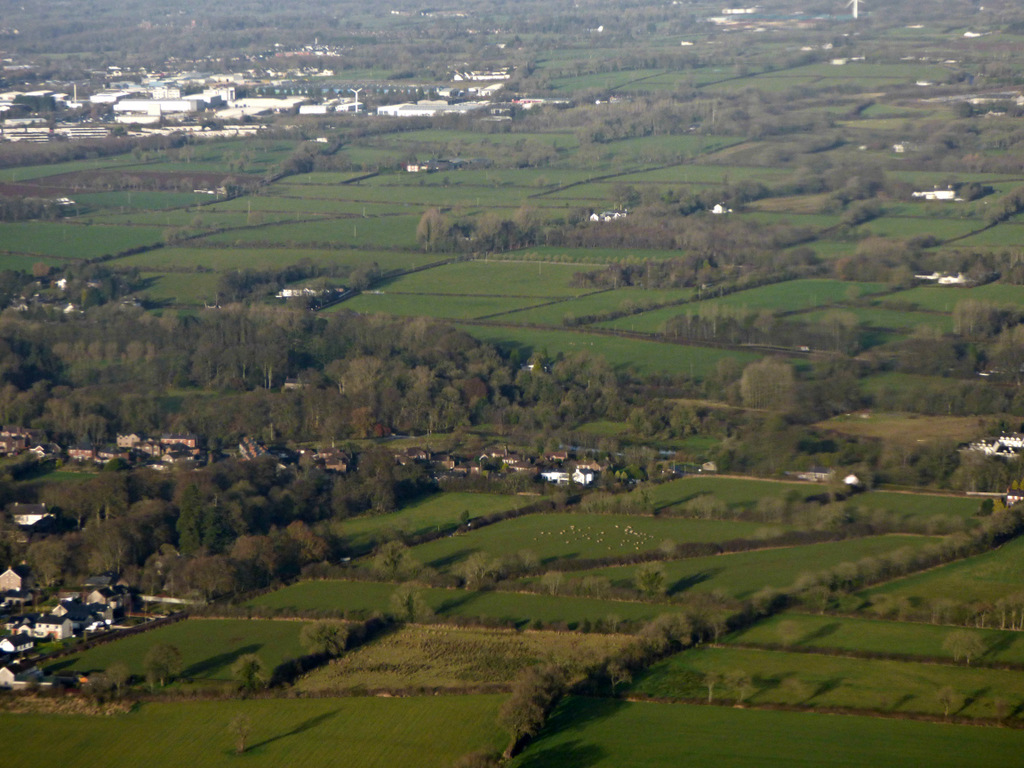
Muckamore from the air, showing Muckamore Forest

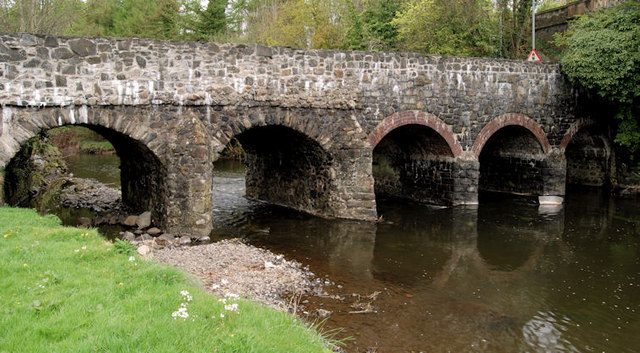
Muckamore bridge

Muckamore (Irish: Maigh Chomair) is a townland and village on the outskirts of Antrim in County Antrim, Northern Ireland. It is located in the civil parish of the Grange of Muckamore in the barony of Massereene Lower.

It is the location of Muckamore Abbey Hospital and the disused Muckamore railway station. Muckamore Cricket Club is named after the village. Muckamore Forest is nearby.

== History ==
Muckamore Priory was an Augustinian priory which dates back to at least 1283, and was itself built on the site of an earlier church building. Only buried ruins of the original priory remain, which were examined during excavations in 1973. A further survey was made in 2011.

A document in the Ordnance Survey Memoirs of Ireland hypothesizes that the name may have derived from the Irish muck airi mor, for "great field of adoration".

In 1861, the townland of Muckamore was described as having ten subdivisions, known as "towns". As of 1831, it had a recorded population of 1,479.
