= Muckamore Forest =

Forest in County Antrim, Northern Ireland

Coordinates: 54.6983°N 6.2145°W

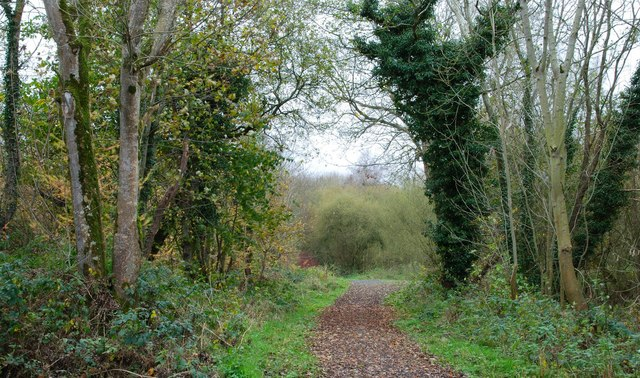
Rea's Wood in Muckamore Forest

Muckamore Forest is an 8.45 hectares (20.9 acres) forest in County Antrim in Northern Ireland. It is named after the adjacent village of Muckamore. Nearby is Rea's Wood, a 41.83 hectares (103.4 acres) Special Area of Conservation which extends around the south and west of Antrim, including the shore of Lough Neagh.
