= Legacurry =

Legacurry may refer to:

- Legacurry, County Antrim, a townland in County Antrim, Northern Ireland
- Legacurry, County Donegal, a townland in County Donegal, Ireland
- Legacurry, County Down, a townland in County Down, Northern Ireland
- Legacurry, County Fermanagh, a townland in County Fermanagh, Northern Ireland
