= Cary (barony) =

Cary Cathraí (Irish)
- Barony
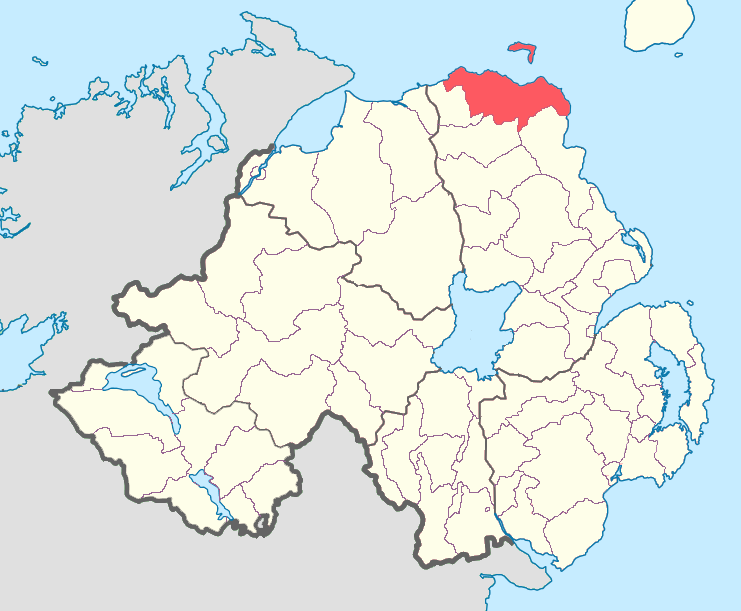
- Location of Cary, County Antrim, Northern Ireland.
- Sovereign state: United Kingdom
- Country: Northern Ireland
- County: Antrim

Area
  - Total: 117.24 sq mi (303.66 km^{2})

Cary is a historic barony in County Antrim, Northern Ireland. To its north is the north-Antrim coast, and it is bordered by three other baronies: Dunluce Lower to the west; Dunluce Upper to the south; and Glenarm Lower to the south-east. The Giant's Causeway is situated on the north coast of Cary. Dunineny Castle lies in the civil parish of Ramoan within this barony.

The barony is named after the Cothrugu (Cotraigib, Crotraigib), an ancient tribe.

The hurling club Carey Faughs GAC, located in Ballyvoy, takes its name from the barony.

== Geographical features ==
The geographical features of Cary include:

- Giant's Causeway
- Carneighaneigh and Knocklayd mountains
- Glenshesk valley
- The bays of Marketon (Margietown), Whitepark Bay, Cooraghy, and Murlough Bay
- Doon, Lacada, and the Giant's Causeway points
- The islands of Carrickarede and Rathlin Island
- Loughaveema and Lough Doo
- The promontories of Bengore Head, Benbane Head, Fair Head, Torr Head, and Runabay Head

== List of settlements ==
Below is a list of settlements in Cary:

- Ballycastle

== List of civil parishes ==
Below is a list of civil parishes in Cary:

- Armoy (split with barony of Dunluce Upper)
- Ballintoy
- Billy (split with barony of Dunluce Lower)
- Culfeightrin
- Grange of Drumtullagh
- Ramoan
- Rathlin Island

== See also ==
- List of baronies of Northern Ireland
