= Derriaghy =

Townland and civil parish near Belfast, Northern Ireland

Coordinates: 54.54°N 6.03°W

Derriaghy: Irish: Doire Achaidh
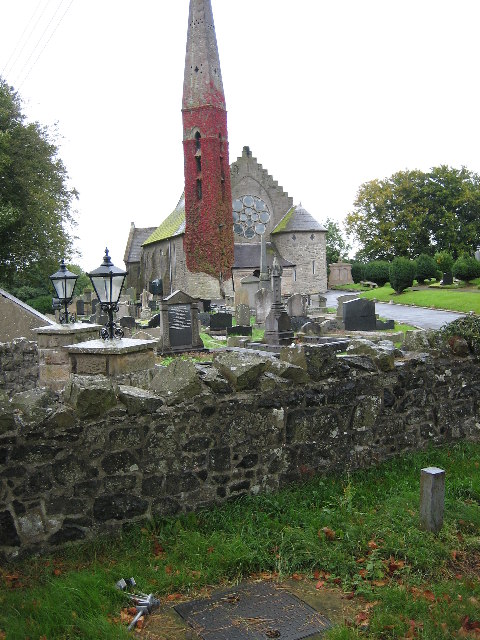
- Christ Church, Church of Ireland, 2005
- District: Lisburn and Castlereagh
- County: County Antrim
- Country: Northern Ireland
- Sovereign state: United Kingdom
- Post town: Belfast
- Postcode district: BT17
- Dialling code: 028
- Police: Northern Ireland
- Fire: Northern Ireland
- Ambulance: Northern Ireland

Derriaghy, (/ˌdɛrɪˈæxi/; also known as Derryaghy) (from Irish Doire Achaidh, meaning 'oak-wood of the field'), is a townland (of 538 acres) and civil parish in County Antrim, Northern Ireland, 5.5 miles (9 km) south-west of Belfast city centre. The townland is situated in the historic barony of Belfast Upper and the civil parish covers areas of both Belfast Upper and the barony of Massereene Upper.

== History ==
The listed Church of Ireland building Christ Church in Derriaghy occupies the site of an early church. The earliest documentary reference to a church in Derriaghy is in a letter from Pope Innocent III in 1204. The Taxation of Down, Connor and Dromore of 1306-07 also mentions a church in Derriaghy. The records of an Inquisition in Antrim in 1605 indicate that the parish church of Dirreraghie was in some disrepair.

== Churches ==
- Christ Church, Church of Ireland listed building
- Derriaghy Gospel Hall
- St. Patrick's Roman Catholic Church

== Transport ==
Derriaghy railway station was opened in 1907 and is between Dunmurry and Lambeg stations on the main Belfast-Dublin railway line. It was closed on March 1, 1953, and reopened on April 30, 1956, in response to numerous requests.

== Sport ==
- Derriaghy Cricket Club, founded in 1920 and plays in the NCU Senior League
- Derriaghy Cricket Club F.C., football club founded in 1982 that plays in the Northern Amateur Football League
- Éire Óg Derriaghy GAC, GAA club founded in 1932 that draws its membership from Derriaghy, Finaghy and Dunmurry

== People ==
- Henrietta Gayer (1700s – 25 March 1814), early Methodist leader who had John Wesley and other preachers stay at her house
- Cosslett Ó Cuinn (1907 – 1995), Church of Ireland minister and poet, theologian, critic and biblical scholar who translated the New Testament into Irish, born in Derriaghy
- Philip Skelton (1707 – 1787), Protestant clergyman and writer, born in Derriaghy

== Civil parish of Derriaghy ==
=== Townlands ===
The civil parish contains the following townlands:

- Aghalislone
- Aghnahough
- Ballycollin
- Ballymacoss
- Ballymacward Lower
- Ballymacward Upper
- Bovolcan
- Clogher (Derriaghy)
- Derryaghy
- Drumankelly
- Islandkelly
- Killeaton
- Kilmakee
- Lagmore
- Magheralave (Belfast Upper)
- Magheralave (Massereene Upper)
- Mullaghglass
- Poleglass
- Slievenacloy (Belfast Upper)
- Slievenacloy (Massereene Upper)
- Slievenagravery
- Tornagrough
- Tornaroy
- White Mountain

== See also ==
- List of townlands of County Antrim
- List of civil parishes of County Antrim
