= Lisnarick, County Antrim =

Lisnarick: Irish: Lios na Reach
- County: County Antrim
- Country: Northern Ireland
- Sovereign state: United Kingdom
- Police: Northern Ireland
- Fire: Northern Ireland
- Ambulance: Northern Ireland

Lisnarick (from Irish Lios na Reach, meaning 'fort of the selling') is a townland of 101 acres in County Antrim, Northern Ireland. It is situated in the historic barony of Dunluce Lower and the civil parish of Ballyrashane.

== See also ==
- List of townlands in County Antrim
- Lisnarick, County Fermanagh
