= Derrykeighan =

Village in County Antrim, Northern Ireland

Derrykeighan: Irish: Doire Chaocháin
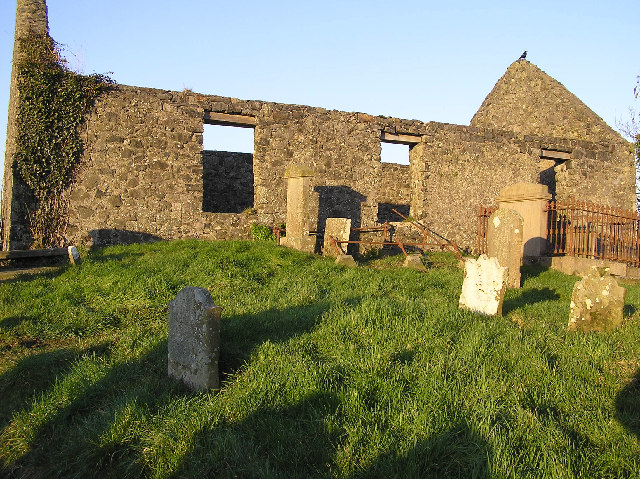
- The Old Church, Derrykeighan, in 2006
- County: County Antrim
- Country: Northern Ireland
- Sovereign state: United Kingdom
- Postcode district: BT53
- Dialling code: 028
- UK Parliament: North Antrim
- NI Assembly: North Antrim

Derrykeighan (from Irish Doire Chaocháin, meaning 'Caochán’s oak-wood') is a village, civil parish and townland (of 161 acres) in County Antrim, Northern Ireland, 4 miles (7.5 km) north of Ballymoney. It is situated in the historic barony of Dunluce Lower.

== History ==
The site of the medieval parish church, and also of an early church, is marked by the ruins of a later church in Derrykeighan.

== Civil parish of Derrykeighan ==
The civil parish covers includes the village of Dervock.

=== Townlands ===
The civil parish contains the following townlands:

- Aghancrossy
- Ballydivity
- Ballyhibistock Lower
- Ballyhibistock Upper
- Ballynafeigh
- Ballynarry Upper
- Ballyratahan
- Ballyratahan
- Beerhill
- Bellisle
- Carnaff
- Carncoggy
- Carncullagh Lower
- Carncullagh Middle
- Carncullagh Upper
- Carnfeogue
- Carracloghy
- Chathamhall
- Coole
- Deepstown
- Derrykeighan
- Dervock
- Drumcrottagh
- Glebe
- Gracehill
- Islandahoe
- Knockanboy
- Knockavallan
- Lisconnan
- Lisnabraugh
- Livery Lower
- Livery Upper
- Mostragee
- Mullaghduff
- Stroan Lower
- Stroan Upper
- Tullybane

== See also ==
- List of townlands in County Antrim
- List of civil parishes of County Antrim
- List of towns and villages in Northern Ireland
