= Alec Cooke, Baron Cooke of Islandreagh =

The Right Honourable The Lord Cooke of Islandreagh OBE DL
- Lord Cooke of Islandreagh

Member of the House of Lords
- Lord Temporal
- Life peerage 11 August 1992 – 13 November 2007

Personal details
- Born: 18 October 1920
- Died: 13 November 2007 (aged 87)

Victor Alexander Cooke, Baron Cooke of Islandreagh, OBE, DL (18 October 1920 – 13 November 2007), was an Ulster Unionist Party politician in Northern Ireland.

The son of Victor and Alice Cooke, he was educated in Marlborough College and graduated from Trinity College, Cambridge with a Master of Arts in mechanical science. He served as a Royal Navy lieutenant between 1940 and 1946. He was chairman of Henry R Ayton Ltd, Belfast, between 1946 and 1989.

Cooke was chairman of the Belfast Savings Bank in 1963 and of Harland and Wolff (1970–1987). Lord Cooke was Director of Northern Ireland Airports from 1970 to 1985. He was a Senator in the former Parliament of Northern Ireland from 1961 to 1968 and was the last member to remain politically active. In 1973, he was appointed High Sheriff of Antrim.

Cooke became a deputy lieutenant of County Antrim in 1971 and was invested as an officer of the Order of the British Empire in 1981. He was created a life peer as Baron Cooke of Islandreagh, of Islandreagh in the County of Antrim, on 11 August 1992.

He married Alison Sheila Casement (daughter of Maj-Gen Francis Casement) in 1951 and had two sons (Michael John Alexander (born 1955) and James Victor Francis (born 1960)) and one daughter (Victoria Sally (born 1956), now The Hon. Mrs Nicholas Yonge). Lord Cooke of Islandreagh died following a long illness, aged 87.

== See also ==
- List of Northern Ireland Members of the House of Lords
