= Kilraghts =

Civil parish in County Antrim, Northern Ireland

Kilraghts (Irish: Cill Reachtais) is a civil parish and townland (of 424 acres) in County Antrim, Northern Ireland. It is situated in the historic barony of Dunluce Upper. It is 4 miles (6 km) east of Ballymoney.

== Townlands ==
Kilraghts civil parish contains the following townlands:

- Artiferrall
- Ballylough
- Carnageeragh
- Crosstagherty
- Drumaqueran
- Drumbest
- Dungorbery
- Ganaby
- Islandmore
- Kilmoyangey
- Kilraghts
- Knockanavary
- Legacurry
- Lisboy
- Magheraboy Lower
- Magheraboy Upper
- Smallquarter
- Toberbilly

== See also ==
- List of civil parishes of County Antrim
