= William Magee Hunter =

- Born: 1834; County Antrim, Ireland
- Died: 7 Nov 1868 aged 34; Moturoa, Taranaki, New Zealand
- Burial place: Heads Road Cemetery, Gonville, New Zealand
- Military career
- Allegiance: United Kingdom
- Rank: Major
- Unit: Armed Constabulary

William Magee Hunter (c. 1834 – 7 November 1868) was a New Zealand soldier. He was born in County Antrim, Ireland on c. 1834. He is remembered for leading the Pākehā forces against Tītokowaru in the New Zealand Wars.
