= Toome Lower =

Toome Lower Tuaim Íochtarach (Irish)
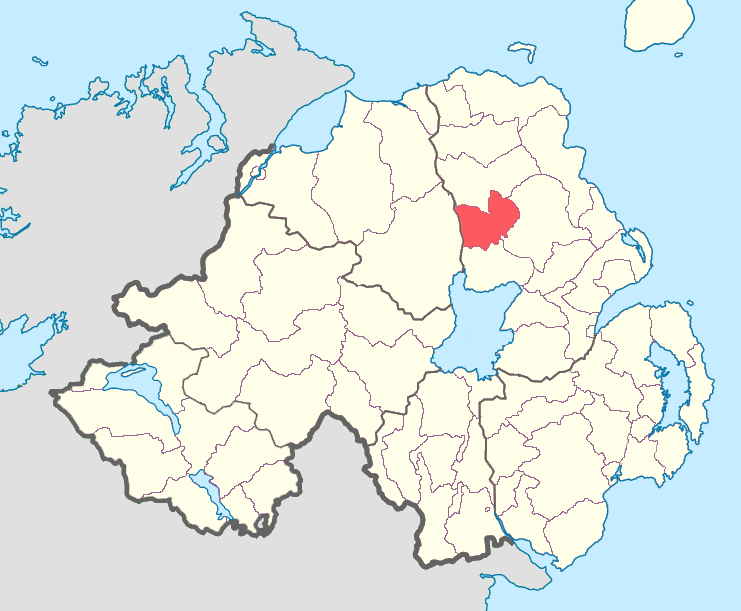
- Location of Toome Lower, County Antrim, Northern Ireland.
- Sovereign state: United Kingdom
- Country: Northern Ireland
- County: Antrim

Toome Lower is a barony in County Antrim, Northern Ireland. It is bordered by four other baronies: Toome Upper to the south; Antrim Lower to the east; Kilconway to the north; and Loughinsholin to the west. Toome Lower also formed part of the medieval territories known as the Route and Clandeboye.

== List of settlements ==
Below is a list of settlements in Toome Lower:

=== Towns ===
- Ahoghill (also part of baronies of Antrim Lower and Toome Upper)
- Antrim (also part of barony of Toome Upper)
- Cullybackey
- Portglenone

=== Population centres ===
- Gracehill
- Killygarn
- Lisrodden

== List of civil parishes ==
Below is a list of civil parishes in Toome Lower:

- Ahoghill
- Craigs
- Kirkinriola
- Portglenone
