= Glenarm Upper =

Barony in County Antrim, Northern Ireland

Glenarm Upper Gleann Arma Uachtarach (Irish)
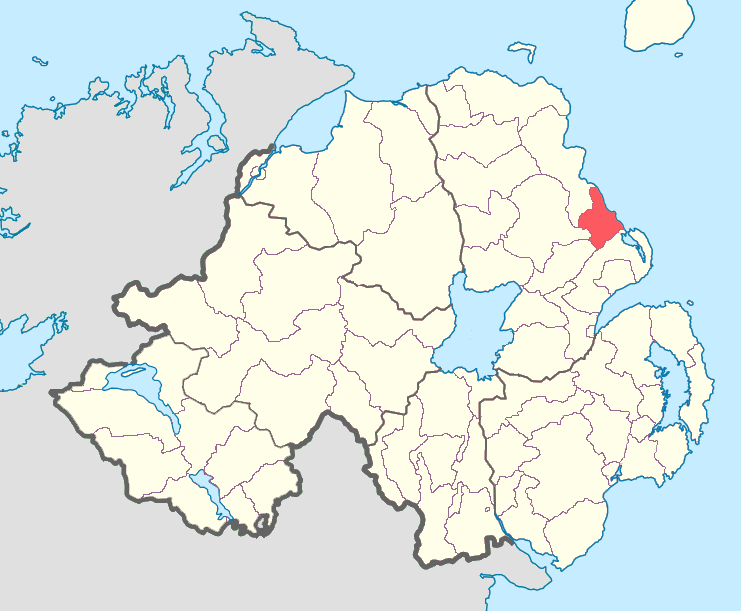
- Location of Glenarm Upper, County Antrim, Northern Ireland.
- Sovereign state: United Kingdom
- Country: Northern Ireland
- County: Antrim

Glenarm Upper is a barony in County Antrim, Northern Ireland. To its east runs the east-Antrim coast, and it is bordered by four other baronies: Glenarm Lower to the north; Antrim Lower to the west; Antrim Upper to the south-west; and Belfast Lower to the south. Chaine Tower, situated at the entrance to Larne Lough, is located within Glenarm Upper.

== List of settlements ==
Below is a list of settlements in Glenarm Upper:

=== Towns ===
- Larne (Glenarm Upper portion)

=== Villages and population centres ===
- Ballygalley
- Craigy Hill
- Kilwaughter
- Millbrook
- West End

== List of civil parishes ==
Below is a list of civil parishes in Glenarm Upper:

- Carncastle
- Kilwaughter
- Larne
