= Antrim Lower =

Barony in County Antrim, Northern Ireland

Antrim Lower Aontroim Íochtarach (Irish)
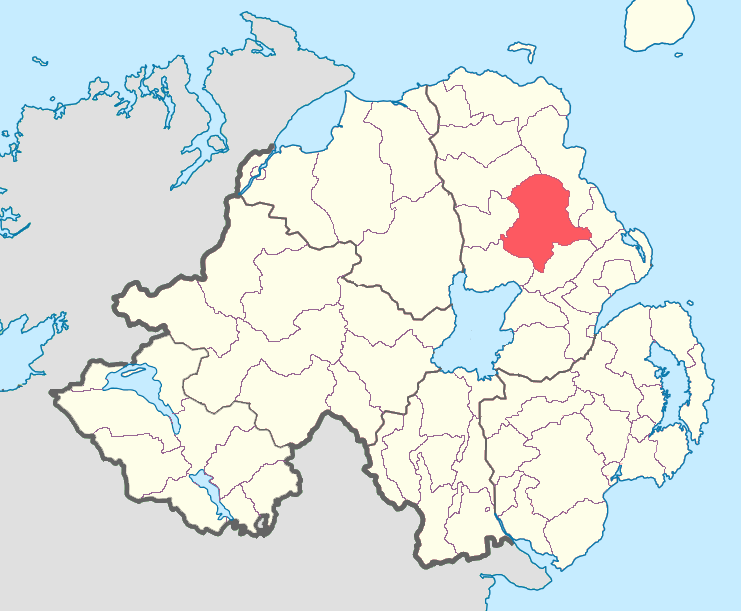
- Location of Antrim Lower, County Antrim, Northern Ireland.
- Coordinates: 54°52′16″N 6°08′00″W
- Sovereign state: United Kingdom
- Country: Northern Ireland
- County: Antrim

Antrim Lower is a barony in County Antrim, Northern Ireland. It is bordered by six other baronies: Antrim Upper to the south; Toome Upper to the south-west; Toome Lower to the west; Kilconway to the north-west; Glenarm Lower to the north-east; and Glenarm Upper to the east. The River Braid flows through this barony.

== List of main settlements ==
Below is a list of settlements in Antrim Lower:

=== Towns ===
- Ballymena

=== Villages ===
- Ahoghill
- Broughshane
- Kells

=== Hamlets/population centres ===
- Martinstown

== List of civil parishes ==
Below is a list of civil parishes in Antrim Lower:

- Ahoghill (partly in baronies of Toome Lower, Toome Upper and Kilconway)
- Ballyclug
- Connor
- Glenwhirry
- Racavan
- Skerry
