= Dervock =

Village in County Antrim, Northern Ireland

Coordinates: 55.12346°N 6.46899°W

Dervock: Irish: Dearbhóg/Dairbheog (little oak grove)
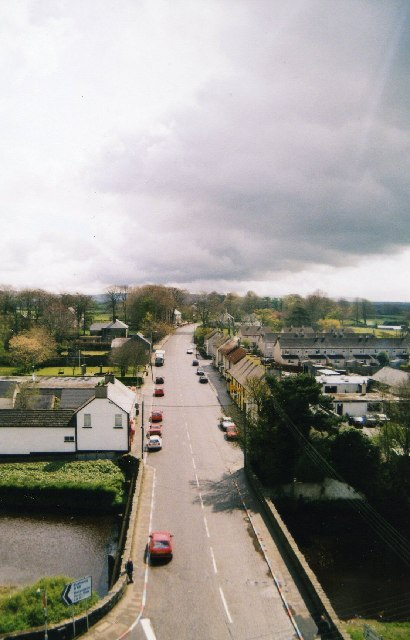

- Location within Northern Ireland
- Population: 714 (2011 Census)
- Irish grid reference: C978317
  - Belfast: 51 miles
- District: Causeway Coast and Glens
- County: County Antrim
- Country: Northern Ireland
- Sovereign state: United Kingdom
- Post town: BALLYMONEY
- Postcode district: BT53
- Dialling code: 028
- UK Parliament: North Antrim
- NI Assembly: North Antrim

Dervock (from Irish Dearbhóg or Dairbheog) is a small village and townland (of 132 acres) in County Antrim, Northern Ireland. It is about 3.5 miles (6 km) northeast of Ballymoney, on the banks of the River Bush. It is situated in the civil parish of Derrykeighan and the historic barony of Dunluce Lower. It had a population of 714 people (302 households) in the 2011 census.

== Features ==
The village includes a number of commercial businesses, a primary school and doctor's surgery, as well as recreational and community facilities.

The North Irish Horse Inn, a listed building, named after a famous British Army regiment, the namesake North Irish Horse, and has military memorabilia on display inside, and there is also a remembrance fountain built in 1878.

== Demography ==
Dervock is classified as a village by the Northern Ireland Statistics and Research Agency (NISRA) (i.e. with a population between 600 and 1,000 people). On census day in 2011 (29 April 2011), there were 711 people living in Dervock. Of these:

- 22.8% were aged under 16 years and 13.3% were aged 60 and over
- 47.9% of the population were male and 52.1% were female.
- 1.2% were from a Catholic background and 98.8% were from a Protestant background.

== Transport ==
Dervock railway station opened on 18 October 1880 but closed on 3 July 1950. It was on the Ballycastle Railway, a narrow gauge railway which ran 17 miles connecting Ballycastle to Ballymoney, on the Belfast and Northern Counties Railway (BNCR), later Northern Counties Committee (NCC), main line to Derry~Londonderry.

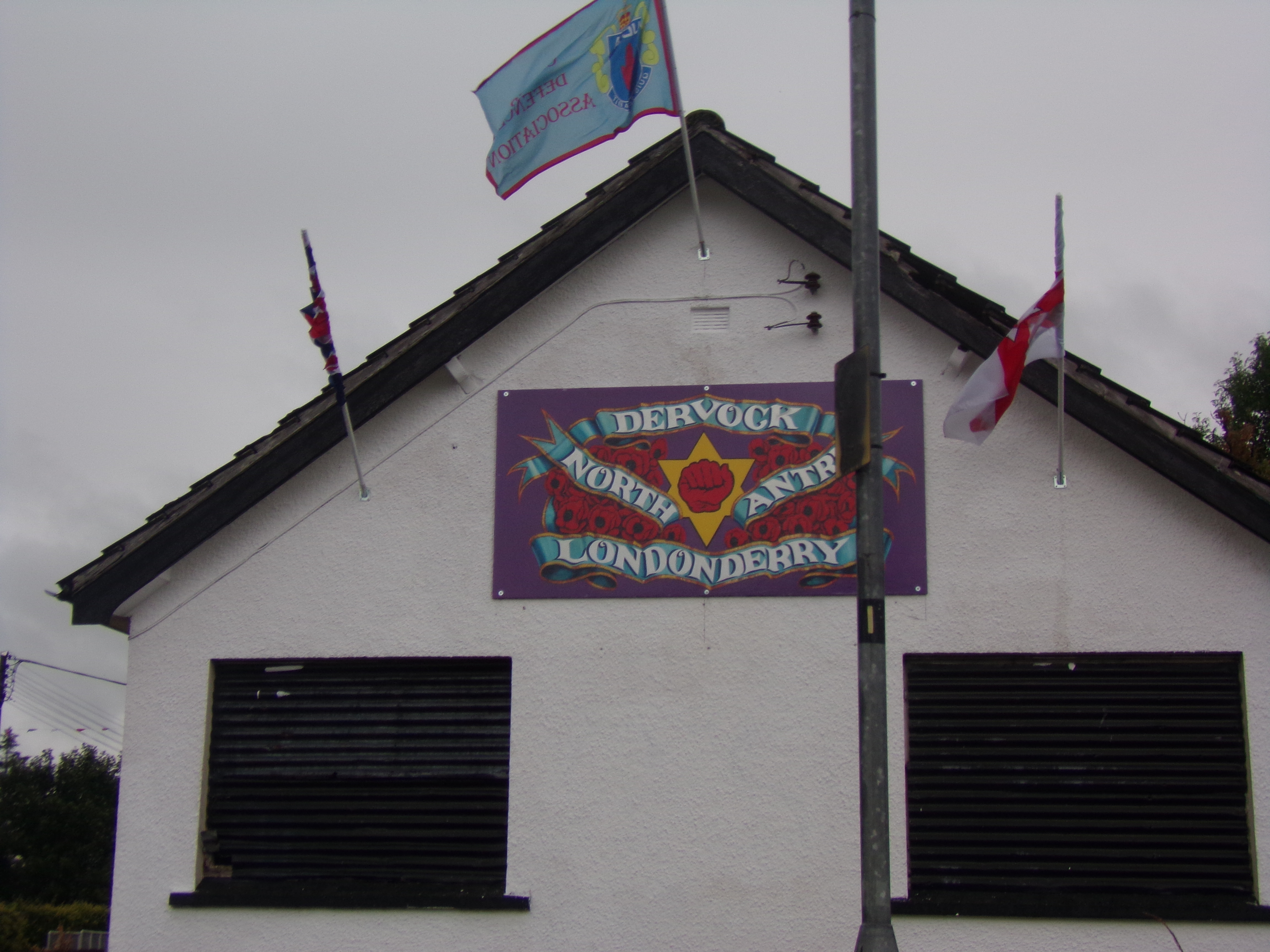
A wall sign in Dervock showing support for the North Antrim and Londonderry brigade of the UDA.

== People ==
- Ken McArthur won a gold medal for running the marathon whilst representing his adopted country of South Africa at the Olympic games in 1912 held in Stockholm, Sweden. There is now an avenue in Dervock named in his honour.
- Richard Smyth (1826–1878), Presbyterian minister, and MP for County Londonderry
- Thomas McAfee (1866–1947), Presbyterian minister, member of the Legislative Assembly of Saskatchewan 1925–1929

== See also ==
- List of towns and villages in Northern Ireland
- List of townlands in County Antrim
