= John O'Kane Murray =

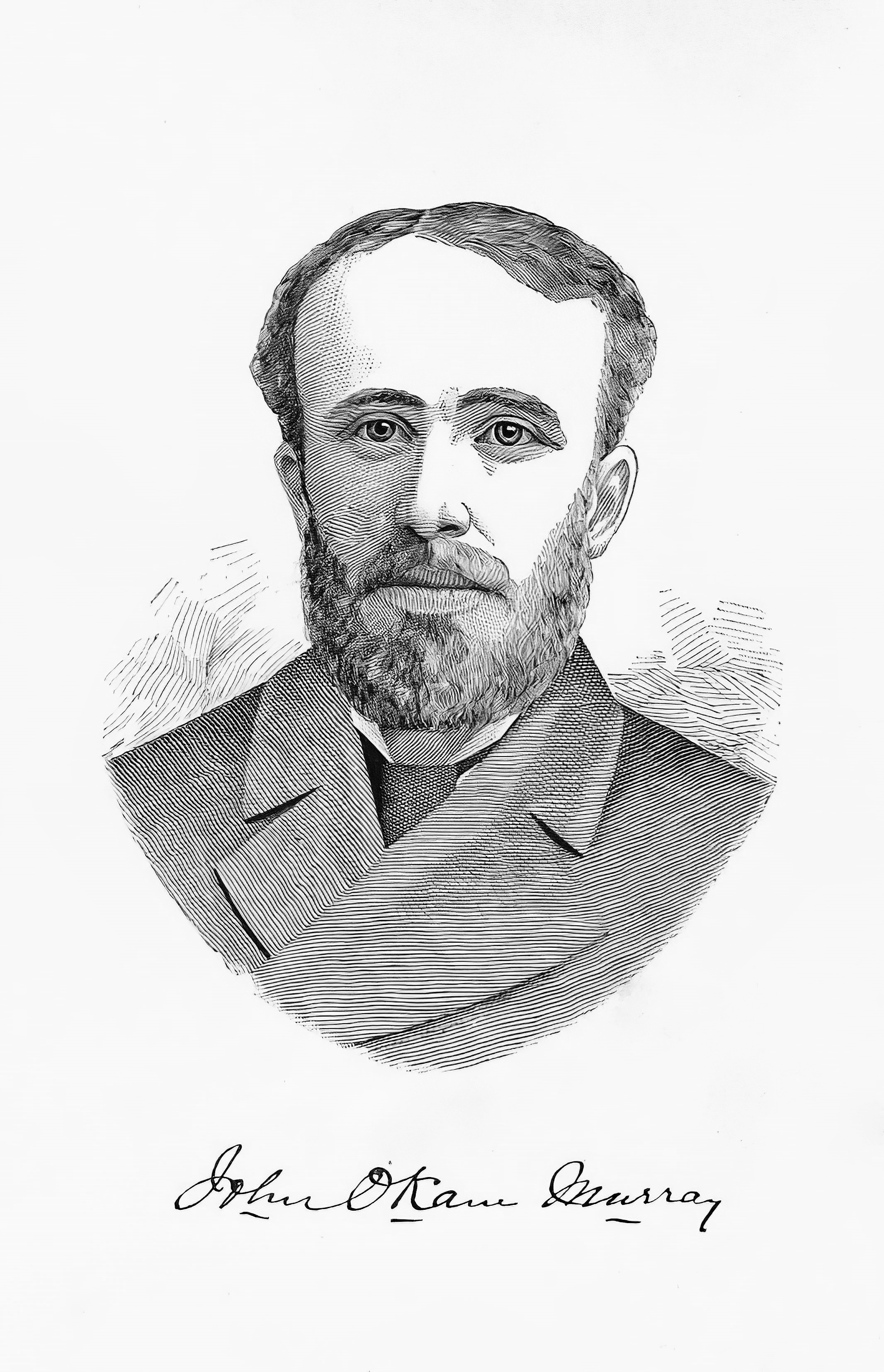
John O'Kane Murray

John O'Kane Murray (12 December 1847 – 30 July 1885) was a physician and author. He was born in County Antrim, Ireland, in 1847. He came with his family to the United States in 1856. He attended St. John's College (now Fordham University), and became a physician. Murray wrote books on church history, hagiography, Irish poetry, English literature, and history. He died in Chicago in 1885.
