= Slieve True =

Hill in Northern Ireland

Slieve True (Sliabh an Triúir)

Highest point
- Elevation: 312 m (1,024 ft)
- Prominence: 189 m (620 ft)
- Listing: Marilyn
- Coordinates: 54.731825°N 5.909761°W

Naming
- English translation: Hill of the three
- Language of name: Irish

Geography
- Location: County Antrim, Northern Ireland
- OSI/OSNI grid: J347891
- Topo map: OSNI Discoverer 29

Slieve True or Slievetrue (from Irish Sliabh an Triúir 'hill of the three') is a 312 m-high (1,024 ft) hill in County Antrim, Northern Ireland. It is near Knockagh Monument and Monkstown, about 6 km (3.7 mi) north of Belfast.

Slieve True derives its name from three standing stones (known as "The Three Brothers") about one-half mile (0.80 km) southwest of the summit. These have since been integrated into a field wall. There is also a cairn in the area.

In May 2013, Irish electricity company Gaelectric opened a wind farm in the Carn Hill area of Slievetrue, consisting of six wind turbines at a total cost of £20 million.
