= Dunadry =

Hamlet in County Antrim, Northern Ireland

Dunadry: Irish: Dún Eadradh
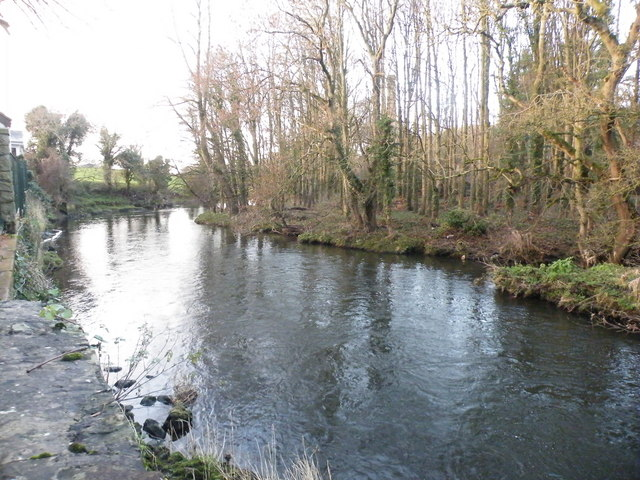
- Dunadry River near Old Mill in 2008

- Location within Northern Ireland
- Population: 430 (2011 Census)
  - Belfast: 11 mi (18 km)
- District: Antrim and Newtownabbey
- County: County Antrim
- Country: Northern Ireland
- Sovereign state: United Kingdom
- Post town: ANTRIM
- Postcode district: BT41
- Dialling code: 028
- UK Parliament: South Antrim
- NI Assembly: South Antrim

Dunadry (from Irish Dún Eadradh, meaning 'middle fort') is a hamlet and townland (of 657 acres) 3 miles (5 km) from Antrim in County Antrim, Northern Ireland. It is situated in the civil parish of Grange of Nilteen and the historic barony of Antrim Upper. It is within the Antrim and Newtownabbey Borough Council area. It had a population of 430 people (190 households) in the 2011 Census. (2001 Census: 237 people).

== History ==
Around 1251 the name of Dunadry townland was recorded as Dunedergel. The Irish Dún Eadradh may reinterpret an earlier name, Dún Eadarghabhal (fort between forks), referring to a fort which formerly stood in the junction between the Six Mile Water River and the Rathmore Burn. The 1838 Ordnance Survey Memoir records Dunadry as taking its name from a fort which stood about 100 yards to the north of the village.

The site of an ancient church and graveyard, formerly the parish church of the Grange of Nilteen, lies in the townland. In the Papal Taxation c.1306 the church is recorded as Ecclesia de Drumnedergal. The Ordnance Survey Memoir of 1838 records, however, that the foundations of the church were wholly removed and the burial ground cultivated.

== Transport ==
Dunadry railway station was opened on 11 April 1848 but closed on 20 September 1954.

== See also ==
- List of towns and villages in Northern Ireland
- List of townlands in County Antrim
