= Kilconway =

Barony in County Antrim, Northern Ireland

Kilconway Coill Uí Chonmhaí (Irish)
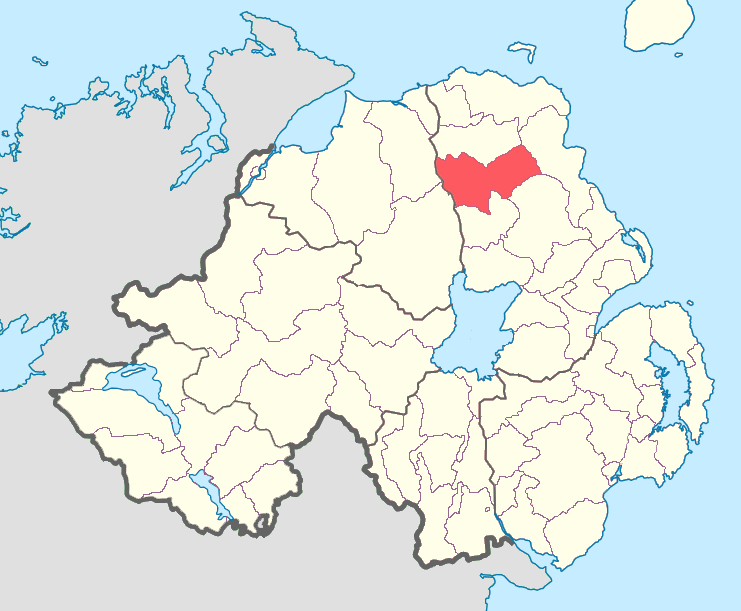
- Location of Kilconway, County Antrim, Northern Ireland.
- Sovereign state: United Kingdom
- Country: Northern Ireland
- County: Antrim

Kilconway (from Irish Coill Uí Chonmhaí) is a barony in County Antrim, Northern Ireland. It is bordered by six other baronies: Dunluce Upper to the north; Glenarm Lower to the east; Antrim Lower to the south-east; Toome Lower to the south; Loughinsholin to the south-west; and Coleraine to the north-east. Kilconway also formed part of the medieval territory known as the Route. Springmount Bog is located within the barony.

== List of settlements ==
Below is a list of settlements in Kilconway:

=== Villages ===
- Cargan
- Cloughmills
- Dunloy
- Rasharkin

=== Population centres ===
- Clogh
- Finvoy
- Glarryford
- Glenravel
- Killagan
- Loughguile (part in barony of Dunluce Upper)
- Newtown Crommelin

== List of civil parishes ==
Below is a list of civil parishes in Kilconway:

- Ballymoney (also partly in barony of Dunluce Upper, County Antrim and North East Liberties of Coleraine, County Londonderry)
- Craigs (split with barony of Toome Lower)
- Dunaghy
- Finvoy
- Grange of Dundermot
- Killagan (split with barony of Dunluce Upper)
- Loughguille (split with barony of Dunluce Upper)
- Rasharkin
- Newtown Crommelin
