= North East Liberties of Coleraine =

Barony in County Londonderry, Northern Ireland

North East Liberties of Coleraine Líbeartaí Thoir Thuaidh Chúil Raithin(Irish)
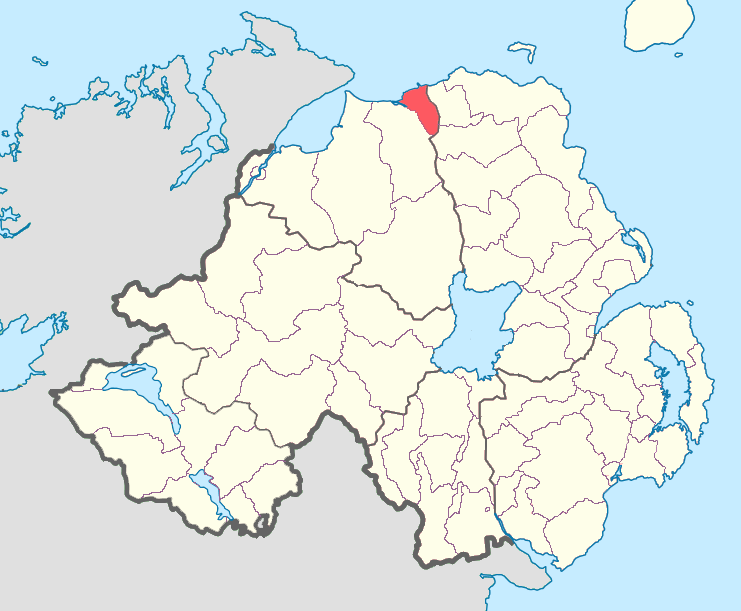
- Location of North East Liberties of Coleraine, County Londonderry, Northern Ireland.
- Sovereign state: United Kingdom
- Country: Northern Ireland
- County: Londonderry

The North East Liberties of Coleraine (named after Coleraine town) is a barony in County Londonderry, Northern Ireland. It borders the north-eastern coastline of County Londonderry and is bordered by three other baronies: Coleraine to the west and south-west; Dunluce Lower to the east; and Dunluce Upper to the south-east. The North East Liberties of Coleraine formed the north-western part of the medieval territory known as the Route.

The area was part of County Antrim from 1584 to 1613, when it became part of the new County Londonderry.

== List of major settlements ==
- Coleraine (east of the River Bann)
- Portstewart

== List of civil parishes ==
Below is a list of civil parishes in the North East Liberties of Coleraine:

- Ballyaghran
- Ballymoney (also partly in baronies of Dunluce Upper and Kilconway in County Antrim)
- Ballywillan (split with barony of Dunluce Lower)
- Ballyrashane (also partly in barony of Dunluce Lower)
- Coleraine
- Kildollagh
