= Dunluce Upper =

Barony in County Antrim, Northern Ireland

Dunluce Upper Dún Libhse Uachtarach (Irish)
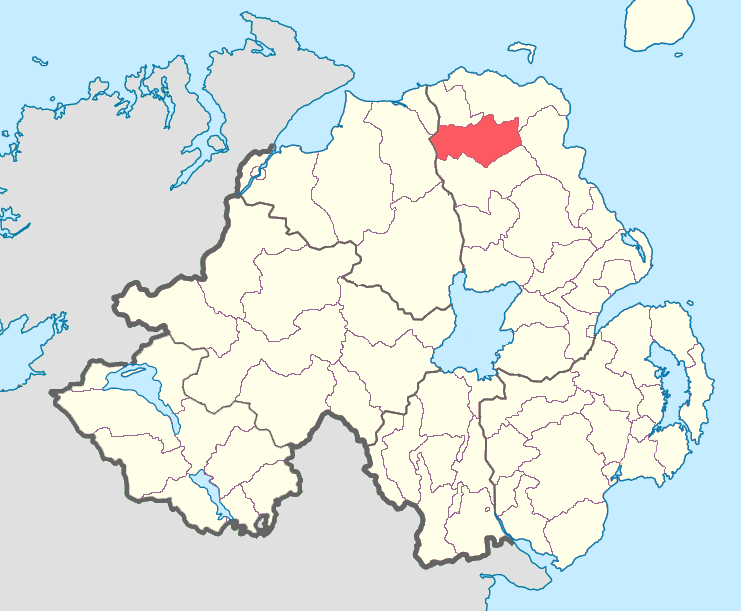
- Location of Dunluce Upper, County Antrim, Northern Ireland.
- Sovereign state: United Kingdom
- Country: Northern Ireland
- County: Antrim

Dunluce Upper is a barony in County Antrim, Northern Ireland. It is bordered by six other baronies: Dunluce Lower to the north; Cary to the north-east; North East Liberties of Coleraine to the north-west; Coleraine to the west; Kilconway to the south; and Glenarm Lower to the east. Dunluce Upper also formed part of the medieval territory known as the Route.

== List of settlements ==
Below is a list of settlements in Dunluce Upper:

=== Towns ===
- Ballymoney

=== Population centres ===
- Corkey
- Glenbush
- Loughguile (part in barony of Kilconway)

== List of civil parishes ==
Below is a list of civil parishes in Dunluce Upper:

- Armoy (split with barony of Cary)
- Ballymoney (also partly in barony of Kilconway, County Antrim and North East Liberties of Coleraine, County Londonderry)
- Killagan (split with barony of Kilconway)
- Kilraghts
- Loughguile (split with barony of Kilconway)
