= Glenarm Lower =

Barony in County Antrim, Northern Ireland

Glenarm Lower Gleann Arma Íochtarach (Irish)
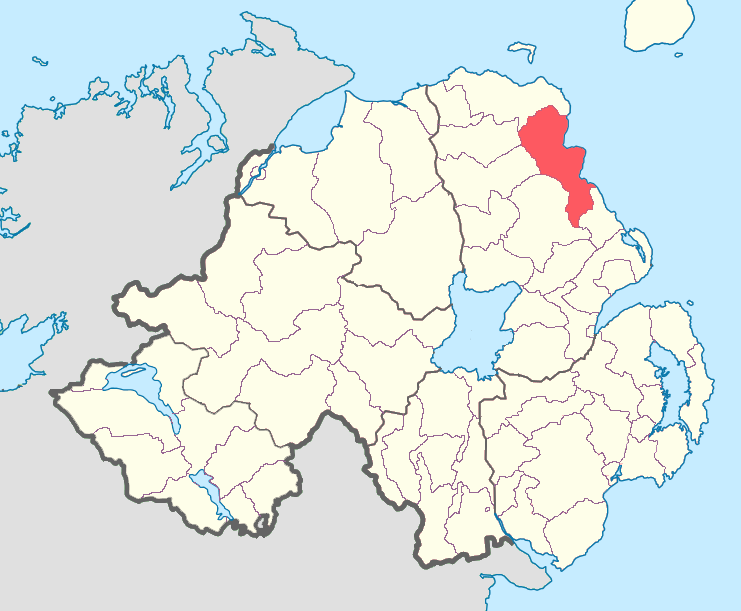
- Location of Glenarm Lower, County Antrim, Northern Ireland.
- Sovereign state: United Kingdom
- Country: Northern Ireland
- County: Antrim

Glenarm Lower is a barony in County Antrim, Northern Ireland. To its east runs the east-Antrim coast, and it is bordered by five other baronies: Cary to the north; Dunluce Lower and Kilconway to the west; Antrim Lower to the south-west; and Glenarm Upper to the south-east.

== Geographical features ==
Geographical features of Glenarm Lower include:

- Lurigethan hill
- Collin Top, Tievebulliagh, and Trostan mountains
- Glencloy valley

== List of settlements ==
Below is a list of settlements in Glenarm Lower:

=== Villages ===
- Carnlough
- Cushendall
- Waterfoot
- Glenarm

=== Hamlets and population centres ===
- Carnalbanagh Sheddings
- Feystown
- Garronpoint
- Straidkelly

== List of civil parishes ==
Below is a list of civil parishes in Glenarm Lower:

- Ardclinis
- Grange of Inispollen
- Grange of Layd
- Layd
- Tickmacrevan
