= Massereene Lower =

Massereene Lower Mása Ríona Íochtarach (Irish)
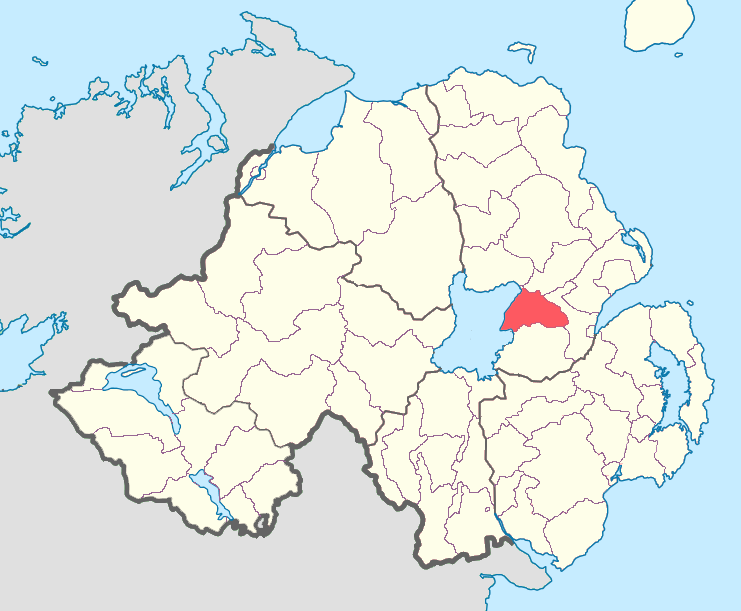
- Location of Massereene Lower, County Antrim, Northern Ireland.
- Sovereign state: United Kingdom
- Country: Northern Ireland
- County: Antrim

Massereene Lower is a barony in County Antrim, Northern Ireland. To its west lies Lough Neagh, and it is bordered by four other baronies: Massereene Upper to the south; Belfast Upper to the east; Antrim Upper to the north; and Toome Upper to the north-west.

== List of settlements ==
Below is a list of settlements in Massereene Lower:

=== Towns ===
- Muckamore

=== Population centres ===
- Aldergrove
- Diamond
- Killead
- Loanends
- Nutt's Corner

== List of civil parishes ==
Below is a list of civil parishes in Massereene Lower:

- Grange of Muckamore
- Killead

== Archaeology ==
The barony contains the largest concentration of ringforts in Ireland, with three ringforts per square kilometre.
