= Coleraine (barony) =

Barony in County Londonderry, Northern Ireland

Coleraine Cúil Rathain (Irish) Cowlrain or Cowlraine (Scots)
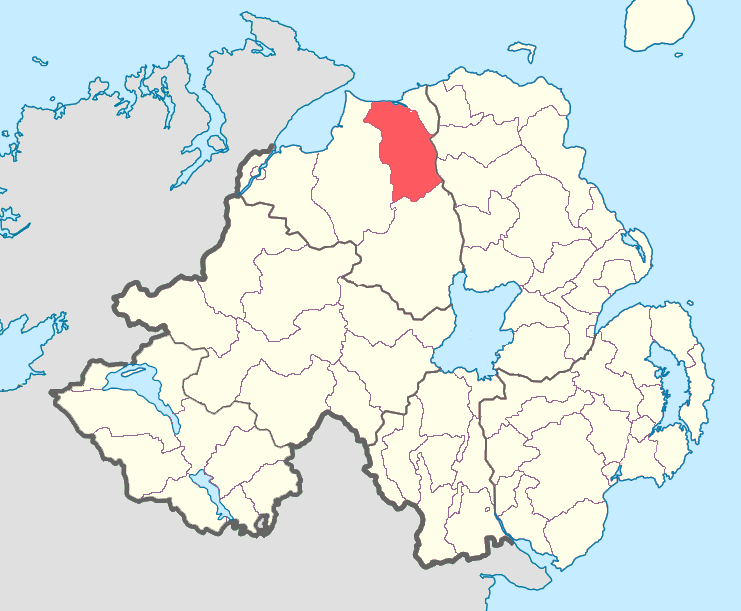
- Location of Coleraine, County Londonderry, Northern Ireland.
- Sovereign state: United Kingdom
- Country: Northern Ireland
- County: Londonderry

Coleraine (named after Coleraine town) is a barony in the north-east of County Londonderry in Northern Ireland. It connects to the north-Londonderry coastline, and is bordered by five other baronies: Keenaght to the west; Loughinsholin to the south; North East Liberties of Coleraine, Dunluce Upper, and the Kilconway to the east. Before its creation it was once a territory known as "Firnacreeve".

The largest settlement in the barony is the town of Coleraine, which also crosses into the North East Liberties of Coleraine.

== History ==
Before its creation, the barony of Coleraine was a region known as Firnacreeve, or simply "the Creeve", a territory ruled at an early date by the Airgiallan people of Fir na Craoibhe (English: men of the tree/branch). At some point another Airgillian people known as the Fir Li (claimed to be descended from Colla Uais) came to dominance in the region between the River Moyola and the Camus (south of Coleraine), covering over half the territory of Firnacreeve. The Fir Li would eventually fall under the domination of the Cenél nEóghain by the 9th century, with many being driven east across the River Bann.

The Cenél mBinnigh and later Clan Conchobhair, both of the Cenél nEóghain migrated to the Creeve. By the beginning of the 12th century the Ó Catháin (English: O'Kane), a sept of the Cenél nEóghain, had risen to dominance over the territories of Keenaght and the Creeve by subjugating the Ó Conchobhair (English: O'Connor) of the Cianachta Glenn Geimin) and the Fir na Craoibhe. Along with the territory of Tirkeeran; Keenaght and Firnacreeve would form the basis of Tircahan or Cathanaght both signifying "O'Cahans Country" and later County Coleraine.

=== References in the Annals ===
In the Annals, Fir na Craoibhe is noted by various names such as; Craebh, Craoibhe, Craibh, Firna-craibhe, and so on:

- M1138, Raghnall, son of Imhar Ua Cathain, lord of the Craebh, Cianachta, and Fir-Li, fell through treachery and guile, by the Ui-Eoghain of the Valley.
- U1156, Aedh Ua Canannain, king of Cenel-Conaill, was killed by Ua Cathain and by the Men of the Craibh.
- MCB1183, Giolla Críost Ó Cathain, son of the king of Fir na Craoibhe, was killed.
- U1192, The door of the Refectory of the Penitentiary [of Daire] was made by Ua Cathain of the Craib and by the daughter of Ua Inneirghi.
- MCB1197, Conchobhar Ó Cathain, king of Fir na Craoibhe and Cianachta, fell.
- U1206, Maghnus Ua Cathain, son of the king of Ciannachta and Fir-na-craibhe, tower of championship and courage of the North, fell by the wound of an arrow.
- U1213, Ferghal Ua Cathain, king of Ciannachta and Firna-craibhe, was killed by the Foreigners.
- U1247, Eachmarcach Ua Catha[i]n, king of Ciannachta and of Fir-na-craibhe, was killed by Maghnus Ua Catha[i]n, on his going upon a foray to the latter, to Airther-muighi in Dal-riatai.

=== From Fir na Craoibhe to Coleraine ===
When the baronies of Ulster were being created by the English around 1585, the general manner was to name it after the principal town or castle lying within the area, in which they held their court, baron, and jail. This resulted in Firnacreeve being renamed as the barony of Coleraine, just as Kinel-Ferady was renamed Clogher.

== List of main settlements ==
- Articlave
- Castlerock
- Coleraine (west of the River Bann)
- Garvagh
- Macosquin

== List of civil parishes ==
Below is a list of civil parishes in the barony of Coleraine:

- Aghadowey
- Agivey
- Desertoghill
- Dunboe
- Errigal
- Formoyle
- Killowen
- Kilrea (split with the barony of Loughinsholin)
- Macosquin
- Tamlaght O'Crilly (split with the barony of Loughinsholin)
