= Belfast Upper =

Belfast Upper Béal Feirste Uachtarach (Irish)
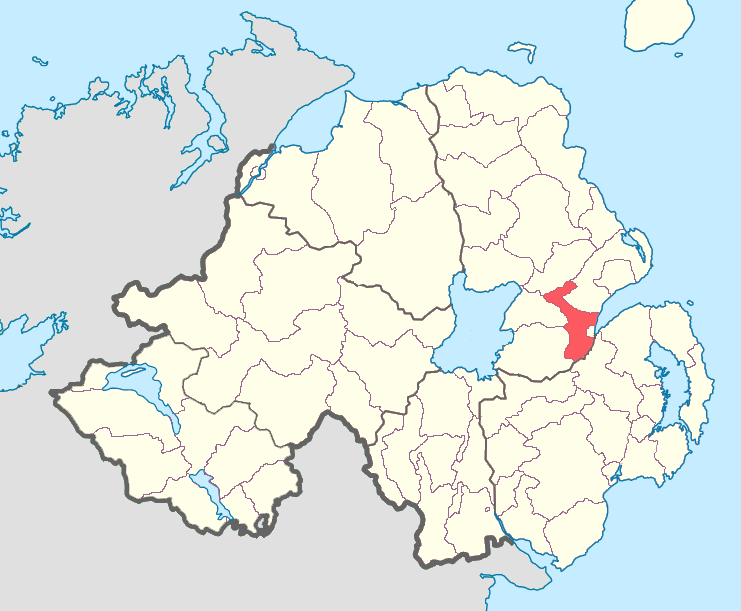
- Location of Belfast Upper, County Antrim, Northern Ireland.
- Sovereign state: United Kingdom
- Country: Northern Ireland
- County: Antrim

Belfast Upper is a barony in County Antrim, Northern Ireland. To its east lies the barony of Belfast and Belfast Lough, and it is bordered by five other baronies: Belfast Lower to the north-east; Antrim Upper to the north-west; Massereene Lower to the west; Massereene Upper to the south-west; and Castlereagh Upper to the south. The Forth River flows through both Belfast Upper and Lower. The most prominent hills in the barony are Black Hill and Lyle's Hill.

== List of settlements ==
Below is a list of settlements in Belfast Upper:

=== Cities ===
- Belfast (split with barony of Belfast Lower)

=== Towns and villages ===
- Lambeg
- Milltown
- Templepatrick

=== Population centres ===
- Andersonstown
- Ballysillan
- Carr's Glen
- Cavehill
- Donegall Pass
- Deerpark
- Falls
- Finaghy
- Fortwilliam
- Glenard
- Holylands
- Jennymount
- Parkmount
- Riverdale
- Sandy Row
- Seymour Hill
- Shankill
- Suffolk
- Village
- Windsor
- Whiterock
- Woodvale

== List of civil parishes ==
Below is a list of civil parishes in Belfast Upper:

- Ballymartin (split with barony of Belfast Lower)
- Derriaghy (also partly in barony of Massereene Upper)
- Drumbeg
- Lambeg (split with barony of Massereene Upper)
- Shankill (split with barony of Belfast Lower)
- Templepatrick (split with barony of Belfast Lower)
