= Lisnarick, County Fermanagh =

Coordinates: 54.477°N 7.699°W

Lisnarick: Irish: Lios na nDaróg
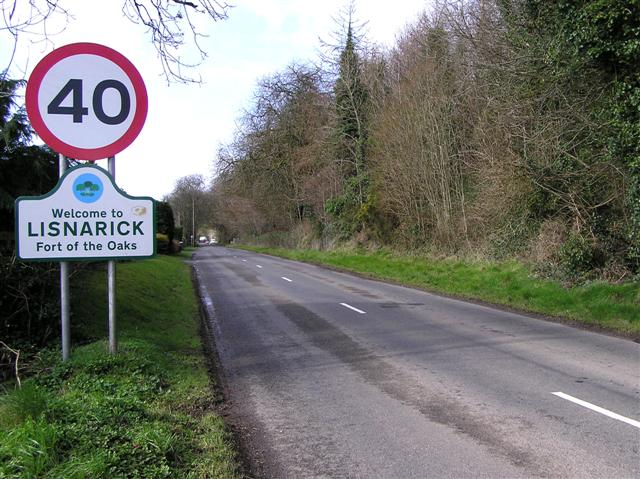

- Location within Northern Ireland
- Population: 203 (2021 Census)
- Irish grid reference: H192588
- District: Fermanagh and Omagh
- County: County Fermanagh
- Country: Northern Ireland
- Sovereign state: United Kingdom
- Post town: ENNISKILLEN
- Postcode district: BT94
- Dialling code: 028, +44 28
- UK Parliament: Fermanagh and South Tyrone
- NI Assembly: Fermanagh and South Tyrone

Lisnarick or Lisnarrick (from Irish Lios na nDaróg, meaning 'fort of the (little) oaks') is a small village in County Fermanagh, Northern Ireland, 4 km west of Irvinestown. It is situated in the civil parish of Derryvullan and historic barony of Lurg. The village was once known as Archdalestown after the nearby Castle Archdale. In the 2021 census it had a population of 203.

The village is mostly housing although there is one multi-purpose store, a restaurant, a filling station and a sub-post office. At the middle of the village is a green with horse chestnut trees and a play park. There is also a rath beside the bridge.

== History ==
Rory Maguire was a leader of the Irish Rebellion of 1641 in Fermanagh, and the burning of Lisnarick on 23 October 1641 was the signal for the rebellion to start. Castle Archdale was also destroyed at the time.

== Places of interest ==
Castle Archdale Country Park is on the main Enniskillen to Kesh road (B82), 1 mile on the Enniskillen side of Lisnarick.

== See also ==
- List of villages in Northern Ireland
- Lisnarick, County Antrim
