= Antrim Upper =

Antrim Upper Aontroim Uachtarach (Irish)
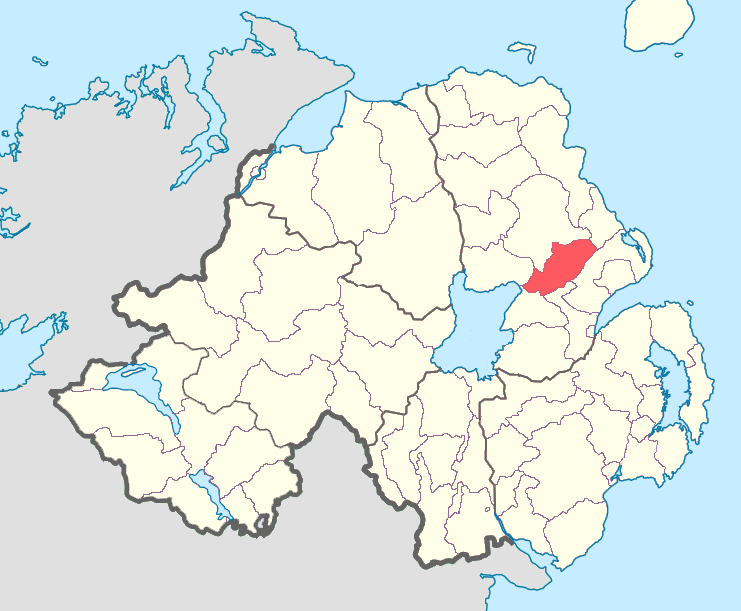
- Location of Antrim Upper, County Antrim, Northern Ireland.
- Coordinates: 54°45′45″N 6°05′07″W
- Sovereign state: United Kingdom
- Country: Northern Ireland
- County: Antrim

Antrim Upper is a barony in County Antrim, Northern Ireland. It is bordered by six other baronies: Antrim Lower to the north; Toome Upper to the west; Massereene Lower to the south-west; Belfast Upper to the south; Belfast Lower to the south-east; and Glenarm Upper to the east.

== List of settlements ==
Below is a list of settlements in Antrim Upper:

=== Towns ===
- Antrim (split with barony of Toome Upper)
- Ballyclare (split with barony of Belfast Lower)

=== Villages ===
- Doagh
- Dunadry
- Parkgate

== List of civil parishes ==
Below is a list of civil parishes in Antrim Upper:

- Antrim (split with barony of Toome Upper)
- Ballycor
- Doagh Grange
- Donegore
- Kilbride
- Grange of Nilteen
- Rashee
