= Dunluce Lower =

Barony in County Antrim, Northern Ireland

Dunluce Lower Dún Libhse Íochtarach (Irish)
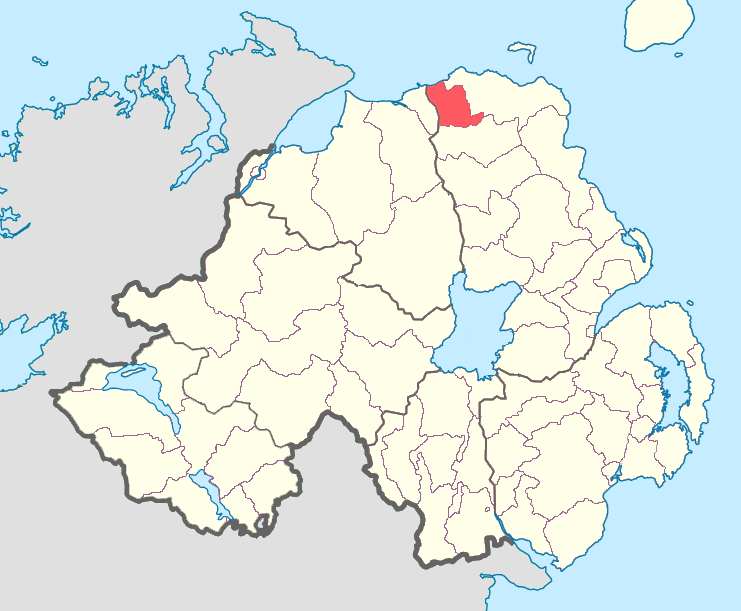
- Location of DunluceLower, County Antrim, Northern Ireland
- Sovereign state: United Kingdom
- Country: Northern Ireland
- County: Antrim

Dunluce Lower is a barony in County Antrim, Northern Ireland. To its north runs the north-Antrim coast, and it is bordered by three other baronies: Dunluce Upper to the south, Cary to the east, and the North East Liberties of Coleraine to the west. The River Bush flows through this barony. Dunluce Lower also formed the northern part of the medieval territory known as the Route.

== List of main settlements ==
Below is a list of settlements in Dunluce Lower:

=== Towns ===
- Portrush

=== Villages ===
- Bushmills
- Dervock
- Portballintrae

=== Population centres ===
- Priestland

== List of civil parishes ==
Below is a list of civil parishes in Dunluce Lower:

- Ballyrashane (also partly in barony of North-East Liberties of Coleraine)
- Ballywillan (split with barony of North-East Liberties of Coleraine)
- Billy (split with barony of Cary)
- Derrykeighan
- Dunluce
