= County Antrim =

Historic Northern Ireland county

County Antrim Contae Aontroma (Irish) Coontie Antrìm (Ulster-Scots)
- County
- Coat of arms
- Nickname: The Glens County
- Motto: Per angusta ad augusta (Latin) "Through Trial to Triumphs"
- Coordinates: 54.865°N 6.280°W
- Country: United Kingdom
- Constituent country: Northern Ireland
- Province: Ulster
- Established: c. 1400
- County town: Antrim
- Largest settlement: Belfast

Area
  - Total: 1,192 sq mi (3,086 km^{2})
- Highest elevation (Trostan): 1,808 ft (551 m)

Population (2021)
  - Total: 651,321
  - Rank: 2nd
- Time zone: UTC±0 (GMT)
  - Summer (DST): UTC+1 (BST)
- Postcode area: BT
- Contae Aontroma is the Irish name; Coontie Antrìm, Countie Antrim, Coontie Anthrim and Coonty Entrim are Ulster-Scots names.

County Antrim (Note: English: /ˈæn.trəm/ AN-trim, Irish: [ˈeːnˠt̪ˠɾˠɪmʲ]) (Irish: Aontroim) is one of the six counties of Northern Ireland, located within the historic province of Ulster. It is named after the town of Antrim, from Irish Aontroim, meaning 'lone ridge' Adjoined to the north-east shore of Lough Neagh, the county covers an area of 3,086 square kilometres (1,192 sq mi) and has a population of 651,321, as of the 2021 census. County Antrim has a population density of 211 people per square kilometre or 546 people per square mile. It is also one of the thirty-two traditional counties of Ireland.

The Glens of Antrim offer isolated rugged landscapes, the Giant's Causeway is a unique landscape and a UNESCO World Heritage Site, Bushmills produces whiskey, and Portrush is a popular seaside resort and nightlife area. The majority of Belfast, the capital city of Northern Ireland, is in County Antrim, with the remainder being in County Down.

According to the 2001, 2011, and 2021 censuses it is currently one of only two counties of the island of Ireland in which a plurality or majority of the population are from a Protestant background. The other is County Down to the south.

== Geography ==
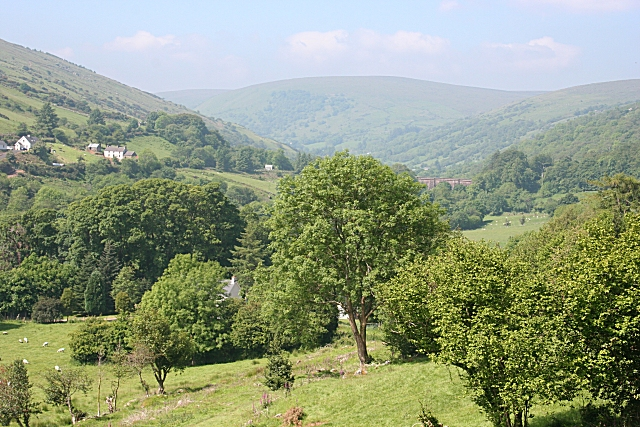
Glens of Antrim at Glendun

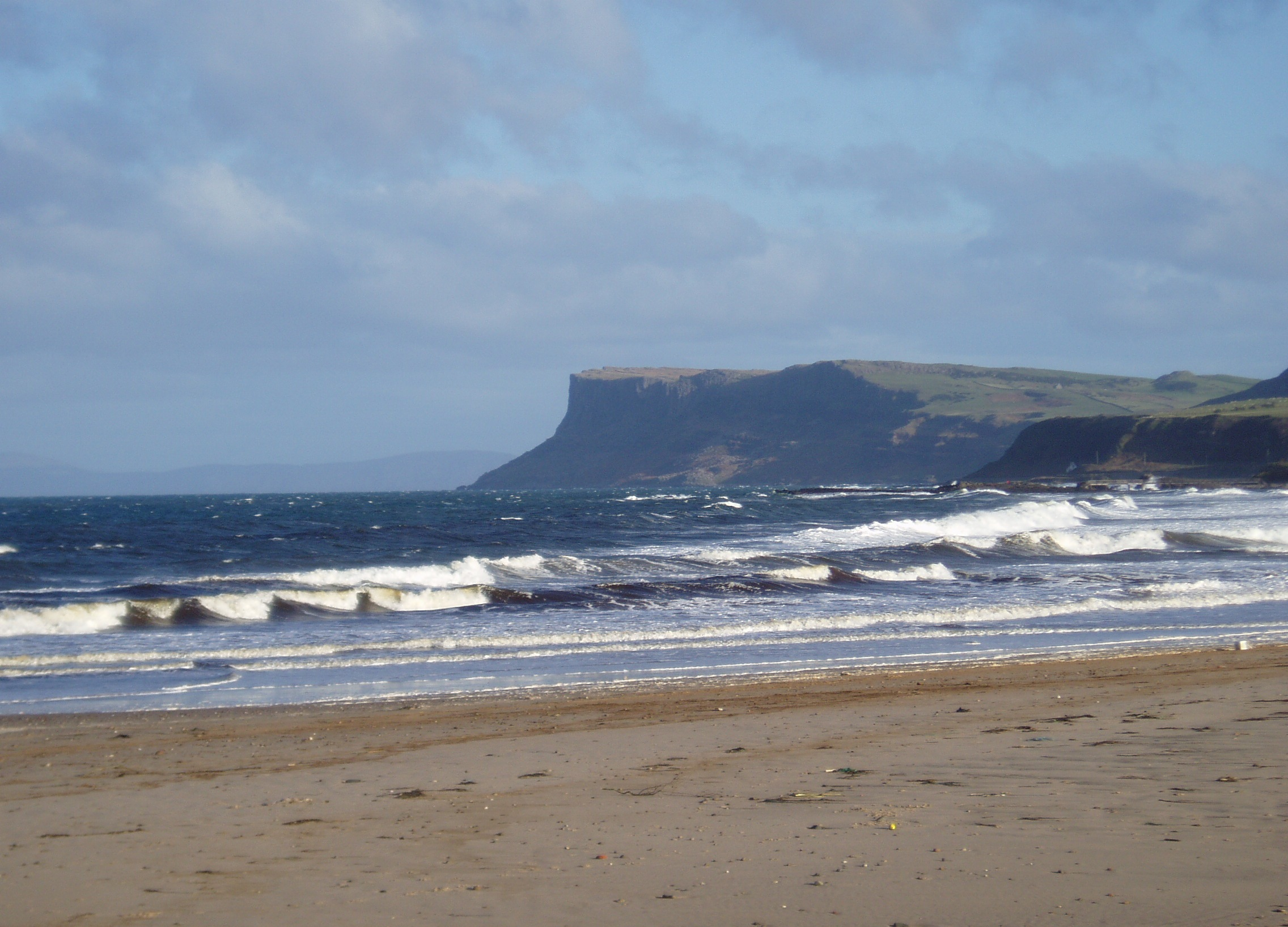
Fair Head seen from Ballycastle

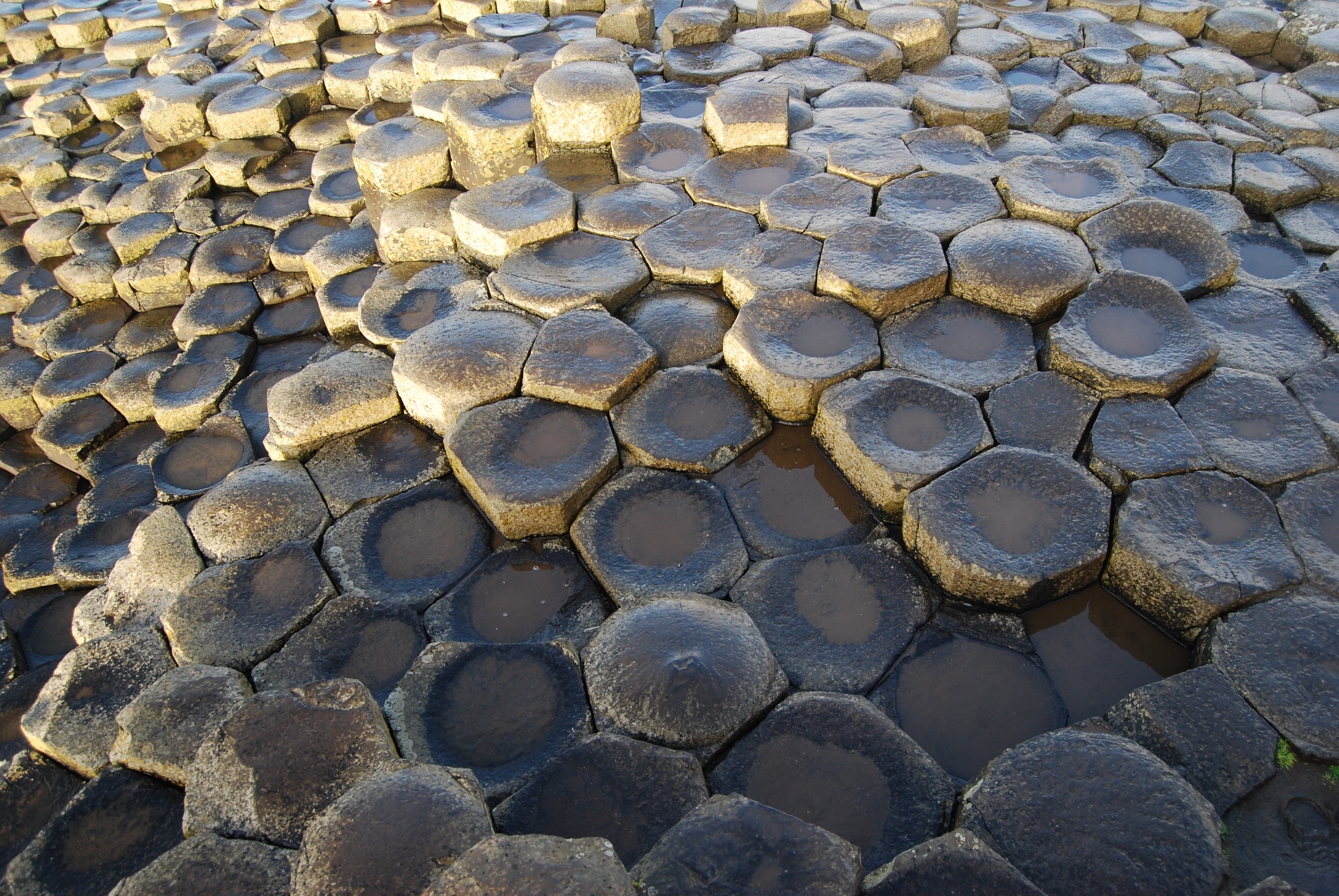
Columnar basalt at Giant's Causeway

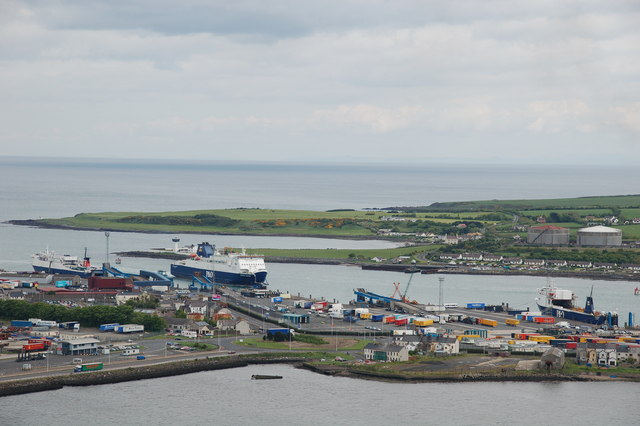
Larne Harbour

A large portion of Antrim is hilly, especially in the east, where the highest elevations are attained. The range runs north and south, and, following this direction, the highest points are Knocklayd 514 m (1,690 ft), Slieveanorra 508 m (1,670 ft), Trostan 550 m (1,800 ft), Slemish 437 m (1,430 ft), Agnew's Hill 474 m (1,560 ft) and Divis 478 m (1,570 ft). The inland slope is gradual, but on the northern shore the range terminates in abrupt and almost perpendicular declivities, and here, consequently, some of the finest coast scenery in the world is found, widely differing, with its unbroken lines of cliffs, from the indented coast-line of the west. The most remarkable cliffs are those formed of perpendicular basaltic columns, extending for many miles, and most strikingly displayed in Fair Head and the celebrated Giant's Causeway. From the eastern coast, the hills rise instantly but less abruptly, and the indentations are wider and deeper. On both coasts there are several resort towns, including Portrush (with well-known golf links), Portballintrae and Ballycastle; on the east Cushendun, Cushendall and Waterfoot on Red Bay, Carnlough and Glenarm, Larne on the Sea of Moyle, and Whitehead on Belfast Lough. All are somewhat exposed to the easterly winds prevalent in spring. The only island of size is the L-shaped Rathlin Island, off Ballycastle, 11 km (6.8 mi) in total length by 2 km (1.2 mi) maximum breadth, 7 km (4.3 mi) from the coast, and of similar basaltic and limestone formation to that of the mainland. It is partially arable and supports a small population. Islandmagee is a peninsula separating Larne Lough from the North Channel.

The valleys of the Bann and Lagan, with the intervening shores of Lough Neagh, form the fertile lowlands. These two rivers, both rising in County Down, are the only ones of importance. The latter flows to Belfast Lough, the former drains Lough Neagh, which is fed by a number of smaller streams. The fisheries of the Bann and Lough Neagh (especially for salmon and eels) are of value both commercially and to sportsmen, the small town of Toome, at the outflow of the river, being the centre. Immediately below this point lies Lough Beg, the "Small Lake", about 4.5 m (15 ft) lower than Lough Neagh.

=== Flora and fauna ===
Records of the seaweeds of County Antrim were brought together and published in 1907 by J. Adams who notes that the list contains 211 species. Batter's list, of 1902, contained 747 species in his catalogue of British marine algae.

Of the freshwater algae there are 10 taxa in the Charophyta (Charales) recorded from County Antrim: Chara aspera var. aspera; Chara globularis var. globularis; Chara globularis var. virgata (Kütz.) R.D.; Chara vulgaris var. vulgaris; Chara vulgaris var. contraria (A. Braun ex Kütz.) J.A.Moore; Chara vulgaris var. longibracteata (Kütz.) J. Groves & Bullock-Webster; Chara vulgaris var. papillata Wallr. ex A. Braun; Nitella flexilis var. flexilis; Nitella translucens (Pers.) C.A. Ag. and Tolypella nidifica var. glomerata (Desv.) R.D. Wood.

== Transport ==
County Antrim has a number of air, rail, and sea links.

=== Airports ===
Northern Ireland's main airport, Belfast International Airport, at Aldergrove, is in County Antrim. Belfast International shares its runways with 38 Brigade Flying Station Aldergrove, which otherwise has its own facilities. It is the fifth-largest regional air cargo centre in the UK. There are regular services to Great Britain, Europe, and North America.

The region is also served by George Best Belfast City Airport, a mile east of Belfast city centre on the County Down side of the city, which was renamed in 2006 in honour of footballer George Best.

=== Rail ===
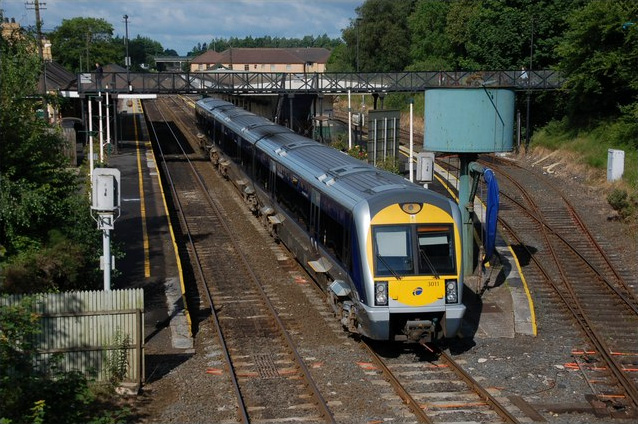
Lisburn railway station is on the major rail link between Belfast and Dublin

The main Translink Northern Ireland Railways routes are the major line between Belfast, Antrim, Ballymena, Coleraine and Derry, Belfast to Carrickfergus and Larne, the port for Stranraer in Scotland and Coleraine to Portrush.

=== Sea ===
Two of Northern Ireland's main ports are in County Antrim, Larne and Belfast.

Ferries sail from Larne Harbour to destinations including Cairnryan in Scotland.

The Port of Belfast is Northern Ireland's principal maritime gateway, serving the Northern Ireland economy and increasingly that of the Republic of Ireland. It is a major centre of industry and commerce and has become established as the focus of logistics activity for Northern Ireland. Around two-thirds of Northern Ireland's seaborne trade, and a quarter of that for Ireland as a whole, is handled at the port, which receives over 6,000 vessels each year.

== Demographics ==
As of the 2021 census, County Antrim had a population of 651,321, making it the most populous county in Northern Ireland, and the second-largest county by population on the island of Ireland, second only to County Dublin.

=== Ethnicity ===
Ethnic group (2021 Census)
Ethnic Group	Number	(%)
White: Total	623,574	95.74
White	622,011	95.50
White: British/Irish/Northern Irish/English/Scottish/Welsh (with or without non-UK or Irish national identities)	600,912	92.26
White: Other	21,099	3.24
White: Irish Traveller	569	0.09
White: Roma	994	0.15
Asian or Asian British: Total	16,533	2.54
Asian/Asian British: Indian	5,406	0.83
Asian/Asian British: Chinese	5,149	0.79
Asian/Asian British: Filipino	2,221	0.34
Asian/Asian British: Arab	1,114	0.17
Asian/Asian British: Pakistani	687	0.11
Asian/Asian British: Other Asian	1,956	0.30
Black or Black British: Total	4,614	0.71
Black/Black British: Black African	3,961	0.61
Black/Black British: Black Other	653	0.10
Mixed: Total	5,253	0.81
Other: Any other ethnic group: Total	1,347	0.21
Total	651,321	100.00

=== Country of birth ===
Country of birth (2021 Census)
Country of birth	Number	(%)
United Kingdom and Ireland	605,844	93.02
Northern Ireland	565,951	86.89
England	24,451	3.75
Scotland	6,010	0.92
Wales	936	0.14
Republic of Ireland	8,496	1.30
Europe	21,643	3.32
European Union	20,400	3.13
Other non-EU countries	1,243	0.19
Rest of World	23,833	3.66
Middle East and Asia	14,325	2.20
Africa	4,951	0.76
North America, Central America and Caribbean	2,885	0.44
Antarctica, Oceania and Other	1,061	0.16
South America	611	0.09
Total	651,321	100.00

=== Community background and religion ===
Religious Background in Antrim (2021)
Religion	Per cent
Protestant and Other Christian	47.0%
Catholic	40.1%
None	10.8%
Other faiths	2.1%

A traditionally Protestant-majority county since the Plantation of Ulster by Scottish and English settlers, the 2021 census revealed that those of a Protestant and Other Christian community background were no longer a majority in Antrim, comprising 47.0% of the population, a sharp decline from 75.2% in 1861. This is largely attributable to the rapid increase of the Catholic population, particularly in the city of Belfast, where they now comprise a plurality of the population, and its surrounding metropolitan area, as well as immigration from other parts of the world following the end of The Troubles and increasing rates of irreligion.

Religion or religion brought up in (2021 Census)
Religion or religion brought up in	Number	(%)
Protestant and Other Christian	306,335	47.03
Catholic	260,867	40.06
None (no religion)	70,629	10.84
Other religion	13,490	2.07
Total	651,321	100.00

Religion (2021 Census)
Religion	Number	(%)
Christian	498,196	76.49
Catholic	237,034	36.39
Presbyterian	127,230	19.53
Church of Ireland	66,990	10.29
Methodist	18,286	2.81
Other Christian (including Christian-related)	48,656	7.47
Protestant and Other Christian: Total	261,162	40.10
Other religions	12,049	1.85
None/not stated	141,076	21.66
No religion	129,016	19.81
Religion not stated	12,060	1.85
Total	651,321	100.00

=== National identity ===
National identity (2021 Census)
National identity	Number	%
British only	230,873	35.45%
Irish only	167,425	25.71%
Northern Irish only	121,867	18.71%
British and Northern Irish only	57,822	8.88%
Irish and Northern Irish only	10,341	1.59%
British, Irish, and Northern Irish only	9,673	1.49%
British and Irish only	4,142	0.64%
Other identity	49,178	7.55%
Total	651,321	100.00%
All Irish identities	193,538	29.72%
All British identities	308,548	47.37%
All Northern Irish identities	202,615	31.11%

=== Irish language and Ulster Scots ===
In the 2021 UK census in County Antrim:

- 12.77% claim to have some knowledge of the Irish language, whilst 3.64% claim to be able to speak, read, write, and understand spoken Irish. 2.55% claim to use Irish daily. 0.46% claim that Irish is their main language.
- 12.09% claim to have some knowledge of Ulster Scots, whilst 1.39% claim to be able to speak, read, write, and understand spoken Ulster Scots. 2.25% claim to use Ulster Scots daily.

Statistics for 2009–2010 show 1,832 students attending the twelve Gaelscoileanna (Irish language primary schools) and one Gaelcholáiste (Irish language secondary school).

== Administration ==
The county was administered by Antrim County Council from 1899 until the abolition of county councils in Northern Ireland in 1973. The traditional county town is Antrim. More recently, Ballymena was the seat of county government. From 1973, Northern Ireland was split into districts, which were redrawn in 2015. County Antrim is part of the following districts:

- Antrim and Newtownabbey
- Belfast
- Causeway Coast and Glens
- Mid and East Antrim
- Lisburn and Castlereagh
- Armagh City, Banbridge and Craigavon

The county contains within it the whole of five parliamentary constituencies:

- Belfast North
- Belfast West
- East Antrim
- North Antrim
- South Antrim

Parts of the following five parliamentary constituencies are also in County Antrim:

- Belfast East
- Belfast South
- East Londonderry
- Lagan Valley
- Upper Bann

== Settlements ==
=== Cities ===
Places with official city status:

- Belfast
- Lisburn

=== Large towns ===
(population of 18,000 or more and under 75,000 at the 2001 Census)

- Antrim
- Ballymena
- Carrickfergus
- Larne
- Newtownabbey

=== Medium towns ===
(population of 10,000 or more and under 18,000 at the 2001 Census)

- Ballymoney

=== Small towns ===
Ballycastle

(Population of 4,500 or more and under 10,000 at the 2001 Census)

- Ballycastle
- Ballyclare
- Crumlin
- Greenisland
- Jordanstown
- Portrush
- Randalstown

=== Intermediate settlements ===
(population of 2,250 or more and under 4,500 at the 2001 Census)

- Ahoghill
- Broughshane
- Cullybackey
- Glenavy
- Whitehead

=== Villages ===
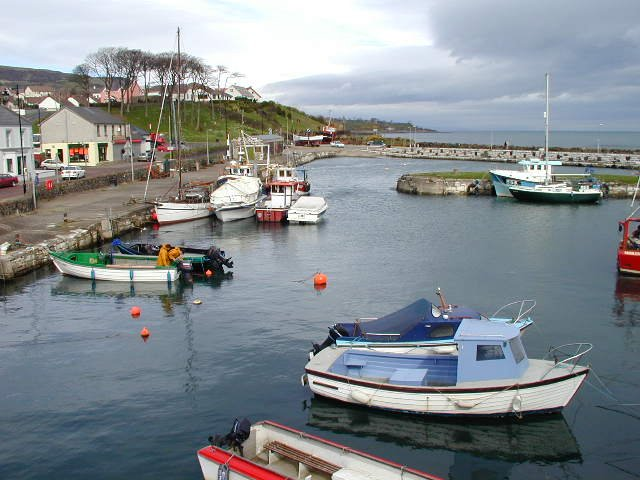
Carnlough

(Population of 1,000 or more and under 2,250 at the 2001 Census)

- Ballycarry
- Bushmills
- Carnlough
- Cloughmills
- Cogry & Kilbride
- Cushendall
- Doagh
- Dunloy
- Kells
- Portglenone
- Templepatrick

=== Small villages or hamlets ===
(population of less than 1,000 at the 2001 Census)

- Aghagallon
- Aghalee
- Aldergrove
- Armoy
- Ballintoy
- Ballycarry
- Ballyeaston
- Ballygalley
- Ballynure
- Boneybefore
- Cairncastle
- Carnalbanagh
- Cargan
- Cushendun
- Dervock
- Glenarm
- Glynn
- Loughguile
- Moss-Side
- Newtown Crommelin
- Parkgate
- Portballintrae
- Rasharkin
- Stranocum
- Toome

== Subdivisions ==
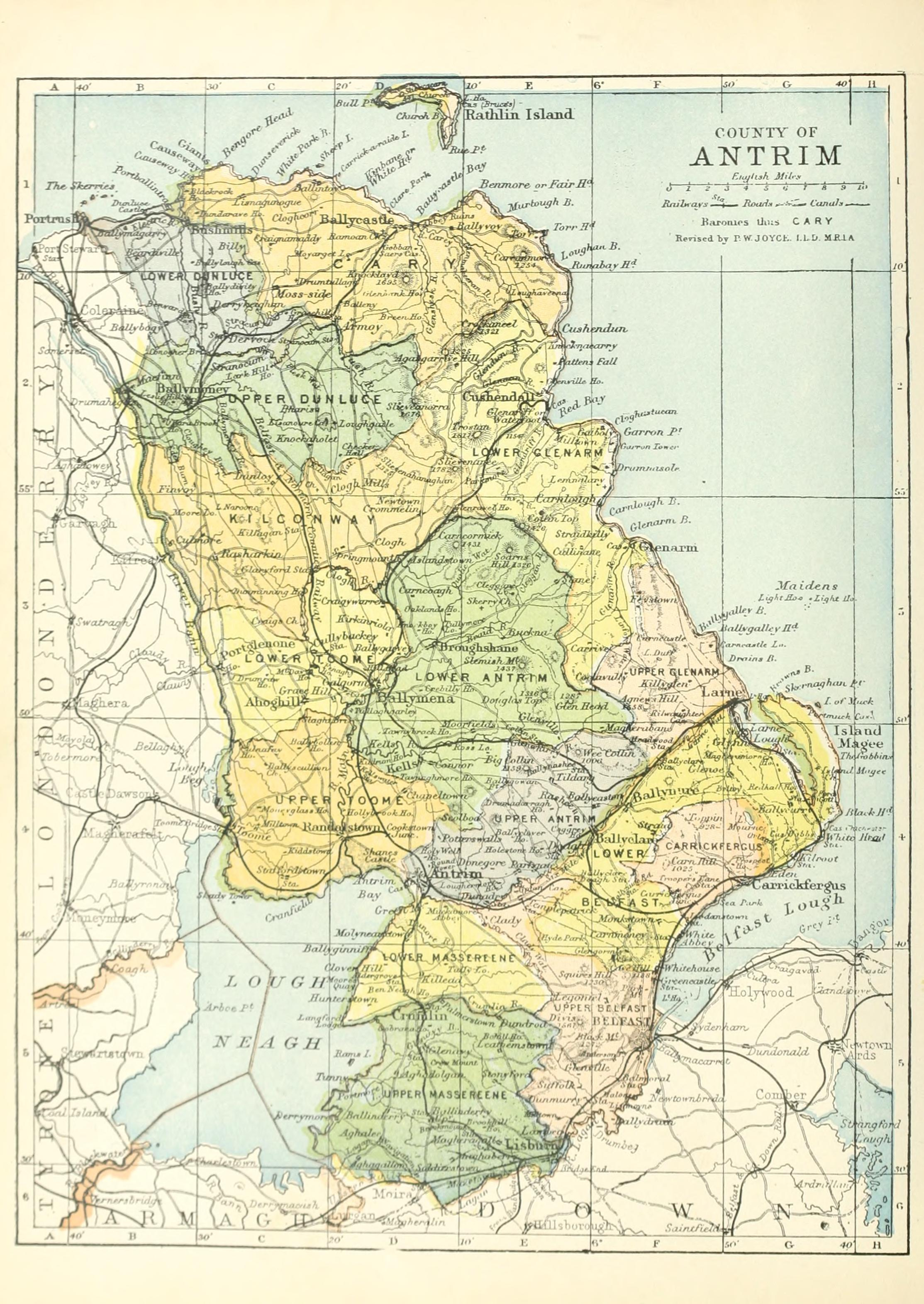
Baronies of County Antrim

Civil parish map of County Antrim

Baronies

- Antrim Lower
- Antrim Upper
- Belfast Lower
- Belfast Upper
- Carrickfergus
- Cary
- Dunluce Lower
- Dunluce Upper
- Glenarm Lower
- Glenarm Upper
- Kilconway
- Massereene Lower
- Massereene Upper
- Toome Lower
- Toome Upper

Parishes

Townlands

== History ==
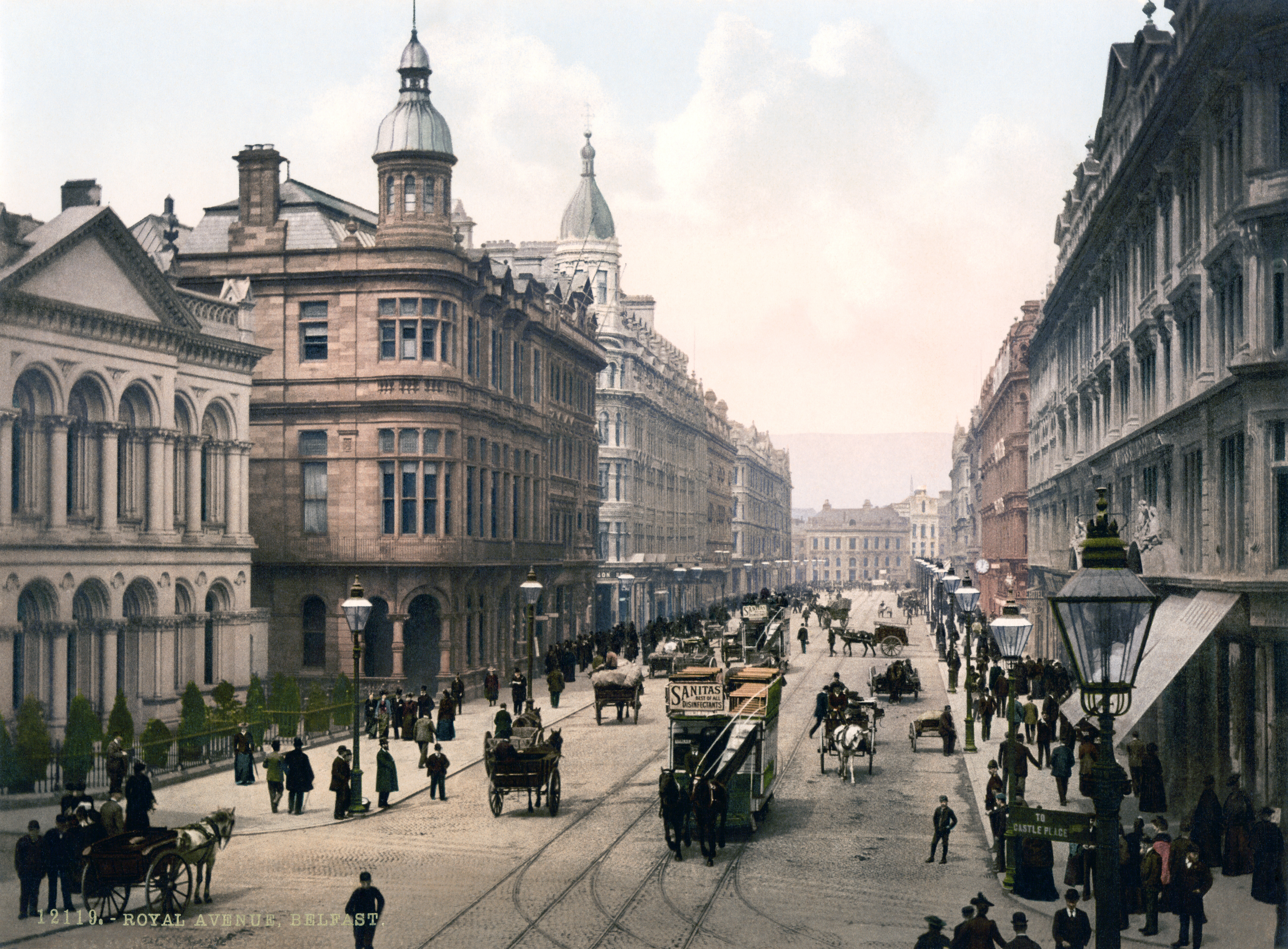
Royal Avenue, Belfast. Photochrom print c. 1890–1900.

At what date the county of Antrim was formed is not known, but it appears that a certain district bore this name before the reign of Edward II (early 14th century), and when the shiring of Ulster was undertaken by Sir John Perrot in the 16th century, Antrim and Down were already recognised divisions, in contradistinction to the remainder of the province. The earliest known inhabitants were Mesolithic hunter-gatherers of pre-Celtic origin. At the Mount Sandel Mesolithic site (in Coleraine along the east side of the river Bann) known human habitation there dates to around 7000 BC making it one of the earliest sites in Ireland. The names of the townlands or subdivisions, supposed to have been made in the 13th century, are all of Celtic derivation.

In ancient times, Antrim was inhabited by a Celtic people called the Darini. In the early Middle Ages, southern County Antrim was part of the Kingdom of Ulidia, ruled by the Dál Fiatach clans Keenan and MacDonlevy/McDunlavey; the north was part of Dál Riada, which stretched into what is now western Scotland over the Irish Sea. Dál Riada was ruled by the O'Lynch clan, who were vassals of the Ulidians. Besides the Ulidians and Dál Riada, there were the Dál nAraide of lower County Antrim, and the Cruthin, who were pre-Gaelic Celts and probably related to the Picts of Britain. Between the 8th and 11th centuries Antrim was exposed to the inroads of the Vikings.

In the late 12th century, Antrim became part of the Earldom of Ulster, conquered by Anglo-Norman invaders. A revival of Gaelic power followed the campaign of Edward Bruce in 1315, leaving Carrickfergus as the only significant English stronghold. In the late Middle Ages, Antrim was divided into three parts: northern Clandeboye, the Glynnes, and the Route. The Cambro-Norman MacQuillans were powerful in the Route.

A branch of the O'Neills of Tirconnell (modern Tyrone) migrated to Clandeboye in the 14th century and ruled it for a time from their castle on Lough Neagh. Their family was called Clandeboye O'Neills. Donald Balloch, who succeeded his father John Mor Macdonald, Lord of Dunyvaig and the Glens, married the daughter of Conn O'Neill of the Clandeboye O'Neills sometime after the Battle of Inverlochy. In 1433, Alexander of Islay, Lord of the Isles, joined with his cousin, Donald Balloch, Conn O'Neill of the Clandeboye O'Neills, and Eoghan O'Neill, king of Tirowen (modern Tyrone), to defend against an attack on Antrim by the O'Donnells of Tirconnell. Alexander Macdonald led the attack that was successful, so that the O'Donnells became subject to the O'Neills of Tirowen. A Gallowglass sept, the MacDonnells (they were "Macdonalds" in Scotland), became the most powerful in the Glens in the 15th century.

During the Tudor era (16th century), numerous adventurers from Britain attempted to colonise the region; many Scots settled in Antrim around this time. In 1588, the Antrim coast was the scene of one of the 24 wrecks of the Spanish Armada in Ireland. The Spanish vessel La Girona was wrecked off Lacana Point, Giant's Causeway in 1588 with the loss of nearly 1,300 lives.

Antrim is divided into sixteen baronies. Lower Antrim, part of Lower Clandeboye, was settled by the sept O'Flynn/O'Lynn. Upper Antrim, part of Lower Clandeboye, was the home of the O'Keevans. Belfast was part of Lower Clandeboye and was held by the O'Neill-Clannaboys. Lower Belfast, Upper Belfast, and Carrickfergus were also part of Lower Clandeboye. Cary was part of the Glynnes; ruled originally by the O'Quinn sept, the MacDonnell galloglasses from Scotland took power here in the late Middle Ages, and some of the O'Haras also migrated from Connaught. Upper and Lower Dunluce were part of the Route and were ruled by the MacQuillans. Upper and Lower Glenarm was ruled by the O'Flynn/O'Lynn sept, considered part of the Glynns. In addition to that sept and that of O'Quinn, both of which were native, the Scottish Gallowglass septs of MacKeown, MacAlister, and MacGee are found there. Kilconway was originally O'Flynn/O'Lynn territory, but was held by the MacQuillans as part of the Route, and later by the gallowglass sept of MacNeill. Lower Massereene was part of Lower Clandeboye and was ruled by the O'Flynns and the O'Heircs. Upper Massereene was part of Lower Clandeboye, ruled by the O'Heircs. Upper and Lower Toome, part of the Route, were O'Flynn/O'Lynn territory. Misc was first ruled by the MacQuillans. Later, the Scottish Gallowglass MacDonnells and MacAlisters invaded. The MacDonnells were a branch of the Scottish Clan MacDonald; the MacAlisters traced their origin back to the Irish Colla Uais, eldest of the Three Collas.

Islandmagee had, besides antiquarian remains, a notoriety as a home of witchcraft, and during the Irish Rebellion of 1641 was the scene of an act of reprisal (for the massacre of Protestants) against the Catholic population by the Scottish Covenanter soldiery of Carrickfergus.

In 1689, during the Williamite War in Ireland, County Antrim was a centre of Protestant resistance against the rule of the Catholic James II. During the developing crisis, James' garrison at Carrickfergus successfully repulsed an attempt by local Protestants to storm it. After the advance of the Irish Army under Richard Hamilton, all of County Antrim was brought under Jacobite control. Later in the year, a major expedition from England under Marshal Schomberg landed in Belfast Lough and successfully laid siege to Carrickfergus. Having captured most of the largest towns of the area, they then marched southwards towards Dundalk.

=== Historic monuments ===
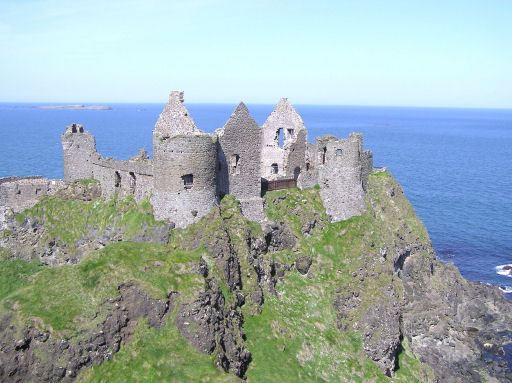
Dunluce Castle.

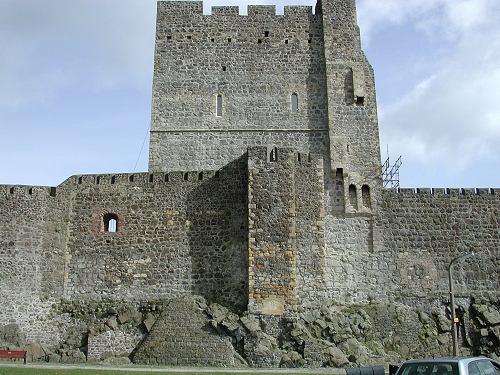
Carrickfergus Castle (1177)

The antiquities of the county consist of cairns, mounts or forts, remains of ecclesiastical and military structures, and round towers.

There are three round towers: one at Antrim, one at Armoy, and one on Ram's Island in Lough Neagh, only that at Antrim being perfect. There are some remains of the ecclesiastic establishments at Bonamargy, where the earls of Antrim are buried, Kells, Glenarm, Glynn, Muckamore and Whiteabbey.

The castle at Carrickfergus, dating from the Norman invasion of Ireland, is one of the best preserved medieval structures in Ireland. There are, however, remains of other ancient castles, as Olderfleet, Cam's, Shane's, Glenarm, Garron Tower, Red Bay, and Dunluce Castle, notable for its dramatic location on a rocky outcrop.

The principal cairns are: one on Colin mountain, near Lisburn; one on Slieve True, near Carrickfergus; and two on Colinward. The cromlechs most worthy of notice are: one near Cairngrainey, to the north-east of the old road from Belfast to Templepatrick; the large cromlech at Mount Druid, near Ballintoy; and one at the northern extremity of Islandmagee. The mounts, forts, and entrenchments are very numerous.

The natural rock formations of Giant's Causeway on the Antrim coast are now designated a UNESCO World Heritage Site.

=== Saint Patrick ===
Slemish, about eight miles (13 km) east of Ballymena, is notable as being the scene of St Patrick's early life. According to tradition, Saint Patrick was a slave for seven years, near the hill of Slemish, until he escaped back to Great Britain.

=== Linen ===
Linen manufacturing was previously an important industry in the county. At the time, Ireland produced a large amount of flax. Cotton-spinning by jennies was first introduced to Belfast by industrialists Robert Joy and Thomas M'Cabe in 1777; and twenty-three years later, it was estimated that more than 27,000 people were employed in the industry within ten miles (16 km) of Belfast. Women were employed in the working of patterns on muslin.

== Notable residents ==
- James Adair (1709–1783), explorer, trader, and historian
- John Bodkin Adams (1899–1983), general practitioner born in Randalstown and suspected of killing 163 patients while practising in England
- William Aiken (1779–1831), founder of South Carolina Canal and Rail Road Company
- Wayne Boyd (born 1990), racing driver
- Hugh Boyle (1897–1986), from Dunloy, Catholic Bishop of Port Elizabeth and of Johannesburg
- Joey Dunlop (1952–2000), from Ballymoney, five-time World Motorcycle Champion
- Caroline Girvan (born 1984), fitness trainer and YouTuber
- Conleth Hill (born 1964), from Ballycastle, actor
- William Magee Hunter (1834–1868), New Zealand soldier, born in County Antrim
- Samuel Kelly (1818–1877), coal merchant and businessman
- Sir John Jamison (1776–1844), physician and naval surgeon from Carrickfergus who became a constitutional reformer in New South Wales, Australia
- George Macartney, 1st Earl Macartney (1737–1806), from Ballymoney, first British Ambassador to China
- Tony McCoy (born 1974), from Moneyglass, jockey
- Eva McGown (1883–1972), chorister, pioneer, and hostess in Alaska
- John O'Kane Murray (1847–1885), physician and author
- Liam Neeson (born 1952), from Ballymena, actor
- James Nesbitt (born 1965), from Ballymena, actor
- Josh Rock (born 2001), darts player
- General Sir James Steele (1894–1975), senior British Army officer who served in both World War I and World War II

== See also ==
- Abbeys and priories in Northern Ireland (County Antrim)
- List of archaeological sites in County Antrim
- List of townlands in County Antrim
- List of civil parishes of County Antrim
- Lord Lieutenant of Antrim
- High Sheriff of Antrim
