= Barony (Ireland) =

Historical subdivision of a county of Ireland

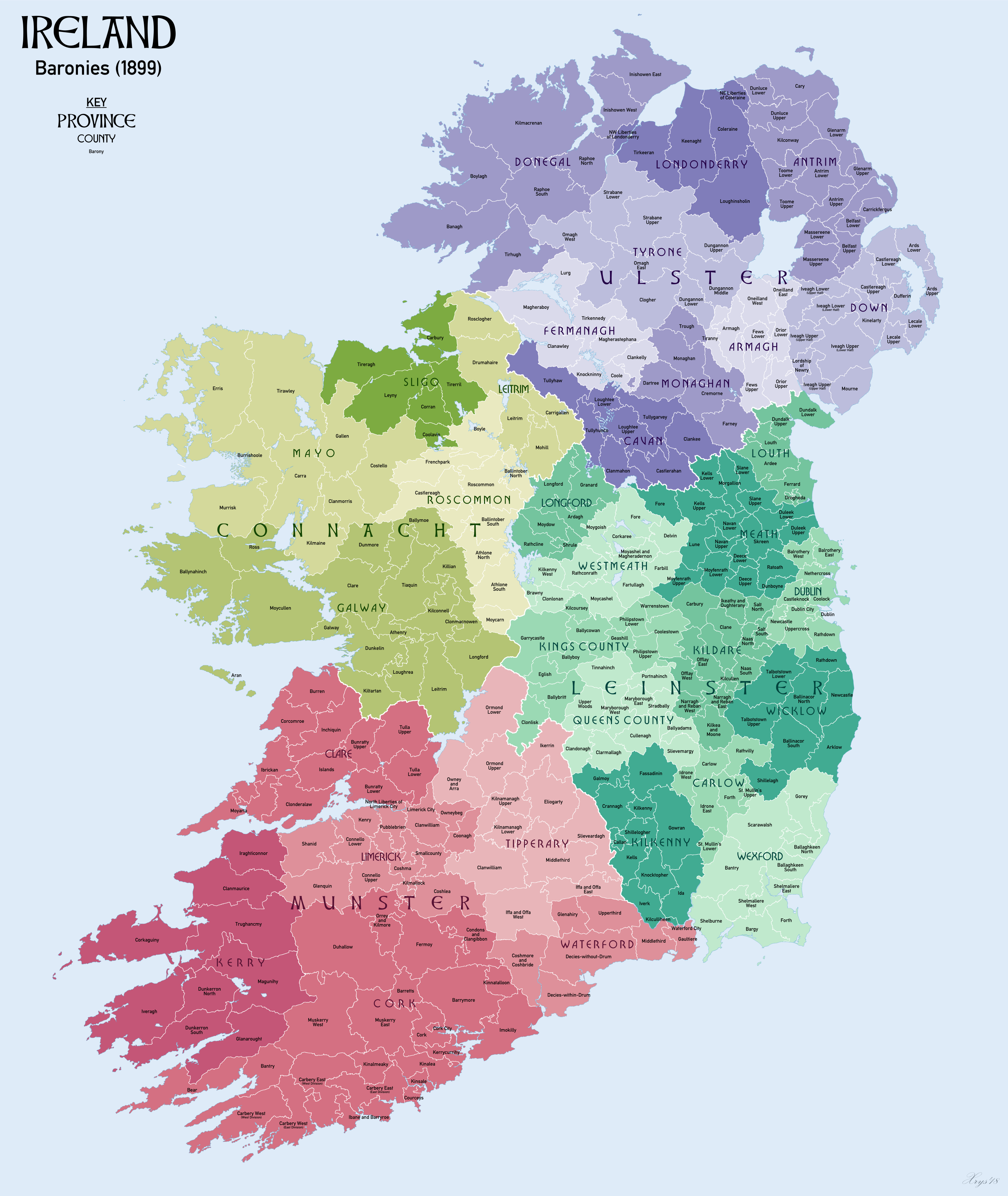
Map of the Baronies of Ireland in 1899

In Ireland, a barony (Irish: barúntacht, plural barúntachtaí) is a historical subdivision of a county, analogous to the hundreds into which the counties of England were divided. Baronies were created during the Tudor reconquest of Ireland, replacing the earlier cantreds formed after the original Norman invasion. Some early baronies were later subdivided into half baronies with the same standing as full baronies.

Baronies were mainly cadastral rather than administrative units. They acquired modest local taxation and spending functions in the 19th century before being superseded by the Local Government (Ireland) Act 1898. Subsequent adjustments of county boundaries mean that some baronies now straddle two counties.

The final catalogue of baronies numbered 331, with an average area of 255 km^{2} (98 sq mi; 63,000 acres); each county was divided, on average, into 10 or 11 baronies.

== Creation ==
The island of Ireland was "shired" into counties in two distinct periods: the east and south during the Anglo-Norman period (from the 1169 invasion to the early fourteenth century) and the rest in the Tudor conquest of the sixteenth century. "Barony" was used in three overlapping but distinct senses in the early period:

- a "feudal barony" was an honour or large manor
- a "parliamentary barony" was a rank of the peerage of Ireland, giving the right to sit in the Parliament of Ireland
- an "administrative barony" or cantred was a unit for taxation purposes

Over the centuries, these senses diverged, and many administrative baronies were not associated with feudal or noble titles. Spurious "barony" titles have been sold by using the names of administrative baronies for which there is no corresponding hereditary or prescriptive barony. In counties Louth and Meath, the administrative subdivisions were called "baronies" from the beginning, originally as portions given by Hugh de Lacy, Lord of Meath to his vassals. Further south the name "cantred" was used till the fifteenth century. The cantreds declined with the rest of the English colony as its influence retreated to the Pale in the fourteenth century, and when the Tudors and Stuarts revived and extended county government, the baronies which they delimited often bore little relation to the earlier cantreds.

Most cantreds corresponded to the túath ('country') or trícha cét ('thirty hundred [men]') of a Gaelic chief. However, sometimes baronies combined small territories, or split a large one, or were created without regard for the earlier boundaries. In the Norman period most Gaelic chiefs were killed, expelled, or subordinated by the new Norman lord; in the Tudor period, many Gaelic and Hibernicized lords retained their land by pledging allegiance to the Crown under surrender and regrant.

Sir John Perrot's commissioners reported 184 "cantreds, otherwise called hundreds or baronies" in 1589; William Petty reported 252 baronies in 1672.

Baronies were sometimes subdivided, and occasionally combined. The parts of a subdivided barony were called half-baronies, but had the same legal standing. Some subdivisions came about when new counties were formed, and the new boundary split a pre-existing barony. In three cases, there are adjacent half-baronies in neighbouring counties with the same name: Rathdown (Dublin—Wicklow), Fore (Meath—Westmeath), and Ballymoe (Galway—Roscommon). Subdivision happened especially in the 19th century, when qualifiers "Upper"/"Lower"(/"Middle"), "North"/"South", or "East/"West" were used for the half-baronies. The main basis for this subdivision was the Grand Jury (Ireland) Act, 1836, which empowered a county's grand jury to divide baronies of at least 45,000 acres (180 km^{2}) and unite baronies totalling at most 40,000 acres (160 km^{2}). An 1837 act relaxed these restrictions for County Fermanagh, where many baronies were split by Lough Erne. The baronies of Iveagh, Muskerry, and Connello were each subdivided twice: Upper and Lower Iveagh each have Upper and Lower Halves; East and West Muskerry each have East and West Divisions; the western divisions split from Upper and Lower Connello were named Shanid and Glenquin respectively. When County Tipperary was split into North and South Ridings in 1838, the barony of Kilnamanagh was split into Upper and Lower half-baronies.

At the Reformation the parishes for civil purposes were the ecclesiastical parishes of the established Church of Ireland. Originally each parish was usually within a single barony, but less so over time. A townland might be an exclave of a parish, and potentially of its barony; under the Valuation of Lands (Ireland) Act 1836, detached parts of baronies were annexed to an adjacent barony, but not so for parishes. The rationalisation of small ecclesiastical parishes into larger benefices sometimes entailed merging the corresponding civil parishes, which might thus cross barony (and county) boundaries.

=== Peculiar districts ===
Many towns had a specific royal charter granting them borough status similar to English law. These were originally independent of the baronies, which were rural divisions of the "county at large". By the time of Beaufort's 1792 Memoir of Ireland, this was true of fewer towns. Beaufort distinguishes between baronies and "peculiar districts"; the latter encompassing counties corporate and liberties in the environs of some of the older or larger towns and cities.

==== Liberties ====
The liberties listed by Beaufort separately from baronies are those of Kinsale, Mallow and Youghal in County Cork; Callan in County Kilkenny; Kilmallock in County Limerick; Derry and Coleraine in County Londonderry; and Wexford in County Wexford. Of these, those of Wexford, Mallow, and Youghal are no longer counted as separate from the adjacent baronies. Those of Kinsale, Callen, and Kilmallock are now counted as baronies. A 1791 act dealt with the two in County Londonderry; it made the North West Liberties of Londonderry, together with the city, into a barony, while the liberties on the east bank of the River Foyle were attached to the half barony of Tirkeeran. Similarly, the North East Liberties of Coleraine formed a barony together with the town, while the liberties on the west bank of the River Bann were attached to the separate half-barony of Coleraine. The lands of the Lordship of Newry, originating with the Cistercians of Newry Abbey and passing to the Earl of Kilmorey, were similarly regularised into a barony of County Down and a civil parish of County Armagh.

==== Counties corporate ====
There were eight counties corporate: the "County of the City" of each of Cork, Dublin, Limerick, Kilkenny, and Waterford, and the "County of the Town" of each of Carrickfergus, Drogheda and Galway. These were excluded from the enclosing "county-at-large" and exercised at a single level the functions which elsewhere were split between county and barony level. Thus, they had "baronial presentment sessions" although they were not strictly speaking baronies. Each such city or town also had a municipal corporation which had parallel authority with the grand jury; however, each county corporate except Carrickfergus included rural "liberties" outside the municipal boundary. The Municipal Corporations (Ireland) Act 1840 abolished the corporations of Carrickfergus and Galway, while the Counties and Boroughs (Ireland) Act 1840, passed simultaneously, transferred the liberties of the other six counties corporate to the adjoining county-at-large. The transferred area was sometimes assigned to one or more existing county baronies, but sometimes made a barony in its own right. The reduced-size counties corporate continued till the Local Government (Ireland) Act 1898, at which point each of those of Kilkenny and the three towns was merged with a neighbouring county to form a new administrative county, while the other four counties of cities each became a county borough. Both before and after 1898, where a statute presupposed that a county was divided into baronies, judges sometimes construed it by assuming that each county corporate constituted a single barony.

== Historical functions ==
The various Plantations of Ireland were organised largely by barony. Different categories of English and Scottish settlers were planted in particular baronies in the midlands and Munster. Likewise the "precincts" into which the plantation of Ulster was organised were mostly coterminous with baronies, though some were split or combined. In certain counties after the Cromwellian reconquest, Adventurers got lands in half the baronies, with soldiers in the other half. The Irish who had forfeited their lands in those regions were resettled in Connacht and Clare, with each county of origin assigned to particular destination baronies. William Petty's Down Survey of 1655–6 collected statistics and produced maps at barony level to assist the reorganisation.

Acts of 1787 and 1792 allowed the Lord Lieutenant of Ireland to appoint a constable for each barony, and the county grand jury to appoint up to 16 sub-constables. These powers were seldom used and the constables had few powers; they were usually older men nicknamed "old Barnys", with the archetypal "old Barny McKeown". They were superseded by the Royal Irish Constabulary.

The cess to pay for roads, bridges, and other public works was set per barony. "Presentment sessions", where petitioners applied for funding for such works, were originally held as part of the county assizes, though the costs were paid from the barony cess if the work was of local benefit only. The county grand jury was supposed to have included jurors from each barony, though this did not always happen. From 1819, significantly modified in 1836, baronial presentment sessions were held for these purposes, with a local jury picked by the county grand jury from among the barony's highest rate-payers, according to a complicated formula. The baronial presentment sessions were a convoluted process, lacking public confidence and marred by allegations of corruption and favouritism. Special emergency sessions were held during the Famine of the 1840s for the make-work schemes.

Several parallel local administrative divisions were formed in the nineteenth century, which were not based on the barony. The Poor Law Unions were established in 1838, each centred on an eponymous town; most new or altered responsibilities were given to them in subsequent decades. These Unions which were divided into district electoral divisions (DEDs) for funding purposes. Petty sessions courts for civil cases and quarter sessions for criminal cases used still another set of land divisions.

For each two-seat county constituency in the Irish House of Commons, the election was held in the county town, with a separate polling booth for electors resident in each barony or half-baroiny. The single-seat divisions into which the Redistribution of Seats Act 1885 split most Irish county constituencies were defined largely or exclusively in terms of the baronies which they comprised; however, in some cases a barony was split parish by parish between two divisions. The 1891 census was the last for which returns were aggregated by barony as well as by Union and DED; the 1901 census used only the latter classification, though it and the 1911 census included the barony in the detailed returns.

The 1898 Act replaced the county assizes with an elected county council; at a lower level, the county was divided into urban and rural districts, each with an elected council. These councils had power to levy rates and build public works, and the baronial presentment sessions were abolished.

== Modern existence ==
While baronies continue to be officially defined units, they are no longer used for many administrative purposes. Their official status is illustrated by Placenames Orders made since 2003, where official Irish names of baronies are listed under "Administrative units".

Baronies continue to be used in land registration, and specification such as in planning permissions. For example, the form for registration of a freehold property includes a schedule "To contain description of the property, giving area, townland, barony and county, or, if in a city or urban district, the street or road and city or urban district".

Barony boundaries have remained essentially unchanged since 1898. An exception occurs when land is reclaimed from the sea, whereupon the maritime boundary of the coastal land units will be extended accordingly. For example, a 1994 statutory instrument extended the boundary of the Barony of Arklow, along with the boundaries of the county (Wicklow), the district electoral division (Arklow Rural), the civil parish (Arklow), and the townlands (Rock Big, Rock Little, and Money Big).

The Local Government (Ireland) Act also caused a number of county boundaries to be modified, with the result that a number of baronies now cross county boundaries. This can cause confusion to genealogy researchers, who may be unable to find an area referred to as being in a particular county in 19th century sources in the modern county. Most markedly, the entire territory of the small barony of Kilculliheen was moved from County Waterford to County Kilkenny. Likewise in 1976, when suburbs of Drogheda were transferred from County Meath to County Louth, barony boundaries were not adjusted.

The marginal relevance of baronies means many people have no idea which barony they live in. However, some remain a focus for local patriotism. Some public houses and older provincial hotels bear the name of the barony in which they are located; likewise some clubs of the Gaelic Athletic Association, for example Carbury (County Kildare), Castlerahan, and Kilmurry Ibrickane. Four of the six regional divisions of Cork GAA are named after baronies corresponding to major parts of their respective areas: Carbery, Duhallow, Imokilly, and Muskerry.

== List of baronies ==
The final catalogue of baronies numbered 331. A figure of 273 is also quoted, by combining those divided into half-baronies, as by east–west, north–south, or upper/middle/lower divisions. Every point in Ireland is in precisely one of the listed divisions. However, the municipal area of the four cities with barony status in 1898 has extended since then into the surrounding baronies. Prior to 1898, the baronies around Dublin City were shrunk according as they ceded land to the expanding city; but there is now land which is both within the current city boundaries and within one of the pre-1898 county baronies. Notably, the Barony of Dublin, created in 1842, is almost entirely within the city, although still separate from the Barony of Dublin City.

== See also ==
- Barony (country subdivision)
- List of Irish local government areas 1898–1921
- Civil parishes in Ireland
- Townland

== Bibliography ==
- Beaufort, Daniel Augustus (1792). Memoir of a map of Ireland. London: W. Faden, J. Debrett, and James Edwards.
- Clarkson, L.A.; L. Kennedy; E.M. Crawford; M.W. Dowling (12 November 1997). "Notes on Baronies of Ireland 1821–1891" (PDF). Database of Irish Historical Statistics : Religion, 1861–1911. UK Data Archive.
- Hancock, W. Neilson (1876). "Local Government and Taxation in Ireland". In J. W. Probyn (ed.). Local government and taxation. Cobden Club Essays. Cassel, Fetter & Galpin. pp. 173–231.
- MacCotter, Paul (2005). "Functions of the cantred in medieval Ireland". Peritia. 19. Brepols: 308–332. doi:10.1484/J.Peri.3.581. ISSN 0332-1592.
- Nicholls, Kenneth (Autumn 1996). "Media Taken in by Bogus Baronies". History Ireland. 4 (3). Wordwell Ltd: 7–8. JSTOR 27724359.
- Petty, William (1851). Thomas Aiskew Larcom (ed.). History of the Cromwellian survey of Ireland, A.D. 1655-6: commonly called "The down survey". Dublin: Irish Archaeological and Celtic Society.
- Prendergast, John Patrick (1868). The Cromwellian settlement of Ireland. New York City: P. M. Haverty.
- Price, Liam (1954). "Ráith Oinn". Éigse: A Journal of Irish Studies. 7: 182–190.
- The Parliamentary Gazetteer of Ireland adapted to the new Poor-Law, Franchise, Municipal and Ecclesiastical arrangements ... as existing in 1844–45. Dublin: A. Fullarton & Co. 1846. Vol. I: A–C, Vol. II: D–M, Vol. III: N–Z
