= List of localities in Northern Ireland by population =

Settlements in Northern Ireland
- A map of settlements in Northern Ireland, highlighted in red

This is a list of settlements in Northern Ireland by population, based on data published by the Northern Ireland Statistics and Research Agency (NISRA), from the 2021 Census.

== Settlement classification ==
NISRA's classification of settlements is as follows. Note that 'Large town' and 'medium town' includes Bangor, Lisburn, Newry and Armagh, which all have city status.

Classification		Population threshold	No.	Total pop.	%	Mean pop.
Band A - Belfast		Contains Belfast City only	1	291,386	15.31	291,386
Band B - Derry City		Contains Derry City only	1	84,884	4.46	84,884
Band C - Large town		>18,000	14	552,950	29.05	39,496
Band D - Medium town		10,000-17,999	12	145,896	7.67	12,158
Band E - Small town		5,000-9,999	16	112,647	5.92	7,040
"Default urban-rural split" according to NISRA						
Band F - Intermediate settlement		2,500-4,999	26	84,742	4.45	3,259
Band G - Village		1,000-2,499	75	112,090	5.89	1,495
Band H - Small village, hamlet or open countryside	Band H total	<1,000		518,580	27.25	
Band H - Small village, hamlet or open countryside	Small village or hamlet	Small village or hamlet total	495	119,565-124,515	6.28-6.54	242-252
Band H - Small village, hamlet or open countryside	Small village or hamlet	51-999	402	119,565	6.28	297
Band H - Small village, hamlet or open countryside	Small village or hamlet	<51	93	4,950 or less	<0.26	N/A
Band H - Small village, hamlet or open countryside	Open countryside (the rest of Northern Ireland)			394,065-399,015	20.71-20.97	N/A
All settlements			640	1,509,110-1,514,060	79.29-79.55	2,358-2,366
Total				1,903,175	100	

== Map of settlements ==

Settlements highlighted in red
Settlement

=== Settlements by county ===

Settlements colour-coded by county
Antrim	Armagh	Down
Fermanagh	Londonderry	Tyrone

== List ==
Settlements with city status are shown in bold. Districts are local government districts as established in April 2015.

#	Settlement	District	County	Population	Households	Land area (km^{2})	Density (/km^{2})	Classification
	Belfast Metropolitan Urban Area (Note: Contains Belfast, Lisburn, Newtownabbey, Bangor, Castlereagh, Carrickfergus, Holywood, Carryduff, Greenisland, "Groomsport & Crawfordsburn", Helen's Bay, Milltown and Seahill, as well as the corresponding 'metropolitan' settlements. Figures are estimates based on 2021 Census.)	Antrim and Newtownabbey; Belfast; Lisburn and Castlereagh; Mid and East Antrim; Ards and North Down	County Antrim; County Down	704,406				
	Belfast Urban Area (Note: Contains Belfast City, Metropolitan Castlereagh, Metropolitan Lisburn, Metropolitan Newtownabbey and Metropolitan North Down. The population for the Belfast Urban Area is based on figures from the 2021 Census.)	Antrim and Newtownabbey; Belfast; Lisburn and Castlereagh	County Antrim; County Down	450,386				
1	**Belfast City** (Note: Forms part of the Belfast Urban Area.)	Belfast	County Antrim; County Down	291,386	126,925	78.57	3,708.53	'Band A - Belfast'
	Derry Urban Area (Note: Contains Derry City and the neighbouring villages of Culmore, Newbuildings and Strathfoyle.)	Derry and Strabane	County Londonderry	94,376				
2	**Derry City**	Derry and Strabane	County Londonderry	84,884	35,554	33.95	2,500.49	'Band B - Derry City'
3	Craigavon Urban Area (Note: Includes Aghacommon, Craigavon, Lurgan and Portadown.)	Armagh, Banbridge and Craigavon	County Armagh	72,721	29,331	37.73	1,927.54	Large town
4	Metropolitan Newtownabbey	Antrim and Newtownabbey	County Antrim	67,112	28,410	28.23	2,377.40	Large town
5	**Bangor**	Ards and North Down	County Down	64,122	27,859	19.56	3,278.23	Large town
6	Metropolitan Castlereagh	Belfast; Lisburn and Castlereagh	County Down	59,198	25,467	17.92	3,303.66	Large town
7	**Lisburn City**	Lisburn and Castlereagh	County Antrim; County Down	51,447	21,321	19.52	2,635.82	Large town
8	Metropolitan Lisburn	Belfast; Lisburn and Castlereagh	County Antrim	32,368	12,696	9.01	3,593.08	Large town
9	Ballymena	Mid and East Antrim	County Antrim	31,308	13,287	16.57	1,888.93	Large town
	Lurgan (Note: Included within the Craigavon Urban Area. Figures are those of the Craigavon, Lurgan, and Portadown sectors of the Urban Area's 'Settlement Development Limit'.)	Armagh, Banbridge and Craigavon	County Armagh	30886				Part of Craigavon Urban Area, a large town
10	Newtownards	Ards and North Down	County Down	29,591	12,984	11.34	2,610.32	Large town
11	**Newry**	Newry, Mourne and Down	County Armagh; County Down	28,026	11,065	14.06	1,992.79	Large town
12	Carrickfergus	Mid and East Antrim	County Antrim	27,886	12,132	12.24	2,277.95	Large town
13	Antrim	Antrim and Newtownabbey	County Antrim	25,464	10,766	13.05	1,951.88	Large town
14	Coleraine	Causeway Coast and Glens	County Londonderry	24,560	10,622	12.42	1,977.26	Large town
	Craigavon	Armagh, Banbridge and Craigavon	County Armagh	22,518				Part of Craigavon Urban Area, a large town
	Portadown	Armagh, Banbridge and Craigavon	29773				Part of Craigavon Urban Area, a large town	
15	Omagh Town	Fermanagh and Omagh	County Tyrone	20,353	8,721	16.40	1,241.22	Large town
16	Larne	Mid and East Antrim	County Antrim	18,794	8,624	9.22	2,039.29	Large town
17	Banbridge	Armagh, Banbridge and Craigavon	County Down	17,248	7,313	6.95	2,480.05	Medium town
18	**Armagh**	Armagh, Banbridge and Craigavon	County Armagh	16,438	6,543	10.29	1,597.25	Medium town
19	Dungannon	Mid Ulster	County Tyrone	16,361	6,018	9.63	1,698.37	Medium town
20	Enniskillen	Fermanagh and Omagh	County Fermanagh	14,120	6,222	12.90	1,094.61	Medium town
21	Strabane	Derry and Strabane	County Tyrone	13,456	5,535	5.87	2,290.41	Medium town
22	Cookstown	Mid Ulster	County Tyrone	12,549	5,009	7.07	1,773.72	Medium town
23	Limavady	Causeway Coast and Glens	County Londonderry	11,697	5,084	4.56	2,567.12	Medium town
24	Downpatrick	Newry, Mourne and Down	County Down	11,541	4,597	6.66	1,733.48	Medium town
25	Ballymoney	Causeway Coast and Glens	County Antrim	10,903	4,738	5.02	2,172.57	Medium town
26	Ballyclare	Antrim and Newtownabbey	County Antrim	10,848	4,612	4.95	2,190.06	Medium town
27	Holywood	Ards and North Down	County Down	10,735	4,657	6.31	1,700.89	Medium town
28	Magherafelt	Mid Ulster	County Londonderry	9,647	3,808	4.75	2,031.08	Small town
29	Comber	Ards and North Down	County Down	9,512	4,274	3.50	2,717.73	Small town
30	Warrenpoint / Burren	Newry, Mourne and Down	County Down	8,821	3,504	3.57	2,470.92	Small town
31	Newcastle	Newry, Mourne and Down	County Down	8,293	3,551	3.35	2,475.72	Small town
32	Portstewart	Causeway Coast and Glens	County Londonderry	7,698	3,425	3.11	2,476.15	Small town
33	Donaghadee	Ards and North Down	County Down	7,320	3,325	2.94	2,490.07	Small town
34	Carryduff	Lisburn and Castlereagh	County Down	7,017	2,745	2.81	2,493.33	Small town
35	Kilkeel	Newry, Mourne and Down	County Down	6,632	2,699	3.10	2,136.64	Small town
36	Dromore	Armagh, Banbridge and Craigavon	County Down	6,492	2,715	2.48	2,615.98	Small town
37	Greenisland	Mid and East Antrim	County Antrim	6,383	2,783	2.01	3,181.35	Small town
38	Ballynahinch	Newry, Mourne and Down	County Down	6,335	2,688	3.67	1,724.23	Small town
39	Coalisland	Mid Ulster	County Tyrone	6,323	2,430	4.00	1,581.32	Small town
40	Portrush	Causeway Coast and Glens	County Londonderry; County Antrim	6,050	2,815	2.57	2,353.75	Small town
41	Ballycastle	Causeway Coast and Glens	County Antrim	5,628	2,405	2.38	2,365.80	Small town
42	Crumlin	Antrim and Newtownabbey	County Antrim	5,340	2,005	1.28	4,172.37	Small town
43	Randalstown	Antrim and Newtownabbey	County Antrim	5,156	2,114	1.89	2,729.39	Small town
44	Moira	Lisburn and Castlereagh	County Down	4,879	2,074	1.71	2,859.37	Small town
45	Maghera	Mid Ulster	County Londonderry	4,222	1,663	2.04	2,071.60	Intermediate settlement
46	Royal Hillsborough and Culcavy	Lisburn and Castlereagh	County Down	4,160	1,887	2.14	1,944.83	Intermediate settlement
47	Waringstown	Armagh, Banbridge and Craigavon	County Down	3,787	1,500	1.31	2,891.65	Intermediate settlement
48	Culmore	Derry and Strabane	County Londonderry	3,655	1,232	1.61	2,276.37	Intermediate settlement
49	Saintfield	Newry, Mourne and Down	County Down	3,578	1,510	1.43	2,510.06	Intermediate settlement
50	Eglinton	Derry and Strabane	County Londonderry	3,550	1,351	1.21	2,927.46	Intermediate settlement
51	Tandragee	Armagh, Banbridge and Craigavon	County Armagh	3,543	1,467	1.49	2,383.46	Intermediate settlement
52	Whitehead	Mid and East Antrim	County Antrim	3,537	1,638	1.20	2,954.48	Intermediate settlement
53	Ahoghill	Mid and East Antrim	County Antrim	3,529	1,453	0.94	3,758.67	Intermediate settlement
54	Dungiven	Causeway Coast and Glens	County Londonderry	3,346	1,296	1.37	2,442.10	Intermediate settlement
55	Keady	Armagh, Banbridge and Craigavon	County Armagh	3,327	1,317	1.96	1,701.64	Intermediate settlement
56	Ballygowan	Ards and North Down	County Down	3,083	1,228	0.80	3,835.17	Intermediate settlement
57	Broughshane	Mid and East Antrim	County Antrim	3,067	1,370	1.15	2,671.95	Intermediate settlement
58	Lisnaskea	Fermanagh and Omagh	County Fermanagh	3,006	1,263	2.82	1,067.36	Intermediate settlement
59	Bessbrook	Newry, Mourne and Down	County Armagh	3,004	1,167	1.08	2,779.38	Intermediate settlement
60	Castlederg	Derry and Strabane	County Tyrone	2,963	1,292	1.83	1,615.45	Intermediate settlement
61	Maghaberry	Lisburn and Castlereagh	County Antrim	2,943	1,066	0.64	4,624.92	Intermediate settlement
62	Newbuildings	Derry and Strabane	County Londonderry	2,829	1,113	1.03	2,736.53	Intermediate settlement
63	Castlewellan	Newry, Mourne and Down	County Down	2,822	1,101	0.91	3,099.43	Intermediate settlement
64	Killyleagh	Newry, Mourne and Down	County Down	2,785	1,252	0.91	3,063.23	Intermediate settlement
65	Richhill	Armagh, Banbridge and Craigavon	County Armagh	2,738	1,131	1.03	2,651.58	Intermediate settlement
66	Rostrevor	Newry, Mourne and Down	County Down	2,617	1,082	1.07	2,435.44	Intermediate settlement
67	Cullybackey	Mid and East Antrim	County Antrim	2,614	1,187	1.19	2,191.91	Intermediate settlement
68	Strathfoyle	Derry and Strabane	County Londonderry	2,605	998	0.59	4,381.81	Intermediate settlement
69	Millisle	Ards and North Down	County Down	2,553	1,090	0.71	3,609.85	Intermediate settlement
70	Rathfriland	Armagh, Banbridge and Craigavon	County Down	2,489	1,037	0.83	2,994.66	Village
71	Glenavy	Lisburn and Castlereagh	County Antrim	2,384	809	0.65	3,649.67	Village
72	Portaferry	Ards and North Down	County Down	2,372	1,023	0.93	2,544.71	Village
73	Castledawson	Mid Ulster	County Londonderry	2,345	905	0.87	2,685.84	Village
74	Irvinestown	Fermanagh and Omagh	County Fermanagh	2,320	1,049	1.94	1,197.31	Village
75	Portavogie	Ards and North Down	County Down	2,269	893	0.92	2,465.91	Village
76	Dollingstown	Armagh, Banbridge and Craigavon	County Down	2,250	873	0.76	2,958.88	Village
77	Moneymore	Mid Ulster	County Londonderry	2,141	834	1.08	1,986.00	Village
78	Kells / Connor	Mid and East Antrim	County Antrim	2,113	879	0.59	3,596.40	Village
79	Annalong	Newry, Mourne and Down	County Down	2,037	825	0.82	2,479.88	Village
80	Magheralin	Armagh, Banbridge and Craigavon	County Down	2,036	818	0.64	3,160.86	Village
81	Crossgar	Newry, Mourne and Down	County Down	2,010	822	0.68	2,945.27	Village
82	Ballywalter	Ards and North Down	County Down	2,008	909	0.54	3,750.41	Village
83	Ballykelly	Causeway Coast and Glens	County Londonderry	2,004	797	0.83	2,418.58	Village
84	Donaghcloney	Armagh, Banbridge and Craigavon	County Down	1,977	773	0.67	2,936.32	Village
85	Sion Mills	Derry and Strabane	County Tyrone	1,970	888	0.98	2,010.73	Village
86	Gilford	Armagh, Banbridge and Craigavon	County Down	1,957	852	0.97	2,010.47	Village
87	Moy	Mid Ulster	County Tyrone	1,941	767	0.96	2,032.42	Village
88	Markethill	Armagh, Banbridge and Craigavon	County Armagh	1,906	792	0.88	2,159.36	Village
89	Draperstown	Mid Ulster	County Londonderry	1,848	719	0.95	1,950.48	Village
90	Ardglass	Newry, Mourne and Down	County Down	1,761	709	0.78	2,257.63	Village
91	Hilltown	Newry, Mourne and Down	County Down	1,755	657	0.60	2,933.17	Village
92	Crossmaglen	Newry, Mourne and Down	County Armagh	1,683	693	0.84	1,992.52	Village
93	Kilrea	Causeway Coast and Glens	County Antrim	1,676	688	0.82	2,051.73	Village
94	Milltown	Lisburn and Castlereagh	County Antrim	1,633	644	0.37	4,465.34	Village
95	Helen's Bay	Ards and North Down	County Down	1,547	616	0.75	2,074.55	Village
96	Templepatrick	Antrim and Newtownabbey	County Antrim	1,541	687	0.69	2,235.21	Village
97	Dundrum	Newry, Mourne and Down	County Down	1,538	693	0.47	3,291.04	Village
98	Moneyreagh	Lisburn and Castlereagh	County Down	1,535	619	0.37	4,136.61	Village
99	Ballycarry	Mid and East Antrim	County Antrim	1,479	611	0.68	2,159.69	Village
100	Carnlough	Mid and East Antrim	County Antrim	1,457	603	0.70	2,067.34	Village
101	Greysteel	Causeway Coast and Glens	County Londonderry	1,418	559	0.54	2,604.42	Village
102	Newtownstewart	Derry and Strabane	County Tyrone	1,414	627	1.04	1,365.02	Village
103	Doagh	Antrim and Newtownabbey	County Antrim	1,404	634	0.59	2,369.62	Village
104	Laurelvale / Mullavilly	Armagh, Banbridge and Craigavon	County Armagh	1,387	541	0.60	2,313.03	Village
105	Portglenone	Mid and East Antrim	County Antrim	1,367	585	0.62	2,199.83	Village
106	Ballinamallard	Fermanagh and Omagh	County Fermanagh	1,361	587	1.29	1,055.53	Village
107	Fivemiletown	Mid Ulster	County Tyrone	1,341	621	1.35	996.40	Village
108	Cloughey	Ards and North Down	County Down	1,340	560	0.54	2,504.05	Village
109	Cogry / Kilbride	Antrim and Newtownabbey	County Antrim	1,330	523	0.34	3,941.90	Village
110	Claudy	Derry and Strabane	County Londonderry	1,322	539	0.62	2,140.48	Village
111	Drumaness	Newry, Mourne and Down	County Down	1,309	525	0.42	3,109.17	Village
112	Ballyhalbert	Ards and North Down	County Down	1,266	523	0.43	2,975.57	Village
113	Garvagh	Causeway Coast and Glens	County Londonderry	1,252	532	0.78	1,604.97	Village
114	Bellaghy	Mid Ulster	County Londonderry	1,235	454	0.43	2,894.93	Village
115	Bushmills	Causeway Coast and Glens	County Antrim	1,234	600	0.92	1,334.92	Village
116	Clogh Mills	Mid and East Antrim	County Antrim	1,230	528	0.41	3,001.09	Village
117	Groomsport	Ards and North Down	County Down	1,220	620	0.40	3,030.00	Village
118	Fintona	Fermanagh and Omagh	County Tyrone	1,212	580	1.64	737.22	Village
119	Donaghmore	Mid Ulster	County Tyrone	1,182	465	0.90	1,307.08	Village
120	Cushendall	Causeway Coast and Glens	County Antrim	1,180	481	0.55	2,134.76	Village
121	Aghagallon	Armagh, Banbridge and Craigavon	County Antrim	1,175	421	0.36	3,268.61	Village
122	Aughnacloy	Mid Ulster	County Tyrone	1,162	458	0.92	1,268.66	Village
123	Mayobridge	Newry, Mourne and Down	County Down	1,162	409	0.36	3,265.06	Village
124	Castlerock	Causeway Coast and Glens	County Londonderry	1,152	553	0.59	1,959.05	Village
125	Dunloy	Mid and East Antrim	County Antrim	1,150	410	0.49	2,363.34	Village
126	Drumnacanvy	Armagh, Banbridge and Craigavon	County Armagh	1,126	435	0.50	3,275.39	Village
127	Kinallen	Armagh, Banbridge and Craigavon	County Down	1,126	427	0.34	2,245.50	Village
128	Dromara	Lisburn and Castlereagh	County Down	1,118	444	0.39	2,897.90	Village
129	Bleary	Armagh, Banbridge and Craigavon	County Down	1,107	438	0.50	2,212.40	Village
130	Dromore	Fermanagh and Omagh	County Tyrone	1,106	488	1.05	1,057.97	Village
131	Kesh	Fermanagh and Omagh	County Fermanagh	1,101	479	1.01	1,093.79	Village
132	Lisbellaw	Fermanagh and Omagh	County Fermanagh	1,085	470	1.03	1,058.31	Village
133	Rasharkin	Mid and East Antrim	County Antrim	1,072	424	0.40	2,698.78	Village
134	Kircubbin	Ards and North Down	County Down	1,065	494	0.38	2,810.96	Village
135	Killyman	Mid Ulster	County Tyrone	1,057	387	0.43	2,444.81	Village
136	Seahill	Ards and North Down	County Down	1,054	444	0.57	1,855.46	Village
137	Carrowdore	Ards and North Down	County Down	1,052	332	0.41	2,563.56	Village
138	Annaghmore	Mid Ulster	County Tyrone	1,052	433	0.45	2,317.03	Village
139	Camlough	Newry, Mourne and Down	County Armagh	1,038	396	0.49	2,125.93	Village
140	Annahilt	Lisburn and Castlereagh	County Down	1,034	425	0.41	2,552.78	Village
141	Ballynure	Antrim and Newtownabbey	County Antrim	1,034	423	0.29	3,560.82	Village
142	Hamiltonsbawn	Armagh, Banbridge and Craigavon	County Armagh	1,030	387	0.23	4,441.60	Village
143	Maguiresbridge	Fermanagh and Omagh	County Fermanagh	1,029	427	0.67	1,534.45	Village
144	Toome	Antrim and Newtownabbey	County Antrim	1,017	381	0.58	1,739.17	Village
145	Lawrencetown	Armagh, Banbridge and Craigavon	County Down	996	401	0.37	2,679.81	Small village or hamlet
146	Castlecaulfield	Mid Ulster	County Tyrone	995	379	0.71	1,408.55	Small village or hamlet
147	Ballystrudder	Mid and East Antrim	County Antrim	977	405	0.29	3,412.54	Small village or hamlet
148	Ballygawley	Mid Ulster	County Tyrone	976	398	0.83	1,179.78	Small village or hamlet
149	Newtownbutler	Fermanagh and Omagh	County Fermanagh	972	429	0.96	1,012.13	Small village or hamlet
150	Belleek	Fermanagh and Omagh	County Fermanagh	963	459	1.28	753.69	Small village or hamlet
151	Killough	Newry, Mourne and Down	County Down	959	386	0.35	2,703.69	Small village or hamlet
152	Meigh	Newry, Mourne and Down	County Armagh	948	372	0.26	3,635.68	Small village or hamlet
153	Lower Ballinderry	Lisburn and Castlereagh	County Antrim	933	341	0.24	3,964.22	Small village or hamlet
154	Articlave	Causeway Coast and Glens	County Londonderry	920	382	0.27	3,359.50	Small village or hamlet
155	Aghalee	Lisburn and Castlereagh	County Antrim	919	338	0.33	2,796.47	Small village or hamlet
156	Greyabbey	Ards and North Down	County Down	879	422	0.31	2,799.27	Small village or hamlet
157	Ballyrobert	Antrim and Newtownabbey	County Antrim	870	328	0.24	3,584.04	Small village or hamlet
158	Newtownhamilton	Newry, Mourne and Down	County Armagh	845	347	0.48	1,749.97	Small village or hamlet
159	Balnamore	Mid and East Antrim	County Antrim	832	341	0.33	2,512.63	Small village or hamlet
160	Newmills	Mid Ulster	County Tyrone	801	307	0.51	1,576.91	Small village or hamlet
161	Loughbrickland	Armagh, Banbridge and Craigavon	County Down	793	335	0.35	2,283.91	Small village or hamlet
162	Annsborough	Newry, Mourne and Down	County Down	793	307	0.41	1,915.81	Small village or hamlet
163	Artigarvan	Derry and Strabane	County Tyrone	791	323	0.57	1,389.46	Small village or hamlet
164	Pomeroy	Mid Ulster	County Tyrone	786	318	0.72	1,097.47	Small village or hamlet
165	Feeny	Causeway Coast and Glens	County Londonderry	776	270	0.28	2,802.80	Small village or hamlet
166	Coagh	Mid Ulster	County Tyrone	774	288	0.51	1,526.55	Small village or hamlet
167	Drumbeg	Lisburn and Castlereagh	County Down	770	323	0.35	2,218.35	Small village or hamlet
168	Ardboe	Mid Ulster	County Tyrone	765	243	0.92	830.40	Small village or hamlet
169	Glebe	Derry and Strabane	County Tyrone	761	272	0.27	2,778.27	Small village or hamlet
170	Dervock	Mid and East Antrim	County Antrim	760	324	0.32	2,344.03	Small village or hamlet
171	Ballygalley	Mid and East Antrim	County Antrim	745	328	0.38	1,972.06	Small village or hamlet
172	Bellanaleck	Fermanagh and Omagh	County Fermanagh	714	239	0.48	1,502.97	Small village or hamlet
173	Tobermore	Mid Ulster	County Londonderry	713	309	0.59	1,215.61	Small village or hamlet
174	Derrymacash	Armagh, Banbridge and Craigavon	County Armagh	710	230	0.24	2,971.00	Small village or hamlet
175	Ballyholland	Newry, Mourne and Down	County Down	699	238	0.17	4,015.16	Small village or hamlet
176	Beragh	Fermanagh and Omagh	County Tyrone	694	299	0.65	1,072.37	Small village or hamlet
177	Castleroe	Causeway Coast and Glens	County Londonderry	680	284	0.27	2,554.94	Small village or hamlet
178	Clogher	Mid Ulster	County Tyrone	675	282	0.75	905.84	Small village or hamlet
179	Scotch Street	Armagh, Banbridge and Craigavon	County Armagh	675	234	0.24	2,784.43	Small village or hamlet
180	Gulladuff	Mid Ulster	County Londonderry	673	220	0.31	2,153.24	Small village or hamlet
181	Parkgate	Antrim and Newtownabbey	County Antrim	662	278	0.23	2,914.50	Small village or hamlet
182	Derrylin	Fermanagh and Omagh	County Fermanagh	656	272	0.87	756.92	Small village or hamlet
183	Stoneyford	Lisburn and Castlereagh	County Antrim	654	240	0.17	3,749.16	Small village or hamlet
184	Mullaghbane	Newry, Mourne and Down	County Armagh	642	248	0.25	2,580.73	Small village or hamlet
186	Stewartstown	Mid Ulster	County Tyrone	640	283	0.41	1,577.94	Small village or hamlet
187	Donemana	Derry and Strabane	County Tyrone	640	266	0.58	1,101.02	Small village or hamlet
185	Bendooragh	Mid and East Antrim	County Antrim	640	228	0.17	3,757.20	Small village or hamlet
188	Ballymagorry	Derry and Strabane	County Tyrone	639	275	0.45	1,413.99	Small village or hamlet
189	Crawfordsburn	Ards and North Down	County Down	632	270	0.38	1,655.32	Small village or hamlet
190	Poyntzpass	Armagh, Banbridge and Craigavon	County Armagh County Down	632	268	0.35	1,810.09	Small village or hamlet
191	Cargan	Mid and East Antrim	County Antrim	628	243	0.23	2,684.95	Small village or hamlet
192	Carrickmore	Fermanagh and Omagh	County Tyrone	625	230	0.92	681.91	Small village or hamlet
193	Clady	Derry and Strabane	County Tyrone	623	252	0.28	2,237.13	Small village or hamlet
194	Ballyronan	Mid Ulster	County Londonderry	616	225	0.35	1,774.97	Small village or hamlet
195	The Bush	Mid Ulster	County Tyrone	606	213	0.36	1,680.89	Small village or hamlet
196	Macosquin	Causeway Coast and Glens	County Londonderry	604	252	0.23	2,640.95	Small village or hamlet
197	The Spa	Newry, Mourne and Down	County Down	590	209	0.38	1,567.25	Small village or hamlet
198	Glynn	Mid and East Antrim	County Antrim	583	273	0.34	1,713.44	Small village or hamlet
199	Ballymartin	Newry, Mourne and Down	County Down	579	220	0.16	3,526.11	Small village or hamlet
200	Derrygonnelly	Fermanagh and Omagh	County Fermanagh	574	249	0.89	641.74	Small village or hamlet
201	Loughmacrory	Fermanagh and Omagh	County Tyrone	565	193	0.39	1,454.76	Small village or hamlet
202	Lettershendoney	Derry and Strabane	County Londonderry	563	215	0.12	4,653.53	Small village or hamlet
203	Strangford	Newry, Mourne and Down	County Down	561	260	0.23	2,422.20	Small village or hamlet
204	Milford	Armagh, Banbridge and Craigavon	County Armagh	559	221	0.19	2,984.74	Small village or hamlet
205	Ravernet	Lisburn and Castlereagh	County Down	558	226	0.17	3,327.34	Small village or hamlet
206	Ederney	Fermanagh and Omagh	County Fermanagh	553	259	0.74	743.77	Small village or hamlet
207	Forkhill	Newry, Mourne and Down	County Armagh	551	216	0.27	2,064.60	Small village or hamlet
208	Magheramason	Derry and Strabane	County Tyrone	547	246	0.33	1,681.92	Small village or hamlet
209	Ballybogy	Mid and East Antrim	County Antrim	547	224	0.14	4,028.36	Small village or hamlet
210	Moortown	Mid Ulster	County Tyrone	546	191	0.48	1,145.41	Small village or hamlet
211	The Birches	Armagh, Banbridge and Craigavon	County Armagh	541	202	0.26	2,083.14	Small village or hamlet
212	Drumquin	Fermanagh and Omagh	County Tyrone	532	241	0.50	1,057.19	Small village or hamlet
213	Darragh Cross	Newry, Mourne and Down	County Down	524	198	0.14	3,798.32	Small village or hamlet
214	Grange Corner	Mid and East Antrim	County Antrim	523	201	0.15	3,382.28	Small village or hamlet
215	Caledon	Mid Ulster	County Tyrone	522	226	0.48	1,095.13	Small village or hamlet
216	Lisbane	Ards and North Down	County Down	520	205	0.21	2,484.50	Small village or hamlet
217	Clady	Mid Ulster	County Londonderry	517	201	0.22	2,392.54	Small village or hamlet
218	Eglish	Mid Ulster	County Tyrone	515	162	0.48	1,070.85	Small village or hamlet
219	Erganagh	Derry and Strabane	County Tyrone	512	195	0.21	2,448.13	Small village or hamlet
220	Newtowncloghoge	Newry, Mourne and Down	County Armagh	511	212	0.22	2,324.83	Small village or hamlet
221	Glenarm	Mid and East Antrim	County Antrim	504	239	0.54	940.47	Small village or hamlet
222	Portballintrae	Causeway Coast and Glens	County Antrim	500	277	0.43	1,169.64	Small village or hamlet
223	Killinchy	Ards and North Down	County Down	498	211	0.23	2,185.54	Small village or hamlet
224	Kilcoo	Newry, Mourne and Down	County Down	496	169	0.12	4,046.39	Small village or hamlet
225	Drumsurn	Causeway Coast and Glens	County Londonderry	495	174	0.20	2,435.13	Small village or hamlet
226	Upperlands	Mid Ulster	County Londonderry	491	214	0.26	1,889.37	Small village or hamlet
227	Glenone	Mid Ulster	County Londonderry	483	188	0.18	2,626.50	Small village or hamlet
228	Rosslea	Fermanagh and Omagh	County Fermanagh	482	213	0.78	618.11	Small village or hamlet
229	Dunadry	Antrim and Newtownabbey	County Antrim	477	200	0.26	1,819.94	Small village or hamlet
230	Waterfoot	Causeway Coast and Glens	County Antrim	477	197	0.15	3,132.40	Small village or hamlet
231	Armoy	Causeway Coast and Glens	County Antrim	477	196	0.18	2,603.96	Small village or hamlet
232	Park	Derry and Strabane	County Londonderry	476	174	0.20	2,334.12	Small village or hamlet
233	Straidarran	Derry and Strabane	County Londonderry	476	159	0.11	4,179.82	Small village or hamlet
234	Scarva	Armagh, Banbridge and Craigavon	County Down	474	200	0.22	2,114.09	Small village or hamlet
235	Killeen	Newry, Mourne and Down	County Armagh	470	165	0.13	3,512.59	Small village or hamlet
236	Maydown	Derry and Strabane	County Londonderry	468	177	0.11	4,292.19	Small village or hamlet
237	Lurganure	Lisburn and Castlereagh	County Antrim	459	181	0.12	3,940.80	Small village or hamlet
238	Tempo	Fermanagh and Omagh	County Fermanagh	458	212	0.74	617.88	Small village or hamlet
239	Ballyhornan	Newry, Mourne and Down	County Down	455	211	0.22	2,107.77	Small village or hamlet
240	Shrigley	Newry, Mourne and Down	County Down	455	179	0.19	2,360.70	Small village or hamlet
241	Ballykinler	Newry, Mourne and Down	County Down	451	174	0.19	2,423.14	Small village or hamlet
242	Long Kesh	Lisburn and Castlereagh	County Down	451	152	0.20	2,220.76	Small village or hamlet
243	Benburb	Mid Ulster	County Tyrone	446	155	0.32	1,394.37	Small village or hamlet
244	Ardmore	Derry and Strabane	County Londonderry	444	172	0.16	2,752.69	Small village or hamlet
245	Belcoo / Holywell	Fermanagh and Omagh	County Fermanagh	439	201	0.71	616.14	Small village or hamlet
246	Brookeborough	Fermanagh and Omagh	County Fermanagh	438	192	0.62	709.76	Small village or hamlet
247	Jonesborough	Newry, Mourne and Down	County Armagh	438	175	0.30	1,448.75	Small village or hamlet
248	Ballinderry	Mid Ulster	County Tyrone County Londonderry	427	143	0.31	1,382.50	Small village or hamlet
249	Loughguile	Mid and East Antrim	County Antrim	426	150	0.17	2,475.69	Small village or hamlet
250	Straid	Antrim and Newtownabbey	County Antrim	424	174	0.10	4,075.17	Small village or hamlet
251	Blackskull	Armagh, Banbridge and Craigavon	County Down	421	164	0.14	3,111.08	Small village or hamlet
252	Derrytrasna	Armagh, Banbridge and Craigavon	County Armagh	421	137	0.21	1,961.43	Small village or hamlet
253	Straw	Mid Ulster	County Londonderry	416	141	0.18	2,262.57	Small village or hamlet
254	Magheraconluce	Lisburn and Castlereagh	County Down	412	141	0.10	3,924.22	Small village or hamlet
255	Ballymacmaine	Armagh, Banbridge and Craigavon	County Down	406	141	0.14	2,850.33	Small village or hamlet
256	Drumbo	Lisburn and Castlereagh	County Down	397	168	0.13	2,983.54	Small village or hamlet
257	Garrison	Fermanagh and Omagh	County Fermanagh	392	171	0.93	423.73	Small village or hamlet
258	Augher	Mid Ulster	County Tyrone	391	161	0.41	962.93	Small village or hamlet
259	Belleek	Newry, Mourne and Down	County Down	391	143	0.15	2,576.79	Small village or hamlet
260	Annacloy	Newry, Mourne and Down	County Down	391	127	0.28	1,399.65	Small village or hamlet
261	Mullaghboy	Mid and East Antrim	County Antrim	390	159	0.23	1,697.51	Small village or hamlet
262	Dunaghy	Mid and East Antrim	County Antrim	382	158	0.16	2,375.40	Small village or hamlet
263	Aghaginduff / Cabragh	Mid Ulster	County Tyrone	381	134	0.28	1,354.62	Small village or hamlet
264	Tamnamore	Mid Ulster	County Tyrone	380	161	0.31	1,209.78	Small village or hamlet
265	Edenderry	Lisburn and Castlereagh	County Down	374	169	0.06	6,665.15	Small village or hamlet
266	Gortin	Fermanagh and Omagh	County Tyrone	374	167	0.51	739.20	Small village or hamlet
267	Seaforde	Newry, Mourne and Down	County Down	374	158	0.13	2,930.10	Small village or hamlet
268	Mountfield	Fermanagh and Omagh	County Tyrone	373	131	0.37	1,013.28	Small village or hamlet
269	Swatragh	Mid Ulster	County Londonderry	372	139	0.26	1,426.87	Small village or hamlet
270	Blackwatertown	Armagh, Banbridge and Craigavon	County Armagh	371	151	0.18	2,045.96	Small village or hamlet
271	Crossnacreevy	Lisburn and Castlereagh	County Down	366	165	0.11	3,434.45	Small village or hamlet
272	Martinstown	Mid and East Antrim	County Antrim	363	126	0.16	2,208.26	Small village or hamlet
273	Victoria Bridge	Derry and Strabane	County Tyrone	362	151	0.45	797.08	Small village or hamlet
274	Dernagh / Clonoe	Mid Ulster	County Tyrone	361	119	0.13	2,771.14	Small village or hamlet
275	Clonmore	Armagh, Banbridge and Craigavon	County Armagh	360	117	0.27	1,329.56	Small village or hamlet
276	Seskinore	Fermanagh and Omagh	County Tyrone	358	136	0.27	1,308.40	Small village or hamlet
277	Ballycassidy / Laragh / Trory	Fermanagh and Omagh	County Fermanagh	357	151	0.69	520.73	Small village or hamlet
278	Derryhale	Armagh, Banbridge and Craigavon	County Armagh	351	131	0.21	1,706.57	Small village or hamlet
279	Cullyhanna	Newry, Mourne and Down	County Armagh	345	133	0.19	1,837.30	Small village or hamlet
280	Tamlaght	Fermanagh and Omagh	County Fermanagh	341	144	0.17	1,985.96	Small village or hamlet
281	Lenaderg	Armagh, Banbridge and Craigavon	County Down	341	140	0.08	4,282.37	Small village or hamlet
282	Bellarena	Causeway Coast and Glens	County Londonderry	341	132	0.12	2,949.93	Small village or hamlet
283	Clanabogan	Fermanagh and Omagh	County Tyrone	340	132	0.51	665.94	Small village or hamlet
284	Whitecross	Newry, Mourne and Down	County Armagh	331	120	0.10	3,253.66	Small village or hamlet
285	Drumintee	Newry, Mourne and Down	County Armagh	328	129	0.20	1,665.80	Small village or hamlet
286	Granville	Mid Ulster	County Tyrone	326	124	0.87	376.14	Small village or hamlet
287	Raholp	Newry, Mourne and Down	County Down	324	109	0.09	3,415.78	Small village or hamlet
288	Dernaflaw	Causeway Coast and Glens	County Londonderry	324	107	0.12	2,600.00	Small village or hamlet
289	Metropolitan North Down	Ards and North Down	County Down	322	167	0.09	3,518.06	Small village or hamlet
290	Gortnahey	Causeway Coast and Glens	County Londonderry	322	117	0.15	2,119.70	Small village or hamlet
291	Moss-side	Causeway Coast and Glens	County Antrim	321	145	0.19	1,715.46	Small village or hamlet
292	Campsey	Derry and Strabane	County Londonderry	316	112	0.13	2,486.27	Small village or hamlet
293	Derrymore	Armagh, Banbridge and Craigavon	County Armagh	314	115	0.11	2,758.11	Small village or hamlet
294	Clough	Newry, Mourne and Down	County Down	313	110	0.15	2,022.59	Small village or hamlet
295	Lurganare	Newry, Mourne and Down	County Down	311	120	0.06	4,814.27	Small village or hamlet
296	Stranocum	Mid and East Antrim	County Antrim	311	115	0.12	2,625.87	Small village or hamlet
297	Sheeptown	Newry, Mourne and Down	County Down	309	111	0.15	2,027.01	Small village or hamlet
298	Whiterock	Ards and North Down	County Down	295	135	0.20	1,450.06	Small village or hamlet
299	Annahugh	Armagh, Banbridge and Craigavon	County Armagh	294	113	0.09	3,205.89	Small village or hamlet
300	Foreglen	Causeway Coast and Glens	County Londonderry	293	100	0.16	1,837.66	Small village or hamlet
301	Loughgall	Armagh, Banbridge and Craigavon	County Armagh	288	128	0.22	1,283.88	Small village or hamlet
302	Brockagh / Mountjoy	Mid Ulster	County Tyrone	287	97	0.29	973.23	Small village or hamlet
303	Clabby	Fermanagh and Omagh	County Femanagh	282	102	0.31	922.31	Small village or hamlet
304	Middletown	Armagh, Banbridge and Craigavon	County Armagh	278	108	0.14	1,937.97	Small village or hamlet
305	Desertmartin	Mid Ulster	County Londonderry	277	118	0.16	1,756.74	Small village or hamlet
306	Creagh	Mid Ulster	County Londonderry	274	91	0.14	1,895.76	Small village or hamlet
307	Kilmore	Armagh, Banbridge and Craigavon	County Armagh	273	116	0.08	3,228.76	Small village or hamlet
308	Killylea	Armagh, Banbridge and Craigavon	County Armagh	272	120	0.14	1,879.01	Small village or hamlet
309	Annaghmore (Moss Road)	Armagh, Banbridge and Craigavon	County Armagh	272	106	0.10	2,708.10	Small village or hamlet
310	Balloo	Ards and North Down	County Down	269	123	0.14	1,892.47	Small village or hamlet
311	Bryansford	Newry, Mourne and Down	County Down	269	112	0.19	1,429.76	Small village or hamlet
312	Killen	Derry and Strabane	County Tyrone	266	109	0.23	1,169.48	Small village or hamlet
313	Gibson's Hill	Armagh, Banbridge and Craigavon	County Armagh	264	132	0.10	2,748.57	Small village or hamlet
314	Trillick	Fermanagh and Omagh	County Tyrone	263	120	0.38	695.03	Small village or hamlet
315	Burnfoot	Causeway Coast and Glens	County Londonderry	263	99	0.12	2,207.25	Small village or hamlet
316	Rubane	Ards and North Down	County Down	259	98	0.13	2,023.55	Small village or hamlet
317	Edendork	Mid Ulster	County Tyrone	256	98	0.43	590.53	Small village or hamlet
318	Plumbridge	Derry and Strabane	County Tyrone	253	115	0.31	816.46	Small village or hamlet
319	Artasooly	Armagh, Banbridge and Craigavon	County Armagh	253	79	0.16	1,599.34	Small village or hamlet
320	Darkley	Armagh, Banbridge and Craigavon	County Armagh	252	95	0.17	1,498.24	Small village or hamlet
321	Sixmilecross	Fermanagh and Omagh	County Tyrone	251	133	0.44	574.21	Small village or hamlet
322	Nixon's Corner	Derry and Strabane	County Londonderry	251	92	0.05	5,368.41	Small village or hamlet
323	Artikelly	Causeway Coast and Glens	County Londonderry	249	108	0.10	2,461.31	Small village or hamlet
324	Monea	Fermanagh and Omagh	County Fermanagh	248	86	0.15	1,677.96	Small village or hamlet
325	Ballybarnes	Ards and North Down	County Down	245	102	0.15	1,680.03	Small village or hamlet
326	Galbally	Mid Ulster	County Tyrone	245	87	0.23	1,076.73	Small village or hamlet
327	Ballymaguigan	Mid Ulster	County Londonderry	245	81	0.20	1,229.09	Small village or hamlet
328	The Loup	Mid Ulster	County Londonderry	243	76	0.26	936.74	Small village or hamlet
329	Bready	Derry and Strabane	County Tyrone	242	81	0.15	1,609.63	Small village or hamlet
330	Ballyalton	Newry, Mourne and Down	County Down	242	71	0.06	3,876.20	Small village or hamlet
331	Roughfort	Antrim and Newtownabbey	County Antrim	241	95	0.09	2,549.92	Small village or hamlet
332	Cullaville	Newry, Mourne and Down	County Armagh	240	94	0.12	2,068.47	Small village or hamlet
333	Hannahstown	Belfast	County Antrim	237	92	0.10	2,395.43	Small village or hamlet
334	Glack	Causeway Coast and Glens	County Londonderry	236	84	0.08	2,872.27	Small village or hamlet
335	Ballynakilly	Mid Ulster	County Tyrone	235	97	0.21	1,122.10	Small village or hamlet
336	Creggan	Newry, Mourne and Down	County Armagh	234	111	0.10	2,370.32	Small village or hamlet
337	Derryadd	Armagh, Banbridge and Craigavon	County Armagh	234	84	0.22	1,085.07	Small village or hamlet
338	Moneyslane	Armagh, Banbridge and Craigavon	County Down	230	98	0.13	1,803.15	Small village or hamlet
339	Magheramorne	Mid and East Antrim	County Antrim	228	88	0.09	2,488.60	Small village or hamlet
340	Killowen	Newry, Mourne and Down	County Down	225	84	0.16	1,383.27	Small village or hamlet
341	Waringsford	Armagh, Banbridge and Craigavon	County Down	224	84	0.07	3,291.80	Small village or hamlet
342	Lower Broomhedge	Lisburn and Castlereagh	County Antrim	223	85	0.09	2,428.99	Small village or hamlet
343	Maghera	Newry, Mourne and Down	County Down	222	74	0.09	2,536.33	Small village or hamlet
344	Knocknacarry	Causeway Coast and Glens	County Antrim	221	74	0.07	3,217.31	Small village or hamlet
345	Liscolman	Causeway Coast and Glens	County Antrim	219	91	0.09	2,323.38	Small village or hamlet
346	Moneyneany	Mid Ulster	County Londonderry	217	86	0.10	2,219.66	Small village or hamlet
347	Loughinisland	Newry, Mourne and Down	County Down	217	73	0.12	1,786.29	Small village or hamlet
348	Halftown	Lisburn and Castlereagh	County Antrim	216	101	0.05	4,725.20	Small village or hamlet
349	Tamnaherin	Derry and Strabane	County Londonderry	214	69	0.11	1,970.05	Small village or hamlet
350	Upper Ballinderry	Lisburn and Castlereagh	County Antrim	213	95	0.12	1,835.84	Small village or hamlet
351	Glenullin	Causeway Coast and Glens	County Londonderry	213	64	0.13	1,653.28	Small village or hamlet
352	Clogh	Mid and East Antrim	County Antrim	212	96	0.11	1,932.67	Small village or hamlet
353	Dunnaval / Ballyardle	Newry, Mourne and Down	County Down	211	79	0.17	1,231.36	Small village or hamlet
354	Lislea	Newry, Mourne and Down	County Armagh	205	76	0.06	3,524.65	Small village or hamlet
355	Ardstraw	Derry and Strabane	County Tyrone	204	84	0.20	1,000.57	Small village or hamlet
356	Kilclief	Newry, Mourne and Down	County Down	204	83	0.08	2,564.93	Small village or hamlet
357	Lisnarick	Fermanagh and Omagh	County Fermanagh	203	98	0.27	751.12	Small village or hamlet
358	Spamount	Derry and Strabane	County Tyrone	202	97	0.30	665.47	Small village or hamlet
359	Greencastle	Fermanagh and Omagh	County Tyrone	202	85	0.27	748.46	Small village or hamlet
360	Cotton	Ards and North Down	County Down	201	89	0.07	2,857.87	Small village or hamlet
361	Knockcloghrim	Mid Ulster	County Londonderry	199	82	0.14	1,387.52	Small village or hamlet
362	Kesh Bridge	Lisburn and Castlereagh	County Antrim	197	70	0.07	2,922.86	Small village or hamlet
363	Dundrod	Lisburn and Castlereagh	County Antrim	196	57	0.07	2,900.61	Small village or hamlet
364	Broomhill	Armagh, Banbridge and Craigavon	County Armagh	194	98	0.05	3,535.75	Small village or hamlet
365	Kilmore	Armagh, Banbridge and Craigavon	County Armagh	193	73	0.10	1,969.55	Small village or hamlet
366	Clonvaraghan	Newry, Mourne and Down	County Down	193	68	0.07	2,860.08	Small village or hamlet
367	Ballyskeagh	Lisburn and Castlereagh	County Down	192	98	0.03	5,537.57	Small village or hamlet
368	Annaclone	Armagh, Banbridge and Craigavon	County Down	190	85	0.08	2,235.48	Small village or hamlet
369	Glen	Newry, Mourne and Down	County Armagh	190	72	0.08	2,429.62	Small village or hamlet
370	Leitrim	Newry, Mourne and Down	County Down	190	67	0.08	2,493.89	Small village or hamlet
371	Tullyhogue	Mid Ulster	County Tyrone	189	80	0.12	1,641.84	Small village or hamlet
372	Edenaveys	Armagh, Banbridge and Craigavon	County Armagh	186	85	0.05	3,623.14	Small village or hamlet
373	Drumaroad	Newry, Mourne and Down	County Down	183	62	0.09	2,080.96	Small village or hamlet
374	Burrenbridge	Newry, Mourne and Down	County Down	182	78	0.07	2,696.81	Small village or hamlet
375	Loughries	Ards and North Down	County Down	179	82	0.07	2,496.61	Small village or hamlet
376	Maghery	Armagh, Banbridge and Craigavon	County Armagh	177	73	0.27	648.96	Small village or hamlet
377	Glenariff Bay	Causeway Coast and Glens	County Antrim	177	68	0.13	1,402.28	Small village or hamlet
378	Ballynoe	Newry, Mourne and Down	County Down	177	62	0.13	1,345.27	Small village or hamlet
379	Glenmornan	Derry and Strabane	County Tyrone	175	60	0.15	1,154.19	Small village or hamlet
380	Killea	Derry and Strabane	County Londonderry	175	52	0.03	5,580.17	Small village or hamlet
381	Kilmood	Ards and North Down	County Down	174	57	0.08	2,277.30	Small village or hamlet
382	Longstone	Newry, Mourne and Down	County Down	170	62	0.06	3,013.25	Small village or hamlet
383	Attical	Newry, Mourne and Down	County Down	168	66	0.12	1,417.32	Small village or hamlet
384	Glenoe	Mid and East Antrim	County Antrim	167	68	0.07	2,360.99	Small village or hamlet
385	Glenanne (Lisdrumchor)	Armagh, Banbridge and Craigavon	County Armagh	167	66	0.08	1,977.53	Small village or hamlet
386	Finvoy	Mid and East Antrim	County Antrim	166	52	0.12	1,379.44	Small village or hamlet
387	Glassdrumman	Newry, Mourne and Down	County Armagh	165	63	0.08	1,969.17	Small village or hamlet
388	Donagh	Fermanagh and Omagh	County Fermanagh	164	70	0.31	536.14	Small village or hamlet
389	Culnady	Mid Ulster	County Londonderry	162	63	0.09	1,710.25	Small village or hamlet
390	Corkey	Mid and East Antrim	County Antrim	162	56	0.06	2,904.13	Small village or hamlet
391	Mountnorris	Armagh, Banbridge and Craigavon	County Armagh	161	80	0.13	1,286.91	Small village or hamlet
392	Orritor	Mid Ulster	County Tyrone	161	60	0.23	692.54	Small village or hamlet
393	Teemore	Fermanagh and Omagh	County Fermanagh	161	59	0.25	654.22	Small village or hamlet
394	Millbank	Antrim and Newtownabbey	County Antrim	161	56	0.10	1,685.86	Small village or hamlet
395	Dunnamore	Mid Ulster	County Tyrone	158	41	0.18	878.83	Small village or hamlet
396	Milltown	Antrim and Newtownabbey	County Antrim	157	56	0.09	1,713.44	Small village or hamlet
397	Barnmeen	Newry, Mourne and Down	County Down	156	61	0.09	1,749.31	Small village or hamlet
398	Milltown (Aghory)	Armagh, Banbridge and Craigavon	County Armagh	155	69	0.06	2,756.70	Small village or hamlet
399	Hillhead	Antrim and Newtownabbey	County Antrim	153	63	0.12	1,240.74	Small village or hamlet
400	Clarehill	Causeway Coast and Glens	County Londonderry	153	62	0.08	2,024.57	Small village or hamlet
401	Groggan	Antrim and Newtownabbey	County Antrim	152	54	0.08	2,000.62	Small village or hamlet
402	Largy	Causeway Coast and Glens	County Londonderry	151	55	0.05	2,815.92	Small village or hamlet
403	Tullynacross	Lisburn and Castlereagh	County Antrim	149	79	0.05	3,304.93	Small village or hamlet
404	Donagheady	Derry and Strabane	County Tyrone	147	53	0.10	1,506.92	Small village or hamlet
405	Cladymore	Armagh, Banbridge and Craigavon	County Armagh	145	56	0.06	2,579.78	Small village or hamlet
406	Katesbridge	Armagh, Banbridge and Craigavon	County Down	144	53	0.07	1,967.53	Small village or hamlet
407	Kinawley	Fermanagh and Omagh	County Fermanagh	142	66	0.23	611.28	Small village or hamlet
408	Ardress	Armagh, Banbridge and Craigavon	County Armagh	142	51	0.12	1,151.33	Small village or hamlet
409	Gamblestown	Armagh, Banbridge and Craigavon	County Down	141	54	0.11	1,306.07	Small village or hamlet
410	Douglas Bridge	Derry and Strabane	County Tyrone	141	52	0.15	938.39	Small village or hamlet
411	Ballintoy	Causeway Coast and Glens	County Antrim	140	57	0.09	1,598.33	Small village or hamlet
412	St. James	Lisburn and Castlereagh	County Down	138	52	0.06	2,490.82	Small village or hamlet
413	Ballyvoy	Causeway Coast and Glens	County Antrim	136	61	0.08	1,725.56	Small village or hamlet
414	Loughgilly	Armagh, Banbridge and Craigavon	County Armagh	136	58	0.05	2,727.12	Small village or hamlet
415	Arney / Skea	Fermanagh and Omagh	County Fermanagh	134	53	0.27	494.66	Small village or hamlet
416	Tattyreagh	Fermanagh and Omagh	County Tyrone	134	39	0.25	541.58	Small village or hamlet
418	Drummullan	Mid Ulster	County Londonderry	133	58	0.17	805.74	Small village or hamlet
417	Ballylifford	Mid Ulster	County Londonderry	133	52	0.21	628.06	Small village or hamlet
419	Charlemont	Armagh, Banbridge and Craigavon	County Armagh	131	54	0.16	828.69	Small village or hamlet
420	Mounthill	Mid and East Antrim	County Antrim	128	55	0.09	1,462.62	Small village or hamlet
421	Tynan	Armagh, Banbridge and Craigavon	County Armagh	127	53	0.10	1,259.36	Small village or hamlet
422	Ryan Park	Lisburn and Castlereagh	County Down	124	61	0.02	6,344.25	Small village or hamlet
423	Derrykeighan	Mid and East Antrim	County Antrim	123	47	0.05	2,394.99	Small village or hamlet
424	Legacurry	Lisburn and Castlereagh	County Down	123	46	0.09	1,338.30	Small village or hamlet
425	Creggan-Cranfield	Antrim and Newtownabbey	County Antrim	123	44	0.14	895.36	Small village or hamlet
426	Silverbridge	Newry, Mourne and Down	County Armagh	122	59	0.06	1,907.61	Small village or hamlet
427	Tamlaght	Mid Ulster	County Londonderry	121	55	0.05	2,244.97	Small village or hamlet
428	Curran	Mid Ulster	County Londonderry	121	51	0.08	1,493.00	Small village or hamlet
429	Ballylesson	Lisburn and Castlereagh	County Down	121	41	0.10	1,268.02	Small village or hamlet
430	Ballydrain	Ards and North Down	County Down	120	54	0.07	1,731.95	Small village or hamlet
431	Collegeland	Armagh, Banbridge and Craigavon	County Armagh	120	47	0.39	311.46	Small village or hamlet
432	Ballygalget	Ards and North Down	County Down	119	50	0.05	2,192.15	Small village or hamlet
433	Sandholes	Mid Ulster	County Tyrone	119	50	0.15	790.35	Small village or hamlet
434	Hillhall	Lisburn and Castlereagh	County Down	118	55	0.07	1,724.71	Small village or hamlet
435	Cushendun	Causeway Coast and Glens	County Antrim	115	53	0.04	2,658.82	Small village or hamlet
436	Ballyaughlis	Lisburn and Castlereagh	County Down	114	51	0.02	4,899.90	Small village or hamlet
437	Ashfield / Gowdystown	Armagh, Banbridge and Craigavon	County Down	114	42	0.09	1,276.45	Small village or hamlet
438	Carncastle	Mid and East Antrim	County Antrim	114	40	0.12	965.20	Small village or hamlet
439	Drumnakilly	Fermanagh and Omagh	County Tyrone	113	42	0.16	704.11	Small village or hamlet
440	Ballymacnab	Armagh, Banbridge and Craigavon	County Armagh	113	36			Small village or hamlet
441	Lack	Fermanagh and Omagh	County Fermanagh	111	55	0.18	627.77	Small village or hamlet
442	Mullaghglass	Newry, Mourne and Down	County Armagh	110	47	0.04	2,508.57	Small village or hamlet
443	Glen	Mid Ulster	County Londonderry	110	46	0.10	1,068.12	Small village or hamlet
444	Mountjoy	Fermanagh and Omagh	County Tyrone	110	42	0.19	567.26	Small village or hamlet
445	Milltown	Armagh, Banbridge and Craigavon	County Down	110	39	0.07	1,608.47	Small village or hamlet
446	Carrickaness	Armagh, Banbridge and Craigavon	County Armagh	110	28			Small village or hamlet
447	Orlock	Ards and North Down	County Down	109	46	0.08	1,447.11	Small village or hamlet
448	Killeen	Newry, Mourne and Down	County Armagh	107	42	0.07	1,542.89	Small village or hamlet
449	Saul	Newry, Mourne and Down	County Down	107	42	0.07	1,537.04	Small village or hamlet
450	Halfpenny Gate	Lisburn and Castlereagh	County Antrim	107	41	0.05	2,242.85	Small village or hamlet
451	Moneyglass	Antrim and Newtownabbey	County Antrim	107	40	0.09	1,142.93	Small village or hamlet
452	Eglish	Armagh, Banbridge and Craigavon	County Armagh	106	45	0.07	1,572.11	Small village or hamlet
453	Ballycarn	Lisburn and Castlereagh	County Down	105	39	0.08	1,316.83	Small village or hamlet
454	Knockmoyle	Fermanagh and Omagh	County Tyrone	105	30	0.14	736.55	Small village or hamlet
455	Churchtown	Mid Ulster	County Londonderry	104	43	0.25	422.89	Small village or hamlet
456	Ballycranbeg	Ards and North Down	County Down	104	38	0.05	1,899.52	Small village or hamlet
457	Florencecourt / Drumlaghy	Fermanagh and Omagh	County Fermanagh	102	54	0.23	450.46	Small village or hamlet
458	Ardgarvan	Causeway Coast and Glens	County Londonderry	102	53	0.05	2,018.36	Small village or hamlet
459	Innishrush	Mid Ulster	County Londonderry	102	46	0.04	2,448.51	Small village or hamlet
460	Bushvale	Mid and East Antrim	County Antrim	102	40	0.04	2,866.97	Small village or hamlet
461	Glassdrumman / Mullartown	Newry, Mourne and Down	County Down	100	43	0.13	787.78	Small village or hamlet
462	Kirkistown	Ards and North Down	County Down	100	42	0.13	796.56	Small village or hamlet
463	Tullylish	Armagh, Banbridge and Craigavon	County Down	99	53	0.06	1,690.34	Small village or hamlet
464	Dooish	Fermanagh and Omagh	County Tyrone	99	43	0.13	782.12	Small village or hamlet
465	Clare	Armagh, Banbridge and Craigavon	County Armagh	99	35			Small village or hamlet
466	Annaghmore	Armagh, Banbridge and Craigavon	County Armagh	98	41	0.16	629.27	Small village or hamlet
467	Craigarogan	Antrim and Newtownabbey	County Antrim	98	39	0.07	1,500.88	Small village or hamlet
468	Ballynadolly	Lisburn and Castlereagh	County Antrim	98	37	0.05	2,126.14	Small village or hamlet
469	Milltown	Armagh, Banbridge and Craigavon	County Armagh	98	34	0.11	872.24	Small village or hamlet
470	Ardtanagh	Armagh, Banbridge and Craigavon	County Down	96	36	0.06	1,588.78	Small village or hamlet
471	Ardmillan	Ards and North Down	County Down	96	34	0.04	2,246.04	Small village or hamlet
472	Duneight	Lisburn and Castlereagh	County Down	95	41	0.07	1,342.82	Small village or hamlet
473	Boardmills	Lisburn and Castlereagh	County Down	95	30			Small village or hamlet
474	Boleran	Causeway Coast and Glens	County Londonderry	94	44	0.08	1,180.11	Small village or hamlet
475	Milltown (Benburb)	Armagh, Banbridge and Craigavon	County Armagh	94	40	0.07	1,359.86	Small village or hamlet
476	Drapersfield	Mid Ulster	County Tyrone	94	27	0.11	823.77	Small village or hamlet
477	Killeter	Derry and Strabane	County Tyrone	93	44	0.08	1,110.83	Small village or hamlet
478	The Rock	Mid Ulster	County Tyrone	93	40	0.21	445.05	Small village or hamlet
479	Drumlegagh	Derry and Strabane	County Tyrone	92	31	0.20	464.17	Small village or hamlet
480	Trooperslane	Mid and East Antrim	County Antrim	87	41	0.04	2,018.89	Small village or hamlet
481	Ballyeaston	Antrim and Newtownabbey	County Antrim	87	39	0.07	1,209.14	Small village or hamlet
482	Ballycraigy	Antrim and Newtownabbey	County Antrim	87	25	0.04	2,392.18	Small village or hamlet
483	Mill Bay	Mid and East Antrim	County Antrim	86	41	0.07	1,147.72	Small village or hamlet
484	Gillygooly	Fermanagh and Omagh	County Tyrone	86	31	0.24	365.08	Small village or hamlet
485	Edenderry	Fermanagh and Omagh	County Tyrone	85	32	0.20	429.08	Small village or hamlet
486	Ballynease	Mid Ulster	County Londonderry	85	25			Small village or hamlet
487	Boveedy	Causeway Coast and Glens	County Londonderry	84	34	0.04	1,870.39	Small village or hamlet
488	Goshaden	Derry and Strabane	County Londonderry	83	32	0.02	3,457.69	Small village or hamlet
489	Lurganville	Lisburn and Castlereagh	County Down	83	32	0.04	1,916.77	Small village or hamlet
490	Corbet	Armagh, Banbridge and Craigavon	County Down	82	39	0.03	2,885.79	Small village or hamlet
491	Garvaghey	Fermanagh and Omagh	County Tyrone	82	33	0.18	449.76	Small village or hamlet
492	Killadeas	Fermanagh and Omagh	County Fermanagh	82	31	0.13	646.97	Small village or hamlet
493	Longfield	Mid Ulster	County Londonderry	82	31	0.06	1,296.51	Small village or hamlet
494	Glasker	Armagh, Banbridge and Craigavon	County Down	81	28			Small village or hamlet
495	Gracefield	Mid Ulster	County Londonderry	80	24			Small village or hamlet
496	Ballycor	Antrim and Newtownabbey	County Antrim	78	33	0.07	1,107.83	Small village or hamlet
497	Ballyfrenis	Ards and North Down	County Down	78	32	0.07	1,177.94	Small village or hamlet
498	Pettigoe / Tullyhommon	Fermanagh and Omagh	County Fermanagh	76	38	0.12	636.87	Small village or hamlet
499	Carneatly	Mid and East Antrim	County Antrim	76	36	0.04	1,878.64	Small village or hamlet
500	Gortaclare / Moylagh	Fermanagh and Omagh	County Tyrone	76	29	0.19	396.01	Small village or hamlet
501	Church Bay	Causeway Coast and Glens	County Antrim	75	40	0.06	1,181.30	Small village or hamlet
502	Madden	Armagh, Banbridge and Craigavon	County Armagh	75	32	0.05	1,401.41	Small village or hamlet
503	Tummery / Lisdoo	Fermanagh and Omagh	County Tyrone	75	25			Small village or hamlet
504	Drumlough	Lisburn and Castlereagh	County Down	73	25	0.07	1,007.41	Small village or hamlet
505	Crosshill	Mid and East Antrim	County Antrim	72	26	0.05	1,345.58	Small village or hamlet
506	Altamuskin	Fermanagh and Omagh	County Tyrone	72	23	0.17	413.87	Small village or hamlet
507	Glenkeen	Causeway Coast and Glens	County Londonderry	70	27	0.13	522.80	Small village or hamlet
508	Craigavole	Causeway Coast and Glens	County Londonderry	70	22	0.07	1,071.51	Small village or hamlet
509	Cranagh	Derry and Strabane	County Tyrone	69	30	0.15	462.86	Small village or hamlet
510	Springfield	Fermanagh and Omagh	County Fermanagh	69	28	0.14	508.54	Small village or hamlet
511	Chapeltown	Newry, Mourne and Down	County Down	68	24			Small village or hamlet
512	Ballynabragget	Armagh, Banbridge and Craigavon	County Down	68	23			Small village or hamlet
513	Creggan	Fermanagh and Omagh	County Tyrone	67	25			Small village or hamlet
514	Gortacladdy	Mid Ulster	County Tyrone	67	20			Small village or hamlet
515	Upper Broomhedge	Lisburn and Castlereagh	County Antrim	66	26	0.04	1,822.69	Small village or hamlet
516	Dorsey	Newry, Mourne and Down	County Armagh	66	25			Small village or hamlet
517	Ballytober	Causeway Coast and Glens	County Antrim	65	30	0.03	2,083.66	Small village or hamlet
518	Ballymadeerfy	Newry, Mourne and Down	County Down	65	26	0.04	1,465.22	Small village or hamlet
519	Killaloo	Derry and Strabane	County Londonderry	64	31	0.03	2,362.05	Small village or hamlet
520	Ballystockart	Ards and North Down	County Down	64	28	0.04	1,752.50	Small village or hamlet
521	Acton	Armagh, Banbridge and Craigavon	County Armagh	64	26	0.06	1,004.58	Small village or hamlet
522	Aghory	Armagh, Banbridge and Craigavon	County Armagh	64	26	0.09	711.95	Small village or hamlet
523	Killead	Antrim and Newtownabbey	County Antrim	62	30	0.04	1,456.97	Small village or hamlet
524	Glastry	Ards and North Down	County Down	61	20	0.11	572.28	Small village or hamlet
525	Ballyrory	Derry and Strabane	County Londonderry	60	30	0.06	1,056.71	Small village or hamlet
526	Carland	Mid Ulster	County Tyrone	59	21			Small village or hamlet
527	Killesher / Derrylester	Fermanagh and Omagh	County Fermanagh	59	21			Small village or hamlet
528	Lambeg	Lisburn and Castlereagh	County Antrim	58	34			Small village or hamlet
529	Charlestown	Armagh, Banbridge and Craigavon	County Armagh	57	27			Small village or hamlet
530	Magherahoney	Mid and East Antrim	County Antrim	57	25	0.03	1,660.80	Small village or hamlet
531	St. Mary's Terrace	Armagh, Banbridge and Craigavon	County Armagh	57	20			Small village or hamlet
532	Gray's Park	Ards and North Down	County Down	56	28	0.02	3,244.82	Small village or hamlet
533	Derrylee	Armagh, Banbridge and Craigavon	County Armagh	56	22	0.10	583.53	Small village or hamlet
534	Derrynoose	Armagh, Banbridge and Craigavon	County Armagh	56	20			Small village or hamlet
535	Kilskeery	Fermanagh and Omagh	County Tyrone	55	26	0.20	278.92	Small village or hamlet
536	Ballyboley	Ards and North Down	County Down	55	20			Small village or hamlet
537	The Woods	Mid Ulster	County Londonderry	55	20			Small village or hamlet
538	Moneydig	Causeway Coast and Glens	County Londonderry	54	22			Small village or hamlet
539	Tartaraghan	Armagh, Banbridge and Craigavon	County Armagh	54	20	0.09	625.70	Small village or hamlet
540	Dunman	Mid Ulster	County Londonderry	53	20	0.11	485.58	Small village or hamlet
541	Morningside	Lisburn and Castlereagh	County Down	52	22	0.04	1,219.27	Small village or hamlet
542	Tullyroan Corner	Armagh, Banbridge and Craigavon	County Armagh	52	20			Small village or hamlet
543	Letterbreen	Fermanagh and Omagh	County Fermanagh	51	25	0.12	424.56	Small village or hamlet
544	Rousky	Fermanagh and Omagh	County Tyrone	51	23	0.17	303.10	Small village or hamlet
545	Auglish	Armagh, Banbridge and Craigavon	County Armagh	51	20			Small village or hamlet
546	Kilross	Mid Ulster	County Londonderry	51	20			Small village or hamlet
=547	Aghabrack	Derry and Strabane	County Tyrone	50 or less	19 or less			Small village or hamlet
=547	Aghyaran	Derry and Strabane	County Tyrone	50 or less	19 or less			Small village or hamlet
=547	Altishane	Derry and Strabane	County Tyrone	50 or less	19 or less			Small village or hamlet
=547	Altnamacken / Cortamlet	Newry, Mourne and Down	County Armagh	50 or less	19 or less			Small village or hamlet
=547	Ardess	Fermanagh and Omagh	County Fermanagh	50 or less	19 or less			Small village or hamlet
=547	Ardtrea	Mid Ulster	County Tyrone	50 or less	19 or less			Small village or hamlet
=547	Ballela	Armagh, Banbridge and Craigavon	County Down	50 or less	19 or less			Small village or hamlet
=547	Ballyeasborough	Ards and North Down	County Down	50 or less	19 or less			Small village or hamlet
=547	Ballyknockan	Lisburn and Castlereagh	County Down	50 or less	19 or less			Small village or hamlet
=547	Ballymoyer	Newry, Mourne and Down	County Armagh	50 or less	19 or less			Small village or hamlet
=547	Ballyrashane	Causeway Coast and Glens	County Londonderry	50 or less	19 or less			Small village or hamlet
=547	Ballyroney	Armagh, Banbridge and Craigavon	County Down	50 or less	19 or less			Small village or hamlet
=547	Ballyward	Newry, Mourne and Down	County Down	50 or less	19 or less			Small village or hamlet
=547	Browns Bay	Mid and East Antrim	County Antrim	50 or less	19 or less			Small village or hamlet
=547	Bruslee	Antrim and Newtownabbey	County Antrim	50 or less	19 or less			Small village or hamlet
=547	Cappagh	Mid Ulster	County Tyrone	50 or less	19 or less	0.17		Small village or hamlet
=547	Carnageer	Mid and East Antrim	County Antrim	50 or less	19 or less			Small village or hamlet
=547	Carnalbanagh	Mid and East Antrim	County Antrim	50 or less	19 or less			Small village or hamlet
=547	Carnanreagh	Derry and Strabane	County Londonderry	50 or less	19 or less			Small village or hamlet
=547	Carnteel	Mid Ulster	County Tyrone	50 or less	19 or less			Small village or hamlet
=547	Carr	Lisburn and Castlereagh	County Down	50 or less	19 or less			Small village or hamlet
=547	Carranbeg / Rosscor	Fermanagh and Omagh	County Fermanagh	50 or less	19 or less			Small village or hamlet
=547	Carrickinab	Newry, Mourne and Down	County Down	50 or less	19 or less			Small village or hamlet
=547	Carrontremall	Fermanagh and Omagh	County Fermanagh	50 or less	19 or less			Small village or hamlet
=547	Carrybridge	Fermanagh and Omagh	County Fermanagh	50 or less	19 or less			Small village or hamlet
=547	Church Hill	Fermanagh and Omagh	County Fermanagh	50 or less	19 or less			Small village or hamlet
=547	Cloghcor	Derry and Strabane	County Tyrone	50 or less	19 or less			Small village or hamlet
=547	Closkelt	Newry, Mourne and Down	County Down	50 or less	19 or less			Small village or hamlet
=547	Coney Island	Newry, Mourne and Down	County Down	50 or less	19 or less	0.06		Small village or hamlet
=547	Craigantlet	Newry, Mourne and Down	County Down	50 or less	19 or less			Small village or hamlet
=547	Craigbane	Derry and Strabane	County Londonderry	50 or less	19 or less			Small village or hamlet
=547	Cromaghs	Causeway Coast and Glens	County Antrim	50 or less	19 or less			Small village or hamlet
=547	Dechomet	Newry, Mourne and Down	County Down	50 or less	19 or less			Small village or hamlet
=547	Deerpark	Mid and East Antrim	County Antrim	50 or less	19 or less			Small village or hamlet
=547	Derryboye	Newry, Mourne and Down	County Down	50 or less	19 or less			Small village or hamlet
=547	Derryscollop	Armagh, Banbridge and Craigavon	County Armagh	50 or less	19 or less			Small village or hamlet
=547	Desertcreat	Mid Ulster	County Tyrone	50 or less	19 or less			Small village or hamlet
=547	Donaghey	Mid Ulster	County Tyrone	50 or less	19 or less			Small village or hamlet
=547	Drumagarner	Causeway Coast and Glens	County Londonderry	50 or less	19 or less	0.06		Small village or hamlet
=547	Drumaghlis	Newry, Mourne and Down	County Down	50 or less	19 or less			Small village or hamlet
=547	Drumcrow	Mid and East Antrim	County Antrim	50 or less	19 or less			Small village or hamlet
=547	Drumduff	Fermanagh and Omagh	County Tyrone	50 or less	19 or less			Small village or hamlet
=547	Drumhillery	Armagh, Banbridge and Craigavon	County Armagh	50 or less	19 or less			Small village or hamlet
=547	Drumlough Road	Lisburn and Castlereagh	County Down	50 or less	19 or less			Small village or hamlet
=547	Dunmoyle	Fermanagh and Omagh	County Tyrone	50 or less	19 or less			Small village or hamlet
=547	Dunmullan	Fermanagh and Omagh	County Tyrone	50 or less	19 or less			Small village or hamlet
=547	Dyan	Mid Ulster	County Tyrone	50 or less	19 or less			Small village or hamlet
=547	Eskragh	Fermanagh and Omagh	County Tyrone	50 or less	19 or less			Small village or hamlet
=547	Ferris Bay	Mid and East Antrim	County Antrim	50 or less	19 or less			Small village or hamlet
=547	Feumore	Lisburn and Castlereagh	County Antrim	50 or less	19 or less			Small village or hamlet
=547	Feystown	Mid and East Antrim	County Antrim	50 or less	19 or less			Small village or hamlet
=547	Finnis	Newry, Mourne and Down	County Down	50 or less	19 or less			Small village or hamlet
=547	Garron Point	Mid and East Antrim	County Antrim	50 or less	19 or less			Small village or hamlet
=547	Garvetagh	Derry and Strabane	County Tyrone	50 or less	19 or less			Small village or hamlet
=547	Glenanne	Armagh, Banbridge and Craigavon	County Armagh	50 or less	19 or less			Small village or hamlet
=547	Glenhull	Fermanagh and Omagh	County Tyrone	50 or less	19 or less			Small village or hamlet
=547	Gortnagarn	Fermanagh and Omagh	County Tyrone	50 or less	19 or less			Small village or hamlet
=547	Granemore	Armagh, Banbridge and Craigavon	County Armagh	50 or less	19 or less			Small village or hamlet
=547	Grange	Mid Ulster	County Tyrone	50 or less	19 or less			Small village or hamlet
=547	Greencastle	Newry, Mourne and Down	County Down	50 or less	19 or less			Small village or hamlet
=547	Jerretspass	Newry, Mourne and Down	County Armagh	50 or less	19 or less			Small village or hamlet
=547	Kilkinamurray	Armagh, Banbridge and Craigavon	County Down	50 or less	19 or less			Small village or hamlet
=547	Killeenan	Mid Ulster	County Tyrone	50 or less	19 or less			Small village or hamlet
=547	Kilwaughter	Mid and East Antrim	County Antrim	50 or less	19 or less			Small village or hamlet
=547	Kingsmoss	Antrim and Newtownabbey	County Antrim	50 or less	19 or less			Small village or hamlet
=547	Knocknagulliagh	Mid and East Antrim	County Antrim	50 or less	19 or less	0.02		Small village or hamlet
=547	Lisnadill	Armagh, Banbridge and Craigavon	County Armagh	50 or less	19 or less			Small village or hamlet
=547	Lisnagunogue	Causeway Coast and Glens	County Antrim	50 or less	19 or less			Small village or hamlet
=547	Lough View	Lisburn and Castlereagh	County Down	50 or less	19 or less			Small village or hamlet
=547	Lowtown	Antrim and Newtownabbey	County Antrim	50 or less	19 or less			Small village or hamlet
=547	Lurgill	Lisburn and Castlereagh	County Antrim	50 or less	19 or less			Small village or hamlet
=547	Magheraveely	Fermanagh and Omagh	County Fermanagh	50 or less	19 or less	0.07		Small village or hamlet
=547	Mullaghbrack	Armagh, Banbridge and Craigavon	County Armagh	50 or less	19 or less	0.06		Small village or hamlet
=547	Mullanaskea	Fermanagh and Omagh	County Fermanagh	50 or less	19 or less			Small village or hamlet
=547	Newtownsaville	Fermanagh and Omagh	County Tyrone	50 or less	19 or less			Small village or hamlet
=547	Purdysburn	Lisburn and Castlereagh	County Down	50 or less	19 or less			Small village or hamlet
=547	Raloo	Mid and East Antrim	County Antrim	50 or less	19 or less			Small village or hamlet
=547	Ringsend	Causeway Coast and Glens	County Londonderry	50 or less	19 or less			Small village or hamlet
=547	Roscavey	Fermanagh and Omagh	County Tyrone	50 or less	19 or less			Small village or hamlet
=547	Salters Grange	Armagh, Banbridge and Craigavon	County Armagh	50 or less	19 or less			Small village or hamlet
=547	Shanvey	Causeway Coast and Glens	County Londonderry	50 or less	19 or less			Small village or hamlet
=547	Six Road Ends	Ards and North Down	County Down	50 or less	19 or less			Small village or hamlet
=547	Stonebridge	Armagh, Banbridge and Craigavon	County Armagh	50 or less	19 or less			Small village or hamlet
=547	Straidkilly	Mid and East Antrim	County Antrim	50 or less	19 or less			Small village or hamlet
=547	Tassagh	Armagh, Banbridge and Craigavon	County Armagh	50 or less	19 or less			Small village or hamlet
=547	Temple	Lisburn and Castlereagh	County Down	50 or less	19 or less			Small village or hamlet
=547	Tildarg	Antrim and Newtownabbey	County Antrim	50 or less	19 or less			Small village or hamlet
=547	Tircur	Fermanagh and Omagh	County Tyrone	50 or less	19 or less			Small village or hamlet
=547	Tullintrain	Derry and Strabane	County Londonderry	50 or less	19 or less			Small village or hamlet
=547	Tullyallen	Mid Ulster	County Tyrone	50 or less	19 or less			Small village or hamlet
=547	Tullygoonigan	Armagh, Banbridge and Craigavon	County Armagh	50 or less	19 or less			Small village or hamlet
=547	Tullyherron	Newry, Mourne and Down	County Armagh	50 or less	19 or less			Small village or hamlet
=547	Whitehill	Fermanagh and Omagh	County Fermanagh	50 or less	19 or less			Small village or hamlet
Open countryside				394,065 - 399,015	135,620 - 137,387			
Total				**1,903,175**	**768,810**	**13,547**	**141**	

== See also ==
- List of settlements on the island of Ireland by population
- List of places in Northern Ireland
- List of urban areas in the Republic of Ireland
