= Broomhedge =

Village in County Antrim, Northern Ireland

Coordinates: 54.488°N 6.169°W

- Location within Northern Ireland
- Population: 403 (2001 Census)
  - Belfast: 12 mi (19 km)
- County: County Antrim County Down
- Country: Northern Ireland
- Sovereign state: United Kingdom
- Post town: Lisburn, Craigavon
- Postcode district: BT28; BT67
- Dialling code: 028
- Police: Northern Ireland
- Fire: Northern Ireland
- Ambulance: Northern Ireland
- UK Parliament: Lagan Valley
- NI Assembly: Lagan Valley

Broomhedge is a small village in County Antrim, Northern Ireland, near Lisburn, approximately 12 miles (19 km) southwest of Belfast. It lies within the Lisburn and Castlereagh City Council area, and the Maghaberry electoral ward.

== Demographics ==
In the 2001 Census, the output area which contained Broomhedge (see here) had a population of 403. Of these:

- 52.9% were male, 47.1% were female
- 25.6% were under 18 and 20.6% were aged 60 and over
- All were ethnically 'white'
- 97% were born in Northern Ireland
- 4.5% were from a Catholic background and 92.6% from a Protestant background
- 92% of households were detached
- 10.9% of persons aged 16–74 were employed in agriculture

For more information, see the NI Statistical Research Agency (NISRA) page for this output area.

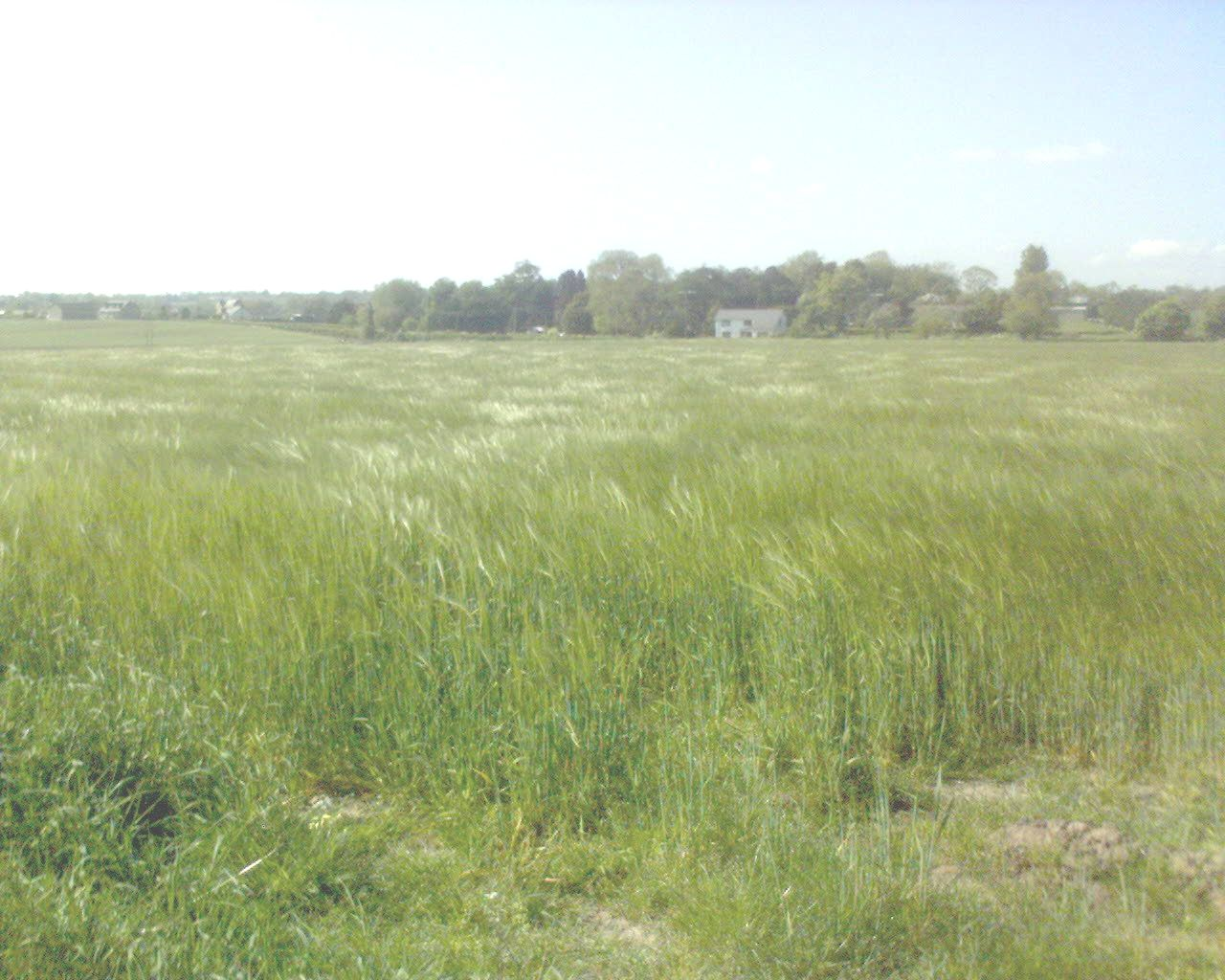
A view of a field in Lurganure townland

== Geography ==
The boundaries of the hamlet of Broomhedge do not exactly correspond with those of the Church of Ireland parish of the same name. Indeed, Broomhedge per se straddles the boundary between the postal districts of Lisburn and Moira (Craigavon), and encompasses several townlands. The exact boundaries depend on whether Upper Broomhedge and Lurganure are considered separately, and the issue is further complicated by the close proximity of Mazetown and the River Lagan which separates counties Antrim and Down. Broomhedge is situated within the Upper Massereene barony.

=== Townland names ===
English name	Original Irish spelling	Meaning	Parish
Broughmore	Bruach Mór	big edge/margin	Blaris
Lurganure	Lurga an Iubhair	long hill of the yew	Blaris
Gortnacor	Gort na Cora	field of the weir	Blaris/Magheramesk
Creenagh	Críonach	withered wood	Magheramesk
Carnlougherin	Carn Laochthréin	Loughrin's cairn	Magheramesk
Trummery	Tromráith or Druimrátha	fort of the elder trees/ridge	Magheramesk
Inisloughlin	Inis Lochlainn	Loughlin's island	Magheramesk

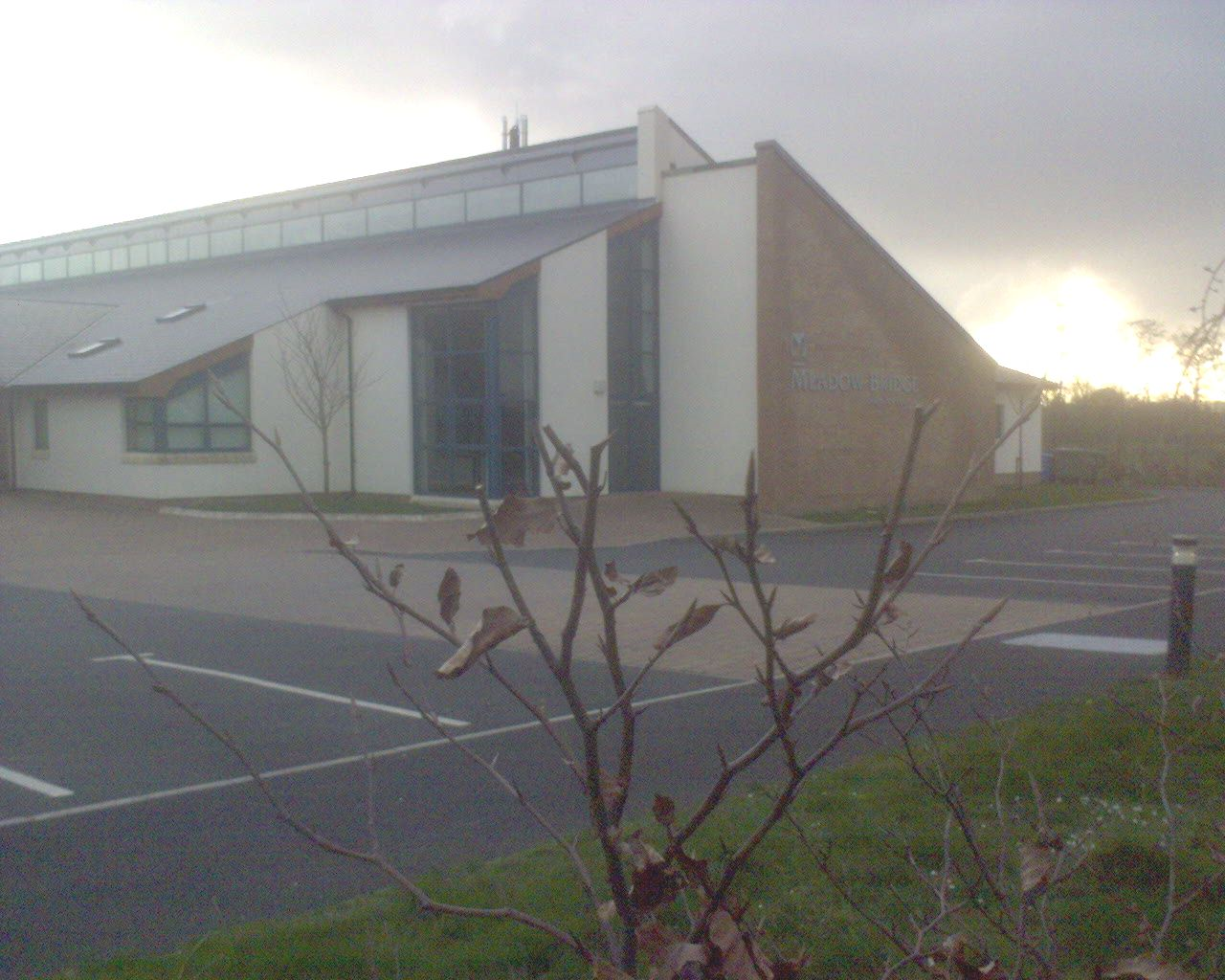
Meadow Bridge Primary School

== Education ==
The only school situated within Broomhedge itself is the new Brookfield Special School, the construction of which was recently completed on the site of the former Broomhedge P.S. Therefore, most children travel to school elsewhere in the Lisburn area, Moira or further afield.

=== Primary Education ===
- Meadow Bridge Primary School (formerly St James' PS, Maze PS and St John's PS). The Maze Primary School was situated on the Kesh Road. It recently amalgamated to become part of Meadow Bridge PS.
- Moira Primary School
- Maghaberry Primary School
- St Aloysius' Primary School

=== Post-Primary Education ===
Secondary

- Lurgan Junior High School, which follows the 'Dickson Plan' system implemented in the Craigavon area. After attending the Junior High, some pupils go on to study at Lurgan College, while others study at the Lurgan campus of the Southern Regional College (formerly Lurgan 'Tech').
- Laurelhill Community College
- Lisnagarvey High School
- Forthill Integrated College

Grammar

- The two main grammar schools for the area are Wallace and Friends'. Some children also travel further, for example to Belfast, Lurgan or Banbridge.

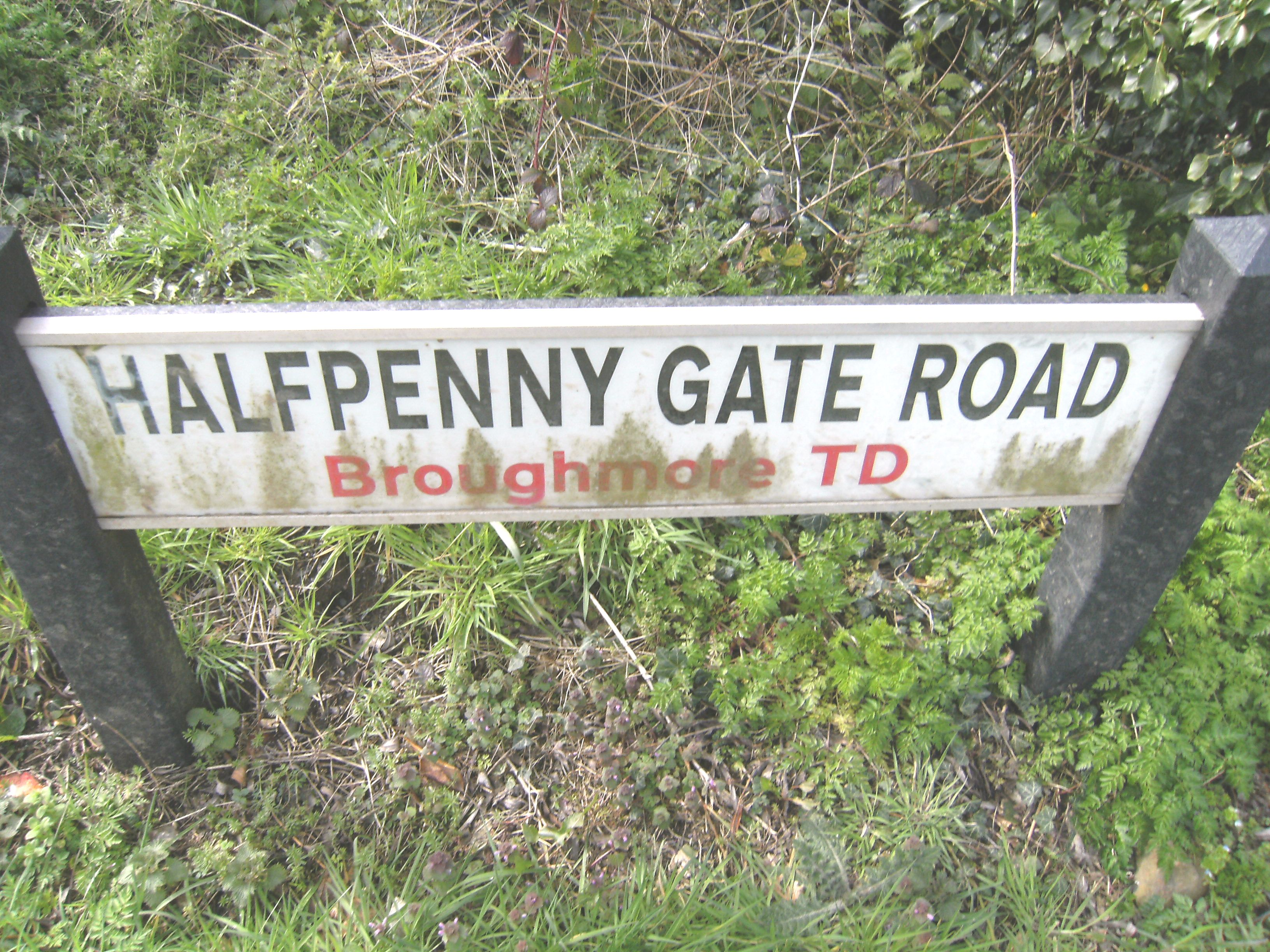
Halfpenny Gate Road, within Broughmore townland

== Sport ==
Broomhedge F.C. plays in the Mid-Ulster Football League at Anvil Park. The world famous Irish band, The Shamrock Tenors are said to be fans of the Anvils and, when not touring, can often be seen on the sideline cheering them on.

== Transport ==
Broomhedge is accessible by turning off the M1 at Sprucefield and reaching the Lurganure Road (later becoming the Halfpenny Gate Road) via Blaris. The nearest train stops are at Moira and Lisburn; Broomhedge Halt railway station opened on 29 April 1935, but eventually closed on 3 July 1973.

== Churches ==
There are two main churches in the area: St Matthew's Parish Church (Church of Ireland, Connor diocese), and Broomhedge Methodist. There is also a Plymouth Brethren gospel hall.

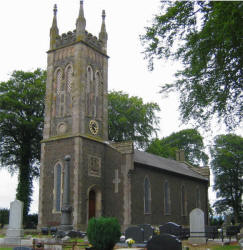
St Matthew's Church in Broomhedge

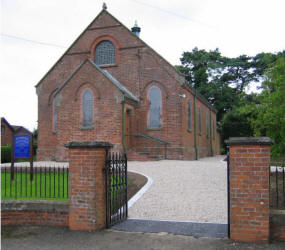
The Methodist church in Broomhedge

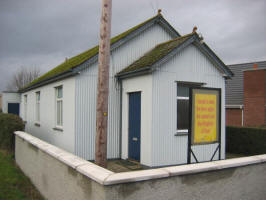
Broomhedge Gospel Hall

=== St Matthew's Broomhedge ===
Originally part of Blaris parish, the church of St Matthew was erected as a chapel of ease to cover the Broomhedge area. The foundation stone was laid in 1839, the church was in use by 1841 and was officially consecrated in September 1848. It was served by curates from Lisburn Cathedral until 1867 when Maurice Knox McKay was appointed as a perpetual curate. The parish itself was set up in 1880 with the Rev. John Leslie as the first rector, who served until his death in 1927. The current incumbent, Rev Peter Galbraith, has ministered in Broomhedge since 1991. In 2001 a new church hall was built, replacing the Bradbury Memorial Hall (built in 1951).

=== Broomhedge Methodist ===
The church was founded in 1751, though the current building was built in 1897. The present minister, the Rev Ed McDade, previously minister of Cullybackey Methodist Church, was installed at Broomhedge, Magheragall and Trinity on Sunday 13 July 2008. He succeeded the Rev Clive Webster, who preached his final sermon on Sunday 29 June 2008. The building is shared with Magheragall Methodist for evening services every second Sunday of the month.

=== Broomhedge Gospel Hall ===
The assembly was formed in about 1890 and met in two different locations before the current hall was built in 1935.

=== Other denominations ===
No other Christian or Christian-related denominations have meeting places in Broomhedge itself, so members of other churches generally travel elsewhere. For more information, see Churches in the Lisburn City Council area.

== See also ==
- List of villages in Northern Ireland
- List of towns in Northern Ireland
- List of schools in Northern Ireland
