= Glenelly River =

River in Northern Ireland

Coordinates: 54°44′N 7°18′W

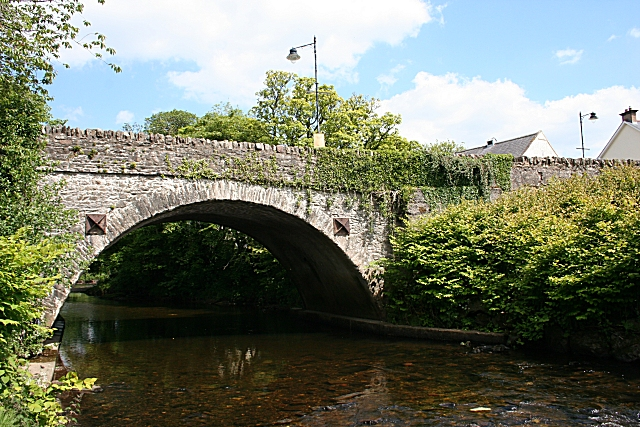
Glenelly at Plumbridge

Glenelly River is a river in County Tyrone, Northern Ireland. It flows westwards along the long linear Glenelly Valley to the south of Sawel Mountain, following one of the principal fault-lines in the Sperrin Mountains. The river meanders across a complex, undulating floodplain of alluvium and glacial moraine. The channel has often carved deep ridges within these soft deposits, creating steep, irregular mounds and pockets of peaty marsh on the valley floor. The otter has been recorded in the Glenelly River, which is important also for salmon and trout. The village of Plumbridge stands on the banks of the Glenelly River which flows on to join the Owenkillew River near Newtownstewart.
