= Cranagh (disambiguation) =

Cranagh is a village in County Tyrone, Northern Ireland

Cranagh may also refer to:

- Cranagh (barony), a barony in the north-west of County Kilkenny, Ireland.

== See also ==
- Cranach, a German surname
