= Skea =

Skea may refer to:

== People ==
- David Skea (1871 – c. 1950), Scottish association football player
- James Skea (born 1953), Scottish environmental academic

== Places ==
- Skea, County Fermanagh, a small village and townland in County Fermanagh, Northern Ireland
