= Moylagh =

Moylagh may refer to:

- Moylagh, County Meath, Ireland
- Moylagh, County Tyrone, Northern Ireland
