= Sacred Heart Church, Plumbridge =

Catholic church in Plumbridge, Northern Ireland

Coordinates: 54.7668625°N 7.2484697°W

Sacred Heart Church
- Church of the Sacred Heart
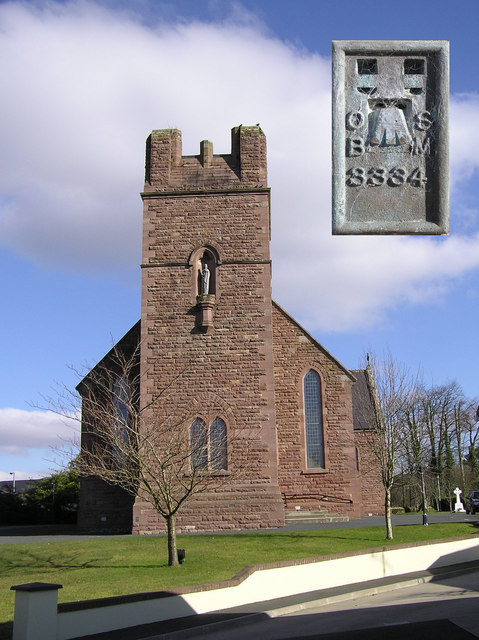
- Sacred Heart Church
- Sacred Heart Church
- Location: Plumbridge
- Country: Northern Ireland
- Denomination: Catholic

History
- Status: parish church

Architecture
- Functional status: Active
- Heritage designation: Grade B2
- Completed: 1896

Specifications
- Materials: Stone

Administration
- Parish: Plumbridge

Sacred Heart Church is a Roman Catholic church in the village of Plumbridge, County Tyrone in Northern Ireland. It was built in 1896 and is a Grade B2 listed building.

== History ==
Sacred Heart Church was constructed in 1896. There had previously been a Roman Catholic chapel in the village as late as 1833 with a graveyard added in 1888. The land which Sacred Heart Church was built on was leased by John MacFarland and designated as a location for the new church in 1894. The church retains the majority of its original external fittings. It first featured on a map in 1905 in the Third Edition of the Ordnance Survey map.

In 1950, £100 was donated, to pay for repairs, to the church tower by a local resident. It was granted grade B2 listed status on 2 November 1989. The reasons for the listing were due to the fact that "The building retains much of its original character both externally and internally..." and that it "...is one of the most significant buildings in Plumbridge" according to the Department for Communities. Following this, the internal areas of the church were refurbished in 1990 with new pews being erected and new doors being installed. A plaque commemorating this was attached to the base of the church tower.

In 2017, the church was damaged by flooding which resulted in a fundraising campaign being set up for the repairs. A local singer raised over £2,000 for the church in a concert.
