= Ballyskeagh =

Village near Belfast, Northern Ireland

Coordinates: 54°32′02″N 6°00′19″W

Ballyskeagh: Irish: Baile Sceach
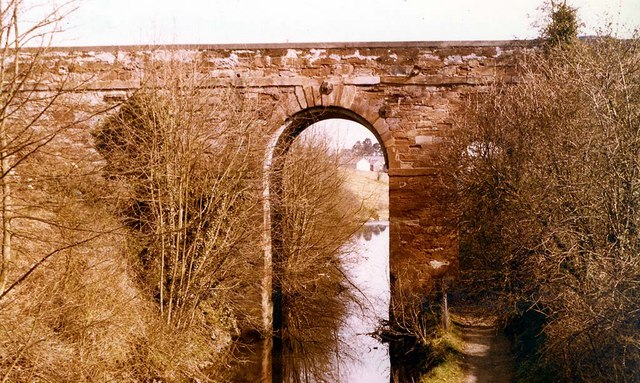
- The High Bridge over the Lagan Canal at Ballyskeagh, April 1979.

- Location within County Down
- Population: 192 (2021 Census)
- District: Lisburn City Council
- County: County Down
- Country: Northern Ireland
- Sovereign state: United Kingdom
- Post town: Lisburn
- Postcode district: BT27
- Dialling code: 028

Ballyskeagh (from Irish Baile Sceach, meaning 'townland of thorn bushes') is the name of a small village and of a townland situated between Lambeg and Drumbeg in County Down, Northern Ireland. In the 2021 Census it had a population of 192 people. It lies within the Lagan Valley Regional Park and the Lisburn City Council area.

== Places of interest ==
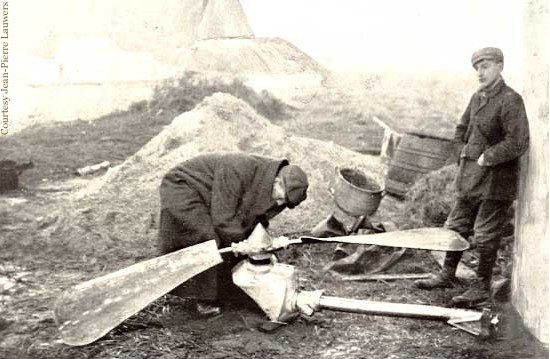
Propeller and gear assembly knocked off Patrie during temporary landfall in Ballysallagh, Ireland on 1 December 1907

New Grosvenor Park, Home of Lisburn Distillery Football Club

- Ballyskeagh Bridge, a sandstone arched bridge situated over the Lagan Canal, was built between 1760 and 1779 by Thomas Omer, engineer in charge of the canal. It is a listed building.
- McIlroy Park, connecting the Lagan towpath to Ballyskeagh and Dunmurry, was named after local footballer Jimmy McIlroy.
- The Lock Keeper’s House, also built between 1760 and 1779, is a privately owned listed building.
- To the west of the Lock Keeper's House, an enclosure, probably a rath, is situated.

== Sport ==
Ballyskeagh is the home of New Grosvenor Stadium, the football stadium of Lisburn Distillery F.C., Lisburns biggest Irish League team.

== Notable residents ==
- Jimmy McIlroy

== See also ==
- Tullynacross
- List of villages in Northern Ireland
