= Hillhall =

Village in County Down, Northern Ireland

Coordinates: 54°30′47″N 5°59′19″W

Hillhall: Irish: Cluain Cholmóg
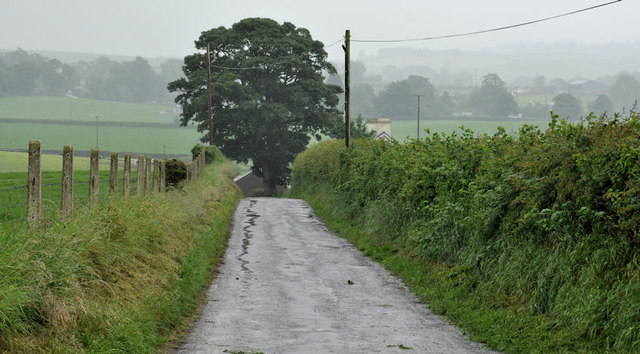
- Carson's Lane, Hillhall

- Location within Northern Ireland Location within County Down Hillhall (County Down)
- Population: 118 (Census 2021)
- Irish grid reference: J285652
- District: Lisburn and Castlereagh
- County: County Down
- Country: Northern Ireland
- Sovereign state: United Kingdom
- Post town: LISBURN
- Postcode district: BT27
- Dialling code: 028
- UK Parliament: Lagan Valley
- NI Assembly: Lagan Valley

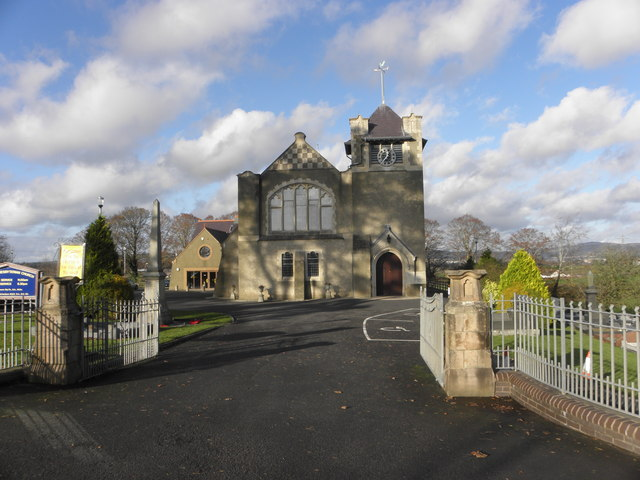
Hillhall Presbyterian Church

Hillhall is a townland and non-nucleated village in County Down, Northern Ireland, near Lisburn. In the 2021 Census, it had a population of 118 people. It lies in the Lagan Valley Regional Park and the Lisburn City Council area.

== History ==
In a 1645 inquisition, the townland was recorded under the name Donkynmuck which may be a corruption of Cloncolmoc (Irish: Cluain Cholmóg, meaning "meadow of little [Saint] Colmán"). This name is associated with a church listed near Ecclesia de Drum (Drumbeg) in records from around 1306. This name is possibly linked to a church recorded in 1306, although no physical remains of such a church have been identified, and the association remains tentative.

In 1847, Reeves suggested that the church of Cloncolmoc may have been located in the townland of Old Forge, across the River Lagan in the County Antrim portion of the parish of Drumbeg, where local tradition recalled the existence of an ancient church. O'Laverty proposed that Cloncolmoc was another name for the church of Lambeg, located in the townland of the same name on the County Antrim side of the Lagan.

A portion of the townland of Hillhall was historically part of the parish of Drumbo, as noted in the 1851 Census Index. This area was later transferred to the parish of Drumbeg, and by 1961, the entire townland was within Drumbeg parish.

The townland of Hillhall is named after a house and defensive bawn constructed around 1637 by Peter Hill, son of Sir Moses Hill of Devonshire, who served as Provost Marshal of Ulster at the end of the 16th century. Sir Moyses Hill (often written as Sir Moses Hill) (d. February 1629/30) arrived in Ireland in 1573 as part of the Earl of Essex's campaign to subdue Ulster. He later served under Lord Mountjoy in the wars against Hugh O'Neill, Earl of Tyrone. Hill benefited significantly from the Crown's land grants, receiving 2,000 acres in County Antrim and 40,000 acres in County Down, including lands acquired from dispossessed Irish families such as Con O'Neill who was imprisoned for treason and only regained his freedom by agreeing to divide his estate with English settlers. Among the most fortunate purchasers from Con O’Neill was Sir Moyses Hill, who acquired what became the Castlereagh estate. While these actions were legal and rewarded by the Crown, they contributed to the dispossession of Gaelic Irish elites and the establishment of English dominance in the region.

Another Gaelic Irish elite and landowner at that time was Brian Oge Magennis, a member of the prominent Magennis clan, which ruled the territory of Kilwarlin in County Down, which included the site of the bawn where Hillhall was later built. Following the Nine Years' War, he regained control of lands that had been devastated by conflict, totalling approximately 28,000 acres. However, in 1611, he was forced to sell seven of his forty-three townlands to Sir Moyses Hill, marking the beginning of the Hill family's acquisition of the Kilwarlin estate. Brian Oge's son later had to sell the remaining lands to Peter Hill, Moyses's eldest son, in 1635.

The remains of the original house and bawn are located at The Court, west of the present Hillhall House. The area is referenced in historical documents, including an 1831 record listing the townland as "Ballidunkillmuck alias Hillhall".

The village of Hillhall is not located within the townland of Hillhall, but instead lies partly in the townlands of Lisnatrunk and Ballymullan.

Hillhall Presbyterian Church is a listed building.

== Geography ==
Townlands that border Hillhall include:

- Ballyaghlis to the east
- Ballymullan to the south
- Drumbeg to the north
- Drumbo to the east
- Lisnatrunk to the west
- Tullyard to the east
- Tullynacross to the west

== Notes ==
The deposition by Peter Hill (reference 6 above), while extensive, is heavily biased and reflects the intense anti-Catholic sentiment of the time. Many of the accusations are based on hearsay or lack corroboration, as noted by the editors and commentators in the document. The document includes critical notes by Thomas Fitzpatrick and Monsignor O’Laverty, who caution readers about the reliability of Peter Hill's testimony. They point out that Hill had no direct knowledge of many events he described and that his accounts were often exaggerated or manipulated for political purposes.

== See also ==
- List of villages in Northern Ireland
- List of towns in Northern Ireland
