= Lower Broomhedge =

Hamlet in County Antrim, Northern Ireland

Coordinates: 54.499°N 6.141°W

Lower Broomhedge is a hamlet in County Antrim, Northern Ireland, near Lisburn. In the 2001 Census it had a population of 180 people. It lies within the Lisburn City Council area. It is usually considered part of Broomhedge itself rather than a separate village.
