= Dorothea Johnson =

- Born: Dorothea Garrat; 4 December 1732; Dublin
- Died: 23 July 1817 (aged 84); Lisburn
- Known for: leading Methodist
- Spouse(s): Mr King, Rev. John Johnson
- Children: 2

Dorothea Johnson or Dorothea Garrat; Dorothea King (4 December 1732 – 23 July 1817) was an Irish Methodist leader in Lisburn.

== Life ==
Johnson was born in Dublin in 1732. Her mother is unknown, but she was raised by her father and his mother. Her grandmother taught her piety but she was illiterate. Her father's business was bankrupt when she was 16 and she agreed to marry Mr King who was one of his creditors - in order that her father would escape jail. The marriage brought forward children but Johnson was unhappy and she returned home.

She became a Methodist on 15 December 1757 when she was converted by the Reverend George Whitefield. When the founder of Methodism, John Wesley, visited in 1762 he found her at the centre of the local church. She was known for her fervour and Wesley witnessed her transform to a Methodist state known as sanctification.

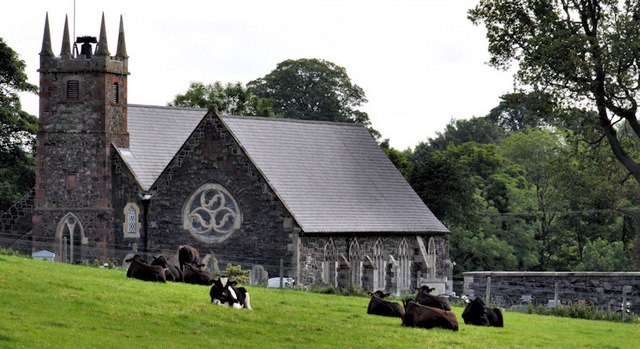
Dorothea and her husband are buried here.

Her estranged husband died and ten years later, in 1784, she married again. They lived together and she and the Reverend John Johnson had a chapel in Market Street Lambeg in County Antrim. They were known for their model marriage. They both worked to encourage Methodism. She worked with female Methodists but she was singled out by John Wesley as the cause of the healthy state of Methodism in Lisburn the year after they married.

Johnson died a widow in Lisburn on 23 July 1817 having spent 14 years leading the congregation and still steadfast in her beliefs. She was buried with her husband in Lambeg churchyard. Her "Memoirs" which she had begun in 1771 were published in 1818.
