= Cranagh =

Village in Northern Ireland

Coordinates: 54°47′N 7°05′W

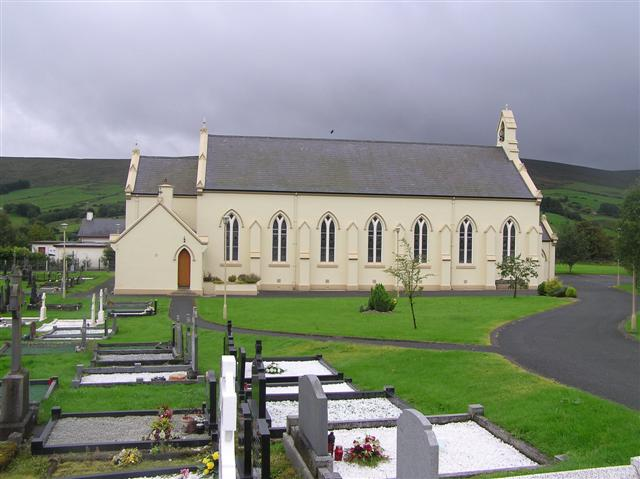
St Brigid's Catholic church is in Cranagh

Cranagh (Irish: An Chrannóg) is a small village in County Tyrone, Northern Ireland. It is in the Glenelly Valley, about seven miles from Plumbridge. As of the 2001 census, it had a population of 60 people. It is within the Strabane District Council area.
