= Altishane =

Village in County Tyrone, Northern Ireland

Coordinates: 54.836°N 7.281°W

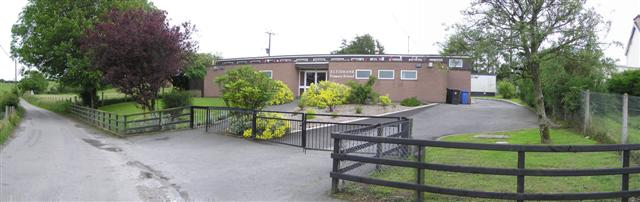
Altishane Primary School

Altishane or Altishahane (from Irish Allt Inse Uí Chatháin, meaning 'glen of Ó Catháin's islet') is a small settlement and townland in County Tyrone, Northern Ireland. It lies near Strabane, between Plumbridge and Donemana. It is situated in the historic barony of Strabane Lower and the civil parish of Donaghedy and covers an area of 744 acres. There is one primary school, Altishane Primary School.

The population of the townland increased slightly overall during the 19th century:

Year	1841	1851	1861	1871	1881	1891
Population	132	122	115	140	145	138
Houses	22	19	25	25	24	24

== Sport ==
Altishane's local Gaelic Athletic Association football team is called Clann Na nGael.

== See also ==
- List of townlands of County Tyrone
