= Drumbo round tower =

Coordinates: 54°30′59″N 5°57′36″W

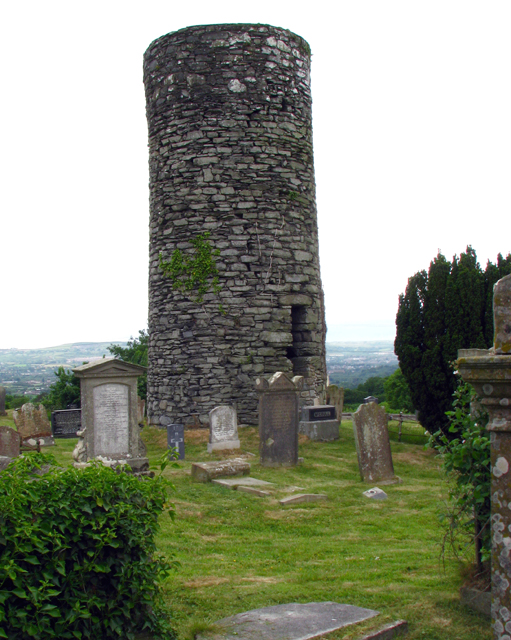
Drumbo round tower

The Drumbo round tower (Irish: Cloigtheach Druim Bó) is a truncated Irish round tower in Drumbo, County Down, Northern Ireland.

== Overview ==
The tower survives to a height of 10.7 metres. It is 5 metres in diameter, with an internal diameter of 2.75 metres. The wall is about 1.2 metres thick. The entrance in the east is 1.5 metres above ground level and is 1.68 metres high and about 0.56 metres wide. Inside there are beam holes indicating that the internal floors were of timber and there are six surviving levels including the basement.

Today the tower lies within the grounds of the local Presbyterian church. Historically the tower was attached to a medieval parish church and monastery, the foundations of which can be seen in the modern day graveyard on the site.

== History ==
The tower dates from around the early medieval period and is a scheduled historic monument. The original structure was severely damaged when the site was plundered by Connor, son of Artgal McLochlin in 1130.

The site of the Drumbo round tower and medieval monastery is one of the oldest religious foundations in Ireland. In the life of Saint Patrick, which is contained in the Book of Armagh, the name Drumbo signifies "the long hill of the cow," which was translated into Collum Bovis, a name by which the ancient church was known. The round tower was originally built here to take advantage of the panoramic views over the Lagan Valley. At the time of the tower's construction, these views would have been useful in spotting incoming Viking raids.

== See also ==
- Irish round tower
