= Broomhedge Maghaberry F.C. =

Association football club in Northern Ireland

Broomhedge Maghaberry
- Full name: Broomhedge Maghaberry Football Club
- Nickname: The Broom
- Founded: 1993
- Ground: Anvil Park
- League: Mid-Ulster Football League Division 3

Broomhedge Maghaberry Football Club is a Northern Irish football club playing in the Division 3 of the Mid-Ulster Football League. Until 2022 Broomhedge was playing in Intermediate B, the 5th level on the pyramid for football in the Northern Ireland. The club was formed as Broomhedge F.C. in 1993 when Moira United and Maghaberry merged. The club changed to its current name in 2016. The club is based in Broomhedge, County Antrim. They are a part of the Mid-Ulster Football Association, and play in the Irish Cup.
