= Straidarran =

Village in County Londonderry, Northern Ireland

Coordinates: 54.897°N 7.091°W

Straidarran: Irish: Sráid Uí Áráin
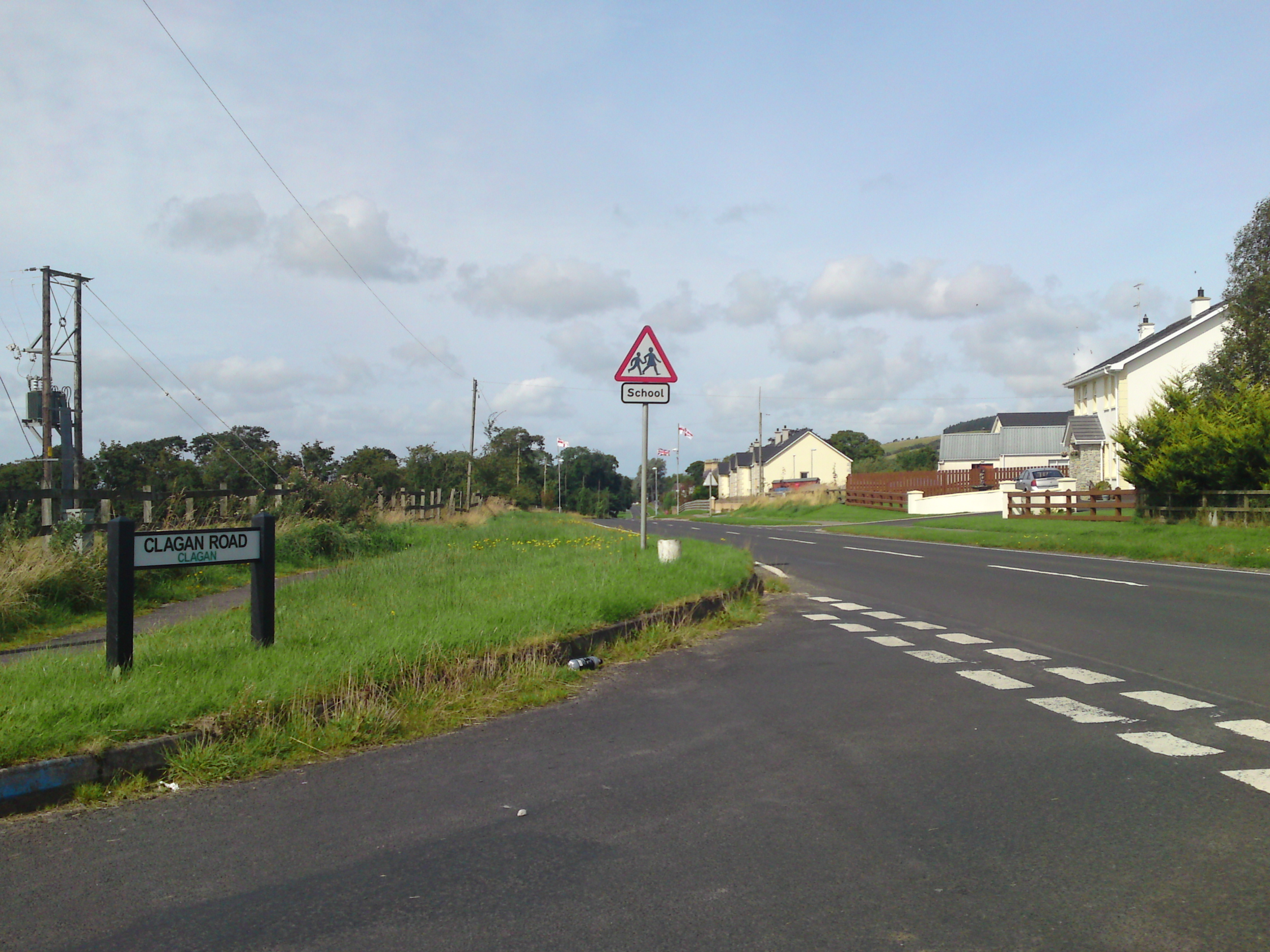
- Clagan Road, Straidarran

- Location within Northern Ireland
- District: Derry City & Strabane District Council
- County: County Londonderry
- Country: Northern Ireland
- Sovereign state: United Kingdom
- Post town: LONDONDERRY
- Postcode district: BT
- Dialling code: 028, +44 28
- Police: Northern Ireland
- Fire: Northern Ireland
- Ambulance: Northern Ireland
- UK Parliament: East Londonderry
- NI Assembly: East Londonderry

Straidarran (from Irish Sráid(bhaile) Uí Áráin, meaning 'street(town) of Ó Haran') is a small village between Feeny and Claudy in County Londonderry, Northern Ireland. In the 2001 Census it had a population of 177. It is within the townlands of Clagan and Killycor, and is situated within Derry City and Strabane District Council district.
