= Drumbo =

Village in County Down, Northern Ireland

Coordinates: 54.516°N 5.959°W

Drumbo: Irish: Druim Bó
- Location within County Down
- Population: 408 (2001 Census)
- District: Lisburn
- County: County Down
- Country: Northern Ireland
- Sovereign state: United Kingdom
- Post town: LISBURN
- Postcode district: BT27
- Dialling code: 028
- Police: Northern Ireland
- Fire: Northern Ireland
- Ambulance: Northern Ireland
- UK Parliament: Lagan Valley
- NI Assembly: Lagan Valley

Drumbo (from Irish Druim Bó, meaning 'ridge of the cow') is a small village, townland and civil parish in County Down, Northern Ireland. It is about 6 miles (10 km) south of Belfast city centre, 3 miles (5 km) east of Lisburn and 3 miles (5 km) west of Carryduff. It is in the historic barony of Castlereagh Upper.

== Demographics ==
The townland has an area of 1,274 acres (516 ha). The 2001 census recorded the village's population as 408.

== Location ==
The village is set on the edge of a ridge where the drumlin country of County Down starts to descend into the Lagan Valley. It is laid out around a junction of routes meeting at the front of the Presbyterian Church, which is a listed building. The current church building is beside the site of the medieval parish church, the foundations of which can be seen in the graveyard, as can the lower half of the truncated Drumbo round tower, a scheduled historic monument. The round tower was originally built here to take advantage of the panoramic views over the Lagan Valley. At the time of the tower's construction, these views would have been useful in spotting oncoming Viking raiders. The tower formed part of a monastery.

The area is designated in the DOE (NI) area development plan as an 'area of outstanding scenic amenity value'. The village lies on the southern edge of the Lagan Valley Area of Outstanding Natural Beauty, while the northern part of the townland lies within it.

A feature in the heart of the village is a wrought iron pump with a distinctive double wheel crank mounted at the junction. This forms the centre of the village adjacent to the Presbyterian church, round tower and village hall. Directly opposite this pump is the building which was for many years the post office for the village. A short distance South of this a blacksmith's foundry operates.

== Sport ==
Lisburn Youth F.C. are an association football club based in Drumbo. They compete in the Mid-Ulster Football League. They are known for their extensive youth academy and have produced professional and international-level footballers, including Aaron Hughes and David Healy.

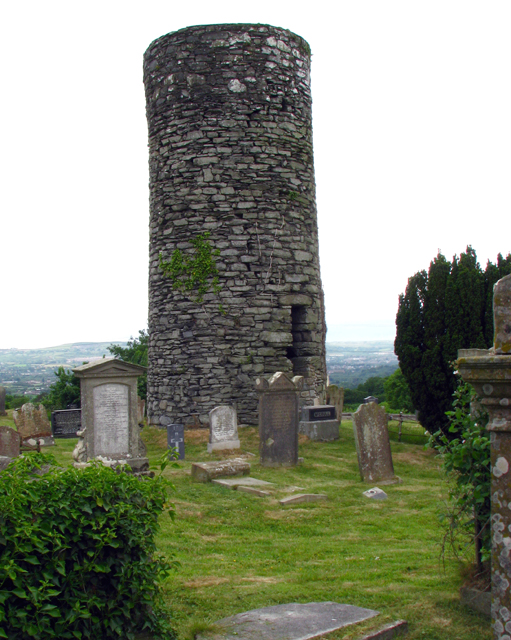
Drumbo round tower

== Civil parish of Drumbo ==
The civil parish includes the urban area of Carryduff.

=== Townlands ===
The civil parish includes the following townlands:

- Ballycarn
- Ballycarngannon
- Ballycowan
- Ballydollaghan
- Ballylesson
- Ballymacbrennan
- Ballynagarrick
- Ballynahatty
- Ballynavally
- Cargacroy
- Carr
- Carryduff
- Clogher
- Clontonakelly
- Creevy
- Crossan
- Drennan
- Drumbo
- Drumra
- Edenderry
- Hillhall
- Knockbreckan
- Legacurry
- Leveroge
- Lisnastrean
- Lisnode
- Mealough
- Tullyard

== See also ==
- List of civil parishes of County Down
- List of townlands in County Down
- Drumbo round tower
