= Legacurry, County Down =

Coordinates: 54.47852°N 6.00266°W

Legacurry: Irish: Lag an Choire
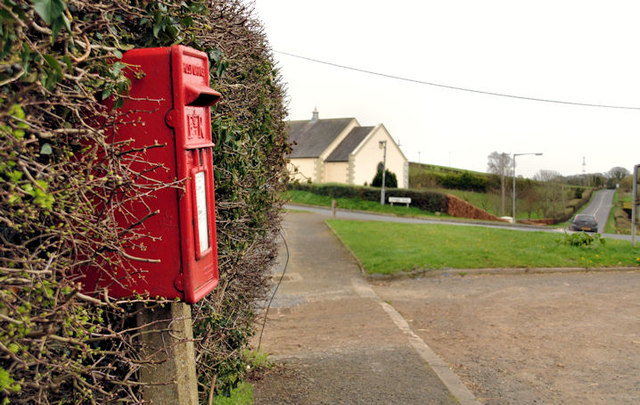
- On Combe Road, Legacurry
- County: County Down
- Country: Northern Ireland
- Sovereign state: United Kingdom
- Postcode district: BT27
- Dialling code: 028

Legacurry (from Irish Lag an Choire, meaning 'hollow of the cauldron') is a townland of 100 acres in County Down, Northern Ireland. It is situated in the civil parish of Drumbo and the historic barony of Castlereagh Upper.

The name may refer to a cauldron-like pool in the Ravernet River which forms the southern boundary of the townland.

Locally significant buildings include Legacurry Presbyterian Church, built in 1848.

== See also ==
- List of townlands in County Down
