= Arney =

Village in County Fermanagh, Northern Ireland

Coordinates: 54.296141°N 7.670259°W

Arney: Irish: An Arna
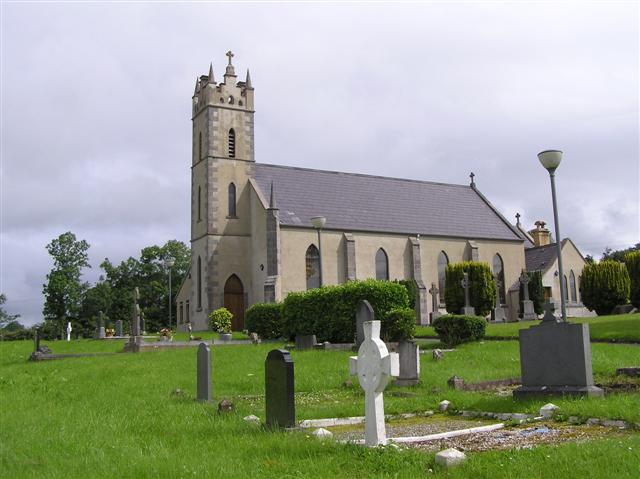
- Arney Catholic church

- Location within Northern Ireland
- Population: 134 (with Skea) (2021 census)
- District: Fermanagh and Omagh
- County: County Fermanagh
- Country: Northern Ireland
- Sovereign state: United Kingdom
- Postcode district: BT
- Dialling code: 028
- UK Parliament: Fermanagh and South Tyrone
- NI Assembly: Fermanagh and South Tyrone

Arney (from Irish An Arna) is a small village in County Fermanagh, Northern Ireland. It lies to the southwest of Enniskillen, between the village of Bellanaleck and the Five Points crossroads. Arney takes its name from the Arney River that feeds Lough Erne. It had a population of 134 people (along with Skea) in the 2021 Census. It is in Fermanagh and Omagh district.

== Transport ==
Ulsterbus route 192 from Swanlinbar to Enniskillen serves Arney twice a day Mondays to Saturdays, providing a commuter link to/from Enniskillen. Leydons Coaches route 930 (Cavan-Ballyconnell-Swanlinbar-Enniskillen) serves Five Points crossroads a few times a day.

The Expressway route 30, which originates in Donegal, serves Bellanaleck which is approximately one and a half miles (2.4 km) away. There is a coach in each direction every two hours during the day as well as an overnight journey. Services operate daily including Sundays.
