= Gortaclare =

Village in County Tyrone, Northern Ireland

Coordinates: 54.524°N 7.211°W

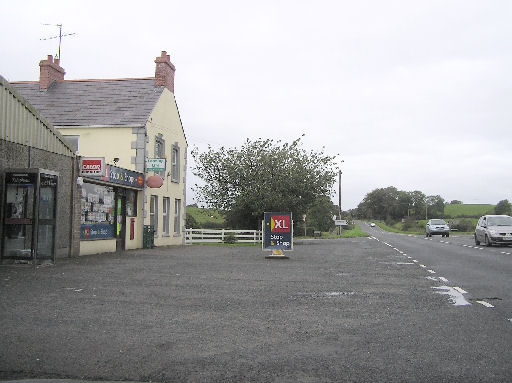
Gortaclare post office (2005)

Gortaclare (from Irish Gort a' Chláir) is a small village and townland in County Tyrone, Northern Ireland. In the 2021 census, it had a population of 76 people (along with Moylagh townland). It lies within the Omagh District Council area.

== See also ==
- List of towns and villages in Northern Ireland
