= Lambeg, County Antrim =

- village, civil parish
- Location within Northern Ireland
- Coordinates: 54.5285°N 6.0270°W
- City: Lisburn and Castlereagh
- Seat: Lagan Valley

Lambeg (historically Lanbeg, from Irish Lann Bheag 'little church') is a small village and civil parish in County Antrim, Northern Ireland. Located between Belfast and Lisburn, it was once a small rural village, but is now within the Greater Belfast conurbation. Lambeg is also an electoral ward of Lisburn Council. In the 2001 Census it had a population of 60 people. The civil parish of Lambeg covers areas of County Down as well as County Antrim.

Lambeg, Ballyskeagh is also home to Lisburn Distillery FC.

== History ==
Lambeg was originally one townland, but was split into Lambeg North (188 acres, in the barony of Belfast Upper) and Lambeg South (187 acres, in the barony of Massereene Upper). The old village of Lambeg was in the northern half.

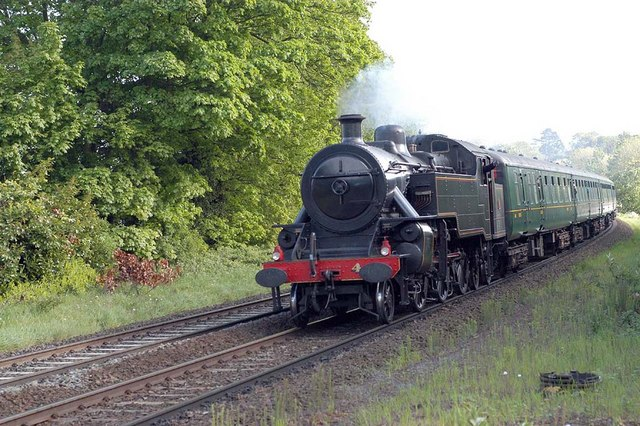
A Railway Preservation Society of Ireland steam train approaching Lambeg railway station.

The River Lagan flows alongside the village and it was because of the river and the damp climate of the Lagan Valley, that flax was first grown there. This resulted in Lambeg becoming a centre for the Linen industry in the area. The fertile land of the Lagan Valley was part of the manor granted in 1611 to Sir Fulke Conway. English tenants, mainly from the north of England according to Rankin, were brought over by Conway to settle on his estate. It is suggested that they also brought experience of textile making with them. The earliest documentary evidence of the textile industry in Lambeg records the setting up of a bleach green in 1626.

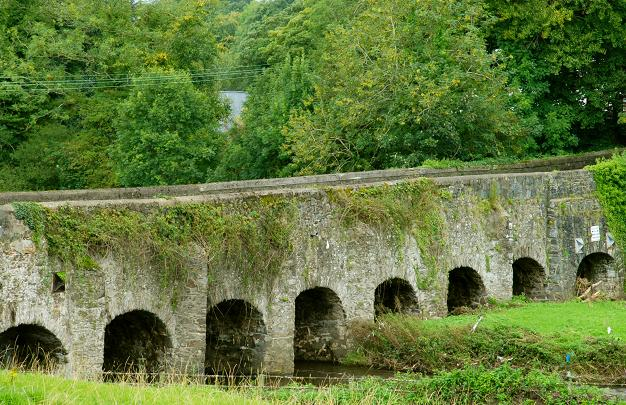
Wolfenden's Bridge.

By 1760, Mr John Williamson owned most of the village and played a prominent role in the development of the linen trade, through ownership of the Lambeg bleach green.

The Wolfendens were a Huguenot family originally from France that fled after facing persecution. They went into exile in Lambeg and assisted in the establishing of the manufacture of linen cloth in the village. The bridge over the River Lagan is still referred to as Wolfenden's Bridge; it is Grade B+ listed, and was most likely built between 1739 and 1759. Earliest evidence of the bridge's creation is a 1739 map by Oliver Sloane showing a bridge in that location. The Wolfenden family is buried in Lambeg graveyard.

Lambeg church itself is generally accepted to be on the site of an early monastic settlement. A church is recorded as being present here in 1598, but it has been rebuilt at least twice, including in 1737 (to which the current tower still dates) and in 1849, when most of the current Church of Ireland building was built. Also buried in the graveyard are the Reverend John Johnson and his wife Dorothea Johnson, who both led the Methodist Chapel that was on Market Street in Lisburn. There are four Catholic priests buried in Lambeg parish church.

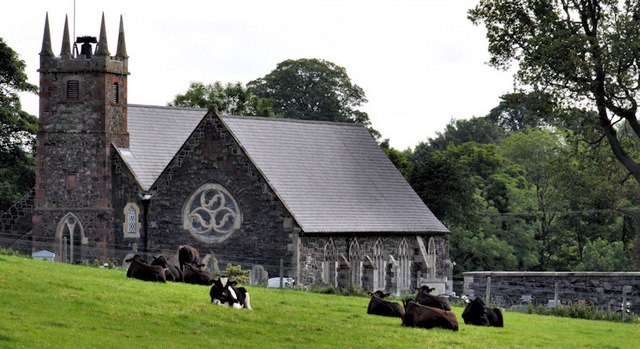
The Lambeg church tower dates to 1737.

Aberdelghy was a mid-19th century two storey house in Lambeg. It was the seat of Alexander Airth Richardson, the son of Jonathan Richardson (MP), of Lambeg, and his wife, Margaret Airth.

Leigh's New Pocket Road-Book of Ireland, published 1827, states:

The rich bleach-greens of Lisburn and of Lambeg, a pleasant village, with a pretty church beyond it on the Belfast side, together with the mansions of opulent linen merchants, here attract attention.

In 1920 the Government of Northern Ireland set up a "Linen Industry Research Association" (LIRA) in Glenmore House, a 17-18th century manor house, for the scientific and technical research of textiles, especially linen. Due to the decline of the industry the centre closed in 1993, although its library of books and journals are now housed in the Lisburn Museum. Glenmore House has been converted into residential apartments.

Other locally significant buildings include Lambeg Old National School (1849), which is now converted to a dwelling and is a listed building.

The Lambeg drum is named after Lambeg.

== Transport ==
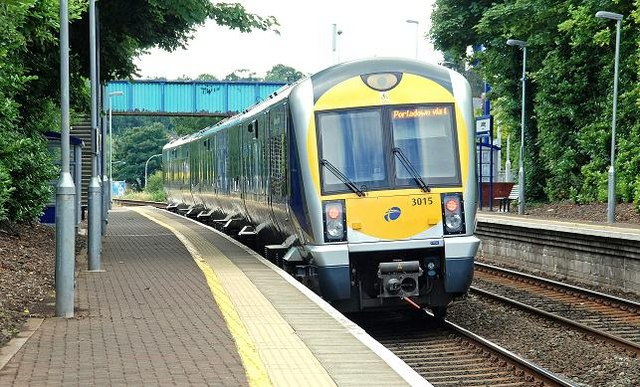
The Portadown train at Lambeg railway station.

- Lambeg railway station opened on 1 September 1877.

== Civil parish of Lambeg ==
The civil parish covers areas of both County Down and County Antrim. It lies in the historic baronies of Castlereagh Upper (3 townlands) in County Down and Belfast Upper (1 townland) and Massereene Upper (1 townland) in County Antrim. It contains the villages of Lambeg and Tullynacross.

=== Townlands ===
- Ballyskeagh
- Lambeg North
- Lambeg South
- Lisnatrunk
- Tullynacross

== See also ==
- List of civil parishes of County Antrim
- List of civil parishes of County Down
