= The Shamrock Tenors =

All-male vocal group from Northern Ireland

The Shamrocks
- Also known as: The Shamrocks
- Origin: Northern Ireland
- Genres: Irish, folk
- Years active: 2018–present
- Members: Raymond Walsh; Jack Walsh; Jimmy Johnston; Matthew Campbell; Nathan Johnston
- Website: theshamrocks.ie

The Shamrocks (formerly the Shamrock Tenors) are a male quintet and band from Northern Ireland. Belfast native Raymond Walsh created the group in 2018. He was a musical theatre actor best known for playing Grantaire in the West End production of Les Misérables in most of its productions including the concert film. The group consists of Raymond Walsh, his brother Jack Walsh, Jimmy Johnston from Larne in County Antrim, his brother Nathan Johnston, and Matthew Campbell. In early 2025 the group received two regional Emmy Awards, one for Best Entertainment and another for Best Audio, from the Michigan Chapter of the National Academy of Television Arts and Sciences, for the PBS show The Shamrock Tenors - Live From Belfast. They also received a nomination for a Royal Television Society Award for their BBC 2 airing of the concert.

They call themselves "cross-community" singers, based on the political term "cross-community vote," because, in the words of founder Walsh, "some of the lads come from a unionist background, some from a nationalist background, so we do our best to essentially present Irish folk music without any of the other nonsense that sometimes comes with it." Their performances, which have been in global venues including at the Kennedy Center, the Sydney Opera House, London's West End, the BBC, and on PBS, have had the goal of promoting a modern Ireland, since all of the singers grew up after The Troubles, and only learned about that time from their parents' and grandparents' generations. Matthew Campbell said that a generation ago this would not have been possible in Northern Ireland: "Catholics and Protestants couldn't stand on the stage together and sing those sort of songs. And now we’re all here in the same room, with audiences from every demographic, all singing together, clapping along together, having a laugh together."
