= Moylagh, County Tyrone =

Townland in County Tyrone, Northern Ireland

Coordinates: 54°31′25″N 7°13′08″W

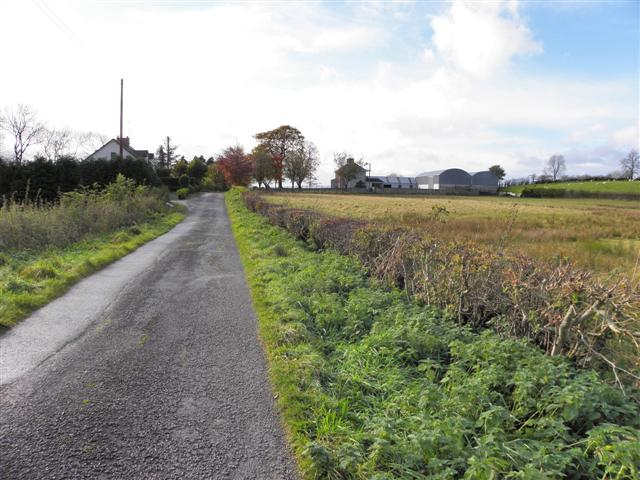
Drumconnelly Road traversing Moylagh townland

Moylagh (from Irish Maolach) is a townland near Gortaclare village in County Tyrone, Northern Ireland. In the 2001 census, it had a population of 66 people (along with Gortaclare). It lies within the Omagh District Council area.
