= Skea, County Fermanagh =

Village in County Fermanagh, Northern Ireland

Coordinates: 54.293862°N 7.66983°W

Skea (from Irish Sceach, meaning 'thorn-bush') is a small village and townland in County Fermanagh, Northern Ireland. The village had a population of 134 people (along with Arney) in the 2021 census. It lies within the Fermanagh and Omagh District Council area.
