= Glenelly Valley =

Valley in Northern Ireland

Coordinates: 54.774°N 7.085°W

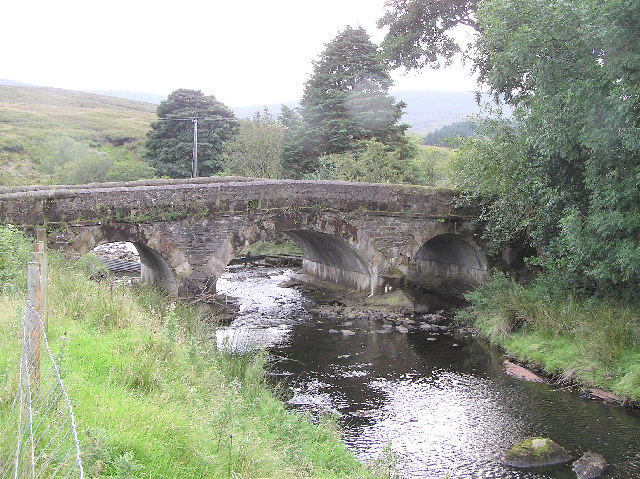
Goles bridge in the Glenelly Valley.

Glenelly Valley or simply Glenelly (from the Irish: Gleann Eallaigh, meaning the valley of the cattle (a sheltered place where cattle were grazed)), is the longest valley in the Sperrin Mountains in County Tyrone, Northern Ireland. It lies within the Sperrin Area of Outstanding Natural Beauty (AONB) and is also in an Environmentally Sensitive Area (ESA).

In the year 858AD, Aed Finnliath mac Néill, king of Ailech, heavily defeated a large Viking army inland at Glenn Foichle (Glenelly, in the barony of Upper Strabane). They may have come from Lough Neagh and the Bann.

== Irish Language ==
Glenelly was home to some of the last native Irish speakers in County Tyrone. The dialect was studied by Gearóid Stockman and Heinrich Wagner who noted that "Glenelly Irish is closer to Donegal Irish than the other Tyrone dialects". Their findings were published in Lochlann, volume 3, in 1965.
