= Halfpenny Gate =

Village in County Antrim, Northern Ireland

Coordinates: 54.488°N 6.162°W

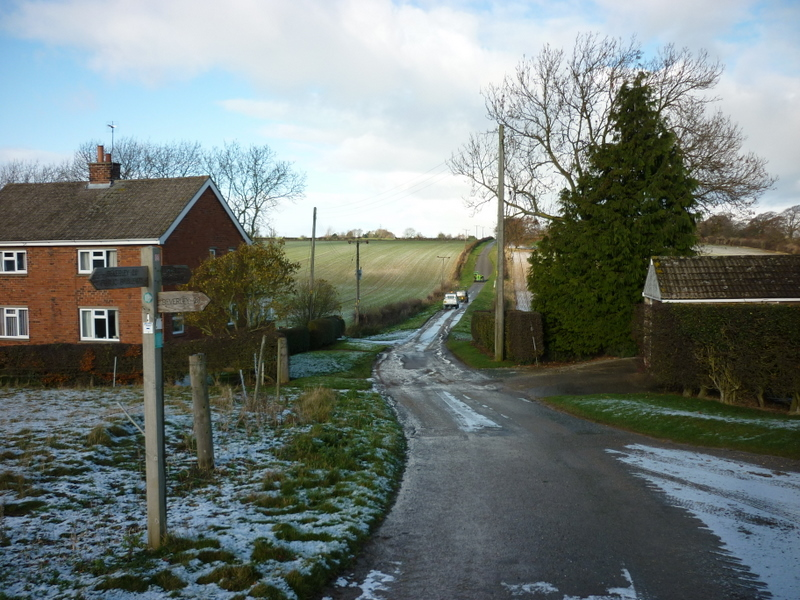
Halfpenny Gate Cottages

Halfpenny Gate is a small village in southern County Antrim, Northern Ireland. It is within the townland of Creenagh (from Irish Críonach 'withered-wood'), between Moira, Maghaberry and Lurganure. In the 2001 Census it had a population of 60 people. It is in the Lisburn and Castlereagh City Council area.

Locally significant buildings include an Orange Hall built in 1910.

== See also ==
- List of towns and villages in Northern Ireland
