= Tullynacross =

Village in County Antrim, Northern Ireland

Coordinates: 54.522145°N 6.013952°W

Tullynacross: Irish: Tulaigh na Croise
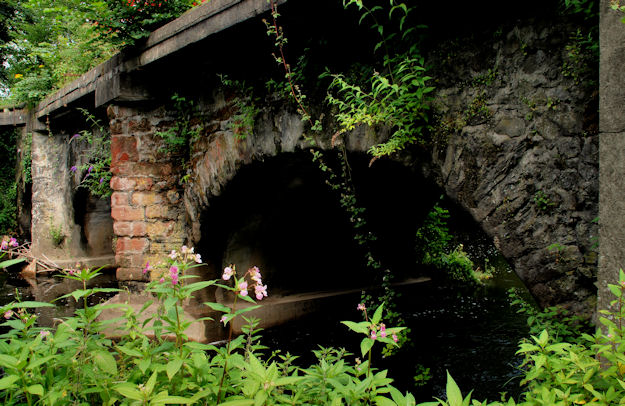
- Lambeg Bridge connects Tullynacross to Lambeg across the River Lagan.

- Location within Northern Ireland
- Population: 159 (2001 Census)
- District: Lisburn and Castlereagh
- County: County Antrim
- Country: Northern Ireland
- Sovereign state: United Kingdom
- Post town: LISBURN
- Postcode district: BT27
- Dialling code: 028
- UK Parliament: Lagan Valley
- NI Assembly: Lagan Valley

Tullynacross (from Irish Tulaigh na Croise, meaning 'hillock of the cross') is a small village in Lisburn, County Antrim, Northern Ireland, near Lambeg. In the 2001 Census it had a population of 159 people.

It lies within the civil parish of Lambeg, the barony of Castlereagh Upper, and is situated within the Lagan Valley Regional Park. The local authority is Lisburn and Castlereagh City Council.

== Economy ==
A major Coca-Cola owned bottling plant is sited in Tullynacross. The Deep RiverRock brand of water is bottled there. The plant is adjacent to a lock on the Lagan Canal (also known as the Lagan Navigation).

== See also ==
- List of villages in Northern Ireland
- List of towns in Northern Ireland
