= Plumbridge =

Village in County Tyrone, Northern Ireland

Coordinates: 54.768°N 7.251°W

Plumbridge: Irish: Droichead an Phlum; Scots: Plumbrig
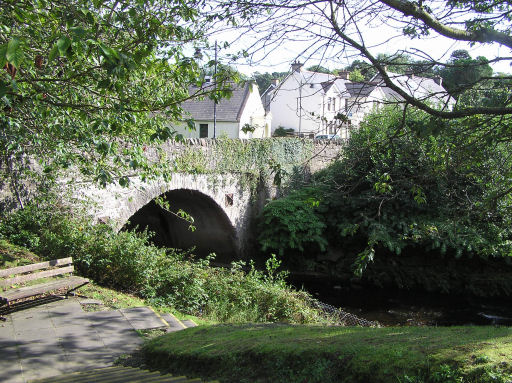
- Bridge over the Glenelly River, Plumbridge

- Location within Northern Ireland
- Population: 267 (2001 Census)
- District: Derry City and Strabane
- County: County Tyrone
- Country: Northern Ireland
- Sovereign state: United Kingdom
- Postcode district: BT
- Dialling code: 028
- Police: Northern Ireland
- Fire: Northern Ireland
- Ambulance: Northern Ireland
- UK Parliament: West Tyrone
- NI Assembly: West Tyrone

Plumbridge is a small village in County Tyrone, Northern Ireland. It is a crossroads village, standing on the banks of the Glenelly River, 16 miles (26 km) south of Derry. In the 2001 census it had a population of 267 people. It lies within Derry City and Strabane District area.

Most of the village is on the northern bank of the Glenelly River, within the townland of Glencoppogagh. However, some of it lies on the southern bank, within the townland of Lisnacreaght.

== Religion ==
The Roman Catholic church is Sacred Heart Church, a Grade B2 listed building, and the Presbyterian church is Glenelly Presbyterian Church, Plumbridge. The village's nearest Church of Ireland church is Upper Badoney Parish Church, a few miles up the Glenelly valley.

== Sport ==
The local Gaelic Athletic Association club, Glenelly St. Joseph's, was established in 1891. There are ladies' teams and men's teams. It is commonly referred to as Glenelly. In 2015 Glenelly Ladies senior football team won the Tyrone and Ulster Intermediate Championships. The village had applied for membership of the National Ski Club Ireland in 2012 but had faced opposition from critics who argue "there is no snow".

== History ==
Among the notable people that have come from Plumbridge are James MacCullagh 1809–1847, mathematician at Trinity College, Dublin (TCD); his brother John MacCullagh, lawyer of Trinity College Dublin; American frontiersman Robert Campbell; Minnesota legislator Robert Campbell Dunn; and Peter McCullagh, a statistician at the University of Chicago.

== See also ==
- List of towns and villages in Northern Ireland
