= List of townlands of County Armagh =

In Ireland, counties are divided into Civil Parishes and Parishes are further divided into townlands. The following is a list of townlands in County Armagh, Northern Ireland:

== A ==
Abbey Park, Acton, Aghacommon, Aghadavoyle, Aghamoat, Aghanergill or Corglass, Aghanore, Aghantaraghan, Aghavilly, Aghayalloge, Aghincurk, Aghinlig, Aghmakane, Aghnacloy, Aghory, Allistragh, Altaturk, Altnamackan, Altnaveigh, Annaboe, Annaclare, Annaclarey, Annacloghmullin, Annacramph, Annagh, Annaghananny, Annagharap, Annaghboy or Rosebrook, Annaghgad, Annaghmacmanus, Annaghmare, Annaghmore, Annagora, Annahagh, Annahaia, Annahugh, Annakeera, Annaloist, Annamoy, Annareagh, Annasamry, Ardgonnell, Ardmore, Ardrea, Ardress East, Ardress West, Armaghbreague, Artabrackagh, Artasooly, Aughadanove, Aughanduff, Aughantarragh and Corr, Aughlish, Aughnacloy, Aughnagurgan, Aughrafin

== B ==
Ballaghy, Ballard, Balleer, Ballenan, Ballinatate, Ballindarragh, Ballinlare, Ballinliss, Ballintaggart, Ballintemple, Ballyanny, Ballyards, Ballyargan, Ballyblagh, Ballybrannan, Ballybreagh, Ballybrocky, Ballybrolly, Ballycoffey or Ballyhoy, Ballycrummy, Ballydogherty, Ballydonaghy, Ballydoo, Ballyfodrin, Ballygargan, Ballygasey, Ballygassoon, Ballygorman, Ballygroobany, Ballyhagan, Ballyhannon, Ballyheridan, Ballykeel, Ballyknick, Ballyknock, Ballylane, Ballyleny, Ballylisk, Ballyloughan, Ballymacanab, Ballymacawley, Ballymacdermot, Ballymackilmurry, Ballymacrandal, Ballymacully Upper, Ballymagerny, Ballymakeown, Ballymartrim Otra, Ballymoran, Ballymore, Ballynacarry, Ballynaclosha, Ballynacor, Ballynagalliagh, Ballynaghy, Ballynagolan, Ballynagowan, Ballynagreagh, Ballynahinch, Ballynahone Beg, Ballynahone More, Ballynalack, Ballynaleck, Ballynameta or Wood Park, Ballynamony, Ballynarea, Ballynarry, Ballynery, Ballynewry, Ballyoran, Ballyrath, Ballyrea, Ballyreagh, Ballyscandal, Ballysheil Beg, Ballysheil More, Ballytroddan, Ballytrue, Ballytyrone, Ballyvally, Ballywilly, Ballyworkan, Baltarran, Balteagh, Baltylum, Belleek, Blackwatertown or Lisbofin, Bocombra, Boconnell, Bolton, Bondville or Tullybrick Etra, Borough of Charlemont, Bottlehill, Brackagh, Brackly, Bracknagh, Brannock, Breagh, Breaghy, Brootally, Broughan, Brughas, Bryandrum

== C ==
Cabragh, Calone, Camagh, Camly (Ball), Camly (Macullagh), Canary, Canoneill, Cappagh, Cargaclogher, Cargagh, Cargalisgorran, Carganamuck, Cargans, Carn, Carnacally, Carnagat, Carnally, Carnavanaghan, Carnbane, Carran, Carrick, Carrickabolie, Carrickacullion, Carrickaldreen, Carrickaloughran, Carrickamone, Carrickananny, Carrickaness, Carrickastickan, Carrickbrack, Carrickbrackan, Carrickbroad, Carrickcloghan, Carrickcroppan, Carrickduff, Carrickgallogly, Carricklane, Carricknagalliagh, Carricknagavna, Carrickrovaddy, Carricktroddan, Carrigans, Carrive, Carrivekenny, Carrivemaclone, Carrowmannan, Carrowmoney, Carryhugh, Cashel, Castleraw, Causanagh, Cavan, Cavanacaw, Cavanagarvan, Cavanagrow, Cavanakill, Cavanapole, Cavanballaghy, Cavandoogan, Charlemont, Borough of, Clady Beg, Clady More, Clankilvoragh, Clanrolla, Claranagh, Clarbane, Clare, Clarkill, Clay, Cloghan, Clogharevan, Cloghfin, Cloghinny, Cloghoge, Cloghreagh, Clonakle, Clonalig, Clonamola, Cloncarrish, Cloncore, Clonlum, Clonmacash, Clonmain, Clonmakate, Clonmartin, Clonmore, Clonroot, Clontycarty, Clontyclay, Clontygora, Clontylew, Cloven Eden, Clownagh, Coharra, College Hall or Marrassit, Coney Flat Island, Coney Island, Cooey, Coolderry, Coolkill, Coolmillish, Coolyhill, Copney, Coragh, Corbracky, Corcrain, Corcreevy, Corcrum, Corcullentragh More, Cordrain, Cordrummond, Corernagh, Corfehan, Corglass or Aghanergill, Corhammock, Corkley, Corlat, Corliss, Corlust, Cornacrew, Cornagrally, Cornahove, Cornakinnegar, Cornalack, Cornamucklagh, Cornascreeb, Cornoonagh, Corr and Aughantarragh, Corr and Dunavally, Corran, Corrinare, Corrinshigo, Corrinure, Corry, Cortamlat, Cor Tynan, Cranagill, Crann, Creaghan, Crearum or Fellow's Hall, Creenagh, Creenkill, Creeve, Creevekeeran, Creeveroe, Creggan Bane Glebe, Creggan Duff, Creggan Lower, Crew Beg, Crewcat, Crew More, Croaghan Island, Cronkill, Cross, Crossbane, Crossdall, Crossdened, Crossmacahilly, Crossmaglen, Crossmore, Crossnamoyle, Crossnenagh, Crossreagh or Doohat, Crunagh, Crunaght, Culkeeran, Cullaville, Cullentragh, Cullyhanna Big, Cushenny

== D ==
Damoily, Darkley, Darton, Demesne, Demesne or Parkmore, Demoan, Derlett, Dernalea, Dernasigh, Derrinraw, Derry, Derryadd, Derryall, Derryallen, Derryane, Derryanvil, Derryaugh, Derry Beg, Derrybrughas, Derrycaw, Derrycoose, Derrycor, Derrycorry North, Derrycory, Derrycrew, Derrycughan, Derrydorragh, Derryhale, Derryhaw, Derryhennet, Derryhirk, Derryhubbert North, Derryinver, Derrykeeran, Derrykeevan, Derrykerran, Derrylard, Derrylee, Derrylettiff, Derrylileagh, Derrylisnahavil, Derryloste, Derryloughan, Derrymacash, Derrymacfall, Derrymagowan, Derrymattry, Derry More, Derrynaught, Derryneskan, Derryraine, Derryscollop, Derrytagh North, Derrytrasna, Derryvane, Derryvore, Derrywilligan, Dillay, Dinnahorra, Diviny, Doctor's Quarter, Donagreagh, Doogary, Doohat or Crossreagh, Dorsey, Dorsey (Hearty), Dougher, Downs or Drumarg, Dressogagh, Dromintee, Drum, Drumacanver, Drumachee, Drumahean, Drumalane, Drumalaragh, Drumalis, Drumaltnamuck, Drumanphy, Drumard (Jones), Drumard (Primate), Drumarg or Downs, Drumarn, Drumart, Drumask or Ballycullen, Drumatee, Drumbally, Drumbanagher, Drumbee, Drumbee Beg, Drumbeecross, Drumboy, Drumcarn, Drumconwell, Drumcoote, Drumcree, Drumcrow, Drumcullen, Drumderg, Drumduff, Drumennis, Drumfergus, Drumgane, Drumgar, Drumgarran, Drumgask, Drumgaw, Drumgolliff, Drumgoose, Drumgor, Drumgose, Drumgreenagh, Drumharriff, Drumherney, Drumhillery, Drumhirk, Drumilly, Druminallyduff, Druminargal, Druminure, Drumlack, Drumlellum, Drumlisnagrilly, Drumlougher, Drumman, Drumman Beg, Drummannon, Drummeland, Drummenagh, Drummilt, Drummond, Drummuck, Drummuckavall, Drumnacanvy, Drumnaglontagh, Drumnagloy, Drumnagoon, Drumnahavil, Drumnahoney, Drumnahunshin, Drumnakelly, Drumnaleg, Drumnamether, Drumnamoe, Drumnasoo, Drumnevan, Drumnykerne, Drumogher, Drumorgan, Drumrusk, Drumsallan Lower, Drumsavage, Drumshallan, Drumsill, Duburren, Dunavally and Corr, Dundrum, Dunesmullan, Dunlarg, Duvernagh

== E ==
Eagralougher, Edenappa, Edenaveys, Edenderry, Edenykennedy, Edenknappagh, Eglish, Ellisholding, Elm Park or Mullaghatinny, Enagh, Ennislare, Eshwary

== F ==
Fairview or Mucklagh, Farmacaffly, Farnaloy, Farra, Farranamucklagh, Fathom Lower, Federnagh, Fellows Hall or Crearum, Fergort, Fernagreevagh, Finiskin, Foley, Foughill Etra, Foughill Otra, Foyarr, Foy Beg, Foyduff, Freeduff

== G ==
Gallrock, Garvagh, Garvaghy, Glasdrumman, Glasdrummanaghy, Glasdrummond, Glebe, Goragh, Gortmalegg, Gosford Demesne, Granemore, Grange Blundel, Grange Lower, Grangemore, Grange Upper, Greenan, Greyhillan

== H ==
Hacknahay, Hamiltonsbawn, Hanslough

== I ==
Iskymeadow, Island Spa

== J ==
Johnstown

== K ==
Keady Beg, Keenaghan, Keggall, Kennedies, Kernan, Kilbracks, Kilcam, Kilcarn, Kilcon, Kilcreevy Etra, Killaghy, Killeen, Killuney, Killybodagh, Killycapple, Killycarn Lower, Killycomain, Killyfaddy, Killylea, Killylyn, Killymaddy, Killynure, Killyquin, Killyreavy, Killyruddan, Kilmacanty, Kilmachugh, Kilmagamish, Kilmatroy, Kilmonaghan, Kilmore, Kilmoriarty, Kilrea, Kiltubbrid, Kiltybane or Lisleitrim, Kilvergan, Kincon, Kingarve, Kinnegoe, Kishaboy, Knappagh, Knock, Knockaconey, Knockagraffy, Knockaneagh, Knockavannon, Knockbane, Knockduff, Knockmenagh, Knocknamuckly, Knocknashane, Knockramer, Knockrevan

== L ==
Lagan, Laraghshankill, Latbirget, Latmacollum, Latt, Lattery, Legacorry or Rich Hill, Legaghory, Legagilly or Tyross, Leganny, Legarhill, Legavilly, Legmoylin, Lemnagore, Lenalea, Lesh, Levaghery, Levalleglish, Levallymore, Lisadian, Lisamry, Lisavague, Lisbane, Lisbanoe, Lisbofin or Blackwatertown, Liscalgat, Liscorran, Lisdonwilly, Lisdown, Lisdrumard, Lisdrumbrughas, Lisdrumchor Lower, Lisdrumgullion, Lisdrumliska, Lisglynn, Liskyborough, Lislasly, Lislea, Lisleitrim or Kiltybane, Lisloony, Lisnadill, Lisnafeedy, Lisnagat, Lisnagree, Lisnakea, Lisnalee, Lisnamintry, Lisneany, Lisnisk, Lisnisky, Lisraw, Lissagally, Lissaraw, Lissheagh or Mount Irwin, Lissheffield, Lisslanly, Lissummon, Listarkelt, Longfield, Longstone, Loughgall, Loughross, Lurgaboy, Lurgan, Lurgana, Lurgancot, Lurgancullenboy, Lurgantarry, Lurgyross, Lurgyvallen, Lylo

== M ==
Macantrim, Maddan, Magaraty, Magherarville, Maghernahely, Maghery, Magherydogherty, Maghery Kilcrany, Maghnavery, Maghon, Manooney, Maphoner, Marlacoo Beg, Marrassit or College Hall, Mavemacullen, Maydown, Maynooth, Maytone, Maytown, Meigh, Middletown, Monaguillagh, Monbrief, Monclone, Money, Moneycree, Moneypatrick, Moneyquin, Monog, Moodoge, Mounthill, Mount Irwin or Lissheagh, Mountnorris, Mowillin, Moybane, Moyraverty, Moyrourkan, Muckery, Mucklagh or Fairview, Mulladry, Mullaghatinny or Elm Park, Mullaghbane, Mullaghbrack, Mullaghduff, Mullaghglass, Mullaghmore, Mullahead, Mullalelish, Mullaletragh, Mullan, Mullanary, Mullanasilla, Mullantine, Mullantur, Mullavilly, Mullenakill South, Mullurg, Mullyard, Mullyleggan, Mullyloughan, Mullyloughran

== N ==
Naul, Navan, Newtown

== O ==
Outlack, Outleckan

== P ==
Parkmore or Demesne, Phil Roe's Flat, Pollnagh, Portnelligan

== R ==
Racarbry, Ratarnet, Rathconvil, Rathcumber, Rathdrumgran, Rathkeelan, Rathtrillick, Rawes, Reedy Flat, Reen, Rich Hill or Legacorry, Richmount or Aghavellan, Rockmacreeny, Rocks, Rosebrook, Roughan, Rowan, Roxborough

== S ==
Salters Grange, Seaboughan, Seafin, Seagahan, Seagoe Lower, Seagoe Upper, Selshion, Serse, Shanecrackan Beg, Shaneglish, Shankill, Shanmullagh or Ballycullen, Shanroe, Shantally, Shean, Sheetrim, Sheiland, Shewis, Silverwood, County Armagh, Silverwood, Skegatillida, Skerries, Skerriff (Tichburn), Skerriff (Trueman), Slieve Gullion, Spa Island, Sturgan

== T ==
Taghnevan, Tamlaght, Tamnaficarbet, Tamnafiglassan, Tamnaghbane, Tamnaghmore, Tamnaghvelton, Tandragee, Tannaghmore, Tannaghmore North, Tannaghmore South, Tannaghmore West, Tannyoky, Tarsan, Tarthlogue, Tassagh, Tavanagh, Teagy, Teemore, Teer, Teeraw, Teer Island, Terraskane, Terryhoogan, Tievecrom, Tievenamara, Timakeel, Timulkenny, Tireagerty, Tirearly, Tirgarriff, Tirgarve, Tirmacrannon, Tirnascobe, Tirsogue, Tivernacree, Toberhewny, Tonnagh, Tray, Tullyah, Tullyallen, Tullyargle, Tullybrick Etra or Bondville, Tullybrick (Hamilton), Tullybrone, Tullycallidy, Tullydagan, Tullydonnell (Gage), Tullygally, Tullyglush (Kane), Tullyglush (Nevin), Tullyherron, Tullyhirm, Tullyhugh, Tullykevan, Tullylinn, Tullylost, Tullymacann, Tullymore, Tullynacross, Tullynagin, Tullynavall, Tullyogallaghan, Tullyroan, Tullyronnelly, Tullysaran, Tullyvallan, Tullyvallan Hamilton East, Tullyvallan Tipping East, Tullyvallan Tipping West, Tullywinny, Tullyworgle, Turcarra, Turry, Tynan, Tyross or Legagilly

== U ==
Umgola, Ummerinvore, Unshog

== W ==
Wood Park

== See also ==
- List of civil parishes of County Armagh
