= Fews Lower =

Fews Lower Na Feá Íochtaracha(Irish)
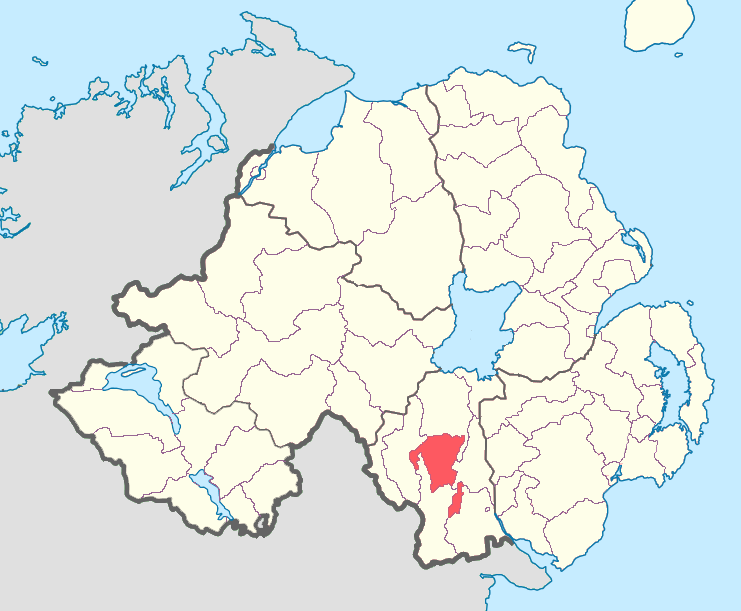
- Location of Fews Lower, County Armagh, Northern Ireland.
- Sovereign state: United Kingdom
- Country: Northern Ireland
- County: Armagh

Fews Lower (from Irish na Feá/Feadha, meaning 'the woods') is a barony in County Armagh, Northern Ireland. Its lies in the center of the county, with an enclave lying just to the south-east. The main portion is bordered by four other baronies: Armagh to the west; Oneilland West to the north; Orior Lower to the east; and Fews Upper to the south. Fews Upper and Orior Lower also border the enclave to its north and west, with Orior Upper to its south-west. The Fews Mountains run through both Fews Lower and Upper, the highest peak of which in Fews Lower is, Deadman's Hill, which stands at 1,178 ft (359 m). Fews Lower and Upper formed the barony of The Fews until it was subdivided.

== List of settlements ==
Below is a list of settlements in Fews Lower:

=== Towns ===
- Markethill

=== Villages and population centres ===
- Cladymore
- Glenanne
- Hamiltonsbawn
- Loughgilly (also part in the baronies of Orior Lower and Upper)
- Mowhan

== List of civil parishes ==
Below is a list of civil parishes in Fews Lower:

- Kilclooney (split with barony Orior Lower)
- Kildarton (split with Oneilland West)
- Lisnadill (split with the baronies of Armagh and Fews Upper)
- Loughgilly (split with barony of Orior Lower and Orior Upper, it also contains the enclave)
- Mullaghbrack (split with barony of Oneilland West)
