= Ardress, County Armagh =

Coordinates: 54°26′43″N 6°35′45″W

Ardress: Irish: Ardriasc
- Location within Northern Ireland
- Population: 90
- Irish grid reference: H 90875 55840
  - Belfast: 28 mi (45 km)
  - Dublin: 76 mi (122 km)
- District: Armagh City, Banbridge and Craigavon
- County: County Armagh
- Country: Northern Ireland
- Sovereign state: United Kingdom
- Post town: CRAIGAVON
- Postcode district: BT62
- Dialling code: 028
- Police: Northern Ireland
- Fire: Northern Ireland
- Ambulance: Northern Ireland
- UK Parliament: Newry and Armagh
- NI Assembly: Newry and Armagh

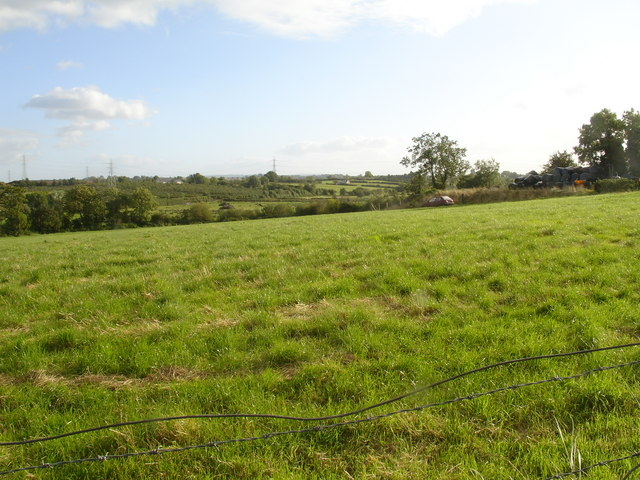
Ardress west fields

Ardress (formerly Ardreske, from Irish Ardriasc, meaning 'height of the marsh') is a hamlet and townland between Loughgall and Annaghmore in County Armagh, Northern Ireland. It is made up of Ardress East and Ardress West. It is within the civil parish of Loughgall and barony of Oneilland West. It had a population of 90 people (39 households) in the 2011 Census.

== See also ==
- List of townlands in County Armagh
