= Tirmacrannon =

Land unit in Northern Ireland

Tirmacrannon: Irish: Tír mic Rannáin
- County: Armagh
- Country: Northern Ireland
- Sovereign state: United Kingdom
- Postcode district: BT61
- Dialling code: 028

Tirmacrannon (from Irish Tír mic Rannáin, meaning 'MacRannon's district') is a townland of 163 acres in County Armagh, Northern Ireland. It is situated in the civil parish of Loughgall and the historic barony of Armagh.

== See also ==
- List of townlands in County Armagh
