= Drumart =

- Townland
- County: Armagh
- Country: Northern Ireland
- Sovereign state: United Kingdom
- Post town: CRAIGAVON
- Postcode district: BT62

Drumart is a townland of approximately 350 acres (0.5 sq mi) in County Armagh, Northern Ireland. It is situated within the civil parish of Mullaghbrack (Oneilland West portion) in the historic barony of Orior Lower.

== See also ==
- List of townlands of County Armagh
