= Clonmain =

Townland (land unit) in Northern Ireland

Clonmain: Irish: Cluain Meadhoin
- County: Armagh
- Country: Northern Ireland
- Sovereign state: United Kingdom
- Postcode district: BT61
- Dialling code: 028

Clonmain, or sometimes Clonmaine (from Irish Cluain Meadhoin, meaning 'lawn of the centre'), is a townland of 380 acres in County Armagh, Northern Ireland. It is situated in the civil parish of Loughgall and the historic barony of Oneilland West. It was visited by John Wesley in 1767.

== See also ==
- List of townlands in County Armagh
