= Oneilland =

Barony in County Armagh, Northern Ireland

Oneilland Uí Nialláin(Irish)
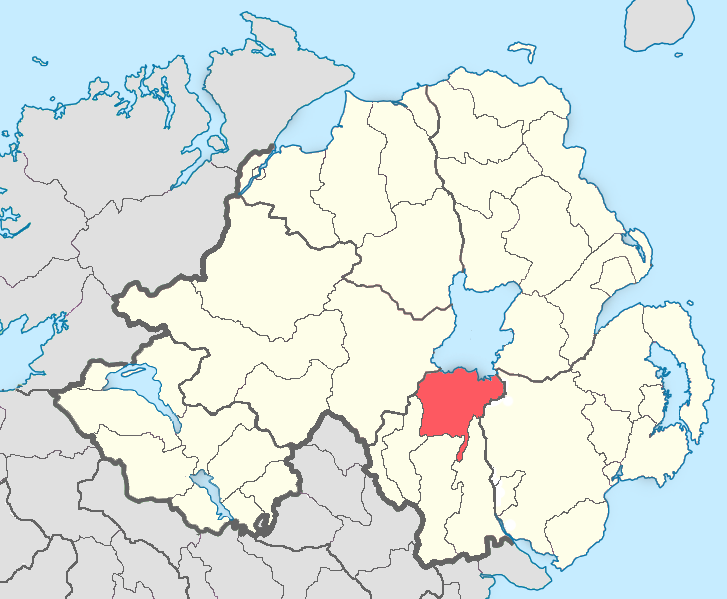
- Location of Oneilland, County Armagh, in present-day Northern Ireland. It was based on the Irish district of Uí Nialláin.
- Sovereign state: United Kingdom
- Country: Northern Ireland
- County: Armagh

Oneilland (from Irish Uí Nialláin, meaning 'descendants of Nialláin') is the name of a former barony in County Armagh, present-day Northern Ireland. It covers the northern area of the county bordering the south-eastern shoreline of Lough Neagh. At some stage the barony was divided into Oneilland East and Oneilland West.

== Territory ==
The barony of Oneilland—also recorded as Oneilan—derives its name from the anglicisation of the ancient Irish district of Uí Nialláin, which was named after the Irish sept of the same name. Its territory however is based upon three such districts: "Oneilan, Clanbrassil, and Clancann". Clanbrassil and Clancann both lay along the southern shoreline of Lough Neagh, with the River Bann forming the boundary between them, with the former on the east side and the latter on the west side. Oneilan lay south of Clancann also west of the river.

== Medieval history ==
The Uí Nialláin were a sept of Clan Cernaich, and they ruled from Loch gCál, modern-day Loughgall. Along with the Uí Bresail and Uí Echdach, they were amongst the main dynasties to arise from the split in the 8th century of Airthir, one of the nine kingdoms of Airgíalla. The land of the Uí Echdach corresponded to the modern barony of Armagh. The land of the Uí Bresail, recorded as "Clanbrassil" in English, as well as that of "Clancann" both lay in the modern barony of Oneilland East along the southern shore of Lough Neagh. The River Bann

The related Ó hAnluain (O'Hanlon) sept were for a couple of centuries chiefs of Oneilland, after which they ruled for several centuries as chiefs of a much reduced Airthir, which by then corresponded to the modern baronies of Orior Lower and Orior Upper, which derive their name from it.

The Ó Gairbhith (O'Garvey) sept, who were kindred with the Ó hAnluain, held sway in Clanbrassil before the Mac Cana (McCann) sept of Clan Cana (Clancann) took over. The Mac Cana would extend Clanbrassil to encompass all of Oneilland and what is now the barony of Dungannon Middle in County Tyrone. Clanbrassil was also recorded as "McCan's Country". The McCanns last residence in suggested as being in an area of land recorded in the plantation map near the shore of Lough Neagh called "Maghery-Greny".

By the 16th century the O'Neills of Tir Eoghain had taken over what was to become the barony of Oneilland. Due to the areas attractiveness it became a favourite retreat for members of the O'Neill family in times of peace and war. As The O'Neill resided at the clan's capital in Dungannon, Oneilland was set apart for his brother or eldest son, who resided in a crannog in Loughgall, which then was a more extensive lough. The O'Neill reserved for himself the right to temporarily stay at this residence.

Thus Oneilland became the territory of Art MacBaron O'Neill, son of Matthew O'Neill, 1st Baron Dungannon, with the area in a map from 1560 called "Art Mac Baron his countree". Art's younger half-brother, Hugh O'Neill, Earl of Tyrone, who eventually became head of the family thus having Dungannon as his residence seemed to favour residing in Loughgall.

== Plantation of Ulster ==
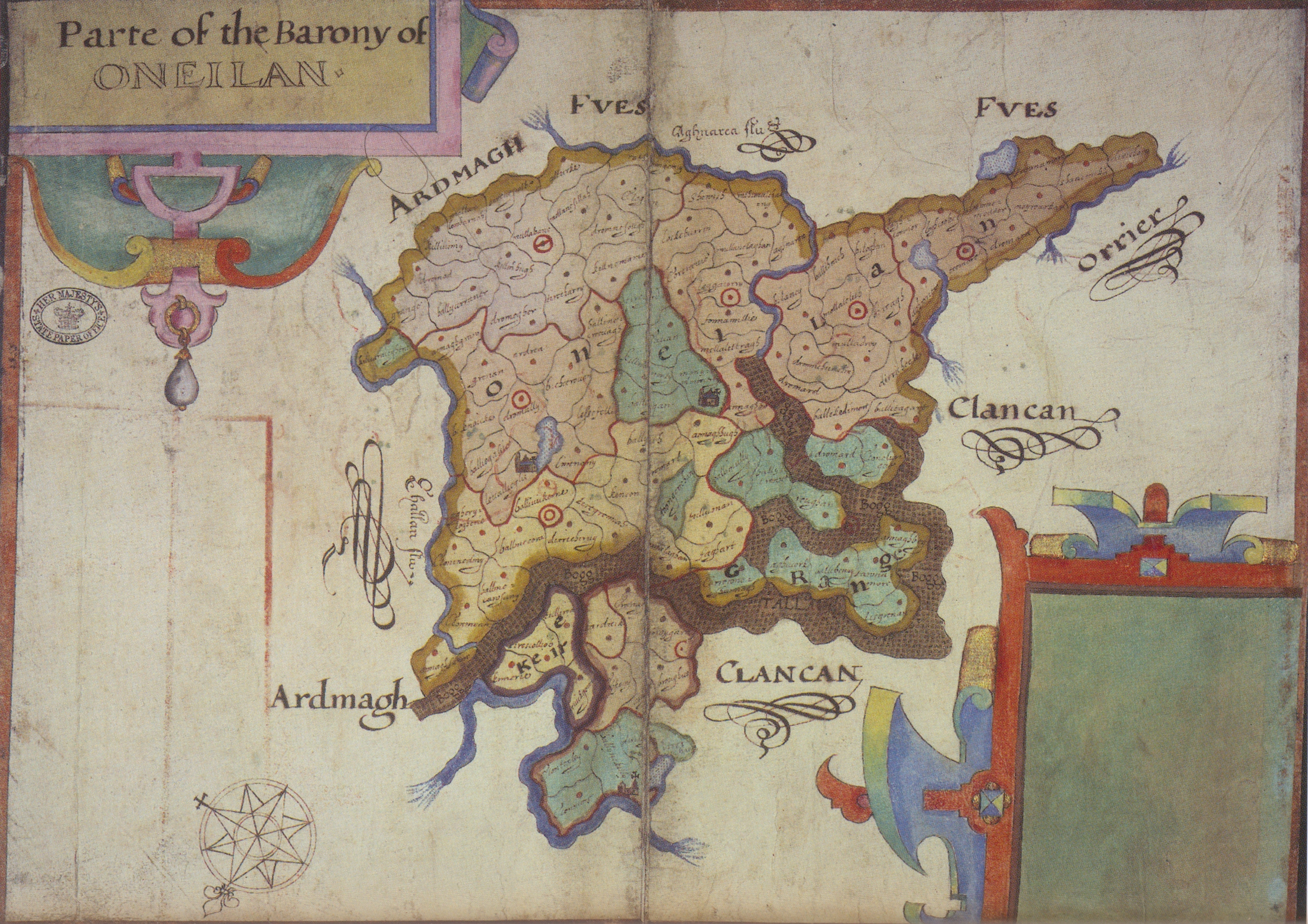
Map of part of the barony of Oneilland in County Armagh as drawn by Josias Bodley during the survey of Ulster in 1609. Detailed are the proportions and townlands within the district of Oneilland portion of the barony. (map not to scale or accurate location)

The boundaries of the Plantation of Ulster precinct of Oneilland were conterminous with the barony. As part of the plantation, it was set aside for English undertakers only and due to the high fertility of the land and its closeness to The Pale it was the most sought after area.

The most notable native to be displaced by the English undertakers was Art MacBaron O'Neill. It was considered desirable by the government at the time to handle Art's removal carefully so that it would happen peacefully and thus inspire his kinsmen in Oneilland to react in kind. The council for the plantation in London decided that it would decide where to dislodge Art to, in which they granted him 2,000 acres in the neigbhbouring barony of Orior. Due to his advanced years Art gave little resistance and upon his peaceful acceptance of his proportion in Orior, saw many of his kinsmen in Oneilland do likewise.

For the purposes of plantation grants, Oneilland was divided into thirteen proportions granted to ten individuals: eight consisting of 1,000 acres; three consisting of 1,500 acres; and two consisting of 2,000 acres. Due to the gratuity of the planners so called waste or unprofitable land were thrown in meaning the undertakers may have ended up with far more land than they were intended to be given. In some cases this "unprofitable" land turned out to at times be more profitable than the arable land.

The English undertakers given the initial grants where:

- Richard Rolleston, a clergyman from Staffordshire, who received the small proportion of Teemore. He however lost his land to his own fellow countryman, Francis Annesley.
- Francis Sacherville from Leicestershire who received two small proportions: Mullalelish and Legagacorry.
- John Brownlowe from Nottingham received the middle proportion of Doughcorron, which corresponded to the northern part of the ancient district of Clanbrassil. He named his residence Brownlowe-Derry, after the townland of Derry that it was built in.
- James Matchett, a clergyman from Trimingham, Norfolk, who received the small proportion of Kerhanan. He was unable to fulfill the conditions of his grant so he gave it to Lord Viscount Grandison and his heirs, and became rector of Kilmore. Matchett would be killed in the first outbreak of violence in the Irish rebellion of 1641. Kerhanan corresponded nearly to the center of Clanbrassil.
- William Powell of Castlespark, Staffordshire, received the great proportion of Ballyworran. An enquiry of the king's stable, he may have received his grant as payment for arrears in salary, and with no intention of leaving his post, Powell sold his grant as soon as he had received it. Ballyworran spanned the southern extremities of Clanbrassil and Clancann.
- John Dillon of Aggardsley Park, Staffordshire, the middle proportion of Mullabane. Dillon was one of the most enthusiastic undertakers in the plantation. His residence was named Castle Dillon.
- William Brownlowe, the son of John Brownlowe, who received the small proportion of Ballynemony, which lay on the southern shore of Lough Neagh. Upon his father's death, he inherited his grant of Doughcorron.
- William Stanhowe of Norwich, Norfolk, who received the middle proportion of Kannagolah. Kannagolah spanned nearly the whole length of the ancient Irish district of Clancann from north to south, and included the possible last residence of the districts McCann chiefs.
- John Heron who received the small proportions of Aghivillan and Broughes, which both formed one manor. Aghivillan lay in Clancann, whilst the majority of Broughes also lies in Clancann, with the rest in Oneilland.
- Sir Anthony Cope of Cope Castle, Kensington, London, who received the great proportion of Dirrichrreny and the small proportion of Dromully, both of which were made one manor. Originally Lord Saye was to take out the patent however Cope bought out his interest. Dirrichrreny and Dromully both lay in the district of Oneilland. His manor contained the town of Loughgall.

In 1611 a report commissioned by the king to inspect the plantations in Ulster was carried out by Sir George Garew, in which Oneilland's progress was the most favourable. Despite this woodkerns—displaced natives—for three years launched raids on the plantation spreading fear and terror. Woodkerns are recorded as attacking from the dense forests of Clancann, Clanbrassil, and Oneilland, and other districts in County Armagh.

== 1608 rebellion ==
In 1608 Eochaidh Óg O'Hanlon, son and heir of Sir Eochaidh O'Hanlon, along with the son of the recently executed son of Brian Mac Art O'Neill of Loughgall, rose up in support of Sir Cahir O'Doherty of Inishowen, County Donegal, who had risen in rebellion against the English. Both Eochaidh Óg and O'Neill felt obliged to support O'Doherty due to family ties, with Eochaidh Og married to Cahir's sister Margaret. Their main opponent was their kinsman Sir Turlough MacHenry O'Neill of the barony of the Fews who captured the two men. The Lord Deputy of Ireland Chichester tried to blame the forests and Eochaidh Og O'Hanlon's rebellion in 1608 for the woodkern, however it was his own policies that was the problem.

== Division of Oneilland ==
When the barony of Oneilland was split into two, the portion east of the River Bann corresponding to the ancient district of Clanbrassil became Oneilland East, whilst the portion west of the river corresponding to the districts of Oneilland and Clancann became Oneilland West. Oneilland East consisted of 34,408 statute acres, whilst Oneilland West consisted of 59,502.
