= Eagralougher =

Eagralougher: Irish: Eagar a lochain
- County: Armagh
- Country: Northern Ireland
- Sovereign state: United Kingdom
- Postcode district: BT61
- Dialling code: 028

Eagralougher (from Irish Eagar a lochain, meaning 'row or rank of the small lough') is a townland of 234 acres in County Armagh, Northern Ireland. It is situated in the civil parish of Loughgall and the historic barony of Oneilland West.

== See also ==
- List of townlands in County Armagh
