= Altaturk =

Coordinates: 54.3498°N 6.5854°W

Altaturk: Irish: Alt a tuirc
- Location within Northern Ireland
- County: Armagh
- Country: Northern Ireland
- Sovereign state: United Kingdom
- Postcode district: BT61
- Dialling code: 028

Altaturk (from Irish Alt a tuirc, meaning 'height or glen of the hog or wild boar') is a townland of 283 acres in County Armagh, Northern Ireland. It is situated in the historic barony of Oneilland West and up until 1851 in the civil parish of Loughgall after which it was transferred to Kildarton civil parish.

== See also ==
- List of townlands in County Armagh
