= Aghinlig =

Coordinates: 54°25′40″N 6°39′47″W

Aghinlig: Irish: Achadh an luig
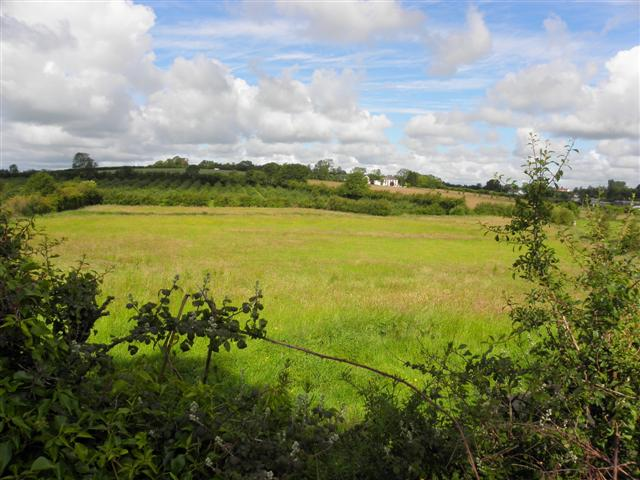
- Aghinlig townland in 2011

- Location within Northern Ireland
- County: Armagh
- Country: Northern Ireland
- Sovereign state: United Kingdom
- Postcode district: BT71
- Dialling code: 028

Aghinlig (from Irish Achadh an luig, meaning 'field of the hollow') is a townland of 509 acres in County Armagh, Northern Ireland. It is situated in the civil parish of Loughgall and the historic barony of Armagh.

== See also ==
- List of townlands in County Armagh
