= Levalleglish =

Coordinates: 54.4121°N 6.6084°W

Levalleglish: Irish: Leath-baile Eaglaise
- County: Armagh
- Country: Northern Ireland
- Sovereign state: United Kingdom
- Postcode district: BT61
- Dialling code: 028

Levalleglish (from Irish Leath-baile Eaglaise, meaning 'half town of the church') is a townland of 222 acres in County Armagh, Northern Ireland. It is situated in the civil parish of Loughgall and the historic barony of Oneilland West.

== See also ==
- List of townlands in County Armagh
