= Rathdrumgran =

Townland (administrative area) in Northern Ireland

Rathdrumgran: Irish: Rath druim gráine
- County: Armagh
- Country: Northern Ireland
- Sovereign state: United Kingdom
- Postcode district: BT61
- Dialling code: 028

Rathdrumgran (from Irish Rath druim gráine, meaning 'Fort of Grania's ridge') is a townland of 185 acres in County Armagh, Northern Ireland. It is situated in the civil parish of Loughgall and the historic barony of Oneilland West.

== See also ==
- List of townlands in County Armagh
