= Mullanasilla =

Townland (administrative area) in Northern Ireland

Mullanasilla: Irish: Mullach na Saileach
- County: Armagh
- Country: Northern Ireland
- Sovereign state: United Kingdom
- Postcode district: BT61
- Dialling code: 028

Mullanasilla (from Irish Mullach na Saileach, meaning 'summit or hill-top of the willow') is a townland of 363 acres in County Armagh, Northern Ireland. It is situated in the civil parish of Loughgall and the historic barony of Oneilland West.

== See also ==
- List of townlands in County Armagh
