= Derrycrew =

Coordinates: 54.433°N 6.598°W

Derrycrew: Irish: Doire craobh
- Location within Northern Ireland
- District: Armagh City, Banbridge and Craigavon
- County: County Armagh
- Country: Northern Ireland
- Sovereign state: United Kingdom
- Post town: ARMAGH
- Postcode district: BT61
- Dialling code: 028
- UK Parliament: Newry and Armagh
- NI Assembly: Newry and Armagh

Derrycrew (from Irish Doire craobh, meaning 'oak of the wide branching trees') is a townland of 444 acres in County Armagh, Northern Ireland. It is situated in the civil parish of Loughgall and the historic barony of Oneilland West.

== See also ==
- List of townlands in County Armagh
