= Ballytyrone =

Coordinates: 54°23′48″N 6°35′38″W

Ballytyrone: Irish: Baile Tíre Eoghain
- Townland
- Location within Northern Ireland
- County: Armagh
- Country: Northern Ireland
- Sovereign state: United Kingdom
- Postcode district: BT61
- Dialling code: 028

Ballytyrone (from Irish Baile Tíre Eoghain, meaning 'Tyrone's town') is a small townland of 265 acres (0.4 sq mi) in County Armagh, Northern Ireland. It is situated in the civil parish of Loughgall and the historic barony of Oneilland West.

== See also ==
- List of townlands in County Armagh
