= Fernagreevagh =

Fernagreevagh: Irish: Fearann na gcraobhach
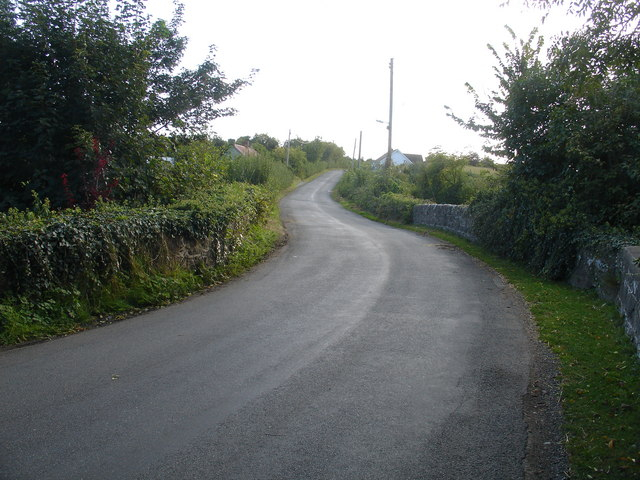
- Fernagreevagh bridge in 2007
- County: Armagh
- Country: Northern Ireland
- Sovereign state: United Kingdom
- Postcode district: BT61
- Dialling code: 028

Fernagreevagh (from Irish Fearann na gcraobhach, meaning 'land of the bushes') is a townland of 290 acres in County Armagh, Northern Ireland. It is situated in the civil parish of Loughgall and the historic barony of Oneilland West.

== See also ==
- List of townlands in County Armagh
