= Turcarra =

Land unit (townland) in Northern Ireland

Turcarra: Irish: Tor carrach
- County: Armagh
- Country: Northern Ireland
- Sovereign state: United Kingdom
- Postcode district: BT61
- Dialling code: 028

Turcarra (from Irish Tor carrach, meaning 'rough tower or hill') is a townland of 339 acres in County Armagh, Northern Ireland. It is situated in the civil parish of Loughgall and the historic barony of Oneilland West.

Castle Dillon House, a Grade B+ listed building, is in the townland.

== See also ==
- List of townlands in County Armagh
