= Derrycoose =

Derrycoose: Irish: Doire cuais
- County: Armagh
- Country: Northern Ireland
- Sovereign state: United Kingdom
- Postcode district: BT62
- Dialling code: 028

Derrycoose (from Irish Doire cuais, meaning 'oakwood of the cave') is a townland of 386 acres in County Armagh, Northern Ireland. It is situated in the civil parish of Loughgall and the historic barony of Oneilland West.

== See also ==
- List of townlands in County Armagh
