= Causanagh =

Townland in Northern Ireland

Causanagh: Irish: Cois-eanach
- County: Armagh
- Country: Northern Ireland
- Sovereign state: United Kingdom
- Postcode district: BT61
- Dialling code: 028

Causanagh (from Irish Cois-eanach, meaning 'foot-marsh') is a townland of 297 acres in County Armagh, Northern Ireland. It is situated in the civil parish of Loughgall and the historic barony of Oneilland West.

== See also ==
- List of townlands in County Armagh
