= Lislasly =

Lislasly: Irish: Lios Lasly
- County: Armagh
- Country: Northern Ireland
- Sovereign state: United Kingdom
- Postcode district: BT71
- Dialling code: 028

Lislasly (from Irish Lios Lasly, meaning 'Lesley Fort') is a townland of 211 acres in County Armagh, Northern Ireland. It is situated in the civil parish of Loughgall and the historic barony of Armagh.

== See also ==
- List of townlands in County Armagh
