= Ballygasey =

Coordinates: 54°24′24″N 6°37′01″W

Ballygasey: Irish: Baile ua gcathasaigh
- Location within Northern Ireland
- County: Armagh
- Country: Northern Ireland
- Sovereign state: United Kingdom
- Postcode district: BT61
- Dialling code: 028

Ballygasey (from Irish Baile ua gcathasaigh, meaning 'town of the O'Caseys') is a townland of 206 acres (0.3 sq mi) in County Armagh, Northern Ireland. It is situated in the civil parish of Loughgall and the historic barony of Oneilland West.

== See also ==
- List of townlands in County Armagh
