= Lisneany =

Lisneany: Irish: Lios an aonaigh
- County: Armagh
- Country: Northern Ireland
- Sovereign state: United Kingdom
- Postcode district: BT61
- Dialling code: 028

Lisneany (from Irish Lios an aonaigh, meaning 'fort of the fair (or market)') is a townland of 216 acres in County Armagh, Northern Ireland. It is situated in the civil parish of Loughgall and the historic barony of Oneilland West.

== See also ==
- List of townlands in County Armagh
