= Oneilland East =

Barony in County Armagh, Northern Ireland

Oneilland East Uí Nialláin Thoir(Irish)
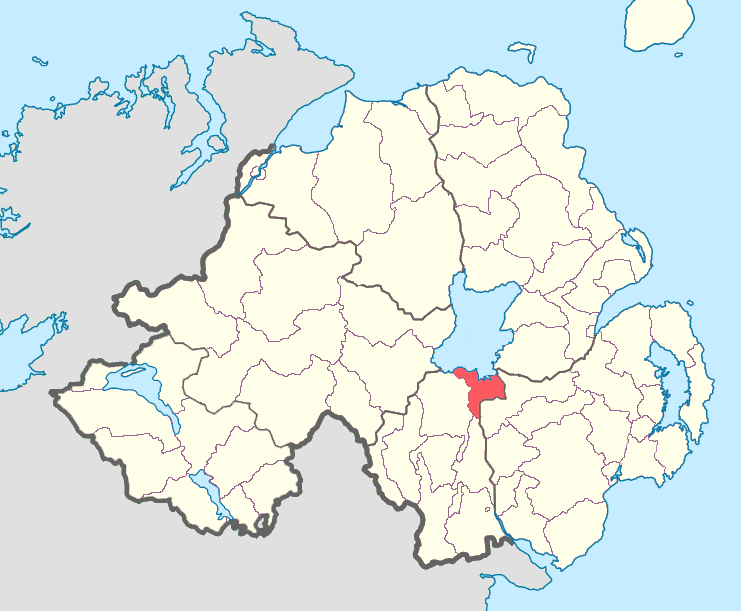
- Location of Oneilland East, County Armagh, Northern Ireland.
- Sovereign state: United Kingdom
- Country: Northern Ireland
- County: Armagh

Oneilland East (from Irish Uí Nialláin, the name of an ancient Gaelic district) is a barony in the north-east of County Armagh, Northern Ireland. It is also called Clanbrasil (from Clann Bhreasail, "offspring of Breasal"). It lies in the north-east corner of the county, on the south-eastern shore of Lough Neagh and the boundary with County Down. Oneilland East is bordered by three other baronies: Oneilland West to the west; Iveagh Lower to the east; and Orior Lower to the south.

== History ==
Oneilland East along with Oneilland West used to form the barony and Plantation of Ulster precinct of Oneilland. When it was split in two, Oneilland East consisted of the barony east of the River Bann, corresponding to the ancient Irish district of Clanbrassil.

Carrickblacker House is in Oneilland East, and is the home of the Blacker family. The Blacker family are claimed as being descended from the Viking Blacar, who was a King of Dublin. On 26 February 943, Blacar defeated Muirchertach mac Néill and his army, near Armagh, allegedly by the River Bann where Carrickblacker now stands.

== List of settlements ==
Below is a list of settlements in Oneilland East:

=== Towns ===
- Craigavon
- Lurgan
- Portadown (eastern part)

=== Villages and population centres ===
- Aghacommon
- Bannfoot
- Derrymacash
- Derrytrasna

== List of civil parishes ==
Below is a list of civil parishes in Oneilland East:

- Magheralin (three townlands, rest in barony of Iveagh Lower, Upper Half)
- Montiaghs
- Seagoe
- Shankill (also partly in barony of Iveagh Lower, Upper Half (one townland))
