= Derryhale =

Village in County Armagh, Northern Ireland

Coordinates: 54.385°N 6.480°W

Derryhale: Irish: Doire Chaol
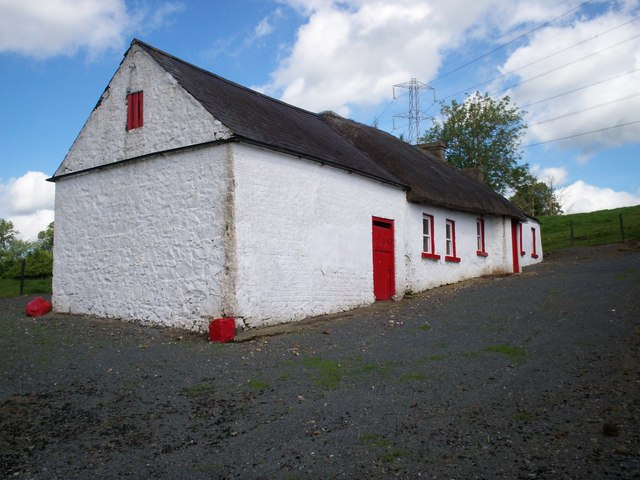
- Boyd's cottage, Derryhale, in 2007

- Location within Northern Ireland
- County: County Armagh
- Country: Northern Ireland
- Sovereign state: United Kingdom
- Postcode district: BT62
- Dialling code: 028

Derryhale (from Irish Doire Chaol, meaning 'narrow oakwood') is a small village and townland (of 834 acres) in County Armagh, Northern Ireland. It lies between Portadown, Richhill and Tandragee. It is situated in the civil parish of Kilmore and the historic barony of Oneilland West. It had a population of 360 people (129 households) in the 2011 Census. (2001 Census: 246 people)

== Archaeology ==
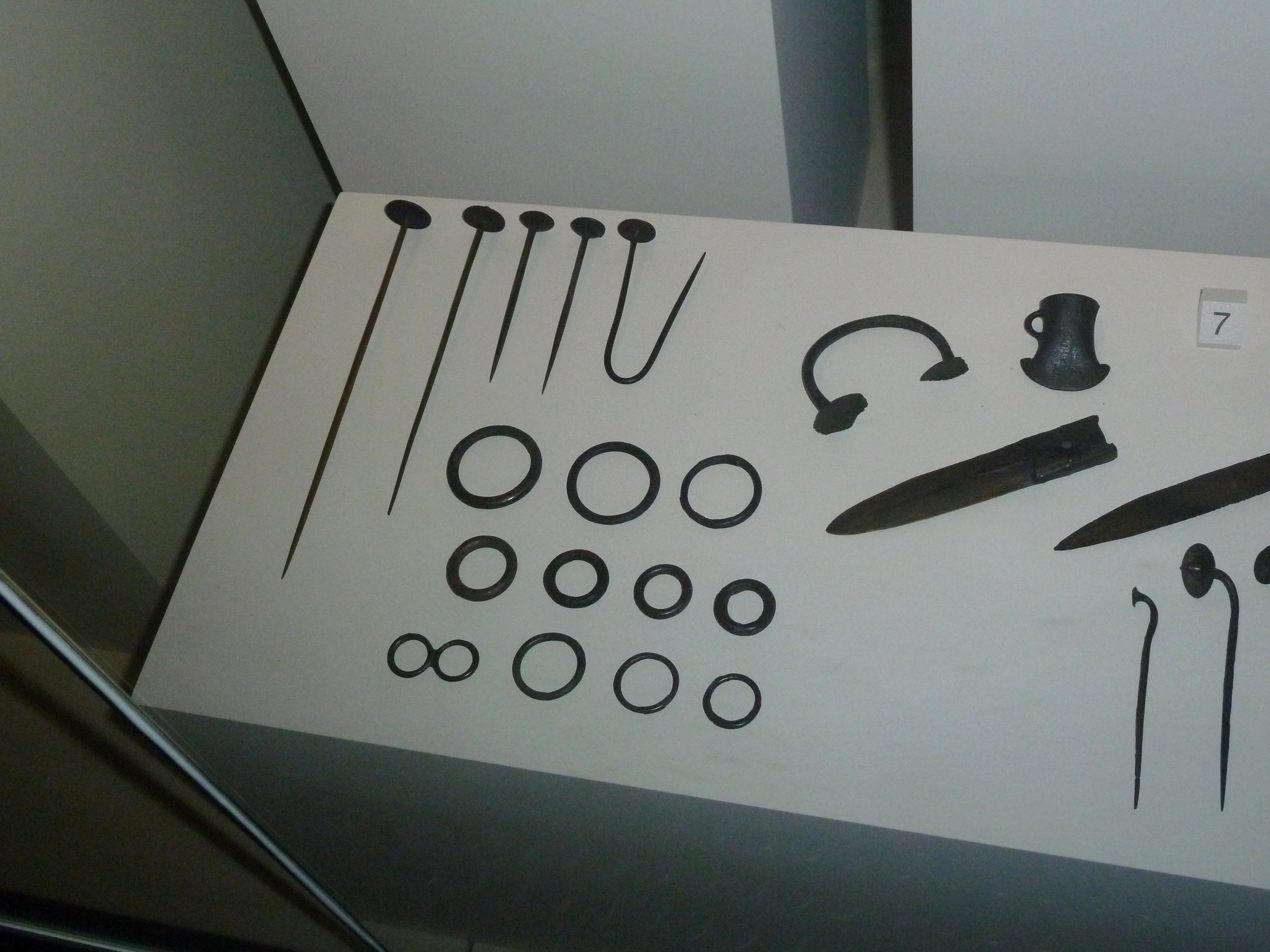
Some of the Derryhale hoard in the Ulster Museum

A Bronze Age hoard was found at Derryhale and included a star-shaped faience bead, knives with ridged tangs and pins.

== Education ==
- Derryhale Primary School
