= Annahugh =

Village in County Armagh, Northern Ireland

Coordinates: 54°24′56″N 6°33′40″W

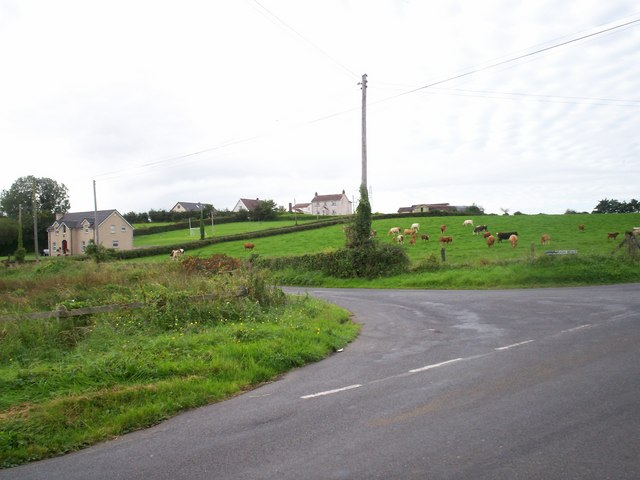
Junction of the Derryloughan Road and the Annahugh Road, Loughgall

Annahugh (from Irish Eanach Aodha 'Hugh's marsh') is a small village and townland near Loughgall in County Armagh, Northern Ireland. While most of the settlement is within the townland of Annahugh, part of it extends into the neighbouring townland of Ballyhagan (Baile Uí hAgáin). Hence, the two names are sometimes used to refer to the same settlement. It is situated within the Armagh City and District Council area. It had a population of 275 people (98 households) in the 2011 Census. (2001 Census: 159 people)

== See also ==
- List of towns and villages in Northern Ireland
