= Shankill, County Armagh =

Civil parish in County Armagh, Northern Ireland

Shankill is a civil parish and townland (of 173 acres) in County Armagh, Northern Ireland. It is situated in the historic barony of Oneilland East, with one townland in the barony of Iveagh Lower, Upper Half in County Down.

== Settlements ==
The civil parish contains the following settlements:

- Lurgan

== Townlands ==
Shankill civil parish contains the following townlands:

- Aghnacloy
- Ballyblagh
- Clanrolla
- Cornakinnegar
- Demesne
- Derry
- Dougher
- Drumnamoe
- Drumnykerne
- Killaghy
- Kilmore
- Knocknashane
- Legaghory
- Liscorran
- Lurgan
- Lurgantarry
- Monbrief
- Shankill
- Taghnevan
- Tannaghmore North
- Tannaghmore South
- Tirsogue
- Toberhewny
- Tullydagan
- Tullygally
- Tullyronnelly

== See also ==
- List of civil parishes of County Armagh
