= Selshion =

Administrative area in Northern Ireland

Coordinates: 54.494°N 6.419°W

Selshion (from Irish Soillsean 'brightness') is a townland in County Armagh, Northern Ireland. It is within the Armagh, Banbridge and Craigavon District Council area, on the western edge of the town of Portadown.
