= Mullaghbrack =

Village in County Armagh, Northern Ireland

Coordinates: 54.320°N 6.530°W

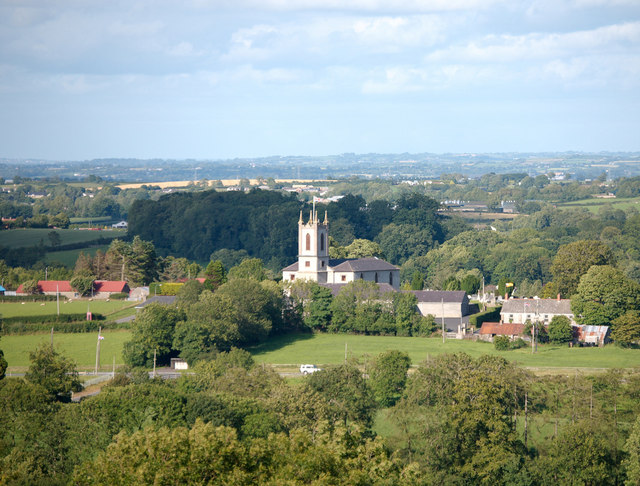
St. John's Church, in Mullaghbrack, lies between Hamiltonsbawn and Markethill

Mullaghbrack, Mullabrack or Mullaghbrac (from Irish An Mullach Breac, meaning 'speckled hilltop') is a small civil parish, townland and village in County Armagh, Northern Ireland. The village of Mullaghbrack is on the road between Markethill and Hamiltonsbawn, just north of Gosford Forest Park. It had a population of 54 people (24 households) in the 2011 census, down from 75 people as of the 2001 census.

== Geography ==
The civil parish of Mullaghbrack (Irish: An Mullach Breac) spans the historic baronies of Fews Lower and Oneilland West in County Armagh. There are at least 43 townlands in the civil parish, including smaller townlands like Crunaght (29 acres (0.12 km^{2})) and slightly larger townlands like Drumnamether (389 acres (1.57 km^{2})). Larger settlements in the civil parish include Markethill and Hamiltonsbawn.

== History ==
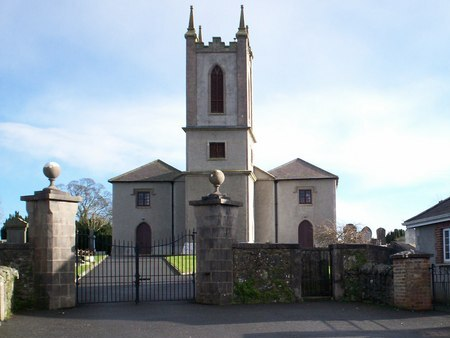
St. Johns's Church, Mullaghbrack

In the 5th century, a simple wooden church was built at Mullaghbrack, within the remains of an ancient earthen-ringed fort. This church is associated with the Culdee Priors of Armagh, who are sometimes regarded as "the successors of St Patrick". The current Church of Ireland church in Mullaghbrack, St. John's Church, was largely rebuilt in the 18th and 19th centuries on the site of an earlier structure. Among the earliest monuments in the church is a plaque dated to 1638.

The area was impacted during the Irish Rebellion of 1641. Irish commander Féilim Ó Néill, on his march from Newry to Armagh in 1641, reputedly ordered Mulmory MacDonell "... to kill all the English and Scots within the parishes of Mullebrack, Logilly and Kilcluney". Among the properties destroyed in the Markethill area were the parish churches of Mullaghbrack and Kilcluney, Achesons Castle at Markethill and Hamilton's bawn. The rectors of Mullaghbrack (Reverend Mercer) and Loughgilly (Reverend Burns) were both killed.

== Sport ==
The local Gaelic Athletic Association (GAA) club is O'Donovan Rossa's (Cumann Uí Dhonnabháin Rossa), founded in 1903 as the Shamrocks; it disappeared in the 1930s but was reformed under its present name in 1953. The high point in the club's history was its winning the Armagh Junior Football Championship in 1983.

== People ==
- Lord William Beresford (William Leslie de la Poer Beresford; 1847–1900), born in Mullabrack, received the Victoria Cross during the Anglo-Zulu War.
