= Lisnalee =

Townland in County Armagh, Northern Ireland

Coordinates: 54.1008333°N 7.2233333°W

Lisnalee is a townland in County Armagh, five miles from Mountnorris and four miles from Bessbrook, the main area known as Lisnalea consists of the Lisnalea Crossroads, this cross roads is the junction of the Drumnahunshion Road with the Main Bessbrook-Mountnorris Road. The cross roads is also the location of the Lisnalea Park housing estate consisting of 21 detached, semi-detached, bungalow houses as well as a games pitch and playpark.

There is currently no public transport operating to this area.
