= Derryadd =

Coordinates: 54.494°N 6.419°W

Derryadd: Irish: Doire Fhada
- Location within Northern Ireland
- Population: 201
- Irish grid reference: J 02390 61179
  - Belfast: 21 mi (34 km)
  - Dublin: 80 mi (130 km)
- District: Armagh City, Banbridge and Craigavon
- County: County Armagh
- Country: Northern Ireland
- Sovereign state: United Kingdom
- Post town: CRAIGAVON
- Postcode district: BT66
- Dialling code: 028
- Police: Northern Ireland
- Fire: Northern Ireland
- Ambulance: Northern Ireland
- UK Parliament: Upper Bann
- NI Assembly: Upper Bann

Derryadd (from Irish Doire Fhada 'long oak-grove') is a hamlet and townland in County Armagh, Northern Ireland. It is within the Armagh City, Banbridge and Craigavon Borough Council area, on the southern shores of Lough Neagh. In the 2001 Census it had a population of 201 people.

Ardmore Primary School closed in 2006 due to low pupil numbers.
