= Drumnacanvy =

Village in County Armagh, Northern Ireland

Coordinates: 54.411°N 6.402°W

Drumnacanvy: Irish: Dromainn Cheannbhuí
- Location within Northern Ireland
- Population: 1,147 (2011 Census)
- District: Armagh, Banbridge and Craigavon
- County: County Armagh
- Country: Northern Ireland
- Sovereign state: United Kingdom
- Post town: Portadown
- Postcode district: BT63
- Dialling code: 028
- UK Parliament: Upper Bann
- NI Assembly: Upper Bann

Drumnacanvy (from Irish: Dromainn Cheannbhuí, meaning 'yellow topped ridge' or 'ridge of the goldcrest') is a small dormitory settlement and townland in County Armagh, Northern Ireland. It lies 1.8 mi east-southeast of Portadown. The settlement lies atop a hill within the Green Belt. It also covers small parts of Drumlisnagrilly and Ballynaghy townlands.

== 2011 Census ==
Drumnacanvy is classified as a small village or hamlet by NI Statistics and Research Agency (NISRA). On Census day (27 March 2011) there were 1,147 people living in Drumnacanvy.

== Poem ==
The following poem is set in Drumnacanvy, based on the Night of the Big Wind:

It came and it came and it came,
Like all the devil's bellows loosed out of hell,
Howlin' and screamin' and cuttin' an callin.'
It came and came, and came upon Drumnacanvy.

The day a-fore was flat calm and quiet
Not a rush or bush or wisp of smoke
Either swayed or wafted, and words spoke in whispers.
A grave foreboding' ta them that lived in Drumnacanvy

Just after the children were pit ta' bed
The breeze first and then the wind started blowin'
Tossing and gusting and comin' on steady.
Soon all was a blur and a whirl around Drumnacanvy.

The fire was clamped doon and the lights pit out
As that winter night's gale gathered in.
A storm they were sure off, but sure it might pass
Pass bye and over the homes of Drumnacanvy.

But nay sleep was had for ony that night,
As the devil's wind kept churnin'
Screechin' in over bog and field
Reaching and tearing at the very heart of Drumnacanvy

Fear gripped all like the devil's own grip
As now this screeching terror bate them.
Takin' the very thatch frae o'er their heeds
Twain thrashed wi' the haggard com of Drumnacanvy

Who might say in this life he has ever met his maker,
Or indeed has ever crossed the path of Satan's works of evil.
That night as terror took its stand
Both were met on common ground, by the people of Drumnacanvy

At dawn of day when shaken men surveyed the scenes around
Only desolation, inhabitation, and sure starvation
Was seen across the measured ground
Where once stood the homes and barns and farms of Drumnacanvy.

Aye! Surely the devil fought that night wi' The God of heaven
And God stayed not his mighty hand in torrent, rain, and thunder.
Never again does common man want to see their titanic struggles,
As he thinks upon the all forlorn, that plundered land of Drumnacanvy.
