= Loughgall =

Village in County Armagh, Northern Ireland

Coordinates: 54.409°N 6.603°W

Loughgall: Irish: Loch gCál
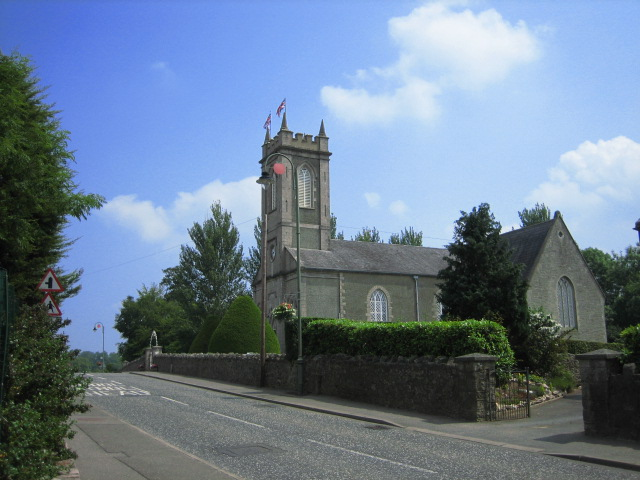
- St Luke's Church of Ireland

- Location within Northern Ireland
- Population: 282 (2011 census)
- Irish grid reference: H908522
- District: Armagh, Banbridge and Craigavon
- County: County Armagh
- Country: Northern Ireland
- Sovereign state: United Kingdom
- Post town: ARMAGH
- Postcode district: BT61
- Dialling code: 028
- UK Parliament: Newry and Armagh
- NI Assembly: Newry and Armagh

Loughgall (/lɒxˈɡɔːl/ lokh-GAWL; from Irish Loch gCál) is a small village, townland (of 131 acres) and civil parish in County Armagh, Northern Ireland. It is in the historic baronies of Armagh and Oneilland West. It had a population of 282 people (in 116 households) as of the 2011 census. Loughgall was named after a small nearby loch. The village is surrounded by orchards.

== History ==
In the Middle Ages the chiefs of the Uí Nialláin, a Gaelic clan, resided at Loughgall crannog, a fortified lake dwelling. By the 16th century the O'Neills of Tír Eoghain had taken over the area, and the crannog became the residence of the O'Neill chief's brother or eldest son.

In the early 1600s, the area was settled by English and Scottish Protestants as part of the Ulster Plantation. During the 1641 Irish Rebellion, settlers were held at a prison camp at Loughgall by Catholic rebels led by Manus O'Cane.

In 1795, rival sectarian gangs, the Catholic Defenders and Protestant Peep-o'-Day Boys fought a bloody skirmish near the village, called the Battle of the Diamond, that left around 30 people dead. Following this, the Protestant Orange Order was founded in Dan Winter's House nearby.

In 2015, Sloan's House was turned into a Museum of Orange Heritage site at a part of a joint project between the Grand Orange Lodge of Ireland and County Armagh Grand Orange Lodge, supported by European Union's PEACE III Programme.

=== The Troubles ===
The Loughgall area experienced a number of fatal incidents during The Troubles, the best known of which is arguably the 1987 Loughgall ambush.

== Sport ==
It is home to Loughgall Football Club, which plays in the NIFL Championship, the second tier of football in Northern Ireland.

== Education ==
The Cope Primary School serves the area. A Roman Catholic primary school was also previously located on the Eagralougher Road, just outside Loughgall, but this closed in 1996.

== People ==
- Poet W. R. Rodgers (1909 – 1969). He later gave up the ministry and became a BBC radio producer and scriptwriter. He died in California in 1969 and was buried in Loughgall.
- Cope family; MPs Robert Cope and Robert Camden Cope; and Anthony Cope (Dean of Armagh)
- Lieutenant-Colonel Sir William Young, 1st Baronet (1771-1848). A soldier with the British East India Company's army, he later became a director of the East India Company. Born on the outskirts of Loughgall, he purchased Bailieborough Castle and its surrounding estate in the south-east of County Cavan in 1814, establishing his chief residence at the castle. Upon his death, Sir William was buried in the graveyard attached to St. Patrick's Church of Ireland Church in Benburb.
- Robert Garland (1862-1949): Born in Charlemont, Loughgall, County Armagh, and later lived in Pennsylvania, United States. This individual was known for his role in convincing the U.S. government to institute daylight saving time.

== Civil parish of Loughgall ==
The civil parish of Loughgall, which spans the villages of Annaghmore, Charlemont and Loughgall, also contains the following townlands:

- Aghinlig
- Altaturk
- Annaghmacmanus
- Annaghmore
- Annasamry
- Ardress East, Ardress West
- Ballygasey
- Ballymagerny
- Ballytyrone
- Borough of Charlemont
- Causanagh
- Clonmain
- Cloven Eden
- Coragh
- Corr and Dunavally
- Derrycoose
- Derrycrew
- Drumart
- Drumharriff
- Drumilly
- Drumnasoo
- Dunavally and Corr
- Eagralougher
- Fernagreevagh
- Keenaghan
- Kinnegoe
- Kishaboy
- Legavilly
- Levalleglish
- Lislasly
- Lisneany
- Lissheffield
- Loughgall
- Mullaghbane
- Mullaghmore
- Mullanasilla
- Rathdrumgran
- Tirmacrannon
- Turcarra

== See also ==
- Market houses in Northern Ireland
- List of civil parishes of County Armagh
- List of townlands in County Armagh
