= Loughgilly =

Village in County Armagh, Northern Ireland

Coordinates: 54°16′50″N 6°28′49″W

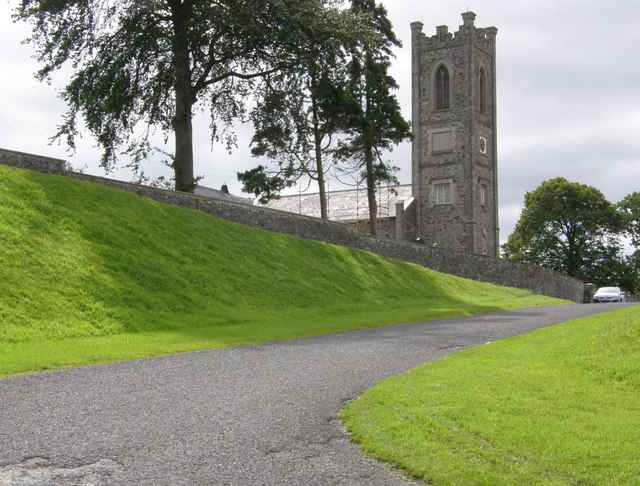
St Patrick's Church, Loughgilly

Loughgilly (/lɒxˈɡɪli/ lokh-GIL-ee; from Irish Loch Gile or Loch Goilí) is a small village, townland and civil parish in County Armagh, Northern Ireland. It is on the main Armagh to Newry road, about halfway between the two. It is within the Armagh City and District Council area. It had a population of 84 people (42 households) in the 2011 Census. (2001 census: 69 people)

== History ==
The Loughgilly Together residents group was formed in October 1942 by people worried about deterioration of facilities and the appearance of the area. Today it runs a park and children's play area.

== See also ==
- List of civil parishes of County Armagh
