= Hamiltonsbawn =

Village in County Armagh, Northern Ireland

Coordinates: 54.3416°N 6.5421°W

- Village
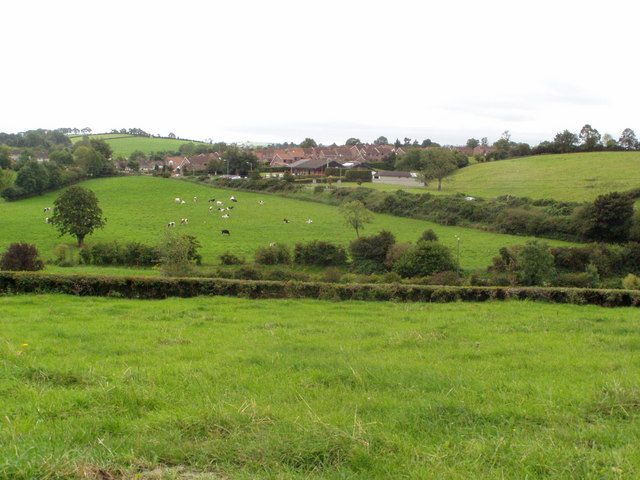
- Hamiltonsbawn from the Richhill side of the village

- Location within Northern Ireland
- Population: 895 (2001 Census)
- Irish grid reference: H946445
  - Belfast: 37 miles
- District: Armagh City & District
- County: County Armagh
- Country: Northern Ireland
- Sovereign state: United Kingdom
- Post town: ARMAGH
- Postcode district: BT60
- Dialling code: 028, +44 28
- UK Parliament: Newry & Armagh
- NI Assembly: Newry & Armagh

Hamiltonsbawn or Hamilton's Bawn is a village in County Armagh, Northern Ireland, five miles (8 km) east of Armagh. It lies within the civil parish of Mullabrack and the Armagh, Banbridge and Craigavon District Council area. It had a population of 895 people (343 households) in the 2011 census.

== History ==
=== Name ===
The name Hamiltonsbawn is associated with John Hamilton (c. 1568–1639), a brother of Sir James Hamilton (c. 1560–1644), who owned large estates in the area and reportedly established a number of settlements in County Armagh and County Cavan. Hamilton, who is reputed to have founded the settlement in the 17th century, had a fortified house and defensive courtyard (or bawn) in the area. The bawn was destroyed during the Irish Rebellion of 1641.

=== Pennsylvania connection ===
The township of Hamiltonban in Adams County, Pennsylvania, was founded by a relative of John Hamilton in the mid-late 18th century, and reputedly named after Hamilton's Bawn.

=== Transport history ===
Hamiltonsbawn railway station opened on 25 August 1864 and was closed on 1 February 1933. The Armagh rail disaster of 1889, which resulted in the deaths of at least 80 people, occurred on a stretch of the Newry and Armagh railway line near Hamiltonsbawn.

== Amenities ==
The local primary school, Hamiltonsbawn Primary School, is located on the Annareagh Road.

== Notable people ==
- Seth Dunwoody, cyclist
- Vicky Irwin, rugby player with the Ireland women's national rugby union team
- Holly Lester, electronic dance music DJ

== See also ==
- List of towns and villages in Northern Ireland
- Newtownhamilton, a village in County Armagh also associated with the Hamilton family
