= Cladymore =

Village in County Armagh, Northern Ireland

Coordinates: 54.260°N 6.558°W

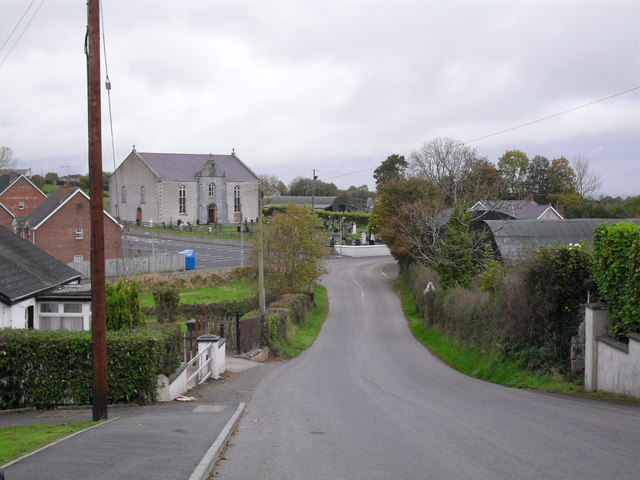

Cladymore or Clady More (from Irish Cláidigh Mhór) is a small village and townland in County Armagh, Northern Ireland. It is within the Armagh City and District Council area. It had a population of 139 people (52 households) in the 2011 Census. (2001 Census: 129 people)
