= Armagh (barony) =

Armagh Ard Mhacha(Irish)
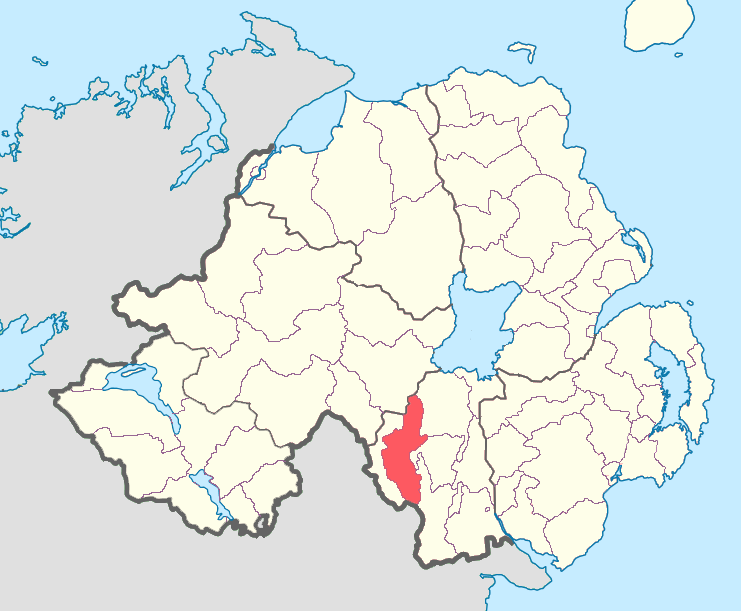
- Location of Armagh, County Armagh, Northern Ireland
- Coordinates: 54°18′58″N 6°43′01″W
- Sovereign state: United Kingdom
- Country: Northern Ireland
- County: Armagh

Armagh (named after the city of Armagh) is a barony in County Armagh, Northern Ireland. It lies in the west of the county, bordering County Tyrone with its north-western boundary, and bordering the Republic of Ireland with its southern boundary. It is bordered by five other baronies in Northern Ireland: Tiranny to the west, Dungannon Middle to the north-west, Oneilland West to the north-east, Fews Lower to the east, and Fews Upper to the south-east. It also borders to the south the barony of Cremorne in the Republic of Ireland.

== Geographical features ==
Some of the geographical features of Armagh barony include:

- Loughnashade
- Kinnegoe Bog
- Creaghan Stream
- Yellow Ford, where the Battle of the Yellow Ford took place in 1598

== List of settlements ==
Below is a list of settlements in Armagh:

=== Towns ===
- Armagh (also part in barony of Oneilland West)

=== Villages and population centres ===
- Charlemont
- Killevy
- Milford

== List of civil parishes ==
Below is a list of civil parishes in Armagh:

- Armagh (split with barony of Oneilland West)
- Clonfeacle (also partly in baronies of Dungannon Lower [one townland], Dungannon Middle and Oneilland West)
- Eglish (split with barony of Tiranny)
- Grange (split with barony of Oneilland West)
- Keady (also partly in barony of Tiranny)
- Lisnadill (split with baronies of Fews Lower and Fews Upper)
- Loughgall (also partly in barony of Oneilland West)
