= Oneilland West =

Barony in County Armagh, Northern Ireland

Oneilland West Uí Nialláin Thiar(Irish)
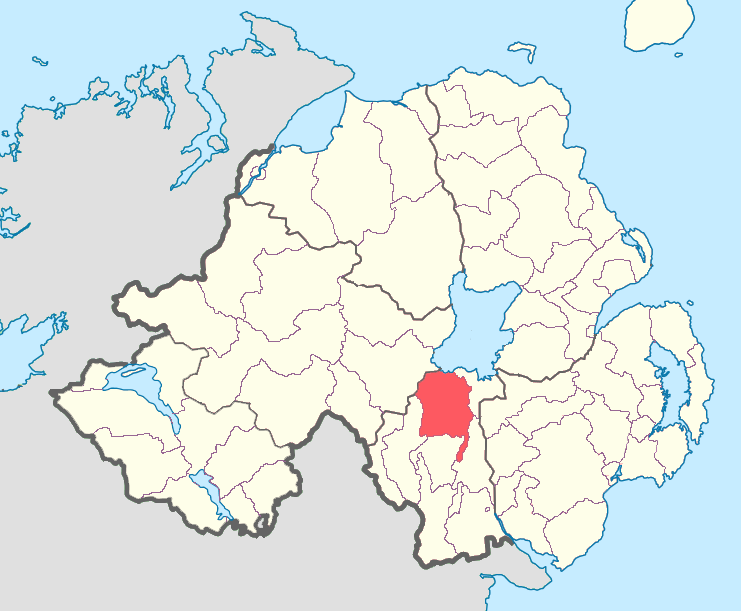
- Location of Oneilland West, County Armagh, Northern Ireland.
- Sovereign state: United Kingdom
- Country: Northern Ireland
- County: Armagh

Oneilland West (from Irish Uí Nialláin, the name of an ancient Gaelic district) is a barony in County Armagh, Northern Ireland. It is also called Clancann (Clann Chana), after the Mac Cana clan. It lies in the north of the county on the south-western shore of Lough Neagh and the border of County Tyrone. Oneilland West is bordered by five other baronies: Armagh to the west; Dungannon Middle to the north-west; Oneilland East to the north-east; Orior Lower to the south-east; and Kinelarty to the south.

== History ==
Oneilland West along with Oneilland East used to form the barony and Plantation of Ulster precinct of Oneilland. When it was split in two, Oneilland West consisted of the barony west of the River Bann, corresponding to the ancient Irish districts of Oneilland and Clancann.

Mount Roe house is located in this barony. The Battle of the Diamond on 21 September 1795, which led to the foundation of the Orange Order, occurred within this barony at The Diamond crossroads.

== List of settlements ==
Below is a list of settlements in Oneilland West:

=== Towns ===
- Armagh (part in barony of Armagh)
- Richhill
- Portadown

=== Villages and population centres ===
- Annaghmore
- Charlemont
- Loughgall
- Scotch Street
- The Birches
- The Diamond

== List of civil parishes ==
Below is a list of civil parishes in Oneilland West:

- Armagh (split with barony of Armagh)
- Clonfeacle (also partly in baronies of Armagh, Dungannon Lower (one townland) and Dungannon Middle)
- Drumcree
- Grange (split with barony of Armagh)
- Kildarton (split with barony of Fews Lower)
- Killyman (also partly in barony of Dungannon Middle)
- Kilmore (split with barony of Orior Lower)
- Loughgall (also partly in barony of Armagh)
- Mullaghbrack (split with barony of Fews Lower)
- Newry (two townlands, rest in baronies of Iveagh Upper, Lower Half, Lordship of Newry and Orior Upper)
- Tartaraghan
