= County Armagh =

County in Northern Ireland

County Armagh Contae Ard Mhacha (Irish) Coontie Airmagh/Armagh (Ulster-Scots)
- County
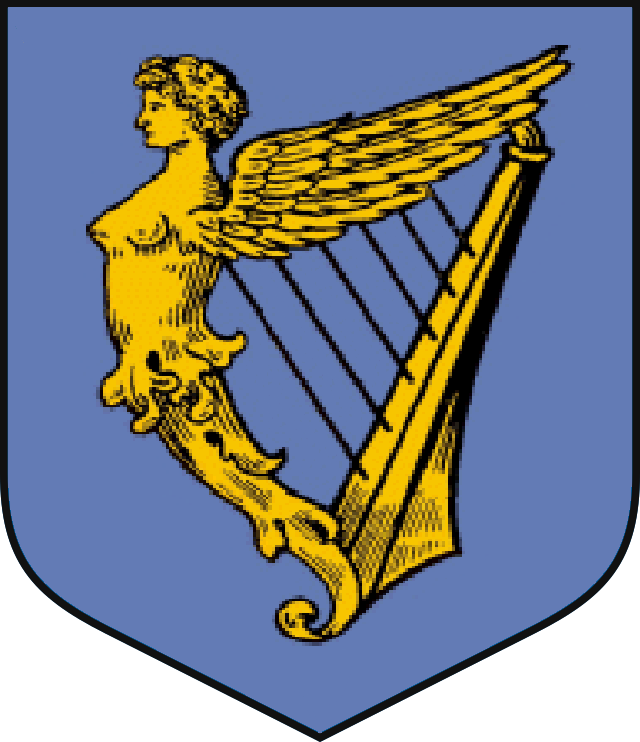
- Coat of arms
- Nickname: The Orchard County
- Coordinates: 54.35°N 6.65°W
- Country: United Kingdom
- Region: Northern Ireland
- Province: Ulster
- Established: 1584/5
- County town: Armagh

Area
  - Total: 512 sq mi (1,327 km^{2})
- Highest elevation (Slieve Gullion): 1,880 ft (573 m)

Population (2021)
  - Total: 194,394
  - Rank: 10th
  - Density: 379.4/sq mi (146.5/km^{2})
- Time zone: UTC±0 (GMT)
  - Summer (DST): UTC+1 (BST)
- Postcode area: BT
- Contae Ard Mhacha is the Irish name; Coontie Armagh and Coontie Airmagh are Ulster Scots spellings.

County Armagh (Note: English: /ɑːrˈmɑː/ ar-MAH, Irish: [ˌaːɾˠd̪ˠ ˈwaxə]) (Irish: Contae Ard Mhacha) is one of the six counties of Northern Ireland and one of the traditional thirty-two counties of Ireland. It is located in the province of Ulster and adjoins the southern shore of Lough Neagh. It borders the Northern Irish counties of Tyrone to the west and Down to the east. The county borders Louth and Monaghan to the south and southwest, which are in the Republic of Ireland. It is named after its county town, Armagh, which derives from the Irish Ard Mhacha, meaning "Macha's height". Macha was a sovereignty goddess in Irish mythology and is said to have been buried on a wooded hill around which the town of Armagh grew. County Armagh is colloquially known as the "Orchard County" because of its many apple orchards.

The county covers an area of 1,327 km^{2} (512 mi^{2}), making it the smallest of Northern Ireland's six counties by size and the sixth-smallest county on the island of Ireland. With a population of 194,394 as of the 2021 census, it is the fourth-most populous county in both Northern Ireland and Ulster. It is the 10th most populous of Ireland's 32 traditional counties, as well as the fifth-most densely populated. In addition to the city of Armagh and the western portion of the city of Newry, notable towns in the county include Lurgan, Portadown and Craigavon.

== Etymology ==
The name Armagh derives from the Irish Ard Macha, meaning Macha's height/Macha's high place. Macha is a mythological figure who is mentioned in The Book of the Taking of Ireland. Macha is also said to have been responsible for the construction of the hill site of Emain Macha (now Navan Fort near Armagh City) to serve as the capital of the Ulaid kings (who give their name to Ulster) and is believed to be the high place from which the county takes its name.

== Geography and features ==
From its highest point at Slieve Gullion, in the south of the county, Armagh's land falls away from its rugged south with Carrigatuke, Lislea and Camlough mountains, to rolling drumlin country in the middle and west of the county. In the north it gives way to flatlands where rolling flats and small hills reach sea level at Lough Neagh.

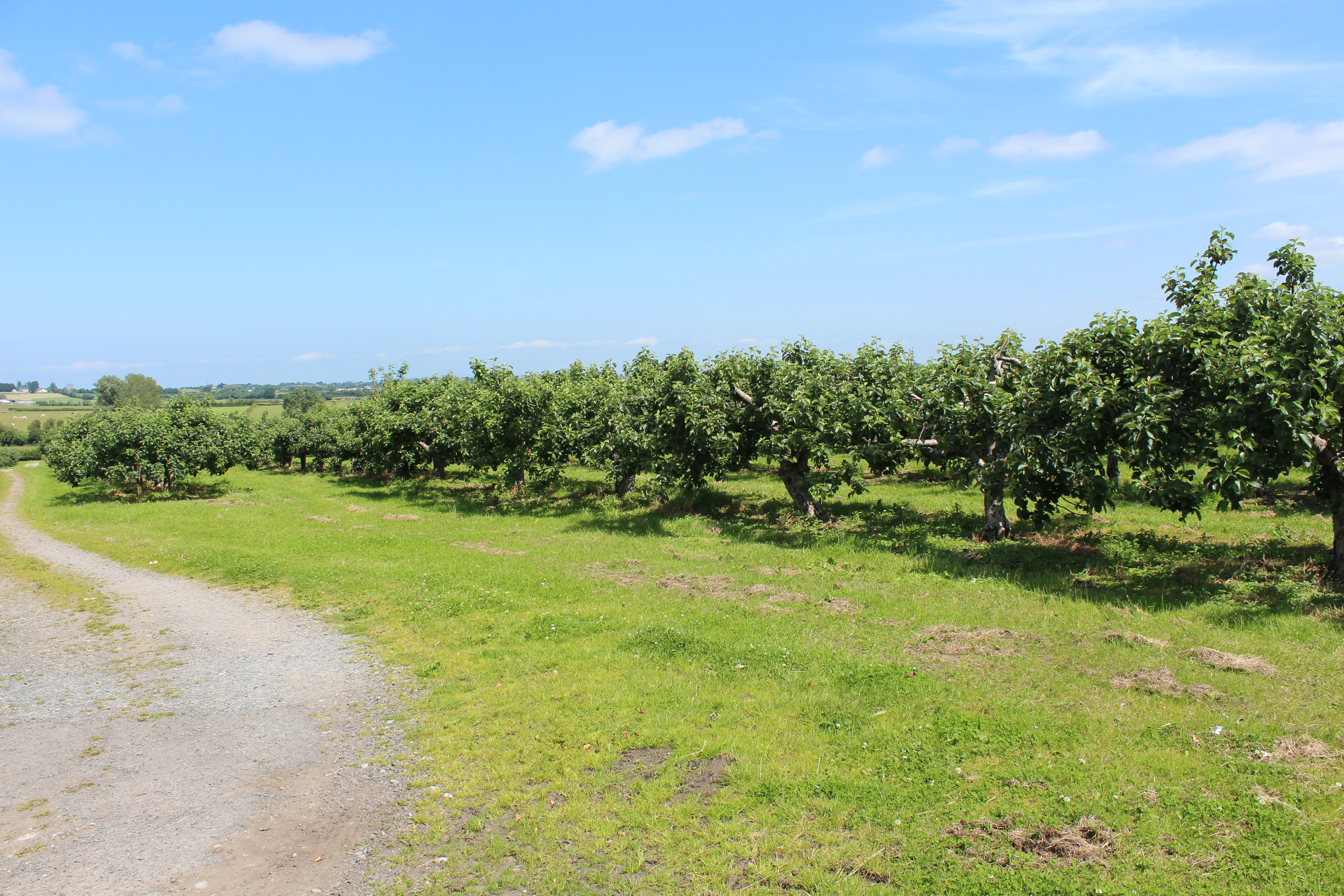
An orchard near Drummannon

County Armagh's boundary with Louth is marked by the rugged Ring of Gullion rising in the south of the county, whilst much of its boundary with counties Monaghan and Down goes unnoticed with seamless continuance of drumlins and small lakes. The River Blackwater marks the border with County Tyrone, and Lough Neagh otherwise marks the county's northern boundary.

Numerous uninhabited islands are located in the county's section of Lough Neagh: Coney Island Flat, Croaghan Flat, Padian, Phil Roe's Flat, and the Shallow Flat.

=== Climate ===
Despite lying in the east of Ireland, Armagh enjoys an oceanic climate strongly influenced by the Gulf Stream: featuring damp mild winters, and temperate, wet summers. Overall temperatures rarely drop below freezing during daylight hours, though frost is not infrequent in the months November to February. Snow rarely lies for longer than a few hours even in the elevated south-east of the county. Summers are mild and wet and, although with sunshine often interspersed with showers, daylight lasts for almost 18 hours during high-summer.

On 22 July 2021 the record for highest outside air temperature ever measured in Northern Ireland was set in Armagh City when a reading of 31.4 °C was registered at Armagh Observatory's weather station.

Climate data for County Armagh
Month	Jan	Feb	Mar	Apr	May	Jun	Jul	Aug	Sep	Oct	Nov	Dec	Year
Mean daily maximum °C	7	7.6	9.7	12.2	15.2	17.7	19.6	19.2	16.6	13	9.5	7.6	12.9
Mean daily minimum °C	1.7	1.7	2.9	4	6.3	9.1	11.4	11	9	6.7	3.5	2.4	5.8
Average precipitation mm	79.8	57.5	64.9	55.4	54.4	55.7	52.3	71.9	67.1	81.1	72.1	83.4	759.4
Mean daily maximum °F	45	45.7	49.5	54.0	59.4	63.9	67.3	66.6	61.9	55	49.1	45.7	55.2
Mean daily minimum °F	35.1	35.1	37.2	39	43.3	48.4	52.5	52	48	44.1	38.3	36.3	42.4
Average precipitation inches	3.14	2.26	2.56	2.18	2.14	2.19	2.06	2.83	2.64	3.19	2.84	3.28	29.90

== History ==
Historical population
Year	Pop.	±%
1653	5,904	—
1659	6,748	+14.3%
1821	197,427	+2825.7%
1831	220,134	+11.5%
1841	232,393	+5.6%
1851	196,084	−15.6%
1861	190,086	−3.1%
1871	179,260	−5.7%
1881	163,177	−9.0%
1891	143,289	−12.2%
1901	125,392	−12.5%
1911	120,291	−4.1%
1926	110,070	−8.5%
1937	108,815	−1.1%
1951	114,154	+4.9%
1961	117,594	+3.0%
1966	125,164	+6.4%
1971	133,969	+7.0%
1981	133,230	−0.6%
1991	141,585	+6.3%
2001	162,957	+15.1%
2011	174,792	+7.3%
2021	194,394	+11.2%

Ancient Armagh was the territory of the Ulaid (also known as Voluntii, Ultonians, Ulidians, Ulstermen) before the fourth century AD. It was ruled by the Red Branch, whose capital was Emain Macha (or Navan Fort) near Armagh. The site, and subsequently the city, were named after the goddess Macha. The Red Branch play an important role in the Ulster Cycle, as well as the Cattle Raid of Cooley. However, they were eventually driven out of the area by the Three Collas, who invaded in the 4th century and held power until the 12th. The Clan Colla ruled the area known as Airghialla or Oriel for these 800 years.

The chief Irish clans of the county were descendants of the Collas, the O'Hanlons and Mac Cana, and the Uí Néill, the O'Neills of Fews. Armagh was divided into several baronies: Armagh was held by the O'Rogans, Lower Fews was held by O'Neill of the Fews, and Upper Fews were under governance of the O'Larkins, who were later displaced by the MacCanns. Oneilland East was the territory of the O'Garveys, who were also displaced by the MacCanns. Oneilland West, like Oneilland East, was once O'Neill territory, until it was then held by the MacCanns, who were Lords of Clanbrassil. Upper and Lower Orior were O'Hanlon territory. Tiranny was ruled by Ronaghan. Miscellaneous tracts of land were ruled by O'Kelaghan. The area around the base of Slieve Gullion near Newry also became home to a large number of the Clan McGuinness as they were dispossessed of hereditary lands held in the County Down.

St. Patrick is considered the first bishop of the Diocese of Armagh. The 9th-century Irish illuminated manuscript Book of Armagh (also known as the Cannon of Patrick) contains accounts of Patricks' life, his Confessio and a complete New Testament. The book is now held at the library of Trinity College Dublin.

During the 17th and 18th centuries, County Armagh was a major center of guerrilla warfare, cattle raiding, and brigandage by local Rapparees; including Count Redmond O'Hanlon, Cormacke Raver O'Murphy, and Séamus Mór Mac Murchaidh.

County Armagh is presently one of four counties of Northern Ireland to have a majority of the population from a Catholic background, according to the 2011 census.

=== The Troubles ===
The southern part of the county has been a stronghold of support for the Provisional IRA, earning it the nickname "Bandit Country". South Armagh is predominantly nationalist, with much of the population being opposed to any form of British presence, especially that of a military nature. The most prominent opposition to British rule was the Provisional IRA South Armagh Brigade.

On 10 March 2009, the Continuity Irish Republican Army (CIRA), a republican paramilitary group that emerged from a split in the Provisional IRA, claimed responsibility for the fatal shooting of a PSNI officer in Craigavon, County Armagh—the first police fatality in Northern Ireland since 1998. The officer was fatally shot by a sniper as he and a colleague investigated "suspicious activity" at a house nearby when a window was smashed by youths causing the occupant to phone the police. The PSNI officers responded to the emergency call, giving a CIRA sniper the chance to shoot and kill officer Stephen Carroll.

== Administration ==
The county was administered by Armagh County Council from 1899 until the abolition of county councils in Northern Ireland in 1973.

County Armagh remains officially used for purposes such as a Lieutenancy area – the county retains a lord lieutenant who acts as representative of the British Monarch in the county.

Currently the county is covered for local government purposes by three district councils, namely Armagh, Banbridge and Craigavon Borough Council, approximately the western third of Newry, Mourne and Down Council and a part of Mid Ulster District Council, centred around Peatlands Park.

Armagh ceased to serve as an electoral constituency in 1983 but remains the core of the Newry and Armagh constituency represented at Westminster and the Newry and Armagh constituency represented in the Northern Ireland Assembly. County Armagh also remains as a district for legal and property purposes; however, its baronies no longer have any administrative use.

The -XZ suffix is currently used on vehicle registration plates for vehicles registered in County Armagh. Other suffixes have been -IB and -LZ. These marks are followed by up to four numbers, e.g., JLZ 6789

== Demography ==
Religious Background in Armagh (2021)
Religion	Per cent
Catholic	58.2%
Protestant and Other Christian	34.0%
None	6.7%
Other faiths	1.2%

As of the 2021 Census, County Armagh recorded a population of 194,394. It is one of four counties in Northern Ireland with a Catholic majority, with 58% of the population coming from a Catholic community background. Around 10% of the population was born outside the United Kingdom and Ireland, mainly immigrants from the European Union and concentrated in the Craigavon urban area (Lurgan, Portadown and Craigavon).

=== Community background and religion ===
Religion or religion brought up in (2021 Census)
Religion or religion brought up in	Number	(%)
Catholic	113,093	58.2
Protestant and Other Christian	66,021	34.0
None (no religion)	13,018	6.7
Other religion	2,262	1.2
Total	194,394	100.0

Religion (2021 Census)
Religion	Number	(%)
Christian	166,538	85.7
Catholic	107,058	55.1
Church of Ireland	24,437	12.6
Presbyterian	17,560	9.0
Methodist	4,194	2.2
Other Christian (including Christian related)	13,290	6.8
Protestant and Other Christian: Total	59,481	30.6
Other	2,037	1.0
Islam	882	0.5
Hinduism	168	0.09
Other religions	986	0.5
None/not stated	25,820	13.3
No religion	22,944	11.8
Religion not stated	2,876	1.5
Total	194,394	100.0

=== Ethnicity ===
Ethnic groups (2021 Census)
Ethnic group	Number	(%)
White: Total	188,347	96.9
White: British/Irish/Northern Irish/English/Scottish/Welsh (with or without non-UK or Irish national identities)	172,923	89.0
White: Other	14,542	7.5
White: Irish Traveller	675	0.3
White: Roma	207	0.1
Asian or Asian British: Total	2,445	1.3
Asian/Asian British: Indian	615	0.3
Asian/Asian British: Chinese	589	0.3
Asian/Asian British: Filipino	405	0.2
Asian/Asian British: Pakistani	192	0.01
Asian/Asian British: Arab	107	0.055
Asian/Asian British: Other Asian	537	0.3
Black or Black British: Total	1,597	0.8
Black/Black British: Black African	1,086	0.6
Black/Black British: Black Other	511	0.2
Mixed: Total	1,480	0.8
Other: Any other ethnic group: Total	522	0.3
Total	194,394	100.0

=== Country of birth ===
Country of birth (2021 Census)
Country of birth	Number	(%)
United Kingdom and Ireland	175,548	90.3
Northern Ireland	162,213	83.4
England	5,931	3.1
Scotland	1,071	0.6
Wales	234	0.1
Republic of Ireland	6,099	3.1
Europe	14,440	7.4
European Union	13,946	7.2
Other non-EU countries	494	0.2
Rest of World	4,406	2.3
Middle East and Asia	2,356	1.2
Africa	921	0.5
North America, Central America and Caribbean	649	0.3
Antarctica, Oceania and Other	250	0.1
South America	230	0.1
Total	194,394	100.0

=== Languages spoken ===
Main language of all usual residents aged 3 or over (2021 Census)
Main language	Usual residents aged 3+	(%)
English	171,713	92.0
Polish	3,818	2.0
Lithuanian	2,860	1.5
Portuguese	1,745	0.9
Bulgarian	1,575	0.8
Romanian	725	0.4
Irish	564	0.3
All other languages	3,677	2.0
Total (usual residents aged 3+)	186,677	100.0

=== Knowledge of Irish ===
Ability in Irish of all usual residents aged 3 or over (2021 Census)
Ability in Irish	Number	(%)
Speaks, reads, writes and understands Irish	9,803	5.3
Speaks and reads but does not write Irish	1,206	0.6
Speaks but does not read or write Irish	4,952	2.7
Understands but does not read, write or speak Irish	13,150	7.0
Other combination of skills	2,553	1.4
Has some knowledge of Irish: Total	31,665	17.0
No ability in Irish	155,012	83.0
Total (usual residents aged 3+)	186,677	100.0

- In County Armagh, 2.95% claim to use Irish daily and 0.29% claim Irish is their main language.

=== Knowledge of Ulster Scots ===
Ability in Ulster Scots of all usual residents aged 3 or over (2021 Census)
Ability in Ulster Scots	Number	(%)
Speaks, reads, writes and understands Ulster Scots	1,653	0.9
Speaks and reads but does not write Ulster Scots	723	0.4
Speaks but does not read or write Ulster Scots	1,795	1.0
Understands but does not read, write or speak Ulster Scots	8,813	4.7
Other combination of skills	1,310	0.7
Has some knowledge of Ulster Scots: Total	14,294	7.7
No ability in Ulster Scots	172,383	92.3
Total (usual residents aged 3+)	186,677	100.0

- 0.98% claim to use Ulster Scots daily in County Armagh.

=== National identity ===
National identity (2021 Census)
National identity	Number	%
Irish only	75,841	39.0%
British only	48,076	24.7%
Northern Irish only	32,569	16.8%
British and Northern Irish only	11,039	5.7%
Irish and Northern Irish only	3,327	1.7%
British, Irish and Northern Irish only	1,521	0.8%
British and Irish only	773	0.4%
Other identity	21,248	10.9%
Total	194,394	Total
All Irish identities	82,057	42.2%
All British identities	62,771	32.3%
All Northern Irish identities	49,424	25.4%

== Settlements ==
=== Large towns ===
(population of 18,000 or more and under 75,000 at 2001 Census)

- Newry (though part of the settlement is in County Down)
- Craigavon, includes:
  - Lurgan
  - Portadown

=== Medium towns ===
(population of 10,000 or more and under 18,000 at 2001 Census)

- Armagh (has city status)

=== Small towns ===
(population of 4,500 or more and under 10,000 at 2001 Census)

- none

=== Intermediate settlements ===
(population of 2,250 or more and under 4,500 at 2001 Census)

- Bessbrook
- Keady
- Richhill
- Tandragee

=== Villages ===
(population of 1,000 or more and under 2,250 at 2001 Census)

- Crossmaglen
- Markethill
- Mullavilly/Laurelvale
- Poyntzpass (a part of the settlement is in County Down)

=== Small villages or hamlets ===
(population of fewer than 1,000 at 2001 Census)

- Acton
- Annaghmore
- Annahugh
- Aughanduff
- Ardress
- Ballymacnab
- Bannfoot
- Belleeks
- Blackwatertown
- Bleary
- Broomhill
- Camlough
- Clonmore
- Charlemont
- Cladymore
- Creggan
- Cullaville
- Cullyhanna
- Darkley
- Derryadd
- Derryhale
- Derrymacash
- Derrymore
- Derrynoose
- Derrytrasna
- Dorsey
- Dromintee
- Drumnacanvy
- Edenaveys
- Forkill
- Hamiltonsbawn
- Jonesborough
- Killean
- Killylea
- Kilmore
- Lislea
- Lisnadill
- Loughgall
- Loughgilly
- Madden
- Maghery
- Meigh
- Middletown
- Milford
- Mountnorris
- Mullaghbawn
- Mullaghbrack
- Mullaghglass
- Newtownhamilton
- Scotch Street
- Silverbridge
- Tartaraghan
- Tynan
- Whitecross

== Subdivisions ==
Baronies

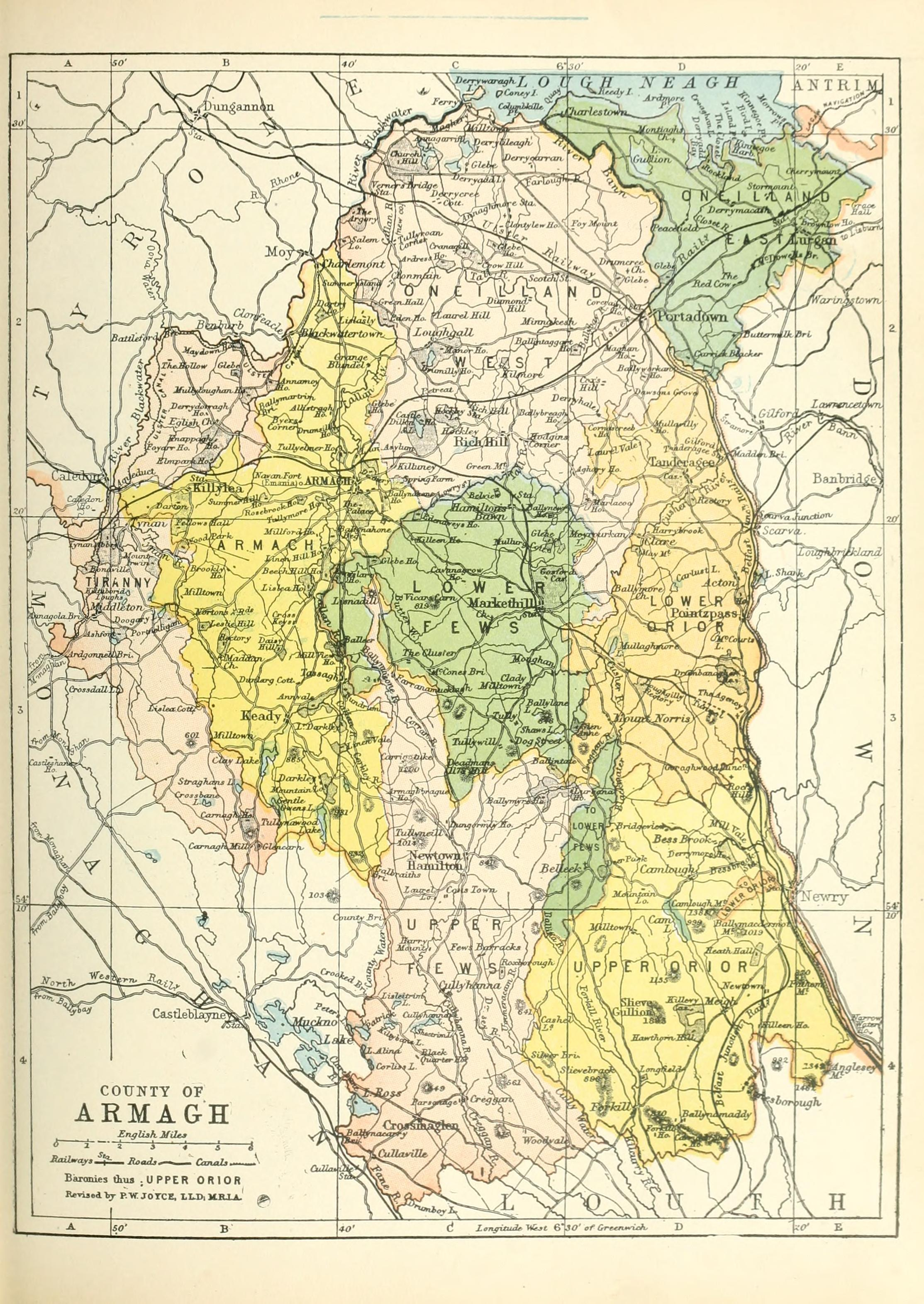
The Baronies of County Armagh (1900)

Main article: Baronies of Ireland
- Armagh
- Fews Lower
- Fews Upper
- Oneilland East
- Oneilland West
- Orior Lower
- Orior Upper
- Tiranny

Parishes

Main article: List of civil parishes of County Armagh

Townlands

Main article: List of townlands in County Armagh

== Transport ==
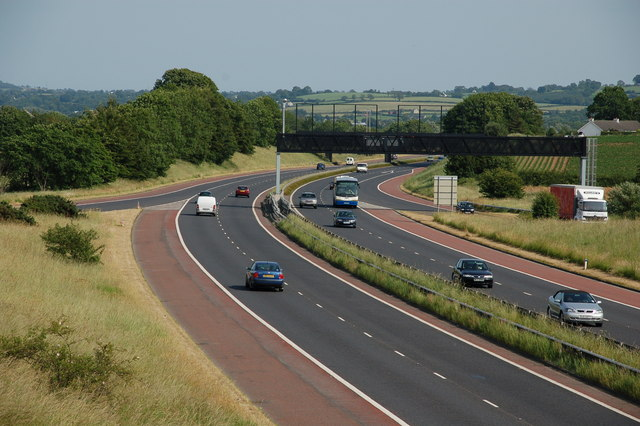
The M1 near Lurgan

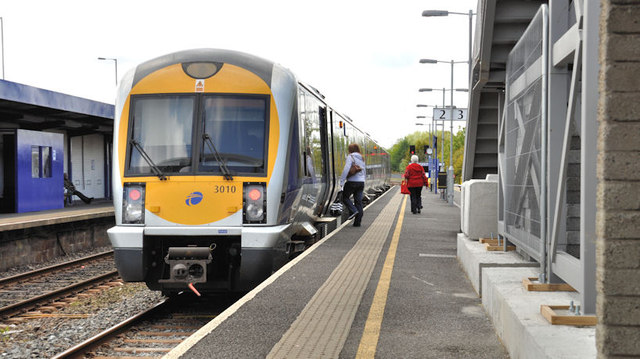
Portadown railway station

County Armagh is traversed by two major highways – the M1 linking Belfast to Dungannon crosses the north of the county whilst the A1/N1 from Belfast to Dublin runs in the far south east. Other major roads in the county include the A3 and A29.

Armagh once had a well-developed railway network with connections to, among others, Armagh City, Culloville, Goraghwood, Markethill, Vernersbridge, Tynan (see History of rail transport in Ireland) but today only Newry (Bessbrook), Portadown, Poyntzpass, Scarva, and Lurgan are served by rail.

There is a possible railway re-opening from Portadown to Armagh in the future. Government Minister for the Department for Regional Development, Danny Kennedy MLA indicates railway restoration plans of the line from Portadown to Armagh.

Ulsterbus provides the most extensive public transport system within the county, including frequent bus transfers daily from most towns to Belfast. Northern Ireland Railways/Iarnród Éireann's Enterprise service provides connections to Dublin in little over an hour and Belfast in little over forty minutes, several times daily.

== Inland waterways ==
County Armagh is traversed by the Ulster Canal and the Newry Canal which are not fully open to navigation.

== Sport ==
In association football, the NIFL Premiership, which operates as the top division, has one team in the county: Glenavon, with Portadown, Annagh United, Armagh City, Dollingstown, Loughgall and Lurgan Celtic competing in the NIFL Championship, which operates as levels two and three.

The Armagh County Board of the Gaelic Athletic Association organises Gaelic games in the county.

== Music ==
County Armagh has a strong tradition of loyalist and unionist marching bands, mostly accordion bands. Marching bands performing at annual parades and community events include the Aughnagurgan Accordion Band, Pride of the Birches Accordion Band and the Edgarstown Accordion Band. The latter two performed in the 2024 Belfast International Tattoo. The County Armagh Accordion Band made their debut on the international stage in the 2025 Belfast Tattoo.

== People associated with County Armagh ==
- Frank Aiken (1898–1983), born in County Armagh, Irish Republican, Irish Minister for External Affairs, Tánaiste
- Saint Benignus of Armagh, (died 467), first rector of the Cathedral School of Armagh and Bishop of Armagh
- Brian Boru (941–1014), buried in Armagh City, victor of Clontarf, High King of Ireland
- Sir Robert Hart (1835–1911), born in County Armagh, second Inspector-General of China's Imperial Maritime Customs Service (IMCS) from 1863 to 1911
- Arthur Hunter Palmer (1819–1898), born in County Armagh, 5th Premier of Queensland
- Tommy Makem (1932–2007), born in County Armagh, singer, musician, and songwriter, called "The Godfather of Irish Music"
- Seamus Mallon (1936–2020), born in County Armagh, first deputy First Minister of Northern Ireland
- Jim McAllister (1943–2013), born in Crossmaglen, County Armagh, politician and author
- John McCreesh, American politician who served in the Pennsylvania State Senate from 1935 to 1958 was born in Armagh County in 1881.
- Colin Morgan (born 1986), actor
- Paul Muldoon (born 1951), born in County Armagh, poet, winner of the Pulitzer Prize for Poetry and the T. S. Eliot Prize
- Andrew Nesbitt (born 1960), raised in Aughnagurgan, County Armagh, professional rally driver and winner of the 2000 and 2002 Irish Tarmac Rally Championship
- Tomás Ó Fiaich (1923–1990), born in County Armagh, Cardinal, Catholic Archbishop of Armagh and Primate of All Ireland 1977–90
- Eunan O'Neill (born 1982), born in County Armagh, journalist, RT TV network
- Sir William Olpherts (1822–1902), born in County Armagh, soldier and recipient of the Victoria Cross
- Ian Paisley (1926– 2014), born in County Armagh, clergyman, politician, second First Minister of Northern Ireland
- Saint Patrick (fifth century), first Bishop of Armagh
- Aileen Preston (1889–1974), born in County Armagh, chauffeur and suffragette in England
- George William Russell 'Æ' (1867–1919), born in County Armagh, author, critic and painter
- Robert Stewart, Viscount Castlereagh (1759–1822), educated in The Royal School, Armagh. British Foreign Secretary, Secretary for War, Leader of the United Kingdom House of Commons and Chief Secretary for Ireland
- Colin Turkington (born 1982), born in Portadown, County Armagh, professional racing driver and four-time British Touring Car champion.
- James Ussher (1581–1656), Church of Ireland Archbishop of Armagh and Primate of All Ireland 1625–1656
- Richard Wellesley, 1st Marquess Wellesley (1760–1842), educated in The Royal School, Armagh. Lord Lieutenant of Ireland and Governor General of India

== Places of interest ==
- Armagh Observatory, founded in 1790 & Armagh Planetarium, a modern working astronomical research institute with a rich heritage
- Armagh Public Library on Abbey Street in Armagh City, especially rich in 17th and 18th century English books, including Dean Jonathan Swift's own copy of the first edition of his Gulliver's Travels with his manuscript corrections
- Navan Fort, now a tree ring mound which once housed the rulers of Ulster with a modern interactive visitor centre
- Saint Patrick's Church of Ireland Cathedral, founded 445, seat of the Church of Ireland's Archbishop of Armagh, Primate of All Ireland, containing the grave of Brian Boru
- Saint Patrick's Roman Catholic Cathedral, commenced in 1838, seat of the Roman Catholic Archbishop of Armagh, Primate of All Ireland, stands on a hill and dominates the local countryside
- Gosford Castle, mock medieval 19th-century castle with substantial grounds
- Slieve Gullion, extinct volcano with crater lake, highest burial cairn in Ireland, views of 9 counties, a Mass rock, and a visitor centre at its foot

== Gallery ==
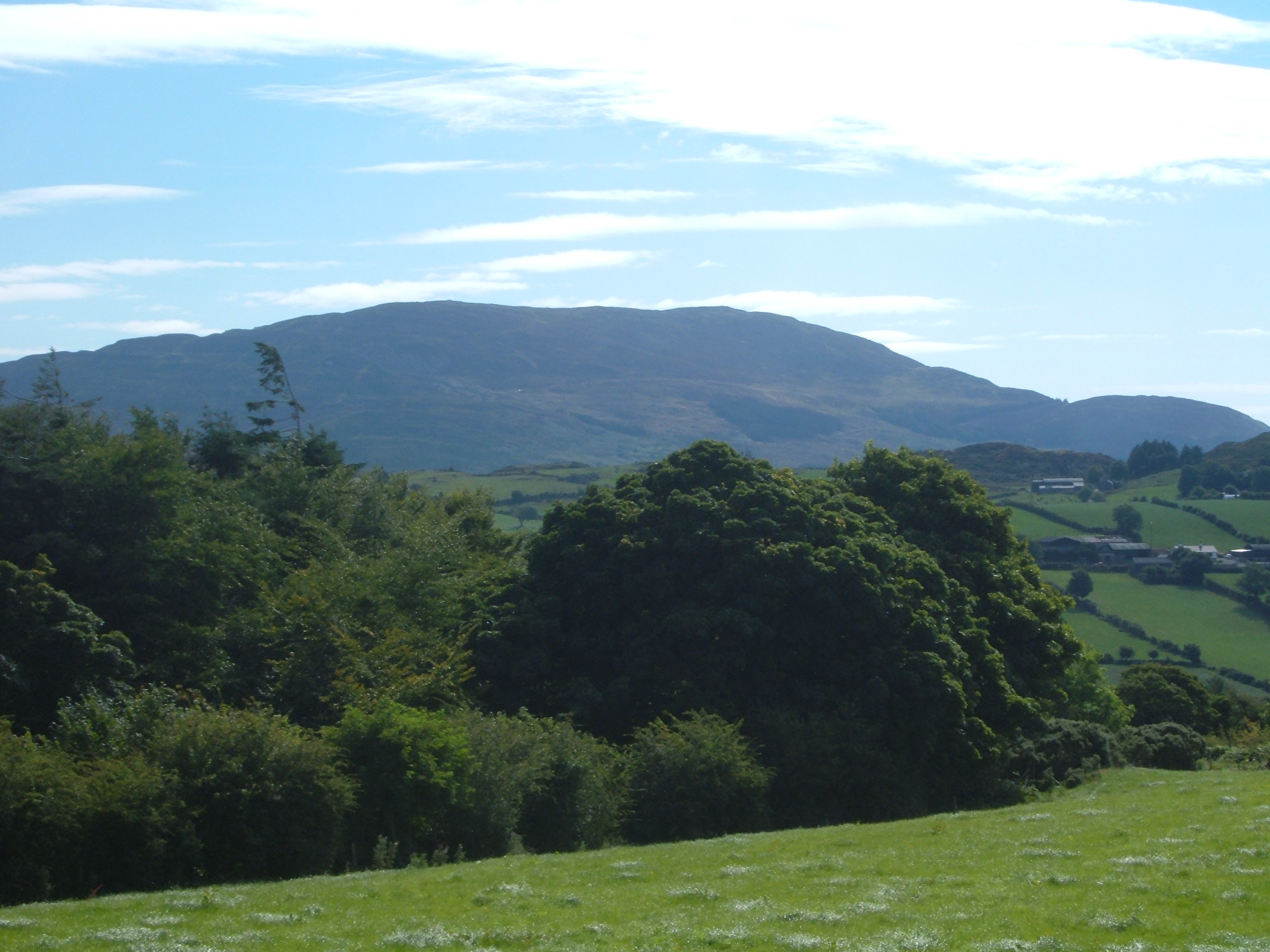
View of Slieve Gullion

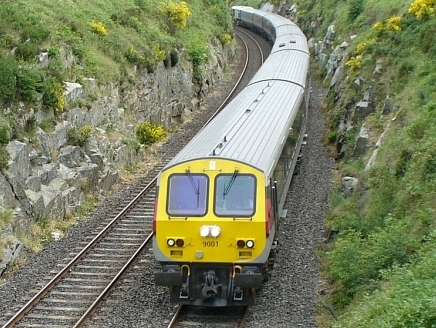
The Enterprise near Newry

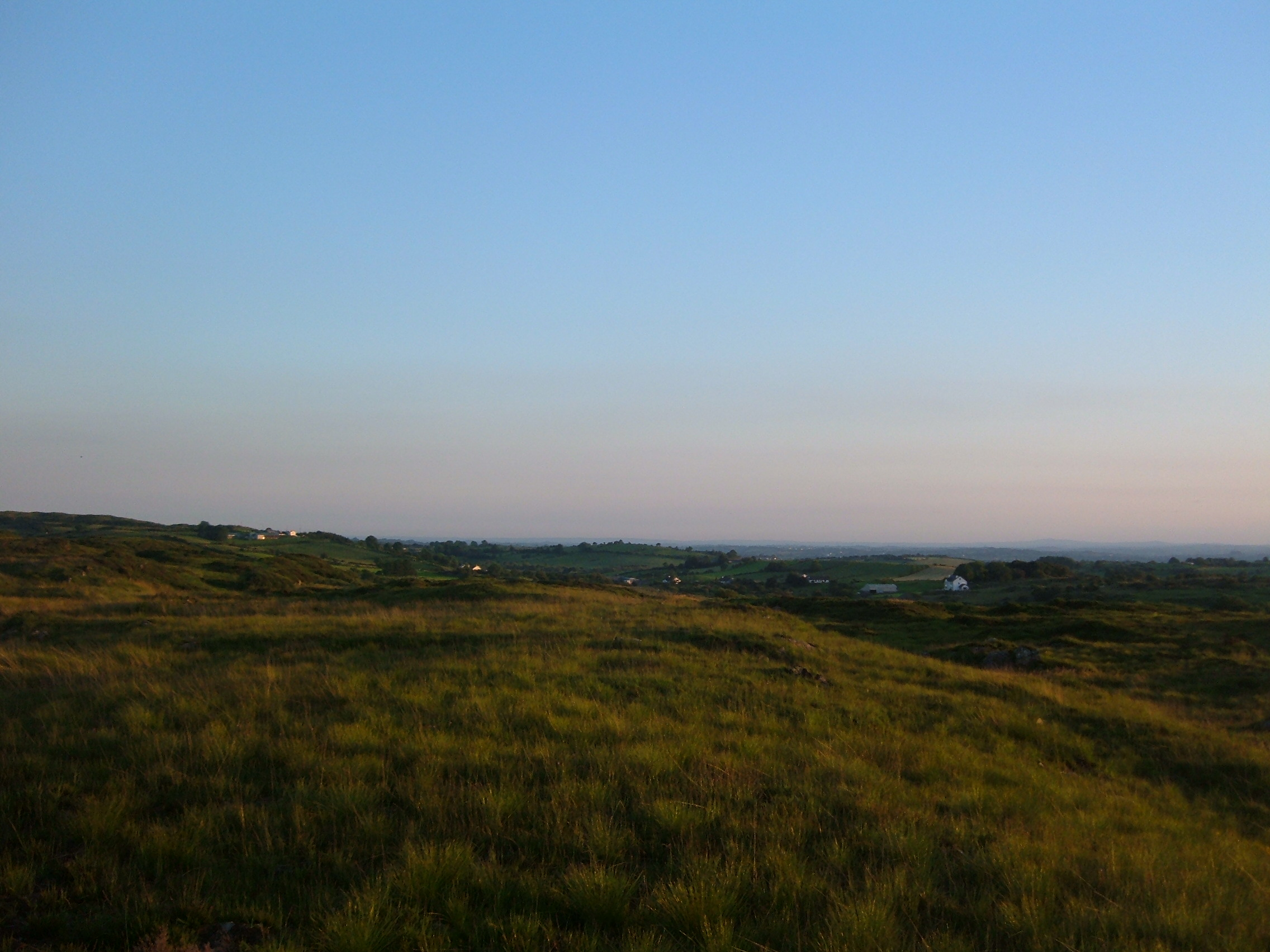
South Armagh Countryside

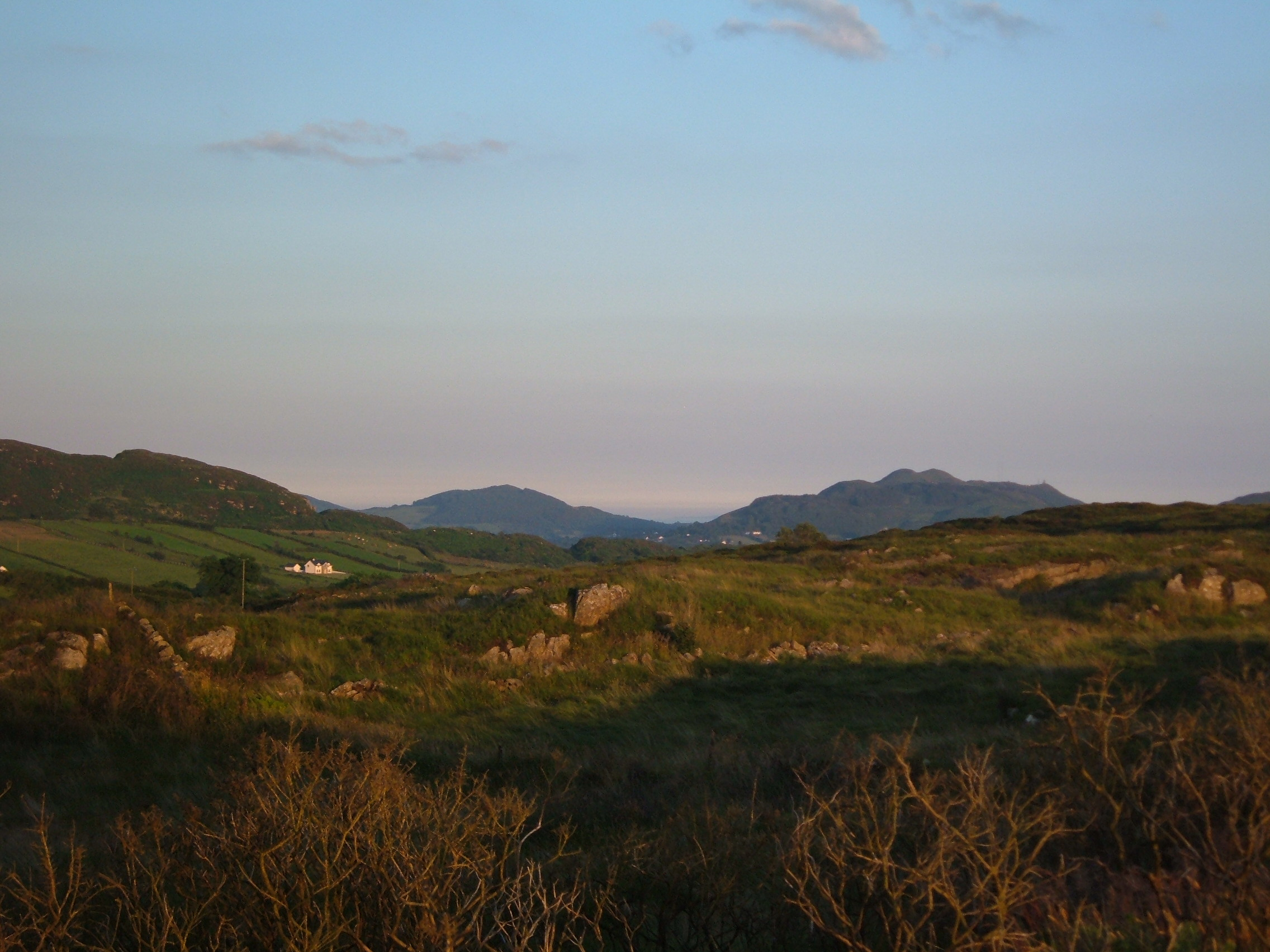
Forkhill Mountain

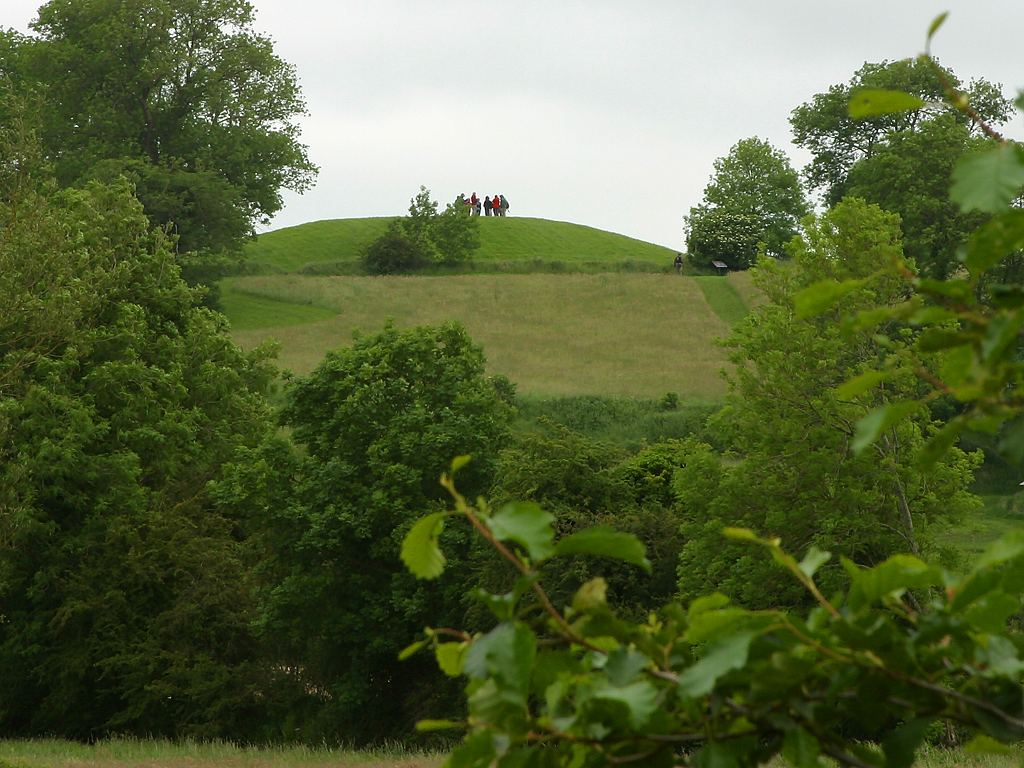
Emain Macha

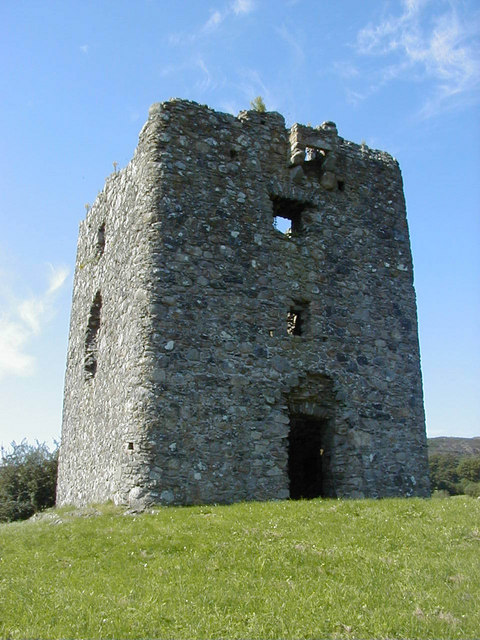
Moyry Castle

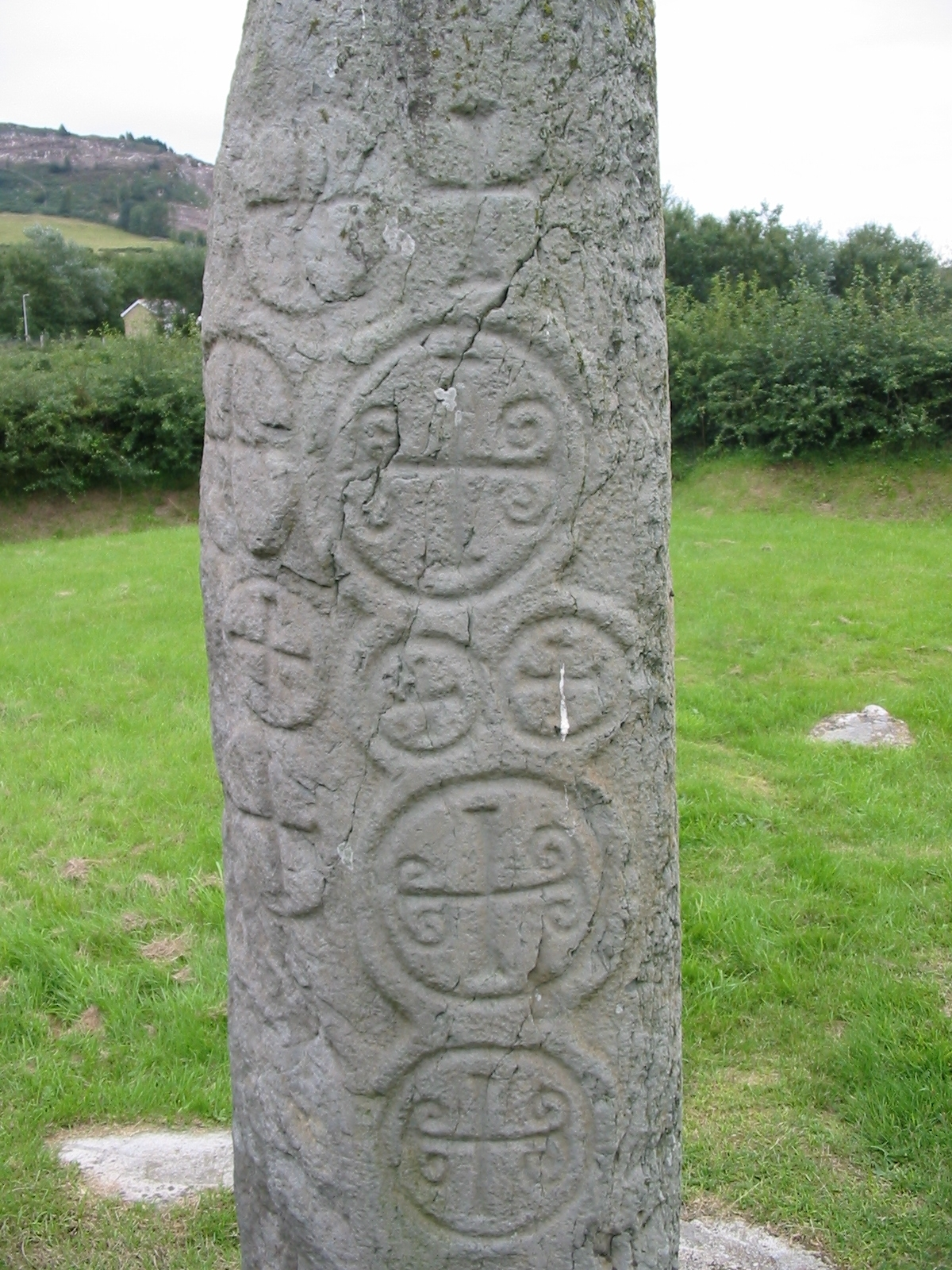
Killnasaggart Stone, 700 A.D.

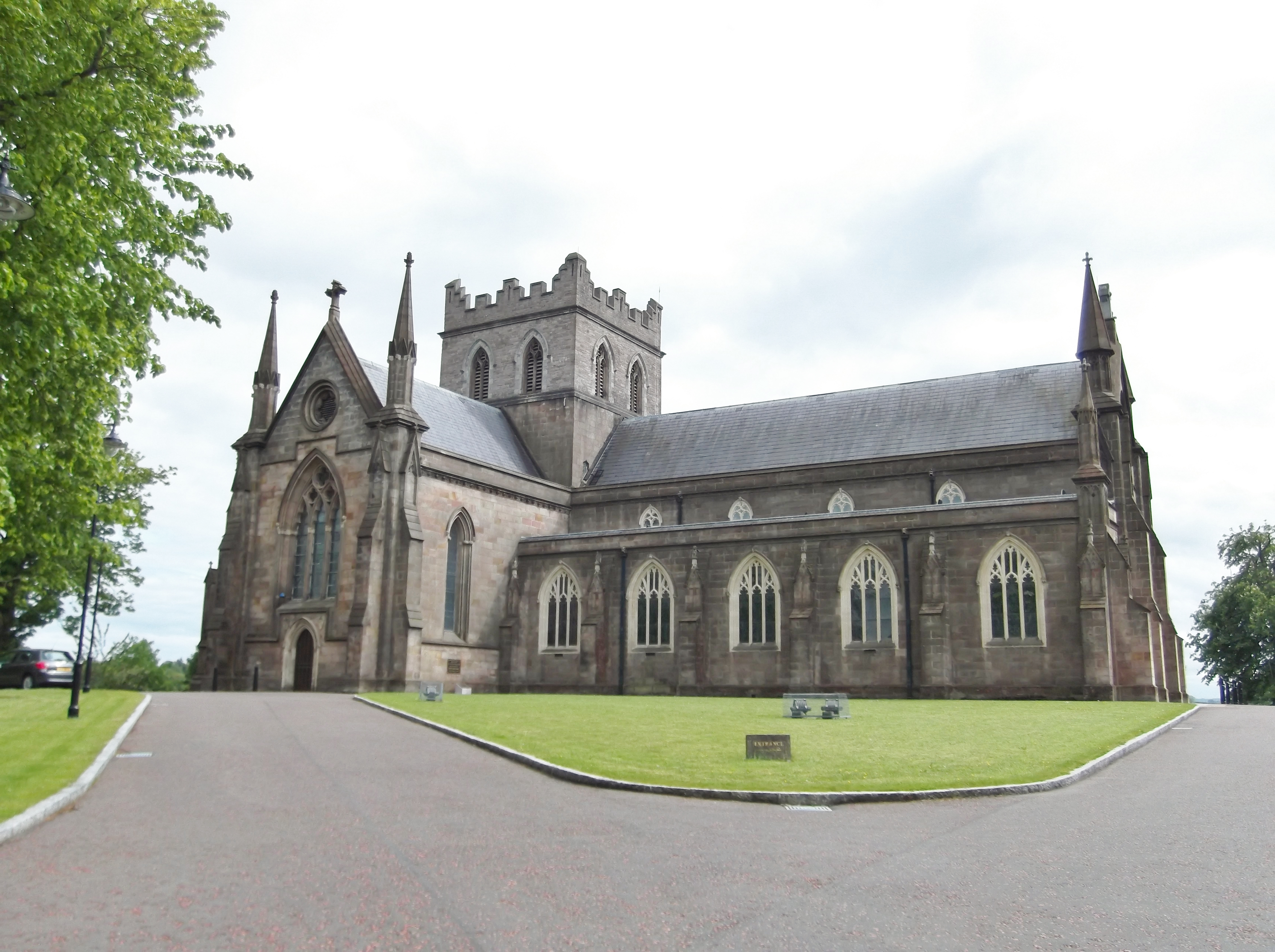
St. Patrick's Anglican Cathedral, est. 445

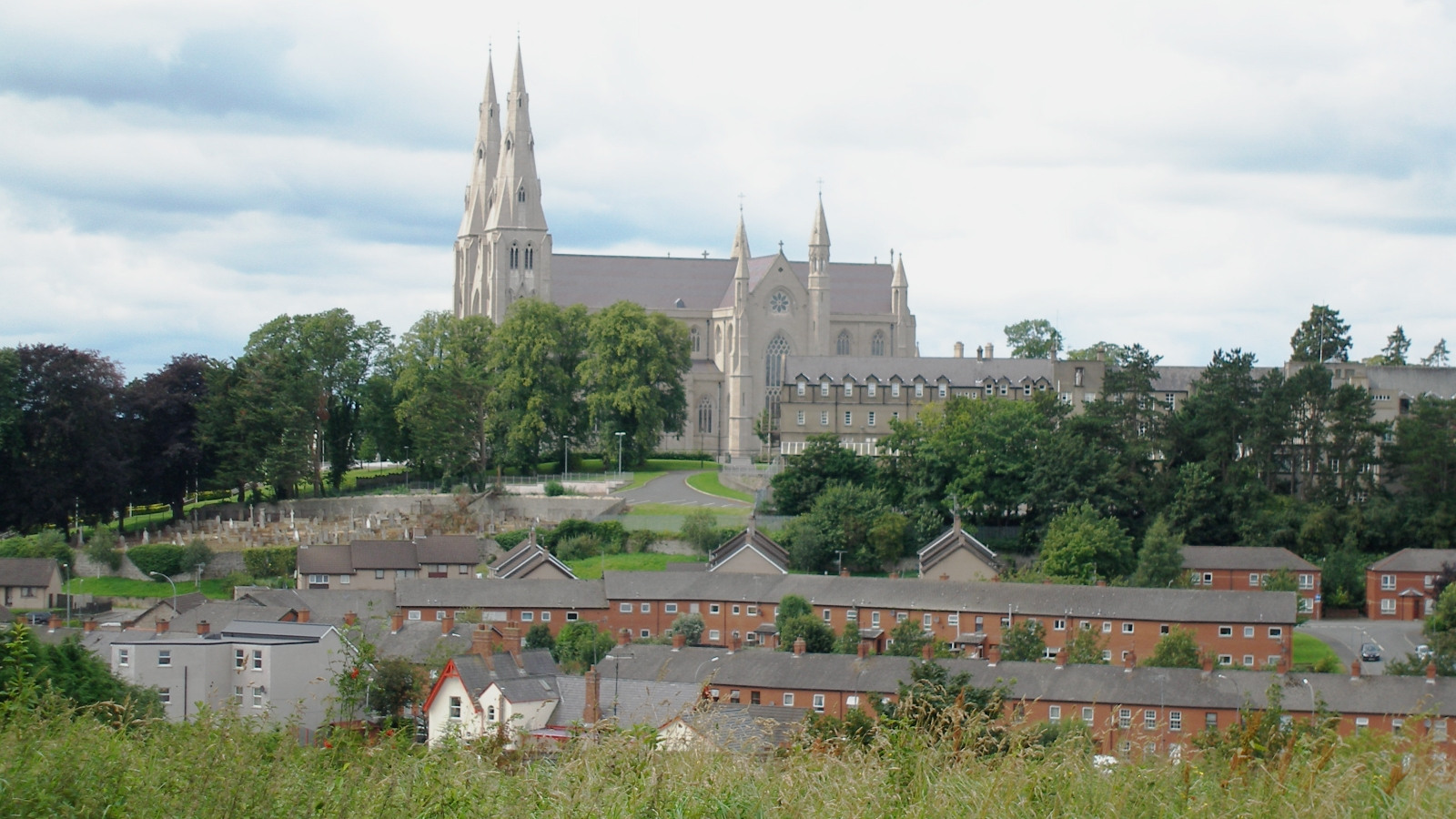
Armagh City

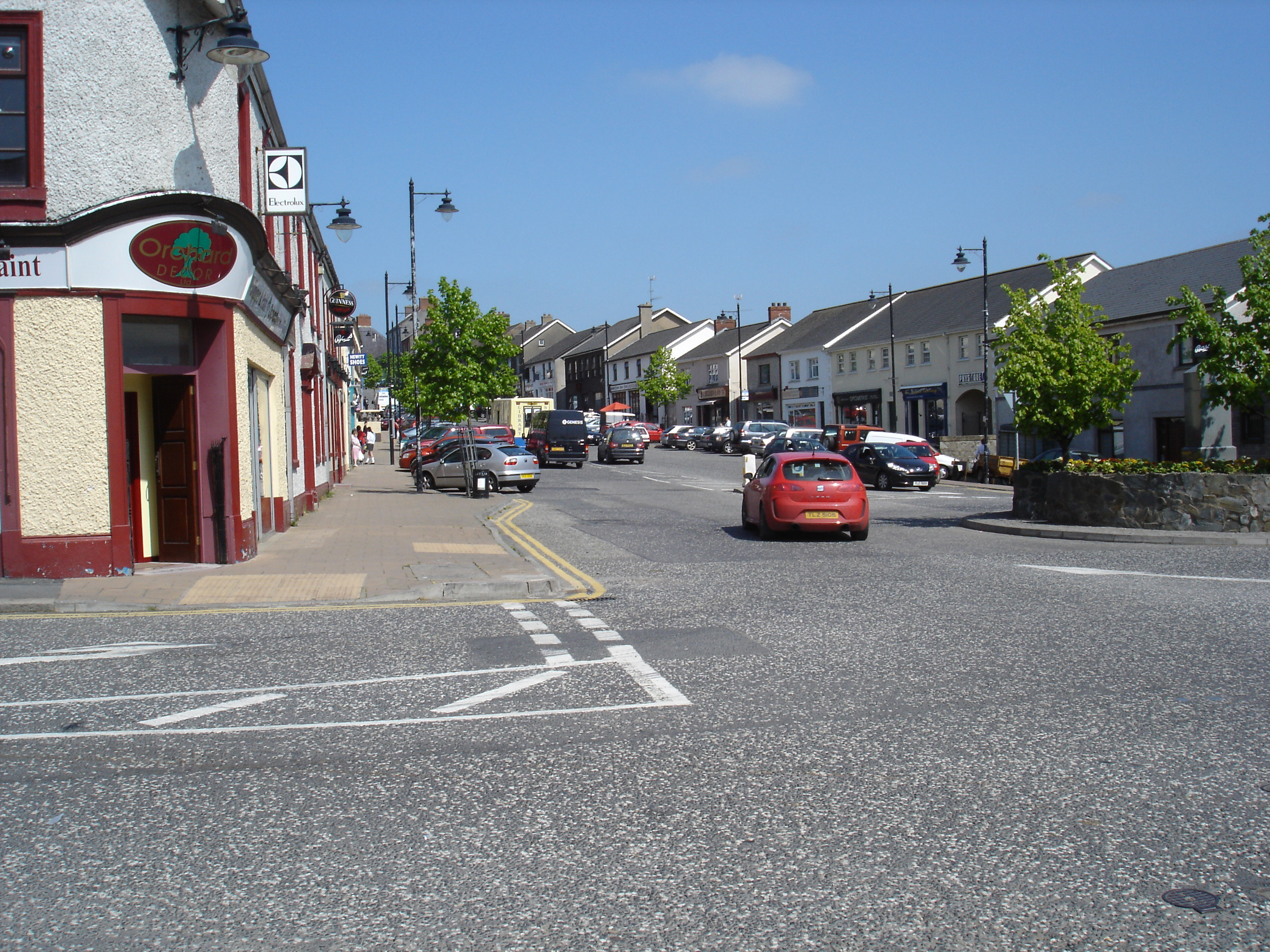
The small town of Markethill

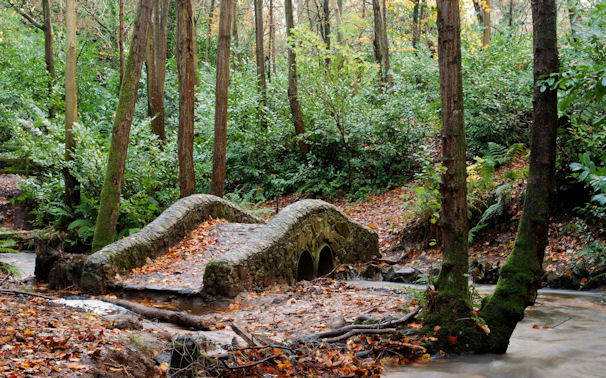
Clare Glen Forest, Tandragee

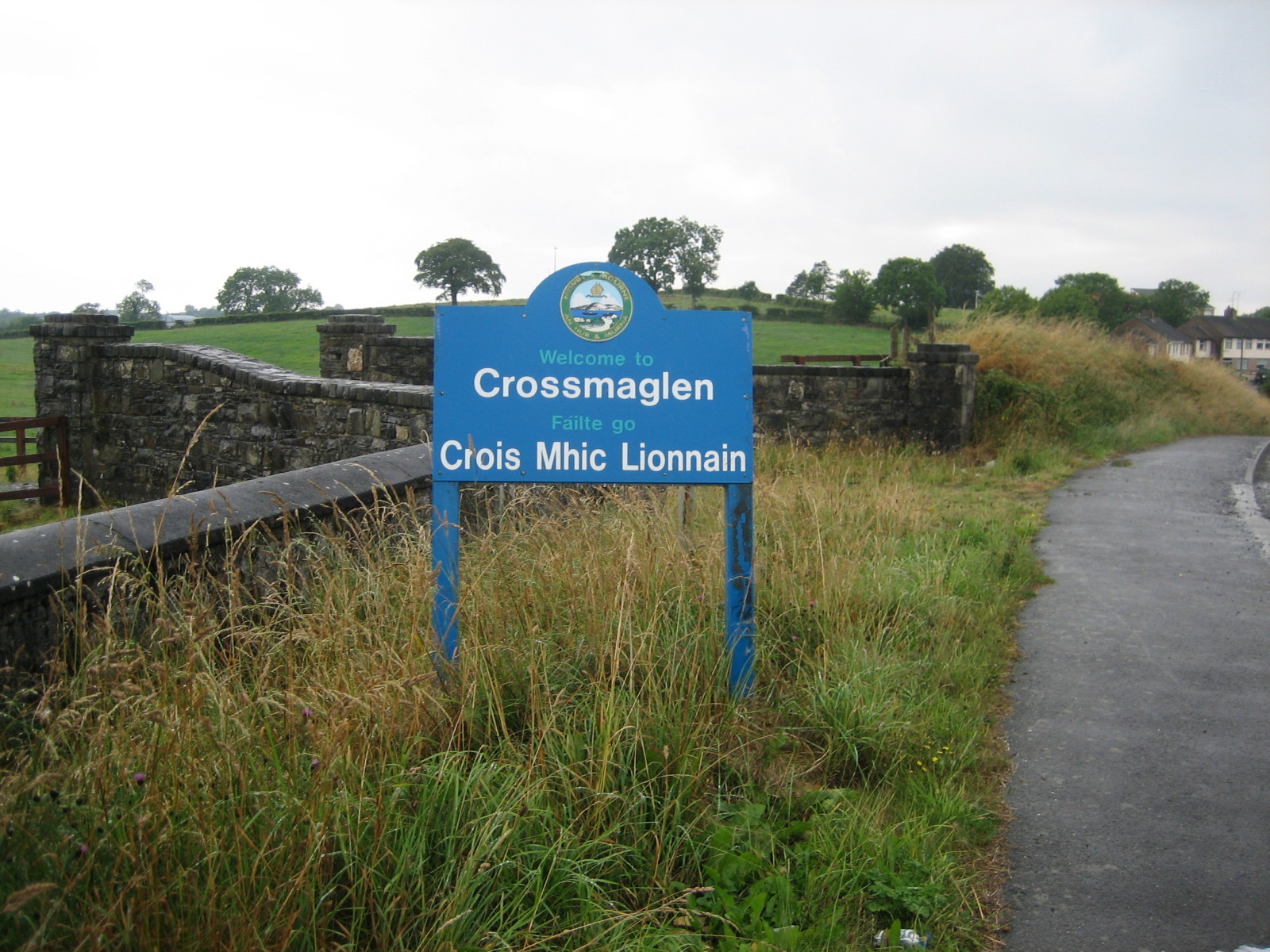
Approach to Crossmaglen

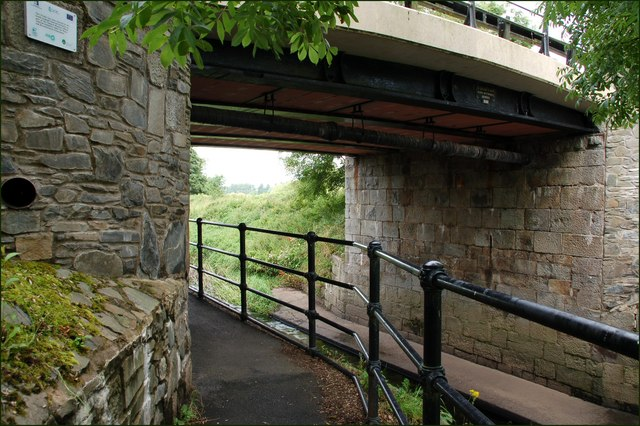
The Knock Bridge near Portadown on the Newry Canal

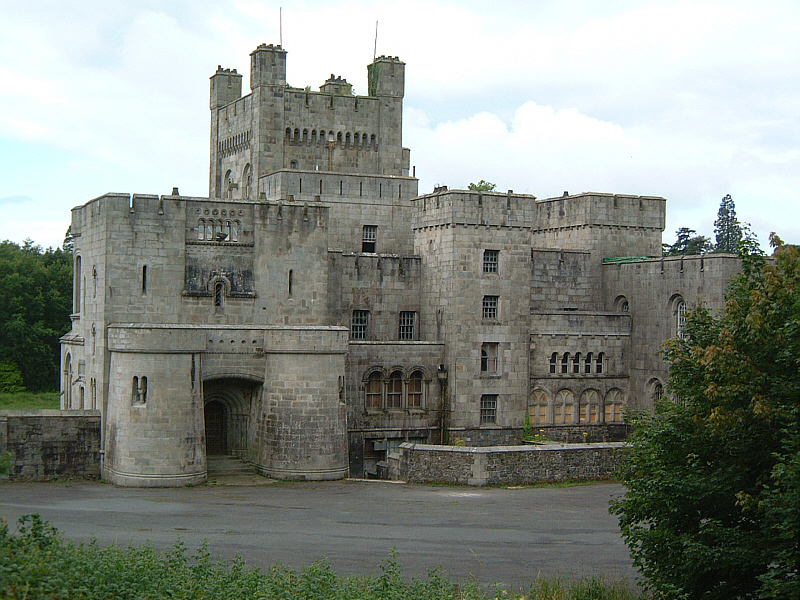
Gosford Castle, outside of Markethill

== See also ==
- Abbeys and priories in Northern Ireland (County Armagh)
- List of Irish counties by area
- List of Irish counties by population
- Lord Lieutenant of Armagh
- High Sheriff of Armagh
