= List of archaeological sites in County Armagh =

List of archaeological sites in County Armagh, Northern Ireland:

== A ==
- Aghayalloge, Dane's Cast, linear earthwork, grid ref: J056 214 to J060 208 and J0572 2118 to J0582 2099
- Aghmakane, Cashel and portal tomb: the Long Stones, grid ref: Cashel – J0206 2526, Portal tomb – J0204 2525
- Annagh, World War II Pillbox, grid ref: J0138 5241
- Aughadanove, Portal tomb: the Oul’ Grave, grid ref: H9991 2063
- Aughnagurgan, Megalithic tomb, grid ref: H8697 2861
- Aughnagurgan, Portal tomb, grid ref: H8704 2859

== B ==
- Ballard, Standing stone: the Long Stone, grid ref: J0162 2337
- Ballenan, Rath, grid ref: J0340 3697
- Ballinliss, Dane's Cast, linear earthwork, grid ref: J047 226 to J049 224
- Ballintemple, Church: Ballymoyer Old Church, grid ref: H9641 3077
- Ballyards, Enclosure, grid ref: H8647 4136
- Ballybrolly, Drumcoote, Navan, Tullyargle & Tyross, Votive site and find spot of four Iron Age horns: ‘Loughnashade’, grid ref: H8518 4540
- Ballydonaghy, World War II Pillbox, grid ref: J0438 5131
- Ballydoo, Enclosure, grid ref: H8246 4524
- Ballygorman, Rath, grid ref: J0207 3464
- Ballyheridan, Hengiform enclosure, grid ref: H8804 4300
- Ballymore, Rath: Forthill, grid ref: J0323 4743
- Ballytyrone, Rath, grid ref: H9149 5121
- Ballytyrone, Crannog in Lough Gall, grid ref: H9101 5150
- Balteagh, Large hilltop enclosure, grid ref: H7978 4038
- Bolton, Mound, grid ref: J0060 3542

== C ==
- Carnavanaghan, Passage tomb: Vicar's Cairn, grid ref: H9141 3974
- Carran, Standing stones (remains of megalithic tomb?), grid ref: H9080 1566
- Carrickananny, Souterrain, grid ref: H9919 2884
- Carrickastickan, Rath, grid ref: J0240 1468
- Carrickastickan, Rath, grid ref: J0155 1444
- Carrickastickan, Rath and souterrain, grid ref: J0237 1443
- Carrickastickan, Rath, grid ref: J0264 1400
- Carrickastickan, Round cairn, grid ref: J0238 1535
- Carrickbroad, Round cairn with cist: Cofracloghy, grid ref: J0383 1477
- Carrickbroad, Cashel and souterrain: Issacashel, grid ref: J0506 1468
- Carrickbroad, Rath, grid ref: J0408 1433
- Carrickcroppan, Cross-carved boulder, grid ref: J0333 2819
- Carrigans, Cashel, grid ref: H9761 1750
- Carrive, Cashel: McPartland's Fort, grid ref: H9774 1775
- Cashel, Cashel: the Relig, grid ref: H9036 3665
- Cashel, Rectangular earthwork: the Relig, grid ref: H9720 1943
- Castleraw, Castle and enclosure, grid ref: Area of H927 529
- Charlemont, Artillery fort: Charlemont Fort, grid ref: H8538 5578
- Clanrolla, Mound, grid ref: J0744 6266
- Cloghinny, Cross-carved boulder, grid ref: J0254 1767
- Clonlum, Court tomb: North Cairn (area surrounding the state care monument), grid ref: J0447 2136
- Clonlum, Round cairn with portal tomb: South Cairn (area surrounding the state care monument), grid ref: J0461 2063
- Clontygora, Megalithic tomb, grid ref: J0980 1974
- Clontygora, Megalithic tomb, grid ref: J0962 1834
- Coney Island, Prehistoric settlement, motte and tower: Coney Keep, grid ref: Area of H938 640
- Corfehan, Tynan Island Cross, grid ref: H7578 4168
- Corliss, Rath and souterrain: Corliss Fort, grid ref: H8928 1689
- Corporation (Armagh), Medieval dry-built masonry well, grid ref: H8772 4504
- Corporation (Armagh), Windmill stump, grid ref: H8701 4517
- Corran, Standing stone: the Grey Stone, grid ref: H9085 3524
- Corr and Dunvally, Rath and artillery bastion, grid ref: H8482 5524
- Crann, Rath, grid ref: H7725 2585
- Creevekeeran, Creevekeeran Castle, grid ref: H7847 3710
- Creeveroe, Crop-mark (Parallel linear ditches), grid ref: H8393 4477 to H8410 4527
- Crunagh, Rath, grid ref: H9770 3439

== D ==
- Dane's Cast (South), Linear earthwork visible at several points in the following townlands:
  - Aghayalloge, grid ref: J056 214 to J060 208 and J0572 2118 to J0582 2099
  - Ballinliss, grid ref: J047 226 to J049 224
  - Goragh, grid ref: J070 311 to J074 312
  - Seafin, grid ref: J052 220 to J056 214
- Dane's Cast (North), Linear earthwork visible at several points in the following townlands:
  - Killycapple, grid ref: H899 421 to H903 423
  - Killyfaddy, grid ref: H876 387 to J883 392
  - Latmacollum and Lisnadill, grid ref: H889 397 to H892 401
  - Lisnadill and Killyfaddy, grid ref: H883 392 to H889 397
- Doogary and Portnelligan, Crannog, grid ref: H7831 3862
- Dorsey and Tullynavall, Large earthwork and enclosure: the Dorsey Entrenchment and Standing Stone, grid ref: between H936 190 and H955 197
- Dorsy (Cavan O'Hanlon) or Roxborough, Multiple cist cairn: the Moate, grid ref: H9548 2175
- Drumacanver, Megalithic tomb, grid ref: H8077 3710
- Drumboy, Rath: Drumboy Fort, grid ref: H9029 1160
- Drumconwell, Rath, grid ref: H8734 4026
- Drumconwell, Rath, grid ref: H9770 4085
- Drumilly, Rath: Drumilly Fort, grid ref: J0099 2781
- Drummond, Rath, grid ref: H8057 3583
- Drumnasoo, Rath, grid ref: H9205 4831
- Dundrum, Multivallate rath: Gordon's Fort, grid ref: H8695 3496

== E ==
- Edenappa, Ecclesiastical site and bullaun (area surrounding the state monument: Kilnasaggart), grid ref: J0619 1490
- Edenderry, World War II Pillbox, grid ref: J0139 5457
- Ennislare, Rath, grid ref: H8646 4120
- Eshwary, Possible court tomb, grid ref: J0270 2867

== F ==
- Fairview or Mucklagh, Tynan Well Cross, grid ref: H7601 4288
- Fairview or Mucklagh, Tynan Terrace Cross, grid ref: H7597 4232
- Fergort, Rath, grid ref: H7883 3285
- Foughill Otra, Cashel, grid ref: J0639 1764

== G ==
- Glasdrumman, Crannog, grid ref: H9645 1470
- Goragh, Dane's Cast, linear earthwork, grid ref: J070 311 to J074 312
- Gosford Demesne, Rath: Greer's Fort, grid ref: H9720 4139

== H ==
- Hacknahay, World War II Pillbox, grid ref: J0401 5131
- Haughey's Fort, Large hilltop enclosure in Tray townland, grid ref: H8351 4529

== K ==
- Kennedies, Circular enclosure, grid ref: H7839 4355
- Kilcreevy Otra, Rath, grid ref: H8376 3848
- Killeen, Cashel: Lisdoo (area surrounding the state care monument), grid ref: J0815 2102
- Killeen, Cashel: Lisbanemore (area surrounding the state care monument), grid ref: J0782 2013
- Killycapple, Dane's Cast, linear earthwork, grid ref: H899 421 to H903 423
- Killyfaddy, Dane's Cast, linear earthwork, grid ref: H876 387 to J883 392
- Killyfaddy and Lisnadill, Dane's Cast, linear earthwork, grid ref: H883 392 to H889 397
- Kilmore, Platform rath, grid ref: H8621 5121
- Kiltybane or Lisleitrim, Multivallate rath, grid ref: H9035 2072
- Kiltybane or Lisleitrim, Crannog in Lisleitrim Lough, grid ref: H8983 2042
- King's Stables, Earthwork in Tray townland, grid ref: H8388 4546
- Knock, World War II Pillbox, grid ref: J0413 5124

== L ==
- Latbirget, Megalithic tomb: Giant's Grave, grid ref: H9939 2162
- Latmacollum and Lisnadill, Dane's Cast, linear earthwork, grid ref: H889 397 to H892 401
- Levalleglish, Church: Loughgall, grid ref: H9078 5214
- Lisadian, Rath, grid ref: J0094 3156
- Lisadian, Rath, grid ref: J0177 3137
- Lisamry, Rath: Lisamry Fort, grid ref: J8863 1490
- Lisbane, Multivallate rath: Lisbane, grid ref: J0398 4440
- Lisbanoe, Large enclosure, grid ref: H8552 4234
- Lisdrumchor Lower, Rath, grid ref: H9810 3432
- Lisdrumchor Upper, Rath, grid ref: H9775 3310
- Lisglynn, Rath: Lisglyn, grid ref: H8106 3915
- Liskyborough, Rath, H9310 4757
- Lisloony, Bivallate rath, grid ref: H7762 4231
- Lisnadill and Killyfaddy, Dane's Cast, linear earthwork, grid ref: H883 392 to H889 397
- Lisnadill and Latmacollum, Dane's Cast, linear earthwork, grid ref: H889 397 to H892 401
- Lisnamintry, Bivallate rath (area surrounding the state care monument), grid ref: J0462 5445
- Lisraw, Rath: Lisraw Fort, grid ref: J0444 4043
- Lissaraw, Rath: Lissaraw Fort, grid ref: J0222 2796
- Lisslanly, Rath, grid ref: H7825 3782
- Lissummon, Rath, grid ref: J0445 3459
- Longstone, Standing stone: the Longstone, grid ref: H8788 4656

== M ==
- Maghery (Derrywarragh Island), Tower and enclosure: the O’Connor Stronghold, grid ref: H9299 6425 and area
- Maghnavery, Rath, grid ref: H9872 3793
- Manooney, Mound, grid ref: H7852 4466
- Mountnorris, Rath and artillery fort, grid ref: H9952 3617
- Mullaghbane, Graveyard enclosure: Kilnacrue, grid ref: H9875 1920
- Mullaghglass, Rath, grid ref: J0640 2869
- Mullaghglass, Rath, grid ref: J0552 2870
- Mullaghglass, Standing stone, grid ref: J0558 2862

== N ==
- Newry Canal: Canal visible at several points in the following townlands:
  - Reach 1 (a): Cloghoge, Fathom Lower, Fathom Upper, grid ref: J1091 2071 to J0848 2594
  - Reach 2: Lisdrumgullion, grid ref: J0874 2743 to J0848 2806
  - Reach 3: Lisdrumgullion, grid ref: J0848 2806 to J0773 2869
  - Reach 4: Carnbane, Lisdrumgullion, grid ref: J0773 2869 to J0749 2936
  - Reach 5: Carnbane, Goragh, grid ref: J0749 2936 to J0742 3087
  - Reach 6: Goragh, Kilmonaghan, grid ref: J0742 3087 to J0676 3230
  - Reach 7: Kilmonaghan, Kilrea, Knockduff, grid ref: J0676 3230 to J0616 3433
  - Reach 8: Demoan, Drumbanagher, Killybodagh, grid ref: J0616 3433 to J0648 3678
  - Reach 9: Aughantaraghan, Demoan, grid ref: J0648 3678 to J0675 3833
  - Reach 10: Aughantaraghan, Federnagh, Tullynacross, grid ref: J0675 3833 to J0613 3928
  - Reach 11: Aughlish, Brannock, Druminargal, Federnagh, Monclone, Terryhoogan, Tullynacross, grid ref: J0613 3928 to J0638 4504
  - Reach 12: Terryhoogan, grid ref: J0638 4504 to J0631 4536
  - Reach 13: Brackagh, Cargans, Mullahead, Terryhoogan, Tullyhugh, grid ref: J0631 4536 to J0314 5117
  - Reach 14: Brackagh, grid ref: J0314 5117 to J0220 5246

== R ==
- Rathconvil, Rath, grid ref: J0212 3840
- Rathdrumgran, Rath, grid ref: H9238 4634
- Rathtrillick, Multivallate rath, grid ref: H7575 3795
- Rawes, Rath: Rawes Fort, grid ref: H7927 3492
- Rockmacreeny, Rath: Rockmacreeny Fort, grid ref: H9354 4635
- Rockmacreeny, Rath: Thorny Fort, grid ref: H9351 4580

== S ==
- Seafin, Dane's Cast, linear earthwork, grid ref: J052 220 to J056 214
- Shean, Hilltop enclosure: Carrickinaffrin, grid ref: J0040 1523

== T ==
- Tamlaght, Burial mound, grid ref: H8073 3894
- Tannyoky, Rath, grid ref: J0334 3905
- Tirgarriff, Mound, grid ref: H8439 4556
- Tray: Large hilltop enclosure: Haughey's Fort, grid ref: H8351 4529
- Tray: Earthwork: the King's Stables, grid ref: H8388 4546
- Tray: Ring-ditches (6), grid ref: Area of H838 458
- Tullyard, Mound, grid ref: H8747 4765
- Tullyard, Rath: Tullyard Fort, grid ref: H8866 1652
- Tullybrick (Hamilton), Barrow, grid ref: H7528 3953
- Tullydonnell (Gage), Rath, grid ref: H9903 1456
- Tullydonnell (Gage) and Ballynaclosha, Rath, grid ref: H9895 1420
- Tullyglush, Rath, grid ref: H7928 3752
- Tullyglush, Bivallate rath: Devlin's Fort, grid ref: H8660 3442
- Tullymore, Cairn or barrow: Niall's or O’Neill's Mound, grid ref: H8618 4414
- Tullyvallan, Round cairn: Harry Mount, grid ref: H9140 2317
- Tullyvallan (Tipping) West, Cross-carved stone, grid ref: H9274 2333
- Tullyvallan (Tipping) West, Standing stone, grid ref: H9233 2285
- Tynan, Barrow, grid ref: H7715 4206
