= Clare, County Armagh =

Coordinates: 54.32534°N 6.44671°W

Clare
- Village
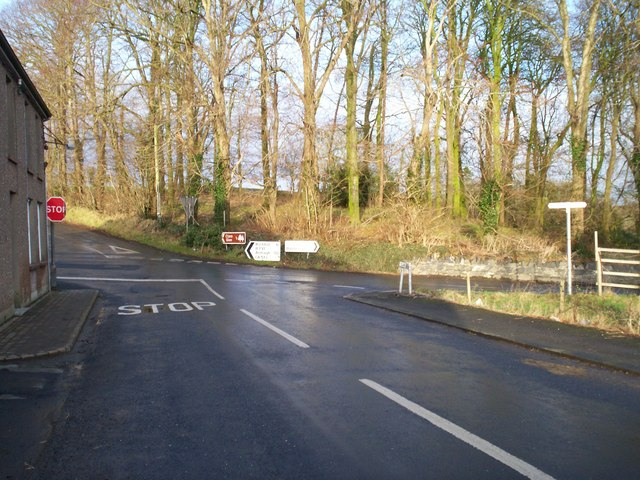
- Clare Crossroads (2008)

- Location within Northern Ireland
  - Belfast: 28
- District: Armagh, Banbridge and Craigavon
- County: County Armagh
- Country: Northern Ireland
- Sovereign state: United Kingdom
- Post town: CRAIGAVON
- Postcode district: BT62
- Dialling code: 028
- Police: Northern Ireland
- Fire: Northern Ireland
- Ambulance: Northern Ireland
- UK Parliament: Newry & Armagh
- NI Assembly: Newry & Armagh

Clare (from An Clár, meaning 'the plank bridge') is a village situated on the Cusher River, two miles southwest from Tandragee, in County Armagh, Northern Ireland. The townland of Clare consists of 406 acres within the civil parish of Ballymore and the historic barony of Orior Lower.

== History ==
The area around Clare was historically associated with the O'Neill family. In the early 17th century the lands in the area were confiscated, from Hugh O'Neill, Earl of Tyrone by James I of England, and granted to Michael Harrison. The Irish Rebellion of 1641 impacted the area, and much of Clare village was destroyed. Patrick oge McRoorey O'Hanlon and his rebels also executed a number of Protestant settlers who were living in Clare. The Earl of Bathe's Castle, now known as Clare Castle, was set ablaze after being taken by surprise by the O'Hanlons.

=== Clare Volunteers ===
In the late 18th century, in response to potential French invasion of Ireland, private militia groups were formed throughout Ireland. These predominantly Protestant groups included a number of companies of Irish Volunteers in Ulster. One such company, the Clare Volunteers, was founded in Clare in 1779 under the leadership of Captain Thomas Dawson, Member of Parliament. He was joined by lieutenants Alexander Patton and the Reverend Samuel Livingstone. The Clare Volunteers, consisting of 50 armed members, wore red and black uniforms.

==== Home Rule crisis ====
The Unionist Club movement, which initially emerged in 1893 to resist the Second Home Rule Bill, experienced a resurgence in 1910. Branches were established in Tandragee, Clare, Scarva, Poyntzpass, and Ballyshiel. After the Ulster Covenant, the Unionist leadership opted to unite the various organisations involved in drilling efforts. By December 1912, the County Armagh Committee included several figures from the business sector, the legal field, and the local aristocracy. These people played a role in the eventual formation of a local battalion of the Ulster Volunteers, the Third Battalion of the County Armagh Regiment U.V.F.

The Clare Company became part of the Third Battalion of the County Armagh Regiment U.V.F.; The initial area returns from October 1914 recorded 73 men from Ahorey, 69 from Clare, 50 from Lisavague, 18 from Manordocherty, 46 from Tyrones Ditches, 13 from Poyntzpass, 92 from Scarva, 90 from Tandragee, and 31 from Laurelvale. The Rev. R.J. Whan and R.J. Harden were involved with the Clare Company, with Harden's grounds at Harrybrook being used for military exercises. On 14 January 1914, an inspection of the Tandragee, Clare, Ahorey, Laurelvale, Cornascriebe, and Teemore Volunteers took place at Harrybrook, with attendance ranging from 200 to 300. The inspection was conducted by Regimental Commander Stewart Blacker.

== Clare Glen ==
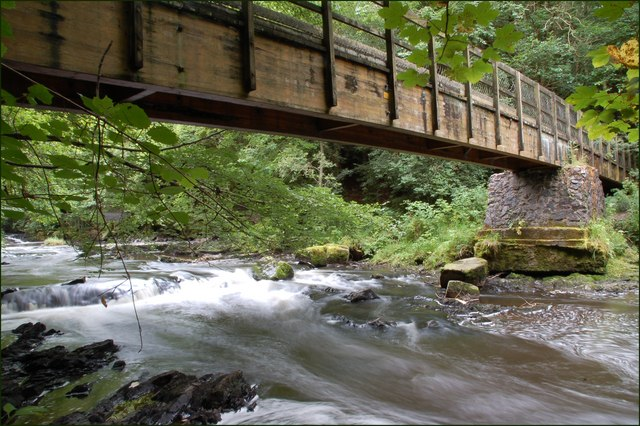
Clare Glen footbridge (2007)

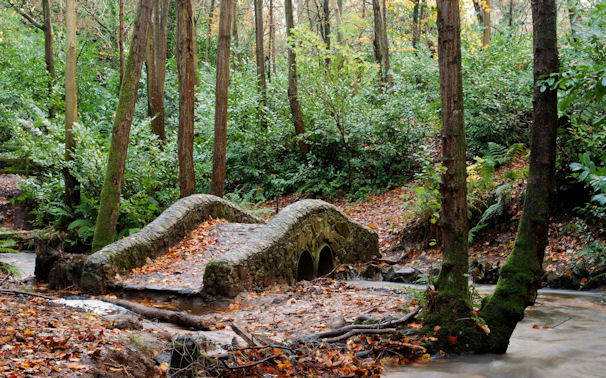
Clare Glen stone bridge (2009)

Clare Glen is a 55-acre forested area that is traversed by the Cusher River. It features a 2.2-mile trail that follows the riverbank. Trees in the forest include hazel, oak, ash, and wych elm. The flora also include an undergrowth of wood anemone, wild garlic, and bluebells, along with various orchid species. The area contains several stone bridges, including a wooden bridge that spans the river at the centre of Clare Glen. The site also includes a caravan park with 25 bays.

== Orange halls ==
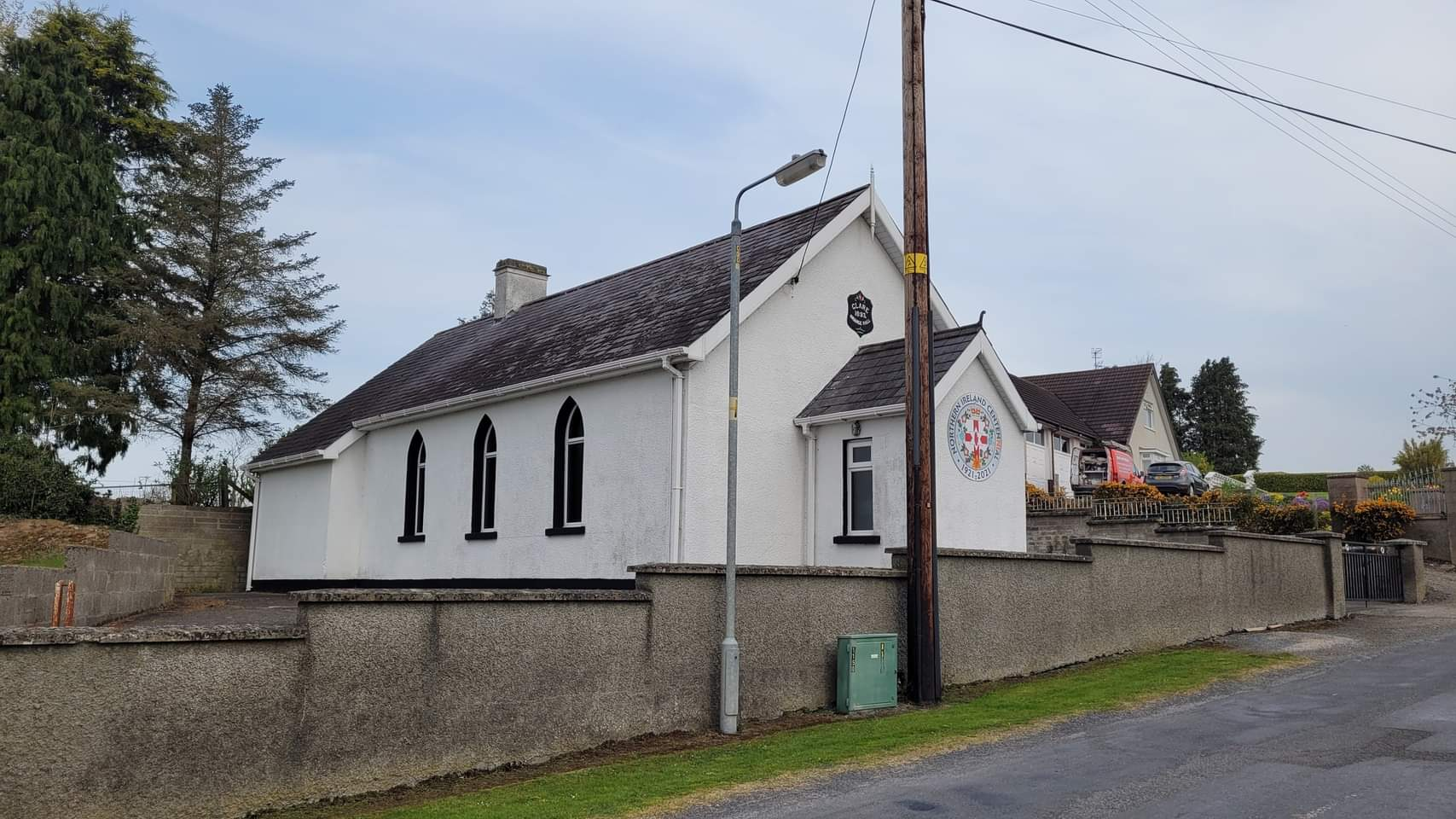
Clare Orange Hall (2022)

Clare has a central Orange Hall located in the village, as well as several others located on the outskirts of the area, such as Moyrourkan Orange Hall and Mavemacullen Orange Hall.

The Orange Hall in the village dates from 1893 and is still well maintained in the 21st century. This hall hosts Clare Conquering Heroes LOL 102, Clare's Orange Lodge.

The lodge organises an annual event known as 'Lundy Night' each August, which includes a parade that begins at the Orange Hall, proceeds through the village, and finishes in a field where an effigy of Robert Lundy is set alight.

== Churches ==
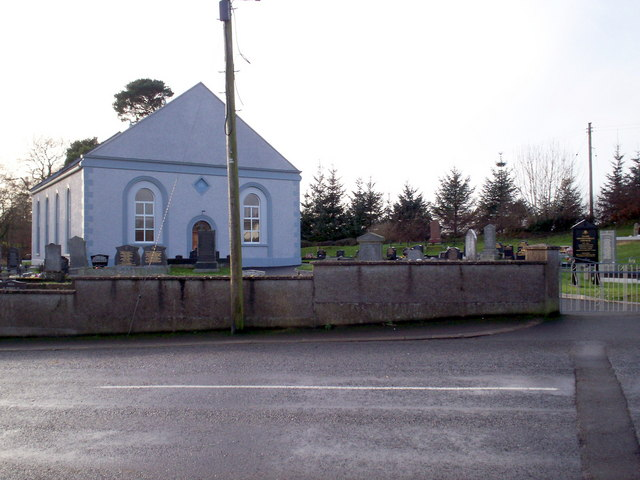
Clare Presbyterian Church (2008)

Clare has three churches, Clare Presbyterian Church, Clare Parish Church and Clare Reformed Presbyterian Church.

=== Clare Presbyterian Church ===
Clare's Presbyterian church, founded in 1633, is one of the oldest Presbyterian churches in Northern Ireland. In the 1700s, the congregation comprised approximately 300 to 400 families. Records from the early 19th century indicate that seat-holders included members who journeyed from relatively distant locations such as Poyntzpass, Marlacoo, Cornascriebe, and Ballynewry. However, the emergence of other congregations like Ahorey, Cremore, and Tandragee offered more accessible options for families making the lengthy trek to Clare on foot.

The current Presbyterian meeting house represents the fourth structure in Clare's history. The original church was destroyed during the turmoil of the 1641 Irish Rebellion. The second building endured for approximately 30 to 40 years, while the third remained standing for a century and a half. The third building featured a three-aisle design, which was a favoured architectural style of its era due to its simplicity and cost-effectiveness. Church records indicate that, in its later years, the structure was in significant disrepair, with an estimated cost of £750 for a new building. The existing structure was completed in 1828, with renovations of the interior taking place in 2013.

=== Clare Parish Church ===
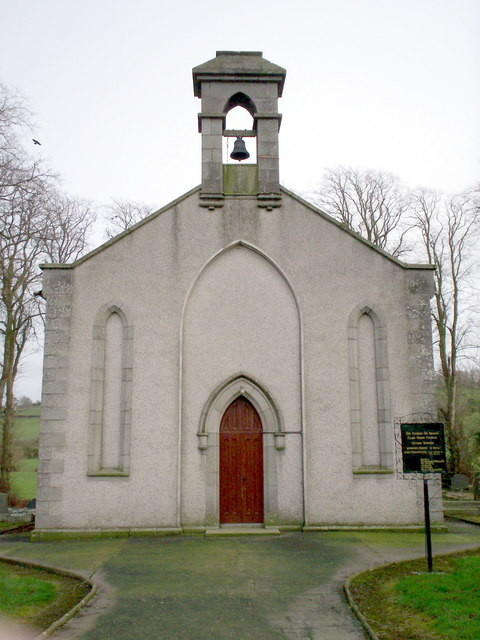
Clare Parish Church (2008)

Clare Parish Church was built in 1840, accompanied by two smaller buildings: a school and a caretaker's house, with an outhouse added subsequently. This stone outhouse, featuring a tin roof, initially housed a dry bucket and has largely retained its original form, without running water, into the 21st century.

== Education ==
Clare village has one school, Clare Primary School.
