= Moyrourkan =

- Townland
- Area: 0.62 sq mi (1.6 km^{2})
- County: Armagh
- Country: Northern Ireland
- Sovereign state: United Kingdom
- Post town: CRAIGAVON
- Postcode district: BT62
- Dialling code: 028

Moyrourkan is a townland of 395 acres (1.60 km^{2}; 0.617 sq mi) in County Armagh, Northern Ireland. It is situated in the civil parish of Mullaghbrack, in the historic barony of Orior Lower. It is the 223rd largest townland in County Armagh.

Moyrourkan is bordered by Drumart townland to the north, Clare to the east, Drumnamether to the west, and to the south are Mavemacullen and Shanecrackan Beg.

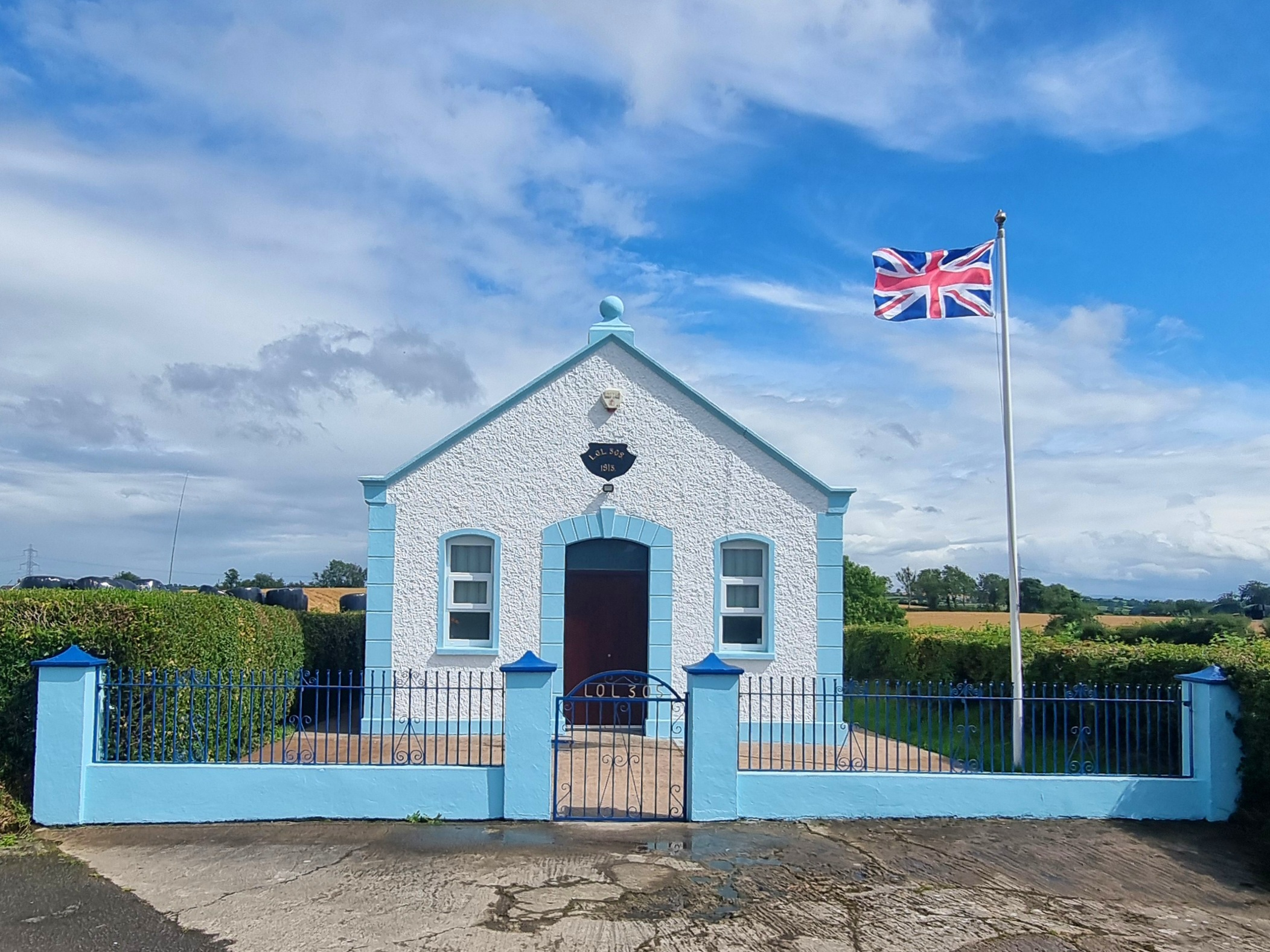
Moyrourkan Orange Hall is located, just outside Moyrourkan townland, in Drumnamether

== Moyrourkan Orange Hall ==
Despite its name, Moyrourkan Orange Hall is in the neighbouring townland of Drumnamether.

Moyrourkan True Blues LOL 305 and Moyrourkan True Blues Junior LOL 144 are based at the hall, where they hold monthly lodge meetings. The Moyrourkan True Blues Flute Band, founded in 1976 and due to be reformed in 2026, is also based at the hall.

== Moyrourkan Lough ==
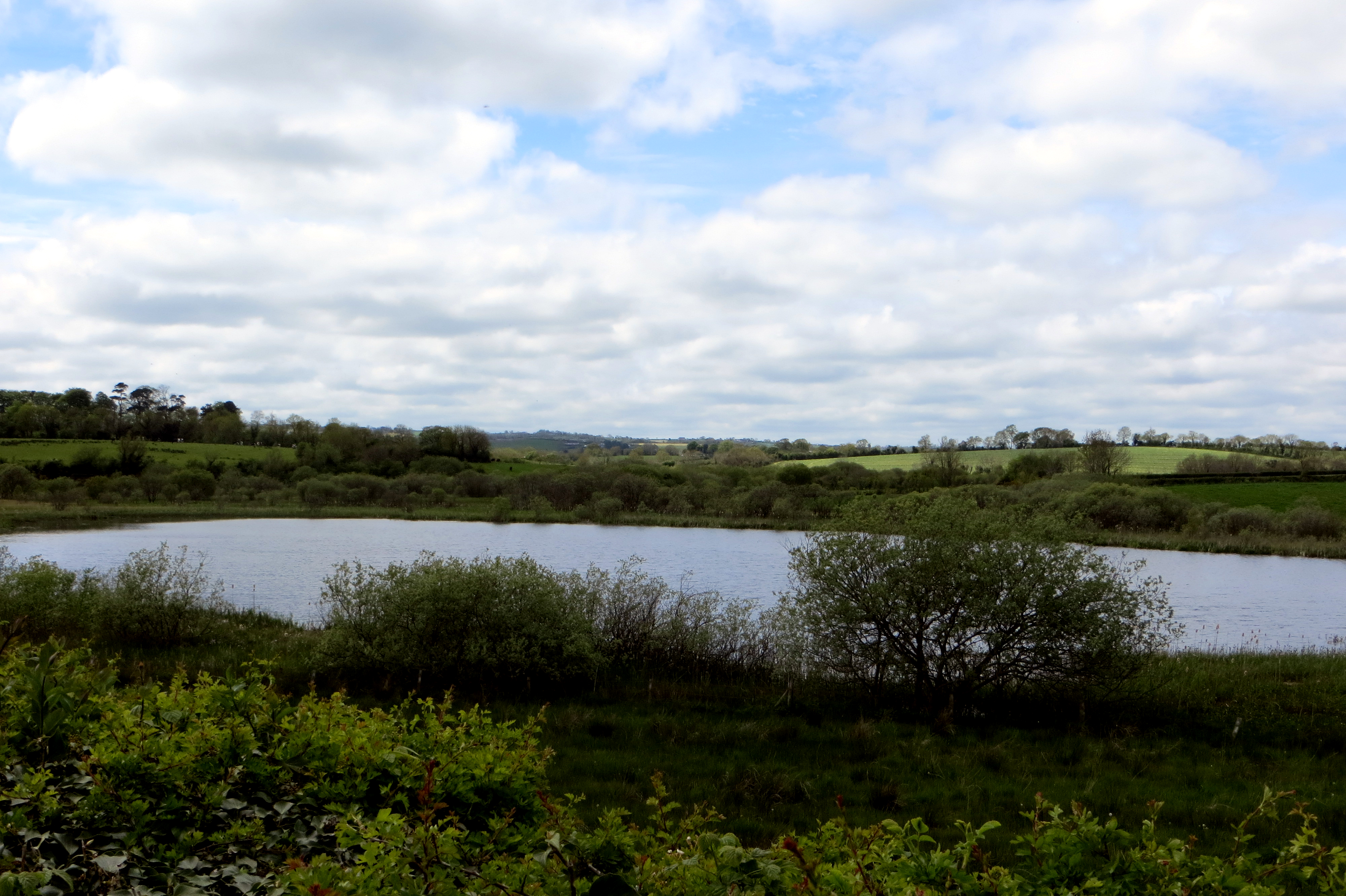
Moyrourkan Lough

Moyrourkan Lough is an Area of Special Scientific Interest (ASSI) in County Armagh. It is a wetland made up of open water, fen, swamp, and woodland. The lakes contain pondweed and yellow water-lily, with fens around them featuring bottle sedge, bogbean, and water horsetail. Plants such as cowbane, greater tussock-sedge, and several Sphagnum mosses are found here. The area also supports invertebrates like the water beetle Dytiscus circumcinctus, a species linked to older fen habitats now rare in Northern Ireland.

Historically, it was referenced in the 1838 Ordnance Survey Memoirs as situated two miles north east of Markethill, spanning across four townlands and rising approximately 254 feet above sea level. At that time, it was estimated to be about three quarters of a mile in length and 220 yards in width.

== Archaeology ==
There are three ringforts in Moyrourkan townland, including examples in the:

- eastern area of Moyrourkan which measures 33.5 meters from north to south and 41 meters from east to west. This ringfort has an irregular oval platform with one side significantly elevated to form a level interior.
- centre of the townland which measures 48 meters from north to south and 51 meters from east to west. This site has been altered due to enclosures and subsequent agricultural activities.
- southwestern area of Moyrourkan which is 46.5 meters from north to south and 42 meters from east to west. While the northern and southern sections of this rath are well-preserved, the eastern perimeter has been flattened and a portion of the western side has collapsed.

== See also ==
- List of townlands of County Armagh
