= Skegatillida =

Townland (land division) in Northern Ireland

Skegatillida: Irish: Sceitheog an tSeilide
- County: Armagh
- Country: Northern Ireland
- Sovereign state: United Kingdom
- Postcode district: BT35
- Dialling code: 028

Skegatillida (from Irish Sceitheog an tSeilide, meaning 'thorn of the snail') is a townland of 222 acres in County Armagh, Northern Ireland. It is situated in the civil parish of Ballymore and the historic barony of Orior Lower.

== See also ==
- List of townlands in County Armagh
