= Ballyargan =

Ballyargan: Irish: Baile argain
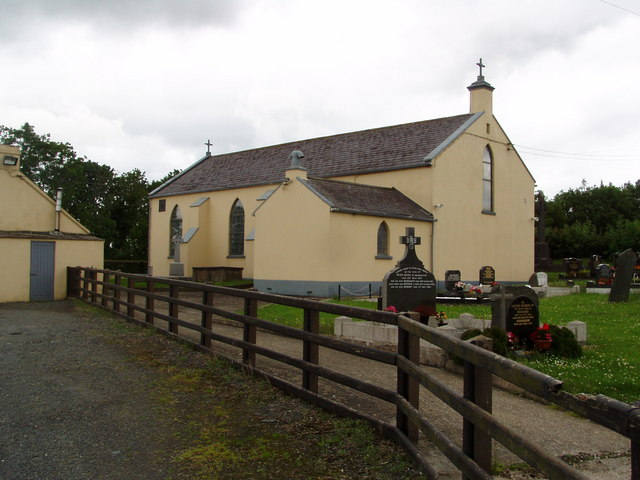
- Church of St Patrick, Ballyargan, in 2009
- County: Armagh
- Country: Northern Ireland
- Sovereign state: United Kingdom
- Postcode district: BT62
- Dialling code: 028

Ballyargan (from Irish Baile argain, meaning 'town of plunder') is a townland of 197 acres in County Armagh, Northern Ireland. It is situated in the civil parish of Ballymore and the historic barony of Orior Lower.

== See also ==
- List of townlands in County Armagh
