= Carrickbrack, County Armagh =

Northern Irish townland

Carrickbrack: Irish: Carraig Bhreac
- County: Armagh
- Country: Northern Ireland
- Sovereign state: United Kingdom
- Postcode district: BT
- Dialling code: 028

Carrickbrack (from Irish Carraig Bhreac, meaning 'speckled rock') is a townland of 213 acres in County Armagh, Northern Ireland. It is situated in the civil parish of Ballymore and the historic barony of Orior Lower.

== See also ==
- List of townlands in County Armagh
