= Shaneglish =

Townland (administrative unit) in County Armagh, Northern Ireland

Shaneglish: Irish: Sean-eglis
- County: Armagh
- Country: Northern Ireland
- Sovereign state: United Kingdom
- Postcode district: BT63
- Dialling code: 028

Shaneglish (from Irish Sean-eglis, meaning 'the old church') is a townland of 239 acres in County Armagh, Northern Ireland. It is situated in the civil parish of Ballymore and the historic barony of Orior Lower.

== See also ==
- List of townlands in County Armagh
