= Tullymacann =

- Townland
- County: Armagh
- Country: Northern Ireland
- Sovereign state: United Kingdom
- Post town: CRAIGAVON
- Postcode district: BT62

Tullymacann is a townland of 295 acres in County Armagh, Northern Ireland. It situated within the civil parish of Ballymore, in the historic barony of Orior Lower.

== Orange hall ==
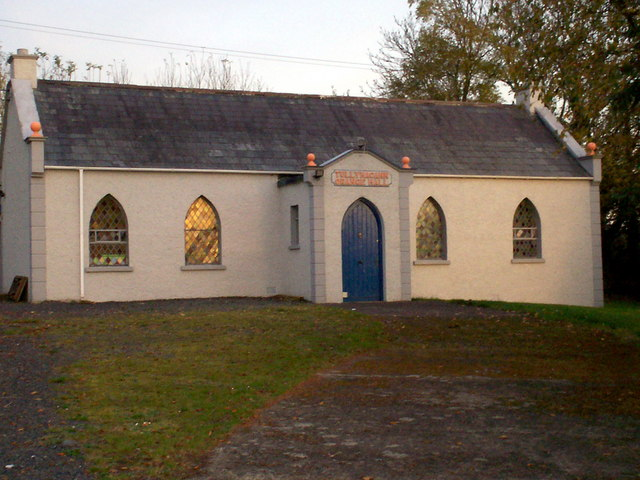
Tullymacann Orange Hall is located, just outside Tullymacann townland, in Drumnaleg

Tullymacann Orange Hall, despite its name, is located in the neighbouring townland of Drumnaleg. The hall was originally built as Glebe National School, dating as far back as 1860. It was attacked in February 1992 with minor damage inflicted. A defibrillator was attached to the hall by Drumnaleg Community Association in March 2023.

== See also ==
- List of townlands of County Armagh
