= Lisnagree, County Armagh =

Lisnagree: Irish: Lios na gcroidhe
- County: Armagh
- Country: Northern Ireland
- Sovereign state: United Kingdom
- Postcode district: BT
- Dialling code: 028

Lisnagree (from Irish Lios na gcroidhe, meaning 'fort of the cattle') is a townland of 241 acres in County Armagh, Northern Ireland. It is situated in the civil parish of Ballymore and the historic barony of Orior Lower.

== See also ==
- List of townlands in County Armagh
