= Coolyhill =

Townland in County Armagh, Northern Ireland

- County: Armagh
- Country: Northern Ireland
- Sovereign state: United Kingdom
- Postcode district: BT
- Dialling code: 028

Coolyhill is a small townland of 80 acres (0.1 sq mi) in County Armagh, Northern Ireland. It is situated in the civil parish of Ballymore and the historic barony of Orior Lower.

== See also ==
- List of townlands in County Armagh
