= Acton, County Armagh =

Coordinates: 54°18′31″N 6°22′36″W

Acton: Irish: An Chora Uachtarach
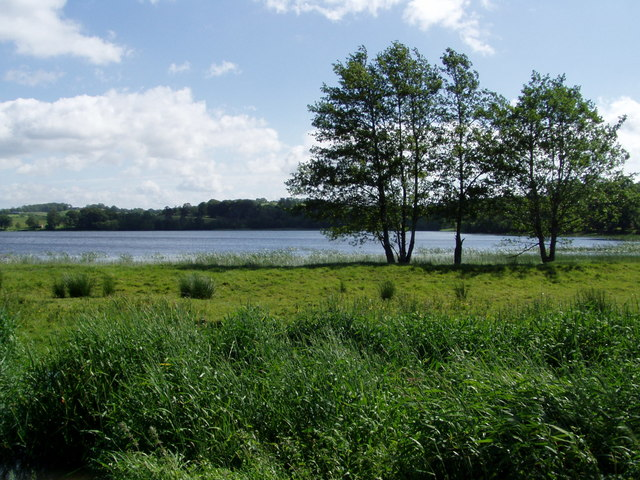
- Acton Lake

- Location within Northern Ireland
- District: Armagh City, Banbridge and Craigavon
- County: County Armagh
- Country: Northern Ireland
- Sovereign state: United Kingdom
- Postcode district: BT35
- Dialling code: 028
- UK Parliament: Newry and Armagh
- NI Assembly: Newry and Armagh

Acton is a small village and townland of 22 acres in County Armagh, Northern Ireland, about a half mile north of Poyntzpass. It is situated in the civil parish of Ballymore and the historic barony of Orior Lower and within the Armagh City, Banbridge and Craigavon Borough Council area. It had a population of 64 people in the 2021 Census.

== History ==
The village was founded in the 17th century, during the Plantation of Ulster, by Sir Toby Poyntz. He was the son of Lieutenant Charles Poyntz, who, for his military services, obtained a 500 acres (2.0 km^{2}) grant of land that had been confiscated from the O'Hanlons by the English. The Irish called the area An Chora Uachtarach, meaning "the upper weir". Before it was named Acton, the townland was known as Curryotragh. There he built a bawn 100 feet (30 m) square, a house of brick and lime for himself, and 24 cottages for some English settlers. The Poyntz family were anciently feudal barons of Curry Mallet in Somerset, England, later of Iron Acton in Gloucestershire, after which Acton, County Armagh, was named. By 1837, the village contained about 50 houses "indifferently built".
