= Clare Castle, County Armagh =

Ruined tower in Northern Ireland

Coordinates: 54.3345°N 6.4388°W

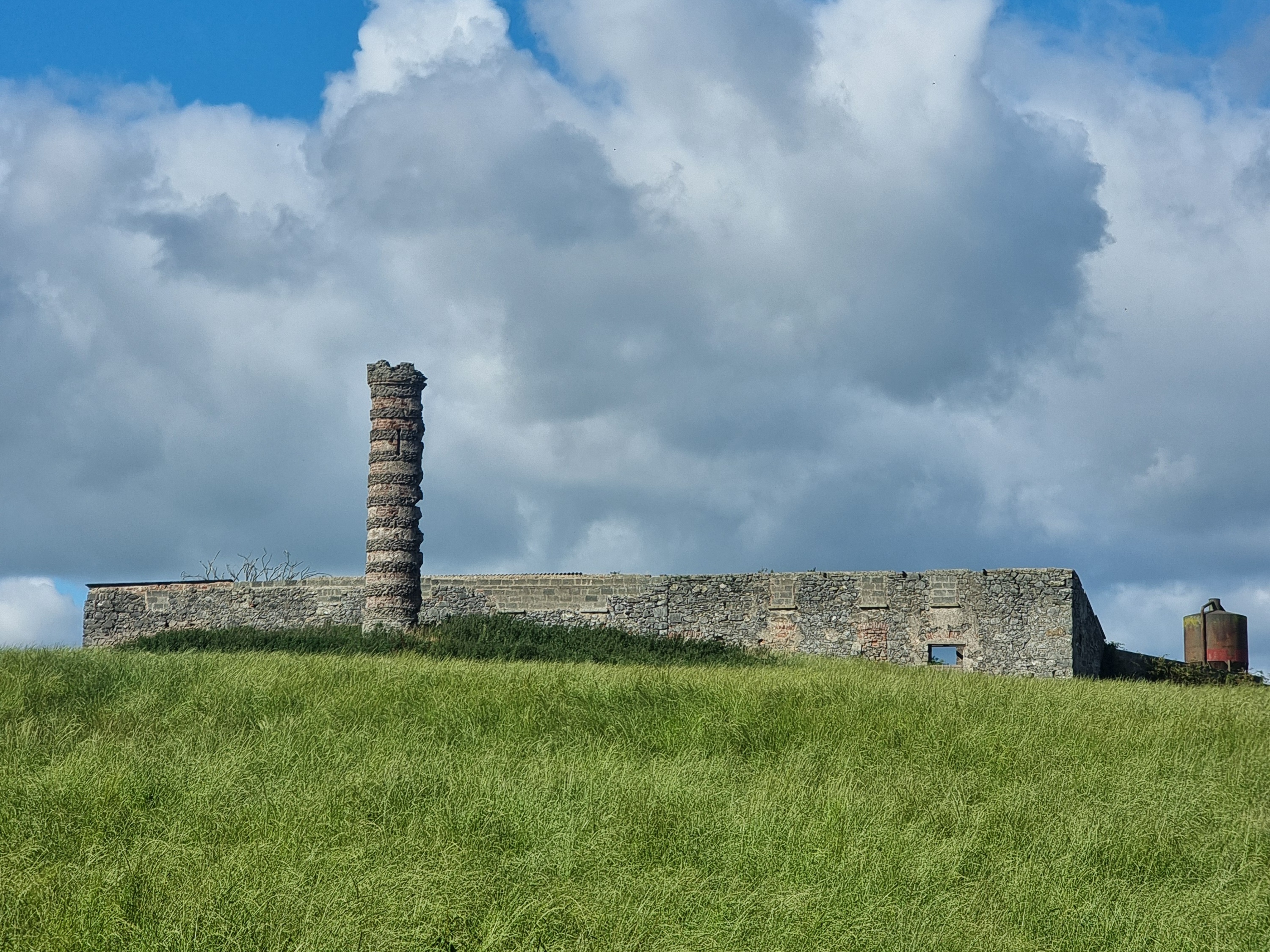
Ruins of Clare Castle in 2024

Clare Castle is a ruined tower situated near the village of Clare in County Armagh, Northern Ireland. It traces its origins back to the early 17th century, coinciding with the Ulster Plantation. As of the 21st century, the structure is a ruin. The remaining structures include a rectangular bawn which was converted into a cowshed during the 20th century.

== History ==
In 1611, Sir George Carew conducted a survey to assess the progress of the Ulster Plantation, which revealed that John Bourchier, son of George Bourchier, was in the process of collecting materials for the construction of a castle. Between 1610 and 1613, he purchased the manor of Clare from Francis Cooke.

When John Bourchier died in 1614, the manor was passed to his younger brother Henry Bourchier, who was knighted in 1621 and became Earl of Bath. In 1618–19, Captain Nicholas Pynnar conducted an additional survey to assess the further progress. His findings regarding Henry Bourchier were as follows:

Henry Bowcher Esq. hath two thousand acres called Claire. Upon this proportion there is a bawne of Lyme and Stone, being one hundred feet in length and eighty feet in breadth and fourteen feet high with two flankers. There is now in building a good stone house which is fully two stories high and a number of workmen labouring for the speedy completion thereof.

The bawn was designed as a sanctuary during times of trouble. However, T.G.F. Paterson, in his observations on Clare, notes that in 1622, the house stood three stories tall but remained unfinished, with the bawn also incomplete. He mentions the presence of two flankers, with plans for two additional ones still being considered.

In 1641, when the Irish Rebellion occurred, the settlers found themselves woefully unprepared, despite their concerns. One account indicates that rebels set fire to the Clare Castle and detained settlers within his mill.

On the evening of 28 October 1785, Clare Castle was inhabited by Mr. Thomas Leigh and Thomas Dawson. During that night, a fire broke out in the house, as reported in the newspaper:

On Monday night or Tuesday morning, the fine house of Clare Castle, near Tandragee, was totally destroyed by fire, every article of furniture, plate, jewels etc was also burnt, the family escaping barely with their lives. The house had long been noted as an eminent and venerable family seat; was lately in the possession of Mr T. Dawson, but now occupied by Mr Lee with whom Mr Dawson lodged. The fire was first providentially discovered by cries of a child, by which the whole family was alarmed. Mr Dawson, by venturing back into his room in order to save some valuable papers, had very nearly been suffocated, as was also Mr Lee. The accident, it is thought, was occasioned by some sparks from a chimney falling on the roof, which was covered with shingles.

Local tradition suggests that there were no children in the house on the night of the fire and that the "ghostly warning cry", which alerted the inhabitants, was that of a child who reputedly died in the castle amid the turmoil of the Irish Rebellion of 1641.
