= Monclone =

Monclone: Irish: Mion-cluain
- County: Armagh
- Country: Northern Ireland
- Sovereign state: United Kingdom
- Postcode district: BT63
- Dialling code: 028

Monclone (from Irish Mion-cluain, meaning 'small lawn or meadow') is a townland of 245 acres in County Armagh, Northern Ireland. It is situated in the civil parish of Ballymore and the historic barony of Orior Lower.

== See also ==
- List of townlands in County Armagh
