= Tannyoky =

Townland (administrative area) in Northern Ireland

Tannyoky: Irish: Tamnach O'Ciaidh
- County: Armagh
- Country: Northern Ireland
- Sovereign state: United Kingdom
- Postcode district: BT35
- Dialling code: 028

Tannyoky (from Irish Tamnach O'Ciaidh, meaning 'O'Key's field') is a townland of 181 acres in County Armagh, Northern Ireland. It is situated in the civil parish of Ballymore and the historic barony of Orior Lower.

== See also ==
- List of townlands in County Armagh
