= Jerrettspass =

Village in Northern Ireland

Coordinates: 54.237°N 6.372°W

Jerrettspass: Irish: Bealach Sheirit
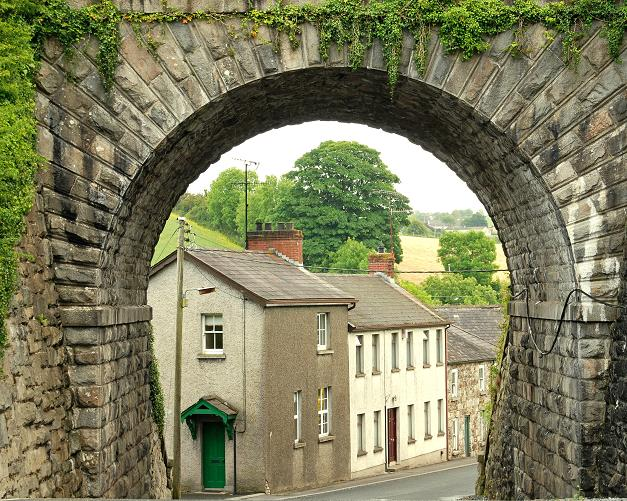
- Railway bridge at Jerrettspass

- Location within Northern Ireland
- Irish grid reference: J0633
- County: County Armagh
- Country: Northern Ireland
- Sovereign state: United Kingdom
- Post town: NEWRY
- Postcode district: BT35
- Dialling code: 028

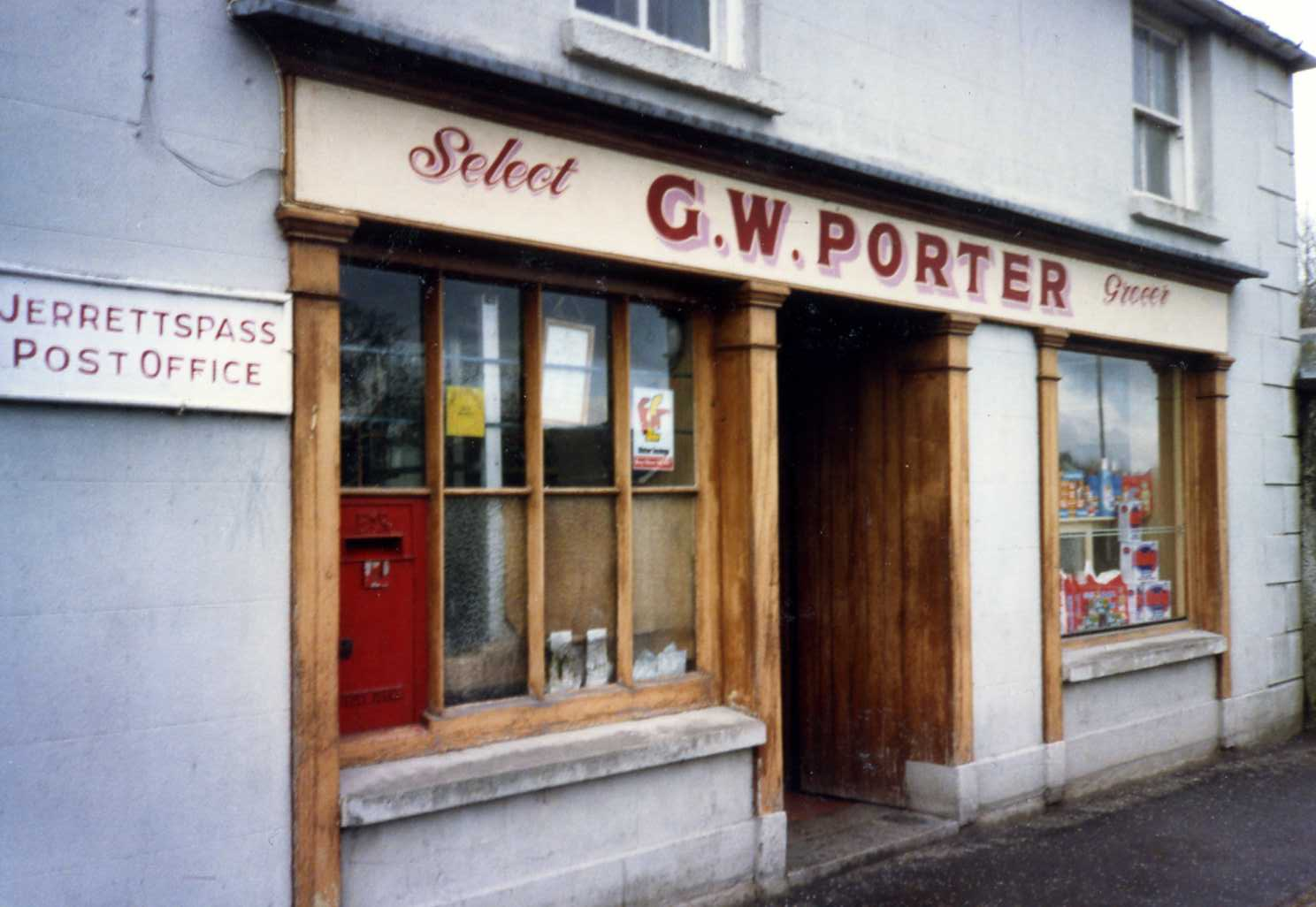
The post office at Jerrettspass, pictured here in 1988, closed in 2009

Jerrettspass (Irish: Bealach Sheirit) is a small village in County Armagh, Northern Ireland, beside the River Blackwater, that forms the border with County Down. It is situated in the townland of Kilmonaghan, in the civil parish of Killevy and the historic barony of Orior Lower, approximately 4 miles north of the city of Newry. It lies within the Newry, Mourne and Down District Council.

== History ==
The English name of the village, Jerrettspass, is reputedly a corruption of a former name, "Gerald" or "Gerrard's Pass".

There is a 1730s lock at Jerrettspass along a canal that was made at the same time, although was replaced by a railway in the 1850s. The canal, known as the Newry Canal, closed in the 1930s. The nearby rail bridge, towpath accommodation bridge and canal bridge are subject to protection as listed buildings.

The Presbyterian church at Jerrettspass was founded in 1801 and, in 1902, was joined with the nearby Drumbanagher church to form the First Drumbanagher and Jerrettspass Presbyterian Church. It was subsequently united in a joint pastorage with Kingsmill Presbyterian Church.

As of the early 20th century, the village of Jerrettspass had a post office, two shops, a public house, blacksmith's forge, a school and church. The post office, which had been in operation for approximately 150 years, closed in 2009.

In May 2021, the National Crime Agency discovered 11 firearms in Jerrettspass as part of an investigation into organised crime. It was described as "most significant firearms find in NI in a decade".

== Demography ==
NISRA does not publish discrete census data for Jerrettspass.

== See also ==
- List of towns and villages in Northern Ireland
- Lurganare
