= List of civil parishes of County Armagh =

In Ireland, the counties are divided into civil parishes and parishes are further divided into townlands. The following is a list of parishes in County Armagh.

Parish	Etymology or likely etymology	Townlands	Sources
Armagh	Irish: Ard Mhacha, meaning 'Macha's height'	24	
Ballymore	Irish: an Baile Mór, meaning 'the large settlement'	47	
Ballymyre	Irish: Baile an Mhaoir, meaning 'Myre's settlement'	8	
Clonfeacle		18	
Creggan	Irish: an Creagán, meaning 'the rocky place'	58	
Derrynoose	Irish: Doire Núis	42	
Drumcree	Irish: Droim Crí, meaning 'ridge of/on the border'	65	
Eglish	Irish: an Eaglais, meaning 'the church'	60	
Forkill	Irish: Foirceal	25	
Grange		36	
Jonesborough		3	
Keady	Irish: an Céide, meaning 'the flat-topped hill'	23	
Kilclooney	Irish: Cill Chluaine, meaning 'church of the meadow'	22	
Kildarton		18	
Killevy	Irish: Cill Shléibhe, meaning 'church of the hill'	59	
Killyman		11	
Kilmore	Irish: an Chill Mhór, meaning 'the big church'	51	
Lisnadill	Irish: Lios na Daille, meaning 'ringfort of the blindness'	24	
Loughgall	Irish: Loch gCál, meaning 'cabbage lake'	33	
Loughgilly	Irish: Loch Goilí/Loch Gile, meaning 'lake of brightness'	50	
Magheralin	Irish: Machaire Lainne, meaning 'plain of the pool'	4	
Montiaghs	Irish: (Na) Móinteacha, meaning '(the) bogs'	10	
Mullaghbrack	Irish: an Mullach Breac, meaning 'the speckled hilltop'	44	
Newry	Irish: an tIúr, meaning 'the yew'	12	
Newtownhamilton		23	
Seagoe	Irish: Suidhe Gabha, meaning 'sitting place of the smith'	47	
Shankill	Irish: Seanchill/Seanchoill, meaning 'old church/old wood'	24	
Tartaraghan		30	
Tynan	Irish: Tuíneán, meaning 'watercourse'	69	

== See also ==
- List of townlands in County Armagh
