= William Robert MacDermott =

Irish military surgeon and medical officer

Dr. William Robert MacDermott
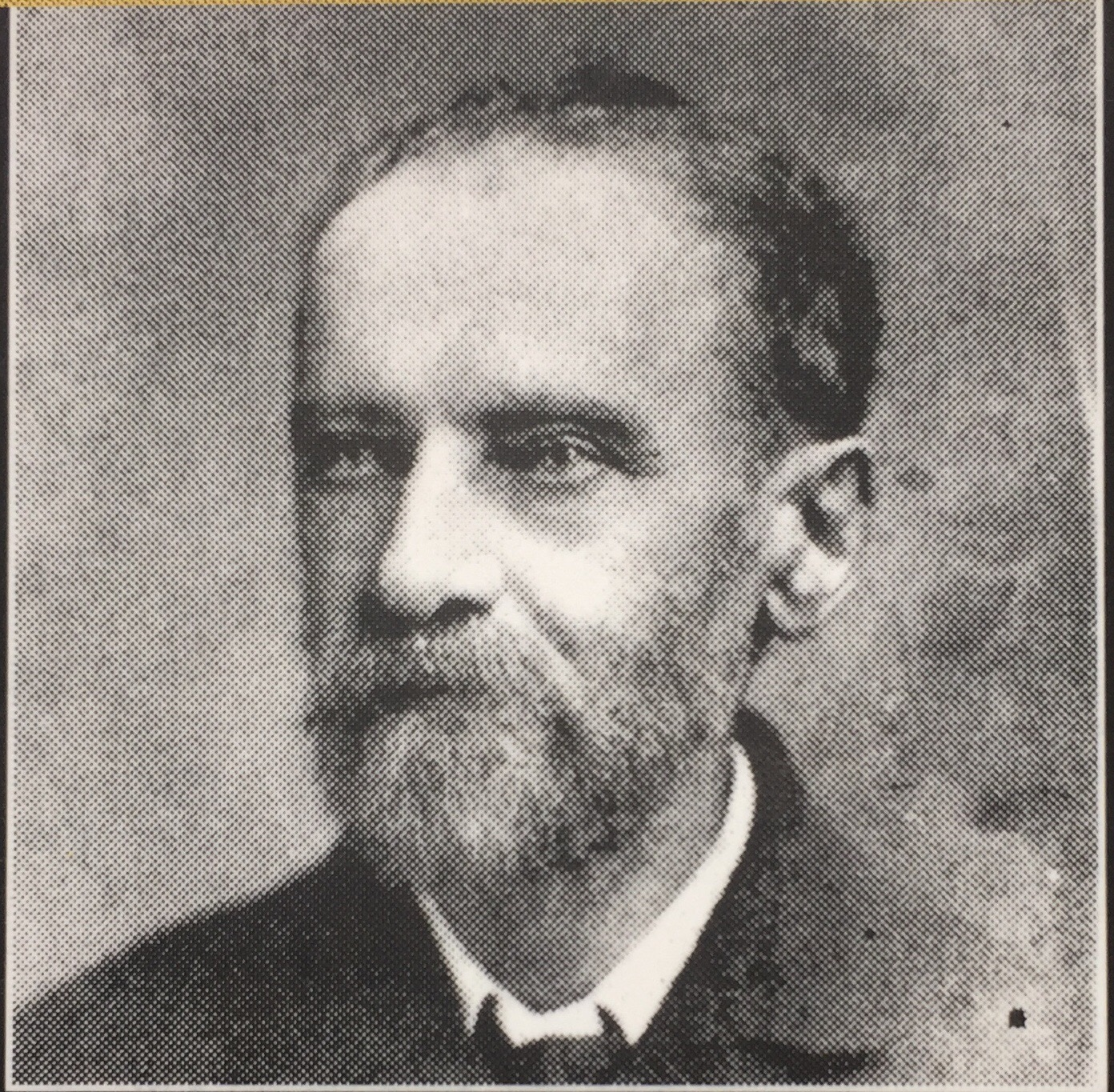
- W. R. MacDermott
- Born: 1839; Dublin, Ireland
- Died: 1918 (aged 78–79); Poyntzpass, Ireland
- Resting place: Acton Parish Church
- Other name: A. P. A. O’Gara
- Education: Trinity College Dublin
- Occupation: Doctor
- Known for: Local activism Military career
- Relatives: Dr. Ralph MacDermott (Father); William MacDermott (Grandfather)
- Military career
- Allegiance: Confederate States of America
- Branch: Confederate Army
- Service years: 1861–1864
- Rank: Surgeon Practitioner

William Robert MacDermott (1839–1918) was an Irish military surgeon and medical officer. He was the dispensary doctor of the Poyntzpass district from 1867 until his death in 1918. He was well known in the local area and was notable for his service in the Confederate States army, his activism in providing better sanitation for the area, and for his dedication to the local community, which he also served as a judge at the monthly petty sessions.

== Early life and American Civil War ==
Not much is known about MacDermott's childhood, other than he was born in Dublin to Ralph Nash MacDermott, who was from a family of practitioners; the son of William MacDermott of Bunratty and Elizabeth Nash, daughter of Ralph Nash of Cahirconlish. MacDermott's father was a man of means, being described as a ‘physician and surgeon‘ and having property at Athboy and Kells, in County Meath, and in Dublin. MacDermott entered Trinity in 1859, aged 20, but between 1861 and 1864 he drops off the Trinity books. MacDermott was in America, having emigrated to Missouri just before the outbreak of the Civil War. When the war came, he enlisted with the Confederate forces of the Missouri State Guard. In his book The Green Republic, MacDermott alludes to his ‘service to the Southern states’, as he describes it. Nothing much more is known about this time in his life, but he returned to Ireland in 1864, took his degree, and was appointed Medical Officer for the Poyntzpass District in November 1867.

== Career in Poyntzpass and later life ==
MacDermott served Poyntzpass and the surrounding countryside for more than 50 years, becoming a vital, well-known, and well-liked member of the community. He worked to improve the conditions in the village itself, and had water samples sent to London for testing. He was known for his humour and, at times, inappropriate bedside manner; at one stage greeting a bed-ridden patient (who was not suffering from anything terminal) with "you’re going to die", which, although in the long run was true, did nothing to alleviate the patient's concern.

In 1869, he performed surgery on a local man who had suffered a gunshot wound in his side, saving his life, a task he must have been familiar with after his time spent in the Confederate army. In about 1902 a local boy, William McGivern, aged about 15 at the time, has his leg badly injured by a threshing machine. MacDermott rushed to the scene and there was no other option but to amputate to save McGivern's life; no doubt his Confederate service helped him refine this skill, and McGivern lived to be 77 thanks to the work of the Doctor. Also known for his bluntness, he once shouted across the street at a young member of the gentry, Miss Alexander, to whom he had been attending, "did your bowels move today?". But despite all of these curiosities, MacDermott was known to be incredibly kind and thoughtful, and wholly dedicated to the poor, championing their cause whenever he had the opportunity; and if the opportunity did not arise, he would make sure it did.

MacDermott was a frequent contributor to the New Ireland Review, in which his essays on the ‘land question’ were published. He wrote, and had published, two books in his lifetime. The first, The Green Republic, was written under the pseudonym A. P. A. O’Gara and sought to explore the Irish ‘land question’ (as he put it) in a novel-like story; the second was Foughilotra: a forbye story, which was written under his own name, but entirely in the local dialect of Poyntzpass.

In 1918, he died at his home in Chapel Street, Poyntzpass. His passing was met with deep regret and sadness, and many turned out for his funeral, conducted by the Rev. W. F. Johnston in the local Church of Ireland, Acton Parish Church. A year earlier, in 1917, in celebration of his 50 years in Poyntzpass, the Board of Guardians paid him this tribute:

"During the past half-century, Dr. MacDermott has discharged the duties of his office in the most exemplary manner and as a consequence he stands high in the estimation of all who have had the pleasure of his acquaintance. A gentleman of kindly, courteous and considerate disposition, he has proved not only a good physician but a true friend. Indeed it can be truly said he bore with out abuse the grand old name of gentleman. To the sick poor of the district he was particularly attentive, for he ever had "a tear for pity and a hand open as day for melting charity." He possessed in a noteworthy degree the luxury of doing good and few there are who cannot recall "acts of kindness and love" on his part. In truth his life has been "gentle, and the elements so mixed up in him that nature could stand up and say to all the world 'This was a man'."
