= Dorsey Emmet's GFC =

Armagh-based Gaelic games club

Dorsey Emmets GFC
- CPG Eiméid na nDoirse
- Founded: 1917
- County: Armagh
- Nickname: The Dorsey
- Colours: Green and yellow
- Grounds: Páirc Ruairí Mag Aoidh
- Coordinates: 54°08′34.76″N 6°33′03.33″W

Playing kits
Standard colours

Dorsey Emmet's Gaelic Football Club is a Gaelic Athletic Association club based in the hamlet of Dorsey and the surrounding area of Lower Creggan parish, in the rural south of County Armagh, Northern Ireland. Affiliated to Armagh GAA, it fields football teams at Under-8, U-10 and senior level, and is also involved in Ladies' Gaelic football. The senior men's team plays in the Armagh Junior Football Championship and in Armagh Division 3B

Dorsey's U-14 players are amalgamated with Newtownhamilton and play as Newtown Emmet's. The U-16s are joined with Peadar Ó Doirníns Forkhill and St Michael's Newtownhamilton and play as Newtown Emmets Ó Doirníns.

== History ==
On 17 March 1917, the first recorded game of the Dorsey Emmet's took place in Caffrey's Meadow near Dorsey School, against Lislea. Their colours, green and gold, were a popular choice because of their patriotic associations. The War of Independence in 1919-21 saw a decline in interest in Gaelic football in the Dorsey area.

In 1948 the Emmet's were reformed and affiliated, adopting the green and gold of the old team. Their first game was a challenge against neighbouring club Cullyhanna Kevin Barry's on Easter Sunday which ended in a draw, 3-02 to 2-05. In the face of economic depression and mass emigration the Emmet's managed to keep the club alive until 1956, when they were obliged to amalgamate with Cullyhanna.

The combined Dorsey and Cullyhanna team, called Tom Williams GFC, were winners of the Silverbridge Cup in 1962. A Dorsey team, probably the amalgamation, won the 1964 Armagh Junior Football Championship, and, promoted to the Intermediate, lost the 1965 final to Clan na Gael.

In 1999, Dorsey Emmet's reformed and affiliated for the 2000 season. In 2003 the U-10 team won the 3rd Division shield against Whitecross in Belleeks. In 2006 the U-14 side also won a shield against Belleeks at the Silverbridge field. In May 2007, the Dorsey senior team took part in their first match to be broadcast live, on Five FM, playing Belleeks.

In 2012 Dorsey's Senior Men's team was promoted from the Junior league to the Intermediate league in a landmark achievement for the club.

=== Honours ===
- Armagh Intermediate Football Championship
  - Runners-up 1965 (as Tom Williams GFC)
- Armagh Junior Football Championship (1)
  - 1964 (as Tom Williams GFC)
- Silverbridge Cup (1)
  - 1962 (as Tom Williams GFC)

== Ladies' Gaelic football ==
The Ladies senior team were awarded Club of the year in Armagh in 2008 and in 2010 were asked to participate in the 2010 Comórtas Peile Páidi Ó Sé tournament in the Dingle Peninsula, County Kerry from 26–28 February. The Comórtas Ó Sé is an invitation-only senior club Men's and Ladies Gaelic football tournament.

== Facilities ==
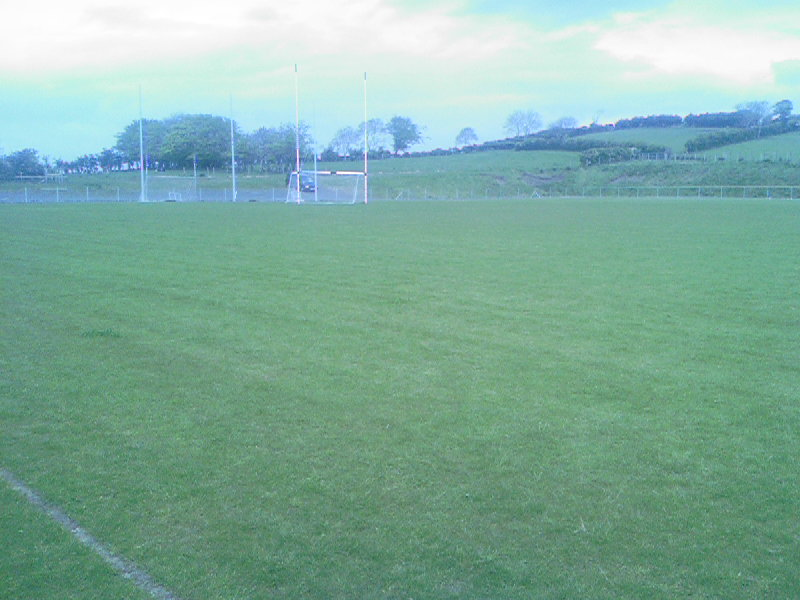
Rory McGee Park

The decision to develop a playing ground was made in 2003, and was immensely ambitious for so small and young a club. Money to build the field was raised by the local community and the club. The project succeeded and the club's home ground is now the Rory McGee Park in Dorsey village, close to the church and community centre. The field was named after Rory McGee, the first secretary of the reformed club, who died in 2005 aged 26. The first official game played was in January 2007 when the Dorsey Senior Ladies team played Mullabrack Ladies. The Park was officially opened in April 2007.
