= Demoan =

Townland in Northern Ireland

Demoan: Irish: Déagh-Móin
- County: Armagh
- Country: Northern Ireland
- Sovereign state: United Kingdom
- Postcode district: BT
- Dialling code: 028

Demoan (from Irish Déagh-Móin, meaning 'good bog') is a townland of 341 acres in County Armagh, Northern Ireland. It is situated in the civil parish of Ballymore and the historic barony of Orior Lower.

== See also ==
- List of townlands in County Armagh
