= Ballymore, County Armagh =

Ballymore, County Armagh: Irish: An Baile Mór
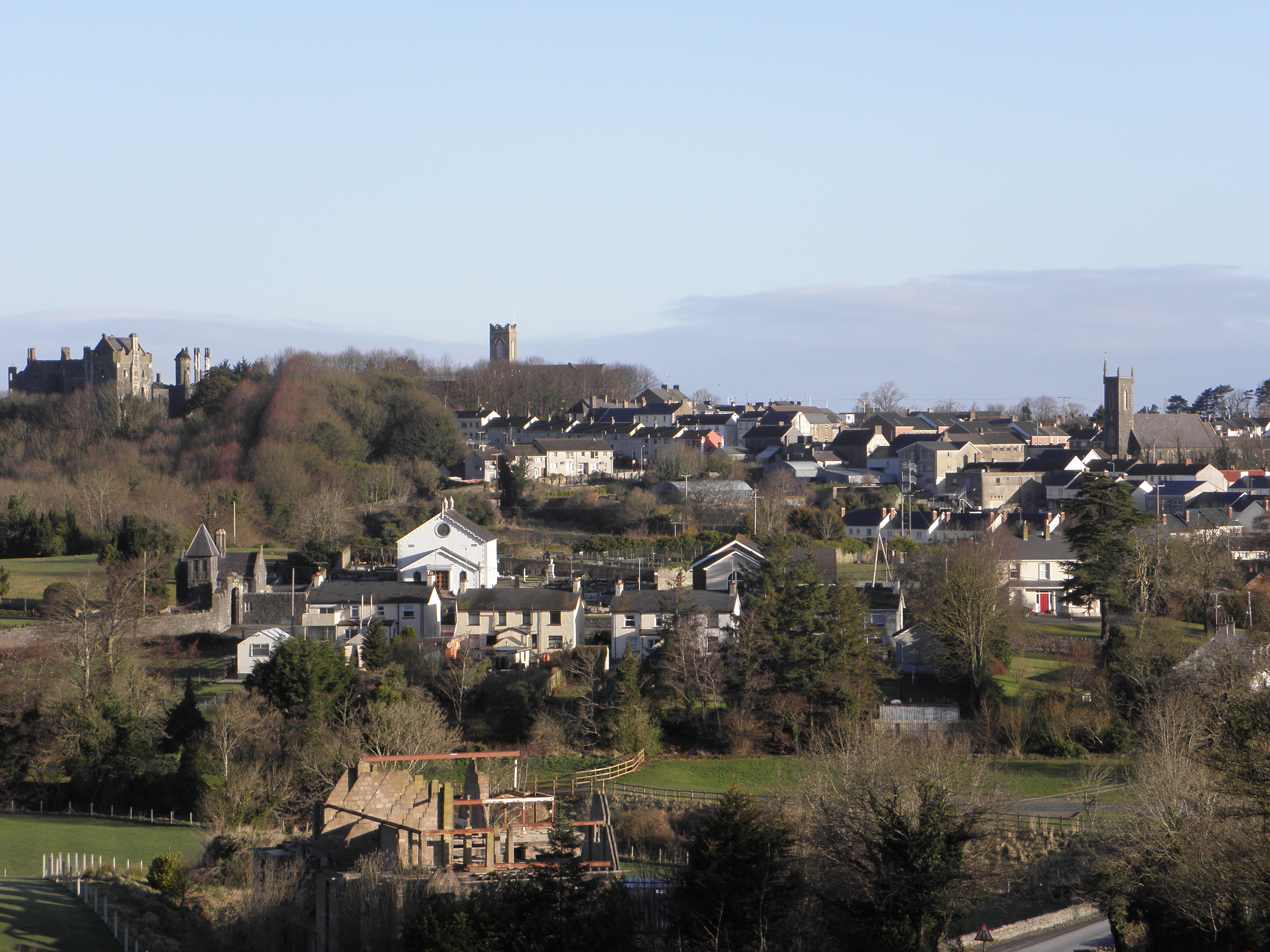
- Tandragee, with a population of over 3,500, is the largest town in Ballymore civil parish
- County: Armagh
- Country: Northern Ireland
- Sovereign state: United Kingdom
- Postcode district: BT
- Dialling code: 028

Ballymore (from Irish An Baile Mór, meaning 'the large town, settlement') is a civil parish in County Armagh, Northern Ireland. It is situated in the historic barony of Orior Lower. Ballymore is also the name of a townland, of 676 acres, within the civil parish.

== Towns and villages ==
The civil parish contains the villages of Acton, Poyntzpass, Clare, and Tandragee.

== Townlands ==
Ballymore civil parish contains at least 48 townlands. These include:

- Acton (Irish: An Chora Uachtarach)
- Aghantaraghan (Achadh an Taracháin)
- Aughlish (Achadh Lis)
- Ballyargan (Baile Argain or 'town of plunder')
- Ballymore (Baile Mór)
- Ballynagreagh (Baile na gCreach)
- Ballynaleck (Baile na Leac or 'town of the flags/stones')
- Ballyreagh (An Baile Riabhach)
- Ballysheil Beg (Baile Uí Shiail Beag or 'Ó Sheil's townland (little)')
- Ballysheil More (Baile Uí Shiail Mór)
- Brannock (Bran Cnoc or 'raven's hill')
- Cargans (Cargáin)
- Carrickbrack
- Clare
- Cloghoge: (Clochóg; 229 acres)
- Coolyhill
- Corcrum
- Corernagh
- Corlust
- Crew Beg
- Crew More
- Cullentragh
- Demoan
- Derryallen
- Druminargal
- Druminure
- Drumnaglontagh (Dromann na gCluainte)
- Drumnaleg
- Federnagh (An Fheadarnach or 'the middle place')
- Glasdrumman
- Lisbane
- Lisnagree
- Lisnakea
- Lisraw
- Mavemacullen
- Monclone
- Moodoge
- Mullaghglass
- Mullanary
- Mullantur
- Shaneglish
- Skegatillida
- Tannyoky
- Terryhoogan
- Tullyhugh
- Tullylinn (Tulaigh linne or 'hill of the pond')
- Tullymacann
- Tullynacross

== Religion ==
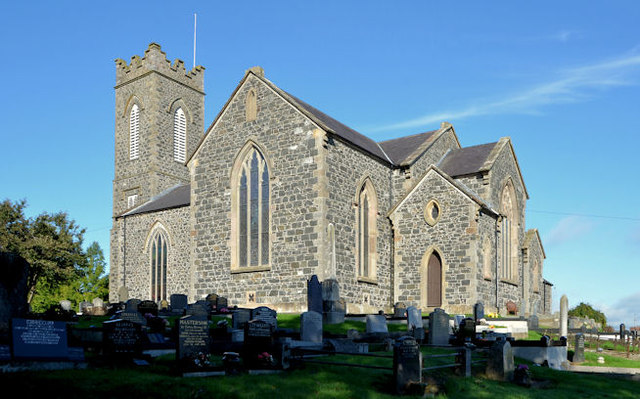
Ballymore (Church of Ireland) parish church in Tandragee

Ballymore & Clare is an ecclesiastical parish in the Church of Ireland Diocese of Armagh. The main church of this parish, Ballymore Parish Church, is located in Tandragee. It has historical links to the local landowners, the Dukes of Manchester. The first records of at church at Ballymore date to 1343. This church was severely damaged during the Irish Rebellion of 1641. The original (fire damaged) church was "pulled down" and rebuilt in 1812.

Ballymore & Mullaghbrack is a Catholic parish in the Roman Catholic Archdiocese of Armagh. The churches in this parish are at Mullaghbrack (St James of Jerusalem), Tandragee (St James the Apostle), Poyntzpass (St Joseph) and Ballyargan (Church of St Patrick).

== See also ==
- List of civil parishes of County Armagh
