= King's Stables =

Archaeological site in Northern Ireland

The King's Stables is an archaeological site in County Armagh, Northern Ireland. The earthwork known as the King's Stables is a Scheduled Historic Monument in the townland of Tray, in Armagh City and District Council area, at grid ref: H8388 4546.

== Features ==
The site consists of a boggy hollow, originally an artificial, flat-bottomed pool about 25 metres (80 ft) in diameter, partly surrounded by an earthen bank, about 300 metres (1,000 ft) north-east of Haughey's Fort. It dates to the late Bronze Age, ca. 1000 BC, contemporary with Haughey's Fort. Excavations in 1975 discovered clay moulds for bronze leaf-shaped swords, pottery, and items of worked bone and wood. Also found were 214 animal bones and a human skull.

== Name ==
The name is probably related to a local tradition that the ancient kings of Ulster watered their horses and washed their chariots in the pool. The same name has been given to Milecastle 48 on Hadrian's Wall; in this case, the layout of the walls is reminiscent of stables.

== See also ==
- List of archaeological sites in County Armagh
