= Poyntzpass =

Village in County Armagh, Northern Ireland

Coordinates: 54.287°N 6.372°W

Poyntzpass: Irish: Pas an Phointe
- Village
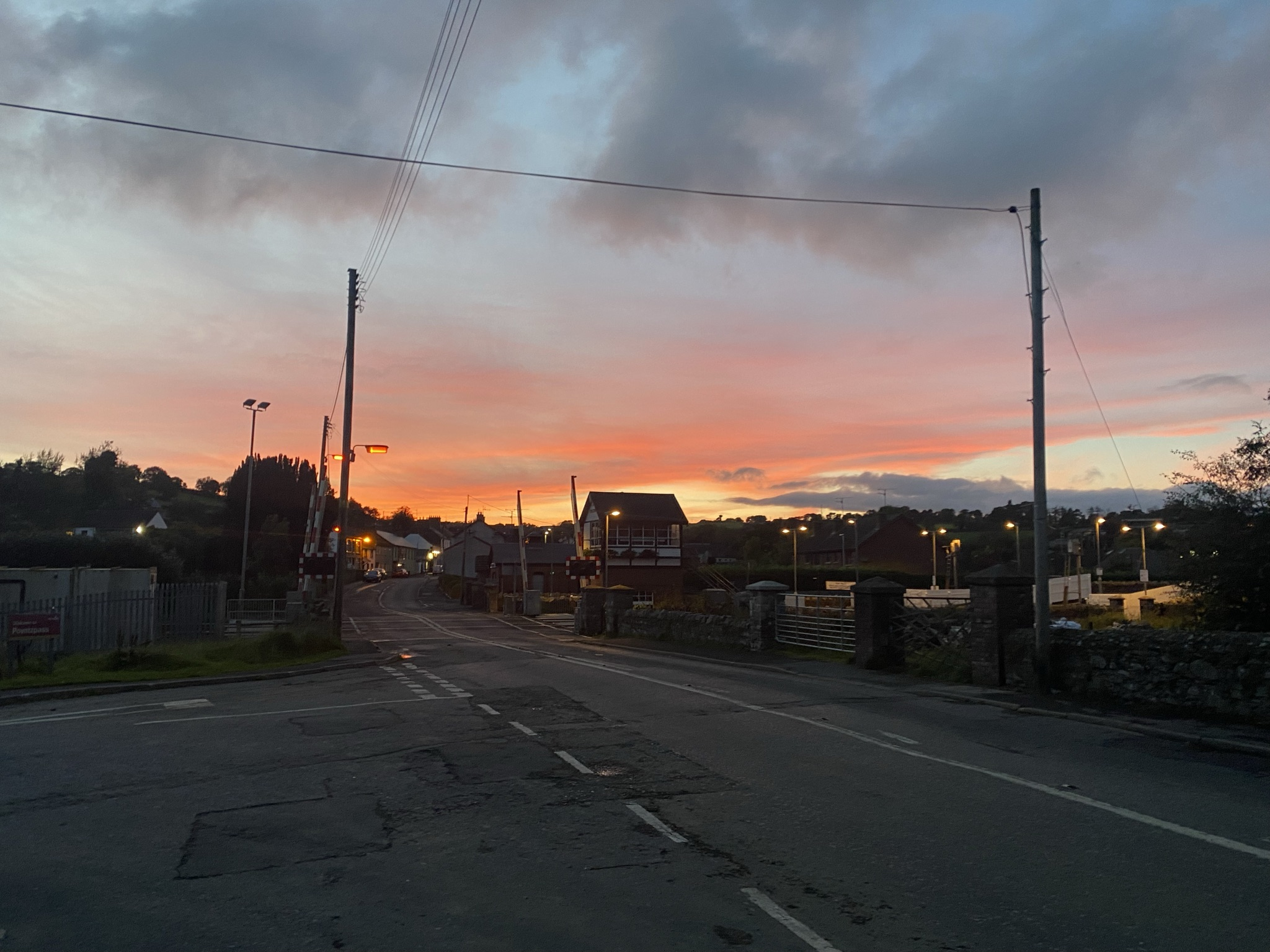
- The level-crossing at Poyntzpass

- Location within Northern Ireland
- Population: 552 (2011 census)
- Irish grid reference: J057394
  - Belfast: 29.02 mi (46.70 km)
- District: Armagh, Banbridge and Craigavon
- County: County Armagh & County Down
- Country: Northern Ireland
- Sovereign state: United Kingdom
- Post town: NEWRY
- Postcode district: BT35
- Dialling code: 028
- Police: Northern Ireland
- Fire: Northern Ireland
- Ambulance: Northern Ireland
- UK Parliament: South Down
- NI Assembly: South Down

Poyntzpass is a small village on the border between southern County Armagh and County Down in Northern Ireland. It is situated in the civil parish of Ballymore and the historic barony of Orior Lower within the Armagh City, Banbridge and Craigavon area. It had a population of 552 people (228 households) in the 2011 census.

The village covers the townlands of Tullynacross, Brannock, Federnagh and Loughadian. It includes five places of Christian worship; a Roman Catholic church, a Church of Ireland church, a Presbyterian church, a Baptist church, and an Independent church; 3 public houses; and 2 primary schools.

== History ==
The second half of the village's name reflects the fact that, historically, it was one of a few crossing points across a marsh stretching 25 miles (40 km) from Lough Neagh to Carlingford Lough, following the course of a prehistoric glacial overflow channel. It was named after Lieutenant Charles Poyntz who fought a battle there against Hugh O'Neill, 3rd Earl of Tyrone in 1598.

An entry in A Topographical Dictionary of Ireland, published by Samuel Lewis in 1837, reads:

"POYNTZPASS, or FENWICK'S PASS, a small town, partly in the parish of AGHADERG, barony of UPPER IVEAGH, county of DOWN, but chiefly in the parish of BALLYMORE barony of LOWER ORIOR, county of ARMAGH and province of ULSTER, 2¾ miles (S.W.) from Loughbrickland, to which it has a penny post; containing 660 inhabitants, of which number, 88 are in the county of Down. This place was an encumbered pass through bogs and woods, from the county of Down into that of Armagh, and from the O'Hanlons' to the Magennises' country: it derives its present name from this important military position having been forced, after a desperate action, by Lieut. Poyntz, of the English army, with a few troops, against a numerous body of Tyrone's soldiers, for which service he was rewarded with a grant of 500 acres [2 km²] in this barony: there are some remains of the castle that commanded the pass. At Drumbanagher are vestiges of the entrenchment surrounding the principal strong hold of the Earl of Tyrone, during his wars with Queen Elizabeth, called Tyrone's Ditches. Poyntz-Pass is now one of the most fertile and beautiful spots in this part of the country. To the south is Drumbanagher Castle, the handsome residence of Lieut.-Col. Maxwell Close, built in the Italian style, with a large portico in front; on an eminence above the town is Acton House, the elegant residence of C. R. Dobbs, Esq.; not far from which is Union Lodge, that of W. Fivey, Esq., in a beautiful demesne, bounded by the extensive waters of Lough Shark. That portion of the town which is in the county of Armagh was built about 1790, by Mr. Stewart, then proprietor, who procured for it a grant of a market and fairs; the former was never established, but the latter, held on the first Saturday in every month, are large and well attended, great numbers of cattle and sheep being sold. The town comprises 116 houses in one principal street, intersected by a shorter one. It contains the church for the district of Acton, a small neat edifice in the early English style, with a tower at the east front, built in 1789, and considerably enlarged and improved in 1829; a R. C. chapel, a school, and a constabulary police station."

A castle was once situated in Poyntzpass. Its remnants were visible until the middle of the 19th century, but there is now no trace of it other than in the name 'Castle Corner' by which a corner of William Street is sometimes known.

On 3 March 1998, 26-year old Catholic Damian Trainor and 34-year old Presbyterian Philip Allen, were shot dead during a Loyalist Volunteer Force gun attack on the Railway Bar in Poyntzpass.

== Demography ==
On census day in 2011 (27 March 2011), there were 552 people living in Poyntzpass. Of these:

- 24.64% were aged under 16 years and 13.77% were aged 65 and over;
- 51.81% of the usually resident population were female and 48.19% were male;
- 68.12% belong to or were brought up in the Catholic religion and 26.89% belong to or were brought up in a 'Protestant and Other Christian (including Christian related)' religion;
- 42.03% had an Irish national identity, 30.80% indicated that they had a British national identity and 32.25% had a Northern Irish national identity (respondents could indicate more than one national identity);
- 35 years was the average (median) age of the population;
- 16.60% had some knowledge of Irish (Gaelic) and 2.15% had some knowledge of Ulster-Scots.

== Sport ==
The local Gaelic football club, named in honour of the rapparee, is Redmond O'Hanlon's (Cumann Réamainn Uí Anluain). Created around 1960, it became inactive in 1970 but was revived in 1977. As of 2012, it was competing at Junior level in competitions organised by Armagh GAA.

== Transport ==
Poyntzpass straddles the main Belfast-Dublin railway line, and has a Northern Ireland Railways railway station. Poyntzpass railway station opened on 6 January 1862.

The Newry Canal which flows through Poyntzpass follows the Armagh/Down border and was one of the first major canals to be constructed in Britain or Ireland. However, it never really fulfilled its promise to bring industry and prosperity and has been derelict since the 1940s. Its summit level is one mile (1.6 km) from the village at Acton Lake (Lough Shark).

== Education ==
Primary schools in the area include Poyntzpass Primary School and Joseph and St. James's Primary School.

== Notable people ==
- Redmond O'Hanlon, a 17th century rapparee, was a Poyntzpass native.
- Charles Davis Lucas, first recipient of the Victoria Cross, in 1857, was born and grew up nearby.
- Dr. W. R. MacDermott, a local dispensary doctor, published his novel "The Green Republic" in 1904, under the penname A.P.A. O'Gara. His fictional village, Jigglestreet, was based on Poyntzpass and its inhabitants; MacDermott used this story to advance his ideas on Irish Land Reform.
- Joe Lennon, who won three All-Ireland Senior Football medals with Down and captained the team in 1968, was born in Poyntzpass.
- Simon Best and Rory Best, brothers who played international rugby for Ireland, are from the village.

== See also ==
- List of villages in Northern Ireland
- List of towns in Northern Ireland
