= Haughey's Fort =

Hill fort in County Armagh, Northern Ireland

Coordinates: 54.345°N 6.759°W

Haughey's Fort is a hill fort in County Armagh, Northern Ireland, 2 1/4 miles (3.6 km) west of the city of Armagh. It is named after the farmer who owned the land it is situated on in the later 19th century. The large hilltop enclosure that is Haughey's Fort is a Scheduled Historic Monument in the townland of Tray, in Armagh City and District Council area, at grid ref: H8351 4529.

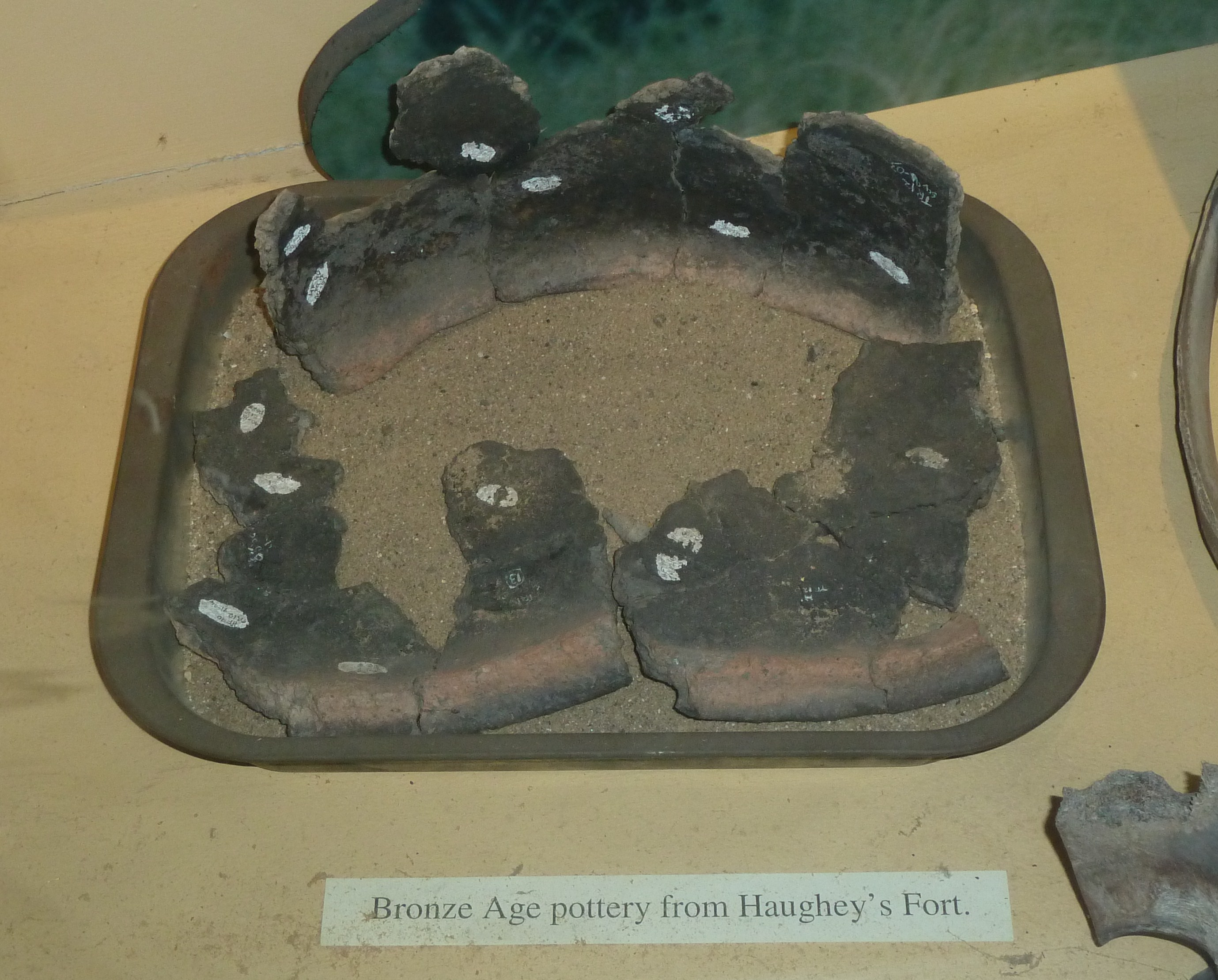
Bronze Age pot found at Haughey's Fort

It consists of an oval enclosure, 350 metres (1,150 feet) across at its widest point, surrounded by two concentric ditches. Inside the enclosure another ditch encloses an area 150 metres (490 feet) in diameter. Archaeological excavation shows that it was occupied in the late Bronze Age, ca. 1100 to 900 BC, after which it was abandoned, although some artefacts discovered were of Iron Age date, suggesting that it was later reoccupied. It was contemporary with the nearby artificial pool known as the King's Stables but was abandoned before Navan Fort, 0.6 miles (0.97 km) to the east, was occupied.
