= Loughnashade =

- Loch na Séad (Irish)
- Interactive map of Loughnashade
- Location: County Armagh, Northern Ireland
- Coordinates: 54.35032°N 6.69068°W
- Basin countries: United Kingdom

Loughnashade (Irish: Loch na Séad, meaning "lake of the jewels") is a small freshwater lake located near Navan Fort (Emain Macha) in County Armagh, Northern Ireland. It is known for its archaeological significance due to the discovery of the Loughnashade Horns in 1794, and for its proximity to the ancient royal site of the Ulster kings.

== Geography ==
Loughnashade lies approximately 550 metres east of Navan Fort. Although the present lake covers just one acre, historical maps and palaeoenvironmental evidence suggest it was once much larger, possibly up to 10 hectares in extent. A pictorial map from 1602 and an Ordnance Survey map from 1835 depict a more expansive lake surrounded by marshland. The site is on private land but can be viewed from the summit of Navan Fort.

== Archaeology ==
In 1794, drainage operations uncovered four Iron Age bronze horns in the lakebed of Loughnashade. These instruments, now referred to as the Loughnashade Horns, were discovered along with human remains, including skulls and bones. The context of the find suggests ritual deposition, a practice common across prehistoric Europe involving water bodies as places of ceremonial offering.

Only one horn survives and is held in the National Museum of Ireland. The surviving instrument is considered an outstanding example of Iron Age metalworking.

== Antiquarian interest ==
Mary Ann McCracken (1770–1866) played a key role in documenting the find. In a letter published in the Belfast Magazine (February 1809), she appealed for public information on the horns and argued for their preservation in a museum. Her brother, John McCracken, produced illustrations later included in Edward Bunting's 1809 publication, A General Collection of the Ancient Music of Ireland, although Mary Ann's textual contributions were not credited.

== Folklore ==
A local legend explains the name of the lake. According to the story, King Conchobar mac Nessa entrusted his jewels to a dragon brought from China by a travelling musician. The dragon guarded the treasure at the bottom of the lake and would emerge only at the sound of the musician's pipes. Upon the musician's death, the dragon and the jewels remained submerged, giving rise to the name Loch na Séad.
