= Lisnadill =

Hamlet in County Armagh, Northern Ireland

Coordinates: 54.301°N 6.640°W

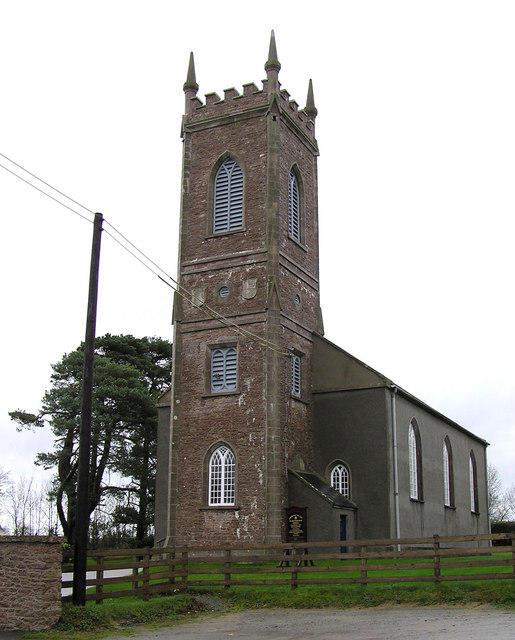
St John's Church of Ireland, Lisnadill

Lisnadill (from Irish Lios na Daille, meaning 'ringfort of the blindness') is a hamlet, townland and civil parish in County Armagh, Northern Ireland. In the 2005 Census it had a population of 54 people. It lies about 3 miles south of Armagh and is within the Armagh City, Banbridge and Craigavon Borough Council area.

== People ==
- Frederick Francis Maude, born in Lisnadill on 20 December 1821, was an Irish recipient of the Victoria Cross.

== Education ==
- Lisnadill Primary School

== See also ==
- List of civil parishes of County Armagh
