= Mullaghglass =

Village in County Armagh, Northern Ireland

Coordinates: 54.207°N 6.370°W

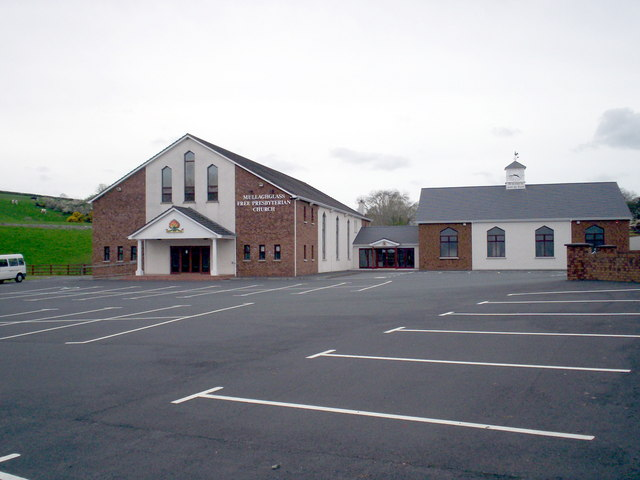
Free Presbyterian Church and church hall

Mullaghglass (from Irish an Mullach Glas, meaning 'the green hilltop'; also spelt Mullaglass) is a small village and townland north of Newry in County Armagh, Northern Ireland. It was named after the nearby townland of Mullaghglass, although the village itself is within the townland of Latt (from Irish an Leacht). In the 2001 Census it had a population of 135. It is within the Newry and Mourne District Council area.

== Education ==
- Mullaglass Primary School

== Churches ==
- St. Luke's Mullaglass Church of Ireland
- Mullaghglass Free Presbyterian Church
