= Mavemacullen (Ballymore) =

- Townland
- County: Armagh
- Country: Northern Ireland
- Sovereign state: United Kingdom
- Post town: CRAIGAVON
- Postcode district: BT62

Mavemacullen is a small townland of 399 acres (0.6 sq mi) in County Armagh, Northern Ireland. It is situated within the civil parish of Ballymore, in the historic barony of Orior Lower.

== Accordion band ==
Mavemacullen Accordion Band was formed on 6 August 1953 at Mavemacullen Orange Hall and is connected to Mavemacullen LOL 739 as a lodge band. The band holds a parade on the second Wednesday in August annually in Markethill. It also featured in the third series of The Band which aired on BBC One on 17 January 2024.

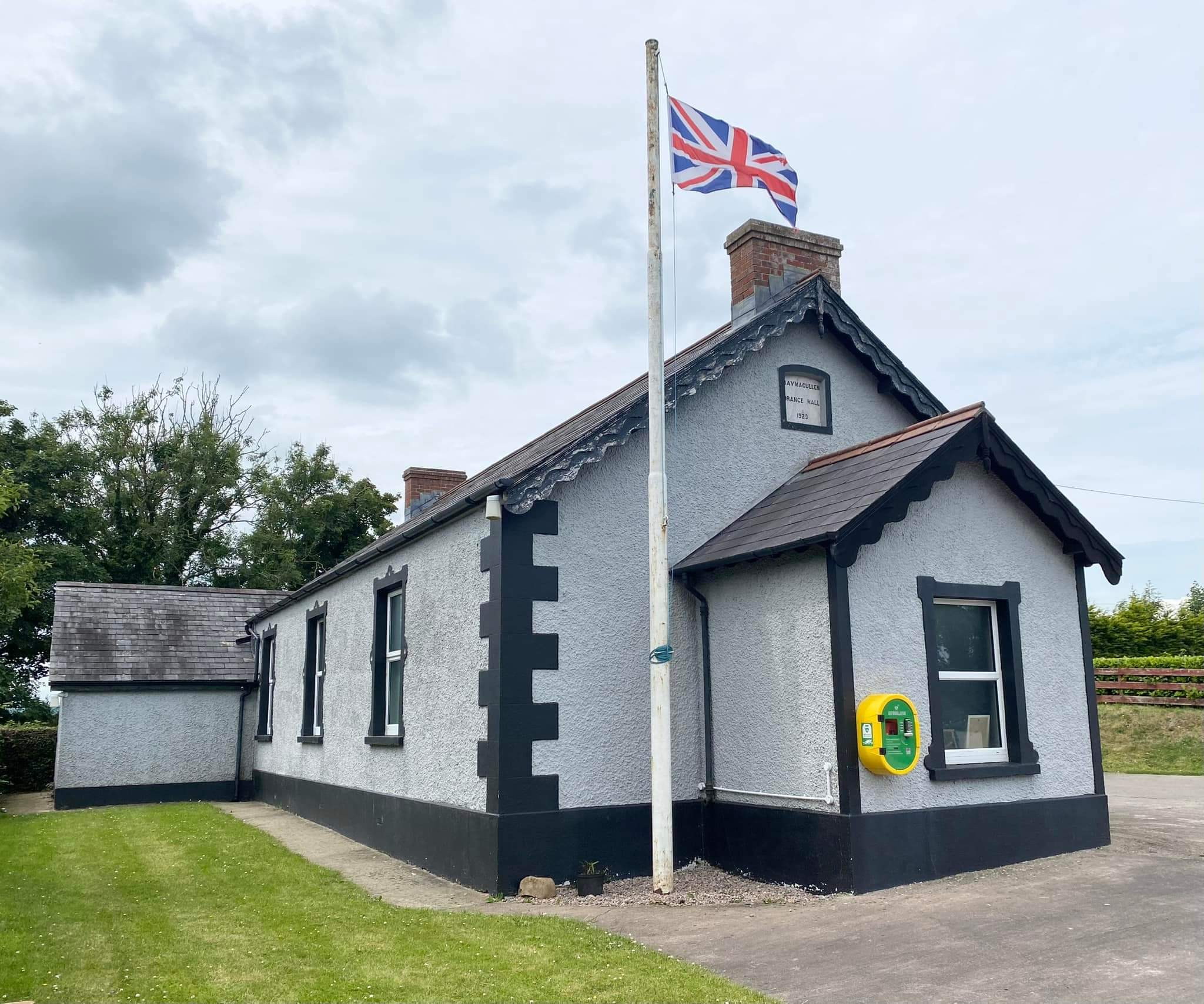
Mavemacullen Orange Hall (2024)

== See also ==
- List of townlands of County Armagh
