= Black Pig's Dyke =

Linear earthworks in Ireland

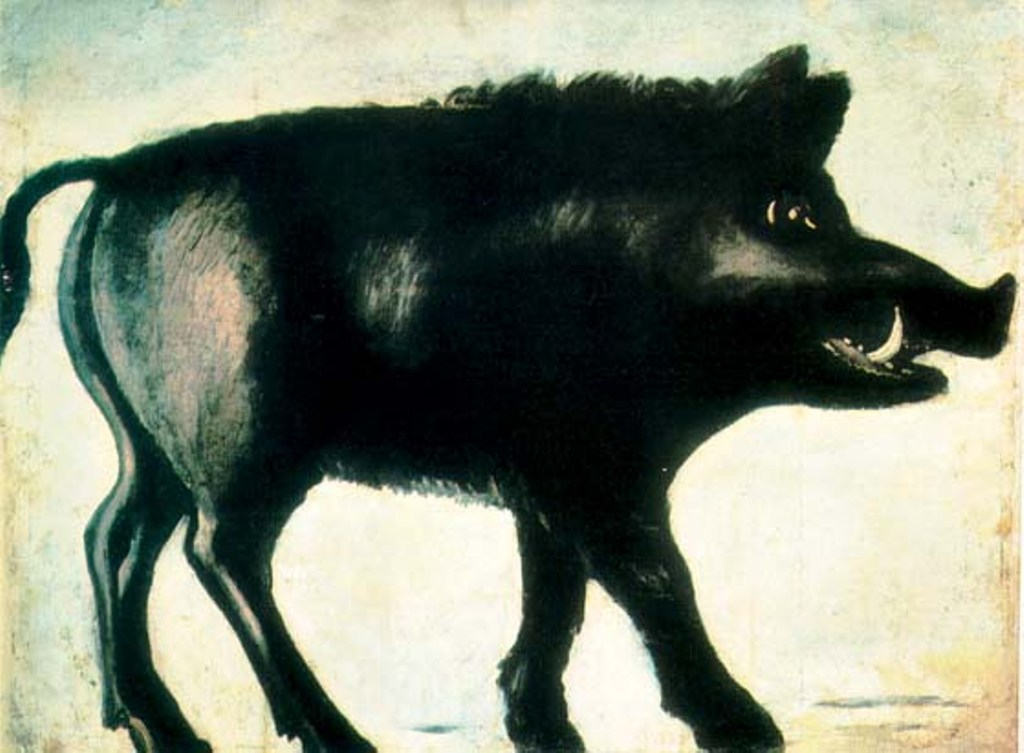
According to Irish folklore, the earthworks were created by the tusks of a huge black boar

The Black Pig's Dyke (Irish: Claí na Muice Duibhe) or Worm's Ditch (Irish: Claí na Péiste) is a series of discontinuous linear earthworks in southwest Ulster and northeast Connacht, Ireland. Remnants can be found in north County Leitrim, north County Longford, County Cavan, County Monaghan and County Fermanagh (see the map below). Sometimes, the Dorsey enclosure in County Armagh and the Dane's Cast in County Down are considered to be part of the dyke.

Similar earthworks can be found throughout Ireland, although the Black Pig's Dyke is the best known. A notable example is the Claidh Dubh ("black ditch"), anglicised Clyduff or Cleeduff, in eastern County Cork. It has three sections, the longest of which runs north–south for 24 kilometres (15 mi) from the Ballyhoura Hills to the Nagle Mountains.

== Name ==
In Counties Leitrim and Cavan, the earthworks are generally called the Black Pig's Dyke or Dike. In County Longford, it is called the Black Pig's Race, while in the Cavan–Monaghan border area it is called the Black Pig's Dyke or the Worm Ditch. The ditches take their names from Gaelic folklore. One tale says that a huge black boar tore up the countryside with its large tusks. Another says that the ditches were made by a huge worm.

== Construction and purpose ==
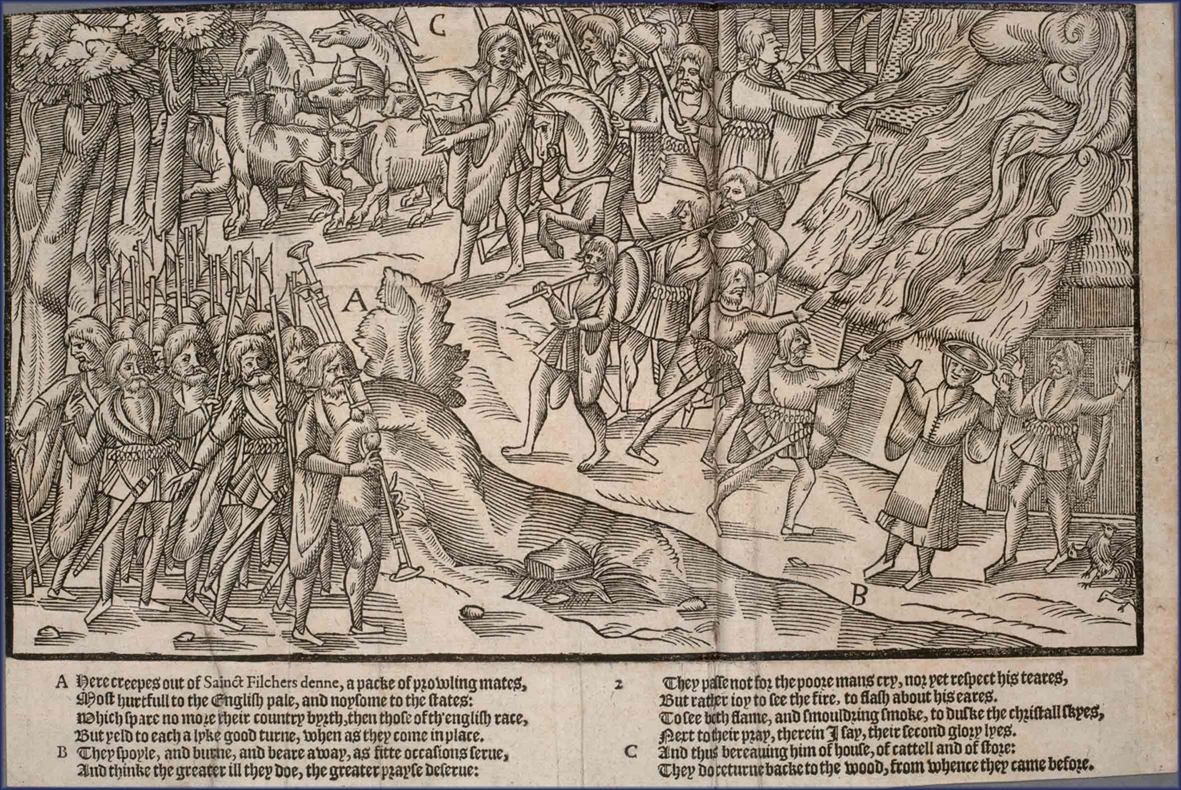
Depiction of a cattle raid in 16th century Gaelic Ireland – it is believed that the earthworks were built to prevent such raids

The earthworks usually consist of a bank with a ditch on either side. The bank is usually about 9 metres (30 ft) wide and the ditches are usually about 6 metres (20 ft) deep. Excavation of a stretch in County Monaghan revealed that the original construction was of a substantial timber palisade with external ditch. Behind the palisade was a double bank with intervening ditch. The timber structure was radiocarbon-dated to 390–370 BCE, so all of the earthworks may date to that period. Such dates confound the once popular theory that the earthworks were made in imitation of the Roman frontier in northern Britain.

Some have put forward the idea that the earthworks marked the ancient border of Ulster. However, there is no evidence that they "collectively constitute one border for one people" – the earthworks may not be contemporary and there are large gaps between them. Others suggest that their sole purpose was to prevent cattle raiding, which was very common in ancient Ireland. Two theories have been put forward to explain why there are large gaps between the earthworks. One is that they were simply built across trackways that were often used by cattle raiders, another is that the gaps between them were once heavily wooded and thus no manmade defence was needed.

== Locations ==
Black Pig's Dyke
(rough co-ordinates)

The remains of the earthworks can be found in the following places:

- North County Leitrim: running northwest-southeast, from Lough Melvin to Lough MacNean, near the villages of Rossinver and Kiltyclogher.
- Northeast County Longford: running northwest–southeast for 10 kilometres (6.2 mi), from Lough Gowna to Lough Kinale (crossing the N55), near the villages of Dring and Granard.
- County Cavan–County Monaghan border: running roughly west–east from the Finn River (near the village of Redhills) to the townland of Corrinshigo (near the village of Drum).
- County Cavan: forming a wide semi-circle in the townland of Ardkill More, 3½ miles east of Bellananagh. This is one of the best surviving examples. Cavan Heritage Group have called for the cessation of operations on a nearby quarry which they maintain is damaging part of the dyke at Ardkill More.
- County Fermanagh: part of linear earthwork in the south-east of Fermanagh, in Lislea townland (grid ref: H4836 2706) and in Mullynavannoge townland, (grid ref: H4838 2631 – H4850 2590) – Scheduled Historic Monuments

== See also ==
- The Pale
