= Orior Lower =

Orior Lower Na hOirthir Íochtaracha(Irish)
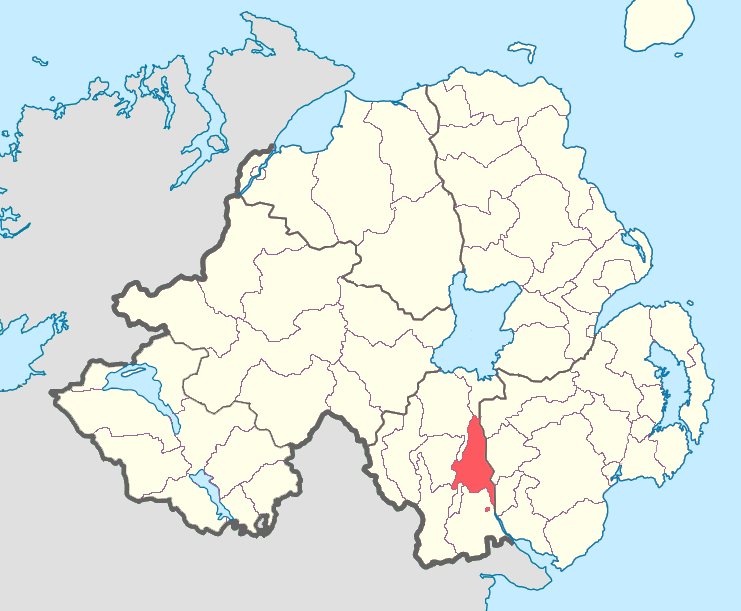
- Location of Orior Lower, County Armagh, Northern Ireland.
- Sovereign state: United Kingdom
- Country: Northern Ireland
- County: Armagh

Orior Lower (from Irish: Airthir, the name of an ancient Gaelic territory) is a barony in County Armagh, Northern Ireland. It lies in the east of the county and borders County Down with its eastern boundary. It is bordered by seven other baronies: Fews Upper to the south-west; Fews Lower to the west; Oneilland West to the north-west; Oneilland East to the north; Iveagh Lower, Lower Half to the north-east; Iveagh Upper, Upper Half to the east; and Orior Upper to the south. A small enclave of Orior Lower resides in the east of Orior Upper.

== List of main settlements ==
Below is a list of settlements within Orior Lower:

=== Towns ===
- Bessbrook
- Tandragee

=== Villages and population centres ===
- Eleven Lane Ends
- Clare
- Forkhill
- Poyntzpass (split with Iveagh Upper, Upper Half)
- Jerrettspass
- Laurelvale
- Loughgilly (also part in the baronies of Fews Lower and Orior Upper)

== List of civil parishes ==
Below is a list of civil parishes in Orior Lower:

- Ballymore
- Forkill
- Killevy (split with barony of Orior Upper)
- Kilmore (split with barony of Oneilland West, not be confused with separate civil parish of Kilmore in County Down)
- Loughgilly (split with baronies of Fews Upper and Orior Upper)
