= McCann (surname) =

Surname

McCann or MacCan or McHan is an Irish surname. It is derived from the Gaelic Mac Cana meaning "son of Cana". The Irish given name Cana literally means "cub", specifically alluding to a "wolf cub" (i.e. a young warrior). The Mac Cana were a Gaelic Irish clan who held the lands of Clancann and Clanbrassil, together known as Uí Nialláin or Oneilland, in what is now northern County Armagh. The surname is strongly associated with that part of Ulster.

According to Irish tradition they are a Milesian people descended from Colla-da-Chrioch, the first king of Airgialla. The family of the name Mac Cana, were known as lords of Clanbrassil. They were a branch of the Cenel nEoghain, the large group of Northern Uí Néill septs claiming descent from King Eógan mac Néill, the son of the High King Niall of the Nine Hostages. Amhlaoibh Mac Cana is mentioned in the Annals of the Four Masters. He was praised for his chivalry, his vigour, and his strong drink he made from apples in his orchard. The McCanns are also stated as having had a castle at Portadown in County Armagh. The last recorded Chief of the name, Donall MaCanna, was still known as lord of Clanbrassil as late as 1598. The title of lord of Clanbrassil is still held by the family of McCann in the area of County Louth.

The McCann line features in John O' Hart's 19th century historical book, Irish pedigrees. In this book, the McCann line along with other surname lines are taken right back to Adam and Eve.

According to historian C. Thomas Cairney, the MacCanns were a chiefly family of the Oirghialla or Airgíalla tribe who were in turn from the Laigin tribe who were the third wave of Celts to settle in Ireland during the first century BC.

Due to anglicization the original form Mac Cana has had many different variations, such as McGann, MacCanne, McCanne, MacCann, MacCan, Maccan.

The McCanne's spelt with an “e” on the end are from Scotland. Brothers William and Hugh McCanne originally native of Scotland moved to Ulster, Ireland. In 1752 they immigrated to America from Ulster via Dublin, Ireland and landed in what is now Wilmington, North Carolina. From there William's descendants moved to Georgia, Missouri, Utah, California, Texas, Colorado, Louisiana and many other states. Some who are descended from this line of McCanne now spell there name as McCann as the “e” was dropped from the name. It is unknown whether this line is connected to the McCanns who come from Ireland. It has also been written as MacCanne as well on various documents in the past. Many people who are descended from William and Hugh when spelling their surname tend to superscript the first c and align it with the M with either one or two horizontal lines under the superscript c. This is essentially an abbreviation of “Mac”. Pepsi Inventor Caleb Bradham's maternal line is descended from William McCanne, his mother's maiden name being McCann.

== People named McCann ==
McCann is the surname of Irish origin of several people, including:

- Austin McCann (born 1980), Scottish footballer
- Bert McCann (1932–2017), Scottish footballer
- Bill McCann (1892–1957), Australian soldier of World War I
- Bob McCann (born 1964), American basketball player
- Brian McCann (actor) (born 1965), American writer/actor/comedian
- Brian McCann (baseball) (born 1984), American baseball player
- Bryan McCann (born 1987), American football player
- Carole McCann, American academic
- Casey McCann (c. 1943–2000), British anti-cult activist
- Charles McCann (1899–1980), Indian naturalist
- Charles J. McCann (1926–2015), an American college president
- Chris McCann (born 1987), Irish footballer
- Chuck McCann (1934–2018), American actor
- Colum McCann (born 1965), Irish writer
- Denise McCann (born 1948) American-Canadian singer/songwriter and radio contributor
- Donal McCann (1943–1999), Irish actor
- E. Michael McCann (born 1936), an American attorney and politician
- Eamonn McCann (born 1943), Irish journalist, author, and political activist
- Fergus McCann (born 1941), Scottish-Canadian businessman and entrepreneur
- Gavin McCann (born 1978), English footballer
- Gerald McCann (born 1950), American politician
- Gordon J. McCann (1908–2000), Canadian horse trainer
- Grant McCann (born 1980), Northern Irish footballer
- Henry McCann (1887–?), Scottish footballer
- Howie McCann (born 1956), American baseball player and coach; father of Brian
- Hugh McCann (born 1954), Scottish footballer
- Jack McCann (1910–1972), British politician
- James McCann (disambiguation), multiple people by the name of James or Jim
- Jared McCann (born 1996), Canadian ice hockey player
- Jim McCann (born 1949), American football player
- John P. McCann (born 1952), American writer and producer
- Joe McCann (1947–1972), Irish Republican Army member
- Joseph McCann (academic) (1946–2015), American academic
- Joseph McCann (criminal) (born 1985), rapist
- Kate McCann, British political journalist
- Kerryn McCann (born 1967), Australian runner
- Kevin McCann, multiple people
- Les McCann (1935–2023), American musician
- Lila McCann (born 1981), American country music singer
- Madeleine McCann (born 2003), British girl who disappeared on 3 May 2007, in Portugal
- Maria McCann (born 1956), English novelist
- Martin McCann, multiple people
- Michael McCann, multiple people
- Neal McCann (1800–1866), American slave trader
- Neil McCann (born 1974), Scottish footballer
- Niamh McCann, multiple people
- Owen McCann (1907–1994), South African cardinal
- Peter McCann (1948–2023), American singer & songwriter
- Peter P. McCann, American philatelist
- Rachel McCann (field hockey) (born 1993), New Zealand field hockey player
- Renetta McCann (born 1956), American advertising executive
- Rory McCann (born 1969), Scottish actor
- Rory McCann (cricketer) (born 1985), Irish cricketer
- Sean McCann, multiple people
- Terrence McCann (1934–2006), American wrestler
- Terry McCann, fictional character played by Dennis Waterman in Minder
- Una D. McCann, American psychopharmacologist

== People named MacCann ==
- Philip MacCann (born 1969), Irish short story writer

== See also ==
- Dick McCann Memorial Award, for football reporting
- McCann Field House
- McCann's Steel Cut Irish Oatmeal
- McGann
- Irish clans
