= Battle of Julianstown =

Battle of the Irish Rebellion of 1641

Coordinates: 53.670222°N 6.280191°W

- Part of the Irish Rebellion
Date	27 November 1641
Location	Julianstown, County Meath
Result	Rebel victory

Belligerents
Kingdom of Ireland	Irish rebels

Commanders and leaders
Sir Patrick Wemyss; Sergeant Major Roper	Philip O'Reilly; Miles O'Reilly

Strength
650	3,000

Casualties and losses
500 killed or captured	Unknown

The Battle of Julianstown was fought on 27 November 1641 near Julianstown in County Louth during the Irish Rebellion of 1641. A force sent by the Dublin government to reinforce the garrison of Drogheda was ambushed by Irish rebels and nearly destroyed.

== Background ==
Ireland and Julianstown

At the beginning of the Irish Rebellion in October 1641, the rebels over ran most of Ulster before moving south towards Dublin. On 21 November, they besieged Drogheda and the Dublin government assembled reinforcements to support the garrison.

== The battle ==
The relief force was hastily put together and its soldiers largely untrained, many being half-starved refugees from the north who had been pressed into service. The detachment was commanded by Sir Patrick Wemyss and was composed of 50 horse and around 600 foot, led by Sergeant Major Roper. The rebel forces were led by Philip O'Reilly and Miles O'Reilly, both Irish leaders from County Cavan. Their force of 3,000 men including 300 horse had experienced commanders and appears to have been assigned to the south of Drogheda to complete the encirclement of the garrison.

On the morning of the battle, the rebels became aware of the approach of the government troops and prepared an ambush. When they sprang their trap, Wemyss mistakenly ordered his men to "countermarch" which caused them to move backwards as if they were retreating. The rebels took full advantage of the situation and immediately charged, causing panic and confusion among their opponents, many of whom threw down their weapons and attempted to escape. Although the cavalry entered Drogheda along with three companies of infantry, the rest were killed or captured.

== Aftermath ==
The completeness of their victory was an important morale boost for the Irish troops and helped to spread the revolt throughout Ireland. For the Earl of Ormond, newly appointed commander of the government army, the battle showed the determination of the rebels and the degree of support for their cause.

== See also ==
- Irish Rebellion of 1641
- Confederate Ireland
- Wars of the Three Kingdoms
- Irish battles

== Sources ==
- "1641 Depositions Timeline". Trinity College Dublin. Archived from the original on 6 December 2011.
- Hamilton, Lord Ernes (1920). The Irish Rebellion of 1641: With a History of the Events which Led Up to and Succeeded it. J. Murray.
- Manganiello, Stephen C (2004). The Concise Encyclopedia of the Revolutions and Wars of England, Scotland, and Ireland, 1639-1660. Scarecrow Press. ISBN 978-0810851009.
- Nicholas, Bernard (1736) [25 May 1642], The whole proceedings of the siege of Drogheda: To which is added, A true account of the siege of London-Derry, S. Hyde
- Perceval-Maxwell, M. (1994). Outbreak of the Irish Rebellion of 1641. Montreal & Kingston: McGill-Queen's Press - MQUP. ISBN 0-7735-1157-1.
- Plant, David (27 September 2007). "The Confederate War: Campaigns of 1641-2". BCW Project. David Plant.
