= McGann =

Surname

== Origin ==
McGann is an Irish surname, derived from the Gaelic MagAnnaidh, an Old Irish translation or sept of the Mac Cana clan.

== Etymology ==
The Cana particle is a personal name meaning 'cub/whelp', although some sources claim it is derived from the personal name Annadh. Due to anglicization and Ulster migration the original form Mac Cana has had many variations, such as MagAnnaidh, MacAnna and MacCanna, later anglicized to McGann and McCann. The name became McGann upon Ulster migration to Connaught and became Canny and Canney upon Ulster migration to the south (Leinster and Munster).

== Notable people named McGann ==
- Ambrose McGann (1868–1941), American baseball player
- Andrew J. McGann (1925–2008), American politician and businessman
- Bernie McGann (1937–2013), Australian jazz alto saxophone player
- Brad McGann (1964–2007), New Zealand film director and screenwriter
- Ciarán McGann, Irish hurler from Castlelyons, County Cork
- Dennis Lawrence "Dan" McGann (1871–1910), American baseball player
- Gary McGann (born 1950), Irish businessman
- Jake McGann, English actor
- James McGann (1955–2021), American academic known for research on think tanks
- Jerome McGann (born 1937), American academic and textual scholar
- John R. McGann (1924–2002), American Catholic bishop
- Joseph McGann, British music producer
- Lawrence E. McGann (1852–1928), American politician
- Oisín McGann, Irish writer and illustrator
- Preston McGann, American football player

The McGann acting family consists of four brothers:

- Joe McGann
- Paul McGann
- Mark McGann
- Stephen McGann

== See also ==
- McGinn
- McCann (surname)
- Bryan McGan (1848–1894) Australian cricketer

Macan, John David (1997) MacCana of Clanbrassil an ancestral and family history, Published by John Macan, Queensland.
