= Confederate Oath of Association =

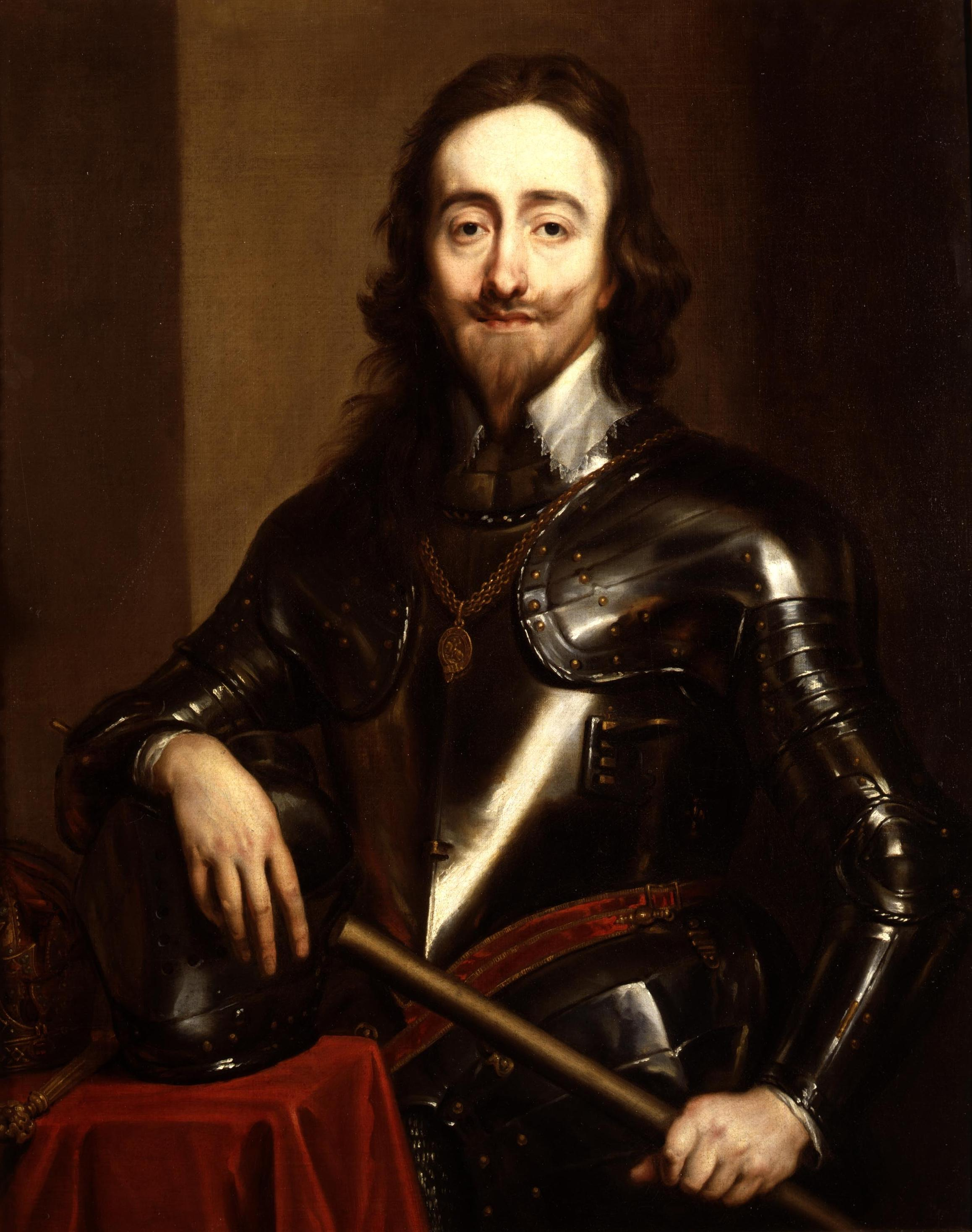
Irish Confederates pledged allegiance to Charles I of Ireland.

The Confederate Oath of Association was an oath of allegiance made by Irish Confederate Catholics during the Wars of the Three Kingdoms (1638–1653).

An oath was drafted at a synod at Kilkenny in May 1642. It emphasised the Confederates' loyalty to the Stuart monarchy, their unity, their commitment to protect each other's property rights and their desire for equality of religious practises. From the Execution of Charles I in 1649 its acceptance of royal power extended to his son Charles II of England.

== Background ==
The roots of the "oath of association" lay in the wider Wars of Religion during the 17th century, and the then recent Tudor conquest of Ireland which saw the status of much of the Hiberno-Norman and Gaelic Irish gentry challenged, and some of whom were not fully assimilated into the nobility of the new Kingdom of Ireland. The Plantation of Ulster also saw the seizure of much land, to the dismay of the native Irish. Religious differences were also an issue, with the Irish remaining mostly Catholic, and the newly planted families being either Presbyterian, Anglican or Puritan. From October 1641, the Irish Rebellion of 1641 saw an open attempt by the Irish Catholic gentry to retake power in Ireland, with many believing they had been royally authorised by the Proclamation of Dungannon.

An oath was drafted at a synod at Kilkenny in May 1642. It emphasised the Confederates' loyalty to the Stuart monarchy, their unity, their commitment to protect each other's property rights and their desire for equality of religious practises. From the Execution of Charles I in 1649 its acceptance of royal power extended to his son Charles II of England.

Although not a complete success, the Confederates (as they would later be known) established four strongholds across the island — around Ulster under Phelim O'Neill; around The Pale under Thomas Preston, 1st Viscount Tara; in the south east under Richard Butler, 3rd Viscount Mountgarret; and in the south west under Donagh MacCarthy, Viscount Muskerry. Following this, the Scottish Covenanters drove O'Neill's forced out from Ulster, while English Royalists took care of the Pale. In response, the Irish, in the areas that they still held, proclaimed a Confederate Ireland with its capital at Kilkenny. A constitution was drawn up by lawyer Patrick D'Arcy. An Oath of Association was also written, under which the Confederates accepted Charles I of the House of Stuart as their sovereign. They also wished to secure the restoration of Catholic churches and overturn all anti-Catholic measures.

== Oath ==
=== Transcription ===
I, A.B., do profess, swear, and protest before God and His saints and angels, the I will, during my life, bear true faith and allegiance to my Sovereign Lord, Charles, by the grace of God, King of Great Britain, France and Ireland, and to his heirs and lawful successors; and that I will, to my power, during my life, defend, uphold and maintain, all his and their just prerogatives, estates, and rights, the power and privilege of the Parliament of this realm, the fundamental laws of Ireland, the free exercise of the Roman Catholic faith and religion throughout this land; and the lives, just liberties, possessions, estates, and rights of all those that have taken, or that shall take this Oath, and perform the contents thereof; and that I will obey and ratify all the orders and decrees made, and to be made, by the Supreme Council of the Confederate Catholics of this Kingdom, concerning the said public cause; and I will not seek, directly or indirectly, any pardon or protection for any act done, or to be done, touching this general cause, without the consent of the major part of the said Council; and that I will not, directly or indirectly, do any act or acts that shall prejudice the said cause, but will, to the hazard of my life and estate, assist, prosecute and maintain the same.

Moreover, I do further swear that I will not accept of, or submit unto any peace, made, or to be made, with the said Confederate Catholics, without the consent and approbation of the General Assembly of the said Confederate Catholics, and for the preservation and strengthening of the association and union of the kingdom. That upon any peace or accommodation to be made, or concluded with the said Confederate Catholics as aforesaid, I will, to the utmost of my power, insist upon and maintain the ensuing propositions, until a peace, as aforesaid, be made, and the matters to be agreed upon in the articles of peace be established and secured by Parliament.

So help me God and His holy gospel.

— Confederate Oath of Association, 1642.

=== Original spelling ===
Whereas the Romish Catholiques of this Kingdome of Ireland haue beine inforced to take Armes for the nesessarye defence & preseruacion as well of theire Religion plotted and by manyfold practices endeauoured to be quitt suppressed by the puritane faction as likewise theire liues Estates and lybertyes as alsoe for the defence and safeguard of his Maiesties Regall Powers iust perogatiues honnors Estates and rights invaded vpon, And for that it is requisite that there should bee an vnanimous Consent and reall vnion betweene all the Catholiques of this realme to maytayne the [?] and strengthen them agaynst theire aduersaries: It is thought fitt that they and whosoever shall adhere vnto theire partie As a confederate should for the Better asureance of theire adhereing fydellitye and Constantie to the publique Cause take this ensueing oath:

I A.B. doe promise sweare and protest before God & his saynts and Angells Charles by the grace of God King of greate Britaine ffrance and Ireland and to his heires and lawfull successors And that I will to my power during my lyfe defend vphold and mayntayne all his & theire iust prerogatives Estates and rights the power and privilidge of the Parliament of this Realme The fundamentall lawes of Ireland the free exercise of the Romish Catholiqe fayth and religion through out this land, And the liues iust lybertyes possessions Estates and Ryghts of all those that haue taken or shall take this oath and performe the Contents thereof And that I will obey and ratifye all the orders and decrees made and to be made by the Supreame Councell of the Confederate Catholiques of this Kingdome concerning the publique Cause

And that I will not seeke or receive directly or indirectly any pardon or proteccion for any act done or to be done touching this gennerall Cause without the Consent of the Maior parte of the said Councell And that I will not directly or indirectly doe any Act or Acts that shall prediudice the said Cause Butt will to the hazard of my lyfe and estate asist prosecute and mayntayne the same soe help me God & his holy Gosspell.

— Confederate Oath of Association, 1642.
