= Mac Cana =

Ancient Gaelic tribe

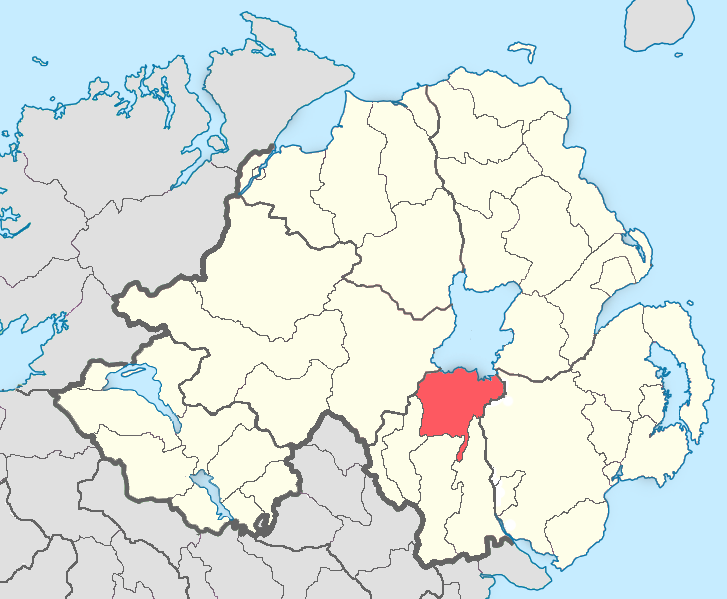
The Mac Cana had become chiefs of Oneilland (highlighted) by the 16th century

The Mac Cana or Maccan were a Gaelic Irish clan who held lands in Clancann and Clanbrasil in what is now northern County Armagh, and had the title of 'Lords of Clanbrasil'. It is the origin of the surname McCann and Maccan.

== Etymology ==
The name Mac Cana means "son of Cana". This literally means "cub/whelp", and is claimed to be a term for a young warrior.

== History ==
The Mac Cana originated as chiefs of Cenél Aengusa, the name of a kindred and its territory in Tír Eoghain. In the 12th and 13th centuries they extended their lands along the south of Lough Neagh where they gave their name to the territory of Clancann (Clann Chana), later the barony of Oneilland West. This lay in northern County Armagh between the River Bann and River Blackwater. They also became chiefs of the neighbouring territory of Clanbrassil (Clann Bhreasail), east of the Bann, later the barony of Oneilland East. The main settlement in Clanbrassil, Lurgan, was originally named Lorgain Bhaile Mhic Cana ("ridge of Mac Cana's townland"). Nearby Portadown (Port an Dúnáin) is believed to be named after a fort of the Mac Cana. An English map from the early 1600s shows a prominent house at Maghery in Clancann, which was probably the last residence of the Mac Cana chiefs.

The Mac Cana and their neighbours were vassals of the powerful O'Neill dynasty of Tyrone. During the Nine Years' War (1594–1603), the O'Neills and their allies fought against English expansion in Ireland. Following the English victory and Flight of the Earls, the English seized the lands of the O'Neills and their allies. This would seem to include the Mac Cana. This land was colonized by English-speaking Protestant settlers from Britain, during the plantation of Ulster.

During the Irish Rebellion of 1641, the Mac Cana re-took Lurgan and Portadown from the settlers. Irish rebels killed about 100 captured British settlers at Portadown by forcing them off the bridge into the River Bann, and shooting those who tried to swim to safety. Known as the Portadown massacre, it was the biggest such massacre during the rebellion. The rebels were likely under the command of Toole McCann. Following the Irish Confederate Wars and Cromwellian conquest of Ireland, the area was re-taken by the English. Toole McCann was captured and executed by English forces in 1653, although he denied ordering the massacre.

Under the Act for the Settlement of Ireland 1652, Irish rebels and many native Irish Catholics lost most of their land. Some were given poorer lands in Connaught or County Clare, and others were exiled from Ireland. This may be the origin of the McGanns, an anglicised Connaught variant of 'Mac Cana'.

Due to anglicization the original form Mac Cana has had many different variations, such as McGann, MacCann, MacCan, Maccan, MacCana, and became Canny and Canney upon Ulster migration to the south (Leinster and Munster).
