= Irish Rebellion of 1641 =

Rebellion by Catholics

- Part of the Irish Confederate Wars
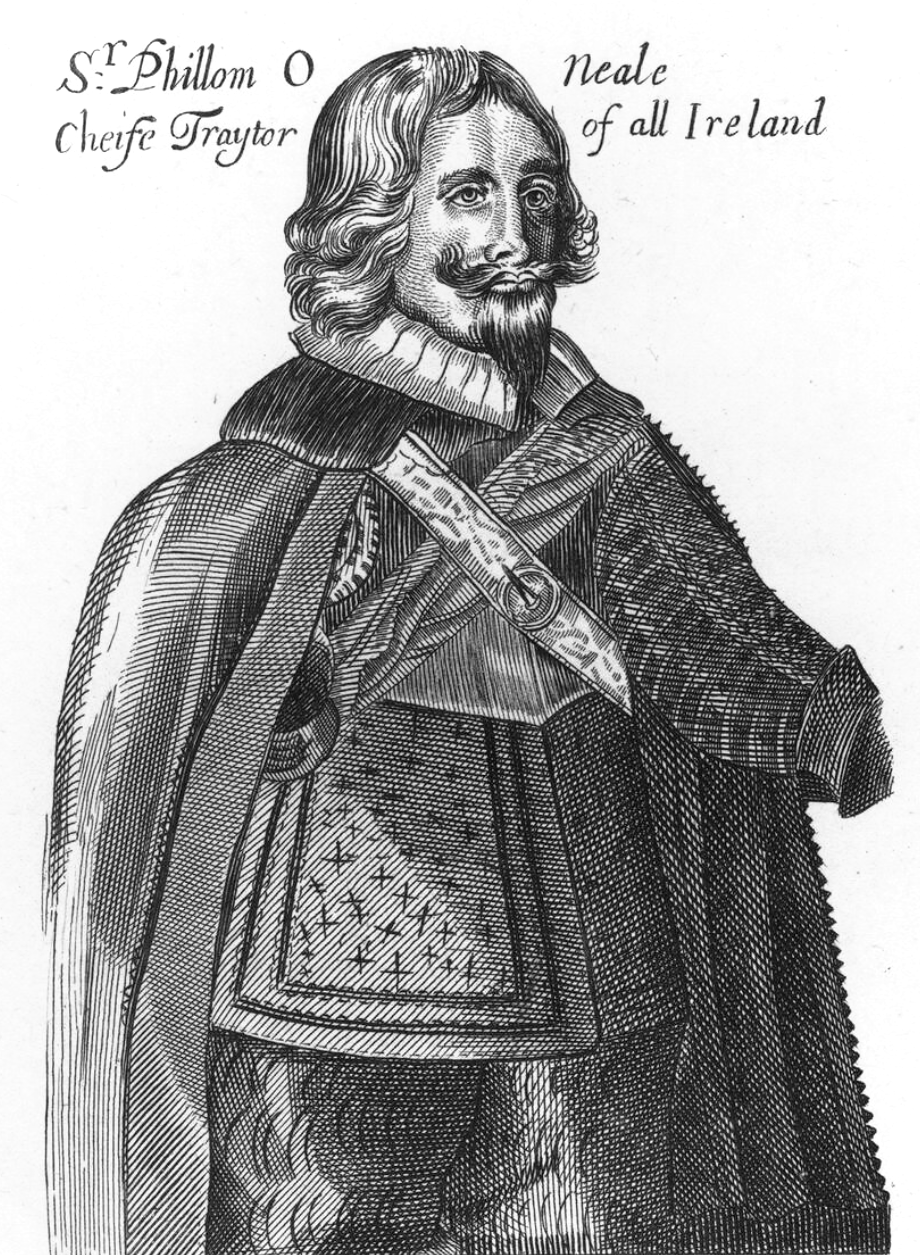
- Felim O'Neill of Kinard, leader of the rebellion
Date	23 October 1641 – May 1642 (7 months)
Location	Ireland
Result	Founding of Confederate Ireland and beginning of the Irish Confederate Wars

Belligerents
Confederate Ireland Supported by: Papal States	England; Ireland Scotland

Commanders and leaders
Felim O'Neill; Rory O'Moore; Donough MacCarty; Connor Maguire; Rory Maguire; Philip O'Reilly; Owen Roe O'Neill	William St Leger; James Butler; Charles Coote; (Kingdom of Scotland) Robert Monro

The Irish Rebellion of 1641 (Note: Irish: Éirí Amach 1641) began on 23 October 1641. Initiated by Irish gentry and military officers, the rebellion sought to end English domination of Ireland, restore lands confiscated through the plantations of Ireland, and secure Irish control over the country's government and affairs. Planned as a swift coup d'état to gain control of the Protestant-dominated central government, it instead developed into the 1641–1653 Irish Confederate Wars, part of the wider Wars of the Three Kingdoms.

Despite failing to seize Dublin Castle, rebels under Felim O'Neill quickly over-ran most of Ulster, centre of the most recent land confiscations. O'Neill then issued the Proclamation of Dungannon, a forgery claiming he had been authorised by Charles I of England to secure Ireland against his opponents in England and Scotland. Many Royalist Anglo-Irish Catholics responded by joining the uprising, and the rebellion spread throughout Ireland.

In November, rebels besieged Drogheda and defeated a government relief force at Julianstown. Especially in Ulster, thousands of Protestant settlers were expelled or massacred, and Catholics were killed in retaliation. By April 1642, Royalist troops held Dublin, Cork, and large areas around them, with much of Ulster occupied by a Scottish Covenanter army and local Protestant militia. This left approximately two thirds of Ireland under rebel control.

In May 1642, Ireland's Catholic bishops met at Kilkenny, and declared the rebellion a just war. Along with members of the Catholic nobility, they created an alternative government known as Confederate Ireland. For the next ten years, the Confederacy fought a four-sided war against Irish Royalists, Scottish Covenanters and English Parliamentarians.

== Causes ==
The roots of the 1641 rebellion derived from the colonisation that followed the Tudor conquest of Ireland, and the alienation of the Catholic gentry from the newly-Protestant English state in the decades following. Historian Aidan Clarke writes that religion "was merely one aspect of a larger problem posed by the Gaelic Irish, and its importance was easily obscured; but religious difference was central to the relationship between the government and the colonists". During the decades between the end of the Elizabethan wars in 1603 and the outbreak of rebellion in 1641, the political position of the wealthier landed Irish Catholics was increasingly threatened by the English government of Ireland. As a result, both the Gaelic Irish, and the Old English communities increasingly defined themselves as Irish and were viewed as such by the newcomers.

The pre-Elizabethan population of Ireland is usually divided into the native Irish and Old English, many of whom were descendants of medieval English and Anglo-Normans settlers. These groups were historically antagonistic, with English settled areas such as the Pale around Dublin, Wexford, and other walled towns being fortified against the rural Gaelic clans. By the 17th century, the cultural divide between these groups, especially at elite social levels, was narrowing; many of the Old English spoke Irish, patronised Irish poetry and music, and have been described as being "More Irish than the Irish themselves". Writing in 1614, one author claimed that previously the Old English "despised the mere Irish, accounting them a barbarous people, void of civility and religion and [each viewed] the other as a hereditary enemy" but cited intermarriage "in former ages rarely seen", education of the Gaelic Irish and "the late plantation of New English and Scottish [throughout] the Kingdom whom the natives repute a common enemy; but this last is the principal cause of their union". In addition, the native population became defined by their shared Catholicism, as opposed to the Protestantism of the new settlers. (Note: Religion often took precedence over community links; James Butler, 1st Duke of Ormond, a member of one of the leading Old English families, and the Gaelic Irish Murrough O'Brien, 1st Earl of Inchiquin, were both Protestant converts who played prominent roles in suppressing the rebellion)

=== Plantations ===
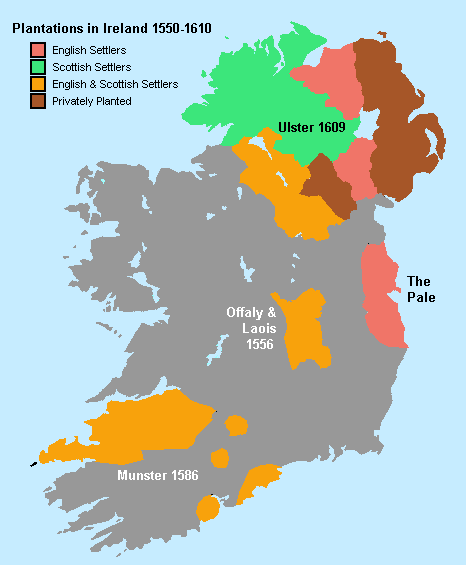
Ireland in 1609, showing the major Plantations of Ireland

The Tudor conquest of the late 16th and early 17th century led to the Plantations of Ireland, whereby Irish-owned land was confiscated and colonised with British settlers. The biggest was the Plantation of Ulster, which utilised estates confiscated from the northern lords who went into exile in 1607. Around 80% of these were distributed to English-speaking Protestants, with the remainder going to "deserving" native Irish lords and clans. By 1641, the economic impact of the plantations on the native Irish population was exacerbated because many who retained their estates had to sell them due to poor management and the debts they incurred. This erosion of their status and influence saw them prepared to join a rebellion, even if they risked losing more.

Many of the exiles, such as Eoghan Ruadh Ó Néill, served in the Catholic armies of France and Spain, particularly the Army of Flanders. They formed a small émigré Irish community, militantly hostile to the English-run Protestant state in Ireland, but restrained by the generally good relations England had with Spain and France after 1604. In Ireland itself, resentment caused by the plantations was one of the main causes for the outbreak and spread of the rebellion, combined with Poynings' Law, which required Irish legislation to be approved by the Privy Council of England. The Protestant-dominated administration took opportunities to confiscate more land from longstanding Catholic landowners. In the late 1630s Thomas Wentworth, the Lord Deputy of Ireland, proposed a new round of plantations designed to expand Protestant cultural and religious dominance. Delays in their implementation caused by Charles' struggles with his political opponents in England and Scotland meant that Catholics still owned over 60% of land in 1641.

=== Religious discrimination ===
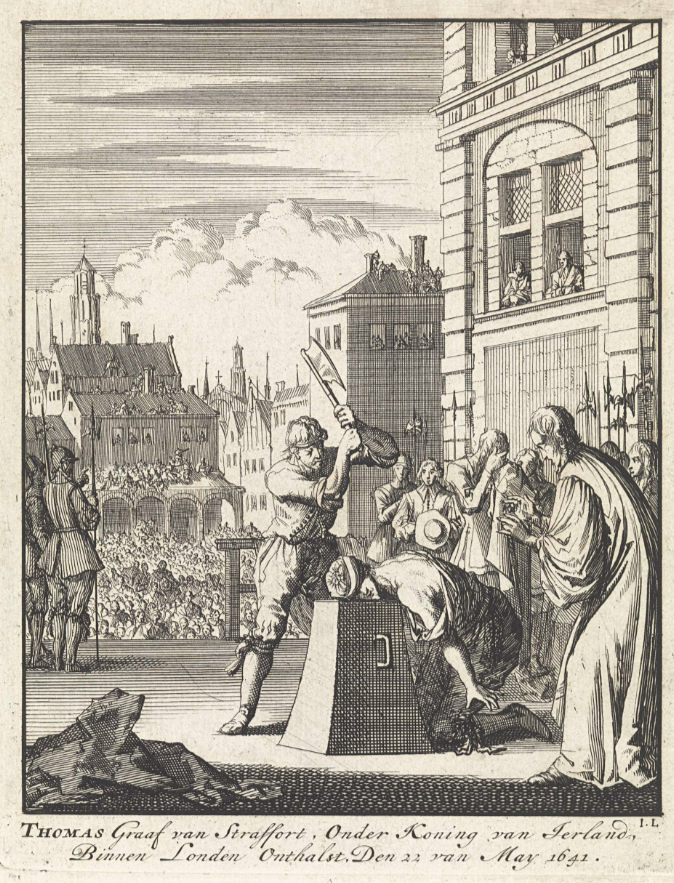
Etching, by Jan Luyken, depicting the execution of Thomas Wentworth, 1st Earl of Strafford in May 1641

Most of the Irish Catholic upper classes were not opposed to the sovereignty of Charles I over Ireland but wanted to be full subjects and maintain their pre-eminent position in Irish society. This was prevented by their religion and the threat of losing their land in the Plantations. The failed Gunpowder Plot of 1605 had led to further legal discrimination against Catholics.

The Protestant Church of Ireland was the only approved form of worship, although it was a minority even among Irish Protestants, many of whom were Presbyterians. Both they and the majority Catholic population were required to pay tithes to the church, causing great resentment, while practicing Catholicism in public could lead to arrest, and non-attendance at Protestant service was punishable by recusant fines. Catholics could not hold senior offices of state, or serve above a certain rank in the army. The Privy Council of Ireland was dominated by English Protestants. The constituencies of the Irish House of Commons gave Protestants a majority.

In response, the Irish Catholic upper classes sought 'The Graces', and appealed directly first to James I and then his son Charles, for full rights as subjects and toleration of their religion. On several occasions, they seemed to have reached an agreement under which these demands would be met in return for raising taxes. However, despite paying increased taxes after 1630, Charles postponed implementing their demands until 3 May 1641 when he and the English Privy Council instructed the Lords Justices of Ireland to publish the required Bills.

The advancement of the Graces were particularly frustrated during the time that Wentworth was Lord Deputy. On the pretext of checking of land titles to raise revenue, Wentworth confiscated and was going to plant lands in counties Roscommon and Sligo and was planning further plantations in counties Galway and Kilkenny directed mainly at the Anglo-Irish Catholic families. In the judgement of historian Pádraig Lenihan, "It is likely that he [Wentworth] would have eventually encountered armed resistance from Catholic landowners" if he had pursued these policies further. However, the actual rebellion followed the destabilisation of English and Scottish politics and the weakened position of the king in 1640. Wentworth was executed in London in May 1641.

=== Conspiracy ===
From 1638 to 1640 Scotland rose in a revolt known as the Bishops' Wars against Charles I's attempt to impose Church of England practices there, believing them to be too close to Catholicism. The King's attempts to put down the rebellion failed when the English Long Parliament, which had similar religious concerns to the Scots, refused to vote for new taxes to pay for raising an army. Charles therefore started negotiations with Irish Catholic gentry to recruit an Irish army to put down the rebellion in Scotland, in return for granting longstanding requests for religious toleration and land security. Composed largely of Irish Catholics from Ulster, an army was slowly mobilised at Carrickfergus opposite the Scottish coast, but then began to be disbanded in mid-1641. To the Scots and Parliament of England, this seemed to confirm that Charles was a tyrant, who wanted to impose his religious views on his kingdoms, and to govern again without his parliaments as he had done in 1628–1640. In early 1641, some Scots and English Parliamentarians even proposed invading Ireland and subduing Catholics there, to ensure that no royalist Irish Catholic army would land in England or Scotland.

Frightened by this, and wanting to seize the opportunity, a small group of Irish Catholic landed gentry (some of whom were Members of Parliament) plotted to take Dublin Castle and other important towns and forts around the country in a quick coup in the name of the King, both to forestall a possible invasion and to force him to concede the Catholics' demands. At least three Irish colonels were also involved in the plot, and the plotters hoped to use soldiers from the disbanding Irish army.

=== Economics ===
Unfavourable economic conditions also contributed to the outbreak of the rebellion. This decline may have been a consequence of the Little Ice Age event of the mid 17th Century. The Irish economy had hit a recession and the harvest of 1641 was poor. Interest rates in the 1630s had been as high as 30% per annum. The leaders of the rebellion like Phelim O'Neill and Rory O'Moore were heavily in debt and risked losing their lands to creditors. What was more, the Irish farmers were hard hit by the bad harvest and were faced with rising rents. This aggravated their desire to remove the settlers and contributed to the widespread attacks on them at the start of the rebellion. A creditor of O'Neill's, "Mr Fullerton of Loughal ... was one of the first to be murdered in the rebellion".

== Rebellion ==
The 1641 Rebellion; key locations

The rebellion was planned by a small group of Catholic landed gentry and military officers, many of whom were Gaelic Irish from Ulster who had lost lands and influence in the post 1607 Plantation. Due to take place on Saturday 23 October 1641, (Note: After the 1660 Stuart Restoration, the Parliament of Ireland made 23 October an annual day of thanksgiving via the Observance of 23rd October Act 1662 (14 & 15 Chas. 2 Sess. 4. c. 23 (I)).) armed men led by Connor Maguire and Rory O'Moore were to seize Dublin Castle and its arsenal, then hold it until help came from insurgents in neighbouring County Wicklow. Meanwhile, Felim O'Neill and his allies were to occupy strategic points in Ulster.

The English garrison of Ireland was only about 2,000 strong and scattered around the country, but the plot relied on surprise rather than force to achieve their objectives, after which they would issue their demands, in expectation of support from the rest of the country. The plan to seize Dublin Castle was foiled when one of the ringleaders, Hugh Og MacMahon, revealed details to his foster-brother, a Protestant convert named Owen O'Connolly. He promptly informed one of the Lord Justices, and MacMahon and Maguire were arrested, while the remaining plotters slipped out of Dublin. Warnings of an imminent rising had also been communicated to Dublin by Sir William Cole.

Despite this failure, the rebellion in Ulster went ahead and Felim O'Neill and his allies, including Rory Maguire, quickly captured positions throughout the province, including Dungannon, Charlemont Fort, Newry, Tandragee, Portadown, Mountjoy Castle, Castleblaney and Carrickmacross. Those that did not surrender, such as Enniskillen Castle, were besieged and within two days the insurgents held most of counties Armagh, Tyrone, Fermanagh and Monaghan. The Proclamation of Dungannon, issued by O'Neill on 24 October, stated they had taken up arms only to defend their freedoms and meant no harm to the king's subjects. This was followed on 4 November by the Newry declaration which claimed Charles had approved the rising to secure Ireland against his opponents in England.

Although the declaration is now accepted as a forgery, many of the Anglo-Catholic gentry were dismayed by indiscriminate anti-Catholic measures taken by the Dublin authorities, including those who had initially condemned the rebellion. The suspension of the Irish Parliament on 17 November deprived them of the political means to resolve these issues and the declaration provided cover for moderates such as Nicholas Plunkett to make common cause with the rebels. Rumours also circulated that radical Protestants were seeking to replace Charles I with his exiled German nephew the Elector Palatine, paving the way for increased repression of Irish Catholics.

The influential Lords of the Pale joined the rising in early December, while rebels in Cavan were led by Philip O'Reilly, the local Member of Parliament, and Mulmore O'Reilly, the High Sheriff. Dundalk was occupied, while an army under Brian McMahon moved south from Ulster towards Dublin and on 21 November besieged Drogheda from the north. Others advanced through County Meath and blockaded the town from the south, then defeated a relief force sent from Dublin at Julianstown on 29 November, inflicting over 600 casualties. On 28 November, around 8,000 rebels besieged Lisnagarvey but after losing some 300 men in an unsuccessful assault, they set fire to the town and retreated. This setback and the stubbornness displayed by the town's defenders allegedly made a deep impression on the attackers, since it showed hopes of a quick and relatively painless victory in Ulster were over optimistic.

Further south, the rebellion spread into counties Leitrim, Longford, Wicklow, Wexford, Tipperary and Kildare. The Dublin government called it "a most disloyal and detestable conspiracy" by "some evil affected Irish Papists", which was aimed at "a general massacre of all English and Protestant inhabitants". In December, troops led by Charles Coote, Governor of Dublin Castle, and William St Leger, Lord President of Munster, attacked rebel-held areas in counties Wicklow and Tipperary respectively, expeditions characterised by "excessive and indiscriminate brutality" against the general Catholic population. This provoked many into joining the insurgency, including previously peaceful Munster where St Leger had imposed a brutal martial law regime.

=== Ulster massacres ===
When the rebellion began, Phelim O'Neill sought to exploit divisions between English and Scots settlers by offering the latter protection, hoping thereby to gain their support. This strategy initially contributed to the rapid spread of the revolt, in part because the Dublin government was uncertain whom to trust and thus delayed a coordinated response. The situation changed when it became clear the rising had been only partially successful, while the breakdown of state authority prompted widespread attacks by the Catholic peasantry on Protestants, regardless of nationality. (Note: "But on the 23rd and the 24th and 25th of October 1641, the popular attacks which are relatively spontaneous, are clearly focused upon the tenants who had moved in and become beneficiaries of the Plantation; and that these actions, as well as the words which are articulated in justifying those actions – targeted attacks upon those who had moved in and benefited from the Plantation – these indicate that there was a popular sentiment of dispossession which was articulated in action as well as in words when the opportunity provided itself, when the political order was challenged.") They were soon joined by members of the gentry; O'Neill's authority was largely confined to County Armagh and even there was not total, his own brother being one of those who took part in these actions.

A contemporary Catholic source wrote that O'Neill "strove to contain the raskall multitude from those frequent savage actions of stripping and killing" but "the floodgate of rapine, once being laid open, the meaner sort of people was not to be contained". It has been argued the initial purpose of the attacks was economic and killings occurred only when the victims resisted. They intensified as the rebellion progressed, particularly in Ulster where many had lost land in the post 1607 Plantations, while attacks on local Protestant clergy were in part due to resentment at the relative wealth of the Church of Ireland in that province. Other factors included religion and culture; in County Cavan, rebels justified the rising as a defensive measure against a Protestant threat to "extirpate the Catholic religion", reinstated original Irish language place names and banned the use of English.

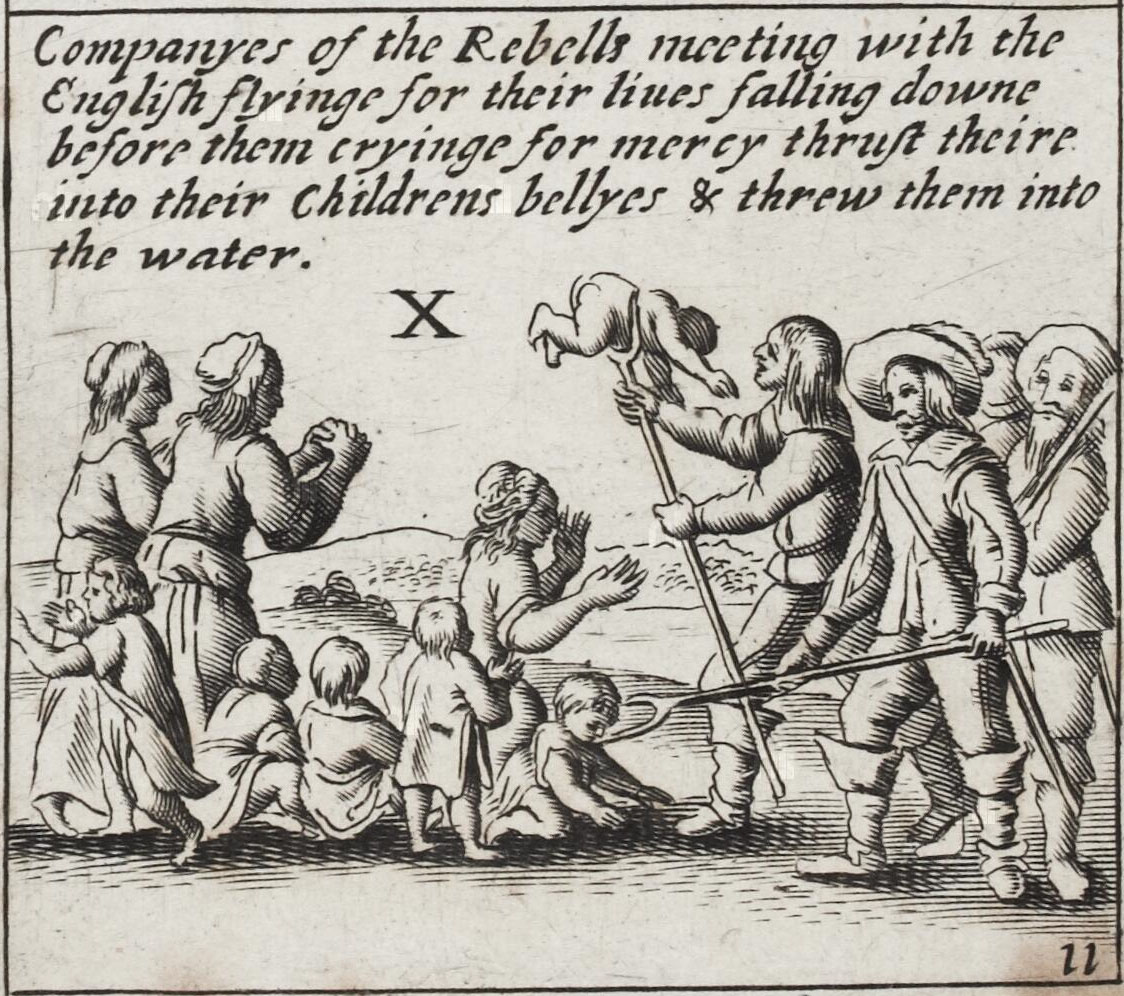
English atrocity propaganda of alleged rebel attacks on women and children

Following their repulse at Lisnagarvey in November, rebels killed about 100 Protestants at Portadown by forcing them off the bridge into the River Bann, and shooting those who tried to swim to safety. (Note: A deposition made by one William Clarke claimed "about 100 Protestants (including women and children) from the nearby parish of Loughal, who were already prisoners" were killed.) Known as the Portadown massacre, it was one of the bloodiest such events to take place in Ireland during the 1640s. In nearby Kilmore, English and Scottish men, women and children were burned to death in the cottage in which they were imprisoned, while in Armagh as a whole, some 1,250 died in the early months of the rebellion, roughly a quarter of the local settler population. In County Tyrone, modern research has identified three blackspots for the killing of settlers, the worst being near Kinard, "where most of the British families planted... were ultimately murdered". Elsewhere at Shrule in County Mayo, Protestant prisoners were killed by their Catholic escorts, despite attempts by their officers to intervene.

Killings of Catholics also took place, including the murder of two dozen at Islandmagee by members of the Carrickfergus garrison in November 1641. The arrival of a Covenanter army in Ulster in April 1642 led to further such atrocities, William Lecky, a 19th-century historian of the rebellion, concluding "it is far from clear on which side the balance of cruelty rests". The Scots executed Irish prisoners taken in a skirmish near Kilwarlin woods outside Dromore, while James Turner records that after retaking Newry, local Catholics were lined up on the banks of the Newry River and killed "without any legal process". On Rathlin Island, Scottish soldiers from Clan Campbell were encouraged by their commanding officer Sir Duncan Campbell to kill the local Catholic MacDonnells, who were related to the Campbells' enemies in Scotland, Clan MacDonald. They threw scores of MacDonnell women over cliffs to their deaths. The killings were brought under some degree of control by Owen Roe O'Neill, who in July 1642 was given command of Irish forces in Ulster and hanged several rebels for attacking civilians. Though still brutal, the war thereafter was fought according to the code of conduct both O'Neill and the Scottish commander Robert Monro had learned as professional soldiers in mainland Europe.

Contemporary pamphlets published in London contained lurid details of the massacres and suggested over 200,000 Protestants (more than the entire settler population) had lost their lives. These figures were recognised even then as wildly exaggerated and in November 1641 Parliament jailed a publisher who admitted paying for fictitious atrocity tales. Recent research suggests around 4,000 were killed in the attacks, with thousands more expelled from their homes, many of whom died of exposure or disease, leading to an upper estimate of around 12,000 deaths. This represents around 10% of the total settler population in Ireland, though in Ulster the ratio of deaths would have been somewhat higher, namely around 30%. They were used to support the view of the rebellion as a Catholic conspiracy to wipe out all Protestants in Ireland, a narrative constructed in the Depositions, a collection of victim reports gathered between 1642 and 1655 and now housed in Trinity College Dublin. In 1646, these accounts were summarised in The Irish Rebellion, a book by John Temple, in which he urged the military re-conquest of Ireland and segregation of Irish Catholics from British Protestants.

In the long term, the 1641 massacres intensified existing sectarian animosity on both sides, although modern historians argue the killings had an especially powerful psychological impact on the Protestant community. (Note: Dr. Raymond Gillespie of the National University of Ireland, Maynooth, "I think in some ways it's what happens after the Plantation which is much more important for the enduring legacy. It's the fears of the Irish which are created in 1641, the fear of massacre, the fear of attack, that somehow or other accommodations which had been made before were no longer possible after that because the Irish were quite simply, as John Temple put it in his history of the rebellion 'untrustworthy'. And that book was repeatedly reprinted – I think the last time it was reprinted was 1912, so that this message (the message not of the Plantation but the message of the rebellion) is the one that persists and the one which is used continuously right through the 19th century – that the Catholics are untrustworthy; that we can't do business with them; we shouldn't be involved with them; they are part of a large conspiracy to do us down") Dr. Mary O'Dowd wrote they "were very traumatic for the Protestant settler community in Ulster, and left long-term scars within that community". Contemporary Protestant accounts depict the rebellion as a complete surprise; one stated that it was "conceived among us and yet we never felt it kick in the womb, nor struggle in the birth". Many argued Catholics could not be trusted and in Ulster, Protestants commemorated the anniversary of the rebellion for over two hundred years. According to historian Pádraig Lenihan, this "helped affirm communal solidarity and emphasise the need for unrelenting vigilance [against] the masses of Irish Catholics surrounding them [who] were and always would be, unregenerate and cruel enemies".

=== English and Scottish intervention ===
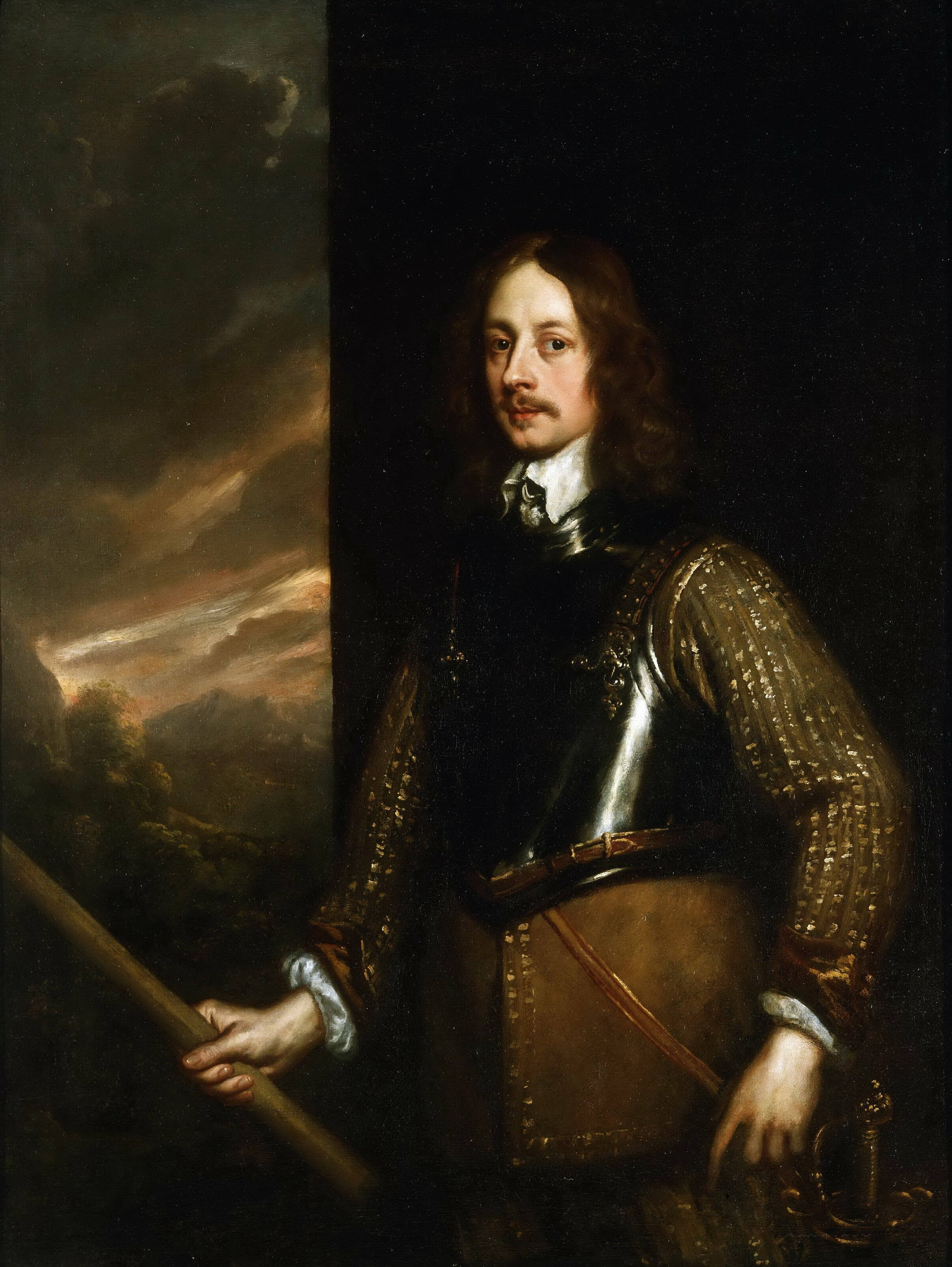
James Butler, Duke of Ormond, who commanded the royal army during the rebellion

Although Charles, the English Parliament and Scottish Covenanter government all agreed the rebellion should be crushed, doing so was delayed by political tensions. Charles was in Edinburgh when he received news of the uprising on 28 October and immediately urged the Scots to send troops to Ulster, once approved by their colleagues in England. (Note: Since Ireland was subordinate to English political authority, only they could sanction intervention) On 4 November, Parliament voted to send weapons and gunpowder to Ireland and recruit 8,000 men to suppress the rising but the situation was complicated since any such army would be legally controlled by the king. A series of alleged Royalist military conspiracies in 1641 and rebel claims that Charles supported their actions heightened fears he would turn it against his opponents in England and Scotland, rather than the Irish.

The Covenanters urged the English Parliament to fund a Scottish army rather than recruiting their own, arguing it could reach Ireland more easily and would be independent of both Charles and his Parliamentary opponents. In the meantime, Charles sent weapons, gunpowder and a small number of Scots volunteers to Ireland at his own expense, but had insufficient money to finance an expedition on his own. James Butler, 1st Duke of Ormond, a member of one of the leading Old English families and Protestant convert, was made commander of Royal forces in Ireland and recruited three infantry regiments from the refugees flooding into Dublin. Several prominent Ulster Scots were also commissioned to raise troops, including Robert Stewart and his brother William, who formed the Laggan Army.

Many politicians and officials in Dublin and London opposed Scottish intervention in Ulster, seeing a well-armed and independent Presbyterian army as a threat to the status quo, and Parliament continued recruiting English regiments. On 21 December, the Lords approved a Scottish army of 10,000 but the Covenanter government insisted they should also be given control of the three largest ports in Ulster, Carrickfergus, Coleraine and Derry, along with land grants. These demands were rejected by the Commons, leading to further delay and allowing the rebellion to spread. With the situation deteriorating, in February 1642 the two sides put aside their differences and agreed to send 2,500 Scots to Ulster.

Parliament now adopted two measures intended to manage concerns over control of the forces needed for Ireland and how to raise funds for it as quickly as possible, both of which had significant consequences. On 15 March, the Militia Ordinance brought the military and county militia under the control of Parliament, rather than the king. When Charles refused to give it his royal assent, Parliament declared the legislation in force regardless, marking a major step on the road to civil war. On 19 March, the Adventurers' Act invited members of the public to provide loans which would be repaid with land confiscated from the rebels. This need to ensure these were repaid and maintain government credit was one of the factors behind the Cromwellian conquest of Ireland in 1649.

In the first few months of 1642, Ormond regained much of the Pale, relieved Drogheda, re-took Dundalk and defeated a rebel force at Kilrush on 15 April. On the same day, the Covenanter army led by Robert Monro landed at Carrickfergus and recaptured Newry on 1 May. By mid-1642, Protestant forces in Ireland totalled 40,000 infantry and 3,600 horse, but the outbreak of the First English Civil War in August 1642 ended the flow of reinforcements and money from England and a military stalemate ensued.

=== Founding of the Confederation ===
The Great Seal of the Irish Catholic Confederation, with the motto "Irishmen united for God, king and country"

By early 1642, there were four main concentrations of rebel forces; in Ulster under Felim O'Neill, in the Pale around Dublin led by Viscount Gormanston, in the south-east, led by the Butler family – in particular Lord Mountgarret, and in the south-west, led by Donagh MacCarthy, Viscount Muskerry. In areas where British settlers were concentrated, around Cork, Dublin, Carrickfergus and Derry, they raised their own militia in self-defence and managed to hold off the rebel forces.

Within a few months of the rebellion's outbreak, almost all of the Catholic gentry had joined it, including the Anglo-Irish Catholics. There are three main reasons for this. First, local lords and landowners raised armed units of their dependents to control the violence that was engulfing the country, fearing that after the settlers were gone, the Irish peasantry would turn on them as well. Secondly, the Long Parliament made it clear that Irish Catholics who did not demonstrate their loyalty would have their lands confiscated under the Adventurers' Act, agreed on 19 March 1642. Charles was also forbidden by parliament to pardon those accused of rebellion.

Thirdly, it looked initially as if the rebels would be successful after they defeated a government force at Julianstown in November 1641. This perception was soon shattered when the rebels failed to take nearby Drogheda, but by then most of the Catholic gentry had already committed themselves to rebellion. The Catholic gentry around Dublin, known as the "Lords of the Pale", issued their Remonstrance to the king on 17 March 1642 at Trim, County Meath.

Hugh O'Reilly (archbishop of Armagh) held a synod of Irish bishops at Kells, County Meath on 22 March 1642, which legitimised the rebellion as war in defence of the Catholic religion.

On 10 May 1642, Archbishop O'Reilly convened another synod at Kilkenny. Present were 3 archbishops, 11 bishops or their representatives, and other dignitaries. They drafted the Confederate Oath of Association and called on all Catholics in Ireland to take it. Those who took the oath swore allegiance to Charles I and vowed to obey all orders and decrees made by the "Supreme Council of the Confederate Catholics". The rebels henceforth became known as Confederates. The synod re-affirmed that the rebellion was a "just war". It called for the creation of a council (made up of clergy and nobility) for each province, which would be overseen by a national council for the whole island. It vowed to punish misdeeds by Confederate soldiers and to excommunicate any Catholic who fought against the Confederation. The synod sent agents to France, Spain and Italy to gain support, gather funds and weapons, and recruit Irishmen serving in foreign armies.

Lord Mountgarret was appointed president of the Confederate Council, and a General Assembly was held in Kilkenny on 24 October 1642, where it set up a provisional government. Present were 14 Lords Temporal and 11 Lords Spiritual from the Parliament of Ireland, along with 226 commoners. The Assembly elected a Supreme Council of 24, which controlled both military and civilian officers. Its first act was to name the generals who were to command Confederate forces: Owen Roe O'Neill was to command the Ulster forces, Thomas Preston the Leinster forces, Garret Barry the Munster forces and John Burke the Connaught forces. A National Treasury, a mint for making coins, and a press for printing proclamations were set up in Kilkenny.

The Confederation eventually sided with the Royalists in return for the promise of self-government and full rights for Catholics after the war. They were finally defeated by the English Parliament's New Model Army from 1649 through to 1653 and land ownership in Ireland passed largely to Protestant settlers.

== See also ==
- Chronology of the Wars of the Three Kingdoms
- Cromwellian conquest of Ireland
- List of Irish rebellions

== Sources ==
=== Books ===
- Bellings, Richard (1879). Gilbert, JT (ed.). History of the Confederation and War in Ireland in History of the Affairs of Ireland. Irish Archaeological and Celtic society.
- Canny, Nicholas (2001). Making Ireland British 1580–1650. Oxford University Press. ISBN 0-19-925905-4.
- Carpenter, Stanley (2004). Military Leadership in the British Civil Wars. Routledge. ISBN 978-0714655444.
- Carte, Thomas (1736). An History of the Life of James Duke of Ormonde from His Birth 1610 to His Death 1688 Etc, Volume I. J.J Knapton.
- Clarke, Aidan (2009). Moody, TW; Martin, FX; Byrne, FJ (eds.). Plantation and the Catholic Question 1603–1623 in A New History of Ireland, Volume 3: Early Modern Ireland 1534–1691. OUP. ISBN 978-0199562527.
- Corish, Patrick J. (2009). The Rising of 1641 and the Catholic Confederacy 1641–1645 in A New History of Ireland, Volume 3: Early Modern Ireland 1534–1691. OUP. ISBN 978-0199562527.
- Cunningham, John (2021). "Who Framed Charles I? The Forged Commission for the Irish Rebellion of 1641 Revisited". The English Historical Review. 136 (578): 55–84. doi:10.1093/ehr/ceab001.
- Curtis, Edmund (2005). A History of Ireland: From the Earliest Times to 1922. Routledge. ISBN 978-1-134-46666-5.
- Edwards, David; Lenihan, Padraig; Tait, Clodagh, eds. (2007). Age of Atrocity, Violence and Political Conflict in Early Modern Ireland. Four Courts Press. ISBN 978-1-85182-962-0.
- Darcy, Eamon (2013). The Irish Rebellion of 1641 and the Wars of the Three Kingdoms. Boydell & Brewer. ISBN 978-0861933204.
- Jackson, Clare (2021). Devil Land: England under siege, 1588–1688. Allen Lane. ISBN 978-0241285817.
- Jones, Inga (2012). Ryan, Lyndall; Dwyer, Phillip G (eds.). A Sea of Blood? Massacres in Ireland during the Wars of the Three Kingdoms in Theatres of Violence: Massacre, Mass Killing and Atrocity Throughout History. Berghahn Books. ISBN 978-0857453006.
- Kennedy, Liam; Ollerenshaw, Philip (2012). Ulster Since 1600: Politics, Economy, and Society. Oxford University Press. ISBN 978-0199583119.
- Kenyon, John; Ohlmeyer, Jane (1998). The Civil Wars: A Military history of England, Scotland, and Ireland 1638–1660. Oxford University Press. ISBN 978-0198662228.
- Lenihan, Pádraig (2001). Confederate Catholics at War, 1641–49. Cork University Press. ISBN 1-85918-244-5.
- Lenihan, Pádraig (2003). 1690, Battle of the Boyne. Tempus. ISBN 0-7524-2597-8.
- Lenihan, Pádraig (2016). Consolidating Conquest: Ireland 1603–1727. Routledge. ISBN 978-1138140639.
- Lennon, Colm (2005). Sixteenth Century Ireland, The Incomplete Conquest. Gill Books. ISBN 978-0717139477.
- Mac Cuarta, Brian (1993). Ulster 1641: Aspects of the Rising. Institute of Irish Studies, Queen's University of Belfast. ISBN 978-0853894919.
- Manganiello, Stephen C (2004). The Concise Encyclopedia of the Revolutions and Wars of England, Scotland, and Ireland, 1639–1660. Scarecrow Press. ISBN 978-0810851009.
- Marshal, John (2006). John Locke, Toleration and Early Enlightenment Culture. Cambridge University Press. ISBN 0-521-65114-X.
- Meehan, Charles Patrick (1846). The Confederation of Kilkenny. James Duffy.
- Noonan, Kathleen (2004). "Martyrs in Flames: Sir John Temple and the conception of the Irish in English martyrologies". Albion. 36 (2): 223–255. doi:10.2307/4054214. JSTOR 4054214.
- O'Siochru, Michael (1999). Confederate Ireland 1642–49. Four Courts Press.
- Ohlmeyer, Jane (2002). Ireland from Independence to Occupation, 1641–1660. Cambridge University Press. ISBN 978-0521434799.
- Perceval-Maxwell, Michael (1994). The Outbreak of the Irish Rebellion of 1641. McGill-Queen's Press. ISBN 978-0773511576.
- Robinson, Philip (2000). The Plantation of Ulster. Ulster Historical Foundation. ISBN 978-1-903688-00-7.
- Royle, Trevor (2004). Civil War: The Wars of the Three Kingdoms 1638–1660. Abacus. ISBN 978-0-349-11564-1.
- Ryder, Ian (1987). An English Army for Ireland. Partizan Press. ISBN 978-0946525294.
- Stevenson, David (1981). Scottish Covenanters and Irish Confederates. Ulster Historical Foundation. ISBN 978-0901905246.
- Wheeler, James (2003). The Irish and British Wars, 1637–1654: Triumph, Tragedy, and Failure. Routledge. ISBN 978-0415221313.

=== Articles ===
- BBC. "The Gunpowder Plotters, 1605". BBC Bitesize. BBC.
- Canny, Nicholas. The Plantation of Ireland: 1641 rebellion BBC. Accessed 12 February 2008
- Gillespie, Raymond. Plantation of Ulster: Long term consequences, BBC. Accessed 13 February 2008).
- McGettigan, Darren (2009). "O'Reilly, Hugh (Aodh Ó Raghallaigh) | Dictionary of Irish Biography". Dictionary of Irish Biography. Royal Irish Academy. doi:10.3318/dib.006989.v1.
- Noonan, Kathleen M. "Martyrs in Flames": Sir John Temple and the conception of the Irish in English martyrologies. Albion, June 2004.
- O'Dowd, Mary. The Plantation of Ulster: Long term consequences BBC. Accessed 12 February 2008.
- Staff. Secrets of Lough Kernan BBC, Legacies UK history local to you, website of the BBC. Accessed 4 February 2008

=== Depositions of witnesses ===
- Fully searchable digital edition of the 1641 Depositions at Trinity College Dublin Library
