= Siege of Drogheda (1641) =

Failed Irish rebel siege

Coordinates: 53.714°N 6.35°W

- Part of the Irish Rebellion of 1641
Date	21 November 1641 – March 1642
Location	Drogheda, Ireland
Result	Crown victory

Belligerents
Kingdom of Ireland	Irish rebels

Commanders and leaders
Sir Henry Tichborne; Lord Charles Moore	Sir Féilim Ó Néill

Strength
1,660	8,000

Casualties and losses
Unknown	Unknown

Ireland and Drogheda

The siege of Drogheda took place from 21 November 1641 to February 1642 during the Irish Rebellion of 1641. A Catholic force under Féilim Ó Néill laid siege to the town but failed to wrest the garrison from the Royalists. During the siege, the Irish rebels made three attempts to break into and capture the town. All three attempts failed and the town was ultimately relieved by English forces.

== Background ==
After the Irish rebellion began on 22 October 1641, the rebels first attempted to move into Ulster and capture Belfast. When they met stiff resistance from Protestant militias in Ulster, the rebels turned their focus southward with the goal of taking Dublin. En route to attack Dublin, the rebels came upon the town of Drogheda, and laid siege to the Royalist stronghold.

== Assaults during the siege ==
Early in November, Lord Moore of Mellifont had become concerned about the defense of Drogheda and had stepped in to make preliminary improvements. Among the actions that he took were to procure four guns and gunpowder from a merchant ship on the nearby River Boyne. He transferred the guns to the town and placed them on Mill Mount. Lord Moore then put the people of Drogheda to work reinforcing weak points in the city walls. Through appeal to the Lord Justices in Dublin, he was then able to secure a commission to enroll and equip 120 citizens of Drogheda as a military troop at the expense of the State. Lord Moore's actions and concerns eventually convinced the Lord Justices to appoint Sir Henry Tichborne as the Governor of Drogheda. On 8 November, Sir Tichborne set out for Drogheda taking with him 1,000 reinforcements. After the arrival of the reinforcements, the military complement of the garrison at Drogheda had reached approximately 1,660.

Because the rebel force had no artillery with which to breach the walls of Drogheda, they surrounded the town hoping to starve the Royalists into submission. As the garrison continued to hold out throughout the four month siege, the rebels attempted to attack the walls and break into the city in a conventional manner.

The rebels attempted three assaults on the town. On the first occasion the rebels simply rushed the walls. In the second attempt, a small party of 500 men broke into the town at night through dilapidated sections of the walls, with the aim of opening the gates for a storming party of 700 men outside. However, the initial incursion was repulsed in confused fighting and, in the morning, the garrison opened the gates to rebels outside, only to take them prisoner once they entered the town. In early March 1642 when relief was imminent, the rebels tried a final assault attacking the walls with scaling ladders, but were again repulsed.

== Aftermath ==
Shortly afterwards, English reinforcements arrived from Dublin, under Colonel Moore, who was later created the Earl of Drogheda. The English army broke the siege and drove the Irish forces back to Ulster.

A second, more famous siege of Drogheda took place later during the war in 1649, when Oliver Cromwell's New Model Army took the town and massacred its Royalist and Irish Confederate garrison. See Siege of Drogheda.

== Sources ==
- Hamilton, Lord Ernest (1920). The Irish Rebellion of 1641: With a History of the Events which Led Up to and Succeeded it. J. Murray.
- Nicholas, Bernard (1736) [25 May 1642], The whole proceedings of the siege of Drogheda: To which is added, A true account of the siege of London-Derry, S. Hyde
- Plant, David (27 September 2007). "The Confederate War: Campaigns of 1641-2". BCW Project. David Plant.
- Quaile, Declan. "Possible Massacre at Termonfeckin 1642". Termonfeckin Historical Society.
