= Proclamation of Dungannon =

1641 manifesto by Sir Phelim O'Neill, a leader of the Irish Rebellion

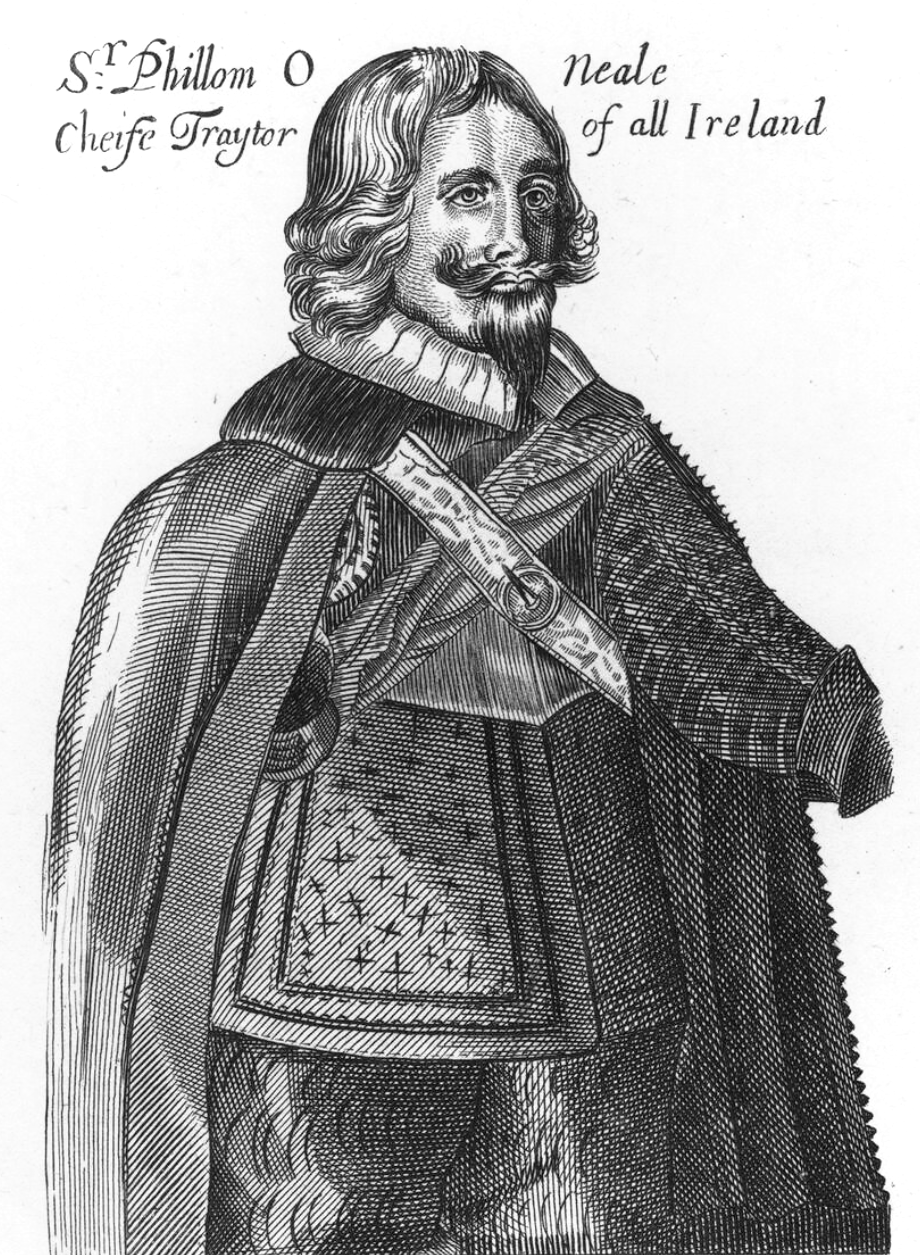
Sir Phelim O'Neill

The Proclamation of Dungannon was a document produced by Sir Phelim O'Neill on 24 October 1641 in the Irish town of Dungannon. O'Neill was one of the leaders of the Irish Rebellion, which had been launched the previous day. O'Neill's Proclamation set out a justification of the uprising. He claimed to have been given a commission signed and sealed on 1 October by the King of Ireland Charles I that commanded him to lead Irish Catholics in defence of the Kingdom of Ireland against Protestants who sympathised with Charles's opponents in the Parliament of England.

== Background ==
Following the trial and execution of the Viceroy, the Earl of Strafford, in May 1641, Ireland was in a state of turmoil. There was growing tension between Catholics and Protestants (particularly those of a Puritan tendency) with the former generally sympathetic to King Charles while the latter supported the English Parliament and the Scottish Covenanters in the dispute that would shortly lead to the outbreak of the English Civil War. This formed part of the wider War of the Three Kingdoms.

On 23 October a major uprising broke out in Ulster organised by leading members of the Gaelic aristocracy. The rebels attacked Protestant plantation settlements as well as native Irish Protestants and took garrison towns held by the Irish Army. Irish government authorities in Dublin struggled to contain the insurgency with the limited number of troops they had at their disposal. A last-minute warning saved Dublin Castle from a surprise attack, although O'Neill was clearly unaware of the failure of the Dublin plot when he issued his proclamation.

== Proclamation ==
After seizing several key strategic points in Ulster over the previous twenty-four hours, Sir Phelim made his proclamation in Dungannon, a town that had symbolic importance as the traditional capital of the O'Neill dynasty. The text read:

This proclamation is to inform all in this country that the present meeting and assembly of the Irish is in no way intended against the King, or to hurt any of his subjects either of the English or the Scottish nation; but only for the defence and liberty of ourselves and of the natives of the Irish nation. We order all people at once to return to their homes, under pain of death, and promise that any hurt done to any person or persons shall be at once repaired."TCD source in modern English; as seen 24 Nov 2016" (PDF). Archived from the original (PDF) on 29 October 2017.

In support of his actions, Sir Phelim claimed to have a document from King Charles commissioning him. The Commission was supposedly signed under the Great Seal of Scotland. By declaring their loyalty to the Crown and defence of the Catholic religion, O'Neill and his followers adopted a political stance which was taken up by the subsequent Irish Confederation which governed rebel-controlled territory in the name of the King from 1642 until 1649. The Proclamation encouraged many Catholics to believe they could lawfully join the rising with the King's blessing, while Protestants were left demoralised.

== Second Proclamation and Commission texts ==
Sir Phelim's second and more trenchant proclamation was made "from our camp at Newry" on 4 November 1641 alongside Rory Maguire:

To all Catholics of the Roman party both English and Irish in the kingdom of Ireland we wish all happiness, freedom of conscience, and victory over the English heretics, who for a long time have tyrannised over our bodies and usurped by extortion our estates. Be it hereby made known unto you, all our friends and countrymen, that the king's most excellent majesty, for many great and urgent causes him thereunto moving, imposing trust and confidence in our fidelity, hath signified unto us, by his commission under the great seal of Scotland, bearing date at Edinburgh, the 1st day of this inst. October, 1641, and also by letters under his sign manual, bearing date with the said commission, of divers great and heinous affronts, that the English Protestants, especially the English Parliament, have published against his royal prerogative, and also against his Catholic friends, within the kingdom of England, the copy of which commission we herewith send unto you, to be published with all speed in all parts of this kingdom, that you may be assured of our sufficient warrant and authority therein.

He also published the actual royal commission that gave authority for his earlier proclamation. It was subtly different, in that it empowered him to arrest and seize property from all of Charles's English Protestant subjects living in Ireland, but exempted his Irish and Scottish subjects. He was ordered to:

Charles, by the Grace of God, King of England, Scotland, France and Ireland, Defender of the Faith, &c., to all Catholic subjects within the kingdom of Ireland, Greeting: Know ye, that We, for the safeguard and preservation of Our person, have been enforced to make our abode and residence in the kingdom of Scotland for a long season, occasioned by reason of the obstinate and disobedient carriage of the Parliament of England against Us that hath not only presumed to take upon them the government and disposition of those princely rights and prerogatives, that have justly descended upon Us from Our predecessors, being kings and queens of the said kingdom for many hundred years past, but also have possessed themselves of the whole strength of the said kingdom, in appointing governors commanders and officers in all places therein, at their own will and pleasure, without Our consent, whereby We are deprived of Our sovereignty and are left naked without defence. And forasmuch as We are in Ourself very sensible, that these storms blow aloft and are very likely to be carried by the vehemency of the Protestant party of the kingdom of Ireland, and endanger Our Regal power and authority there also; Know Ye, that We, reposing much care and trust in your duty and obedience, which We have for many years past found, do hereby give unto you full power and authority to assemble and meet together with all the speed and diligence, that business of so great a consequence doth require, and to advise and consult together by sufficient and discreet numbers at all times, days, and places, which you shall in your judgment hold most convenient, and most for the ordering, settling and effecting the great work (mentioned and directed unto you in Our letters) and to use all politic means and ways possible to possess yourselves (for our use and safety) of all the forts, castles, and places, of strength and defence within the kingdom, (except the places, persons, and estates of Our loyal and loving subjects the Scots) also to arrest and seize the goods, estates, and persons of all the English Protestants, within the said kingdom to Our use. And in your care and speedy performance of this Our will and pleasure We shall rely on your wonted duty and allegiance to Us which We shall accept and reward in due time. Witness Ourself at Edinburgh this 1st day of October in the seventeenth year of Our reign.

Part of the commission in the original spelling:

".. vse all polliticke waies and meanes possible to possess your selues (for our vse and safety) of all the forts Castles and places of strength and defence within the said Kingedome, (except the places, persons and estates of our Loyall and loveinge subiects the Scotts) and allsoe to arrest and seize the goods, estates, and persons of all the English protestants within the said kingdome to our vse."

== Forgery? ==
Until the late nineteenth century historians generally accepted that the commission was genuine, or at the very least Charles had secretly encouraged the Irish Catholics to launch a rising. Since then, for a variety of reasons, it has been considered to be a forgery produced by O'Neill and his associates without the knowledge of the King. They may well have acquired a copy of the Great Seal of Scotland when they captured the garrison town of Charlemont on 23 October.

The historian David Stevenson notes that it would be unlikely that the commission would have been addressed to Sir Phelim O'Neill. Had it been genuine it would almost certainly have been issued to more senior Irish Royalists such as the Earl of Ormond or the leading Catholic noble of Ulster, the Earl of Antrim. It is also unlikely to have been issued at Edinburgh as Sir Phelim claimed. However, King Charles was in Edinburgh on 1 October, dealing with Scottish political matters.

Forgery or not, King Charles publicly proclaimed all the Irish rebels as traitors on 1 January 1642.

== Impact in England and Scotland ==
That the Commission was genuine was widely accepted in England and Scotland by the King's opponents and even some of his own supporters. It seemed to tie in with earlier rumours of an army plot which had suggested that Charles might bring over the New Irish Army, made up largely of Ulster Catholics, to impose his will on England and Scotland. Anger at the King's alleged links with the insurgents grew – particularly as horror stories of atrocities committed, such as the Portadown Massacre, began to filter across the Irish Sea. Tensions arising from news of the Irish rebellion was a factor in the English push to Civil War in early 1642.

The Scottish authorities dispatched an Army which quickly retook much of Ulster from the insurgents. Once the English Civil War broke out in October 1642, Charles' emissaries began negotiations with the Irish rebels for their support, which seemed to present further evidence to his opponents of his links with the Catholic Ulster leaders. Many of these later dealings were exposed when Charles private letters were captured during the Battle of Naseby (1645) and published as The King's Cabinet Opened.

When Phelim O'Neill was captured in 1653 following the Cromwellian conquest of Ireland, he was put on trial for his life. The authorities offered to spare him if he would repeat his earlier claims that Charles had ordered the Catholics to rise in 1641. O'Neill now refused to implicate the King, who had been executed four years earlier, and was put to death himself. Nonetheless the English Republicans continued to use O'Neill's earlier claims of the King's involvement to justify their decision to commit regicide.

== Bibliography ==
- Boyce, David George (1995) [1st pub. 1982]. Nationalism in Ireland (3rd ed.). New York: Routledge. ISBN 9780415127769.
- Hickson, Mary (1884). Ireland in the Seventeenth Century: Or the Massacres of 1641–2. Vol. 1. London: Longmans, Green, and Co.
- Perceval-Maxwell, Michael (1994). The Outbreak of the Irish Rebellion of 1641. Montreal: McGill-Queen’s University Press. ISBN 9780773564503. – Preview
- O Siochru, Micheal. God's Executioner: Oliver Cromwell and the Conquest of Ireland. Faber and Faber, 2009.
- Stevenson, David (1981). Scottish Covenanters and Irish Confederates. Belfast: Ulster Historical Foundation. ISBN 9781903688465. – Preview
- Wedgwood, Cicely Veronica (1978) [1st pub. 1958]. The King's War 1641–1647. London: Collins. ISBN 0-00-211404-6.
