= Portadown massacre =

Massacre of Protestants during the 1641 Irish Rebellion

- Part of the Irish Rebellion of 1641
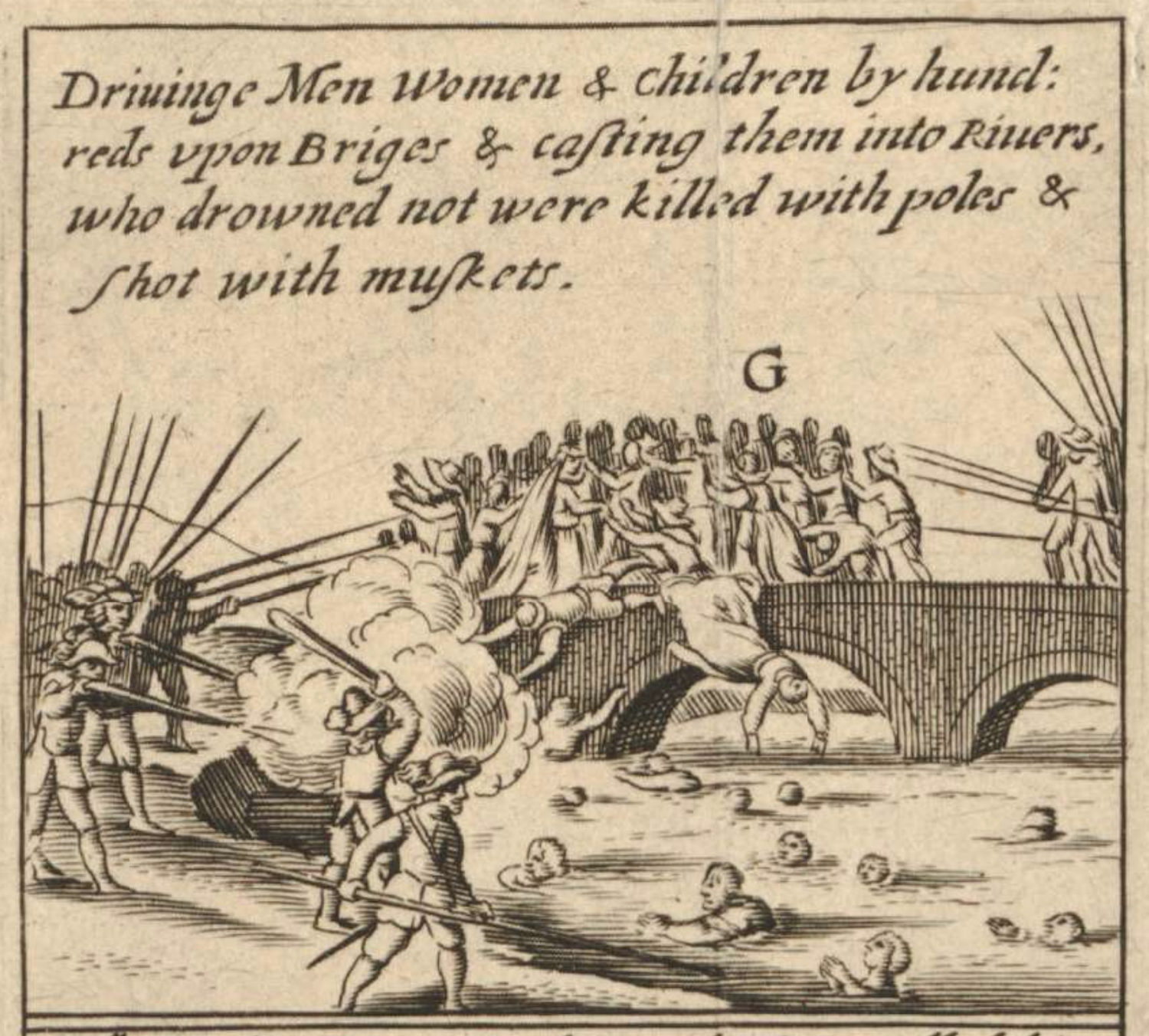
- Engraving of the massacre by Wenceslaus Hollar, published in James Cranford's Teares of Ireland (1642)

- Location: 54°25′16″N 6°27′30″W; Portadown, County Armagh, Ireland
- Date: November 1641
- Attack type: Drowning, shooting
- Deaths: c.100
- Perpetrator: Irish rebels

The Portadown massacre took place in November 1641 at Portadown, County Armagh, during the Irish Rebellion of 1641. Irish Catholic rebels, likely under the command of Toole McCann, killed about 100 Protestant settlers by forcing them off the bridge into the River Bann and shooting those who tried to swim to safety. The settlers were being marched east from a prison camp at Loughgall. This was the biggest massacre of Protestants during the rebellion, and one of the bloodiest during the Irish Confederate Wars. The Portadown massacre, and others like it, terrified Protestants in Ireland and Great Britain, and were used to justify the Cromwellian conquest of Ireland and later to lobby against Catholic rights.

== Background ==
The Irish rebellion had broken out in Ulster on 23 October 1641. It began as an attempted coup d'état by Catholic gentry and military officers, who tried to seize control of the English administration in Ireland. They wanted to force King Charles I to negotiate an end to anti-Catholic discrimination, and greater Irish self-governance, and to partially or fully reverse the plantations of Ireland. Many of those involved in the rebellion had lost their ancestral lands over the past thirty years in the plantation of Ulster.

Most of the land at Portadown had belonged to the McCanns (Mac Cana), a Gaelic clan. As part of the plantation, this land was confiscated by the English Crown and colonized by English and Scottish Protestant settlers. Rebels, including the McCanns, captured Portadown on the first day of the rebellion along with nearby settlements such as Tandragee and Charlemont.

Some of the rebels began attacking and robbing Protestant settlers, although rebel leaders tried to stop this. Irish historian Nicholas Canny suggests that the violence escalated after a failed rebel assault on Lisnagarvey in November 1641, after which the settlers killed several hundred captured rebels. Canny writes, "the bloody mindedness of the settlers in taking revenge when they gained the upper hand in battle seems to have made such a deep impression on the insurgents that, as one deponent put it, 'the slaughter of the English' could be dated from this encounter".

== Massacre ==
Twenty-eight people made statements about the incident, but only one of them witnessed it. The others related what they had heard about it, including possibly from some of the rebels themselves.

William Clarke, the only survivor, stated that he had been held in a prison camp at Loughgall, where many of the prisoners were mistreated and some subjected to half-hangings. The rebels in the Loughgall area were commanded by Manus O'Cane. Clarke states that he and about 100 other prisoners were marched six miles to the bridge over the River Bann at Portadown. The wooden bridge had been broken in the middle. Threatened with swords and pikes, Clarke states the prisoners were stripped, and then forced off the bridge and into the cold river below. Those who tried to swim to safety were shot with muskets. Clarke claimed he was able to escape by bribing the rebels.

The massacre seems to have happened in mid-November. It is likely that the prisoners were being brought to the coast to be deported to Britain, and rebel leader Felim O'Neill had already sent other such convoys safely to Carrickfergus and Newry. Toole McCann was the rebel captain in charge of the Portadown area at the time, and several people made statements that he was responsible for the massacre. Hilary Simms writes: "The convoy entered his area of control and it would seem likely that even if he did not order it, he and his men could not have avoided being involved in it". Native Irish tenants had already been massacred at Castlereagh, but Pádraig Lenihan writes there is no direct evidence the Portadown massacre was retaliation for this.

== Aftermath ==
As word of the massacre spread, "elements of what happened were exaggerated, tweaked and fabricated". People who heard about the massacre gave a range of death tolls, from 68 to 196. As Clarke was a witness of the massacre his figure of 100 is taken as being the most credible. Nevertheless, the Portadown massacre was one of the bloodiest in Ireland during the Irish Confederate Wars. About 4,000 Protestant settlers were killed in Ulster in the early months of the rebellion. In County Armagh, recent research has shown that about 1,250 Protestants were killed, about a quarter of the settler population there. In County Tyrone, modern research has identified three blackspots for the killing of settlers, with the worst being near Kinard, "where most of the British families planted ... were ultimately murdered". Though a supporter of British rule in Ireland, 19th-century historian William Lecky wrote "it is far from clear on which side the balance of cruelty rests".

The massacre terrified Protestant settlers and was used to support the view that the rebellion was a Catholic conspiracy to massacre all Protestants in Ireland, though in truth such massacres were mostly confined to Ulster. In 1642, a commission of inquiry was held into the killings of settlers. Protestant bishop Henry Jones led the inquiry and read out some of the evidence to the English parliament in March 1642. The massacre featured prominently in English Parliamentarian atrocity propaganda in the 1640s, most famously in John Temple's The Irish Rebellion (1646). Temple used the massacres at Portadown and elsewhere to lobby for the military re-conquest of Ireland and the segregation of Irish Catholics from Protestant settlers in Ireland. Accounts of the massacre strengthened the resolve of many Parliamentarians to re-conquer Ireland, which they did in 1649–52. Temple's work was published at least ten times between 1646 and 1812. The graphic massacres depicted therein were used to lobby against granting more rights to Catholics.

After the massacre, stories spread of ghosts appearing in the river at Portadown, screeching and crying out for revenge. These stories were said to have struck fear into the locals. One woman stated that Irish Confederate commander Owen Roe O'Neill went to the site of the massacre when he returned to Ireland in 1642. She stated that a female ghost appeared, crying for revenge. O'Neill sent for a priest to speak to the ghost, but it would only speak to a Protestant cleric from an English regiment.

Toole McCann was later captured by English forces. He was questioned and made a statement in May 1653, saying he had not authorised nor seen the massacre, but had only heard of it. He was executed shortly after.
