= James McCann =

James or Jim McCann may refer to:

== Politics ==
- James McCann (Drogheda MP) (died 1873), Member of Parliament for Drogheda 1852–65
- James McCann (St Stephen's Green MP) (1840–1904), Member of Parliament for Dublin St Stephen's Green 1900–04
- James McCann (Wisconsin politician) (1924–2009), American politician
- James Joseph McCann (1886–1961), Canadian politician

== Others ==
- James McCann (baseball) (born 1990), American baseball player
- James McCann (bishop) (1897–1983), Anglican Bishop of Meath 1945–59, Archbishop of Armagh 1959–69
- James McCann (businessman), American entrepreneur who founded 1-800-Flowers
- James McCann (drugs trafficker) (born 1939), Irish drugs trafficker, known as Jim
- Jim McCann (born 1949), American football player
- Jim McCann (musician) (1944–2015), Irish folk musician and entertainer
- Jim McCann (writer) (born 1974), American comic book writer
- James McCann (born 1991), Australian comedian and poet
