= Presbytery of Carrickfergus =

First Presbyterian governing body established in Ulster, Ireland (1642)

Establishment of the First Presbytery in Ireland
- Part of Irish Confederate Wars
- Date: June 1642
- Location: Carrickfergus, County Antrim, Ireland
- Organised by: Scottish Covenanter army chaplains
- Outcome: Formation of first Presbyterian presbytery in Ulster

The Presbytery of Carrickfergus was the first Presbytery in Ireland. It was established in Carrickfergus, County Antrim, in June 1642 by Scottish army chaplains who had accompanied the Covenanter Army in Ireland during the Irish Confederate Wars.

It was the forerunner of the Synod of Ulster.

== See also ==
- Presbyterian Church in Ireland
- Covenanter Army in Ireland
- Ulster Scots people

== Sources ==
- Chisholm, Hugh, ed. (1911). "Carrickfergus" . Encyclopædia Britannica (11th ed.). Cambridge University Press.
- Witherow, Thomas (1879). Historical and Literary Memorials of Presbyterianism in Ireland (1623–1731). Belfast: C. Aitchison.
