= Michael McCann =

Michael McCann is the name of:

- Michael McCann (composer) (born 1976), film, television, and game composer
- Michael McCann (field hockey) (born 1977), field hockey striker from Australia
- Michael McCann (politician) (born 1964), British MP
- Michael McCann (sports law) (born 1976), professor at University of New Hampshire School of Law; commentator at NBA TV and Sports Illustrated
- Michael J. McCann, Canadian author of crime and supernatural fiction
- E. Michael McCann (born 1936), District Attorney of Milwaukee County in Wisconsin, 1968–2006
- Mickey McCann, Irish hurler
