= McGinn =

McGinn (Mcginn) is an Irish surname it originated in Sligo, and may refer to

- Brock McGinn (born 1994), Canadian ice hockey player
- Colin McGinn (born 1950), British philosopher
- Conor McGinn (born 1984), Irish politician in England, Labour MP for St Helens North from 2015 to 2024
- Dan McGinn (1943–2023), American baseball player
- Jamie McGinn (born 1988), Canadian ice hockey player
- John McGinn (born 1994), Scottish footballer
- Michael McGinn (born 1959), mayor of Seattle (2010–2013)
- Niall McGinn (born 1987), Northern Irish footballer
- Paul McGinn (born 1990), Scottish footballer
- Sandy McGinn, Scottish footballer
- Stephen McGinn (born 1988), Scottish footballer
