= Philip O'Reilly (Cavan County MP) =

- Pilib MacAodh Ó Raghallaigh

High Sheriff of Cavan
- In office 1629–1630
- Preceded by: Stephen Butler
- Succeeded by: Thomas Fleming

Member of Parliament for County Cavan
- In office 1639 – 16 November 1641
- Succeeded by: Francis Hamilton

Lord President of Ulster
- In office 14 November 1642 – 27 April 1653
- Preceded by: Title created
- Succeeded by: Title abolished

Personal details
- Born: 1599 County Cavan, Kingdom of Ireland
- Died: 1655 (aged 55–56) Louvain, Spanish Netherlands
- Spouse: Rose O'Neill
- Children: Hugh Roe O'Reilly (d. 1651)

Military service
- Allegiance: Irish Catholic Confederation (1642–1653); Spanish Empire (1653–1655)
- Branch/service: Irish Regiment
- Rank: Colonel
- Battles/wars: Irish Rebellion of 1641; Irish Confederate Wars; Cromwellian conquest of Ireland

Colonel Philip O'Reilly (Irish: Pilib MacAodh Ó Raghallaigh) (1599–1655) was a member of parliament for County Cavan, Ireland in the Irish Parliament from 1639 to 1641, and a leading member of the 1641 Rebellion.

== Ancestry ==
His Gaelic name was Pilib mac Aoidh mic Sheáin mic Aoidh Chonallaigh Ó Raghallaigh and by the English he was named Philip McHugh McShane O'Reilly. His father, grandfather and several other ancestors were chiefs of the O'Reilly clan and Lords of Breifne O'Reilly. His mother was Catherine MacMahon. He resided at Bellanacargy Castle in the barony of Tullygarvey, (near the present-day village of Drung). Bellanacargy castle, anciently referred to as Ballynacarraig because it was built on a carraig (rock island) situated in the middle of the Annalee river, was destroyed in May 1689 by Williamite forces led by Thomas Lloyd.

== Career ==
As a young man he served for some time in the Spanish army but returned to Ireland. He was appointed Commissioner of the Peace in 1625 and High Sheriff of Cavan in 1629. He was elected as MP for County Cavan in 1639.

During the Parliamentary session of 1640 he was enlisted by Rory (Roger) O'Moore in the plot to start a rebellion against English rule in Ireland. O'Moore was a distant relation as his sister Cecilia O'Moore was married to O'Reilly's first cousin, Tirlagh O'Neill. On the outbreak of the Irish Rebellion in October 1641 he was elected chief of the O'Reillys. As a result, the Irish Parliament expelled him on 16 November 1641. On 6 November 1641 he ordered a general gathering of his clansmen from 16 to 60 years of age, to be held at Virginia, and on 11 December 1641 he had possession of the whole county, except the Killeshandra castles of Keelagh and Croghan which were defended by Sir Francis Hamilton and Sir James Craig. He raised a brigade of twelve hundred men, composed chiefly of his name and family, and served with distinction as lieutenant-general in the service of the Confederate Catholics of Ireland. The Assembly of Kilkenny appointed him Lord President of Ulster. His second cousin Myles O'Reilly was High Sheriff of Cavan in 1641 at the outbreak of the Rebellion.

Philip O'Reilly was attainted for treason by the English government in 1642. In his diary for 3 June 1644, Sir James Ware (historian) states "Intelligence came to Dublin that Roger Moore and Philip O'Reilly, two of the first incendiaries were committed to prison at Kilkenny". O'Reilly was further denounced by Cromwell's Act of 1652 at the end of the rebellion. Following the collapse of the Irish confederacy, he formally surrendered to Cromwell at Cloughoughter Castle on 27 April 1653, being the last Irish garrison to do so. He secured favourable terms but was obliged to leave Ireland. He retired with his brigade into Spain and thence to the Netherlands, where he served in the Spanish army for about two years and died in 1655. He was buried in the Irish monastery of St. Dominick in the city of Louvain, Belgium.

== Family ==
Philip O'Reilly married Rose O'Neill, the sister of Owen Roe O'Neill, the military leader of the Irish in Ulster during the Confederate Wars of the 1640s. His children by her were 1. Aodh Ruadh, his only legitimate son, who was killed by the Cromwellians; 2. Eibhlin, who married Colla Dubh Mac Mahon, and whose son was Most Reverend Hugh MacMahon, Roman Catholic Archbishop of Armagh; 3. Maire, who married firstly Aodh Maguire and secondly Ruaidhri Og Maguire, the 5th Lord Enniskillen.

Phillip also had an illegitimate son, Sean O'Reilly.

Poem XXVIII in James Carney's 'Poems on the O'Reillys' is dedicated to Philip O'Reilly. John Colgan, the eminent Donegal hagiographer, dedicated his treatise on Duns Scotus, published at Antwerp in 1655, to Philip O'Reilly.
