= Kevin McCann =

Kevin McCann is the name of:

== Sport ==
- Kevin McCann (footballer, born 1953), Scottish footballer
- Kevin McCann (footballer, born 1980), Scottish footballer
- Kevin McCann (footballer, born 1987), Scottish footballer

== Other people ==
- Kevin McCann (filmmaker), producer of upcoming film The Rising: 1916
- Kevin C. McCann, American author and academic
