= Niamh McCann =

Niamh McCann may refer to:

- Niamh McCann (born 1971), Irish sculptor and visual artist
- Niamh McCann (Irish actress)
