= Jim McCann =

American football player (born 1949)

No. 15, 8, 5
- Position: Punter

Personal information
- Born: March 29, 1949 (age 77); Phoenix, Arizona, U.S.
- Listed height: 6 ft 2 in (1.88 m)
- Listed weight: 163 lb (74 kg)

Career information
- High school: North (Phoenix)
- College: Arizona State
- NFL draft: 1971: 8th round, 205th overall pick

Career history
- San Francisco 49ers (1971–1972); New York Giants (1973); Kansas City Chiefs (1975)
- Stats at Pro Football Reference

James William McCann (born March 29, 1949) is an American former professional football player who was a punter for the San Francisco 49ers, New York Giants and Kansas City Chiefs of the National Football League (NFL). He played college football for the Arizona State Sun Devils. He played two seasons for the 49ers after they selected him 205th overall in the eighth round of the 1971 NFL draft. After San Francisco released him on September 5, 1973, he joined the New York Giants in October, replacing Tom Blanchard. McCann played two games for the Giants, averaging 24.5 yards per punt with three blocked punts, before he was waived and replaced by Blanchard. McCann did not play football in 1974, when he instead spent a semester at Arizona State University and sold insurance in San Francisco. He played three games for the Kansas City Chiefs in 1975, replacing an injured Jerrel Wilson.
