= Confederate Ireland =

Period of Irish Catholic self-government (1642–49)

Coordinates: 52°39′N 7°15′W

Irish Catholic Confederation Comhdháil Chaitliceach na hÉireann
- 1642–1652
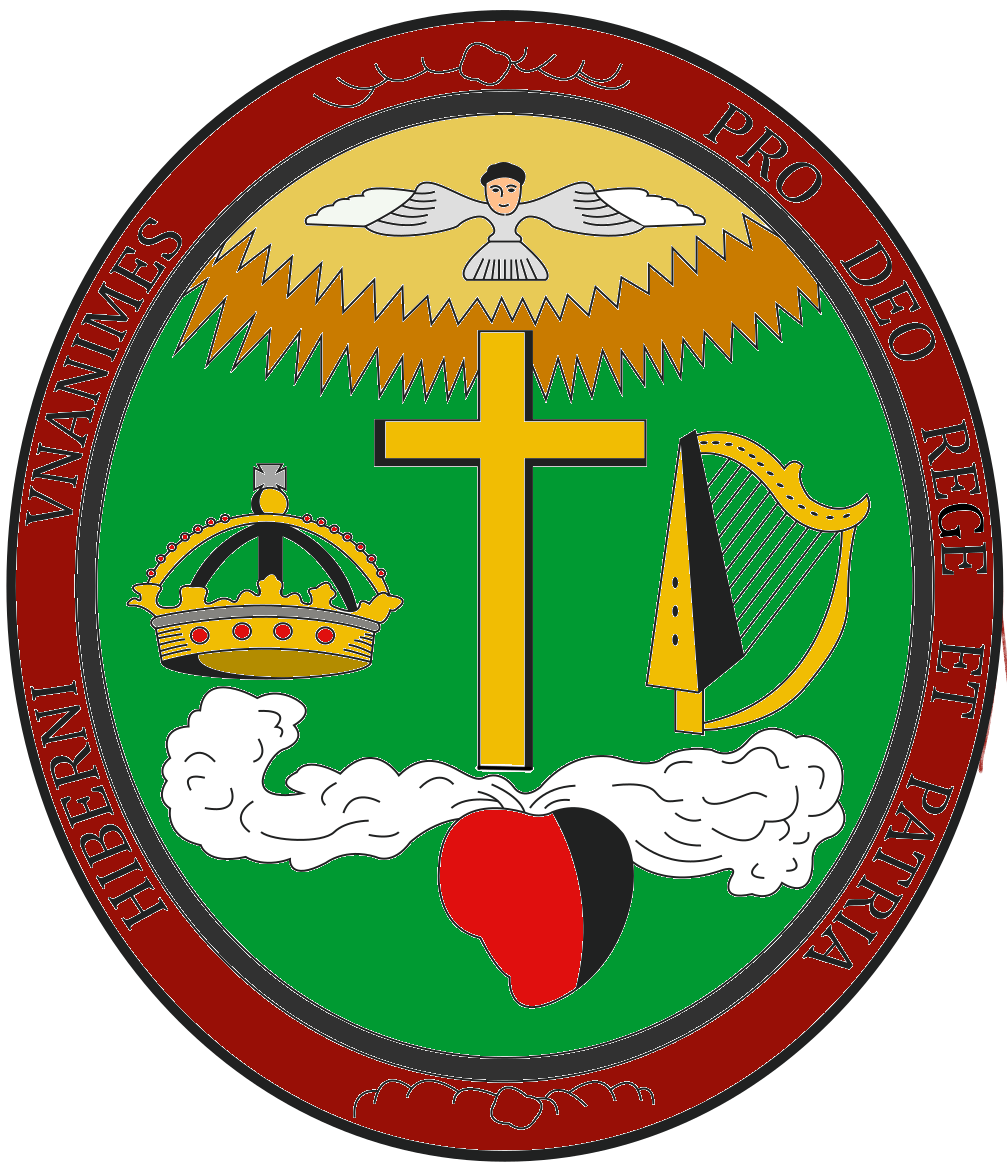
- Flag Great Seal
- Motto: Hiberni unanimes pro Deo Rege et Patria (Latin); Éireannaigh aontaithe le Dia, rí agus tír (Irish) "Irishmen united for God, king and country"
- Capital: Kilkenny
- Common languages: Irish, English
- Religion: Roman Catholic
- Government: Confederal constitutional monarchy
- King
  - 1641–1649: Charles I
  - 1649–1653: Charles II
- Legislature: General Assembly
- Historical era: Irish Confederate Wars
  - Irish Rebellion of 1641: 1641
  - Established: 1642
  - Cromwellian conquest: 1652
Preceded by	Succeeded by
Kingdom of Ireland	Commonwealth of England

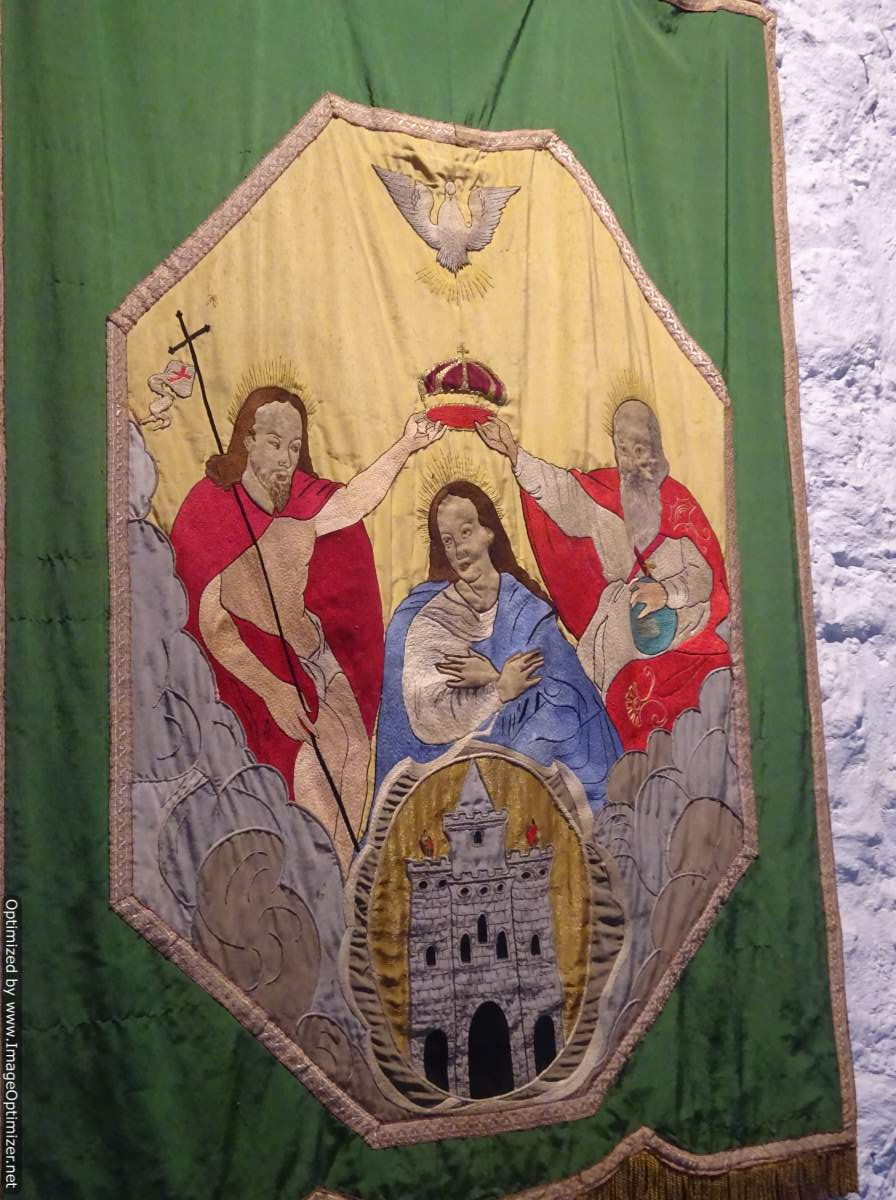
Replica of a Confederation flag found in Rothe House, Kilkenny; it depicts the Coronation of Mary as Queen of Heaven by the Holy Trinity; an explicitly Catholic symbol.

Confederate Ireland, also referred to as the Irish Catholic Confederation, was a period of Irish Catholic self-government between 1642 and 1652, during the Eleven Years' War. Formed by Catholic aristocrats, landed gentry, clergy and military leaders after the Irish Rebellion of 1641, the Confederates controlled up to two-thirds of Ireland from their base in Kilkenny; hence it is sometimes called the Confederation of Kilkenny.

The Confederates included Catholics of Gaelic and Anglo-Norman descent. They wanted an end to anti-Catholic discrimination within the Kingdom of Ireland and greater Irish self-governance; many also wanted to roll back the plantations of Ireland. Most Confederates professed loyalty to Charles I of England in the belief they could reach a lasting settlement in return for helping defeat his opponents in the Wars of the Three Kingdoms. Its institutions included a legislative body known as the General Assembly, an executive or Supreme Council, and a military. It minted coins, levied taxes and set up a printing press. Confederate ambassadors were appointed and recognised in France, Spain and the Papal States, who supplied them with money and weapons.

At various times, Confederate armies fought Royalists, Parliamentarians, Ulster Protestant militia and Scots Covenanters; these controlled the Pale, parts of eastern and northern Ulster, and the region around Cork. Charles authorised secret negotiations which in September 1643 resulted in a Confederate–Royalist ceasefire and led to further talks, most of which proved unsuccessful. In 1644, a Confederate military expedition landed in Scotland to help Royalists there. The Confederates continued to fight the Parliamentarians in Ireland, and decisively defeated the Covenanter army in the Battle of Benburb.

In 1647, the Confederates suffered a string of defeats at Dungan's Hill, Cashel and Knocknanuss. This prompted them to make an agreement with the Royalists, leading to internal divisions which hampered their ability to resist a Parliamentarian invasion. In August 1649, a large English Parliamentarian army, led by Oliver Cromwell, invaded Ireland. By May 1652 it had defeated the Confederate–Royalist alliance, although Confederate soldiers continued a guerrilla warfare campaign for a further year.

== Formation ==
The Irish Catholic Confederation was formed in the aftermath of the 1641 rebellion, both to control the popular uprising and to organise an Irish Catholic war effort against the remaining English and Scottish armies in Ireland. It was hoped that by doing this, the Irish Catholics could hold off an English or Scottish re-conquest of the country.

The initiative for the Confederation came from a Catholic bishop, Nicholas French, and a lawyer named Nicholas Plunkett. They put forth their proposals for a government to Irish Catholic nobles such as Viscount Gormanston, Viscount Mountgarret, Viscount Muskerry and the Baron of Navan. These men would commit their own armed forces to the Confederation and persuaded other rebels to join it. The declared aims of the Confederates were similar to those of Sir Phelim O'Neill, the leader of the early stages of the rebellion in Ulster, who issued the Proclamation of Dungannon in October 1641.

On 17 March 1642, these nobles signed the "Catholic Remonstrance" issued at Trim, County Meath that was addressed to King Charles I. On 22 March, at a synod in nearby Kells chaired by Hugh O'Reilly, Archbishop of Armagh, a majority of the Catholic bishops proclaimed that the rebellion was a just war.

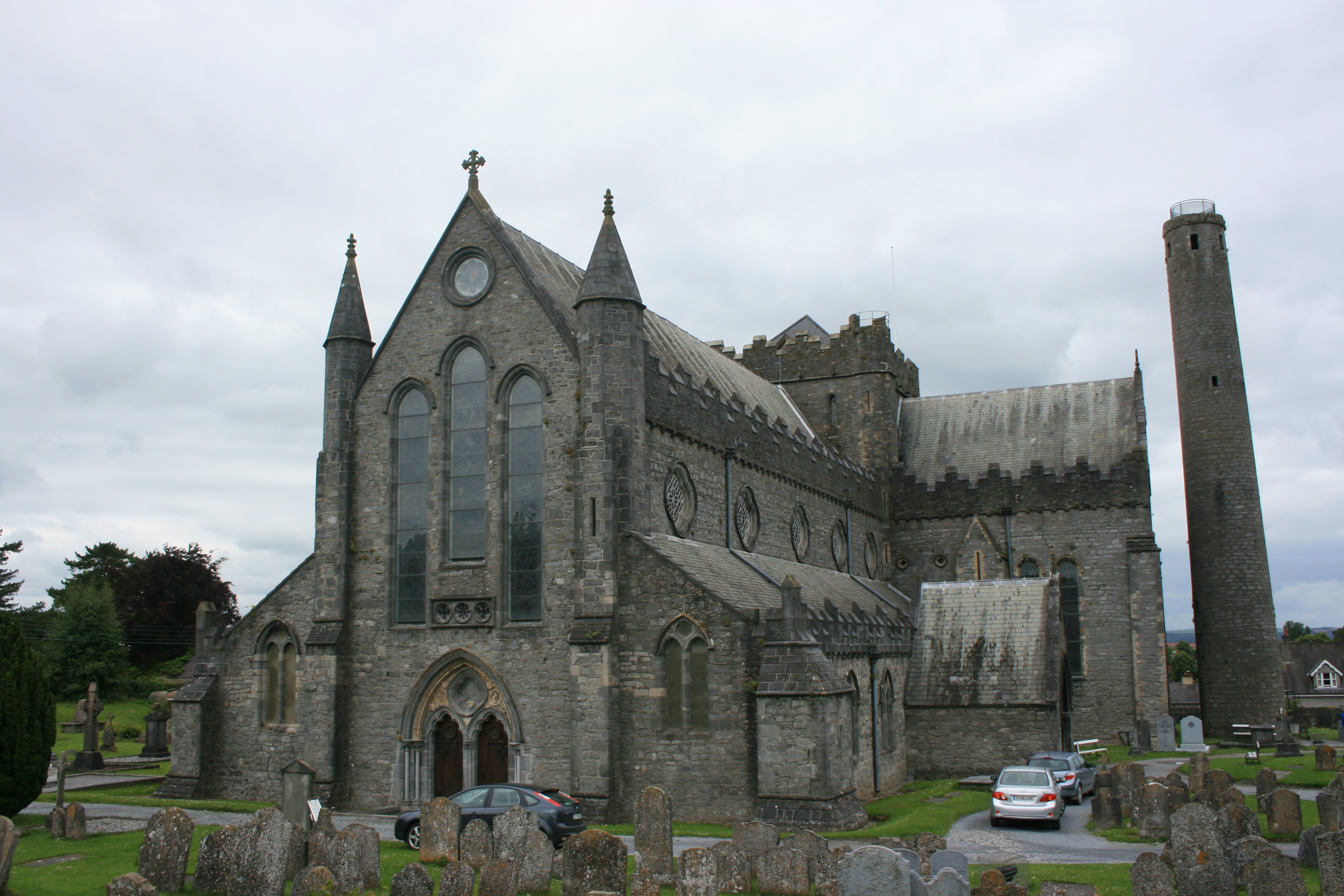
Cathedral of St Canice, where members of the Assembly heard mass.

On 10 May 1642, Ireland's Catholic clergy held a synod at Kilkenny. Present were the Archbishops of Armagh, Cashel and Tuam, eleven bishops or their representatives, and other dignitaries. They drafted the Confederate Oath of Association and called on all Catholics in Ireland to take the oath. Those who took the oath swore allegiance to Charles I and vowed to obey all orders and decrees made by the "Supreme Council of the Confederate Catholics". The rebels henceforth became known as Confederates. The synod re-affirmed that the rebellion was a "just war". It called for the creation of a council (made up of clergy and nobility) for each province, which would be overseen by a national council for the whole island. It vowed to punish misdeeds by Confederate soldiers and to excommunicate any Catholic who fought against the Confederation. The synod sent agents to France, Spain and Italy to gain support, gather funds and weapons, and recruit Irishmen serving in foreign armies. Lord Mountgarret was appointed president of the Confederate Supreme Council, and a General Assembly was fixed for October that year.

=== The first Confederate Assembly ===
The first Confederate General Assembly was held in Kilkenny on 24 October 1642, where it set up a provisional government. The Assembly was a parliament in all but name. Present at the first Assembly were 14 Lords Temporal and 11 Lords Spiritual from the Parliament of Ireland, along with 226 commoners. The Confederate's constitution was written by a Galway lawyer named Patrick D'Arcy. The Assembly resolved that each county should have a council, overseen by a provincial council made up of two representatives from each county council. The Assembly agreed orders "to be observed as the model of their government".

The Assembly elected an executive known as the Supreme Council. The first Supreme Council was elected on or about 14 November. It consisted of 24 members, 12 of whom were to abide always in Kilkenny or wherever else they deemed fitting.

The members of the first Supreme Council were as follows:

Leinster	Ulster	Connacht	Munster
Thomas Fleming, Archbishop of Dublin	Hugh O'Reilly, Archbishop of Armagh	Malachias O'Queely, Archbishop of Tuam	Maurice Roche, 8th Viscount Fermoy
Viscount Gormanston	Heber MacMahon, Bishop of Down	Miles Bourke, 2nd Viscount Mayo	Daniel O'Brien, 1st Viscount Clare
Viscount Mountgarret	Philip O'Reilly	John de Burgh, Bishop of Clonfert	Edmund FitzMaurice
Nicholas Plunkett	Col. Brian MacMahon	Sir Lucas Dillon	Dr Fennel
Richard Bellings	Heber Magennis	Geoffrey Browne	Robert Lambert
James Cusack	Turlogh O'Neill	Patrick D'Arcy	George Comyn

James Tuchet, 3rd Earl of Castlehaven, representing the Crown, was the final member of the Supreme Council.

The Supreme Council would have power over all military generals, military officers and civil magistrates. Its first act was to name the generals who were to command Confederate forces: Owen Roe O'Neill was to command the Ulster forces, Thomas Preston the Leinster forces, Garret Barry the Munster forces and John Burke the Connacht forces. Ulick Burke, 1st Marquess of Clanricarde was named head general, as they thought he would sooner or later join the Confederates. The Supreme Council issued an order to raise £30,000 and a levy of 31,700 men in Leinster who were to be trained at once.

The Supreme Council also made its own seal, described as follows: "'Twas circular, and in its centre was a large cross, the base of which rested on a flaming heart, while its apex was overlapped by the wings of a dove. On the left of the cross was the harp, and on the right the crown." The motto on the seal was Pro Deo, Rege, et Patria, Hiberni Unanimes (For God, King and Fatherland, Ireland is United).

A National Treasury, a mint for making coins, and a press for printing proclamations were set up in Kilkenny. This first General Assembly sat until 9 January 1643.

=== Policies ===
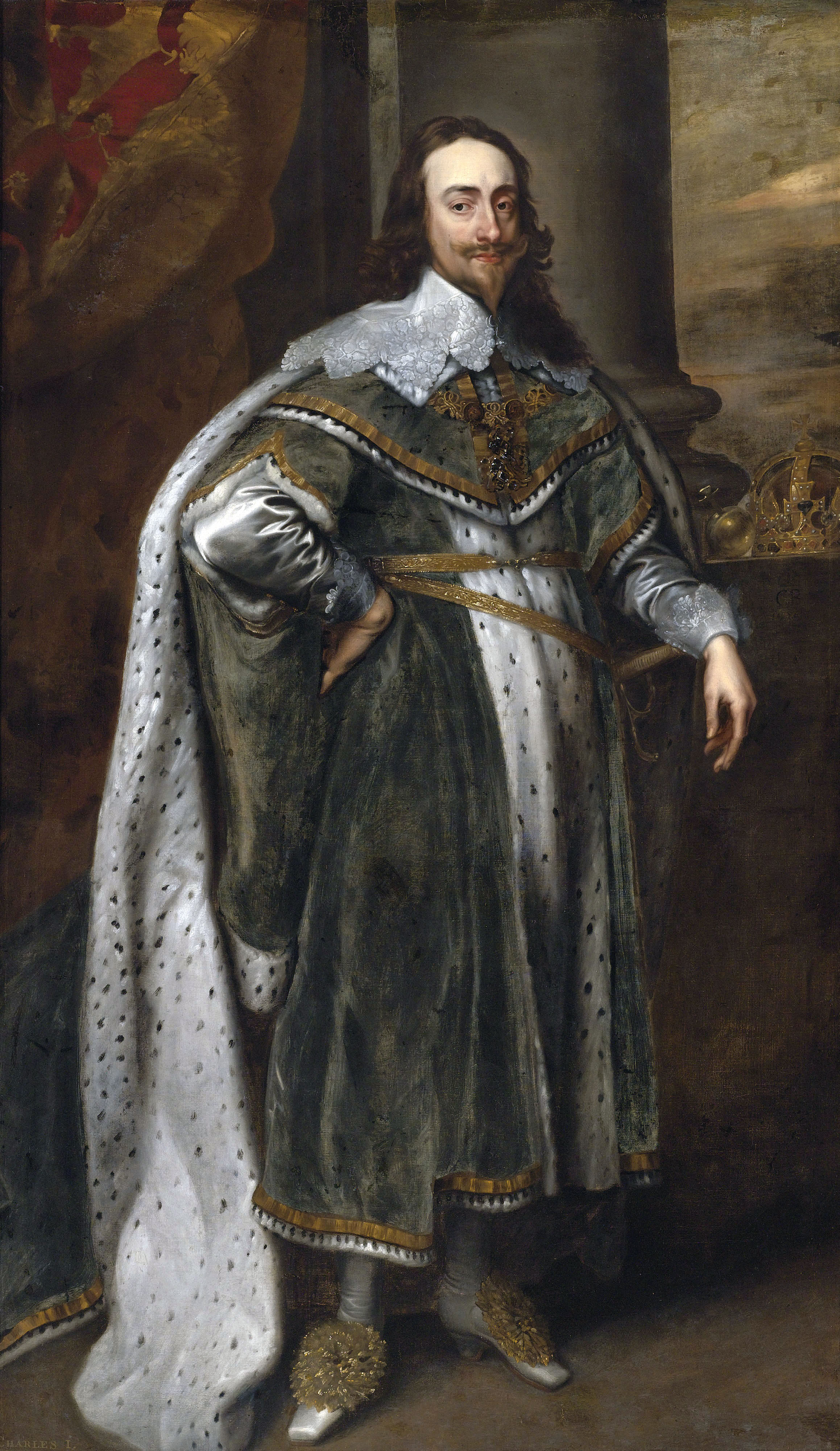
Charles I; the Confederates pledged him allegiance, but the two sides struggled to agree terms

The last piece of legislation agreed by Charles I and Parliament was the 1642 Adventurers' Act, which provided funds to suppress the 1641 Rebellion by confiscating "rebel" lands. In order to keep their estates, in the context of the Wars of the Three Kingdoms the Confederates claimed to be Royalists loyal to the king, which made reaching an agreement with him a matter of primary importance. As a result, the Confederacy never claimed to be an independent government and since only Charles could legally call Parliament, their General Assembly never claimed to be one, although this did not prevent it enacting legislation.

Confederate political demands included Irish self-government, secure tenure of their lands, amnesty for any acts committed during the Rebellion, an equal share in government positions and that these concessions be ratified by a post-war Parliament. In terms of religion, they insisted on toleration of Catholicism and in June 1645 added the stipulation that the Catholic clergy should retain all properties taken from the Church of Ireland since 1641. In reality, these were almost impossible to achieve, since they were asking Charles to make concessions he had refused to make to Parliament, while the vast majority of his advisors opposed them on the grounds that doing so would fatally undermine the Royalist cause in England and Scotland.

The Confederate position was further weakened by divisions between the Old English, mostly descendants of those who arrived during the Anglo-Norman invasion of Ireland in 1172, and the native Gaelic Irish. While many historians dispute the extent of the differences between the two groups, there are significant variations in terms of political, religious and economic objectives. In general, the Old English wanted to regain the power and influence they had lost under the Tudors and although they were sincere Catholics, did not support establishing the church as the state religion. Gaelic Irish leaders such as Owen Roe O'Neill wanted to reverse the Plantations of Ireland, since this was the only way to retrieve their ancestral lands; however, they were far less united in their demands than the Old English and it has been argued they formed a pressure group, rather than a distinct political philosophy.

== The 1643 Cessation ==
Battle flags of the Confederates included the words Vivat Rex Carolus 'Long live King Charles'

In September 1643, the Confederates negotiated a "cessation" with James Butler, 1st Duke of Ormonde, Royalist Governor of Ireland, which was signed at Jigginstown, near Naas. This ended hostilities ceased between the Confederates and Ormonde's royalist army based in Dublin. However, Murrough O'Brien, 1st Earl of Inchiquin, a rare Gaelic Irish Protestant who commanded the Royalist garrison of Cork, objected to the ceasefire and declared his allegiance to Parliament in England. The Scottish Covenanters had also landed an army in Ulster in 1642, which remained hostile to the Confederates and to the king – as did the Laggan Army of the Scottish settlers living in Ulster.

The Jacobite historian Thomas Carte mentioned the financial terms of the Cessation, whereby the Confederates undertook to pay Ormonde £30,000 in stages up to May 1644, half in cash and half in live cattle.

In 1644 the Confederates sent around 1,500 men under Alasdair MacColla to Scotland to support the royalists there under James Graham, 1st Marquess of Montrose against the Covenanters, sparking a Civil War – their only intervention on the Royalist side in the civil wars in Great Britain.

== Papal Nuncio's arrival ==
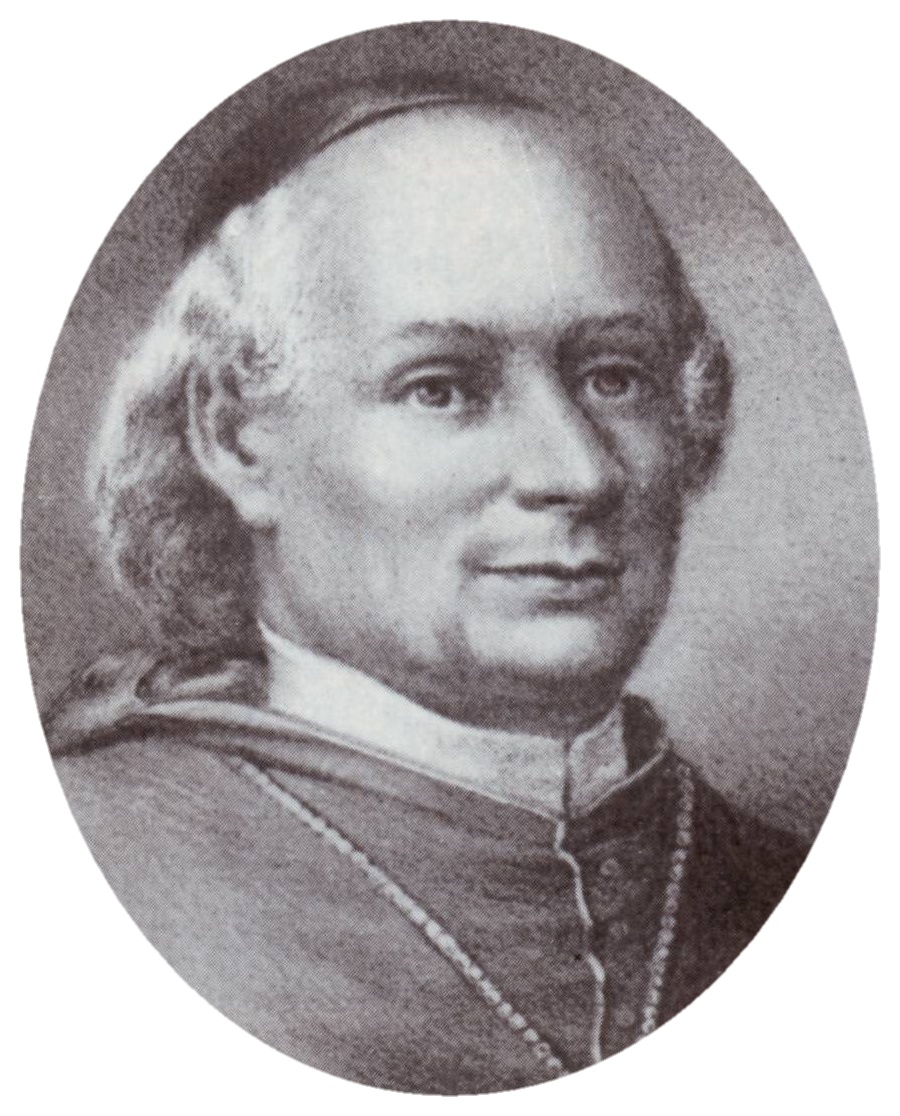
The Papal Nuncio, Giovanni Battista Rinuccini

The Confederates received modest subsidies from the monarchies of France and Spain, who wanted to recruit troops in Ireland but their main continental support came from the Papacy. Pope Urban VIII sent Pierfrancesco Scarampi to liaise with and help the Confederates' Supreme Council in 1643. Pope Innocent X strongly supported Confederate Ireland, over the objections of Cardinal Mazarin and the Queen, Henrietta Maria, who had moved to Paris in 1644. Innocent received the Confederation's envoy in February 1645 and resolved to send a nuncio extraordinary to Ireland, Giovanni Battista Rinuccini, archbishop of Fermo, who embarked from La Rochelle with the Confederacy's secretary, Richard Bellings. He took with him a large quantity of arms and military supplies and a very large sum of money. These supplies meant that Rinuccini had a big influence on the Confederates' internal politics and he was backed by the more militant Confederates such as Owen Roe O'Neill. At Kilkenny Rinuccini was received with great honours, asserting that the object of his mission was to sustain the King, but above all to help the Catholic people of Ireland in securing the free and public exercise of the Catholic religion, and the restoration of the churches and church property, but not any former monastic property.

== The first "Ormonde Peace" ==
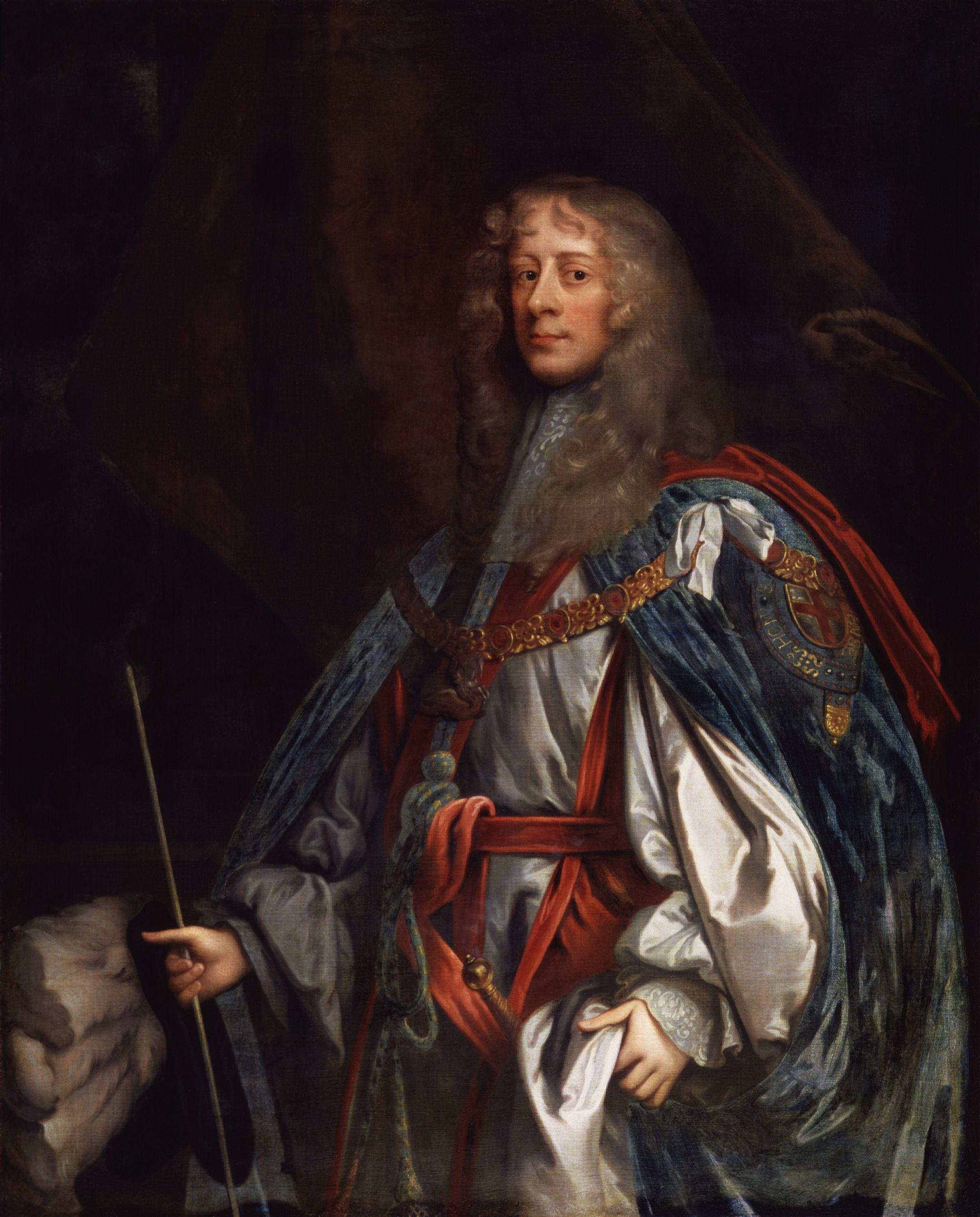
The Duke of Ormonde

The Supreme Council put great hope in a secret treaty they had concluded with Edward Somerset, 2nd Marquess of Worcester, under his new title of Earl of Glamorgan, on the King's behalf, which promised further concessions to Irish Catholics in the future. Being a very wealthy English Catholic royalist, Glamorgan was sent to Ireland in late June 1645 with secret orders from Charles to agree to the Confederates' demands in return for an Irish Catholic army that would fight for the King in England. The plan would be anathema to most English Protestants at the time. A copy of Glamorgan's secret orders was publicised by the Long Parliament in the pamphlet The King's Cabinet Opened, and to preserve his support in Protestant England the King had to deny his link and even proclaimed Glamorgan as a traitor. To deter the use of Confederate Irish soldiers in England the Long Parliament passed the Ordinance of no quarter to the Irish in October 1644.

The nuncio considered himself the virtual head of the Confederate Catholic party in Ireland. In 1646 the Supreme Council of the Confederates had come to an agreement with Ormonde, signed on 28 March 1646. Under its terms Catholics would be allowed to serve in public office and to found schools; there were also verbal promises of future concessions on religious toleration. There was an amnesty for acts committed in the Rebellion of 1641 and a guarantee against further seizure of Irish Catholic rebels' land by acts of attainder.

However, there was no reversal of Poynings' Law, which meant that any legislation due to be presented to the Parliament of Ireland must first be approved by the English Privy Council, no reversal of the Protestant majority in the Irish House of Commons and no reversal of the main plantations, or colonisation, in Ulster and Munster. Moreover, regarding the religious articles of the treaty, all churches taken over by Catholics in the war would have to be returned to Protestant hands and the public practice of Catholicism was not guaranteed.

In return for the concessions that were made Irish troops would be sent to England to fight for the royalists in the English Civil War. However, the terms agreed were not acceptable to either the Catholic clergy, the Irish military commanders – notably Owen Roe O'Neill and Thomas Preston – or the majority of the General Assembly. Nor was the papal nuncio Rinuccini party to the treaty, which left untouched the objects of his mission; he had induced nine of the Irish bishops to sign a protest against any arrangement with Ormonde or the king that would not guarantee the maintenance of the Catholic religion.

Many believed the Supreme Council were unreliable since many of them were related to Ormonde or otherwise bound to him. Besides, it was pointed out that the English Civil War had already been decided in the English Parliament's favour and that sending Irish troops to the royalists would be a futile sacrifice. On the other hand, many felt after O'Neill's Ulster army defeated the Scots at the battle of Benburb in June 1646 that the Confederates were in a position to re-conquer all of Ireland. Furthermore, those who opposed the peace were backed, both spiritually and financially, by Rinuccini, who threatened to excommunicate the "peace party". The Supreme Council were arrested and the General Assembly voted to reject the deal.

== Military defeat and a new Ormonde peace ==
After the Confederates rejected the peace deal, Ormonde handed Dublin over to a parliamentarian army under Michael Jones. The Confederates now tried to eliminate the remaining parliamentarian outposts in Dublin and Cork, but in 1647 suffered a series of military disasters. First, Thomas Preston's Leinster army was destroyed by Jones's parliamentarians at the Battle of Dungan's Hill in County Meath. Then, less than three months later, the Confederates' Munster army met a similar fate at the hands of Inchiquin's parliamentarian forces at the battle of Knocknanauss.

These setbacks made most Confederates much more eager to come to reach an agreement with the royalists and negotiations were re-opened. The Supreme Council received generous terms from Charles I and Ormonde, including toleration of the Catholic religion, a commitment to repealing Poyning's Law (and therefore to Irish self-government), recognition of lands taken by Irish Catholics during the war, and a commitment to a partial reversal of the Plantation of Ulster. In addition, there was to be an Act of Oblivion, or amnesty for all acts committed during the 1641 rebellion and Confederate wars – in particular the killings of British Protestant settlers in 1641 – combined with no disbanding of the Confederate armies.

However, Charles granted these terms only out of desperation and later repudiated them. Under the terms of the agreement, the Confederation was to dissolve itself, place its troops under royalist commanders and accept English royalist troops. Inchiquin also defected from the Parliament and rejoined the royalists in Ireland.

== Civil War within the Confederation ==
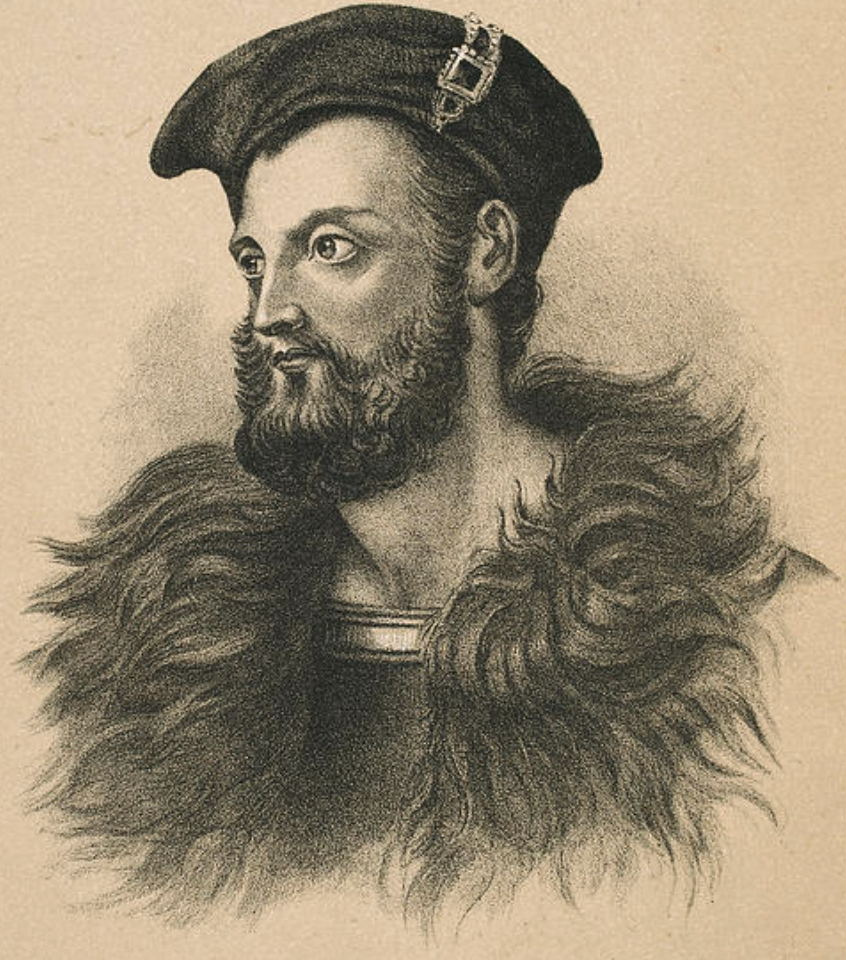
Engraving copy of portrait of Owen Roe O'Neill

However, many of the Irish Catholics continued to reject a deal with the royalists. Owen Roe O'Neill refused to join the new royalist alliance and fought a brief internal civil war with the royalists and Confederates in the summer of 1648. So alienated was O'Neill by what he considered to be a betrayal of Catholic war aims that he tried to make a separate peace with the English Parliament and was for a short time effectively an ally of the English parliamentary armies in Ireland. This was disastrous for the wider aims of the Confederacy, as it coincided with the outbreak of the second civil war in England. The Papal Nuncio, Rinuccini, endeavoured to uphold Owen Roe O'Neill by excommunicating all who in May 1648 took part in the Inchiquin Truce with the Royalists; but he could not get the Irish Catholic Bishops to agree on the matter. On 23 February 1649, he embarked at Galway, in his own frigate, to return to Rome.

It is often argued that this split within the Confederate ranks represented a split between Gaelic Irish and Old English. It is suggested that a particular reason for this was that Gaelic Irish had lost much land and power since the English conquest of Ireland and hence had become radical in their demands. However, there were members of both ethnicities on each side. For example, Phelim O'Neill, the Gaelic Irish instigator of the Rebellion of 1641, sided with the moderates, whereas the predominantly Old English south Wexford area rejected the peace. The Catholic clergy were also split over the issue.

The real significance of the split was between those landed gentry who were prepared to compromise with the royalists as long as their lands and civil rights were guaranteed, and those, such as Owen Roe O'Neill, who wanted to completely overturn the English presence in Ireland. They wanted an independent, Catholic Ireland, with the English and Scottish settlers expelled permanently. Many of the militants were most concerned with recovering ancestral lands their families had lost in the plantations. After inconclusive skirmishing with the Confederates, Owen Roe O'Neill retreated to Ulster and did not rejoin his former comrades until Cromwell's invasion of 1649. This infighting fatally hampered the preparations of the Confederate-royalist alliance to repel the invasion of parliamentarian New Model Army.

== Cromwell's invasion ==
Oliver Cromwell, who conquered Ireland on behalf of the English Parliament

Oliver Cromwell invaded Ireland in 1649 to crush the new alliance of Irish Confederates and royalists. The Cromwellian conquest of Ireland was the bloodiest warfare that had ever occurred in the country and was accompanied by plague and famine. Kilkenny fell after a short siege in 1650. It ended in total defeat for the Irish Catholics and royalists. The pre-war Irish Catholic land-owning class was all but destroyed in this period, as were the institutions of the Roman Catholic Church. Most of the senior members of the Confederation spent the Cromwellian period in exile in France, with the English Royalist Court. After the Restoration, those Confederates who had promoted alliance with the Royalists found themselves in favour and on average recovered about a third of their lands. However, those who remained in Ireland throughout the Interregnum generally had their land confiscated, with prisoners of war executed or transported to penal colonies.

== Significance ==
Confederate Ireland's style of parliament was similar to the landed oligarchy Parliament of Ireland established by the Normans in 1297, but it was not based on a democratic vote. Given their large notional power base, the Confederates ultimately failed to manage and reorganise Ireland so as to defend the interests of Irish Catholics. The Irish Confederate Wars and the ensuing Cromwellian conquest of Ireland (1649–53) caused massive loss of life and ended with the confiscation of almost all Irish Catholic-owned land in the 1650s, though some was re-granted in the 1660s. The end of the period cemented the English colonisation of Ireland in the so-called Cromwellian Settlement.

== See also ==
- History of Ireland
- History of Ireland (1534–1691)
- Confederation

== Sources ==
- Austin, Sister M. Stanislaus (1913), "O'Reilly, Hugh", in Herbermann, Charles George (ed.), Catholic Encyclopedia, vol. 11, New York: The Encyclopedia Press, p. 294
- Carte, Thomas (1851), The Life of James Duke of Ormond, vol. 3 (new ed.), Oxford: Oxford University Press – 1643 to 1660
- Cusack, Mary Francis (1871), A Compendium of Irish History, Boston: Patrick Donahoe
- Lowe, Lowe (1964). "Charles I and the Confederation of Kilkenny, 1643–9". Irish Historical Studies. 14 (53): 1–19. doi:10.1017/S002112140002006X. JSTOR 30006355. S2CID 164190317.
- Meehan, Rev. Charles Patrick (1882), The Confederation of Kilkenny (New revised and enlarged ed.), Dublin: James Duffy
