= Covenanter Army in Ireland =

Scottish army sent to Ireland during the Wars of the Three Kingdoms

- Active: 1642–1649
- Country: Kingdom of Scotland
- Allegiance: Covenanters
- Branch: Army
- Type: Infantry and cavalry
- Size: ~10,000 at peak
- Engagements: Irish Confederate Wars

Commanders
- Notable commanders: Robert Monro

The Covenanter Army in Ireland was a Scottish force active during the Wars of the Three Kingdoms (1642–1649). It was sent to Ireland in April 1642 to support Protestant settlers and oppose Irish Confederate troops.

== See also ==
- Solemn League and Covenant
- James Graham, 1st Marquess of Montrose
- New Model Army
- Plantation of Ulster
- Owen Roe O'Neill
- Laggan Army
- Presbytery of Carrickfergus
