= Synnot =

Synnot is a surname. Notable people with the surname include:

- Anthony Synnot (1922–2001), Australian admiral
- Arthur Henry Seton Hart-Synnot (1870–1942), British Army general
- David Synnot (1593–1649), Confederate Ireland officer
- George Synnot (1819–1871), Australian pioneer in Victoria, son of Walter Synnot of Tasmania
- Monckton Synnot (1827–1879), Australian squatter in Victoria, son of Walter Synnot of Tasmania
- Walter Synnot (High Sheriff) (1742–1821), Anglo-Irish landowner in County Armagh
- Timothy Monckton Synnot (1916–1997), Royal Australian Navy officer
- Walter Synnot (colonial settler), British settler in Tasmania, son of Walter Synnot of County Armagh

== See also ==
- Walter Manifold (Walter Synnot Manifold; 1849–1928), Australian grazier and politician
- Sinnott
- Synnott
