= The Explorers and Early Colonists of Victoria =

Photographic montage by Thomas Foster Chuck

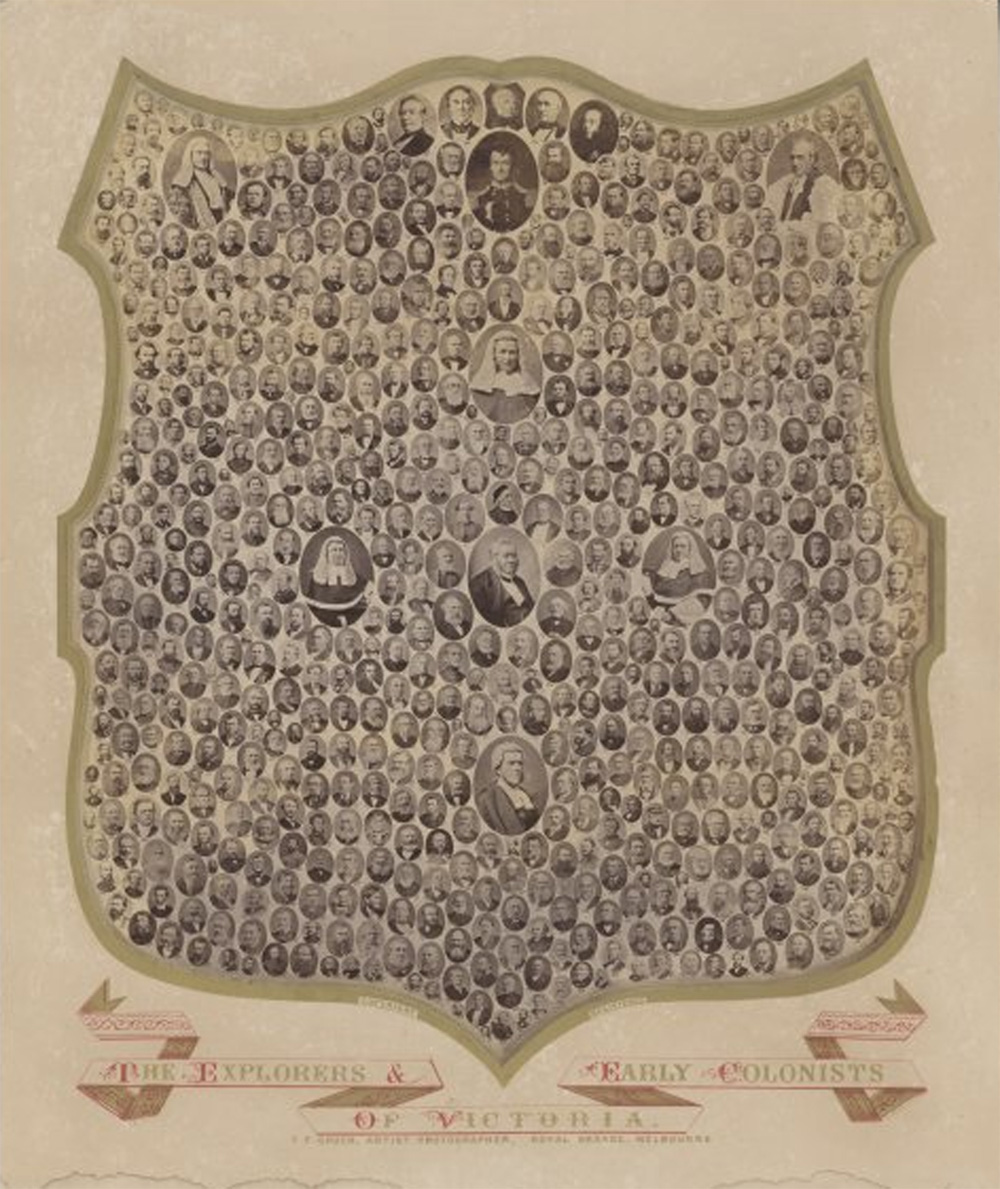
T. F. Chuck's historical photographic montage entitled The Explorers and Early Colonists of Victoria made in 1872. It contains 713 photos.

The Explorers and Early Colonists of Victoria is a historical photographic montage of 1872 by Thomas Foster Chuck (1826–1898). It consists of a framed collection of 713 photographs of the early settlers of Victoria.

== History ==
The project took Chuck three years to complete. To be eligible for inclusion in the montage, the settler must have arrived in Victoria before 1843. To obtain the photos, Chuck photographed some of the surviving settlers, borrowed negatives of others and copied them and photographed portraits and paintings of the more famous.

The original framed photograph is 1.5 metres high and 1.2 metres wide. It was presented to the State Library of Victoria in 1872 is still held by them. Later Chuck made smaller copies 49 cm by 43 cm for sale to the public (see photo at right) with an accompanying index of the names and dates of arrival of those in the montage.

== List of names in the montage ==
Name	Date of arrival	Number in montage
Addison, J	1842	712
Aitcheson, George	1838	523
Aitchison, G. N.	1839	141
Aitken, David	1839	153
Aitken, John	1835	598
Aitken, Thomas	1842	286
Alexander, T. B.	1837	23
Allan, George	1839	524
Allan, J. M.	1839	130
Allan, W. E.	1839	102
Allee, John	1838	45
John Alston	1840	363
Ambrose, James	1841	512
Ambrose, Robert	1842	530
Anderson, Adam	1839	124
Anderson, Colonel	no date of arrival	339
Anderson, Joseph	1838	41
Anderson, Thomas	1838	47
Anketell, John	1841	239
Archer, William	1838	35
Armstrong, David	1839	158
Armstrong, Thomas	1839	131
Armstrong, Thomas	1839	160
Ashley, E(dmund)	1842	145
Ashton, M	1842	471
Azzopardi, A.	1839	84
A’Beckett, Sir William, First Chief Justice	no date of arrival	326
Baillie, Thomas	1839	135
Baird, M. H.	1841	556
Baker, H.	1839	146
Ballingall, James	1840	631
Barber, C. H.	1838	251
Barker, Dr. E.	1840	170
Barling, James	1839	113
Barr, John	1841	249
Barrett, William	1838	43
Barry, Sir Redmond, Knight	1838	60
Barwick, James	1841	713
Batey, Martin	1841	256
Bathe, Dr.	1838	44
Battrick, George	1841	330
Baxter, Captain	1838	704
Bayne, Frederick	1841	697
Baynton, Thomas	1841	257
Bear, J. P., (M. L. C.)	1841	234
Bear, John	1839	540
Bear, John, Senior	1841	513
Beilby, John Wood	1841	303
Belcher, G. F.	1839	118
Belcher, M.	1842	685
Bell, Benjamin	1841	259
Bell, Edward	1840	473
Bell, Henry Munro	1840	489
Bell, William M.	no arrival date	62
Benjamin, __,	no date of arrival	539
Benjamin, David	1838	592
Benjamin, S.	1838	634
Bennett, E.	1840	470
Bennett, J. B.	1842	570
Bennett, John	1840	177
Bershaw, J.	1840	705
Beurlewse, L. A.	1841	606
Black, Dr. T.	1842	340
Black, George	1840	169
Black, Hon. Niel, M. L. C.	1839	341
Bland, John	1841	455
Booth, A.	1840	273
Born, James Ford	1840	176
Boyd, J. S.	1839	139
Boyd, Major	1839	86
Brandt, William	1840	179
Brock, Alexander	1841	238
Brougham, John	1839	132
Brown, Henry E.	1839	121
Brown, J. Lindsay	1840	515
Brown, John	1838	378
Brown, John	1838	40
Bruce, Daniel	1839	268
Bruce, George	1841	329
Buckland, John	1840	168
Budds, Andrew	1837	24
Budge, Henry	1842	616
Burgess, John	1838	432
Burns, Patrick	1840	505
Burrall, George	1840	683
Butchart, James	1839	151
Campbell, D. S.	1839	114
Campbell, Dalmahoy	1840	204
Campbell, Duncan	1838	655
Campbell, Robert	1837	267
Campbell, Robert	1841	316
Campbell, W. H. (M. D.)	1841	579
Capper, J.	1842	356
Carmichael, George	1839	117
Carmichael, William	1839	156
Carne, J. W.	1839	119
Carson, John	1842	569
Cashmore, M.	1840	175
Cassell, H. N.	1840	487
Caulfield, John	1837	13
Chainney, James	1840	178
Chisholm, J. M.	1838	27
Christie, Robert	1838	396
Clark, Alex. J.	1840	375
Clarke, Reay	1838	81
Clarke, Thomas A.	no date of arrival	559
Clarke, W. J. T.	1839	100
Clarke, William	1840	641
Clay, Fred. Lord	1840	231
Clay, J. H.	1838	394
Clay, Rd.	1840	469
Clinton, James	1841	323
Clow, J. M.	1837	568
Clow, Rev. James	1837	601
Clutterbuck, J. B., M. D.	no date of arrival	542
Cobham, F. McCrae	1839	128
Cochran, John	no date of arrival	660
Cochrane, James	1841	261
Cole, Capt. George Ward, R. N.	1839	165
Cole, T. C., Rev.	1841	241
Coleman, S.	1838	589
Colgin, John	1840	173
Colt, Edward	1841	255
Cooke, Henry	1839	510
Cooper, Horatio	1837	20
Cooper, Thomas Paul	1837	566
Coppin, George	no date of arrival	274
Corney, William	1840	211
Cosgrave, John	1838	46
Cottrell, Anthony	1835	18
Cowie, James	1840	166
Craven, Benjamin	1841	260
Creswick, _,	1839	120
Crook, E.	no date of arrival	123
Cropper, W. H.	1839	217
Crowley, Jeremiah	1840	174
Cunningham, Alex. F.	1841	672
Cunningham, Hastings	1842	390
Curdie, Daniel, M. D.	1839	115
Curr, E. M.	1840	235
Currie, John Lang	1841	280
Curtain, Michael	1840	183
Dall, William	1839	126
Dallimore, F. W.	1840	198
Daly, Thomas	1838	479
Damyon, James	1841	674
Davidson, Col. A.	1842	352
Davidson, George	1841	299
Davidson, Henry	1841	295
Davis, Peter	1839	150
Dawson ---,	1838	232
Degraves, Hon. W., M. L. C.	no date of arrival	577
Denby, H, Junior	1841	281
Denby, H., Senior	1841	297
Dennys, A. F.	1841	289
Dickson, Dr. James	1838	50
Dinwoodie, John	1837	25
Disher, W. J.	1842	397
Dobson, L. A.	1840	707
Dods, William	1838	42
Donald, James	1840	533
Donald, William	1842	582
Dooly, James	1841	305
Dougharty, J. G.	1839	431
Douglas, William	1840	192
Dowling, Richard	1839	443
Dredge, Theo.	1839	529
Duncan, David	1840	493
Dunlop, David	1840	222
Dunn, Charles C.	1840	227
Dunn, Edward C.	no date of arrival	594
Dunn, Thomas	1841	308
Easy, William	1839	111
Ebden, Charles Hotson, Treasurer of Colony	1838	558
Eddy, W.	1840	424
Edgar, David	1838	48
Egan, Dennis	1841	325
Ellerman, H. C.	1839	353
Ellery, R. L. J., Govt. Astronomer	no date of arrival	403
Elliott, Sizar J. P.	1840	236
Emerson, George	1842	415
Emerson, William	1842	572
Empson, William	1838	65
Evans, George	1835	6
Fairbairn, George	1839	358
Fairchild, C.	no date of arrival	335
Farie, Claud (Sheriff)	1839	418
Fawkner, John Pascoe	1835	3
Fflean, Henry	1841	331
Finlayson, Graham	1837	254
Fitzgerald, John	1841	411
Fitzgerald, John	1841	682
Forman, Peter	1839	412
Foster, John Best	1838	446
Foster, The Hon J. F. L., Colonial Secretary	no date of arrival	73
Fowler, Daniel	1840	200
Foxton, J. G.	1841	264
Fraser, Hon Alex	1839	104
Fraser, William	1842	561
Frazelle, J.	1841	456
Frenchman, Henry	1840	237
Frost, Robert	1836	437
Fulton, Thomas	1841	348
Furguson, John	1841	468
Furlong, W.	1842	708
Fyans, Capt., F. M.	1836	472
Gatehouse, George	1839	694
Gemmell, H. M. C.	no date of arrival	407
Gemmell, R.	1841	478
Geraghty, P.	1840	212
Gerrand, Hamilton	1839	90
Gill, James	1842	528
Gill, John	1840	371
Gillett, Edward	1840	652
Glass, Hugh	1841	248
Godber, Job	1841	301
Godfrey, F. R.	date of arrival	553
Godfrey, Henry	1842	599
Goldsbrough, R.	no date of arrival	95
Goodman, John	no date of arrival	501
Gordon, James	1840	690
Govett, George	1836	624
Graham, James	1839	108
Graham, Thomas	1837	614
Grant, Thomas	1840	486
Gray, Charles	1839	349
Green, W. J.	1839	461
Greene, Molesworth	1842	379
Greeves, Dr.	no date of arrival	689
Grey, John	1836	30
Grice, Richard	no date of arrival	400
Grove, Thomas	1838	147
Gurner, H. F., Crown Solicitor	1841	334
Guthridge, N., (M. L. C.)	no date of arrival	337
Gwaithin, Captain C.	1840	638
Gwynne, F. A.	1840	544
Hailes, G. B.	1840	194
Haines, Hon. W. C., Chief Secretary	1841	317
Halfpenny, Thomas	1836	430
Hall, Henry	1839	112
Hall, Thomas	1841	368
Hall, William	1840	245
Ham, Theo. Job	1842	359
Hamilton, Robert	1838	526
Hamilton, Robert	no date of arrival	619
Hamilton, W. B.	no date of arrival	625
Hamilton, William	1838	675
Hammond, R. K.	1841	508
Hammond, W. E.	1842	354
Harris, John	1840	218
Harrison, Captain	1840	167
Harrison, Captain George	1842	605
Hart, A. H.	1841	632
Hart, Henri H.	1842	506
Hart, Isaac	1840	604
Hart, the Hon	1834	4
Haskell, George	1840	223
Hatch, William B.	1840	201
Hawthorne, Beilby	1842	360
Hayball, Robert	1841	282
Hayes, Robert	1838	64
Hays, Robert	1838	613
Heales, Hon, R., Chief Secretary	1842	318
Heales, Richard, Senior	1842	460
Henty, Edward	1834	1
Henty, Francis	1834	2
Henty, Hon. Stephen, G. (M. L. C.)	1838	423
Hervey, Hon. Matthew	1839	137
Hervey, William	1840	406
Hetherington, Rev. I.	1842	517
Higgins, Edward	1839	159
Highett, Hon. William, M.L. C.	1838	525
Hill, J.	no date of arrival	709
Hinds, William	1841	310
Hinkins, John Thomas	1842	366
Hobson, Dr.	1840	213
Hoddle, Robert, Surveyor-General	1837	28
Hodgkinson, J.	1838	404
Hodgson, Major	1840	180
Hoffmann, William	1841	344
Hogg, E. J.	no date of arrival	498
Holmes, Matthew	1839	621
Holt, Robert	1841	272
Hood, John	1840	190
Horn, Richard	1835	703
Hovell, Captain	accompanied Hume in 1824	665
Howatt, David	1841	477
Howey, John Werge	1840	534
Howitt, Godfrey, M. D.	1840	185
Huddart, Captain P.	1842	538
Hughes, James B.	1840	686
Hull, Hon. William, (M. L. C.)	1839	285
Hull, W. H.	1842	622
Hume, Hamilton	led expedition to Port Phillip in 1824	664
Hunter, Alexander	1839	88
Hurlstone, Alfred	1839	97
Hurlstone, Peter	1839	92
Hurst, William	1839	484
Hutton, Charles	1838	649
Inglis, Peter	1840	347
Jackson, Thomas	1841	420
Jago, George	1841	440
James, E. T.	1839	706
Jeffry, Daniel	1842	464
Jennings, H.	1837	33
Jennings, Thomas	1837	382
Jerrome, Robert	1840	228
Johnston, Robert	1841	428
Johnston, Arch.	1841	314
Johnston, David	1840	215
Johnston, Hon. J. S.	1840	265
Johnston, Peter	1838	364
Jonas, John	1840	186
Jukes, Henry	1840	466
Kennedy, Patrick	1841	302
Kennon, William	1841	250
Ker, W. L.	1840	547
Kerr, John Hunter	1839	99
Kerr, Robert, J. P.	no date of arrival	336
Kerr, William	no date of arrival	333
Kesterton, William	1841	63
Keys, George	1841	287
Keys, John	1841	699
Keys, Robert	1841	646
Keys, Thomas	1841	700
Keys, William	1840	451
Kidd, William	1841	324
King, W. Oliver	1839	263
Kirk, George	1839	320
Kissock, William	1838	492
Knight, William	1842	647
Kyle, John	1841	276
Kyle, John	1841	656
Kyle, William	1841	450
Kyte, Ambrose	1840	509
La Trobe, His Excellency Charles J.	1839	677
Laidlaw, R.	1840	244
Lang, Thomas	1839	98
Langdon, Captain, T. W.	1837	262
Langhorn, Rev. G.	1836	645
Langhorne, M. A.	1836	12
Lawford, Benjamin	1842	628
Lawrence, W. T.	1842	710
Le Soeuf, Albert	1840	567
Le Souef, Charles	1838	51
Le Souef, William	1840	633
Leigh, Philip	1839	149
Levien, Benjamin	no date of arrival	77
Lewis, Richard	1837	26
Lincolne, Abraham	1838	57
Lloyd, C.	1841	162
Lloyd, George Thomas	1837	21
Lock, W. H.	1842	376
Locke, Charles Junior	1840	402
Locke, William	1840	384
Locke, William, Senior	1840	401
Lockley, J.	1837	541
Lonsdale, Captain William	1835	676
Love, Andrew	1840	189
Lynott, C. A.	1837	14
Macarthur, D. Gordon	1837	362
Macartney, Dean	no date of arrival	275
Macdonald, Angus	1841	252
Macdonald, Dr.	1838	78
Macgregor, Samuel	1840	662
Mack, J. G.	1839	148
Mackenzie, J.	1840	365
Mackenzie, John	1842	659
Macknight, Charles H.	1841	283
Macpherson, Dugald	1840	636
Macpherson, Hon. J. A.	1842	519
Macredie, Robert	1838	673
Mair, Col.	1837	389
Mallon, William	1841	444
Manifold, J.	1842	549
Manifold, Thomas	1840	548
Manton, Charles	1840	391
Manton, Frederick	1839	620
Marlow, Samuel	1837	72
Marris, J. B.	1840	171
Marsden, Joseph Ankors	1841	258
Martin, E.	1839	307
Martin, Peter	1841	313
Mason, Thomas	1841	668
Massie, Robert	1837	110
Matheson, J. (Bank)	1841	425
Matheson, John (Bank of Victoria)	1840	608
Mathews,__, Surveyor	1842	322
Matson, J. M.	1836	439
Mawbey, Henry	1841	596
Mc Clauren, A.	1840	205
McArthur, David C. (Bank)	1839	136
McArthur, Donald G.	1837	452
McCallum, Alex	1838	71
McCaw, Matthew	1841	615
McClean, Niell	1842	351
McCleod, John Norman	1837	661
McCombie, Hon. T., (M. L. C.)	1839	164
McCrae, Captain	1841	279
McDonald, William	1839	575
McEwan, James	1842	516
Macfarlane, Walter	1841	294
McGill, M. A.	no date of arrival	554
McGregor, John	1840	195
McGuire, K. P.	1840	266
McKellar, __,	1841	511
McKellar, Donald	1837	653
McKellar, William	1839	109
McKenzie, Donald	1840	229
McKinnon, Lachlan	no date of arrival	441
McLachlan, Captain D.	1839	581
McLachlan, James	1839	475
McLachlan, John	1839	445
McLachlan, Ronald	1839	507
McLaughlin, Michael	1840	219
McLaurin, James	1840	184
McMain, James	1839	247
McMertrie, David	1839	154
McMillan, A.	1839	485
McMillan, Alex.	1839	545
McNay, James	1839	157
McNichol, J.	1842	627
McNicol, J. W.	1840	546
McPherson, John	1839	562
Menzies, A.	no date of arrival	338
Mercutt, Robert	1838	688
Messenger, F.	1840	243
Michal, H. E.	1840	208
Michel, L. J.	1841	571
Miles, R. G.	1842	398
Miller, Hon. Henry, (M. L. C.)	1839	182
Mitchell, Sir Thomas	1835	663
Moffatt, J.	1841	679
Mollison, Crawford P. M.	1839	642
Monahan, Thomas	1841	270
Monger, William	1839	116
Montgomerie, James	1839	684
Moody, John	1841	417
Moody, R. S. H.	1839	409
Moody, William	1841	416
Moone, John	1839	37
Moor, Henry	1840	474
Moore, James	1840	564
Morgan, Hon. William	1839	555
Morgan, Owen, W.	1839	103
Morrell, Richard	1841	465
Morris, Henry	1841	667
Morrison, John	1840	214
Morrow, J.	1840	393
Morrow, Thomas	1841	458
Mortimer, Hy. Wm.	1839	96
Morton, Lockhart	1840	226
Morton, William	1841	277
Moss, John	1837	611
Moss, Rev. William	no date of arrival	698
Mowatt, W.	1839	144
Mullan, Charles	1841	300
Murchison, John	1838	58
Murison, Andrew	1841	535
Murphy, James	1839	626
Murphy, P.	1842	355
Murphy, Sir Francis,	1842	321
Murphy, Walter	1840	220
Murray, Robert	1840	203
Must, Thomas	1842	637
Napier, Thomas	1837	19
Nelson, John Gill	1842	612
Nicholson, Germain	1842	531
Nicholson, Hon. William (Chief Secretary)	no date of arrival	332
Nicholson, W. H.	1840	381
Nimmo, William,	1838	61
Nixon, Ralph	1837	588
Nolan, David	1842	386
Northcote, Captain	1842	711
Norton, Charles	1842	357
O’Brien, Hugh	1841	304
O’Brien, Patrick	1840	230
O’Farrell, M. Junior	1840	640
O’Farrell, M.	1841	630
O’Shanassy, Hon. J. (Chief Secretary)	1839	152
O’Shea, Michael	1840	221
Ogilvy, David	1840	199
Oliver, William	1837	426
Orr, F. M.	1839	89
Orr, Henry Adair	1839	609
Orr, James	1839	480
Orr, James	1839	79
Orr, John	1839	122
Orr, Joseph	1840	216
Osbourn, Richard	1837	395
Overton, William	1840	181
Palmer, Sir James	1840	290
Park, James	1840	392
Parker, E. T.	1837	557
Parker, Joseph	1838	563
Parker, Richard	1839	590
Passmore, J. C.	1840	191
Paterson, Edward	1837	31
Patterson, Alex.	1841	271
Patterson, Robert	1842	377
Peddle, Cornelius	1841	481
Peers, Edward	1837	388
Pender, William	1837	643
Perregalli, Antonio	1842	495
Perry, Right Rev. C., Lord Bishop of Melbourne	1847	678
Phillips, George	1841	163
Pinkerton, G.	1840	413
Pinnock, J. D.	1841	278
Pohlman, R. W. (Judge)	1837	82
Pollard, Joseph	1840	496
Pollard, Rev. G.	no date of arrival	629
Pope, Edward	1841	447
Porter, G. W.	1839	593
Porter, J. A.	1839	607
Powell, Thomas	1839	681
Powell, Walter	no date of arrival	591
Powlett, F. A.	1839	408
Purbrick, W. J.	1839	639
Purcelle, John	1841	459
Quarterman, John	1839	106
Rae, James	1841	578
Rankin, Henry	1839	306
Rankin, John	1838	67
Raven, W. G.	1841	311
Reeves, Robert	1839	107
Reid, David	1837	602
Richardson, Joseph	1842	536
Richardson, Robert	1840	670
Rickett, David C.	1839	140
Ricketts, Thomas J.	1839	129
Roberts, George	1840	346
Roberts, Joseph	1837	36
Robertson, A. S.	1840	522
Robertson, George	1840	617
Robertson, Hugh	1840	202
Robertson, J.	1841	635
Robertson, Thomas	1840	691
Robertson, William	1838	49
Robins, Thomas	1840	385
Robinson, Charles	1839	380
Robinson, G. A.	1839	600
Robinson, Robert	1840	197
Robinson, William H.	1839	161
Ronald, Dr.	1841	291
Roney, Philip	1841	292
Rooney, Daniel	1841	491
Ross, Col. T. H.	no date of arrival	75
Rostron, Laurence	1842	361
Rowe, F.	1840	438
Rowed, A. C.	1839	476
Rowley, James, E.	1838	419
Rucker, W. F. A.	1837	32
Ruffey, A. W.	1839	143
Rusden, G. W.	1834	39
Russell, Robert	1836	623
Russell, Thomas	1842	494
Rutherford, J.	no date of arrival	680
Rutledge, William	1838	68
Ryan, Charles	1837	253
Savage, Robert	1839	127
Scott, A.	1839	687
Scott, C., Senior	no date of arrival	543
Scott, John	1837	17
Scott, Peter	1840	193
Selby, G. W.	1840	206
Shadforth, Robert W., P. M.	1836	560
Sharp, Peter	1839	527
Sharp, William	1837	520
Shaw, H. S.	1841	240
Sheppard, Sherbrne	1841	312
Sheridan, Robert	1840	246
Shrewbridge, John	1838	74
Sidebottom __,	no date of arrival	657
Sievewright, Marcus	1839	138
Simeon, J.	1837	434
Simson, D. C.	1829	435
Simson, Hector N.	1838	155
Sinclair, James	1837	22
Skeene, William	1840	650
Skene, William	1840	210
Sladen, Hon. Charles	1842	552
Sleight, John	1842	658
Sloman, Robert G.W.	1839	467
Smith, Alex.	1841	565
Smith, Ebenezer	1842	463
Smith, James	1836	504
Smith, John Matthew	no date of arrival	595
Smith, John Thomas	1842	503
Smith, Robert	1841	284
Snodgrass, Peter	1840	319
South, G. B.	1840	370
Sparrow, W. C.	1838	648
Stanbridge, W. E.	1841	576
Stanway, __,	no date of arrival	350
Stanway, John	1841	696
Staughton, Simon	1839	105
Stawell, Sir W.,	1839	87
Stevenson, R. B.	1841	405
Stewart, James	no date of arrival	497
Stewart, T. W.	1839	91
Stoke, E.	1841	488
Stoke, Henry	1842	483
Stone, Charles	1838	59
Stone, E. J.	1840	453
Stone, Robert	1838	69
Street, Frederick	1837	34
Strode, Thomas	1838	70
Sturt, Captain Charles, Explorer	1829	666
Sturt, E. P. S. (P. M.)	1840	610
Sugden, William, J.	1838	52
Sumner, T. J.	1842	225
Sutcliffe, Richard	1841	374
Sutherland, George	1838	56
Sutherland, Joseph	1836	10
Sutherland, Robert	1837	55
Swanson, George	1839	692
Swords, James	1840	209
Synot, Albert	1839	328
Synnot, George	1837(?)	414
Synot, Monkton	1839	327
Taylor, John	1841	462
Thom, Archibald	1837	433
Thomas, David John M. D.	1842	654
Thomas, George	1841	288
Thomas, William David	1840	315
Thomas, William	1838	618
Thompson, M. D.	1837	16
Thompson, Robert	no date of arrival	427
Thomson, John	1841	269
Thomson, John	1842	671
Thornton, Hy Scott	1835	83
Thwaites __, Senior	1842	422
Thwaites, George	1842	367
Thwaites, T.	1842	573
Toby, Captain	1836	11
Tolmie, Ewen	1840	187
Tolson, Joseph	1838	514
Tracey, John	1841	296
Trangmar, James	1842	343
Treacey, Martin	1839	372
Treacey, R. M.	1841	587
Trotman, Thomas	1838	76
Tuckett, _,	1837	101
Tuckfield, Rev. J. W.	1838	454
Turnbull, J. F.	1840	644
Turnbull, Patrick	1841	537
Turner, J.	1842	597
Turner, William	1837	38
Umphelby, T. S.	1841	550
Umphelby, W.	no date of arrival	580
Urquart, R.	1840	457
Urquart, W. S.	1841	298
Urquhart, George	1837	54
Vaughan, Charles, M. L. C.	1841	521
Vernon, Edward	1839	702
Vinge, H.	1840	482
Walker, Alex	1839	94
Walker, Hugh	1839	399
Walker, R. C.	1839	134
Wall, James E.	1837	442
Wall, Joseph	1841	309
Wallace, Alex.	1840	383
Walsh, Thomas	1841	369
Warman, James	1840	207
Watt, Ross	1842	387
Watton, Ludlow	1840	551
Webb, James	no date of arrival	342
Webb, R. S.	1838	651
Wedge, Charles	1835	8
Wedge, Henry	1838	53
Wedge, John Helder	1835	7
Wedge, John	1838	66
Wedge, Richard	1835	9
Were, J. B.	1839	133
West, James	1836	242
Westgarth, William	no date of arrival	574
Wharmby, James	1841	373
Whelan, Tim	1840	233
Whitby, Edward	no date of arrival	449
White, A. B.	1838	293
White, Henry John	1839	142
White, J. B.	no date of arrival	436
White, J. E.	1841	518
White, John	1842	695
Wight, E. Byam	1841	500
Wilkie, D. E. M. D.	1839	532
Wilkinson, Thomas	1840	188
Wilkinson, Thomas	no date of arrival	502
Williams, Mr. Justice (Supreme Court)	1839	80
Williamson, C.	1839	421
Wills, Horatio Spencer	1837	15
Wills, John	1840	196
Wilmot, William Byam	1839	410
Wilson, Edward	1839	93
Wilson, James	1839	125
Wilson, John	1840	490
Wilson, Joseph Waters	1837	29
Wilson, Rev. James	1839	85
Wilton, John, J. P.	1840	224
Winter, John	1841	669
Winter, John	1841	701
Wintle, George	1840	345
Woolley, Alfred	1839	499
