= Walter Synnot =

Walter Synnot may refer to:

- Sir Walter Synnot (High Sheriff) (1742–1821), High Sheriff of Armagh
- Walter Synnot (colonial settler), his son, settler of Tasmania
