= Manifold (surname) =

Manifold is a surname, and may refer to:

- Albert Manifold (born 1962), Irish businessman
- Graham Bowman-Manifold (1871–1940), British Army general
- James Chester Manifold (1867–1918), Australian politician
- John Manifold (1915–1985), Australian poet
- Peter Manifold (1817–1885), English pastoralist and politician in Australia
- Thomas Manifold (1809–1875), Australian politician
- Thomas Chester Manifold (1897–1979), Australian politician and racehorse breeder
- Walter Manifold (Walter Synnot Manifold; 1849–1928), Australian grazier and politician
