= George Horne =

George Horne may refer to:

- George Horne (bishop) (1730–1792), Church of England bishop
- George Horne (ice hockey) (1904–1929), Canadian ice hockey player
- George Horne (politician) (1811–1873), politician in the electoral district of Warrnambool, Victoria, Australia
- George Horne (rugby union) (born 1995), Scottish rugby union player

== See also ==
- George Henry Horn (1840–1897), American entomologist
