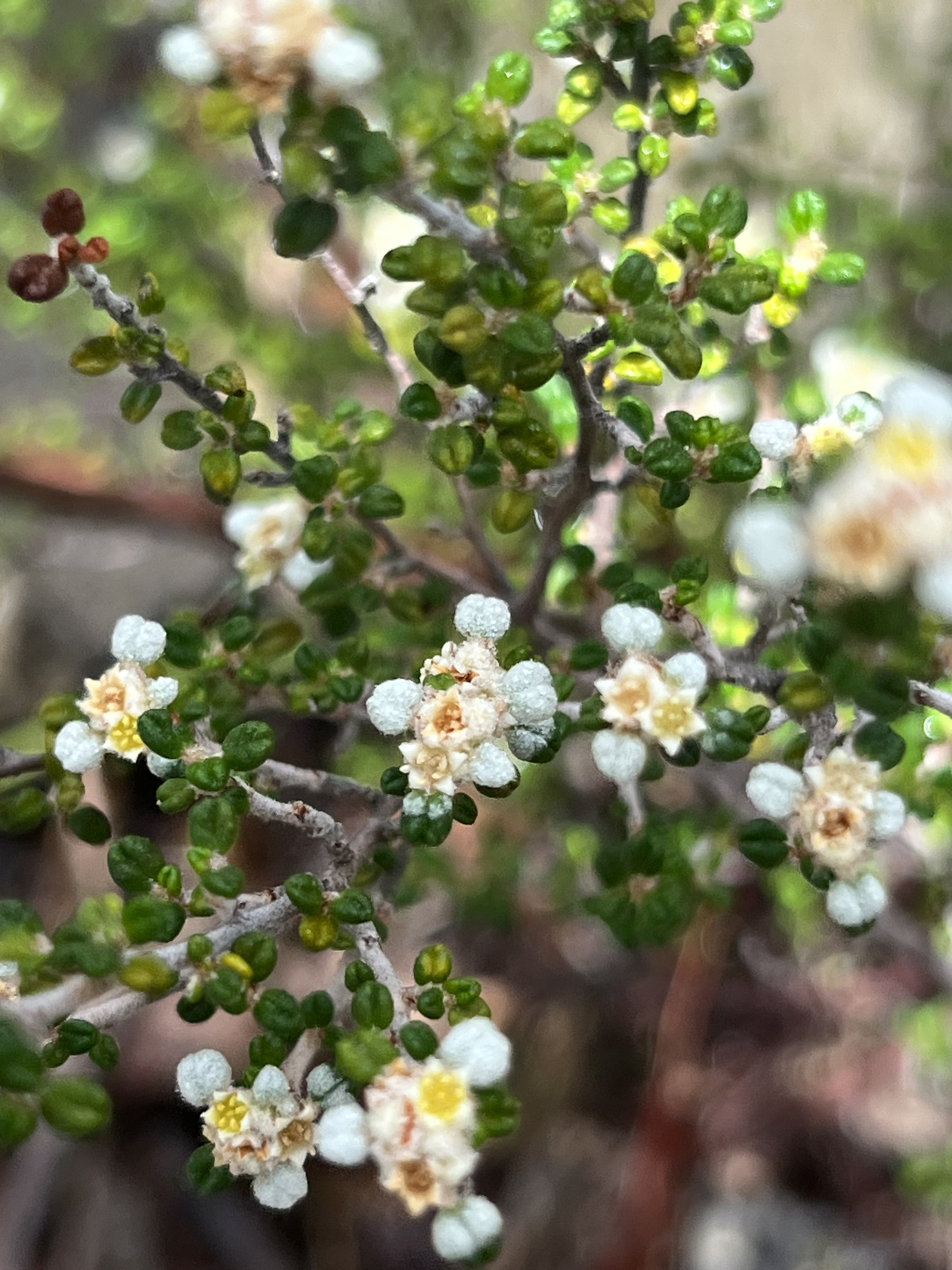
- Flowers and leaves in the ANBG

Conservation status
- Endangered (EPBC Act)

Scientific classification
- Kingdom: Plantae
- Clade: Tracheophytes
- Clade: Angiosperms
- Clade: Eudicots
- Clade: Rosids
- Order: Rosales
- Family: Rhamnaceae
- Genus: Spyridium
- Species: S. lawrencei

Binomial name
- Spyridium lawrencei (Hook.f.) Benth.

= Spyridium lawrencei =

Species of shrub

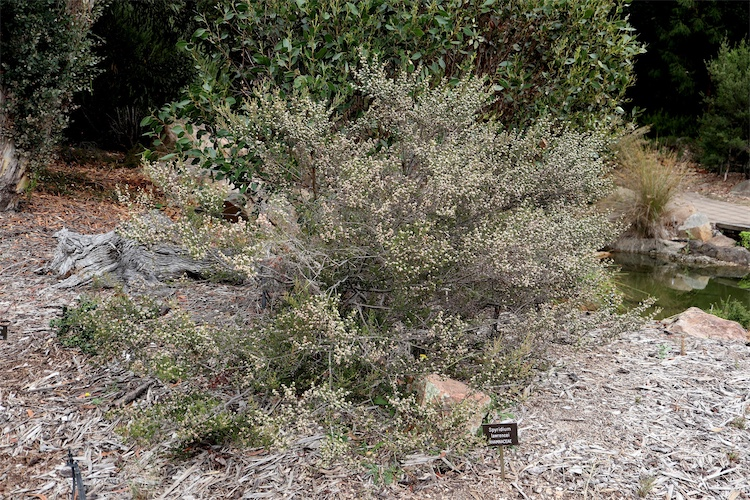
Habit in the Australian National Botanic Gardens

Spyridium lawrencei, commonly known as small-leaf spyridium or small-leaf dustymiller, is a species of flowering plant in the family Rhamnaceae and is endemic to Tasmania. It is an erect, compact or straggling shrub with small, leathery, round to heart-shaped leaves, and dense heads of hairy, cream-coloured flowers.

== Description ==
Spyridium lawrencei is a woody shrub that typically grows to a height of up to 1.0–1.5 m (3 ft 3 in – 4 ft 11 in) and has many wiry branches. The leaves are thick, leathery, heart-shaped or more or less round and 2–4 mm (0.079–0.157 in) long with the edges curved downwards. The upper surface of the leaves is more or less glabrous and the lower surface is densely hairy. The heads or "flowers" are arranged on the ends of branchlets, surrounded by whitish, velvety floral leaves, the individual flowers cream-coloured, about 2 mm (0.079 in) wide with densely hairy bracts and sepals. Flowering occurs from late November to April, with a peak in February.

== Taxonomy ==
This species was first formally described in 1855 by Joseph Dalton Hooker who gave it the name Cryptandra lawrencei in The botany of the Antarctic voyage of H.M. Discovery ships Erebus and Terror from specimens collected by Ronald Campbell Gunn. In 1863, George Bentham changed the name to Spyridium lawrencei in Flora Australiensis. The specific epithet (lawrencei) honours Robert William Lawrence who discovered the species.

== Distribution and habitat ==
Spyridium lawrencei grows in the zone between riversides and woodland or forest on the central east coast and eastern midlands of Tasmania, mainly near to Swan, Apsley and St Paul Rivers.

== Conservation status ==
This species of spyridium is listed as "endangered" under the Australian Government Environment Protection and Biodiversity Conservation Act 1999 and the Tasmanian Government Threatened Species Protection Act 1995. The main threats to the species include changes in fire regimes, grazing and weed invasion, especially by gorse (Ulex europaeus).
