= Aghincurk =

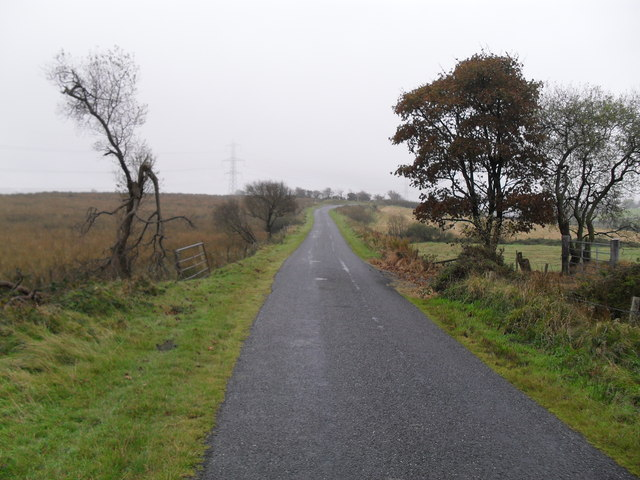
- Aghincurk townland in 2009
- County: Armagh
- Country: Northern Ireland
- Sovereign state: United Kingdom
- Postcode district: BT35
- Dialling code: 028

Aghincurk is a townland of 1,165 acres in County Armagh, Northern Ireland. It is situated in the civil parish of Ballymyre and the historic barony of Fews Upper.

== See also ==
- List of townlands in County Armagh
