= Cavanakill =

Cavanakill: Irish: Cabhan na Cille
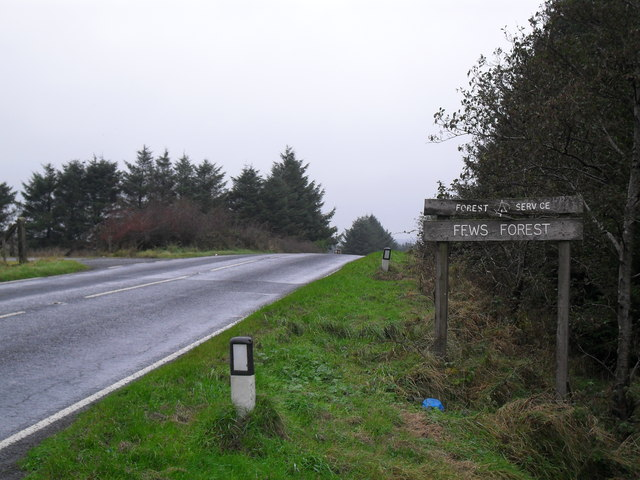
- Cavanakill townland in 2009
- County: Armagh
- Country: Northern Ireland
- Sovereign state: United Kingdom
- Postcode district: BT35
- Dialling code: 028

Cavanakill (from Irish Cabhan na Cille, meaning 'hill of the church') is a townland of 1,473 acres in County Armagh, Northern Ireland. It is situated in the civil parish of Ballymyre and the historic barony of Fews Upper.

== See also ==
- List of townlands in County Armagh
