= Sinnott =

Sinnott is a surname of Anglo-Norman origin, derived from the personal name Sigenoth, meaning "victory" (sige) and boldness (nōth) in Old English. The name was brought to Ireland during the Norman invasion in the 12th century and became strongly associated with County Wexford, where the Sinnott family established themselves as prominent landowners. Over time, the name evolved into several variants, including Synnott, Sinnett, and Sennett. Today, Sinnott remains a distinctly Irish surname, despite its Anglo-Norman roots, and is found among Irish diaspora communities worldwide.

== People ==
Notable people with the surname include:

=== Arts and entertainment ===
- Declan Sinnott (born 1950), Irish-born musician and producer
- Joe Sinnott (1926–2020), American comic book artist
- Kevin Sinnott (born 1947), Welsh painter
- Lillian Sinnott (1890–1914), American actress
- Mack Sennett (born Michael Sinnott) (1880–1960), actor, director and producer
- Paul Sinnott (musician), English drummer
- Richard Sinnott (born 1963), English actor
- Will Sinnott (1960–1991), Scottish musician and songwriter

=== Politics ===
- Edward Sinnott (1864–1936), Canadian politician from Newfoundland
- Herbert Arthur Sinnott (1871–?), Canadian politician from Alberta
- John Sinnott (politician) (1905–1960), Canadian politician
- Joseph E. Sinnott (born c. 1966), American politician from Pennsylvania
- Kathy Sinnott (born 1950), Irish disability rights campaigner and politician
- Nicholas J. Sinnott (1870–1929), American politician from Oregon

=== Science ===
- Edmund Ware Sinnott (1888–1968), American botanist and author
- Rick Sinnott, American biologist

=== Sports ===
- Ben Sinnott (born 2002), American football player
- Conor Sinnott (born 1986), Irish footballer
- Garrett Sinnott (born 1987), Irish hurler
- Gerry Sinnott (born 1951), Irish equestrian
- Jordan Sinnott (1994–2020), English footballer
- Lee Sinnott (born 1965), Irish football player and manager
- Nicola Sinnott (born 1987), Irish footballer
- Paul Sinnott (born 1986), Irish footballer
- Stellah Sinnott (born 1962), camogie manager
- Todd Sinnott (born 1992), Australian golfer

=== Other ===
- Fiona Sinnott, disappeared in Ireland in 1998
- John Sinnott (VC) (1829–1896), Irish recipient of the Victoria Cross
- Joseph F. Sinnott (1837–1906), Irish businessman who emigrated to Pennsylvania
- Richard Sinnott (academic) (1947–2022), Irish academic, political commentator and broadcaster
- Steve Sinnott (1951–2008), British trade unionist
- William Sinnott (1886–1965), American detective and Congressional Gold Medal recipient

== See also ==
- Sinnott Township, Minnesota
- Synnott
- Synnot
