= Antonio Azzopardi =

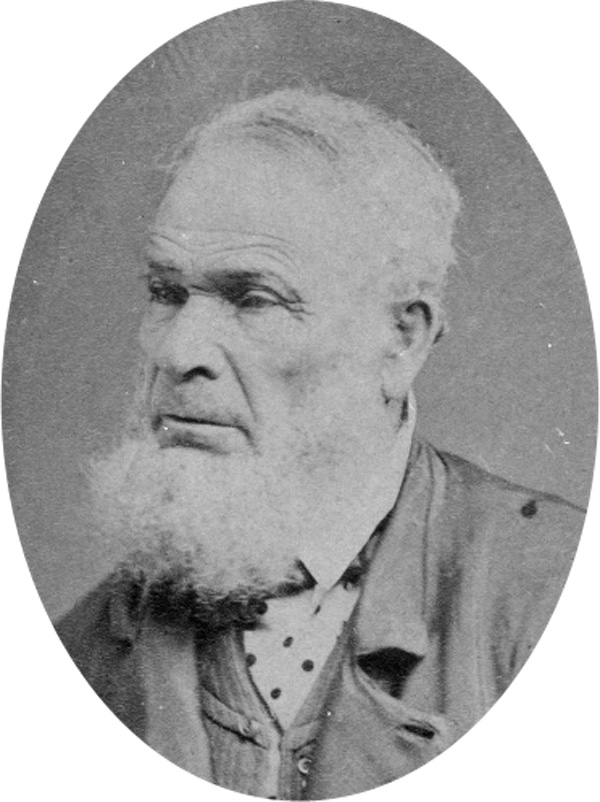
Antonio Azzopardi (1805 - 1881), first Maltese emigrant to Australia and early colonist of Victoria

Antonio Azzopardi (25 January 1805 – 23 January 1881) was the first Maltese free settler in Australia

== Personal life ==
Azzopardi was born in Żejtun, Malta to merchant Angelo Azzopardi and his wife Euphemia Cachia and emigrated to Victoria on board the Mary Hay in 1839. He was a seaman for the first few years after his arrival and married Margaret Hannah Sandeman (1818-1912), from Perth, Scotland on 23 October 1845 at the Collins Street Melbourne Independent Congregational Church. He worked as a mail contractor and then a canvasser for the Melbourne Herald. Later Azzopardi bought a printing press and became a printer. He died in 1881 at his residence 5 Erin Street, North Richmond.

== Legacy ==
Azzopardi is included in the photographic montage published by Thomas Foster Chuck in 1872 entitled The Explorers and Early Colonists of Victoria. He is number 84 in the montage and is listed as “A. Azzopardi”.

Notable descendants include Australian Ambassador Noel St Clair Deschamps (1908-2005), World War II Australian Army Captain Paul Warnford Deschamps (1915-1976), awarded the Military Cross for gallantry during the War in the Pacific and artists Angelo James Azzopardi (1846-1896) and Marguerite Henriette Mahood (née Callaway) (1901-1989).

== See also ==
- Maltese Australian

== Sources ==
- Jupp, J. (2001) The Australian people: an encyclopedia of the nation, its people and their origins, Cambridge University Press: Cambridge. ISBN 9780521807890.
