= Andrew Budds =

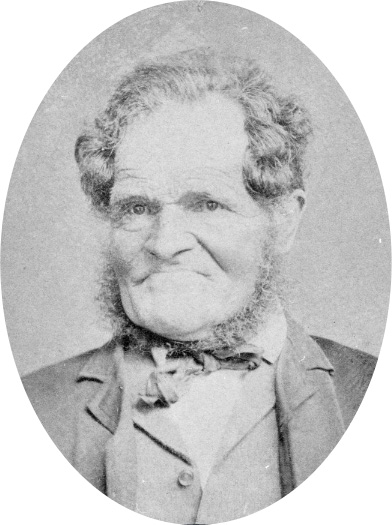
Andrew Budds (1809–1893), early colonist of Victoria.

Andrew Budds (1809–1893) is included in the famous photographic montage, published by Thomas Foster Chuck in 1872, entitled The Explorers and Early Colonists of Victoria. He appears as number 24 in the montage, and is listed as having arrived in Victoria, Australia in 1837.

Budds was born in Queens County, Ireland in 1809. He emigrated to Australia in 1837 and married Elisa Morrison in Launceston, Tasmania that same year, before settling in Victoria. He died in 1893 at the age of 84 at his residence in Highett Street, Richmond.
