= Manifold (disambiguation) =

A manifold is an abstract mathematical space which, in a close-up view, resembles the spaces described by Euclidean geometry.

Manifold may also refer to:

== Arts and music ==
- Manifold (comics), a fictional character in Marvel Comics publications
- Manifold Records, a record label
- Manifold Trilogy, by science fiction author Stephen Baxter

== Engineering ==
- Manifold (fluid mechanics), a machine element used to split or combine a fluid
  - Hydraulic manifold, a component used to regulate fluid flow in a hydraulic system, thus controlling the transfer of power between actuators and pumps
  - Manifold (scuba), in a scuba set, connects two or more diving cylinders
  - Vacuum gas manifold, a piece of apparatus used in chemistry to manipulate gases
  - Exhaust manifold, an engine part which collects the exhaust gases from multiple cylinders into one pipe
  - Inlet manifold or "intake manifold", an engine part which supplies the air or fuel/air mixture to the cylinders

== Mathematics ==
- Manifold, an abstract mathematical space which, in a close-up view, resembles the spaces described by Euclidean geometry.
  - Manifold (magazine), a former magazine of the University of Warwick mathematical community
  - Topological manifold, a topological space which is a locally Euclidean Hausdorff space
    - Almost complex manifold
    - Algebraic manifold
    - Analytic manifold
    - Calabi–Yau manifold
    - Complex manifold, a manifold over the complex numbers
    - Differentiable manifold
    - Einstein manifold
    - Flag manifold
    - Flat manifold
    - G2 manifold
    - Hermitian manifold
    - Iwasawa manifold
    - Orientable manifold

== People ==
- Manifold (surname)

== Places ==
- Manifold, Pennsylvania, US
- Cape Manifold, headland in Queensland, Australia
- River Manifold, a river in Staffordshire, West Midlands, England
  - Manifold Way, a footpath and cycleway following the route of a former railway

== Science ==
- Manifold (fluid mechanics), a machine element used to split or combine a gas or liquid
  - various applications such as automotive exhaust manifolds: see Engineering section
- Vacuum manifold, in quantum field theory

== Software ==
- Manifold System, a geographic information system software package
- ManifoldCF, Apache Software Foundation open-source project for transferring content between repositories or search indexes
- Manifold (prediction market), a reputation-based prediction market
