= Walter Synnot (High Sheriff) =

Anglo-Irish landowner in County Armagh (1742–1821)

Sir Walter Synnot (1742–1821) was an Anglo-Irishman who served as High Sheriff of Armagh.

== Biography ==
Synnot was the son of Richard Synnot. He settled in the parish of Ballymoyer, County Armagh in 1778 and leased eight townlands from the See of Armagh.

The family had originally been large landowners in the County of Wexford, but their lands were taken from them by Cromwell, after Colonel David Synnot resisted Cromwell's troops at the Sack of Wexford. The family was involved not only in the linen trade but also owned lead mines in the vicinity.

According to Lewis's Topographical Dictionary of Ireland (1837): "The lands were heathy and barren previously to 1778, when Sir Walter Synnot erected a house and became a resident landlord; scarcely a tree or shrub was to be seen, and the agricultural implements were of the rudest kind. He constructed good roads in the vicinity, planted forest trees to a considerable extent, and by his example and liberal encouragement of every improvement both as to their habitations and system of agriculture, affected a great change in the habits of the peasantry, and in the appearance of the country, which is now in an excellent state of cultivation, yielding abundant produce; the cultivation of green crops has been introduced, and is practised with success."

Ballymoyer House was described in the Parliamentary Gazetter of 1844 as follows: "The mansion built by Sir Walter Synnot and the demesne attached to it is laid out and planted in a tasteful style. Three mountain streams after debouching from the glens of their upper course, unite in the lawn and form a scene both beautiful and romantic."

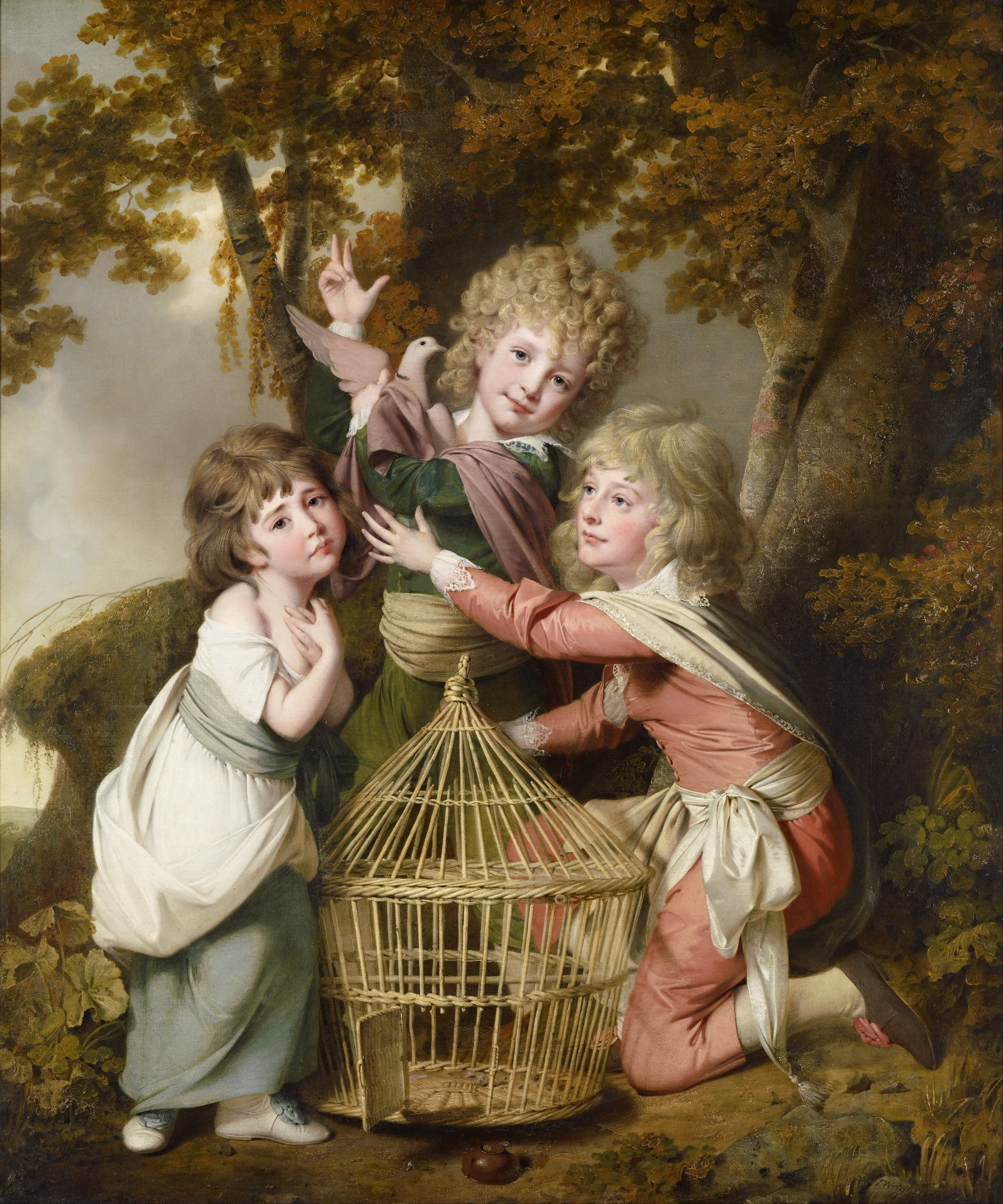
The Synnot Children (Marcus, Walter and Maria) by Joseph Wright of Derby, 1781

Synnot was appointed High Sheriff of Armagh in 1783 and knighted in May of that year.

== Marriage and family ==
Synnot married Jane Seton (a descendant of John Seton, 1st Baron Parbroath and a relative of the American Saint Elizabeth Ann Seton and her grandson Monsignor Robert Seton). They had three children, Marcus, Walter and Maria (who died aged 18). These children are featured in the painting by Joseph Wright of Derby, which was formerly at Ballymoyer but is now in the possession of the National Gallery of Victoria. An etching was made in 1782.

The second son, Captain Walter Synnot, became a colonist in Van Diemen’s Land (Tasmania) with his children, including Monckton Synnot and the family were prominent pastoralists in the Colony of Victoria.

After the death of Jane Seton, Synnot married Ann Elizabeth (née Martin) and had three more children, including Richard Walter Synnot (died 1841), a barrister, who married in 1836 Henrietta Thornton (died 1853), daughter of Henry Thornton. Their children were the subjects of the portrait by George Richmond; they lived with their maternal aunt Marianne Thornton after being orphaned. Synnot lived with his new wife and family in Italy for some years and died in Rome in 1821, where he was buried in the same tomb as his daughter Elizabeth (from second wife). His wife's sister Selina Martin wrote Three Years In Italy which covers this period.

By 1838 the Synnot family had bought the eight townlands and continued to improve the estate. By the latter part of the 1870s they owned 7,321 acres (29.63 km^{2}). In 1901 the demesne had passed through marriage to the Hart-Synnot family who presented it to the National Trust in 1937. Ballymoyer house itself was demolished in 1918 as a result of the damage caused by military occupation during the First World War.

Ballymoyer estate, is still a National Trust property and is open to the public.

Descendants of Synnot included Brigadier-General Arthur Henry Seton Hart-Synnot, Sir Walter Synnot Manifold MP, Geelong woolbroker George Synnot and the Australian Admiral Sir Anthony Synnot.
