= Francis Henty =

Australian settler

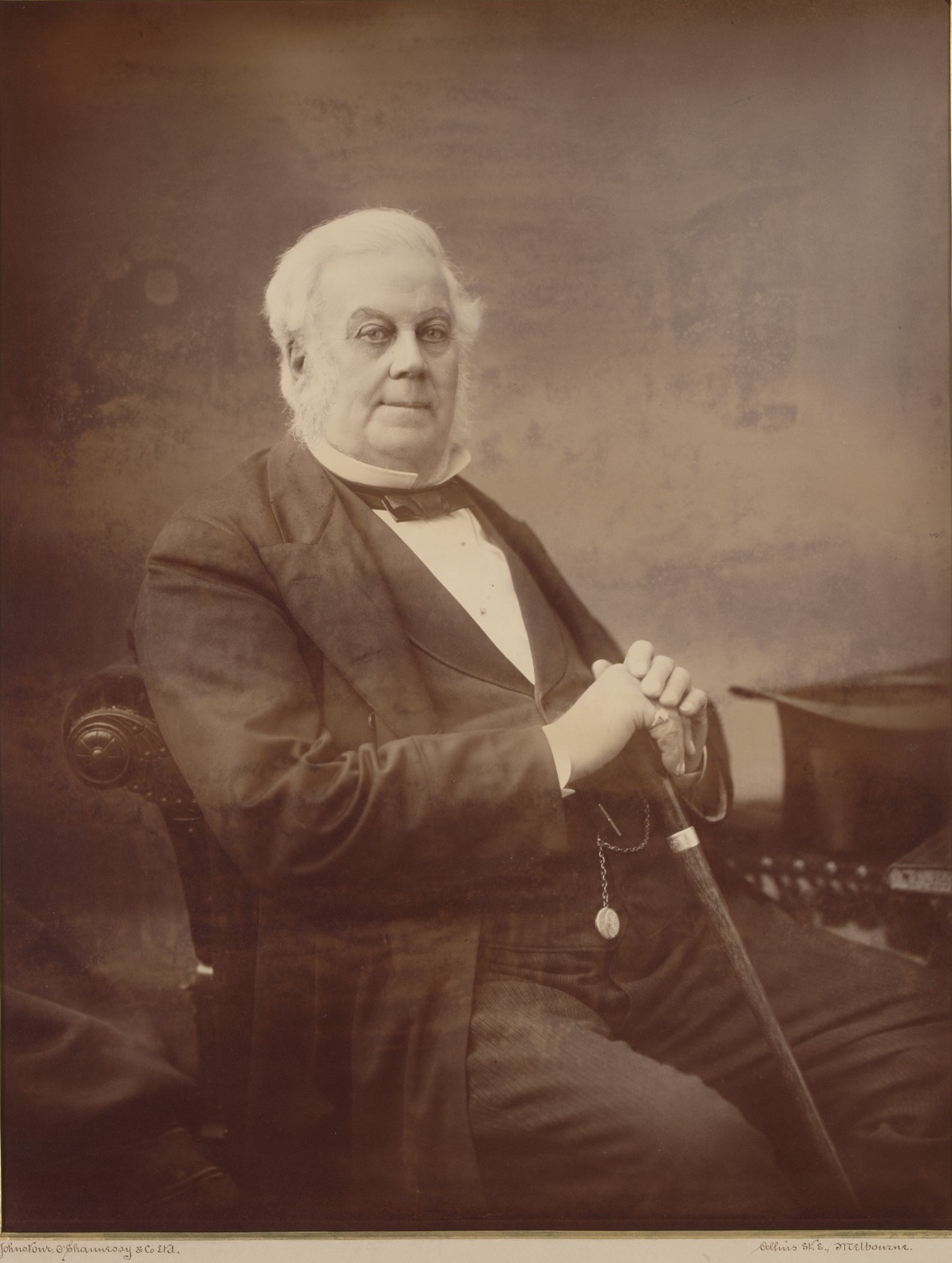
- Portrait of Francis Henty, 1885
- Born: 30 November 1815; Field Place, Worthing, United Kingdom
- Died: 15 January 1889 (aged 73)

Francis Henty (30 November 1815 – 15 January 1889), was an early settler of Australia.

== Family ==
The youngest son of Thomas Henty (1775–1839), and Frances Elizabeth Henty (1777–1848), née Hopkins, Francis Henty was born at Field Place, Worthing, Sussex, on 30 November 1815. He was the younger brother of James Henty (1800–1882), William Henty (1808)–1881) and Edward Henty (1810–1878).

He married Mary Ann Lawrence (1821–1881), the daughter of William Effingham Lawrence, at Launceston, Tasmania, on 5 January 1842. They had four children: one son, and three daughters.

== Background ==
He emigrated to Tasmania with his father in 1832. He subsequently followed his brother Edward to Portland, Victoria, landing a month later than that Edward, on 14 December 1834. Having returned to Tasmania on a visit in the following year, he called in at Port Phillip (now Melbourne) in September, and assisted Mr. Batman, the founder of the city, to pitch a tent on what was afterwards known as Batman's Hill.

"In the last week of August, 1836, Major Mitchell, made his appearance at Portland. At this time there was no one settled nearer Portland than where Melbourne now stands, and the appearance of a stranger was somewhat startling in those days of escaped convicts. However, the major was recognised by one of the establishment. He was furnished with supplies, had the pleasure of witnessing the excitement of a whale chase, and in return informed the Mr. Henty of the existence of the fine country at the back of Portland, on the Wannon River, which he had named Australia Felix.

According to Mennell (1892), at that stage, the Henty Brothers had not gone more than twenty miles inland with their flocks.

The Henty brothers engaged in bay whaling at Portland Bay in the 1830s during the winter months. The whale oil and bone (baleen) taken there from southern right whales was exported to Britain.

"On 3 August 1837, a settlement was commenced in this country [viz., the district around Hamilton, Victoria] at the spot since known as Merino Downs, of which Francis Henty became the owner. Conflicts between the blacks and some of the whites could scarcely be avoided, but Mr. Henty had not much trouble, the aborigines soon becoming friendly; but they were never allowed to bring their spears and other weapons within a certain distance of the hut. To show how quickly the country was taken up after the first essay had been made, it may be mentioned that in 1839 Messrs. James and Stephen G. Henty rode overland from Geelong to Portland, and were able to obtain shelter each night during the whole journey."

== Death ==
Although Francis Henry continued to maintain his establishment at Merino Downs, he resided in Melbourne for the last few years of his life; and he died at his residence in Kew, Victoria on 15 January 1889.

== Shipping ==
There is a passing mention in an article in the Adelaide Observer in 1923 of a ship named Francis Henty which sailed to Melbourne in 1851. It was caught in a typhoon in 1872.

There was also a steam dredge, Francis Henty, built in Glasgow in 1889, by Wm. Simons & Co. Ltd., for the Melbourne Harbour Trust.

== See also ==
- Henty Brothers
