= Synnott =

Synnott is a surname. Notable people with the surname include:

- Andrew Synnott, Irish composer
- Bob Synnott (1912–1985), American basketball player
- Del Synnott (born 1977), Irish actor
- Frank Synnott (1890–1945), Canadian ice hockey player
- Hilary Synnott (1945–2011), British diplomat
- Joe Synnott (1893–1945), Irish Gaelic footballer
- John Synnott (1895–????), Irish Gaelic footballer
- Mark Synnott, American rock climber and author
- Noel Synnott (born 1951), Irish football player
- Peter Synnott (1903–????), Irish Gaelic footballer
- Stephen P. Synnott (born 1946), American astronomer and Voyager scientist
- William R. Synnott (1929–2010), American organizational theorist

== See also ==
- Sinnott
- Synnot
