= Thomas Osborne (Australian journalist) =

Australian journalist and politician

Thomas Hamilton Osborne (c.1806 – 28 May 1853) was a journalist and politician in colonial Victoria (Australia).

Osborne studied Natural Philosophy, Belfast. Mercer was elected to the district of Belfast and Warrnambool in the inaugural Victorian Legislative Council in October 1851.

Osborne resigned from the Council in December 1852. He was editor and proprietor of the Belfast Gazette.

Victorian Legislative Council
New creation	Member for Belfast and Warrnambool; November 1851 – December 1852	Succeeded by Lauchlan Mackinnon
