= Lauchlan Mackinnon =

Australian politician

4th Mayor of Hawthorn
- In office 1864–1865
- Preceded by: William Henry Pettett
- Succeeded by: John de la Roche Bragge

Member of the New South Wales Legislative Council for Port Phillip
- In office 1 September 1848 – 31 May 1850
- Preceded by: Charles Ebden
- Succeeded by: Charles Ebden

Member of the Victorian Legislative Council for Belfast & Warrnambool
- In office December 1852 – May 1853
- Preceded by: Thomas Osborne
- Succeeded by: Frederick Stevens

Personal details
- Born: 26 February 1817 Kilbride, Isle of Skye, Scotland
- Died: 21 March 1888 (aged 71) Torquay, Devon, England

Lauchlan Mackinnon (26 February 1817 – 21 March 1888) was a pastoralist, politician and newspaper proprietor in colonial Australia. Mackinnon one of the most enterprising of the pioneer colonists of Victoria (Australia) and one of the proprietors of the Melbourne Argus from 1852 until his death.

== Early life ==
Mackinnon was born in Kilbride, Isle of Skye, Scotland, the second son of John Mackinnon, a Presbyterian minister of Strath, Skye, and his wife Ann, daughter of Lauchlan Mackinnon of Corriechatachan, Skye. After being educated partly at home and subsequently at Broadford, Mackinnon entered the office of his uncle Mr. Lauchlan Mackinnon, a Writer to the Signet in Glasgow; but preferring a more active life, he in 1838 proceeded to Sydney.

== Career ==
In Australia Mackinnon at once engaged in the hazardous business of "overlanding", and succeeded in his dangerous mission of conveying stock from Sydney to Adelaide—a feat which attracted much attention at the time, as it was the first overland journey made between these distant points. A little later (in 1840) he made one of the earliest overland journeys with sheep from Sydney to Melbourne. The pastoral capabilities of the country attracted his attention, and he determined to settle in Australia Felix. He took up a run in the western district on the Loddon River, and subsequently removed to Mount Fyans. He was for some years associated in business with the late James Montgomery, and in 1852 he joined Edward Wilson, and became one of the proprietors of the Argus. Prior to this he had taken a prominent part in political life, particularly interesting himself in the agitation for the separation of Port Phillip District from New South Wales. He was one of the representatives for the Electoral district of Port Phillip in the Parliament of New South Wales in 1848, and vigorously supported its claims for justice from the governing authorities of New South Wales. He was a strong and earnest supporter of the anti-convict movement, and took a prominent part in the demonstration which was held in Melbourne in 1849, when the inhabitants resolved to oppose the landing of convicts from the ship Randolph by physical force, and to undergo any extremity of suffering rather than permit the colony to become a receptacle of felons.

After separation had been secured, Mackinnon represented the Belfast and Warrnambool district in the old unicameral Victorian Legislative Council, and assisted to pass a measure intended to prevent the introduction of convicted offenders into the colony. He energetically combated the efforts of the imperial authorities to prevent the effective administration of the enactment; and on the popular opposition proving successful he proceeded in 1853 with William Westgarth to Tasmania to assist the anti-transportation party in the colony. Indeed, he took a strong interest in all the public movements of the day; and his vigour and courage were so well recognised that, in the early days when bushrangers were prevalent, he had been offered the command of the police force of Port Phillip—a position which, however, he did not accept. He was one of the members of the original Council of the University of Melbourne, and first Chairman of its Building Committee. In 1864 he was nominated to serve on the Hawthorn Council, and elected as the Mayor. When the gold discoveries in Victoria gave such a wonderful impetus to the colony, the vigorous judgment and business ability of Mackinnon, with the brilliant literary qualities of his partner, Edward Wilson, placed the Argus in the van of the Australian press.

After some years of arduous work, Mackinnon retired in 1919 and returned to England, where he settled in Crediton, Devon.

== Life ==
He was twice married, his first wife being a daughter of Robert Montgomery, and sister of James Montgomery; and his second, Emily, daughter of Capt. Bundoch, R.N.

Mackinnon died in Torquay, Devon, England on 21 March 1888.

== Lauchlan Charles Mackinnon (1848–1925; cousin) ==
Separate to Lauchlan Mackinnon (1817–1888) is his cousin, (later Sir) Lauchlan Charles Mackinnon, who was born at Corry on the Isle of Skye, Scotland in 1848. Emigrating to Australia in 1870, he similarly became the part-proprietor of the Argus (1888–1919) and Australasian. In 1876 he married Emily Grace, and had one son and two daughters. His son was also (military captain) Lauchlan Mackinnon who served on the council of the Argus and Australasian. Lauchlan Charles Mackinnon received a knighthood in 1916, dying at Downes, Crediton, Devonshire, c. 3 December 1925.

New South Wales Legislative Council
Preceded by Charles Ebden; Maurice O'Connell; Charles Nicholson; John Foster; John Airey	Member for Port Phillip; 1848–1850; Served alongside: J. Dickson, J. Williamson / W. Macarthur, J. Palmer / J. Foster / W. Mercer, E. Curr / H. Moor	Succeeded by Charles Ebden
Victorian Legislative Council
Preceded by Thomas Osborne	Member for Belfast and Warrnambool; December 1852 – May 1853	Succeeded by Frederick Stevens
