= Monckton Synnot =

Australian squatter in Victoria (1827–1879)

Monckton Synnot (1827–1879) was a squatter in Victoria, Australia, the sixth son of Captain Walter Synnot and his second wife Elizabeth, née Houston, and the grandson of Sir Walter Synnot, of Ballymoyer, County Armagh.

== Life ==
Born at the family seat of Ballymoyer, Synnot settled in the colonies in 1836 with his father Captain Walter Synnot and brothers. A year later two elder sons crossed to Port Phillip, followed in 1838 by the next two, Albert and the 12-year-old Monckton. They brought sheep with them and became pioneer landholders at Little River near Geelong, where they remained in various partnerships for about ten years.

By 1852 they had scattered and Monckton, after a brief sortie with Albert to the Californian and Victorian goldfields, was the only one left in the Little River district, as sole owner of the 26,500-acre (10,724 ha) Mowyong, later called Bareacres. In 1852 he assisted in the rescue of the survivors of the flood at the Wedge’s Werribee Station and rescued the granddaughter Annie Emily Lawrence (daughter of Robert William Lawrence and Anne Wedge). On 25 February 1853 at St Kilda, Melbourne, he married Annie Emily Lawrence. He later bought the South Brighton sheep station in the Wimmera where, in 1862, he was a member of the first Horsham District Roads Board, and a councillor in 1862-63.

The prize-winning superfine merino wools of the Western District had been extolled by the Thomas Shaws, C. H. MacKnight, J. L. Currie and others, but in the mid-1860s Synnot's letters to the papers queried their real value and gave rise to a drawn-out and sometimes bitter battle of words. Selling South Brighton in 1868, he bought the large Terrick Terrick station near the Murray River, and for a few years had some share with his brothers Albert, George and Nugent in Gunbar and Cowl Cowl in the Riverina. In 1873 he moved to Melbourne, living in Ballyreen, a mansion on Brighton Road, St Kilda. He bought large central city premises from the merchants and flour-millers, William Degraves & Co., and set up the Flinders Wool Warehouse in Flinders Lane: in this he followed the lead of his elder brother George who, opening in Geelong as a stock and station agent, had held one of the first auction sales of wool there in November 1858.

Synnot entered Melbourne wool-broking in prosperous and expansive times, when many firms were offering warehouse services, selling wool by auction or privately, or arranging and often financing its shipping for sale overseas. A pioneer of the wool trade with the East, he visited China, sent a consignment of woollen yarns to Hong Kong and arranged for silk and cotton weavers at Ning-Po to produce samples of woollen cloth, which were exhibited throughout Australia and New Zealand and at the Paris Exhibition of 1878. His efforts failed at first, but later that year when the first Japanese Trade Commission visited Australia his ideas bore some fruit.

Synnot died on 23 April 1879 at Elsternwick, aged 52, and was buried in St Kilda general cemetery. The eldest of his seven sons, Monckton Davey Synnot, and three of the younger ones carried on as wool-brokers. Both fathers and his son, Monckton, were tall, handsome, genial and convivial, with the Irish tendency to enjoy a brisk argument, but the senior Monckton was the only one to take any part in public affairs.

== References and further reading ==
- R. V. Billis and A. S. Kenyon, Pastoral Pioneers of Port Phillip (Melb, 1932)
- A. Henderson (ed), Australian Families, vol 1 (Melb, 1941)
- W. R. Brownhill, The History of Geelong and Corio Bay (Melb, 1955)
- A. Barnard, The Australian Wool Market, 1840-1900 (Melb, 1958)
- L. J. Blake and K. H. Lovett, Wimmera Shire Centenary (Horsham, 1962)
- Economist, 1862, 1863, 2 Feb 1866.
- Argus (Melbourne), 16 Sept 1877, 8 Jan 1878, 8 Sept 1883.
- 'Synnot, Monckton (1826 - 1879)', Australian Dictionary of Biography, Volume 6, Melbourne University Press, 1976, pp 238–239.
