= Francis Beaver =

Australian politician

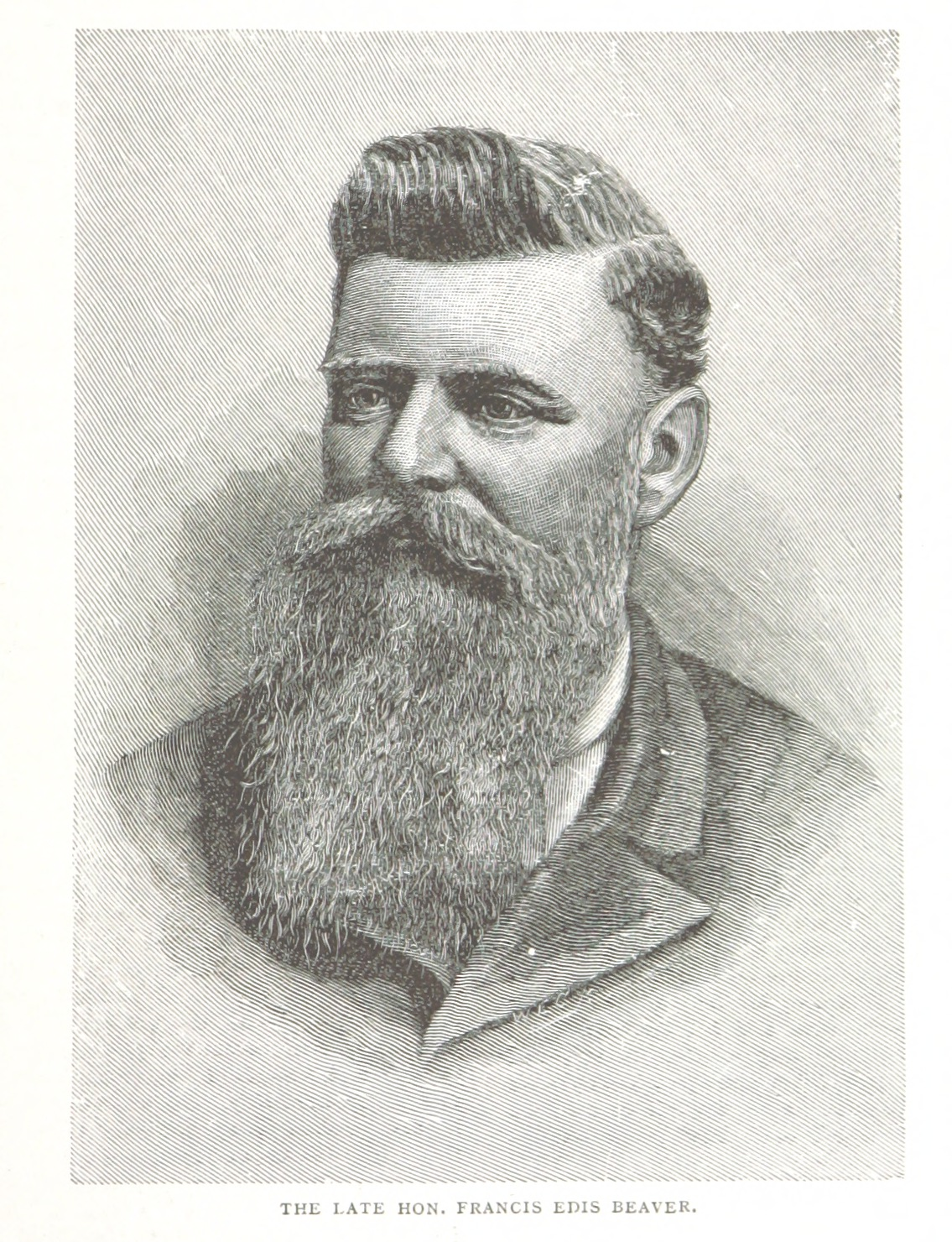
An 1888 illustration of Beaver

Francis Edis Beaver (19 June 1824 – 7 October 1887) was an auctioneer and politician in colonial Victoria, a member of the Victorian Legislative Council and the Victorian Legislative Assembly at different times.

== Early life ==
Beaver was born in Kennington, Surrey, England, the son of George Beaver and his wife Elizabeth, née Edis.

== Colonial Australia ==
Beaver arrived in Sydney in 1833 and the Port Phillip District in 1840. In March 1854, Beaver was elected to the unicameral Victorian Legislative Council for Belfast and Warrnambool. Beaver held this position until the original Council was abolished in March 1856. He then was elected to the Victorian Legislative Assembly for Belfast in November 1856, holding the seat until August 1859. Beaver was again elected the Victorian Legislative Council, now the upper house of the Victorian Parliament, this time for North Yarra Province and held the seat from December 1882 until his death in Brighton, Victoria on 7 October 1887. Beaver had married Emily Stevens in 1845.

Victorian Legislative Council
Preceded by Frederick Stevens	Member for Belfast and Warrnambool; March 1854 – March 1856; With: Mark Nicholson 1854; George Horne 1854–1856	Original Council abolished
Victorian Legislative Assembly
New district	Member for Belfast; November 1856 – August 1859	Succeeded by George Horne
Victorian Legislative Council
New district	Member for North Yarra Province; December 1882 – October 1887; With: George Meares 1882–1886; William Roberts 1886–1887; Theodotus Sumner 1882–1883; James Beaney 1883–1887	Succeeded by George Le Fevre
