= Florence MacMoyer =

Florence MacMoyer (Irish: Flaithrí Mac an Mhaoir [ˈfˠlˠahɾʲiː mˠək ə ˈwiːɾʲ]; fl. 1662 – 12 February 1713), a native of Ballymoyer, County Armagh, Ireland was the last hereditary keeper of the 9th-century Book of Armagh. MacMoyer, who gave evidence against Oliver Plunkett during his trial "for promoting the Roman faith" in the 1680s, died in 1713.

== Life ==
Florence MacMoyer was born at Ballymyre during in the 17th century and became a schoolteacher.

MacMoyer was the last hereditary keeper of the 9th-century Book of Armagh. Reputedly pawning the book for five pounds in 1680, MacMoyer used this money to travel to London to give evidence at the trial of Archbishop of Armagh, Oliver Plunkett, with his cousin, Friar John MacMoyer. Described in several sources as having engaged in perjury, he return to Ireland in 1683, with his "reputation totally discredited" and his name "universally despised".

Florence MacMoyer, who was imprisoned for some time after his return to Ireland, was unable to reclaim the Book of Armagh. He died in 1713 and was buried in Ballymoyer Old Graveyard. A headstone marking his grave, which was "treated with indignity", was later moved into Ballymoyer House.

== Book of Armagh ==
The Book of Armagh, a 9th-century Irish manuscript written mainly in Latin, is valuable for containing early texts relating to St Patrick. It contains some of the oldest surviving specimens of Old Irish and one of the earliest manuscripts produced by an insular church to contain a near complete copy of the New Testament. The book was kept by members of the MacMoyer family who had lived at Ballymacmoyer since the 14th century.

In A Compendium of Irish Biography, published by Alfred Webb in 1878, it states that:

"This precious relic was in MacMoyer's care on 29th June 1662, as appears from an entry on the reverse of the 104th leaf. MacMoyer was one of the witnesses against Archbishop Plunket in London in 1681. Previously he had pawned the volume for £5. He died, 12th February 1713, and was buried at Ballymoyer. On account of his connexion with Archbishop Plunket's death, his memory is held in the greatest abhorrence by the country people, who believed, until a recent period, that he was annually cursed by the Pope. After passing through various hands, the Book of Armagh came in 1858, by the care of the Rev. William Reeves, and the munificence of the then Lord Primate, into the Library of Trinity College, Dublin. The particulars of the life of John Moyers, given in his evidence against Archbishop Plunket, do not exactly correspond with those generally given of MacMoyer, the hereditary keeper, so that they may have been different persons, and Florence MacMoyer may have given his evidence privately".
