= Electoral district of Belfast and Warrnambool =

Former electoral district of the Victorian Legislative Council

Coordinates: 38°20′30″S 142°22′0″E

Belfast and Warrnambool Victoria—Legislative Council
- State: Victoria
- Created: 1851
- Abolished: 1856
- Namesake: Towns of Belfast and Warrnambool
- Demographic: Urbanised Rural

The Electoral district of Belfast and Warrnambool was one of the original sixteen electoral districts of the unicameral Legislative Council of the British colony of Victoria in 1851 to 1856.

The district included the towns of Belfast (renamed to Port Fairy around 1889) and Warrnambool. It was abolished when the single house was replaced in 1856 by a bicameral system consisting of the Victorian Legislative Assembly (lower house) and Victorian Legislative Council (upper house, consisting of Provinces).

== Members ==
One member initially, two from the expansion of the Council in 1853.

Member 1	Term		
Thomas Osborne	Nov 1851 – Dec 1852^{[r]}		
Lauchlan Mackinnon	Dec 1852^{[b]} – May 1853	Member 2	Term
Frederick Stevens	Jun 1853^{[b]} – Feb 1854	Mark Nicholson	Aug 1853 – May 1854
Francis Beaver	Mar 1854^{[b]} – Mar 1856	George Horne	Sep 1854^{[b]} – Mar 1856

== See also ==
- Parliaments of the Australian states and territories
- List of members of the Victorian Legislative Council

== Notes ==
^{r} = resigned
^{b} = by-election

Beaver went on to represent the Electoral district of Belfast in the Victorian Legislative Assembly from November 1856.

Horne went on to represent the Electoral district of Warrnambool in the Victorian Legislative Assembly from November 1856.
