= Frederick Stevens (Australian politician) =

Australian politician

Frederick Perkins Stevens (1820 – 17 May 1888) was a merchant and politician in colonial Victoria, a member of the Victorian Legislative Council.

== Early life ==
Stevens was born in Hobart Town, Van Diemen's Land (now Tasmania), the son of Sylvester Stamford Stephen and Bridget, née Edwards.

== Colonial Australia ==
Stevens arrived in the Port Phillip District around 1837. On 31 May 1853 Stevens was elected to the unicameral Victorian Legislative Council for Belfast and Warrnambool. Stevens held this position until resigning in May 1854.

Stevens died in Deniliquin, New South Wales on 17 May 1888, he married twice.

Victorian Legislative Council
Preceded by Lauchlan Mackinnon	Member for Belfast and Warrnambool; May 1853 – February 1854; With: Mark Nicholson	Succeeded by Francis Beaver
