= Mark Nicholson (politician, born 1818) =

Australian politician

- Born: Cliffton, Gloucestershire, England
- Died: 27 October 1889 (aged 70–71)
- Family: Elizabeth Cobham

Mark Nicholson (1818 – 27 October 1889) was a pastoralist and politician in colonial Victoria, a member of the Victorian Legislative Council.

== Biography ==
Nicholson was born in Clifton, Gloucestershire, England, the youngest son of Rev. Mark Nicholson and his wife Lucy, née Elcock. He had five sons and two daughters with his cousin with whom he married, Elizabeth Cobham. This was a political move, as Cobham's mother was sister-in-law to Georgiana McCrae, G. W. Cole, and Dr. D. J. Thomas. This allowed Nicholson to become better connected with other people of power and influence during the early years when the Port Phillip District was just forming.

In 1848 Superintendent La Trobe requested Nicholson, in an arrangement that would be shared with Thomas Manifold and Henry Foster, to become justices of the peace. Warrnambool was relatively young and thus needed those who had more influence in the Magistrates' Court at Belfast (Port Fairy). Furthermore, a bishop named knew Foster and Nicholson to be prominent churchmen. As such, they were requested to conduct services in the township until Dr. Beamish became the incumbent in 1850. In 1853, Nicholson was elected to represent Belfast and Warrnambool in the Victorian Legislative Council, without his knowing. The nomination was likely filed out of familiarity, as Nicholson had family connections; G. W. Cole, J. Graham, and W. C. Haines were fellow members in the council. He successfully moved for a survey of the ports of Belfast and Warrnambool. He was also responsible for the motion to provide funds in 1854 for a museum of natural history, now the National Museum of Victoria. He resigned in 1854 in order to return to England to educate his children.

== Colonial Australia ==
Nicholson arrived in the Port Phillip District in June 1840 aboard the Duchess of Kent. Superintendent Charles La Trobe asked Nicholson, Thomas Manifold and Henry Foster to become justices of the peace in Warrnambool in 1848. On 7 June 1853 Nicholson was elected to the unicameral Victorian Legislative Council for Belfast and Warrnambool. Nicholson held this position until May 1854.

Nicholson died in Warrnambool on 27 October 1889, he married his cousin, Elizabeth Harvie Cobham in 1845.

Victorian Legislative Council
New seat	Member for Belfast and Warrnambool; June 1853 – May 1854; With: Frederick Stevens 1853–1854; Francis Beaver 1854	Succeeded by George Horne
