= David Synnot =

Confederate Ireland officer (1593–1649)

- Born: 1593; Rahine, County Wexford
- Died: 11 October 1649 (aged 55–56); Wexford, Ireland
- Relatives: Sir Walter Synnot
- Military career
- Allegiance: Confederate Ireland
- Rank: Colonel
- Unit: Preston's Regiment
- Commands: Governor of Wexford 1649
- Conflicts: Cromwellian War in Ireland; Wexford

Colonel David Synnot (1593–1649), also spelt Sinnot, was an Anglo-Irish soldier from County Wexford, who was Governor of Wexford for Confederate Ireland when it was captured by Oliver Cromwell in 1649.

As commander of the town, Synnot was negotiating with Cromwell, when his subordinate surrendered the castle without his knowledge, allowing Parliamentarian troops to break in. In the sack that followed, an estimated 2,000 members of the garrison and townspeople died; over 300 were drowned trying to escape over the River Slaney, including Synnot.

His family's estates were confiscated; his surviving son became a Protestant, and settled in Ballymoyer, Armagh. His descendants included Sir Walter Synnot (1742-1821), a linen merchant who became a substantial landowner; Ballymoyer House was demolished in 1919, but the estate is owned by the National Trust.

== Sources ==
- Burke, Bernard (1854). The General Armory of England, Scotland, Ireland, and Wales, Volume III (2018 ed.). Forgotten Books. ISBN 978-0265951224.
- Hore, Phillip (1910). Pedigrees of Keating, Furlong, Synnott and Kavanagh (1913 ed.). Self-Published MSS.
