= The Fews =

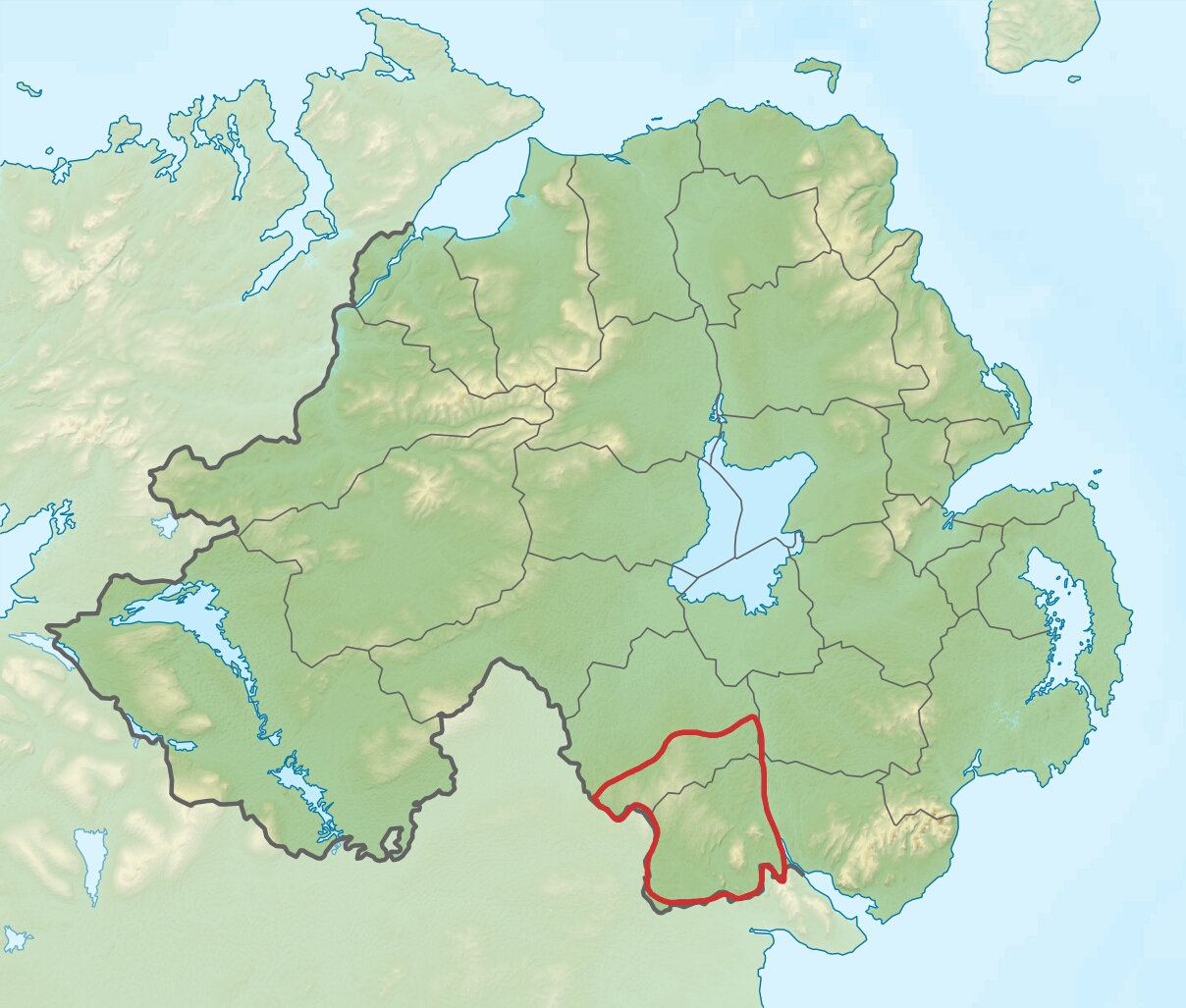
The Fews outlined on a map of Northern Ireland

The Fews (from Irish na Feá/Feadha, meaning 'the woods') is a former Irish barony in County Armagh, modern-day Northern Ireland, based on the territory of the O'Neills of the Fews. It was at a later period divided into the baronies of Fews Lower and Fews Upper.

Sometimes known as the "Highlands of South Armagh", it was originally populated by Irish Gaelic families clans. It was then colonised, mostly by Scots Clans with names such as McClelland, Sterritt, Morrow, Hamilton and Atkinson during the Plantation of Ulster. There were only a few safe and guarded passes for the colonists through these hills, such as Jerrettspass and Poyntzpass, both named due to their historic role as passes through the hills and bogland.
