= Robert William Lawrence =

Australian botanist of the 19th century

Robert William Lawrence (1807–1833), first-born son of William Effingham Lawrence, was born and educated in England. In 1825 he arrived in Van Diemen’s Land (Tasmania) (per the Elizabeth). He became acquainted with Sir William Jackson Hooker, the Regius Professor of Botany at the University of Glasgow and later director of the Botanical Gardens at Kew in London, from whose friendship he developed a passion as an amateur botanist, sending many specimens from the Colony to Kew, resulting in Hooker’s "Flora Tasmaniae" in 1860. Lawrence was Tasmania’s first botanist, and introduced Ronald Campbell Gunn to Hooker. The native fuchsia mountain correa was named by Hooker Correa lawrenciana in honour of his young protégé.

Lawrence lived in a house "Vermont" which was built for him by his father near Launceston, later moving to his father’s estate "Formosa" as overseer. In 1832 he married Anne Wedge (1808-1833) but she died the following year giving birth to their daughter Annie Emily Lawrence. Lawrence died weeks later. Gunn wrote to Hooker: "It is with feelings of the deepest regret I have to communicate to you the death of our mutual friend Mr W. R. Lawrence. This melancholy event took place at Formosa on the night of 18 October last, the day on which he attained his 26th year, and the first anniversary day of his marriage. Twelve months ago poor Lawrence married a young and most amiable Lady, with whom he lived in the most happy state it is possible for mortals to enjoy in this world, and on 2 September last I left them, after a short visit both in the enjoyment of excellent health; next day Mrs Lawrence was safely delivered of a daughter, but from delicacy of constitution, or too sudden an exposure after her confinement, she was in a few days seized with a fever which terminated fatally within a month, - fatally to Lawrence’s happiness and peace".

Lawrence died of an apoplectic fit a few weeks later, the coronial jury delivered a verdict of 'died by a visitation of God'. The infant daughter, Annie Emily Lawrence, was raised by her maternal grandparents in Van Diemens Land and later Port Phillip, where she married Monckton Synnot.
