= William Effingham Lawrence =

William Effingham Lawrence (1781–1841) was an English colonist to Australia, the son of Captain Effingham Lawrence, a merchant with houses in London, Liverpool and New York City. Previous generations of Lawrences had settled in the American colonies but returned to England after the War of Independence. Lawrence was an educated and refined man, an intimate of Jeremy Bentham, who was obliged to migrate to the colony of Van Diemen’s Land due to poor health. On his leaving England Bentham wrote to a friend in Rio de Janeiro: ‘Our excellent friend on his way to Australia is not without thoughts of touching at Rio de Janeiro: a worthier man, a more benevolent cosmopolite, never left any country; and very few better informed or more intelligent’.

He purchased a small cutter, the Lord Liverpool and sailed via South America in 1822. On the way he sailed into Rio de Janeiro for provisions and water. Brazil, a Portuguese colony since the 16th century, was in the midst of a struggle for independence, and Lawrence became personally involved through his friendship with José Bonifácio, the liberal revolutionary and first minister under the new government of Dom Pedro, who had defied his father in Lisbon and declared Brazil independent in 1822. Lawrence was captivated by events and remained for months in the country, becoming a confidant of José Bonifácio, the architect of Brazilian independence. Bonifácio wanted Lawrence to remain in the country permanently, but Lawrence declined, and after several exciting months, sailed on for Van Diemen’s Land.

Lawrence arrived in 1823 and, by order of the Colonial Office was ordered a grant of 4,000 acres (16 km²) with his brother, with a reserve after 5 years of a further 4,000 acres (16 km²). These 8,000 acres (32 km²) of land became the subject of controversy, because the grant was to be exclusive of waste land. In the end, due to the mismanagement of the surveyor general, the grant ended up being some 12,000 acres (49 km²). The colony was small and gossip, jealousy and petty rivalry was rife. When Colonel George Arthur arrived he was informed of the size of the grant, and ordered an inquiry, sending John Helder Wedge to survey the grant.

Wedge and Lawrence became friends and Wedge’s niece Anne Wedge married Lawrence’s son Robert William Lawrence in 1832.

Lawrence’s pastoral interests continued throughout the next 20 years and he eventually became one of the largest landowners in the colony. Lawrence was also prominent in the field of education, helping establish a school in the Norfolk Plains, which was not a success. He then formed a committee with Henty and Mulgrave for the formation of a Church of England school in Launceston, but died before the foundation of Launceston Church of England Grammar School.

Under Governor Sir John Franklin Lawrence was appointed to the Legislative Council and retained his seat until his death in 1841. Of his sons Robert William Lawrence died young in 1833, and the others remained in the colonies, except for Edward Effingham Lawrence, who returned to England to be educated and became a Cornet in the 7th Dragoon Guards in 1856 and taking part in the Austro-Sardinian War (1860–61).
