= Peter Manifold =

English pastoralist and politician in Australia (1817–1885)

Peter Manifold (1817–1885) was an English pastoralist and politician of western Victoria.

== Early life ==
Born in 1817 to William and Mary Manifold in Bromborough, Cheshire, England.

Emigrated to Tasmania.

== Pastoral activities ==
He arrived in Geelong in Victoria from Tasmania in July 1836 after his brother Thomas was the first to land sheep at Point Henry in February 1836.

Peter Manifold and his brothers took up a sheep run around Batesford, occupying land both side of the Moorabool River. But after a few years looked to Victoria's western district for pasture.

The Purrumbete property consisted of 100,000 acres, taking in the areas of Camperdown and Mount Leura. The Manifold Brothers (Thomas, John and Peter) bred sheep, cattle and horses. During the nineteenth century they were among the largest landholders in Victoria.

In 1857-60 the Purrembeet homestead was constructed.

=== Conflict with Aboriginals ===
Conflict between the Manifold brothers and the Djargurd Wurrung people occurred.

The ancestral home, that was initially chosen for its defensive position against the aboriginals, was located on the banks of Lake Purrumbete. The first slab-hut was built around 1.2 kilometers from the present site. It was later abandoned, however, due to conflicts with the aboriginals, whom they previously had many adventures with.

In 1840, Peter Manifold along with another pastoral squatter Arthur Lloyd presented to the Geelong police magistrate the following signed deposition of aboriginal sheep stealing and subsequent shootings.

On 12 September 1840, Mr Arthur Lloyd reported that upon his absence on 21 August 1840, 100 of his sheep were driven away from his station by the natives. At the time, Peter Manifold's also had 84 of his sheep driven away. Together, Peter Manifold, his brother, and Arthur Lloyd, traced down the natives and rescued 56 of Peter Manifold's sheep. Upon confrontation, there were approximately 40 to 50 natives who presented their spears and showed signs of hostility, at which Peter Manifold, his brother, and Arthur Lloyd open-fired.

== Later life ==
Peter Manifold became a member of the Hampden and Heytesbury Road Board in 1859.

He was then elected a member of the Hampdenshire Council and remained a member until 1866.

== Personal life ==
Peter Manifold was unmarried.

== Death ==
Peter Manifold died aged 68, on 31 July 1885 after several months of ill health.
