= Thomas Manifold =

Australian politician (1809–1875)

Member of the Victorian Legislative Assembly for Warrnambool
- In office 4 March 1861 – November 1861
- Preceded by: George Horne
- Succeeded by: John Wood

Personal details
- Born: 29 March 1809 Bromborough, England
- Died: 7 November 1875 (aged 66) Caulfield, Colony of Victoria
- Relations: Peter Manifold (brother); Walter Manifold (son)

Thomas Manifold (29 March 1809 – 7 November 1875) was an English-born Australian grazier and politician, who served as a member of the Victorian Legislative Assembly.

== Biography ==
Manifold was born on 29 March 1809 in Bromborough, England. He was the son of William Manifold and Mary Manifold (née Barnes). He had seven siblings, including brothers Peter and John.

He arrived in Hobart on 23 January 1828 aboard the Greenock. The rest of the family followed later. In 1836, the three brothers established a sheep station in Port Phillip District.

On 4 July 1836, he married Jane Elizabeth Synnot, daughter of Walter Synnot. She later took their two daughters and two sons to live in Europe and have an education there. Thomas followed a year later, before the family returned to live in Melbourne.

He was elected to represent the Electoral district of Warrnambool in the Victorian Legislative Assembly on 4 March 1861 at a by-election following the resignation of George Horne. He won re-election at the 1861 Victorian colonial election in August, before resigning in November.

Manifold died on 7 November 1875 in Caulfield, aged 66.

Three of his relatives have been involved in Australian politics. His son Sir Walter Manifold was a member of the Victorian Legislative Council from 1901 to 1924. His grandson, Sir Chester Manifold, was a member of the Legislative Assembly from 1929 to 1935 and served in both World Wars. His nephew Chester Manifold was a member of the Australian House of Representatives from 1901 to 1903 and 1913 to 1918.
