= Lillian Sinnott =

Stage actress

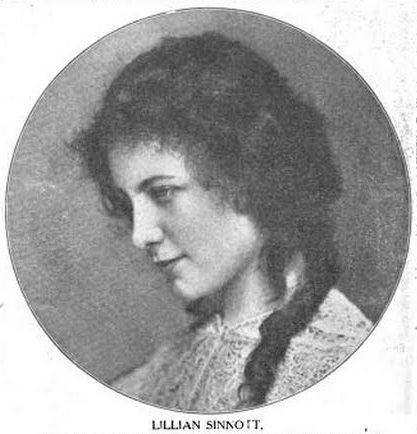
- Lillian Sinnott, from a 1909 publication.
- Born: 1890
- Died: January 5, 1914 (aged 24); New York City, New York
- Occupation: Stage actress

Lillian Sinnott (1890 – January 5, 1914) was an American stage actress.

== Biography ==
=== Career ===
Sinnott was well known in Indianapolis, Indiana because of her association with the Murat Theater summer stock companies. She was first seen in support of Louis Mann in The Man Who Stood Still, at English's Theater in Indianapolis. This was in December 1909 and again in April 1910. She returned to the city again and joined the Murat players in ingénue parts during the summer of 1911. She received praise for her role as Mary Jane in Mary Jane's Pa. Jane Wheatley played her mother. The following December there was an attempt to form a stock company at the Colonial Theater in Indianapolis. Sinnott was engaged as the leading woman in The Chorus Lady, The Virginian, and Arsene Lupin.

Sinnott performed in a number of productions of David Belasco in New York. Among these was an adaptation of Lovers' Lane by Clyde Fitch which also featured Paul McAllister. The location was Proctor's Theater at 125th Street and Lexington Avenue. The play was staged in October 1903.

=== Death ===
On January 5, 1914, Sinnott committed suicide in her mother's home in New York City by slashing her throat and both wrists with a razor following the death of English actor Leslie Kenyon. Kenyon had suffered a stroke the previous day and died a short time later. Sinnott was 24 years old at the time and hoped to marry Kenyon, after he divorced his wife.
