= Sack of Wexford =

Part of the Cromwellian conquest of Ireland

Coordinates: 52.3342°N 6.4575°W

Siege of Wexford
- Part of the Cromwellian conquest of Ireland
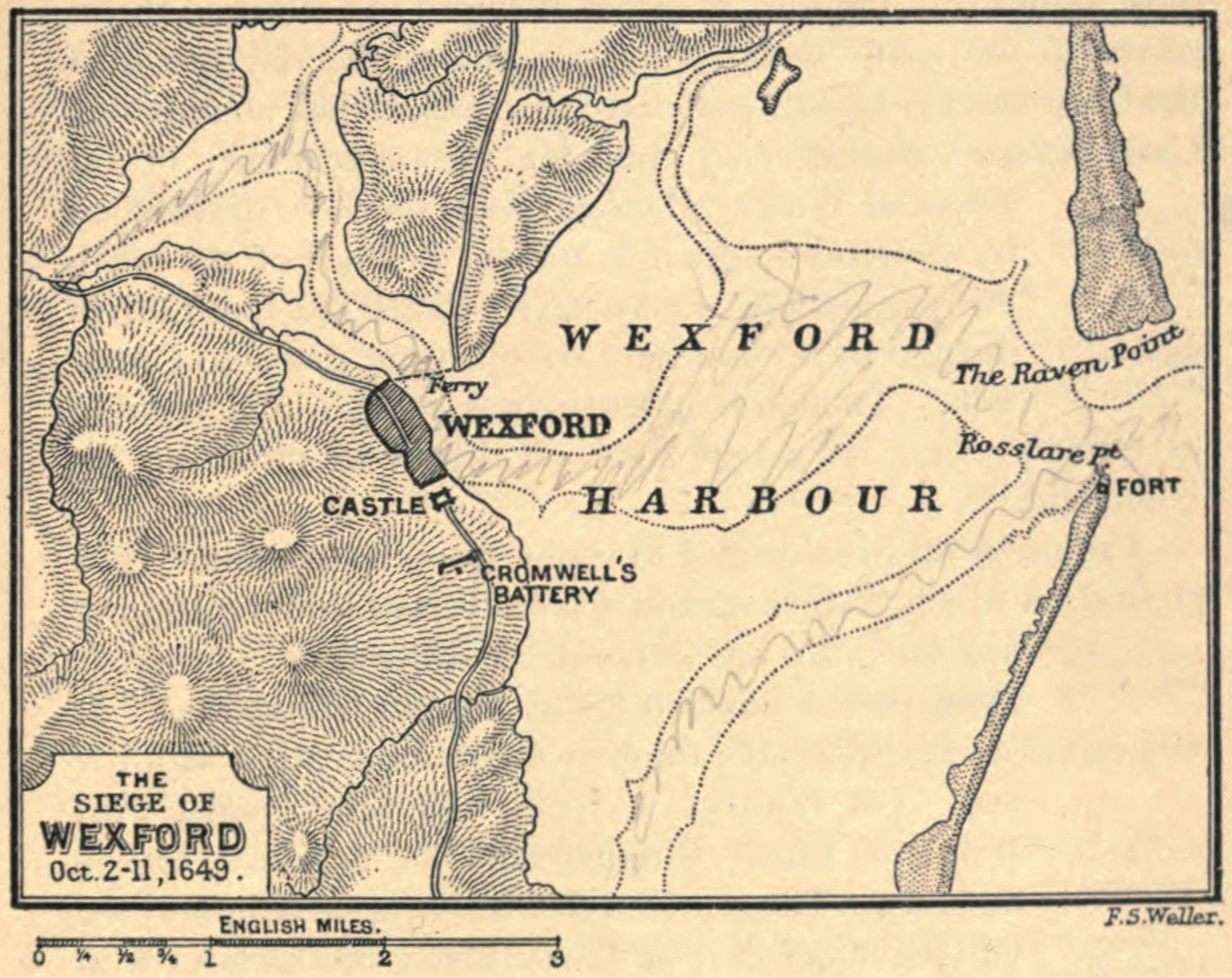
- Map of the siege of Wexford, 2-11 October 1649 (F. S. Weller, 1886)
Date	2 October to 11 October 1649
Location	Wexford, Ireland
Result	Commonwealth victory

Belligerents
English Commonwealth	Irish Confederates; Royalists

Commanders and leaders
Oliver Cromwell; Henry Ireton; Michael Jones; Richard Deane	David Synnot †; James Stafford; Edward Butler

Strength
c. 6,000	3,500 – 4,000

Casualties and losses
c. 20 killed Unknown wounded, or died of disease	1,500 – 2,000 killed (including civilians); 3,000 captured

The Sack of Wexford took place from 2 to 11 October 1649, during the Cromwellian conquest of Ireland, part of the 1641–1653 Irish Confederate Wars. English Commonwealth forces under Oliver Cromwell stormed the town after negotiations broke down, killing most of the Irish Confederate and Royalist garrison. Many civilians also died, either during the sack, or drowned attempting to escape across the River Slaney.

== Background ==
On 17 January 1649, the Catholic Confederation signed a treaty with the Duke of Ormond, Royalist leader in Ireland. (Note: 'Royalist' forces contained Irish Protestant members of the Church of Ireland, a small number of Irish Catholics like Clanricarde whose loyalty to the Crown superseded religion, and English exiles, mainly Protestant, but including Catholics like Arthur Aston.) Following the Execution of Charles I on 30 January, they were joined by Ulster Protestants who objected to his killing, and replacement of the monarchy by the Commonwealth of England. (Note: Many Ulster Protestants were Calvinist Scots immigrants, who viewed monarchy as divinely ordained; while they had little liking for Charles the man, the execution of a king was considered sacrilegious) However, their defection caused a split with Ulster Catholic Eoghan Ó Néill, whose troops were some of the most effective in the Confederate army, and who now made a separate truce with Michael Jones, Commonwealth governor of Dublin.

Seeking to secure Ireland as a base for the new king, Charles II, Ormond besieged Dublin in June, but was weakened by having to divert resources against Ó Néill. On 2 August, Jones defeated him at Rathmines, a victory that allowed 12,000 mostly veteran New Model Army troops under Oliver Cromwell to land near Dublin unimpeded. At a Council of War held at Drogheda on 27 August, Ormond and his commanders agreed to avoid open battle, but instead strongly hold key ports along the east coast. The garrisons were ordered to delay their opponents as long as possible, relying on hunger and disease to weaken them as winter approached.

Cromwell's 1649 campaign; key locations

This policy, while reasonable in itself, failed to take into account the large, modern, artillery train that accompanied Cromwell. These guns were too powerful for Drogheda's fortifications, which was besieged on 3 September, and the walls quickly breached. When surrender negotiations broke down, the town was stormed on 11 September, and many of the garrison of 2,600 were killed. Despite being within the then-accepted rules of war, (Note: If a town refused to surrender when a "practical breach" was made in the fortifications, it was subject to being plundered by the besiegers, and the garrison took their chances. However, executing them in such numbers was highly unusual) this act was unprecedented for the Wars of the Three Kingdoms, and Cromwell later admitted it was intended to deter future resistance.

Cromwell returned to Dublin, while Ormond retreated to the Confederate capital, Kilkenny. Sending a detachment against Ó Néill, who was negotiating a return to the Confederacy, Cromwell and his main force advanced on Wexford. This port was an important base for Confederate privateer attacks on English merchant ships, and provided a link with the exiled Royalist court in France. His army moved far quicker than Ormond anticipated since their supplies and siege artillery were transported by a naval squadron under Richard Deane.

Ormond despatched 1,000 men under David Synnot to garrison Wexford, with his field army based at New Ross to protect its supply lines. Cromwell's force of around 6,000 arrived outside the town on 2 October; two days later, a detachment led by Jones surprised the Royalist garrison of nearby Rosslare, giving Deane a secure harbour.

== Siege ==
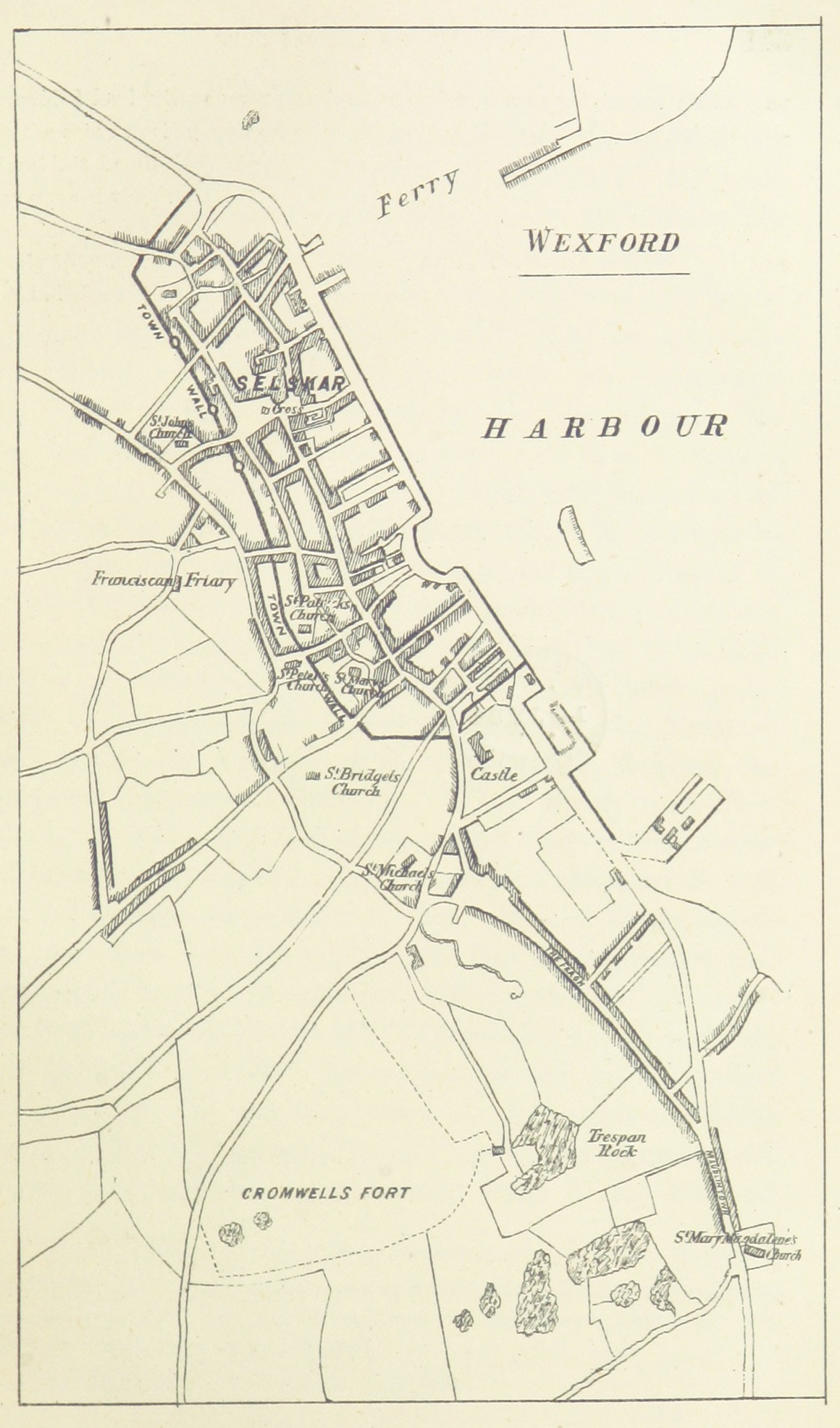
Map of 17th-century Wexford, showing Cromwell's camp to the southwest

On arrival, Cromwell offered the garrison terms, which allowed them to leave without their weapons, and guaranteed the town would remain unharmed. Although acceptable to the civilian leadership, they were rejected by Synnot, who sought to delay as agreed at Drogheda. The rains had started, and many of the besiegers were already suffering from dysentery.

While waiting for Deane to land his artillery, Cromwell continued to negotiate with Synnott, who was reinforced by 1,500 men from Viscount Iveagh's regiment on 5 October. (Note: Arthur Magennis, 3rd Viscount Iveagh, (1623-1684), had formerly served with Ó Néill's Ulster Catholic army, but remained loyal to Ormond, and was one of the last to surrender in 1653.) Ormond had planned to relieve Wexford himself, but was diverted to Youghal when its Protestant Royalist garrison defected. However, he sent Synnott another 600 men, led by Colonel Edward Butler.

The guns opened fire early on 11 October, concentrating on the castle, which was held by a separate garrison, under Governor James Stafford. (Note: The Staffords were a large and important family in County Wexford; a Captain Nicholas Stafford was elected MP for Fethard in the 1689 Jacobite Parliament.) Synnot now accepted the original terms, but when his delegation met with Cromwell, they made new demands. These included guarantees of religious freedom, with the garrison retaining their weapons, and the privateers currently in harbour allowed to leave with their goods and ships intact. Cromwell deemed them unacceptable and now lost patience. (Note: His final letter to Sinnott on 11 October 1649 reads as follows; "Sir, I have had the patience to peruse your propositions; to which I might have returned an answer with some disdain. But to be short I shall give the soldiers and non-commissioned officers quarter for life and leave to go to their several habitations......and as for the inhabitants, I shall engage myself that no violence shall be offered to their goods, and that I shall protect their town from plunder.")

The artillery breached the castle walls in two places, and Stafford surrendered when Cromwell's infantry began forming for an assault. He failed to inform Synnot and Butler, who were taken by surprise, allowing Commonwealth troops from the castle to break into the town. In the sack that followed, between 1,500 and 2,000 soldiers and civilians died, over 300 of whom drowned escaping across the river. Up to another 3,000 were taken prisoner, for the loss of only 20 attackers.

In his report to London, Cromwell suggested this was retribution for the killing of Protestants earlier in the rebellion, although he regretted the damage prevented him from using Wexford for winter quarters. His personal responsibility is still a matter of debate; historians including Tom Reilly, Nicholas Canny, and Roger Hainsworth, suggest the assault was launched without his approval, and he was unable to control his troops once the plundering began.

The war in Ireland was characterised by brutality on both sides; between 2,000 and 3,000 Scots and Ulster Presbyterians died in the pursuit that followed O'Neill's victory at Benburb in June 1646. Although the killings at Drogheda and Wexford were on a larger scale, Irish Catholics captured in England and Scotland, or taken at sea, were routinely executed throughout the war, including Philiphaugh in 1645, and Dunaverty in 1647. For various reasons, attitudes had noticeably hardened since the end of the First English Civil War in 1646. Royalist officers captured in the 1648 Second English Civil War were often shot, and enlisted men transported to the West Indies.

== Aftermath ==
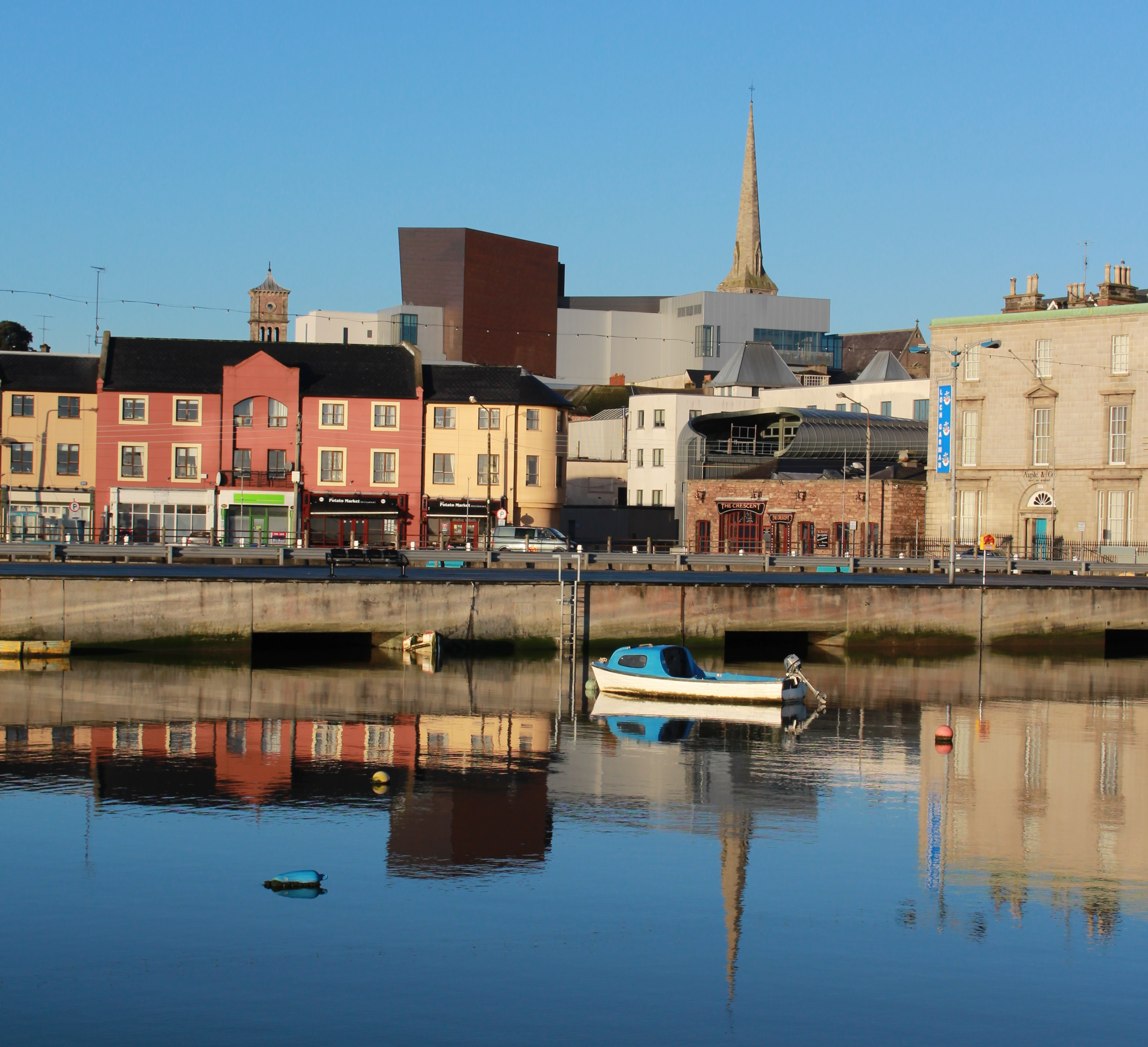
Wexford waterfront

The loss of Wexford ended any chance of Charles II landing in Ireland; the Royalist fleet, commanded by Prince Rupert, now broke out of Kinsale and headed for Lisbon. It also eliminated the use of the port by privateers; the Parliamentarians claimed to have captured over 80, plus 100 fishing boats.

Detaching so many troops to strengthen the garrison, who were then killed, captured or deserted, left Ormond fewer than 3,000 men, although this later increased to 7,000 by early November. Cromwell captured New Ross, then moved on to besiege Waterford, before being forced to retreat by sickness and lack of supplies. Between October and November, his army suffered over 1,000 deaths from disease, including senior officers such as Michael Jones and Thomas Horton.

Despite this, the 1649 campaign was far more successful than anticipated, and seriously weakened the Royalist/Confederate alliance, composed as it was of factions with little in common. Religion generally prevailed over other motivations; in October, Protestant Royalists in Cork changed sides, followed by Lord Inchiquin, and the rest of Munster. In Ulster, Ó Néill's army remained on the sidelines until negotiations with Ormond were completed on 20 October; he died two weeks later, on 6 November. At the start of September, only Derry was held by those loyal to the government in London; by mid-December, they controlled the entire province, apart from Enniskillen.

== Sources ==
- D'Alton, John (1844). Illustrations, Historical and Genealogical: Of King James's Irish Army List (1689) (2108 ed.). Franklin Classics. ISBN 978-0342516131.
- Faul, Denis (2004). "Cromwell in Ireland; the massacres". Seanchas Ardmhacha: Journal of the Armagh Diocesan Historical Society. 20 (1): 293–298. JSTOR 25746993.
- Finnegan, David (2014). "The Irish Catholic clergy, Stuart sovereignty and the 1650 appeal to the Duke of Lorraine". Revue électronique d'études sur le monde anglophone. 11 (4). doi:10.4000/erea.3734.
- Hayes-McCoy, Gerard Anthony (1989). Irish Battles: A Military History of Ireland. The Appletree Press. ISBN 978-0862812126.
- "Letters: Cromwell's negotiations with Wexford". Wexford Hub. 15 May 2015.
- Macleod, Donald (Autumn 2009). "The influence of Calvinism on politics" (PDF). Theology in Scotland. XVI (2).
- Mitchell, Neil (2004). Agents of Atrocity: Leadership, Political Violence and Human Rights. Palgrave Macmillan. ISBN 978-1403962744.
- MJ (1875). "Cromwell in Ireland. III. Expedition to Wexford". The Irish Monthly. 3: 218–228. JSTOR 20501601.
- Murphy, Elaine (2011). "Pirates in our channel; the Cromwellian navy in Ireland, 1649 to 1653". History Ireland. 19 (4). JSTOR 41231661.
- Plant, David (9 February 2008). "The Siege of Wexford, 1649". BCW Project.
- Robertson, Barry (2014). Royalists at War in Scotland and Ireland, 1638–1650. Ashgate. ISBN 978-1409457473.
- Royle, Trevor (2004). Civil War: The Wars of the Three Kingdoms 1638–1660 (2006 ed.). Abacus. ISBN 978-0-349-11564-1.

== Bibliography ==
- Fraser, Antonia (1975). Cromwell Our Chief of Men. Panther, St Albans.
- Lenihan, Padraig (2001). Confederate Catholics at War. Cork: Cork University Press. ISBN 1-85918-244-5.
- Ohlmeyer, Jane (1998). Ohlmeyer, Jane; Kenyon, John (eds.). The Civil Wars. Oxford.
- Reilly, Tom (1999). Cromwell : an honourable enemy. Brandon: Dingle. ISBN 0-86322-250-1.
- Wheeler, James Scott (1999). Cromwell in Ireland. Dublin: Gill & Macmillan. ISBN 0-7171-2884-9.
