= Walter Synnot (colonial settler) =

British settler in Tasmania

Captain Walter Synnot, a prominent Australian Colonial, was a son of Sir Walter Synnot. In 1819 he settled in Cape Colony but returned to Britain. In 1835 he then settled first in Van Diemen's Land at his property Invermay, near Launceston, Tasmania. Walter spent the rest of his life in Tasmania and died at his home, "The Mansion" in Canning Street, Launceston, in 1851. His numerous children included Julia, who married Henry Cole in Launceston, Monckton Synnot and George Synnot the well known squatters and wool brokers. His daughter Jane married Thomas Manifold.

He features in the famous 18th-century painting "The Children of Walter Synnot Esq" by Joseph Wright of Derby.

Of the more famous of his descendants are Admiral Sir Anthony Synnot RAN and Sir Walter Synnot Manifold.
