= George Horne (politician) =

Australian politician

- Born: 7 September 1811; Chiswick
- Died: 17 September 1873 (aged 62)
- Occupations: colonial politician and attorney

George Samuel Wegg Horne (7 September 1811 – 17 September 1873) was a Victorian (Australia) colonial politician and attorney.

== Biography ==
Horne was born in Chiswick, Middlesex and was admitted as an attorney in England in 1833. He practised in London until 1834, then migrated to Van Diemen's Land (now Tasmania) and was admitted to the Supreme Court of Tasmania in 1835. Horne then resided in Portland, Victoria) and then went to England 1843. He returned to Melbourne in 1844 and was admitted as an attorney there in 1845.

Horne was elected to the Victorian Legislative Council for the Belfast and Warrnambool in September 1854, a position he held until March 1856. In November 1856 Horne was elected to the Victorian Legislative Assembly for the Electoral district of Warrnambool, he resigned in February 1861. Horne also contested the seats of Kilmore in 1853 and Rodney in 1856.

From 11 March 1857 to 29 April 1857 Horne was Commissioner of Crown Lands and Survey and Surveyor General of Victoria; he was also commissioner Public Works 21 December 1858 to 27 October 1859. After politics, Horne resumed work as an attorney and practised in Melbourne as a senior partner in Horne, Parton & Hellins c.1859 to 1860. He then practised with Horne & Read c.1862.

Horne went to New Zealand around 1867 and lived in Nelson. He was elected member of the Nelson Provincial Council for the Grey electorate and served for 13 months (1868–1869).

Horne died in Nelson in 1873 and was buried at Wakapuaka Cemetery. He was married to Maria and they had several children.

Victorian Legislative Council
Preceded by Mark Nicholson	Member for Belfast and Warrnambool; September 1854 – March 1856; With: Francis Beaver	Original Council abolished
Victorian Legislative Assembly
New district	Member for Warrnambool; November 1856 – February 1861	Succeeded by Thomas Manifold
Government offices
Preceded by Andrew Clarke	Surveyor General of Victoria; 1857	Succeeded by George Christian Darbyshire
