= Thomas Foster Chuck =

19th-century British photographer who had a career in Australia

Thomas Foster Chuck (19 September 1826 – 7 December 1898) was a British photographer. He was born in London and migrated to Australia, where he documented the explorers and early colonists of Victoria.

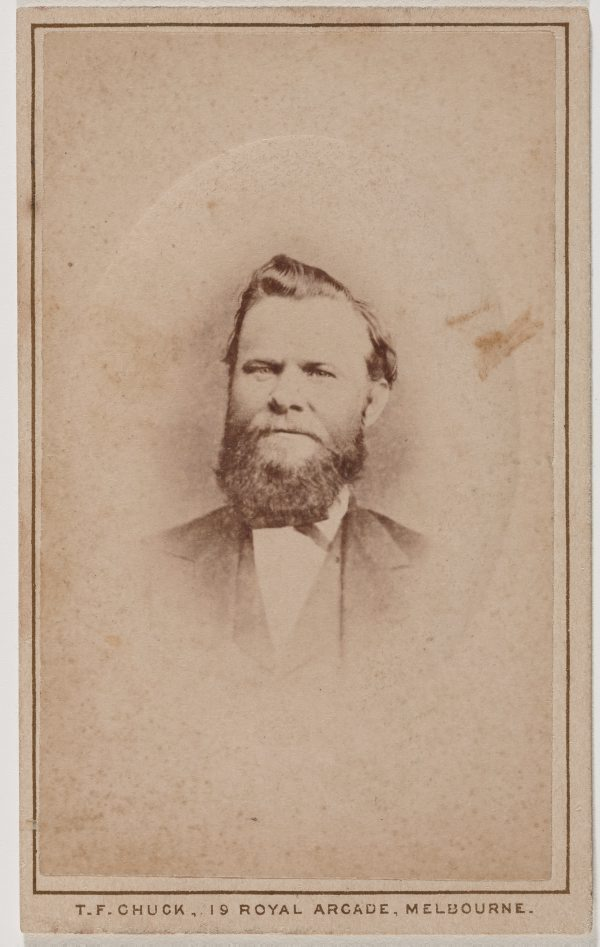
Chuck c. 1864–1876).

== Photography career ==
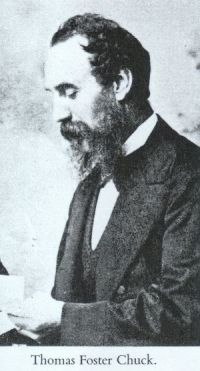
Chuck (date unknown).

He migrated to Australia. By 1866 he had established a studio in Daylesford. Later in Melbourne he occupied various studios before opening the London Portrait Gallery in the Royal Arcade on Bourke Street. In 1876 he sold the Melbourne studio and moved to Ballarat where he opened the Gallery of Art.

He documented the explorers and early colonists of Victoria such as the Burke and Wills expedition of 1860–61; and his mammoth The Explorers and Early Colonists of Victoria, a montage of over 700 photographs of early settlers of Victoria, made between 1870 and 1872. In 1872, he was awarded a contract to photograph the National Gallery of Victoria's collection, resulting in 18 photographs that were published as Photographs of the Pictures in the National Gallery of Melbourne (1875).

In 1874, a collection of Chuck's photographs including portraits of Edward Williams and Redmond Barry, won a gold medal at the Annual International Exhibition in London.

== Personal life ==
Chuck married Adeline Holt in 1854 and she died in 1867. He married Mary Ambrose in 1869.

He died in Albert Park, Victoria on 7 December 1898.

== Publications ==
- Key to the historical picture of the explorers and early colonists of Victoria. Melbourne: Mason, Firth, & McCutcheon, 1872. OCLC 222299194
- Photographs of the pictures in the National Gallery Melbourne. Melbourne: F.F. Bailliere, 1875. Edited by Marcus Clarke.
- One Story is Good Till Another is Told; or, a Reply to Mr. Anthony Trollope on That Part of His Work Entitled "Australia and New Zealand" Relating to Victoria. Liverpool: Daily Post Steam Printing Works, 1877. OCLC 1080172234.

== Collections ==
- National Library of New Zealand: 1 print
- National Portrait Gallery (Australia): 4 prints
- State Library Victoria, Melbourne, Australia
