= Fews Upper =

Fews Upper Na Feá Uachtaracha(Irish)
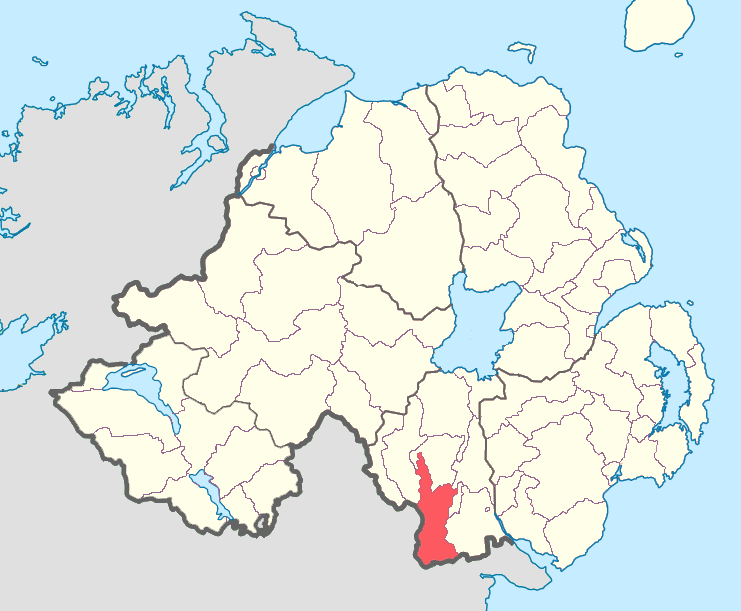
- Location of Fews Upper, County Armagh, Northern Ireland.
- Sovereign state: United Kingdom
- Country: Northern Ireland
- County: Armagh

Fews Upper (from Irish na Feá/Feadha, meaning 'the woods') is a barony in County Armagh, Northern Ireland. It lies in the south of the county bordering the Republic of Ireland with its southern and south-western borders. It is bordered by four other baronies in Northern Ireland: Armagh to the west; Fews Lower to the north and west; Orior Lower to the north-west; and Orior Upper to the east. It also borders three baronies in the Republic of Ireland: Cremorne to the west; Dundalk Upper to the south; and Farney to the south-west. Fews Lower and Upper formed the barony of The Fews until it was sub-divided.

== Geographical features ==
The Fews Mountains run through both Fews Lower and Upper, with the range's highest peak, Carrigatuke (also known as Armaghbrague Mountain), standing at 1,200 ft., located in Fews Lower. The County Water and Clarbane River both flow through Fews Upper. The Ballynacarry Bridge crosses the River Fane which is on the border between County Armagh and County Monaghan.

== List of settlements ==
Below is a list of settlements in Fews Upper:

=== Towns ===
- Crossmaglen

=== Villages and population centres ===
- Ballsmill
- Cullyhanna
- Newtownhamilton
- Silverbridge
- Whitecross

== List of civil parishes ==
Below is a list of civil parishes in Fews Upper:

- Ballymyre
- Creggan
- Lisnadill (split with the barony of Armagh and Fews Lower)
- Newtownhamilton
