= Ballymoyer =

Coordinates: 54.216°N 6.530°W

Ballymoyer: Irish: Baile an Mhaoir
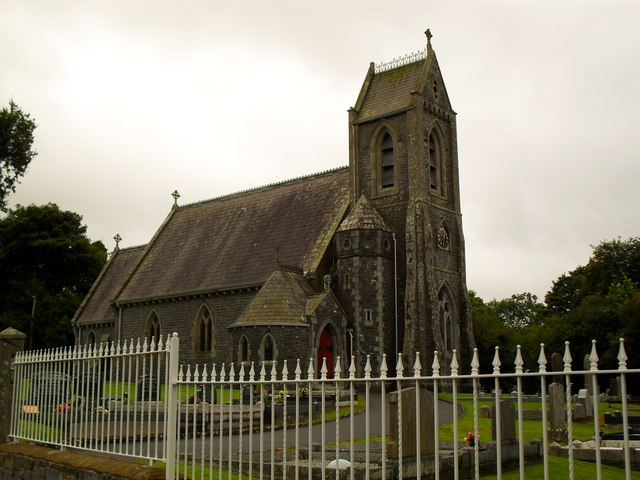
- St Luke's Church, Church of Ireland, in Ballymoyer

- Location within Northern Ireland
- County: Armagh
- Country: Northern Ireland
- Sovereign state: United Kingdom
- Post town: ARMAGH
- Postcode district: BT60
- Dialling code: 028

Ballymoyer or Ballymyre (from Irish Baile an Mhaoir, meaning 'settlement of the steward') is a civil parish in the historic barony of Fews Upper, County Armagh, Northern Ireland, 3 miles north-east of Newtownhamilton.

== History ==
Ballymoyer House was the seat of Sir Walter Synnot (1742-1821). While the house was demolished in the 1930s, some of the remaining estate lands were donated to the National Trust. This includes Ballymoyer Woodland, an area of mixed woodland which is open to the public.

The parish of Ballymoyer contains two churches dedicated to St Luke. Construction on the first church commenced in the early 17th century when the walls of St Luke's church were erected in the reign of Charles I. This structure, however, remained unroofed due to the murder of the appointed clergyman, until 1775, when Archbishop Richard Robinson commissioned it to be finished. The present Church of Ireland church of St Luke was built by the Synnot family in the 1820s. It was constructed with the help of a donation of £900 from the Board of First Fruits.

The local Catholic church, the Church of St Malachy, is within the parish of Loughgilly in the Archdiocese of Armagh.

== Civil parish of Ballymyre ==
The civil parish contains the village of Whitecross. It also contains the following eight townlands:

- Aghincurk
- Ballinatate
- Ballintemple
- Cavanakill
- Corlat
- Knockavannon
- Lurgana
- Outleckan

== Notable people ==
- Florence MacMoyer (d.1713), school master, reputed perjurer and last hereditary keeper of the Book of Armagh
- Walter Synnot (1742–1821), High Sheriff of Armagh who built Ballymoyer House.
- Arthur Henry Seton Hart-Synnot (1870–1942), British Army general born at Ballymoyer.

== See also ==
- List of civil parishes of County Armagh
