= Walter Manifold =

Australian grazier and politician (Walter Synnot Manifold; 1849–1928)

Sir Walter Synnot Manifold (30 March 1849 – 15 November 1928) was an Australian grazier and politician.

Born in Melbourne, Manifold was the son of Thomas Manifold, the pioneer grazier in the Western District, and a descendant of Sir Walter Synnot.

He was educated at Melbourne Church of England Grammar School and the University of Melbourne and in France and Germany, and qualified as a solicitor in 1875, but never practised. Instead he became a grazier, owning first Sesbania station in northern Queensland from 1876 to 1884 and then Wollaston station near Warrnambool from 1886 until it was sold for soldier settlement in 1914.

In 1885 he married Fanny Maria Smith.

He was elected to the Legislative Council of Victoria for the Western Province in 1901, and held the seat until 1924, as a non-Labor, later Nationalist, member. From 1910 until 1919 he was the unofficial leader of the Legislative Council, and in 1919 was elected president. He was knighted in the 1920 New Year Honours. He retired as president in 1923 due to ill health and in early 1924 resigned his seat. He died four years later at Toorak.
