= George Synnot =

Australian pioneer in Victoria (1819–1871)

George Synnot (23 February 1819 – 1 July 1871) was one of Victoria's pioneer settlers arriving in the Port Phillip District about 1837 and rising to become a prominent land owner and Geelong businessman.

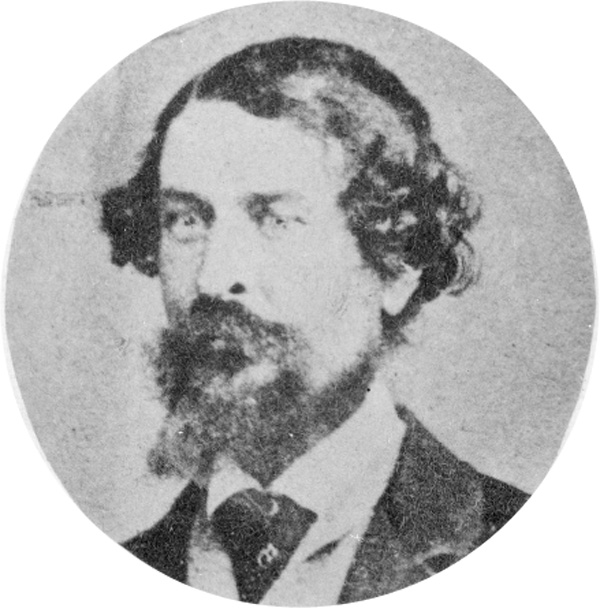
414 George Synot 1830

George Synnot was son of Captain Walter Synnot, a prominent Australian Colonial, one of numerous children. His Brother Monckton Synnot was also a well known squatter and wool brokers. His sister Jane married into the Manifold family.

George Synnot travelled to the Port Phillip District and established the stock and station agency, George Synnot & Co., in 1854, taking Thomas Guthrie (1833–1928), into the partnership in 1857. They operated hide and skin stores, wool and grain warehouses in Claire Street Geelong, and also engaged in trade. Synnot is credited with holding one of the first auction sales of wool in Geelong in November 1858. Hawkes Bros. took over the business in 1882. In 1850, Synnot purchased over 18,000 acres under pre-emptive rights in the parishes of Bulban and Wurdi Yowang. With his brother Monkton Synnot, he managed the main station known as 'Station Peak', while the Mouyong property (also known as Mowyong Mayong, Moyong, Mouyong or Bareacres).

Synnot bought the gabled Scottish manse style house 'Fernside' in Geelong at an auction in 1866.
