= List of places in County Londonderry =

This is a list of cities, towns, villages, parishes and hamlets in County Londonderry, Northern Ireland. See the list of places in Northern Ireland for places in other counties.

Towns are listed in bold.

== A ==
- Aberfoyle
- Aghadowey
- Altnagelvin
- Ardgarvan
- Ardmore
- Articlave
- Artikelly

== B ==
- Ballerin
- Ballinascreen
- Ballinderry
- Ballyhanedin
- Ballykelly
- Ballylifford
- Ballymaguigan
- Ballynagalliagh
- Ballyrashane
- Ballyronan
- Ballyrory
- Ballysally
- Ballyscullion
- Banagher
- Bellaghy
- Bellarena
- Benone
- Bogside
- Burnfoot

== C ==
CARNHILL SA

- Campsey
- Carrowclare
- Castledawson
- Castlerock
- Clady
- Claudy
- Coagh
- **Coleraine**
- Creagh
- Culmore
- Culnady
- Curran

== D ==
- **Derry** (has city status)
- Derrynaflaw
- Desertmartin
- Downhill
- Draperstown
- Drumahoe
- Drummullan
- Drumraighland
- Drumsurn
- Dungiven

== E ==
- Eglinton
- Elagh More
- Errigal

== F ==
- Feeny
- Foreglen

== G ==
- Garvagh
- Glack
- Glenone
- Glenullin
- Gortnahey
- Goshedan
- Greysteel
- Gulladuff

== I ==
- Inishrush

== K ==
- Killaloo
- Killywool
- Kilrea
- Kilcronaghan
- Knockloughrim

== L ==
- Largy
- Lavey
- Lenamore
- Lettershendoney
- **Limavady**
- Lisbunny
- Lissan
- The Loup

== M ==
- Macosquin
- Maghera
- **Magherafelt**
- Magilligan
- Maydown
- Moneymore
- Moneyneany

== N ==
- Newbuildings
- Nixon's Corner

== P ==
- Park
- **Portstewart**
- Prehen

== R ==
- Ringsend

== S ==
- Shanvey
- Straidarran
- Strathfoyle
- Straw
- Swatragh

== T ==
- Tamlaght
- Tamnaherin
- Tobermore
- Traad

== U ==
- Upperlands

== See also ==
- List of townlands in County Londonderry
- List of civil parishes of County Londonderry
