= List of places in County Antrim =

This is a list of cities, towns, villages and hamlets in County Antrim, Northern Ireland. See the List of places in Northern Ireland for places in other counties.

Towns are listed in bold.

== A ==
- Aghagallon
- Aghalee
- Ahoghill
- Aldergrove
- **Antrim**
- Armoy
- Aughafatten

== B ==
- Ballintoy
- Ballybogy
- Ballycarry
- **Ballycastle**
- **Ballyclare**
- Ballycraigy
- Ballyeaston
- Ballygalley
- Ballyhenry
- Ballylinney
- Ballymacash
- **Ballymena**
- **Ballymoney**
- Ballynure
- Ballyrobert
- Ballystrudder
- Ballyvoy
- Balnamore
- Barmeen
- **Belfast** (has city status)
- Bendooragh
- Broomhedge
- Broughshane
- Buckna
- Bushmills

== C ==
- Capecastle
- Cargan
- Carnalbanagh
- Carncastle
- Carnlough
- Carnmoney
- **Carrickfergus**
- Clogh
- Cloughmills
- Cogry-Kilbride
- Connor
- Craigarogan
- Crumlin
- Cullybackey
- Cushendall
- Cushendun

== D ==
- Dervock
- Derrymore
- Doagh
- Donegore
- Drains Bay
- Drumlough
- Dunadry
- Dunamuggy
- Dundrod
- Dunloy
- Dunmurry
- Dunseverick

== G ==
- Galgorm Parks
- Gawley's Gate
- Glenarm
- Glenavy
- Glengormley
- Glenoe
- Glynn
- Gracehill
- Grange Corner
- Greenisland
- Groggan

== J ==
- Jordanstown

== K ==
- Kells-Connor
- Kellswater
- Keshbridge
- Killead
- Knocknacarry

== L ==
- Lambeg
- **Larne**
- **Lisburn**
- Lisnagarvey
- Loanends
- Longkesh
- Loughguile
- Loughlynch
- Lower Ballinderry
- Lower Broomhedge
- Lurganure
- Lurganville

== M ==
- Maghaberry
- Magheramorne
- Mallusk
- Martinstown
- Maze
- Mill Bay
- Millbank
- Milltown (near Belfast)
- Mill Town (near Antrim)
- Moneyglass
- Monkstown
- Moss-Side
- Mounthill
- Mullaghboy

== N ==
Newtown Crommelin, Newtownabbey

== P ==
- Parkgate
- Portballintrae
- Portbraddon
- Portglenone
- **Portrush**

== R ==
- **Randalstown**
- Rasharkin
- Rathcoole
- Roughfort

== S ==
- Solar
- Stoneyford
- Straid
- Stranocum

== T ==
- Templepatrick
- Tobergill
- Toome
- Tullynacross

== U ==
- Upper Ballinderry

== W ==
- Waterfoot
- Whiteabbey
- **Whitehead**

== See also ==
- List of civil parishes of County Antrim
- List of townlands in County Antrim
