= List of towns and villages in Northern Ireland =

This is an alphabetical list of towns and villages in Northern Ireland. For a list sorted by population, see the list of settlements in Northern Ireland by population. Also included are: Armagh, Bangor, Belfast, Derry, Lisburn, and Newry which are classed as cities (see city status in the United Kingdom).

The Northern Ireland Statistics and Research Agency (NISRA) uses the following definitions:

- **Town** – population of 4,500 or more
  - Small Town – population between 4,500 and 10,000
  - Medium Town – population between 10,000 and 18,000
  - Large Town – population between 18,000 and 75,000
- **Intermediate settlement** – population between 2,250 and 4,500
- **Village** – population between 1,000 and 2,250
- **Small villages or hamlets** – population of less than 1,000

Towns are listed in bold.

== A ==
Acton, Aghacommon, Aghadowey, Aghadrumsee, Aghagallon, Aghalee, Ahoghill, Aldergrove, Altamuskin, Altishane, Altmore, Annaclone, Annaghmore, Annahilt, Annahugh, Annalong, Annsborough, Antrim, Ardboe, Ardgarvan, Ardglass, Ardmore, Ardstraw, Armagh, Armoy, Arney, Articlave, Artigarvan, Artikelly, Atticall, Aughafatten, Augher, Aughnacloy

== B ==
Ballela, Ballerin, Ballinamallard, Ballintoy, Balloo, Ballybogy, Ballycarry, Ballycassidy, Ballycastle, Ballyclare, Ballyeaston, Ballygally, Ballygawley, Ballygowan, Ballyhalbert, Ballyhornan, Ballykelly, Ballykinler, Ballylesson, Ballylinney, Ballymacmaine, Ballymacnab, Ballymagorry, Ballymartin, Ballymaguigan, Ballymena, Ballymoney, Ballynahinch, Ballynure, Ballyrashane, Ballyrobert, Ballyronan, Ballyrory, Ballyscullion, Ballyskeagh, Ballystrudder, Ballyvoy, Ballywalter, Balnamore, Banagher, Banbridge, Bangor, Bannfoot, Belcoo, Belfast, Bellaghy, Bellanaleck, Bellarena, Belleek, Belleeks, Benburb, Bendooragh, Beragh, Bessbrook, Blackskull, Blackwatertown, Blaney, Bleary, Boho, Brackaville, Bready, Brockagh, Brookeborough, Broomhill, Broughshane, Bryansford, Buckna, Burnfoot, Burren, Bushmills

== C ==
Caledon, Camlough, Campsie, Capecastle, Cappagh, Cargan, Carnalbanagh, Carncastle, Carnlough, Carnteel, Carrickaness, Carrickfergus, Carrickmore, Carrowclare, Carrowdore, Carrybridge, Carryduff, Castlecaulfield, Castledawson, Castlederg, Castlerock, Castlewellan, Charlemont, Clabby, Clady (Co. Londonderry), Clady (Co. Tyrone), Cladymore, Clanabogan, Clare, Claudy, Clogh, Clogher, Cloghy, Clonmore, Clonoe, Clough, Cloughoge, Cloughmills, Coagh, Coalisland, Cogry-Kilbride, Coleraine, Collegeland, Comber, Conlig, Cookstown, Corbet, Corkey, Corrinshego, Craigarogan, Craigavon, Cranagh, Crawfordsburn, Creagh, Creggan, Crossgar, Crossmaglen, Crumlin, Cullaville, Cullybackey, Cullyhanna, Culmore, Culnady, Curran, Cushendall, Cushendun

== D ==
Darkley, Dechomet, Derry, Derrycrin, Derrygonnelly, Derryhale, Derrykeighan, Derrylin, Derrymacash, Derrymore, Derrynaflaw, Derrynoose, Derrytrasna, Derrytresk, Derryvore, Dervock, Desertmartin, Doagh, Dollingstown, Donagh, Donaghadee, Donaghcloney, Donaghey, Donaghmore, Donegore, Dooish, Dorsey, Douglas Bridge, Downhill, Downpatrick, Draperstown, Drains Bay, Dromara, Dromintee, Dromore (Co. Down), Dromore (Co. Tyrone), Drumaness, Drumbeg, Drumbo, Drumlaghy, Drumlough (near Hillsborough), Drumlough (near Rathfriland), Drummullan, Drumnacanvy, Drumnakilly, Drumquin, Drumraighland, Drumsurn, Dunadry, Dundonald, Dundrod, Dundrum, Dungannon, Dungiven, Dunloy, Dunnamanagh, Dunmurry, Dunnamore, Dunnaval, Dunseverick

== E ==
Edenaveys, Edenderry (Co. Down), Edenderry (Co. Tyrone), Ederney, Eglinton, Eglish, Enniskillen, Erganagh, Eskra

== F ==
Feeny, Finaghy, Fintona, Finvoy, Fivemiletown, Florencecourt, Foreglen, Forkill

== G ==
Galbally, Gamblestown, Garrison, Garvagh, Garvaghey, Garvetagh, Gawley's Gate, Gibson's Hill, Gilford, Gillygooly, Glack, Glebe, Glenarm, Glenavy, Glencull, Glengormley, Glenmornan, Glenoe, Glenone, Glynn, Gortaclare, Gortin, Gortnahey, Goshedan, Gracehill, Grange Corner, Granville, Greencastle, Greenisland, Greyabbey, Greysteel, Groggan, Groomsport, Gulladuff

== H ==
Halfpenny Gate, Hamiltonsbawn, Helen's Bay, Hillhall, Hillsborough, Hilltown, Holywell, Holywood

== I ==
Inishrush, Irvinestown, Islandmagee

== J ==
Jonesborough, Jerrettspass, Jordanstown

== K ==
Katesbridge, Keady, Kells-Connor, Kellswater, Kesh, Keshbridge, Kilcoo, Kildress, Kilkeel, Killadeas, Killaloo, Killay, Killead, Killeen, Killen, Killeter, Killinchy, Killough, Killowen, Killylea, Killyleagh, Killyman, Killywool, Kilmore (Co. Armagh), Kilmore (Co. Down), Kilrea, Kilskeery, Kinallen, Kinawley, Kircubbin, Knockcloghrim, Knockmoyle, Knocknacarry

== L ==
Lack, Lambeg, Landahaussy, Largy, Larne, Laurelvale, Lawrencetown, Leitrim, Letterbreen, Lettershendoney, Limavady, Lisbellaw, Lisburn, Lislea, Lisnadill, Lisnarick, Lisnaskea, Listooder, Loughbrickland, Loughgall, Loughgilly, Loughguile, Loughinisland, Loughmacrory, Loup, Lower Ballinderry, Lurgan, Lurganare, Lurganure, Lurganville,

== M ==
Macken, Macosquin, Madden, Maghaberry, Maghera, Magheraconluce, Magherafelt, Magheralin, Magheramason, Magheramorne, Magheraveely, Maghery, Maguiresbridge, Markethill, Martinstown, Maydown, Mayobridge, Mazetown, Meigh, Middletown, Milford, Millbank, Mill Bay, Millisle, Milltown (Co. Antrim), Moira, Monea, Moneyglass, Moneymore, Moneyneany, Moneyreagh, Moneyslane, Monteith, Moortown, Moss-Side, Mountfield, Mountjoy, Mounthill, Mountnorris, Moy, Moygashel, Mullaghbawn, Mullaghboy, Mullaghbrack, Mullaghglass, Mallusk

== N ==
Newbuildings, Newcastle, Newry, Newtown Crommelin, Newtownabbey, Newtownards, Newtownbutler, Newtowncloghoge, Newtownhamilton, Newtownstewart, Nixon's Corner, Newmills

== O ==
Omagh, Orritor

== P ==
Park, Parkgate, Plumbridge, Pomeroy, Portadown, Portaferry, Portavogie, Portballintrae, Portbraddon, Portglenone, Portrush, Portstewart, Poyntzpass

== R ==
Raloo, Randalstown, Rasharkin, Rathfriland, Ravernet, Richhill, Ringsend, Rock, Rosslea, Rostrevor, Roughfort, Rousky

== S ==
Saintfield, Sandholes, Scarva, Scotch Street, Seaforde, Seskinore, Shanmaghery, Shanvey, Sheeptown, Shrigley, Silverbridge, Sion Mills, Sixmilecross, Skea, Spa, Spamount, Springfield, Stewartstown, Stoneyford, Strabane, Straid, Straidarran, Strangford, Stranocum, Strathfoyle, Straw, Swatragh

== T ==
Tamlaght (Co. Fermanagh), Tamlaght (Co. Londonderry), Tamnamore, Tandragee, Tartaraghan, Teemore, Temple, Templepatrick, Tempo, The Birches, Tobermore, Toome, Trillick, Trory, Tullyhogue, Tullyhommon, Tullylish, Tullynacross, Tullywiggan, Tynan

== U ==
Upper Ballinderry, Upperlands

== V ==
Victoria Bridge

== W ==
Waringsford, Waringstown, Warrenpoint, Washing Bay, Waterfoot, Wattlebridge, Whitecross, Whitehead, Whiterock, Whitehouse (Antrim), Whitehouse (Tyrone)

== See also ==
- List of localities in Northern Ireland by population
- List of settlements on the island of Ireland by population
- List of towns and villages in the Republic of Ireland
- List of places in Northern Ireland
- List of places in Ireland
- List of cities in Ireland and List of cities in the United Kingdom
