= List of places in County Down =

Places in Northern Ireland

County Down is one of the six counties of Northern Ireland.

County Down is bordered by County Antrim to the north, the Irish Sea to the east, County Armagh to the west and County Louth in the Republic of Ireland across Carlingford Lough to the southwest.

This list shows towns and cities in bold.

== A ==
- Annaclone
- Annahilt
- Annalong
- Annsborough
- Ardglass
- Attical
- Aughnacloy

== B ==
- Ballela
- Balloo
- Ballybannan
- Ballybeen
- Ballycottin
- Ballydargan
- Ballygowan
- Ballyhalbert
- Ballyhay
- Ballyholme
- Ballyhornan
- Ballykinler
- Ballylesson
- Ballymacmaine
- Ballymartin
- Ballynagarrick
- Ballynahatty
- **Ballynahinch**
- Ballynoe
- Ballyskeagh
- Ballywalter
- Ballyward
- **Banbridge**
- **Bangor**
- **Belfast** (City – partially in County Down, but mainly in County Antrim)
- Benraw
- Blackskull
- Braniel
- Bryansford
- Burren

== C ==
- Cabra
- Carrowdore
- **Carryduff**
- **Castlewellan**
- Cloghy
- Clough
- **Comber**
- Conlig
- Corbet
- Craigavad
- Crawfordsburn
- Cregagh
- Crossgar
- Cultra

== D ==
- Dechomet
- Derryneill
- **Donaghadee**
- Donaghcloney
- **Downpatrick**
- Dromara
- **Dromore**
- Drumaness
- Drumaroad
- Drumbeg
- Drumbo
- Drumlough
- **Dundonald**
- Dundrum
- Dunnaval

== E ==
- Edenderry

== G ==
- Gamblestown
- Gilford
- Gilnahirk
- Gransha
- Greencastle
- Greyabbey
- Groomsport

== H ==
- Helen's Bay
- Hillhall
- Hillsborough
- Hilltown
- **Holywood**

== K ==
- Katesbridge
- Kilcoo
- **Kilkeel**
- Killinchy
- Killinure
- Killough
- Killowen
- Killyleagh
- Kilmore
- Kinallen
- Kircubbin
- Kilclief

== L ==
- Lawrencetown
- Legacurry
- Legananny
- Leitrim
- Lenaderg
- **Lisburn** (City – partially in County Down, but mainly in County Antrim)
- Listooder
- Loughbrickland
- Loughinisland
- Lurganare
- Lurganville

== M ==
- Magheraconluce
- Magheralin
- Mayobridge
- Maze
- Millisle
- Moira
- Moneyreagh
- Moneyslane
- Monteith

== N ==
- **Newcastle**
- **Newry** (City – in counties Armagh and Down, divided by the Clanrye River)
- **Newtownards**
- Newtowncloghoge

== P ==
- Portaferry
- Portavogie
- Poyntzpass

== R ==
- Rathfriland
- Ravernet
- Ringhaddy
- Rostrevor

== S ==
- Saintfield
- Saul
- Scarva
- Seaforde
- Seahill
- Sheeptown
- Shrigley
- Spa
- Strangford

== T ==
- Tievenadarragh
- Tullylish
- Tullynakill

== W ==
- **Warrenpoint**
- Waringsford
- Waringstown
- Whiterock

== See also ==
- List of civil parishes of County Down
- List of townlands in County Down
