= List of places in County Armagh =

This is a list of cities, towns, villages and hamlets in County Armagh, Northern Ireland. See the list of places in Northern Ireland for places in other counties.

Towns are listed in bold.

== A ==
- Acton
- Aghacommon
- Annaghmore
- Annahugh
- Annaloist
- Ardress
- **Armagh**
- Aughanduff

== B ==
- Ballymacnab
- Bannfoot
- Belleeks
- Bessbrook
- Blackwatertown
- Bleary
- Broomhill
- Ballydougan

== C ==
- Camlough
- Carrickaness
- Charlemont
- Cladymore
- Clonmore
- Collegeland
- Corrinshego
- **Craigavon**
- Creeveroe
- Creggan
- Crossmaglen
- Cullaville
- Cullyhanna

== D ==
- Darkley
- Derryadd
- Derrycrew
- Derryhale
- Derrymacash
- Derrynoose
- Derrytrasna
- Dollingstown
- Dorsey
- Dromintee
- Drumnacanvy

== E ==
- Edenaveys

== F ==
- Forkill

== G ==
- Gibson's Hill
- Granemore

== J ==
- Jonesborough

== K ==
- Keady
- Kernan
- Killean
- Killylea
- Kilmore

== L ==
- Lislea
- Lisnadill
- Loughgall
- Loughgilly
- **Lurgan**

== M ==
- Madden
- Maghery
- Markethill
- Meigh
- Middletown
- Milford
- Mountnorris
- Mullaghbawn
- Mullaghbrack
- Mullaghglass
- Mullavilly-Laurelvale

== N ==
- **Newry** (part)
- Newtownhamilton

== P ==
- **Portadown**
- Poyntzpass

== R ==
- Richhill

== S ==
- Scotch Street
- Silverbridge

== T ==
- Tannaghmore North
- Tandragee
- Tartaraghan
- The Birches
- Tullynawood
- Tynan

== W ==
- Whitecross
- Waringstown

== See also ==
- List of civil parishes of County Armagh
- List of townlands in County Armagh
