= List of places in Ireland =

This is a list of places in Ireland.

== All-island lists ==
- List of counties
  - List of counties by area
  - List of counties by population
- List of baronies
- List of cities
- List of islands
- List of loughs
- List of mountains
- List of rivers
- List of canals
- List of ports
- List of castles
- List of cathedrals
- List of Roman Catholic dioceses
- List of Church of Ireland dioceses
- List of megalithic monuments
- List of railway stations
- List of stadiums
- List of lighthouses
- List of windmills

== Republic of Ireland-specific lists ==
- List of airports in the Republic of Ireland
- List of towns and villages in the Republic of Ireland
- List of urban areas in the Republic of Ireland
- List of county and city councils in the Republic of Ireland
- List of constituencies in the Republic of Ireland

== Northern Ireland-specific lists ==
- List of towns and villages in Northern Ireland
- List of localities in Northern Ireland by population
- List of district councils in Northern Ireland
- List of constituencies in Northern Ireland

== County-specific lists ==
=== Antrim ===
Navbox

- List of places in County Antrim
- List of civil parishes of County Antrim
- List of townlands of County Antrim

=== Armagh ===
Navbox

- List of places in County Armagh
- List of civil parishes of County Armagh
- List of townlands of County Armagh

=== Carlow ===
Navbox

- List of townlands of County Carlow

=== Cavan ===
Navbox

- List of townlands of County Cavan

=== Clare ===
Navbox

- List of townlands of County Clare

=== Cork ===
Navbox

- List of townlands of County Cork

=== Donegal ===
Navbox

- List of townlands of County Donegal

=== Down ===
Navbox

- List of places in County Down
- List of civil parishes of County Down
- List of townlands in County Down

=== Dublin ===
Navbox

- List of streets and squares in Dublin
- List of Dublin bridges and tunnels
- List of rivers in County Dublin, sortable list
- List of mountains and hills of County Dublin
- Mountains Navbox
- List of townlands of County Dublin, a sortable list with land area, barony, civil parish, and poor law union details

=== Fermanagh ===
Navbox

- List of places in County Fermanagh
- List of civil parishes of County Fermanagh
- List of townlands in County Fermanagh

=== Galway ===
Navbox

- List of townlands of County Galway

=== Kerry ===
Navbox

- List of townlands of County Kerry

=== Kildare ===
Navbox

- List of townlands of County Kildare

=== Kilkenny ===
Navbox

- List of townlands of County Kilkenny

=== Laois ===
Navbox

- List of townlands of County Laois

=== Leitrim ===
Navbox

- List of townlands of County Leitrim

=== Limerick ===
Navbox

- List of townlands of County Limerick

=== Londonderry ===
Navbox

- List of places in County Londonderry
- List of civil parishes of County Londonderry
- List of townlands in County Londonderry

=== Longford ===
Navbox

- List of townlands of County Longford

=== Louth ===
Navbox

- List of townlands of County Louth

=== Mayo ===
Navbox

- List of townlands of County Mayo
- List of loughs of County Mayo
- List of mountains and hills of County Mayo
- List of rivers of County Mayo
- List of roads of County Mayo

=== Meath ===
Navbox

- List of townlands of County Meath

=== Monaghan ===
Navbox

- List of townlands of County Monaghan

=== Offaly ===
Navbox

- List of townlands of County Offaly

=== Roscommon ===
Navbox

- List of townlands of County Roscommon

=== Sligo ===
Navbox

- List of townlands of County Sligo

=== Tipperary ===
- List of townlands of County Tipperary

=== Tyrone ===
Navbox

- List of places in County Tyrone
- List of civil parishes of County Tyrone
- List of townlands of County Tyrone

=== Waterford ===
Navbox

- List of townlands of County Waterford

=== Westmeath ===
Navbox

- List of townlands of County Westmeath

=== Wexford ===
Navbox

- List of townlands of County Wexford

=== Wicklow ===
Navbox

- List of townlands of County Wicklow
