= Donahey =

Donahey is a surname. Notable people called Donahey include:

- A. Victor Donahey (1873–1946), Democratic Party politician from Ohio, U.S.A.
- E. D. Donahey (born 1962), professional name of American journalist and CNN news presenter E. D. Hill
- Gertrude Walton Donahey (1908–2004), American Democratic politician, Ohio State Treasurer
- John W. Donahey (1905–1967), American Democratic politician, 53rd Lieutenant Governor of Ohio
- William Donahey (1883–1970), U.S. cartoonist and creator of The Teenie Weenies

== See also ==
- Donaghey
