= Gillygooly =

Village in County Tyrone, Northern Ireland

Coordinates: 54.614°N 7.357°W

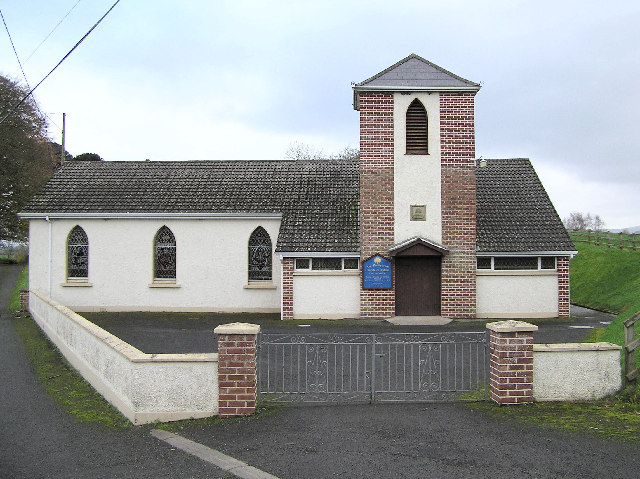
Gillygooley Presbyterian Church.

Gillygooly is a small village and townland west of Omagh in County Tyrone, Northern Ireland. In the 2001 Census it had a population of 72 people. It lies within the former Omagh District Council area. The earliest reference to the townland of Gillygooly is the anglicisation 'Killagauland' from c. 1655, which may be the original from the native name Coill na Gualann, probably meaning 'Wood of the Hill-Shoulder'.

== See also ==
- List of villages in Northern Ireland
