= Altamuskin =

Village in County Tyrone, Northern Ireland

Coordinates: 54°31′N 7°05′W

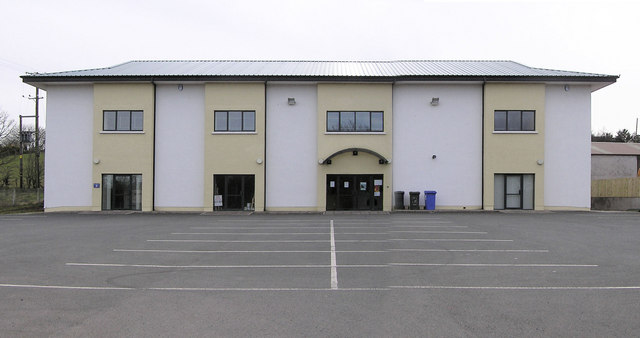
Altamuskin Community Hall

Altamuskin or Altamooskan (Irish: Allt a' Mhúscáin, meaning 'Glen of the spongy ground') is a small village and townland in County Tyrone, Northern Ireland. It is situated in the historic barony of Clogher and the civil parish of Errigal Keerogue and covers an area of 1165 acres. Altamuskin Community Hall provides sports, youthclub, playgroup and part-time post office and credit union facilities.

== Demographics ==
In the 2011 census, Altamuskin had a population of 127 people (54 houses). It lies within the Fermanagh and Omagh District Council area and is home to St Bridget's Altamuskin. The population of the townland declined during the 19th century:

Year	1841	1851	1861	1871	1881	1891
Population	259	231	224	214	211	159
Houses	42	35	37	30	32	28

== See also ==
- List of villages in Northern Ireland
- List of townlands of County Tyrone
