= Garvetagh =

Village in Northern Ireland

Coordinates: 54.684°N 7.578°W

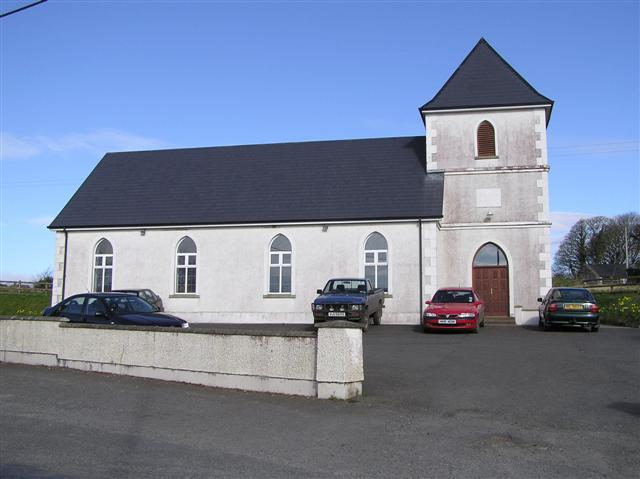
St Andrew's church

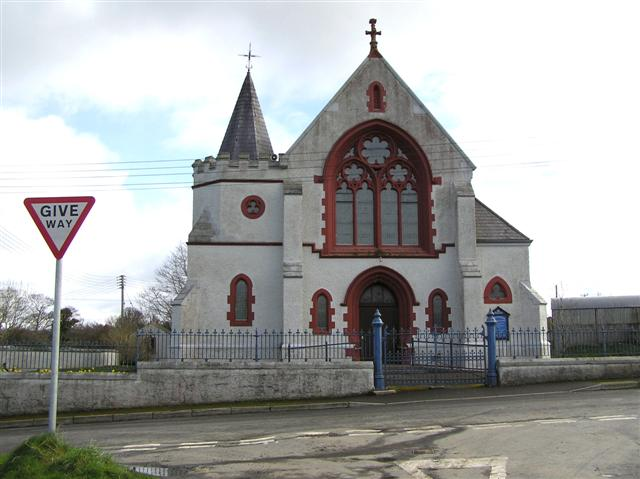
Presbyterian church

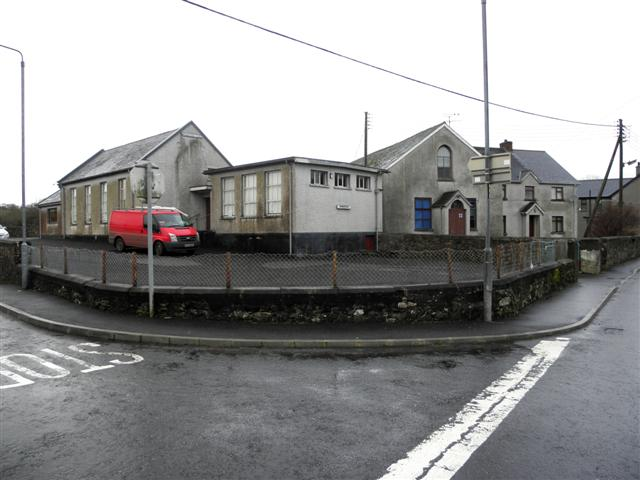
Primary school and church hall

Garvetagh is a small village in County Tyrone, Northern Ireland, near Castlederg. In the 2001 Census it had a population of 69 people. It lies within the Strabane District Council area.

== See also ==
- List of villages in Northern Ireland
