= Millbank, County Antrim =

Village in County Antrim, Northern Ireland

Coordinates: 54.699°N 6.031°W

Millbank is a small village in County Antrim, Northern Ireland. It is mostly within the townland of Carnanee, slightly north of Roughfort, between Templepatrick and Newtownabbey. In the 2001 Census it had a population of 93 people. It is in Newtownabbey Borough Council area.

== See also ==
- List of towns and villages in Northern Ireland
