= Lenamore =

- townland

- Location within the United Kingdom
- Coordinates: 54.956°N 6.84283°W

Lenamore is a townland in County Londonderry, Northern Ireland. It is at the foot of the mountain Benbradagh near Dungiven. It was once a village more populous than Drumsurn until the introduction of electricity to that village. It is situated within Causeway Coast and Glens district.

== Other example ==
The village of Legan, County Longford is also known as Lenamore.

== See also ==
- List of villages in Northern Ireland
- List of towns in Northern Ireland
