= Orritor =

Coordinates: 54.656655°N 6.809576°W

Orritor: Irish: Na Coracha Beaga
- Townland
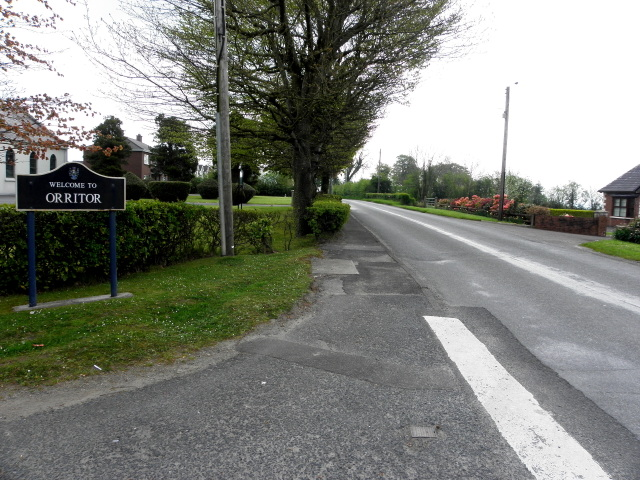
- Welcome to Orritor sign

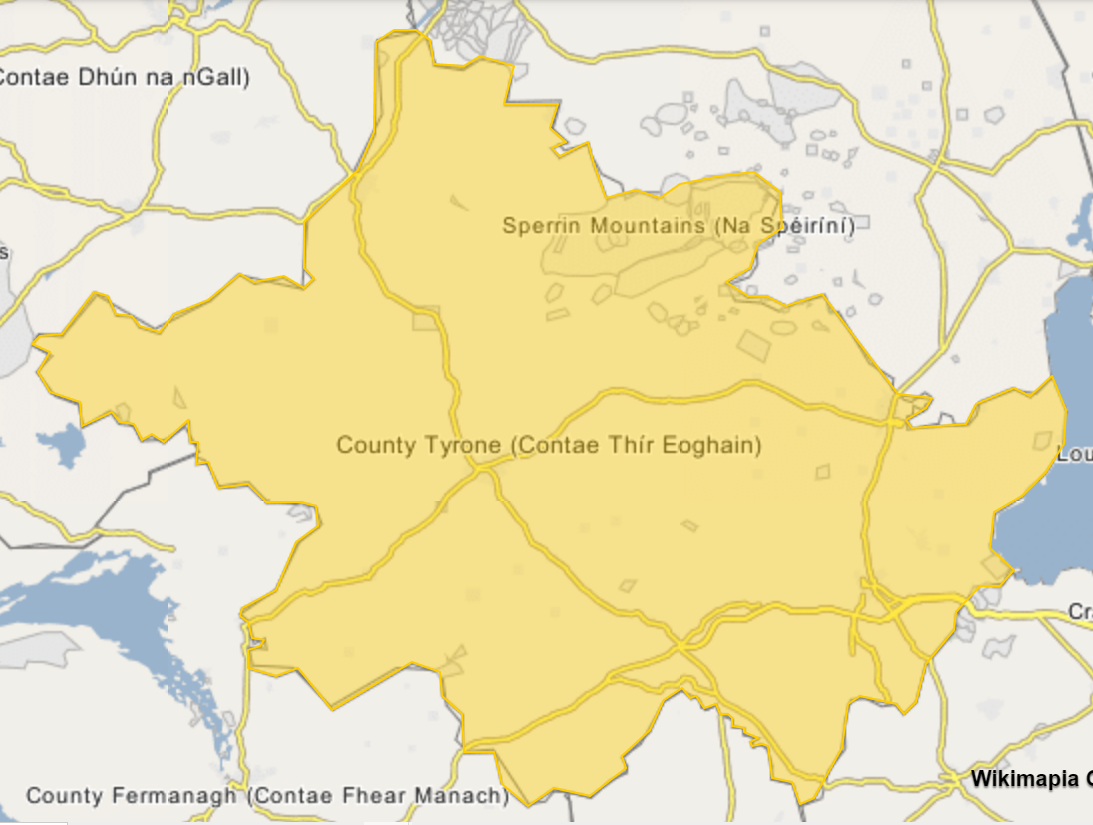
- Location within Northern Ireland
- District: Mid Ulster District Council
- County: County Tyrone
- Country: Northern Ireland
- Sovereign state: United Kingdom
- Post town: COOKSTOWN
- Postcode district: BT80
- Police: Northern Ireland
- Fire: Northern Ireland
- Ambulance: Northern Ireland
- UK Parliament: Mid Ulster
- NI Assembly: Mid Ulster

Orritor (Irish: Na Coracha Beaga), also known as Oritor and originally Araghter, is a townland in County Tyrone, Northern Ireland.

== History ==
The present name of Orritor (the anglicised form of Araghter) came from Manor Orritor, the third manor built in County Tyrone by the first Earl of Castlestewart on land he purchased in the area in 1782. The Manor also went by the aliases of Orator, Auraghter, and Manor Annesley.

The Orritor Presbyterian congregation of the Presbyterian Church in Ireland was founded in 1824.

Orritor is also one of the circuits in Cookstown 100 motorcycle races.

== Education ==
The local primary school is Orritor Primary School.

== See also ==
- List of towns and villages in Northern Ireland
