= Longkesh =

Village in County Antrim, Northern Ireland

Coordinates: 54°29′03″N 6°07′12″W

Longkesh is a small village in County Antrim, Northern Ireland, near Lisburn. In the 2001 Census it had a population of 201 people. It is situated in the Lisburn City Council area.

== Places of interest ==
Longkesh was the site of Long Kesh prison, later known as 'The Maze'. Formerly a Royal Air Force Base, the 140 ha (350-acre) prison hosted thousands of prisoners during The Troubles, several of whom died during a hunger strike. It has been announced that the prison will be redeveloped into a 'peace centre'.

== See also ==
- List of villages in Northern Ireland
- List of towns in Northern Ireland
