= Gamblestown =

Village in County Down, Northern Ireland

Coordinates: 54.428°N 6.234°W

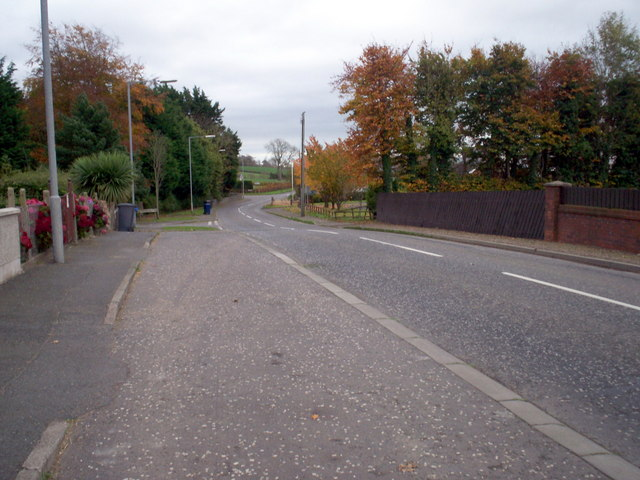
- The Dromore Road at Gamblestown Village

- Location within County Down
- Irish grid reference: J 083 475
- District: Armagh City, Banbridge and Craigavon
- County: County Down
- Country: Northern Ireland
- Sovereign state: United Kingdom
- Post town: DROMORE
- Postcode district: BT25
- Dialling code: 028
- UK Parliament: Upper Bann
- NI Assembly: Upper Bann

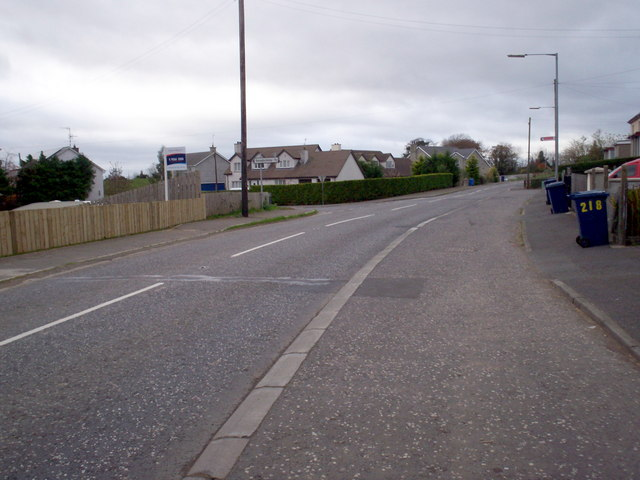
Dromore Road, Gamblestown

Gamblestown is a small village in County Down, Northern Ireland about a mile from Donaghcloney, on the Lurgan to Dromore road. It is situated in the Parish of Magheralin and the townland of Clogher. In the 2021 census it had a population of 141 people. It is situated to the southeast of the Craigavon Borough Council area.

The village is largely composed of residential development, a church hall and some retail warehousing, but is without other facilities. Historically, Gamblestown developed as a small rural settlement centered around a cluster of farm workers' cottages located along the Dromore Road. The village's growth has remained modest, with approximately 50 residential properties currently established in 2010. In the 1970s, the Gamblestown Park housing estate was constructed, marking the first significant expansion of the settlement. Subsequent development has primarily consisted of individual dwellings built along the road frontages.

Gamblestown contains an Area of Archaeological Potential (AAP) located within the northern portion of the village, specifically on lands to the east and west of Drumnabreeze Road. This designation indicates that the area may hold archaeological interest or significance, although no specific archaeological sites or monuments are recorded within the settlement itself.

The earliest recorded instance of the townland Clogher appears in a 1666, whereas earlier documents consistently use the form Crogher. Alternative Irish terms such as cróchar ("bier") and cnochaire ("heap of footed turf") have been suggested, though it is more likely that the original name Clogher was misread as Crogher due to the visual similarity between the letters "l" and "r". The Irish element clochar (An Clochar) is generally interpreted as "a stony place".

== See also ==
- List of villages in Northern Ireland
