= Scotch Street =

Village in County Armagh, Northern Ireland

Coordinates: 54.44050°N 6.50871°W

Scotch Street: Irish: Sráid na nAlbanach
- Location within Northern Ireland
- Population: 668
- Irish grid reference: H 970 551
  - Belfast: 26 mi (42 km)
- District: Armagh City, Banbridge and Craigavon
- County: County Armagh
- Country: Northern Ireland
- Sovereign state: United Kingdom
- Post town: CRAIGAVON
- Postcode district: BT62
- Dialling code: 028
- UK Parliament: Upper Bann
- NI Assembly: Upper Bann

Scotch Street is a village in County Armagh, Northern Ireland. It is within the townland of Timakeel (from the Irish Tigh Mhic Caoil) and part of the Armagh City, Banbridge and Craigavon Borough Council area. In the 2021 Census it had a population of 668 people.

Within the village there is a post office, gospel hall, primary school and a filling station.

Richmount Primary School has grown in numbers since the building of new estates on either side of Scotch Street.

Scotch Street is mainly a unionist area, with a majority population of Protestants living in the area. There has been an increasing number of foreign nationals who also live in the area.

The village is the only significant settlement between the large town of Portadown in County Armagh and the village of Moy in County Tyrone. Rapid growth in the population of the settlement has come about with the development of many new housing estates including Keelmount Grange and Timakeel Close.

== See also ==
- List of villages in Northern Ireland
- List of towns in Northern Ireland
