= Mounthill =

Village in County Antrim, Northern Ireland

Coordinates: 54.809°N 5.864°W

Mounthill is a small village in County Antrim, Northern Ireland, near Larne. In the 2021 Census, it had a population of 128 people. It is situated in the Larne Borough Council area.

== See also ==
- List of villages in Northern Ireland
- List of towns in Northern Ireland
