= Nixon's Corner =

Village in County Londonderry, Northern Ireland

Coordinates: 54.979°N 7.374°W

Nixon's Corner is a small village in County Londonderry, Northern Ireland. In the 2001 Census it had a population of 201 people. It is situated within Derry and Strabane district.

Nixon's Corner was once the location of a British army border checkpoint installation prior to demilitarisation.

== See also ==
- List of villages in Northern Ireland
- List of towns in Northern Ireland
