= Ballymacmaine =

Village in County Down, Northern Ireland

Coordinates: 54°27′35″N 6°16′07″W

Ballymacmaine (from Irish Baile Mhic Mhiacháin 'MacMiacháin's townland') is a small village and townland in County Down, Northern Ireland. it is between Dollingstown and Magheralin, on the A3 route from Lurgan to Moira. In the 2001 Census it had a population of 57 people. It is within Craigavon Borough Council area.

It is a small settlement with several non-residential land uses, including commercial, recreational and community facilities.

== See also ==
- List of villages in Northern Ireland
