= Donaghey =

Village in County Tyrone, Northern Ireland

Coordinates: 54°35′N 6°44′W

- Village
- Country: Northern Ireland
- Sovereign state: United Kingdom
- Police: Northern Ireland
- Fire: Northern Ireland
- Ambulance: Northern Ireland

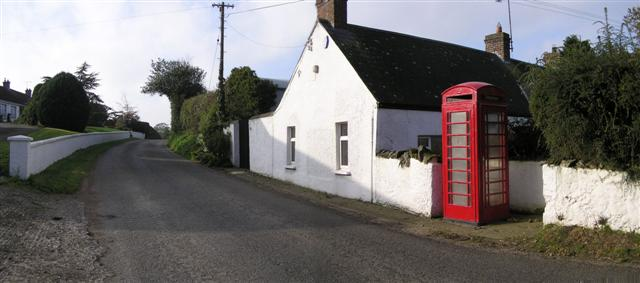
Donaghey in 2006

Donaghey (from Irish Domhnach Eich, meaning 'church of the horse' or Dún Eachaidh) is a small village and townland roughly halfway between Cookstown and Dungannon, just off the A29, in County Tyrone, Northern Ireland.

Donaghey has a range of facilities including a congregational church, a community hall, a primary school and a post office.

== Education ==
Donaghey Primary School

== Religion ==
- Donaghey Congregational Church

== Donaghey townland ==
The townland is situated in the historic barony of Dungannon Middle and the civil parish of Donaghenry and covers an area of 258 acres.

The population of the townland declined during the 19th century:

Year	1841	1851	1861	1871	1881	1891
Population	215	152	128	120	102	75
Houses	42	26	29	26	21	19

== See also ==
- List of villages in Northern Ireland
- List of townlands of County Tyrone
