= Artikelly =

Village in County Londonderry, Northern Ireland

- village and townland
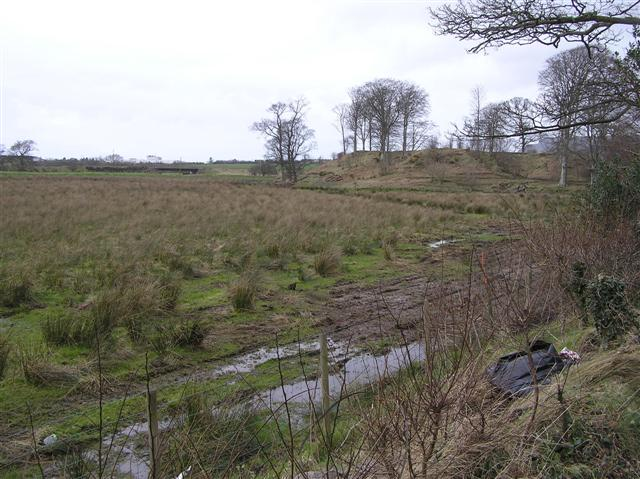
- Artikelly, Limavady Looking to the north

- Location within the United Kingdom
- Coordinates: 55°04′N 6°56′W
- Sovereign State: United Kingdom
- Constituent Country: Northern Ireland
- Province: Ulster
- County: Londonderry

Artikelly (from Irish Ard Tí Cheallaigh, meaning 'height of Ceallaigh's house') is a small village and townland in County Londonderry, Northern Ireland. In the 2001 Census, it had a population of 360 people. It is 1 km north east of Limavady and adjoins the major industrial area at Aghanloo. It is situated within Causeway Coast and Glens district.

== History ==
In the Plantation of Ulster, the Haberdashers' Company were granted an estate of 36.1 square miles (93 km^{2}). They made their ‘capital’ at Ballycastle or Ballycaslan, near Aghanloo, and a second settlement at Artikelly. Artikelly was the largest hamlet in the former Limavady Borough Council area, with a population of 360 in 2001.

== People ==
William Porter (1805-1880) was born in Artikelly. He was called to the Bar in 1831, and in 1839, was appointed Attorney General at the Cape. He was offered a knighthood and Premiership of the Cape, both of which he declined. He endowed a university there and was its first chancellor. In 1873, he returned to Ireland. He died in Belfast.

== See also ==
- List of villages in Northern Ireland
