= Newtowncloghoge =

Village in County Armagh, Northern Ireland

Coordinates: 54.129°N 6.356°W

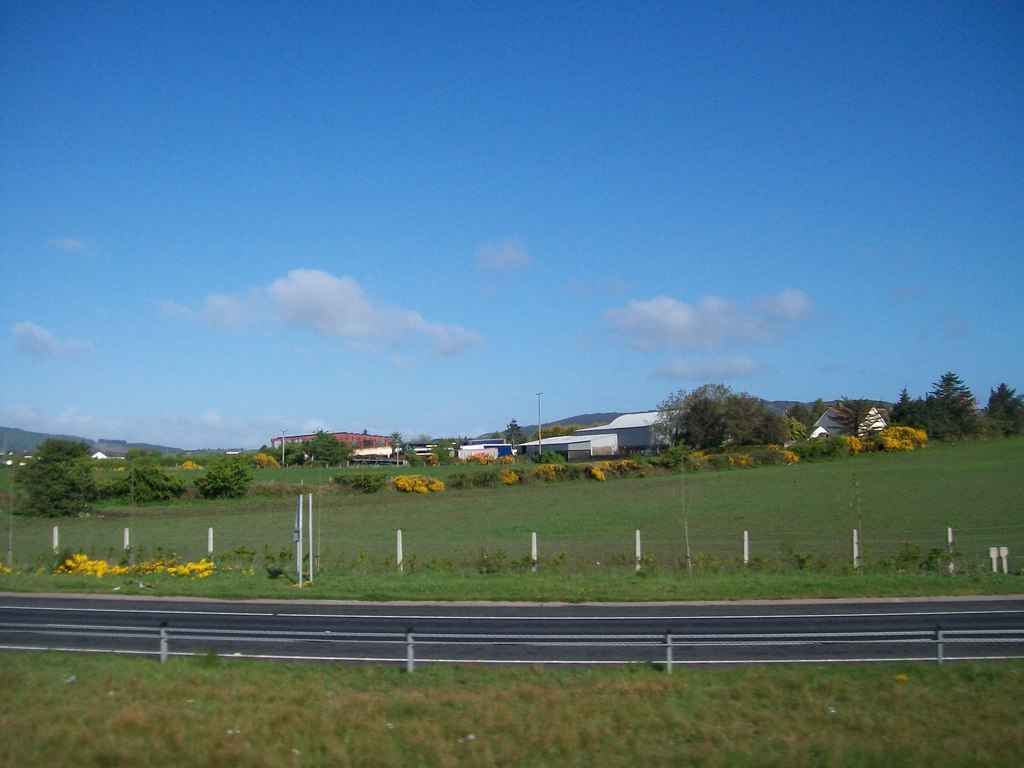
Farm at Newtowncloghoge, seen from the A1 road

Newtowncloghoge (usually /ˌnjuːtənˈklɔːɡ/) is a small village in County Armagh, Northern Ireland. In the 2001 Census it had a population of 357 people. It lies within the Newry and Mourne District Council area, west of the A1 road.

== See also ==
- List of villages in Northern Ireland
- List of towns in Northern Ireland
