= Grange Corner =

Village in County Antrim, Northern Ireland

Coordinates: 54.795°N 6.398°W

Grange Corner is a small village in County Antrim, Northern Ireland. It is situated in the Borough of Ballymena. It had a population of 468 people (282 households) in the 2011 census, up from 282 in 2001.

== See also ==
- List of towns and villages in Northern Ireland
