= Gibson's Hill =

Village in County Armagh, Northern Ireland

Coordinates: 54.430°N 6.337°W

Gibson's Hill: Corcreeny
- Village
- Location within Northern Ireland
- Population: 264 (2021 census)
- OS grid reference: J045602
  - Belfast: 21 mi (34 km) NE
  - Dublin: 75 mi (121 km) S
- Country: Northern Ireland
- Sovereign state: United Kingdom
- Places: List: Lakeview House; Corcreeny Orange Hall; Gibson's Hill Gospel Hall
- Post town: LURGAN
- Postcode district: BT66
- Dialling code: 028
- Police: Northern Ireland
- Fire: Northern Ireland
- Ambulance: Northern Ireland
- UK Parliament: Upper Bann

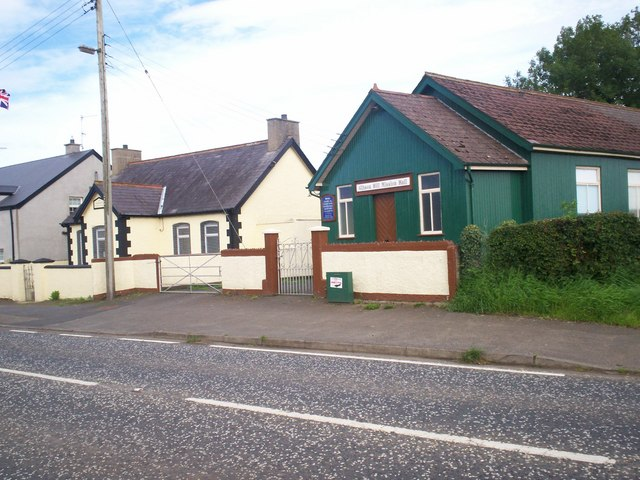
Corcreeny Orange Hall and Gibson's Hill Gospel Hall

Gibson's Hill or Corcreeny (from Irish Corr Chríonaigh, meaning 'round hill of dry branches') is a small village in the townland of Corcreeny in County Armagh, Northern Ireland, about 1.5 km from Lurgan. It lies on the main Lurgan to Gilford road. In the 2001 Census it had a population of 186 people. It is within the Craigavon Borough Council area.

The village has limited community facilities. Lakeview House, to the east, and the area around it, are an attractive landscape and historic feature. It is a two-storey, late-19th-century house, approached through a beech tree avenue.

In September 2018, Lakeview House, the late-19th-century residence, was demolished to make way for a housing development, prompting strong opposition from local residents. Despite its location within a Local Landscape Policy Area (LLPA), the house was not listed or in a conservation area, so its demolition did not require special consent. The site, including 9.5 acres of land, was sold for £375,000, and plans were approved for 36 new homes. Residents had previously blocked a 2008 proposal for 44 houses on the same site.

Lakeview House was known for its elegant proportions and picturesque setting. The property featured a long beech-lined avenue, extensive landscaped gardens, and a walled garden that was considered a key element of its historic character. Prior to its demolition in 2018 following a fire, the house was described as a “key focal point within the landscape” and had lain vacant for several years. The site has since been proposed for redevelopment into luxury apartments, with plans to restore the walled garden and maintain the landscaped grounds in keeping with the original estate.

== See also ==
- List of villages in Northern Ireland
