= Spa, County Down =

Village in County Down, Northern Ireland

Coordinates: 54.375°N 5.899°W

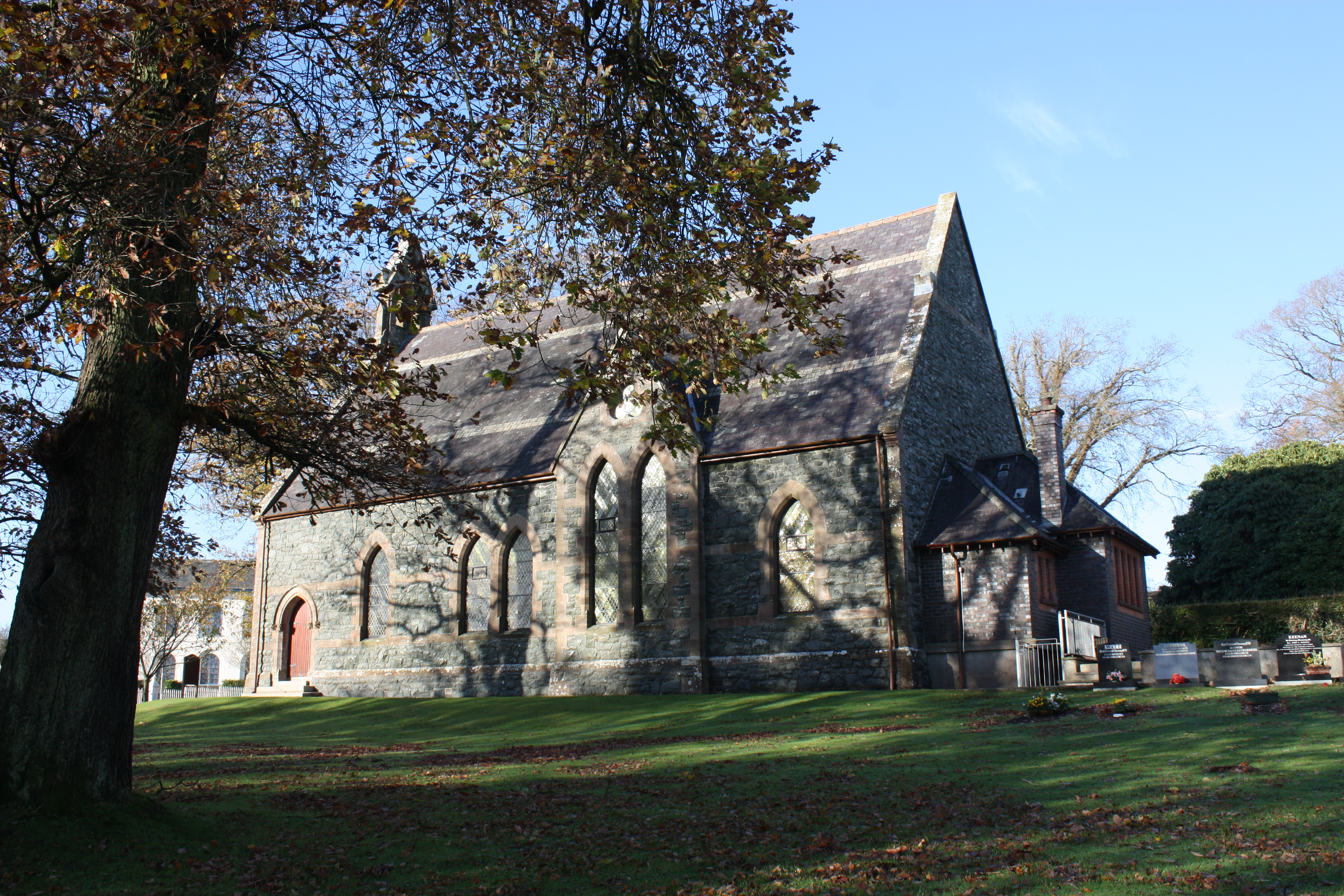
Spa Presbyterian Church, November 2010

Spa is a small village in County Down, Northern Ireland, close to Ballynahinch. It is situated in the Down District Council area.

Spa also has a small primary school which, in recent years, has had to expand to accommodate the increasing number of pupils resulting from the development of the new housing estates. It also has an Orange Hall. There is a lake just outside the village.

== History ==
Spa was found to have a mineral spring sometime in the late 17th century. In 1810 two pumps were put in by David Ker, local landlord and owner of the nearby Montalto estate, and in 1840 Assembly Rooms (including a ballroom) were built by his son. There was also a hotel and a maze for visitors, who came by train to Ballynahinch and then to Spa by jaunting car. While operational in the 1920s, the wells and hotel closed later in the 20th century.

== Religion ==
Spa Presbyterian Church is situated at the main crossroads in the village. The church building was paid for by a wealthy merchant from Belfast, James Robert McQuiston, who had come to Spa to take the waters. It was designed by architects Young and Mackenzie of Belfast and the builder was John Russell of Newcastle. The foundation stone was laid in 1871 and the church opened in July 1872.

== See also ==
- List of villages in Northern Ireland
- List of towns in Northern Ireland
