= Capecastle =

Village in County Antrim, Northern Ireland

Coordinates: 55°09′57″N 6°17′44″W

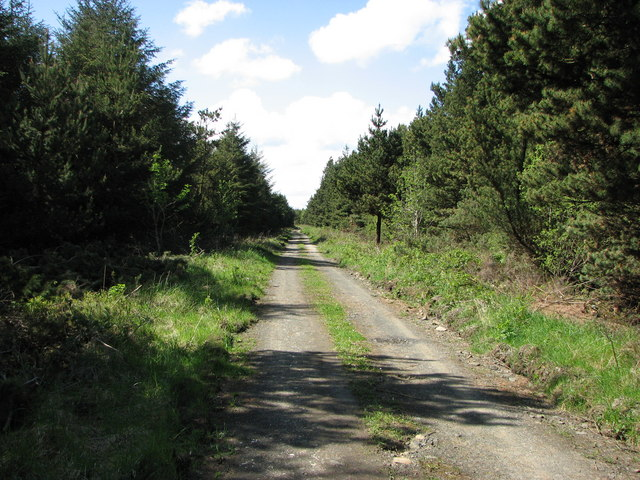
Capecastle Wood The forest track through the centre of Capecastle Wood.

Capecastle or Cape Castle is a small village and townland in County Antrim, Northern Ireland, between Armoy and Ballycastle. It is part of the Causeway Coast and Glens district.

== Transport ==
Capecastle railway station opened on 1 February 1882, closed for goods traffic in 1927, and finally closed altogether on 3 July 1950. It was on the Ballycastle Railway, a narrow gauge railway which ran for 17 miles connecting Ballycastle to Ballymoney, on the Belfast and Northern Counties Railway (BNCR), later Northern Counties Committee (NCC), main line to Derry.

Capecastle is served by buses running along the A44 Magheramore Road, with stops at the junction with Islandarragh Road.

== See also ==
- List of villages in Northern Ireland
