= Edenaveys =

Village in County Armagh, Northern Ireland

Coordinates: 54.347°N 6.619°W

Edenaveys (from Irish Éadan na bhFiach, meaning 'hill-brow of the ravens') is a small village and townland in County Armagh, Northern Ireland. It lies southeast of Armagh and is within the Armagh City and District Council area. Historically, it has been anglicized as Edenafeagh among other variations. It had a population of 190 people (80 households) in the 2011 Census. (2001 Census: 189 people)

== See also ==
- List of villages in Northern Ireland
