= Blackskull =

Village in County Down, Northern Ireland

Coordinates: 54.402865°N 6.240470°W

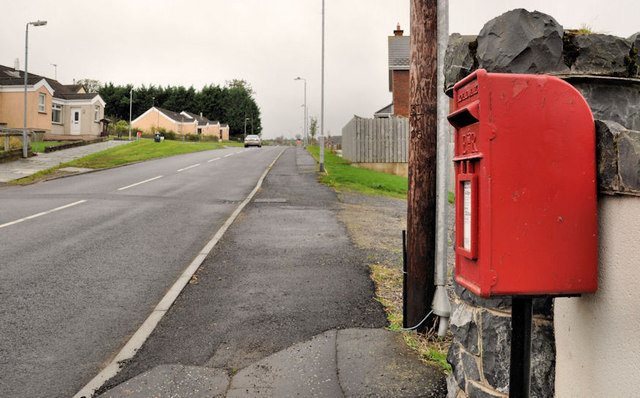
- Letter box on Blackskull Road

- Location within County Down
- Population: 421 (2021 census)
- Irish grid reference: J142519
  - Belfast: 22 miles
- District: Craigavon Borough
- County: County Down
- Country: Northern Ireland
- Sovereign state: United Kingdom
- Post town: DROMORE
- Postcode district: BT25
- Dialling code: 028
- UK Parliament: Upper Bann
- NI Assembly: Upper Bann

Blackskull is a small village in County Down, Northern Ireland. It lies near Donaghcloney and Dromore. In the 2021 census it had a population of 421 people. It is within the Craigavon Borough Council area.

The village is named after an old inn called the Black Skull, which had a picture of a black man's head on its sign. A grisly local tale tells how a black man was beheaded and his skull mounted above the door of the Inn. Formerly, the area was known as Ballygunaghan (from Irish Baile Uí Dhuinneagáin 'O'Donegan's settlement'), after the townland in which it lies.

== See also ==
- List of towns and villages in Northern Ireland
