= Ardgarvan =

Hamlet in County Londonderry, Northern Ireland

Ardgarvan Irish: Ard Garbháin
- townland

Irish transcription(s)
  - Derivation: Ard Garbháin
  - Meaning: "Garvan's height"
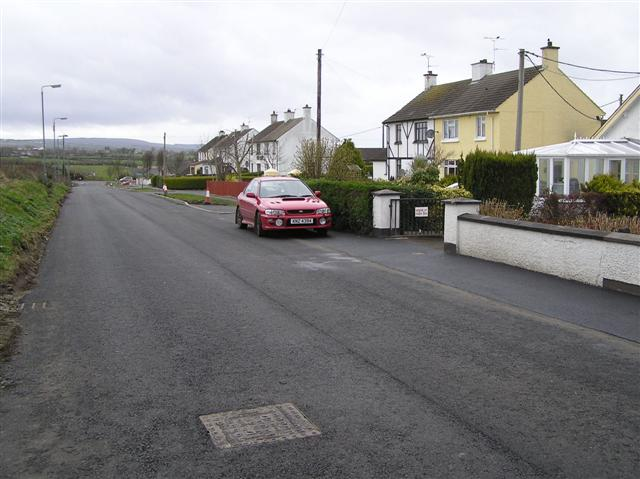
- Ardgarvan in 2008

- Ardgarvan shown within Northern Ireland Ardgarvan (the United Kingdom)
- Coordinates: 55°01′23″N 6°55′44″W
- Sovereign state: United Kingdom
- Country: Northern Ireland
- County: Londonderry
- Barony: Keenaght
- Civil parish: Drumcahose
- Settlements: Ardgarvan

Government
  - Council: Causeway Coast and Glens

Area
  - Total: 286.3 acres (115.85 ha)

Ardgarvan (from Irish Ard Garbháin, meaning 'Garvan's height') is a hamlet and townland in County Londonderry, Northern Ireland, 2 km south of Limavady. In the 2001 Census it had a population of 111 people. It is situated within Causeway Coast and Glens district.

The village has developed on the northern side of Ballyavelin Road and is dominated by public housing development. It has limited recreational facilities available to the local community.

== See also ==
- List of villages in Northern Ireland
- List of towns in Northern Ireland
