= Keshbridge =

Village in County Antrim, Northern Ireland

Coordinates: 54.479°N 6.115°W

Keshbridge (Irish: Droichead Ceis) is a small village in County Antrim, Northern Ireland. In the 2001 census it had a population of 99 people. It is situated in the Lisburn City Council area.

The Kesh House was built in the 19th century. Coal stores and weighbridges populate the town along an old coal canal.

== See also ==
- List of villages in Northern Ireland
- List of towns in Northern Ireland
