= Carrowclare =

Village in County Londonderry, Northern Ireland

- Village and townland
- Location within the United Kingdom
- Coordinates: 55°05′10″N 7°00′18″W
- Country: United Kingdom
- Division: Northern Ireland
- County: County Londonderry

Population (2001)
  - Total: 129

Carrowclare (from Irish Ceathramha Cláir 'level quarter') is a small village and townland in County Londonderry, Northern Ireland. In the 2001 Census it had a population of 129 people. It is situated within Causeway Coast and Glens district.

It is also the name of a townland in County Sligo, Republic of Ireland.

== See also ==
- List of villages in Northern Ireland
