= Balnamore =

Village in County Antrim, Northern Ireland

Coordinates: 55°04′N 6°33′W

Balnamore (from Irish Baile an Átha Mhóir, meaning 'homestead of the big ford') is a small village in County Antrim, Northern Ireland. It is within the townland of Ballynacree-Skein and lies 3 km west of Ballymoney. It is part Causeway Coast and Glens District Council. Historically it was known as Ballinamore. The local primary school is Balnamore Primary School.

== Transport ==
The village has road links to Ballymoney and Coleraine and public transport connections by bus to these two towns.

== Demography ==
Balnamore had a population of 900 people (342 households) in the 2011 census.

As of the 2001 census, Balnamore was classified as a "Small Village" by the Northern Ireland Statistics and Research Agency (NISRA) (i.e. with population between 500 and 1,000 people). On census day 2001, 29 April 2001, there were 661 people living in Balnamore. Of these:

- 22.4% were aged under 16 years and 16.5% were aged 60 and over
- 51.9% of the population were male and 48.1% were female
- 5.6% were from a Catholic background and 90.9% were from a Protestant background
- 3.3% of people aged 16–74 were unemployed

== See also ==
- List of towns and villages in Northern Ireland
