= Bendooragh =

Village in County Antrim, Northern Ireland

Coordinates: 55.048°N 6.551°W

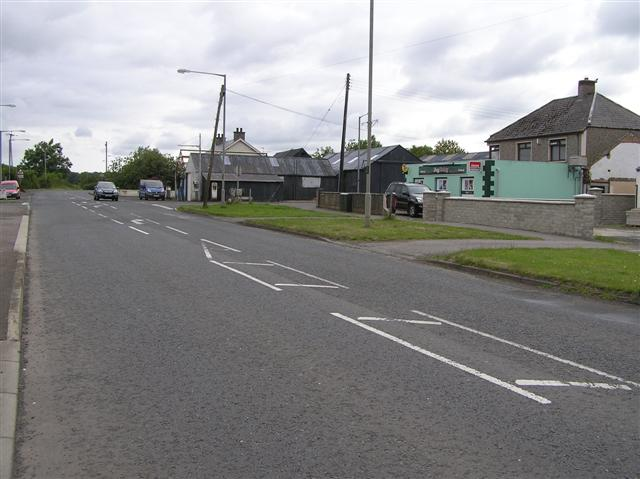
Road at Bendooragh

Bendooragh (from Irish Bun Dúraí, meaning 'bottomland of black soil') is a small village and townland in County Antrim, Northern Ireland, 2 1/2 miles (4.0 km) south west of Ballymoney. It is part of Causeway Coast and Glens District Council. It had a population of 622 people (217 households) in the 2011 census.

The village is located at the edge of the Ballymoney/Coleraine Green Belt and developed over the post-war period from a crossroads cluster at the junction of the Bann, Drumahiskey and Bendooragh Roads. The village stands near the site of Aenach Cross, the ancient capital of the Route. Bendooragh was the scene of a battle in 1642 where Irish rebels defeated a Government force under Archibald Stewart. During the 1950s public authority housing was built and in the past decade private housing has also been completed. An Orange Hall, an art gallery and cafe are located within the hamlet, and there is a church and church hall just outside on the Bann Road.The former Bendooragh National School still stands at the crossroads in the middle of the village. The local community association recently created a local history trail and published a book about the history of the village and hinterland.

== See also ==
- List of towns and villages in Northern Ireland
