= Lettershandoney =

Village in County Londonderry, Northern Ireland

Coordinates: 54.980°N 7.217°W

Lettershandoney: Irish: Leitir Seanduine
- Location within Northern Ireland
- District: Derry and Strabane
- County: County Londonderry
- Country: Northern Ireland
- Sovereign state: United Kingdom
- Postcode district: BT
- Dialling code: 028
- UK Parliament: Foyle
- NI Assembly: Foyle

Lettershandoney or Lettershendony (from Irish Leitir Seanduine, meaning 'hillside of the old people' or Leitir Seandomhnaigh meaning "hillside of the old church") is a small village and townland in County Londonderry, Northern Ireland, six miles to the southeast of Derry and three miles east of Drumahoe. In the 2001 census it had a population of 506 people. It is situated within Derry and Strabane district.

Lettershandoney has ten recorded spellings of its name, dating back to 1613.

In 2009 Lettershandoney and District Development Group carried out a community audit, highlighting the problems of the Lettershandoney Estate, the main housing area of the village, in terms of high unemployment, poverty and ill health, vandalism and alcohol and drug abuse, as well as lack of community facilities. In August 2011, a Lettershandoney Strategic Vision and Action Plan was produced by consultants on behalf of ARC (Assisting Rural Communities) north west. The resulting village plan aims to enhance community facilities and services, as well as environmental quality and transport, while protecting the character of the village. The village has some 150 houses and a primary school.

== See also ==
- List of villages in Northern Ireland
