= Carrickaness =

Village in County Armagh, Northern Ireland

Coordinates: 54.397°N 6.760°W

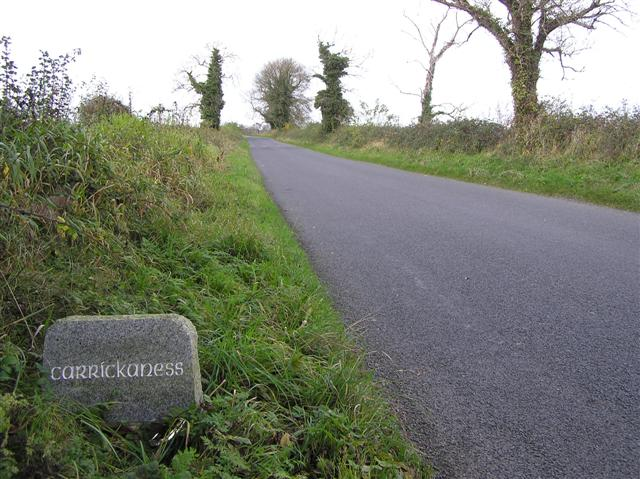
Road at Carrickaness

Carrickaness (from Irish Carraig an Easa, meaning 'rock of the waterfall') is a village and townland in County Armagh, Northern Ireland. In the 2021 Census it had a population of 110 people. It is within the Armagh City and District Council area.

== See also ==
- List of villages in Northern Ireland
