= Tullynawood =

Townland in County Armagh, Northern Ireland

Tullynawood is a small townland area in County Armagh, Northern Ireland close to the border with County Monaghan. It has a population of 17. It contains a fishing lake, Tullynawood Lake.
