= Magheraconluce =

Townland in County Down, Northern Ireland

Coordinates: 54°25′40″N 6°0′45″W

Magheraconluce: Irish: Machaire Cluana Lis
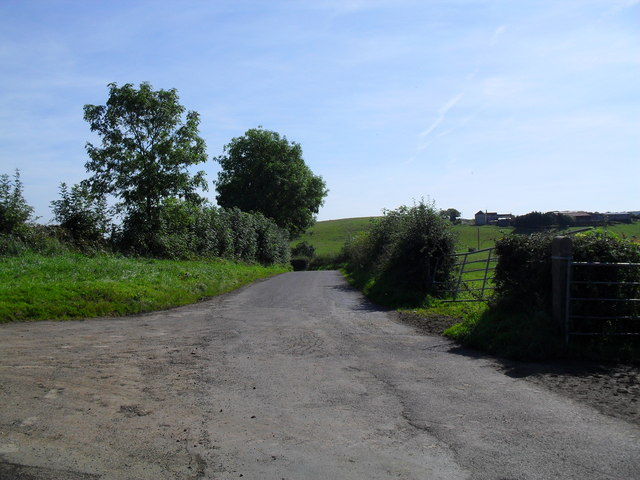
- Drumlough Road, Magheraconluce

- Location within Northern Ireland Location within County Down Magheraconluce (County Down)
- Population: 412 (2021 census)
- Irish grid reference: J 29097 55003
- District: Newry, Mourne and Down
- County: County Down
- Country: Northern Ireland
- Sovereign state: United Kingdom
- Post town: DOWNPATRICK
- Postcode district: BT30
- Dialling code: 028
- UK Parliament: South Down
- NI Assembly: South Down

Magheraconluce is a townland and small village in the civil parish of Annahilt, situated in the barony of Iveagh Lower, Lower Half, in County Down, Northern Ireland. It lies west of the village of Annahilt and is part of the Newry, Mourne and Down district and covers approximately 2.3 km^{2} (568.62 acres). It is within the Lisburn City Council area. The name derives from the Irish Machaire Cluana Lios, meaning "plain of the meadow of the ringfort".

== History ==
Magheraconluce is situated on low-lying ground, bordered by streams to the north and south. Historical spellings of the name, particularly among the Kilwarlin lands, often appear as two words, such as Ballimagher Clonlishe in 1585. However, forms like Maghereclonelish alias Ballemaghereclonelish recorded in 1632 indicate that the name was intended as a single compound. Although the spelling Maghereconlish appears around 1659, variants such as -clonluse persisted into the early 19th century. Linguistic analysis suggests that the letter l in the Irish word cluain (meaning "water-meadow") may have been lost through haplology. There is currently no archaeological evidence of a ringfort within the townland.

Magheraconluce lies within the historical sphere of influence of the Clandeboye O’Neills, whose lands were held by Con O’Neill in the early 17th century. Following Con O’Neill’s imprisonment for rebellion in 1602, his wife negotiated a pardon in exchange for land, leading to the division of his estate among Hugh Montgomery and James Hamilton. This private settlement, formalised in 1606, became a precursor to the Plantation of Ulster and brought significant Scottish migration to County Down. While Magheraconluce is not explicitly named in surviving estate records, its proximity to Drumbeg, Ballymacarrett, and Comber areas known to have been part of the Hamilton and Montgomery grants suggests it was likely included in their extended holdings or under their influence. The townland was later leased to William Cairns in 1716, marking the beginning of the Cairns family's long association with the area.

== Gallery ==
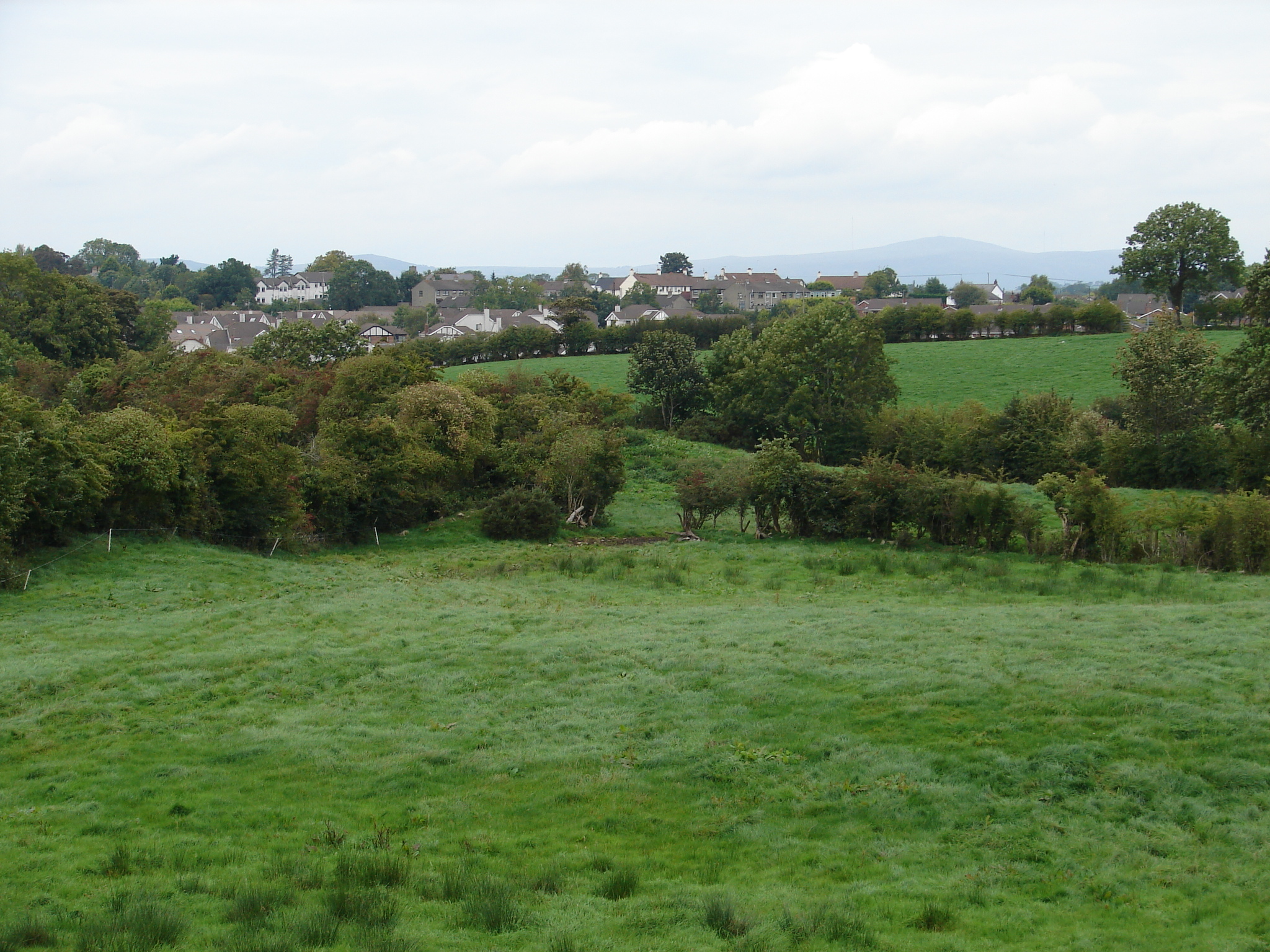
Annahilt from the south

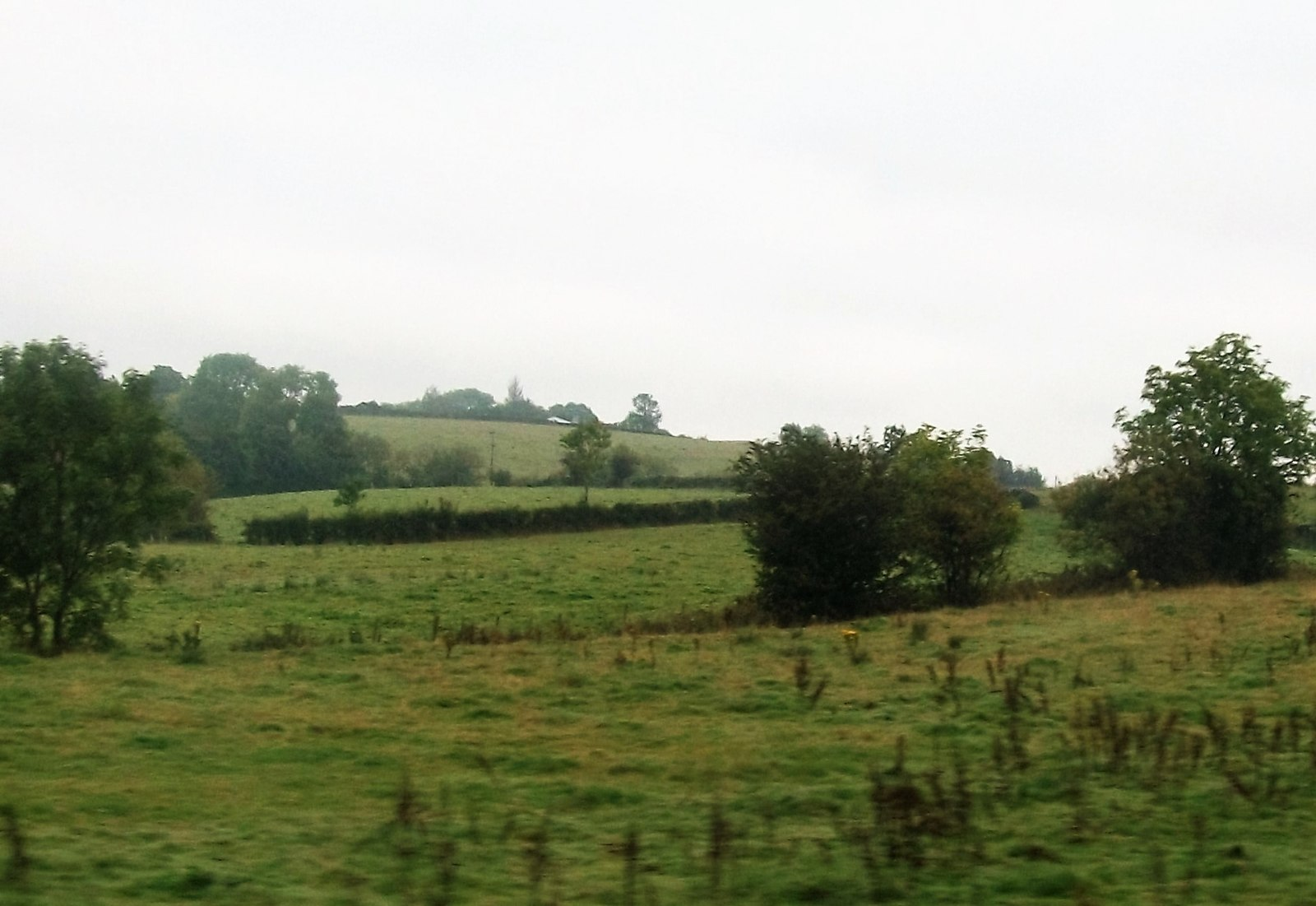
Grazing land alongside Magheraconluce Road

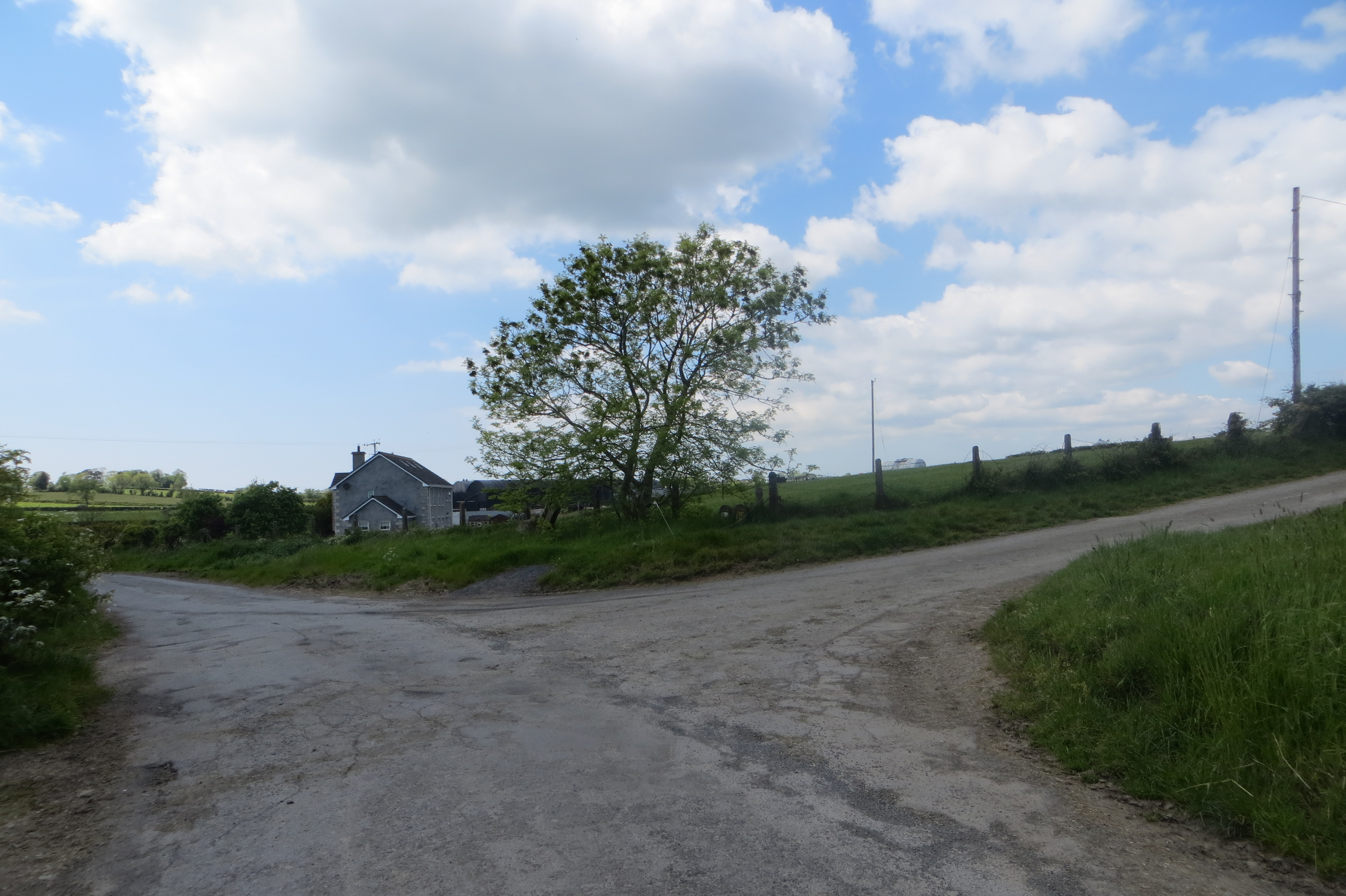
Road Junction, Magheraconluce

== Geography ==
Townlands that border Magheraconluce include:

- Ballycrune to the east
- Ballylintagh to the north
- Cargygray to the east
- Cluntagh to the east
- Drumlough to the west
- Growell to the south
