= Shanvey =

Village in County Londonderry, Northern Ireland

Coordinates: 55.074°N 6.931°W

Shanvey: Irish: Sean-bheith
- Location within Northern Ireland
- District: Causeway Coast and Glens
- County: County Londonderry
- Country: Northern Ireland
- Sovereign state: United Kingdom
- Post town: LONDONDERRY
- Postcode district: BT
- Dialling code: 028, +44 28
- Police: Northern Ireland
- Fire: Northern Ireland
- Ambulance: Northern Ireland
- UK Parliament: East Londonderry
- NI Assembly: East Londonderry

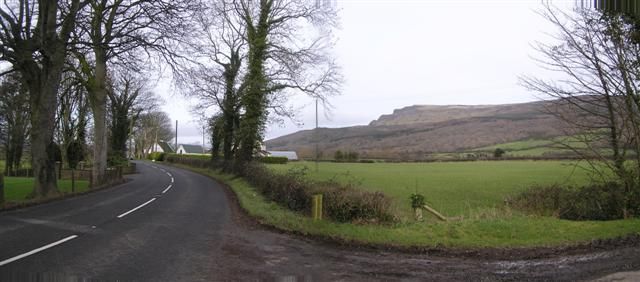

Shanvey (from Irish Sean-bheith, meaning 'old birch') is a small village and townland in County Londonderry, Northern Ireland. It lies about 6 kilometres (3.7 mi) north of Limavady on Aghanloo Road, the A2 coastal route between Limavady and Coleraine. It is designated as a hamlet and is situated within Causeway Coast and Glens district and in the former North Londonderry Area of Outstanding Natural Beauty, now redesignated as the Binevenagh Area of Outstanding Natural Beauty (AONB).

== See also ==
- List of villages in Northern Ireland
