= Broomhill, County Armagh =

Village in County Armagh, Northern Ireland

Coordinates: 54.391°N 6.514°W

Broomhill is a small village in County Armagh, Northern Ireland. It is within the townland of Drumnahunshin (from Irish Druim na hUinseann, meaning 'ridge of the ash') and the Armagh City and District Council area. It had a population of 197 people (91 households) in the 2011 Census. (2001 Census: 213 people)

Broomhill's development would have been gradual, likely tied to agricultural activities, land division, and settlements that occurred over many centuries. In Ireland, many such places grew up around rural communities, estates, or were established as part of land grants or developments during various periods, such as the Plantation of Ulster in the 17th century.

== See also ==
- List of towns and villages in Northern Ireland
