= Monteith, County Down =

Village in County Down, Northern Ireland

Coordinates: 54.281°N 6.170°W

Monteith (from Irish Móin Taobh, meaning 'bogside') is a small village in County Down, Northern Ireland. In the 2001 Census it had a population of 126 people. It lies within the Banbridge District area.

== See also ==
- List of villages in Northern Ireland
- List of towns in Northern Ireland
