= Roughfort =

Village in County Antrim, Northern Ireland

Coordinates: 54.686°N 6.030°W

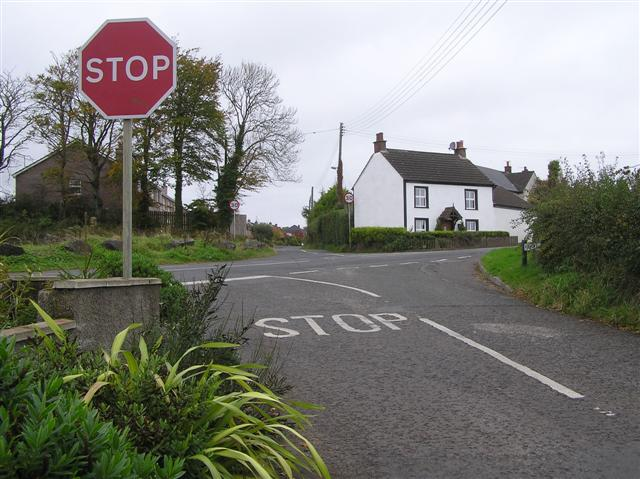
Roughfort Road

Roughfort is a small village in County Antrim, Northern Ireland. It is within the townland of Craigarogan and the Newtownabbey Borough Council area. As of the 2001 census, Roughfort had a population of 216 people.

== See also ==
- List of towns and villages in Northern Ireland
