= Goshedan =

Hamlet in County Londonderry, Northern Ireland

- hamlet, townland
- Location within the United Kingdom
- Coordinates: 54.936°N 7.234°W

Goshedan (from Irish Geosadán, meaning '(place of) thistle') is a hamlet and townland in County Londonderry, Northern Ireland. In the 2001 census it had a population of 90 people. It is situated within the Derry and Strabane district.

Goshedan is situated astride the Ardmore Road close to the River Faughan some 9 kilometres from the city. It originally comprised 2 public authority housing estates. The northern part of the settlement lies within the proposed Area of High Scenic Value along the Faughan valley.
