= Craigarogan =

Village in County Antrim, Northern Ireland

Coordinates: 54.67998°N 6.03089°W

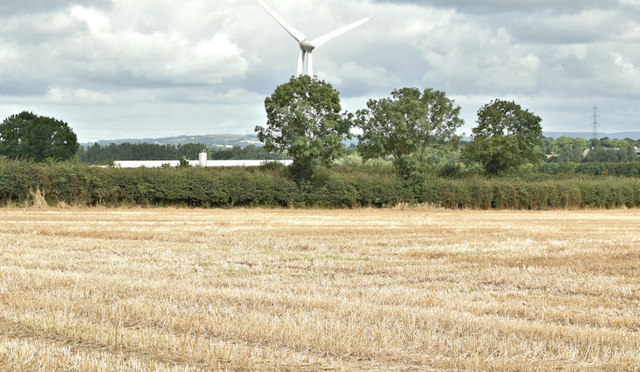
Countryside at Craigarogan

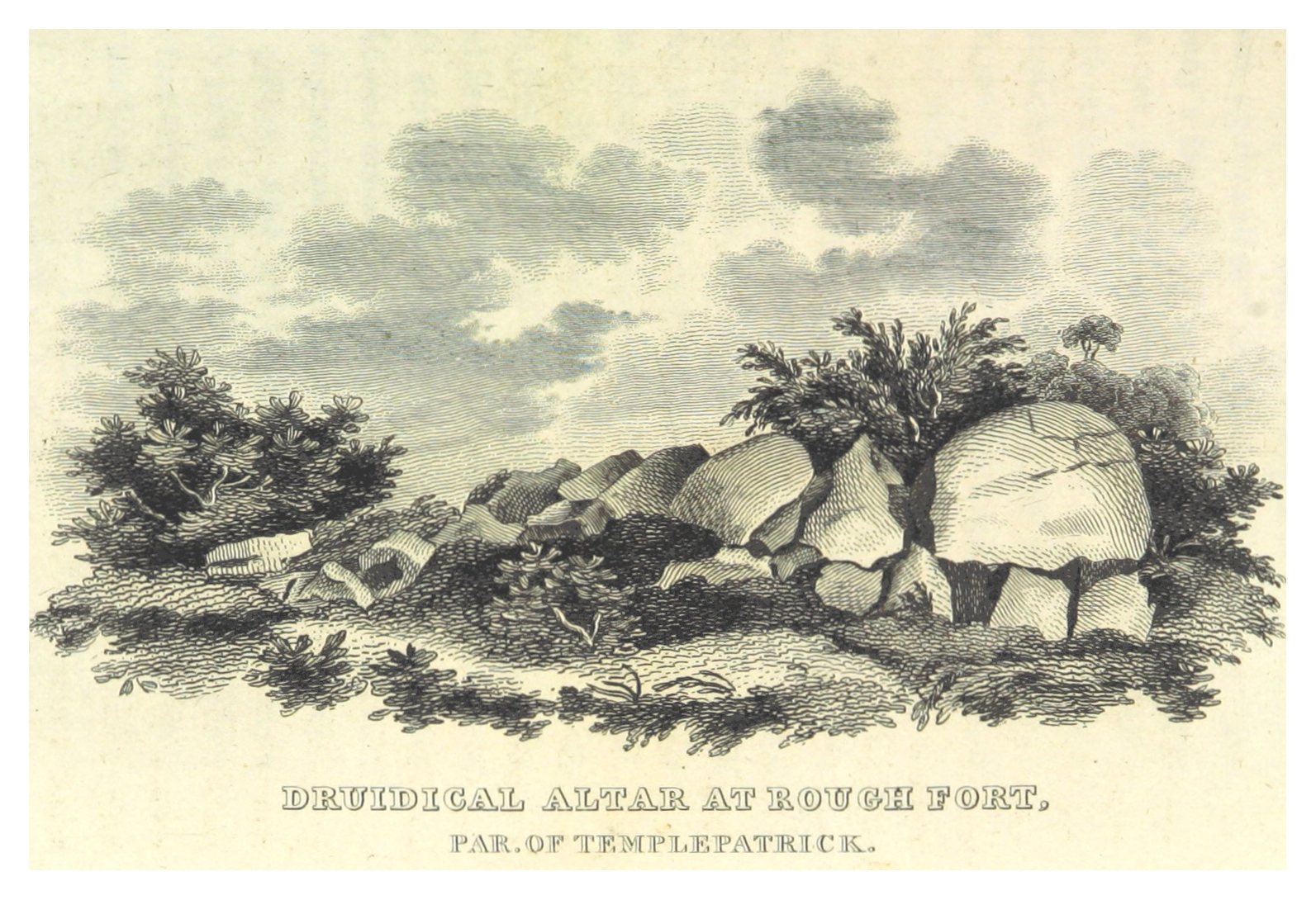
The gallery grave at Craigarogan

Craigarogan (from Irish Carraig Uí Ruagain, meaning 'Ó Ruagain's rock') is a small village, electoral division and townland to the west of Newtownabbey in County Antrim, Northern Ireland. The settlement has developed at the junction of the Bernice Road and the Clarke Lodge Road. The settlement of Roughfort is also within the townland. In the 2001 census it had a population of 69 people. It is part of Antrim and Newtownabbey district.

Craigarogan chamber tomb or passage grave (in Irish: Carn Greine, i.e. Cairn of the Sun) is located in the area. Locally it is pronounced as Carngraney and as a result sometimes called Granny's Grave (which is also a corruption of Grania's Grave). (OS map ref: J270842).
