= Glenone =

Village in County Londonderry, Northern Ireland

- Village and townland
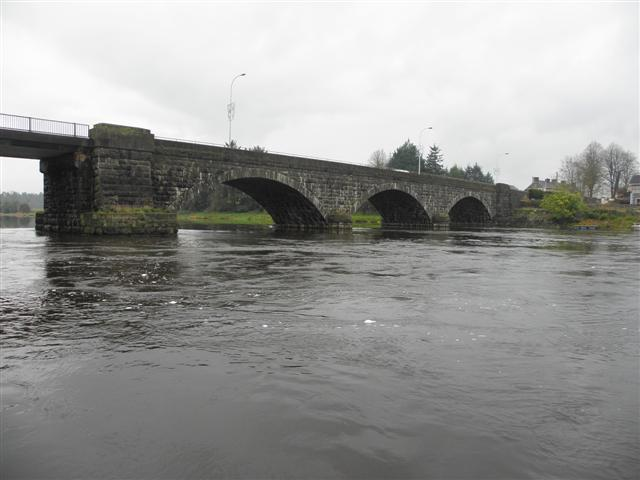
- Bridge over the Bann to Glenone from Portglenone

- Location within Northern Ireland
- Coordinates: 54°52′20″N 6°29′09″W

Glenone (from Irish Cluain Eoghain, meaning 'Eoghan's meadow') is a small village and townland in County Londonderry, Northern Ireland. In the 2001 Census it had a population of 318. It is situated within Mid-Ulster district.

Portglenone lies a short distance across the Lower River Bann (to the east) and Inishrush is a short distance to the west.
