= Largy =

Hamlet in County Londonderry, Northern Ireland

- hamlet, townland
- Coordinates: 54.996°N 6.943°W

Largy (from Irish Leargaidh, meaning 'hillside') is a small hamlet and townland in County Londonderry, Northern Ireland. It is 5 km south of Limavady, beside the B192 Limavady to Dungiven road. In 1991, its population was 90 but in the 2001 Census this had risen to 144. It is situated within Causeway Coast and Glens district.
