= Killywool =

Village in County Londonderry, Northern Ireland

- Townland
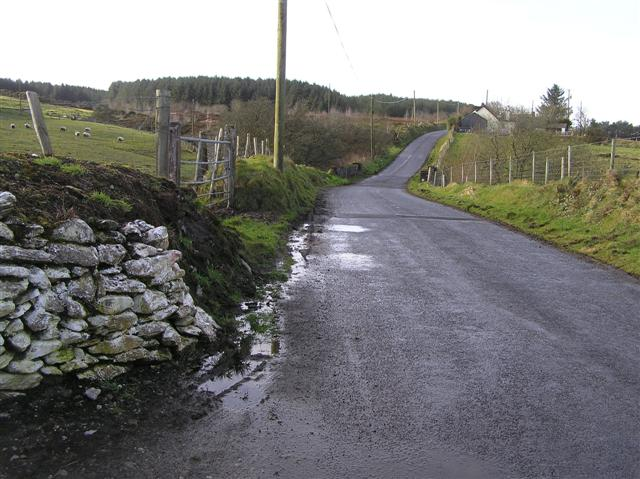
- The main motorway into Killywool

- Location within Northern Ireland
- Coordinates: 55.013°N 7.103°W

Population
  - Total: 640
- Demonym: Killywudlian

Killywool (possibly from Irish Coille-ghuail, meaning 'wood of the charcoal') is a townland in County Londonderry, Northern Ireland. In the 2021 Census Killywool and the surrounding area had a population of 640 people. It is situated within Causeway Coast and Glens district.

== History ==
The earliest recorded reference to Killywool dates back to the 12th century, during the Norman conquest of Ireland. While the rest of the Ireland fell victim to the incursion, Killywool proudly declared itself champion of Ireland due to its strategic position, a major contributing factor in the Killywudlian victory during the Battle of Coolagh Road.

It is widely accepted that Killywool because of its close proximity to Lough Foyle and the Atlantic Ocean became an important trading hub in the late 1500's. Emperor Wanli of the Ming Dynasty on hearing of the many riches to be had in Killywool sent merchants to the north of Ireland and the Killywool-Ming trade treaty was signed in 1588. Many merchants settled in the area and the local Killywudlian dialect to this day contains many Mandarin references.

== Environment ==
Because of Killywool's unique location and many bio diverse habitats, a new province wide centre for environmental protection is based in the townland.

The Northern Ireland Pollution Protection Liability Enterprise was founded to encourage better management and education within the agricultural industry which makes up a significant part of the Northern Ireland economy. Established in 2023, the Enterprise's core ethos is the management and protection of endangered habitats and species across the province.

== Mythology ==
Legend has it that St. Patrick drove all the snakes out of Ireland but local mythology suggests that a small population remained in what has now become known as Serpent Valley, just off Lime Road. Every year on St Patrick's Day (17 March) locals gather in the valley armed with musical instruments to try and charm the remaining snakes out from their lair and rid the island of the heinous reptiles once and for all.
