= Drumraighland =

Village in County Londonderry, Northern Ireland

- village, townland
- Coordinates: 55.024°N 6.963°W

Drumraighland (from Irish Druim Raithleann, meaning 'ridge of the level field') is a small village and townland in County Londonderry, Northern Ireland. In the 2001 Census it had a population of 69 people. It lies within Causeway Coast and Glens district. It was also formerly known as Drumraighlin.
