= Tartaraghan =

Village in County Armagh, Northern Ireland

- village, civil parish
- Location within the United Kingdom
- Coordinates: 54.478°N 6.551°W

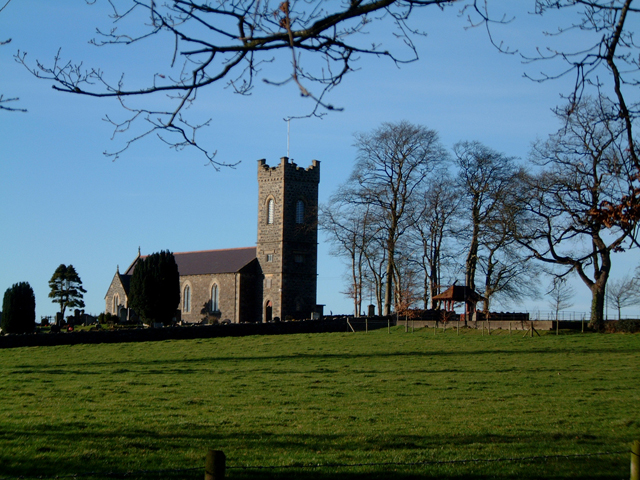
Tartaraghan Church of Ireland

Tartaraghan is a small village and civil parish in County Armagh, Northern Ireland. In the 2001 Census it had a population of 90 people. It is within Craigavon Borough Council area. Tartaraghan is also the name of the parish of which the village is part. The name was formerly spelt Taghterraghan and is thought to come from Irish Teach Tíreacháin, meaning 'Tíreachán's house'. However, the origin Tart Aracháin (meaning "Arachán's spot") has also been put forth.

== See also ==
- List of civil parishes of County Armagh
