= Portbraddon =

Hamlet in County Antrim, Northern Ireland

Coordinates: 55.235°N 6.416°W

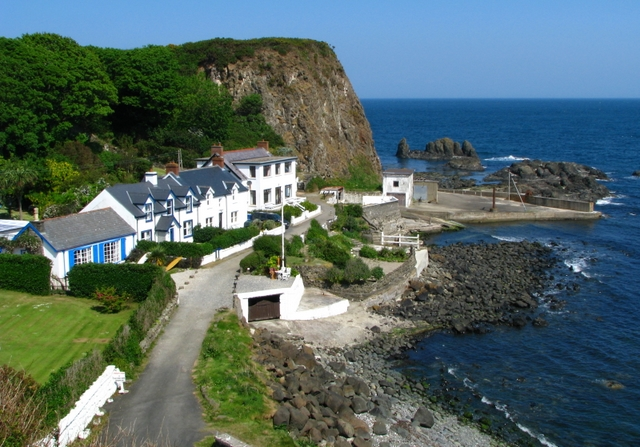
The harbour

Portbraddon or Portbraddan (from Irish Port Bradán, meaning 'port of the salmon') is a hamlet in County Antrim, Northern Ireland. The hamlet has an ancient salmon fishing station. A popular saying states that Portbraddon contained the smallest church in Ireland. The building in question was constructed in the 1950s as a cow byre, which the government listed without prior research. The church, which was named after St. Gobban, and measured 11 feet 4 inches (3.45 m) long, 6 feet 9 inches (2.06 m) wide, was demolished in 2017 by the new owner.

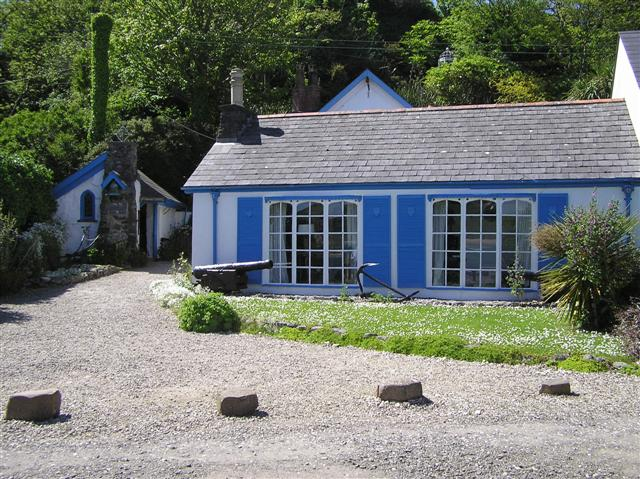
St. Gobban's Chapel, which was considered by many the smallest church in Ireland until 2017, can be seen on the left.
