= Drumlough, Hillsborough =

Village in County Down, Northern Ireland

Coordinates: 54.430°N 6.037°W

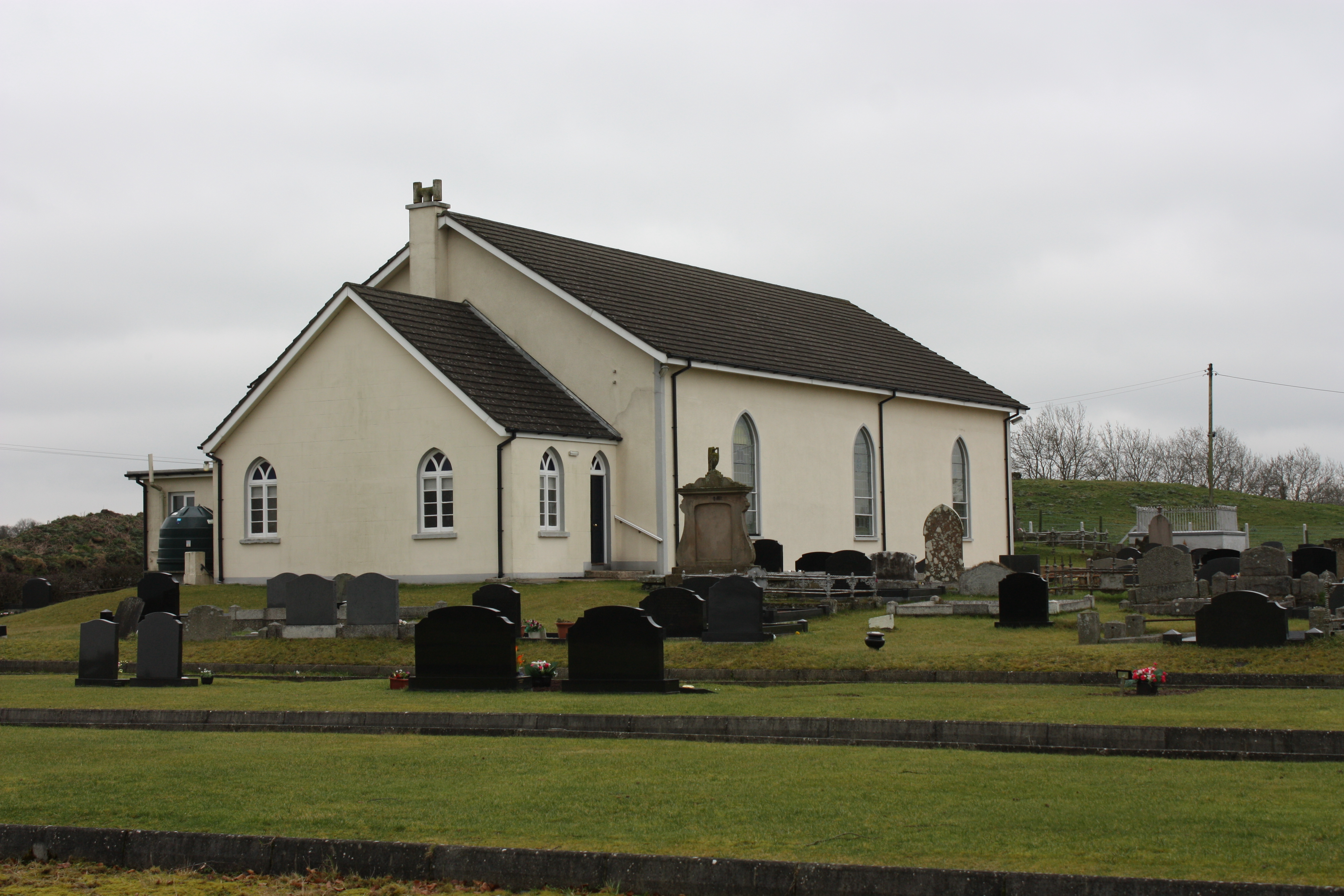
Drumlough Presbyterian Church

Drumlough (Irish: Druim Loch) is a village and townland in County Down, Northern Ireland, south of Hillsborough and east of Dromore. In the 2001 Census it had a population of 96 people. It is situated in the Lisburn City Council area. Locally significant buildings include Drumlough Presbyterian Church and manse, Rose Cottage (pre 1830), and an Orange Hall built in 1907.

Drumlough Pipe Band was formed in 1950 and competes in competitions organised by the Royal Scottish Pipe Band Association.

== Sources ==
- NI Neighbourhood Information System
- Draft Belfast Metropolitan Area Plan 2015

== See also ==
- List of villages in Northern Ireland
- List of towns in Northern Ireland
