= List of townlands of County Londonderry =

In Ireland, counties are divided into civil parishes, and these parishes are further divided into townlands. The following is a list of townlands sorted by parish in County Londonderry, Northern Ireland:

== Parishes ==
=== Aghadowey ===
Townland	Irish Origin (if applicable)	Meaning
Aghadowey	Achadh Dubhthaigh	Duffy's field
Ardreagh	Ard Riabhach	grey height
Ballinrees	Baile an Fhraoigh or Baile an Righ or Baile an Reisidhe	homestead of the heather or king's town or town of the reciter
Ballybritain	Baile Bhriotáin	homestead of Britain
Ballycaghan	Baile (Mhic) Eachaidh	homestead of Caghan
Ballyclough	Baile Clog or Cloch	homestead of the bell or stone
Ballydevitt	Baile (Mhic) Daibhéid	homestead of Devitt
Ballygawley	Baile Uí Dhálaigh	Ó Dálaigh's homestead
Ballylintagh	An Baile Linnteach	homestead of pools
Ballymenagh	Baile Meadhonach	middle town
Ballynacally More	Baile na Caillí Mór	big homestead of the hags/nuns
Ballywillin	Baile Muileann	homestead of the mill
Bovagh		
Caheny	Caitheanaigh	place of winnowing chaff
Carnrallagh	Carn Ralach	Cairn of the oak-tree
Carranroe	Corran Rua	red corner (or sickle shape)
Clagan	Cloigeann	the skull (a round hill)
Clarehill	Clár Coill	level wood
Clintagh	Cluain Teach	meadow-land house
Collins	Coileain	O'Collins
Coolhill	Cúil Coill	back-wood
Cornamuclagh	Corr na Muclach	round hill of the pig-styes
Craiglea Glebe	Creag Uí Lí or Creag Liath	rock of the Fir Lí or grey rock
Craigmore	Creag Mór	big crag
Crevolea	Craobh Uí Lí or Craobh Liath	(family) branch of the Fir Lí or grey branchy tree
Crosscanley Glebe	Crois Cineál Lí or Crois Cinn Liath	cross of the race of the Fir Lí or cross of the grey head
Crossmakeever	Cros (Mhic) Íomhair	McKeever's cross
Culdrum	Cúil droim	back of the ridge
Cullycapple	Coilleach gCapall	woodland of the horses
Cullyramer	Coilleach Reamhar	thick wood
Dernagross	Doire na gCrois	oakwood of the cross
Droghed	Droichead	bridge
Drumacrow	Droim na Cruach	ridge of the ricks
Drumeil	Droim Mile or Droim Eillidhe	ridge of soldiers or Elly's ridge
Drumsteeple	Droim + Steeple (English) or Droim Stábla	steeple ridge or ridge of the stable
Glenbuck	Gleann Buic	glen of the buck (stag)
Glencurb	Clann Corb or Gleann Corb	clan of Corb or glen of wickedness
Glenkeen	Gleann Caoin	pleasant glen
Gorran	Garran	shrubbery
Gortin Coolhill	Goirtín Cúil Choil	little tilled field, back-field
Gortin Mayoghill	Goirtín Má Ghuala	little tilled field, plain of the shoulder
Keely	Chaolaigh	slender rod/sticks
Killeague	Coill Liag or Cill Éig	wood of the stone or church of death
Killykergan	Coill Uí Chiaragáin	O'Kerrigan's wood
Kiltest	Cill/Coill Teiste	church/wood of the testimony (witness)
Knockaduff	Cnoc na Dubh	black hill
Landmore	Lann Mór	big church
Lisboy	Lios Buí	yellow fort
Lisnamuck	Lios na Muc	fort of the pigs
Managher	Bheannchar or Manach ár	hilly land or monk's tillage
Mayboy	Maigh Buí	yellow plain
Mayoghill	Maigh Eochaill	plain of the yew-wood
Meavemanougher	Meabh Bheannchar	Meave's hilly land
Meencraig	Mín Creag	smooth crag
Menagh	Meánach	middle land
Moneybrannon	Muine Breannain	Brennan's thicket/shrubbery
Moneycarrie Lower	Móin na Caraidh	bog of the weir
Mullaghinch	Mullach Inis	water-meadow/island summit
Mullan	An Mullán	little summit
Mullinabrone	Mullach na Bron	summit of the quern (stone-mill)
Risk	Riasg	marsh
Rusky	Rúscaigh	morass (a mire/marsh)
Scalty	Scoilte	rock split/cleft
Seygorry	Suidhe Guaire	seat of St. Guaire
Shanlongford	Sean Longphort	old fortified house
Tamlaght	Tamhlacht	plague burial place

=== Aghanloo ===
Townland	Irish Origin (if applicable)	Meaning
Artikelly	Ard Tighe (Uí) Cheallaigh	height of (O')Kelly's house
Ballybrisell	Baile Bhreasail	Bresails homestead
Ballycarton	Baile Ceartan or (Mhic) Cairthainn	homestead of the forge or Mhic Cairthainn's homestead
Ballycastle	Baile + castle	Castle homestead
Ballyhanna	Baile (Uí) hAnnaidh	(O')Hanna's homestead
Ballyhenry East	Baile (Mhic) Éinrí (O'Cahan sept variant)	Henry's homstead
Ballymaglin	Baile Mhic Fhloinn	McFlynn's homestead
Ballymoney	Baile Muine or Monaidh	homestead of the thicket or bog
Carbullion	Possibly Corr Cuilleann or Cuileann	round hill of the steep unbroken slope or holly
Clooney	Chluanaidh	meadow
Cressy Crib	Possibly Scotch-Gaelic Crosach Crib	Holiday home crossing
Dirtagh	Dair Teach	oak wood house
Dowland	Dow + Land	Land of value
Drumaderry	Droim na Daire	ridge of the oak-grove
Drumalief	Droim Amhlaoibh	Auliffe's (Olaf's) ridge
Drumbane	Droim Bán	white ridge
Freehall (Moneyvennon)	Muine Bheanain	St. Benan's thicket
Glebe		
Gortnamoney	Gort na Móna	field of the bog
Grange Park		
Grannagh Ardnargle	Granach + Ard na Aireagal	gravely + high oratory/habitation/small church
Killybready	Choillidh Brighde	Brigid's wood
Largantea	Leargain Tighe	hill-slope house
Lisnagrib	Lios na Grib	fort of the quick
Magheraskeagh	Machaire Sceach	plain of thornes
Rathfad	Ráth ??	fort ??
Shanvey	Sean Bheith	old birch tree
Stradreagh	tSráid Riabhach	grey/fallow single-street village
Tircorran	Tir Corráin	Curran's land
Tullyarmon	Tulach hArmainn	Harmon's hillock

=== Agivey ===
Townland	Irish Origin (if applicable)	Meaning
Culcrow	Cúl/Cúil Cruach	corner/back of ricks
Glasgort	Glas Gort	green field
Landagivey	Lann Áth Geimhe	church of the ford of roaring water
Lissaghmore	Lios Mór	great fort
Mullaghmore	Mullach Mór	big summit
Mullaghmore Glebe	Mullach Mór	big summit
Ree	Riabhac	grey lands

=== Ardboe (County Londonderry portion) ===
Townland	Irish Origin (if applicable)	Meaning
Annahavil	Eanach Abhaill	marsh of the orchard
Ballygonny More	Baile gConaidh Mór	homestead of fire-wood
Drummullan	Droim Muilinn	Mullan's ridge/ridge of the little summit
Moneyhaw	Muine hDith	brake of the ford

=== Artrea (County Londonderry portion) ===
Townland	Irish Origin (if applicable)	Meaning
Aughrim	Eachdhroim	horse-ridge
Ballindrum	Baile an Droim	homestead of the ridge
Ballydawley (Crosspatrick)	Baile (Uí) Dalaigh	homestead of Daly
Ballyeglish	Baile Eaglais	church homestead
Ballygillen More	Baile (Ui) Ghilin Mór	big homestead of O'Gillen
Ballygruby	Baile gRiabach or Baile Grúibe	fallow homestead or Gruby's homestead
Ballygurk	Baile (Mhic) Oirc	homestead of McGurk
Ballymaguigan	Baile Mhic Ghuigín	MacGuigan's homestead
Ballymulderg More	Baile (Uí) Maoildeirg Mór	big homestead of O'Mulderg
Ballymulligan	Baile Uí Mhaoileagáin	O'Mulligan's homestead
Ballynagarve	Baile na Gairbhe	homestead of the rough land
Ballyneill More	Baile Uí Néill Mór	big homestead of O'Neill
Ballynenagh	Baile an Aenach or Eanach	homstead of the (cattle) fair or marsh
Ballynewy	Baile Fhiodhbhaidhe or Baile Nua	homestead of wood or new town
Ballyriff	Baile Ruibhe	homestead of the rue/brimstone
Ballyrogully	Baile Rua gCaille	homestead of red wood
Ballyronan More	Baile Uí Rónáin Mor	Ronan's big homestead
Carraloan (Glebe)	Ceathrú Luan	quarter of the lambs
Creagh (Etre and Otre)	Créach	the coarse pasture
Derrygarve	Doire Garbh	rough oakwood
Doluskey	Dubh Loisgthe	black burnt land
Drumenagh	Droim Aenach	ridge of the (cattle) fair
Lisnamorrow	Lios na Marbh	fort of the dead
Maghadone	Machaire Donn or Machaire Dún	brown plain or plain of the fort
Mawillian	Má Mhuilinn	plain of the mill
Moneymore	Muine Mór	big thicket
Tralee	Tráigh Lía	grey strand

=== Ballinderry ===
Townland	Irish Origin (if applicable)	Meaning
Ardagh	Árd Achadh	high field
Ballinderry	Baile an Doire	homestead of the oakwood
Ballydonnell	Baile (Ui) Dhomhnaill	O'Donnell's homestead
Ballylifford	Baile Leifear	homestead by side of the water
Ballymultrea	Baile (Uí) Maoltrea	homestead of O'Multrea
Ballyronan Beg	Baile (Uí) Rónáin Bheag	Ronan's little homestead
Belagherty	Baile Uí Fhachartaigh	homestead of O'Faherty
Killymuck	Coill na Muc	wood of the pigs

=== Ballyaghran ===
Townland	Irish Origin (if applicable)	Meaning
Ballygallin		
Ballygelagh East		
Ballygelagh West		
Ballyleese South		
Ballysally		
Bellemont North		
Broad Isle		
Cappagh More		
Carnalbanagh		
Carnanee		
Craigtown Beg		
Crossreagh East		
Crossreagh West		
Dooey Beg		
Drumslade		
Dundooan		
Galvally		
Garborgle		
Garrylaban		
Glebe		
Island-Tasserty		
Island-Vardin		
Isle of Benoney		
Kiltinny Beg		
Kiltinny More		
Little Ringan		
Maddybenny Beg		
Magheraclay		
Mullaghacall North		
Nare		
Roselick Beg		
Tullaghmurry East		

=== Ballymoney (County Londonderry portion) ===
Townland	Irish Origin (if applicable)	Meaning
Ballygan Upper	Baile gCeann or Liagain	homestead of the heads or pillar-stone
Ballywindelland Lower	Baile Mhuine Dileann	homestead of the shrubbery of the flood
Ballywindelland Upper	Baile Mhuine Dileann	homestead of the shrubbery of the flood
Colebreene Lower	Cúl Bruidhne	corner/back of the fairy palace
Heagles	hEaglais	church
Macfinn Lower	Maigh Fionn	fair plain
Seacon Lower	Suidhe Conn	Conn's seat
Seacon More	Suidhe Conn Mór	big Conn's seat

=== Ballynascreen ===
Townland	Irish Origin (if applicable)	Meaning
Ballynure	Baile na nIúr (Iúir)	homestead of the yew trees
Bancran Glebe	An Beannchrán or Bán Chrán	a kind of palisaded enclosure or white-tree
Brackagh	An Bhreacach	speckled place
Cahore	Cathair	stone fort/enclosure (by extension monastery enclosure)
Carnamoney	Ceathrú na Móna or Carn na Monagh	quarterland of the bog or stone of the bog
Cavanreagh	Cabhán Riabhach	grey hollow/round hill
Cloane	Cluain	meadow
Cloughfin	Cloch Fionn	white stone
Coolnasillagh	Cúil na Saileach	corner (nook) of the sallow(s)
Corick	Comhrac	confluence
Derrynoyd	Doire an Fhóid	oakwood of the sod
Disert	Díseart	wilderness
Doon	Dún	fort
Drumard	Droim Ard	high ridge
Drumderg	Droim Dearg	red ridge
Dunlogan	Dún Leocháin or Dún Ghluagain	Logan's fort or fort of the monster toad
Dunmurry	Dún Múirígh	Murray's fort
Duntibryan	Dún Tí Bhriain	homestead of Bryan's fort
Finglen	Fionn Gleann	white valley
Glebe	An Ghléib	area of land granted to a clergyman as part of his benefice
Glengomna	Gleann Gamhna	valley of the calf
Glenviggan	Gleann Bhigín or Gleann Bheichcean	Bigin's valley or St. Beccan's valley
Gortnaskey	Gort na Sceach	field of hawthornes
Labby	An Leaba	the bed (as in grave)
Moneyconey	Móin an Chongna	bog of the antler
Moneyguiggy	Móin an Crithach or Móin na gCuigeadh	the shaking bog or bog of the fifths
Moneyneany	Móin na nIonadh	bog of the wonders
Moyard	Maigh Ard	high plain
Moydamlaght	Maigh dTamhlachta	plain of the plague-cemetery
Moyheeland	Maigh Chaoláin	plain of St. Caelan or plain of small-guts
Moykeeran	Maigh Chaorthainn	plain of the Rowan Tree
Mulnavoo	Mullán na hUamha	hillock of the cave (souterrain)
Owenreagh	An Abhainn Riabhach	the grey river
Straw	An tSrath	marsh
Straw Mountain	An tSrath	marsh
Strawmore	An tSrath Mór	large marsh
Tonaght	Tonnach	enclosure/mound
Tullybrick	Tulaigh Bhric	speckled hill

=== Ballyrashane (County Londonderry portion) ===
Townland	Irish Origin (if applicable)	Meaning
Articrunaght South	Ard Tighe Cruithneachta	height of the wheat house
Ballindreen Irish	Baile an Droighin	homestead of the thorn
Ballindreen Scotch	Baile an Droighin	homestead of the thorn
Ballynag Lower	Baile na gCag	homestead of the jackdaw
Ballynag Upper	Baile na gCag	homestead of the jackdaw
Ballyvelton Upper	Baile Bhealtaine	May homestead (or festival of Beltane)
Ballyversall	Baile Bhreasail	O'Bresil's homestead
Cloyfin South	Cloch Fionn or Cloidh Fionn	white stone or white paddock
Glebe	An Ghléib	area of land granted to a clergyman as part of his benefice
Gorticloghan	Gort a Chlochain	field/garden of the stony-ford
Island Effrick North		
Island Effrick South		
Kirkistown	Baile Circis	church town
Knocknakeeragh	Cnoc na gCaerach	hill of the sheep
Lisnagalt	Lios na Geilt	fort of the mad
Liswatty Lower	Lios Mhadaigh	dog fort
Liswatty Upper	Lios Mhadaigh	dog fort

=== Ballyscullion (County Londonderry portion) ===
Townland	Irish Origin (if applicable)	Meaning
Ballydermot	Baile Diarmuid	Dermot's homestead
Ballymacombs More	Baile MacComaidh Mór	McCombs big homestead
Ballynease Macpeake	Baile Naois	Naoise's homestead
Ballyscullion West	Baile Uí Scoillín	Scullion's homestead
Drumanee Lower	Droim an Fhiaidh	ridge of the deer
Edenreagh	Éadan Riabhach	grey/striped brow
Glebe West	An Ghléib Thiar	area of land (thiar, in the west) granted to a clergyman as part of his benefice
Glebe East	An Ghléib Thoir	area of land (thoir, in the east) granted to a clergyman as part of his benefice
Killyberry	Coill Uí Bhearaigh	O'Berry's wood
Killyberry Boyd	Coill Uí Bhearaigh	O'Berry's wood
Leitrim	Liath Droim	grey ridge
Mullaghboy	Mullach Buí	yellow summit
Old Town Deer Park		
Tamlaghtduff	Tamhlacht Dubh	black (plague) burial place
Tamniaran	Tamhnaigh Árainn	ridge of the cultivated spot

=== Ballywillin ===
Townland	Irish Origin (if applicable)	Meaning
Ballylagan North	Baile an Lagáin	homestead of the hollow
Ballylagan South	Baile an Lagáin	homestead of the hollow
Ballymaclevennon West		
Ballyreagh	Baile Riabhach	grey homestead
Ballywillin Bog	Baile Muileann	homestead of the mill
Carnaboy	Carn na Buídhe	the yellow cairn
Carnalridge	Possibly Carn Mhaoil Brígde	Mulbride's cairn
Cloyfin North	Cloch Fionn or Cloidh Fionn	white stone or white paddock
Corrstown	Personal name Corr + town	Corrs town
Craignahorn	Creag na hEorna	rock of the barley
Crossreagh	Crois Riabhach	grey cross
Glebe	An Ghléib	area of land granted to a clergyman as part of his benefice
Island Doo	Oileán Dubh	black island
Island Flackey		
Islandmore Lower	Oileán Mór	big island
Killygreen Lower	Choillidh Gréine	sunny wood
Killygreen Upper	Choillidh Gréine	sunny wood
Magheraboy	Machaire Buídhe	yellow plain
Magheramenagh	Machaire Meadhonach	middle plain
Slimag	Sliabh Maedhoig	(St.) Maug's mountain

=== Balteagh ===
Townland	Irish Origin (if applicable)	Meaning
Aghansillagh		
Ardmore	An tArd Mór	the great height
Ballyavelin South		
Ballyleagry		
Ballymully		
Carnet		
Cloghan		
Drumagosker		
Drumgavenny Lower		
Drumgesh		
Drumsurn Lower		
Edenmore		
Glebe	An Ghléib	area of land granted to a clergyman as part of his benefice
Gortnarney		
Kilhoyle		
Lislane		
Little Derry		
Maine North		
Moneyguiggy		
Smulgedon		
Temain		
Ternamuck		
Terrydoo Clyde		
Terrydremont North		

=== Banagher ===
Townland	Irish Origin (if applicable)	Meaning
Aughlish		
Ballydonegan	Baile Donagáin	Donegan's town
Ballyhanedin	Bealach an Éadan	road on the front of the hill
Carnanbane	Carnan Bán	little white cairn
Coolnamonan	Cúil na Móinan	hill of the little bog
Derrychrier	Doire Criathar	oak wood of the sieves
Drumcovit	Droim Cóbheacht	ridge of the cove
Feeny	Na Fíneadha	woody place
Fincarn	Fionn Carn	the white carn
Finglen	Fionn ghleann	the white valley/glen
Gallany	Geal Eananch	the white marsh
Glenedra	Gleann Eadar	central valley/glen
Killunaght	Coill Leamhnacht	wood of the new milk
Knockan	Cnócan	little hill
Maghermore	Machaire Mór	the great plain
Rallagh	Raileach	abounding in oak
Tamnyagan	Tamhnach Uí Agáin	O'Hagan's field
Teeavan	Taobh Abhainn	riverside/beside the river
Templemoyle	Teampall Maol	dilapidated church
Tirglassan	Tír Glasuaine	green fields
Umrycam	Iomaire Cam	crooked ridge

=== Bovevagh ===
Townland	Irish Origin (if applicable)	Meaning
Ardinarive		
Ballyharigan		
Ballymoney		
Bonnanaboigh		
Bovevagh		
Camnish		
Derryard		
Derrylane		
Derrynaflaw		
Derryork		
Drumadreen		
Drumaduff		
Drumneechy		
Farkland		
Flanders (Ulster-Scots: Flannèrs Toonlann)		
Formil		
Glebe	An Ghléib	area of land granted to a clergyman as part of his benefice
Glenconway		
Gortaclare		
Gortnahey Beg		
Gortnahey More		
Killibleught		
Leeke		
Muldonagh		
Straw		

=== Carrick ===
Townland	Irish Origin (if applicable)	Meaning
Ballydarrog	Baile Dearg	red homestead
Ballymore	Baile Mór	big homestead
Ballyquin	Bally Chuinn	Conn's homestead
Carrick	Carraig	rock
Carrick East	Carraig	rock
Largy	Leargaidh	hill-side
Moys	Maigh	plain
Mulkeeragh	Maol gCaerach	small hill of sheep
Templemoyle	Teampaill Maol	dilapidated/roofless temple
Terrydrum	Tir Dhá Droim	land of two ridges

=== Clondermot ===
Townland	Irish Origin (if applicable)	Meaning
Altnagelvin	Alt na nGealbhan	height of the sparrows
Ardkill		
Ardlough	Ard Loch	height of the lough
Ardmore		
Ardnabrocky	Ard na Brochaighe	height of the badgers (set)
Avish		
Ballyoan		
Ballyore		
Ballyshasky	Baile na Seascaigh	townland of sedge grass
Bogagh		
Bolies		
Brickkilns		
Carn		
Carnafarn		
Carrakeel		
Caw		
Clampernow		
Cloghore (Greerstown)		
Clondermot		
Clooney		
Coolkeeragh		
Corrody		
Craigtown		
Creevedonnell		
Cromkill		
Curryfree		
Currynierin		
Disertowen		
Drumagore		
Drumahoe		
Drumconan		
Dunhugh		
Edenreagh Beg		
Enagh		
Fincarn		
Glenderowen		
Glenkeen		
Gobnascale		
Gortgranagh		
Gortica		
Gorticross		
Gortin		
Gortinure		
Gortnessy		
Gortree		
Gransha		
Gransha (Intake)		
Kilfinnan		
Killymallaght		
Kittybane		
Knockbrack		
Lisaghmore (The Trench)		
Lisdillon		
Lisglass		
Lismacarol		
Lisnagelvin		
Lisneal		
Lissahawley		
Magheracanon		
Managh Beg		
Maydown		
Prehen		
Primity		
Rossnagalliagh		
Stradreagh Beg		
Tagharina		
Tamnymore		
Templetown		
Tirbracken		
Tirkeeveny		
Tully Lower		
Tully Upper		

=== Coleraine ===
Townland	Irish Origin (if applicable)	Meaning
Ballyartan		
Ballyclaber		
Bellasses		
Blagh		
Boghill		
Coleraine and Suburbs		
Cross Glebe		
Danes Hill		
Drumadragh		
Gateside		
Harpurs Hill		
Island Heaghey		
Knockantern		
Lodge		
Loguestown		
Loughan Hill		
Millburn		
Mount Sandel		
Spittle Hill		
Tullans		
Watt's Town		
Windy Hall		

=== Cumber Lower ===
Townland	Irish Origin (if applicable)	Meaning
Ardground		
Ballygroll		
Ballynamore		
Brackfield		
Brockagh		
Clonmakane		
Crossballycormick		
Ervey		
Fawney		
Gortinreid		
Gosheden		
Highmoor		
Kildoag		
Killaloo		
Killennan		
Lackagh		
Legaghory		
Lettermire		
Lettershendony		
Listress		
Mullaboy		
Oghill		
Oughtagh		
Slaghtmanus		
Strathall		
Tamnaherin		
Tamnymore	Tamhnach Mór	great field/meadow
Tamnyreagh		
Toneduff		

=== Cumber Upper ===
Townland	Irish Origin (if applicable)	Meaning
Alla Upper		
Altaghoney		
Ballyartan		
Ballycallaghan		
Ballyholly		
Ballymaclanigan		
Barr Cregg		
Binn		
Claudy	clóidigh	fast flowing water/river
Coolnacolpagh		
Cregg		
Cumber		
Dunady		
Dungorkin		
Gilky Hill		
Glenlough		
Gortilea		
Gortnaran		
Gortnaskey		
Kilcaltan		
Kilculmagrandal		
Killycor		
Kinculbrack		
Letterlogher		
Lettermuck		
Ling		
Lisbunny		
Mulderg		
Raspberry Hill		
Sallowilly		
Tullintrain		

=== Derryloran (County Londonderry portion) ===
Townland	Irish Origin (if applicable)	Meaning
Ballyforlea		
Ballyloughan		
Cloghog		
Derrycrummy		
Drumrot		
Dunman		
Killybearn		
Tamlaghtmore		
Terressan		
Tullyboy		

=== Desertlyn ===
Townland	Irish Origin (if applicable)	Meaning
Ballycomlargy		
Ballymuckleheany		
Ballymully		
Carmean		
Carndaisy		
Carrydarragh		
Crossnarea		
Dunronan		
Feenan Beg		
Gortagilly		
Larrycormick		
Lisalbanagh		
Magherascullion		
Moymucklemurry		
Quilly		
Tamnadoey		
Tullynagee		

=== Desertmartin ===
Townland	Irish Origin (if applicable)	Meaning
Annagh and Moneysterling		
Ballymacpherson		
Ballynagown		
Boveagh	Both Bheitheach	
Brackagh Slieve Gallion		
Carncose		
Cranny	Ghreanaigh	
Cullion		
Curr	Chora	
Dromore		
Durnascallon	Dair na Sceallán	
Gortanewry		
Grange		
Killyboggin		
Knocknagin		
Lecumpher		
Longfield		
Luney	Leamhnaigh	
Motalee		
Rosgarran	Ros Gearráin	
Roshure		
Stranagard		
Tirgan		

=== Desertoghill ===
Townland	Irish Origin (if applicable)	Meaning
Ballyagan		
Ballydullaghan		
Ballylame		
Ballymenagh		
Ballynameen		
Bellury		
Boghilboy		
Carbalintober		
Carrowreagh		
Caulhame		
Craigall		
Craigavole		
Crossland		
Cuilbane		
Culnaman		
Dullaghy		
Edenbane		
Gort		
Gortacloghan		
Killyvally		
Kurin		
Laragh		
Lisachrin		
Moneydig		
Movenis		
Moyletra Kill		
Moyletra Toy		
Tamnyrankin		
Tirkeeran		
Trienaltenagh		
Twenty Acres		

=== Drumachose ===
Townland	Irish Origin (if applicable)	Meaning
Ardgarvan	Ard Gharbháin	gravel height
Ballyavelin North	Baile Gaibhlin	homestead of the little (river-)fork
Ballycrum	Baile Crom	crooked/sloping homestead
Ballynahery	Baile Machaire	homestead plain
Ballyrisk More	Baile Rúscaigh Mór	big homestead of the marsh
Bolea	Both Liath or Buaile	grey hut/monastic place or dairy/milking place
Bovally	Bó Baile or Bó Bhealaigh	cow homestead or cow road/pass
Cahery	Cathair	stone fort
Carran	Carran	rocky land
Carrydoo	Caraidh Dubh	black weir
Coolessan	Cúil Leasáin	nook/angle of the little fort
Deer Park		
Derry Beg	Daire Beag	little oak grove
Derry More	Daire Mór	big oak grove
Drummond	Drumman	hill-ridge
Drumramer	Droim Reamhar	thick ridge
Dunbeg	Dún Beag	little fort
Dunmore	Dún Mór	big fort
Enagh	Eanach	marsh
Fruithill		fruit hill
Glebe	An Ghléib	tract of church land
Glenkeen	Gleann Caoin	pleasant valley
Gortcorbies	Gort Corr Buidhe	yellow round hill field
Gortgarn	Gort Garráin or Gort gCarn	field of groves or cairn field
Keady	Céide	flat-topped hill
Killane	Coill Leathan or Cill Leathan	broad wood or broad church
Largyreagh	Leargaidh Riabhach	grey hill-side
Leck	Leac	flat-rock
Mullane	Mullán	little summit
Rathbrady Beg (Newtown Limavady)	Ráth Bhríde Mór	small fort of Brigid
Rathbrady More	Ráth Bhríde Mór	large fort of Brigid
Ruskey	Rúscaigh	morass (a mire/marsh)
Streeve	Sraobh	mill stream
Tirmaquin	Tir Mhic Chuinn	land of Conn's son

=== Dunboe ===
Townland	Irish Origin (if applicable)	Meaning
Altikeeragh		
Ardina		
Articlave Upper		
Artidillon		
Ballymadigan		
Ballymoney		
Ballywildrick Upper		
Ballywoodock		
Ballywoolen		
Bannbrook Upper		
Bellany		
Bennarees		
Big Glebe	An Ghléib Mhór	[big] area of land granted to a clergyman as part of his benefice
Blakes Upper		
Bogtown		
Burren Beg		
Burren More		
Carneety		
Dartress		
Downhill		
Drumagully		
Dunalis Lower		
Exorna		
Farranlester		
Freehall Dunlop		
Glebe Big	An Ghléib Bheag	[small] area of land granted to a clergyman as part of his benefice
Glebe Little		
Gortgran		
Gortycavan		
Grange Beg		
Grange More		
Hunter's Glebe		
Killyveety		
Knocknogher		
Liffock		
Little Glebe		
Long's Glebe		
Masteragwee		
Mullanhead		
Pottagh		
Quilley Lower		

=== Dungiven ===
Townland	Irish Origin (if applicable)	Meaning
Ashlamaduff		
Ballyguddin		
Ballymacallion		
Ballymakeever		
Ballymonan		
Ballyness		
Boviel		
Brishey		
Carn		
Cashel		
Cluntygeeragh		
Corick		
Crabarkey		
Cruckanim		
Curraghlane		
Currudda		
Derryduff		
Derryware		
Dungiven		
Eden		
Evishagaran		
Glenshane		
Gortgarn		
Gortnagross		
Hass		
Lackagh		
Lenamore		
Magheraboy		
Ovil		
Owenbeg		
Scriggan		
Tamniarin		
Tirgoland		

=== Errigal ===
Townland	Irish Origin (if applicable)	Meaning
Altduff	Alt Dubh	black hillside
Ballintemple	Baile an Teampaill	church town
Ballyrogan	Baile (Uí) Ruagáin	Rogan's homestead
Belraugh	Béal Rátha	Mouth of the fort
Boleran	Baile Uí Shírín	O'Sheeran's homstead
Brockagh	Brocach	badger place
Brockaghboy	Brocach Buí	yellow place of badgers
Cah	Cath	battle
Coolcoscreaghan	Cúil Cois Creagán or Cúil Coscrachain	back foot of the little creg or corner/back of Coscrachain
Coolnasillagh	Cúil na Saileach	corner or angle of the sallows
Crockindollagh	Cnocan Duilleach	leafy hillock
Drumbane	Droim Bán	white ridge
Dunnavenny	Dún na ??	fort of the ??
Farrantemple Glebe	Fearann Teampaill	church land
Freugh	Fraoch	heath
Garvagh	Garbh Achadh	rough (ploughed) field
Glenkeen	Glenn Caoin	pleasant valley
Gortfad	Gort Fada	long tilled field
Gortnamoyagh	Gort na mBóitheach	tilled field of the byres or cow-houses
Inshaleen	Inse a Lín	island/water-meadow of flax
Liscall	Lios Cathail	Cathail's fort
Lisnascreghog	Lios na Scréachog	fort of the screech owl
Mettican Glebe		
Slaghtaverty	Sleacht Abhartaigh	monument of Abhartach
Tamnymore	Tamhnaigh Mór	big field
Tibaran	Tíghe Baran	Baran's house

=== Faughanvale ===
Townland	Irish Origin (if applicable)	Meaning
Ardnaguniog	Ard na gChunneog	height of the churns
Ballygudden	Baile-ui-Ghodain	Place of theft
Barnakilly		
Black Brae (Intake)		
Bolie	Buaile	the mountain pasture of cattle
Campsey Upper		
Carmoney		
Carnakilly Upper		
Carnamuff		
Carrickhugh		
Clanterkee		
Cloghole		
Coolafinny	Cúl Áit Fionnai	place of the bright recess
Coolagh		
Coolkeenaght	Cuaille Cianachta	the bare tree of Keenaght
Craigbrack	Carraig Breac	speckled rock
Cregan		
Derryarkin Lower		
Donnybrewer Level (Intake)		
Drummaneny		
Dungullion		
Dunlade Glebe		
Falloward	Fála Ard	the high hedges/enclosures
Faughanvale		
Glasakeeran		
Glebe		
Gortagherty Lower		
Gortenny		
Gortgare		
Greenan		
Gresteel Beg	Glas Stiall Beag	small grey strip (of land)
Gresteel More	Glas Stiall Mór	large grey strip (of land)
Killylane	Coille Leathain	the broad wood
Killywool	Coille Ghuail	the charcoal wood
Kilnappy	Cill na nAbhadh	church of the abbot
Laraghaleas	Láthrach a Lios	site of the ancient fort
Legavannon	Lug a Meannáin	hollow of the kids
Ligg	Lug	the hollow
Longfield Beg		
Loughermore		
McLean and Partners Division		
Magheramore		
Minegallagher Glebe		
Mobuoy	Maigh Buí	the yellow plain
Monehanegan		
Monnaboy		
Muff		
Salt Works		
Templemoyle		
Tirmacoy		
Tullanee		

=== Formoyle ===
Townland	Irish Origin (if applicable)	Meaning
Altibryan		
Ballinrees		
Ballystrone		
Belgarrow		
Bratwell		
Formoyle		
Formullen		
Knockmult		
Sconce		

=== Grange of Scullion (County Londonderry portion) ===
Townland	Irish Origin (if applicable)	Meaning
Church Island		

=== Kilcronaghan ===
Townland	Irish Origin (if applicable)	Meaning
Ballinderry	Baile an Doire	homestead of the oakwood
Brackaghlislea	Bhreacach Lios Liath	speckled grey fort
Calmore	An Coill Mór	the great hazel
Clooney	An Chluanaidh	the meadow
Cloughfin	Cloch Fionn	white stone
Coolsaragh	Cúl Sáráin	field of the hill-back slaughter
Drumballyhagan	Droim Bhaile Uí Ágáin	ridge of O'Hagan's homestead
Drumballyhagan Clark	Droim Bhaile Uí Ágáin	ridge of O'Hagan's homestead
Drumcrow	Droim Crua	the hard ridge
Drumsamney	Droim Samhna	ridge of Samhain
Gortahurk	Gort an Choirce	(arable) field of oats
Gortamney	Gort an tSamhraidh	summer (arable) field
Granny	Crannaigh or Granach	wooded place or gravely place
Keenaght	Caonach	mossy/swamp
Killynumber	An Choillidh Umar	wood of the trough
Killytoney	An Choillidh Tamhnaigh	woody cultivated spot
Moneyshanere	Muine Sean Iúir or fhéir	thicket of old yew's or grass
Mormeal	Mór Mael(án) or Mír Mhíchíl	great blunt hillock or St Michael's portion
Moybeg Kirley	Maigh Beag Corr Liath	little plain of the grey pointed hill
Moyesset	Maigh Easóg	plain of weasels
Tamnyaskey	Tamhnaigh na Sceach or Eascaigh	field of hawthornes or quagmire
Tobermore	An Tobar Mór	the great well

=== Kildollagh (County Londonderry portion) ===
Townland	Irish Origin (if applicable)	Meaning
Coolderry North		
Dam Head		
Dromore		
Drumaduan		
Fish Loughan		
Loughan Island		
Loughanreagh North		
Mill Loughan		
Pullans North		

=== Killelagh ===
Townland	Irish Origin (if applicable)	Meaning
Ballyknock		
Beagh (Temporal)		
Carrowmenagh		
Corlacky		
Culnagrew		
Fallylea		
Glebe		
Gortinure		
Granaghan		
Halfgayne		
Knockoneill		
Moneysharven		
Slaghtneill		
Swatragh		
Tirhugh		
Tirkane		
Tirnony		

=== Killowen ===
Townland	Irish Origin (if applicable)	Meaning
Ballycairn		
Castletoodry		
Churchland		
Drumaquill		
Killcranny		

=== Kilrea ===
Townland	Irish Origin (if applicable)	Meaning
Claragh	Clar	plain/level spot
Erganagh	possibly Eircneach or Aircheanneach	salmon river or townland of hereditary war
Fallahogy	Fál an Chúige	enclosure/field of a fifth (a land division)
Kilrea	Cill Ria	church of the journey (possibly)
Lislea	Lios Liath	grey fort
Moneygran		
Movanagher	Maigh Beanncair	plain of pointed hills
Moyagoney	Maigh Éignigh	Hegney's plain
Moyknock	Maigh Cnoc	hill plain
Mullan	Maolain	little hill or Mullan (name)

=== Learmount (County Londonderry portion) ===
Townland	Irish Origin (if applicable)	Meaning
Altinure Upper		
Ballyrory		
Carnanbane		
Carnanreagh		
Clagan		
Dreen		
Eden		
Gortscreagan		
Kilcreen		
Kilgort		
Lear		
Loughtilube		
Moneyhoghan		
Straid		
Stranagalwilly		
Tamnagh		
Teenaght		
Terrydreen		
Tireighter		

=== Lissan (County Londonderry portion) ===
Townland	Irish Origin (if applicable)	Meaning
Ballybriest		
Brackagh		
Caneese		
Clagan		
Coltrim		
Derryganard		
Lissan Demesne	Liosáin	
Dirnan	Daire Eidhneáin	
Drumard		
Drummeen		
Dunnabraggy		
Glebe		
Killybasky		
Knockadoo		
Letteran		
Lismoney		
Mobuy		
Muff		
Rossmore		
Tintagh		

=== Macosquin ===
Townland	Irish Origin (if applicable)	Meaning
Ardvarness	Árd Bheárnas	high gaps
Ballintaggart	Baile an tSagairt	homestead of the priest
Ballinteer South	Baile an tSaoir	homestead of the craftsman (carpenter/stonemason)
Ballylagan	Baile an Lagáin	homestead of the hallow
Ballynacanon	Baile na gCanónach	homestead of the canon's
Ballyness	Baile an Easa	homestead of the waterfall (of Loch Craoi)
Ballyvennox	Baile Beannachadh	homestead of the blessing
Ballywilliam	Baile Uilliam	William's homestead
Balteagh Upper	Bailte Fhiaich	Fee's homesteads
Bushtown	Bush + Town	
Cam	Cam	crooked/curved
Camus	Camas	river-bend
Camus Macosquin Glebe	Camas Maigh Choscáin	river-bend of Coscan's plain
Carndougan		
Cashel		
Castleroe		
Coole Glebe Lower		
Coolyvenny		
Croaghan		
Crossgare		
Curragh		
Derrydorragh		
Dromore		
Drumcroon		
Dunderg		
Englishtown		
Farranlester	Fearann Leastair	land of the vessels
Farranseer	Fearann Saor	the free land
Gills		
Glenhall	Gleann Coll/hAille	valley of the hazel/slope
Glenleary	Gleann Cléireach	valley of the clerk/cleric
Killure	Cill Iubhar	yew church
Kilmaconnell	Cill Mhic Dhomhnaill	MacConnell's church
Kiltinny Lower	Cill Theineadh	church of the fire
Kiltinny Upper	Cill Theineadh	church of the fire
Kinnyglass	Cionn na Glas	head of the rivulet (small river)
Learden	Ladhar Donn or Leath Ardin	brown fork (land between two converging rivers) or portion/side of little height
Leck	Leac	flat rock
Letterloan	Leitir Luáin	Lamb's / O'Loans hillside
Lismurphy	Lios (Ui) Murchadha	O'Murphy's fort
Macleary	Maigh Cléireach	plain of the clerk/cleric
Macosquin	Maigh Choscáin	Coscan's plain
Ringrash Beg	Rinn Ras Bheag or Rinn Ros Bheag	headland of the shrub or grove
Somerset		
Tamnamoney	Tamhnaigh na Móna/Muine	field of the bog/thicket

=== Maghera ===
Townland	Irish Origin (if applicable)	Meaning
Ballymacilcurr		
Ballymacpeake Upper		
Ballynacross		
Ballynahone Beg		
Beagh (Spiritual)		
Bracaghreilly		
Craigadick		
Craigmore		
Crew		
Culnady		
Curragh		
Curran		
Dreenan		
Drumard	Droim Ard	
Drumconready		
Drumlamph		
Drummuck		
Dunglady		
Falgortrevy		
Fallagloon		
Gorteade		
Grillagh		
Gulladuff		
Keady		
Kirley		
Largantogher		
Lisnamuck		
Macknagh		
Moneymore		
Moyagall		
Rocktown		
Slaghtybogy		
Tamnymartin		
Tamnymullan		
Tirgarvil		
Tirnageeragh		
Toberhead		

=== Magherafelt ===
Townland	Irish Origin (if applicable)	Meaning
Aghagaskin	Achadh Ui Gaschain	O'Gaskin's field
Annaghmore		
Ballyheifer		
Ballymoghan More		
Ballynocker		
Coolshinny	Cúil Sionnaigh	Corner of the Fox
Drumrainey		
Dunamoney		
Dunarnon		
Glebe		
Glenmaquill		
Killyfaddy		
Killyneese		
Leckagh		
Megargy		
Mullaghboy		
Polepatrick	Poll Phadráig	(St) Patrick's hole
Shanemullagh		
Tamnadeese	Tamhnach Dias	field of the ear of corn
Town Parks of Magherafelt		

=== Magilligan (Tamlaghtard) ===
Townland	Irish Origin (if applicable)	Meaning
Aughill		
Avish	Eibhis	the coarse mountain pasture
Ballyleighery Upper	Baile Ui Laeghaire	town of O'Leary
Ballymaclary		
Ballymagoland		
Ballymulholland		
Ballymultimber		
Ballyscullion	Baile Uí Scoillín	O'Scullion's townland
Bellarena	Béal Átha na Ríona/Baile an Mhargaidh	Ford mouth of the queen/Town of the Market
Benone	Bun Abhann	foot of the river
Carnowry	Carn Abhra	the cairn of Avry
Carrowreagh	Ceathrú Riabhach	grey quarter(land)
Clagan	Cloigeann	skull (round hill)
Clooney	Chluanaidh	meadow
Craig	Creag	rock
Croaghan	Cruachán	the little round hill
Doaghs Upper	Dumhach Uachtarach	upper sandbank
Drumahorgan	Droim na hArcáin	Harkin's ridge
Drumavally	Droim a Bhealaigh	the ridge of the pass/road
Drummans Middle	Dromainn	the ridges
Drumnahay	Droim na hÁithe	the ridge of the kiln
Duncrun	Dún Cruithean	fort of the Cruthin
Glebe		
Gort (part of Glebe)	Gort	(arable) field
Gortmore	Gort Mór	great (arable) field
Lenamore	Leana Mór	the great meadow
Margymonaghan	Margadh Uí Mhanacháin	(O')Monaghan's market
Mill Town	Baile an Mhuilinn	town of the mill
Minearny	Muine Airneadh	the brake of the sloes
Oughtymore	Ochtach Mór	the great breast
Oughtymoyle	Ochtach Maol	bare/bald breast
Scotchtown		
Tamlaght	Tamhlacht	burial place
Tircreven	Tír Craobhán	land of bushes

=== Tamlaght (Co. Londonderry portion) ===
Townland	Irish Origin (if applicable)	Meaning
Ballydawley		
Ballymoyle	Baile Maol	bald/flat townland
Druminard	Droimín Ard	the little ridge of the height
Rusky Lower		
Tamlaght		

=== Tamlaght Finlagan ===
Townland	Irish Origin (if applicable)	Meaning
Ardnargle	Ard na Aireagal	high oratory/habitation/small church
Back	Baic	bend/crook
Ballyhenry West	Baile (Mhic) Éinrí (O'Cahan sept variant)	Henry's homestead
Ballykeen	Baile Caoin	beautiful/pleasant homestead
Ballykelly Level	Baile (Uí) Cheallaigh	O'Kelly's homestead
Ballymacran	Baile na Crannach	homestead of the tree-plantation
Ballyspallan	Baile (Uí) Spealláin	O'Spillane's homestead
Broglasco	Bruach Glas Chuaidh or Brugh Glas Chuaidh	border/river-bank of the green hollow or mansion of the green hallow
Broharris	Bruach Fhearghusa or Bruach Thairis	Fergus's border or beyond/across the border
Broighter	Bruach Íochtair	lower (river-)bank
Burnally	Bùrn Àille (from Scottish burn)	beautiful (spring) water
Carlaragh	Corr Laragh	hill of mares
Carrowclare	Ceathrú Clár	quarter(land) of the plain
Carrowmenagh	Ceathrú Meadhonach	middle quarter(land)
Carrowmuddle	Ceathrú ??	?? quarter(land)
Carrowreagh	Ceathrú Riabhach	grey quarter(land)
Clagan	Cloigeann	skull (round hill)
Corndale Lower	Carn Dail	portion/dale of the cairn
Crindle	Crìon Dáil or Crìon Dail	little portion (of land) or little dale (meadow)
Culmore Lower	Cúil Mór	great nook/corner
Culmore Upper	Cúil Mór	great nook/corner
Deer Park		
Dromore	Droim Mór	big ridge
Drumacarney	Droim Uí Chearnaigh	O'Kearney's ridge
Drumacony	Droim na Conaidh	ridge of the fire-wood
Drumballydonaghy	Droim Baile Uí Donnchaidh	homestead of O'Donaghy's ridge
Drummond	Drumman	hill ridge
Drumraighland	Droim Rachlainn	Raghlan's ridge
Drumrane	Droim Raithne	ridge of ferns
Dunbrock	Dún Broc	fort of badgers
Farlow	For Loch	outlying lake
Glack	Glac	narrow valley/hallow
Glasvey	Glas Bheith	green birch tree
Glebe		
Lisnakilly	Lios na Choillidh	fort of the wood
Lomond	Lomann	bare/forlorn
Magheramore	Machaire Mór	great plain
Moneyrannel	Muine Raghnail	Randal's thicket
Mulkeeragh	Maol Caerach	small hill of sheep
Mullagh	Mullach	summit
Myroe Level	Má Rua + Level	red plain
Ned	Nead	nest
Oghill	Eochaill	yew-wood
Rascahan	Ros (Ui) Catháin	O'Kanes grove
Sesnagh	corruption of Seisreach	ploughland
Shanreagh	Sean Riabhach	old grey land
Sheep Marsh		
Sistrakeel	Seisreach Caol	narrow ploughland
Tamlaght	Tamhlacht	burial place
Tartnakilly	Teach na Choillidh	house of the wood
Tully	Tulach	hillock
Tullyhoe	Tulach hUamha	hillock of the cave

=== Tamlaght O'Crilly ===
Townland	Irish Origin (if applicable)	Meaning
Ballymacpeake Lower	Baile Mhic Péice	McPeake's homstead
Ballynian	Baile na nÉan	homestead of the birds
Bovedy	Both Mhíde	Míde's hut/monastic cell
Drumagarner	Droim Uí Gharbháin	O'Garvin's ridge
Drumane	Droim Éan	ridge of birds
Drumard	Droim Árd	high ridge
Drumlane	Droim Leathan	broad ridge
Drumnacannon	Droim na gCanónach	ridge of the canons (site of ancient parish church)
Drumoolish	Droim Maolais	ridge of the bald (hill) top
Drumsaragh	Droim Sáráin	ridge of the slaughter
Eden	Éadan	hill brow
Glenone	Cluain Eoghain	Owen's meadow
Gortmacrane	Gort ??	stony field
Inishrush	Inis Rois	island of the promontory
Killygullib Glebe	Cillidh Ghulba	church of the projecting (beak-like) hill
Killymuck Glebe	Coill na Muc	wood of the pigs
Lisgorgan Glebe	Lios Ó gCorragáin	fort of the O'Corrigans
Lismoyle	Lios Maol	bare fort
Lisnagrot	Lios na gCrot	ring-fort of the humps
Moneysallin	Muine Saileáin	thicket of the willows
Moneystaghan Ellis	Muine Steach	Steachán's (Stephen's) thicket
Moneystaghan Macpeake	Muine Steach	Steachán's (Stephen's) thicket
Mullaghnamoyagh	Mullach na mBóitheach	hilltop of the byres or cowhouses
Timaconway	Tigh Mhic Conmidhe	McConway's house
Tyanee	Tigh Uí Niaidh	O'Nees house

=== Templemore ===
Townland	Irish Origin (if applicable)	Meaning
Ballougry	Baile Loch Ria	grey lake homestead
Ballyarnet	Baile Arnoid	Arnett's/Harnet's (still a local family surname) homestead
Ballymagowan	Baile na gCanónach'	homestead of the canons
Ballymagrorty (White House)	Baile Mic Robhartaigh	McGroaty's homestead
Ballynagalliagh	Baile na gCailleach	homestead of the nuns
Ballynagard	Baile na gCeard	homestead of the artificers
Ballynashallog	Baile na Saileog	homestead of the little willows
Cloughglass	Cloch Glas	green stone
Coshquin	Cois Chuinn	foot (of a mountain or other feature) of Conn
Creevagh Lower	Craobhach	place of sacred trees
Creevagh Upper	Craobhach	place of sacred trees
Creggan	Creagán	little rock
Culmore	Cúil Mór	big nook
Edenballymore	Éadan Baile Mór	brow of the big homestead
Elagh More	Aileach Mór	great stone house/place of habitation
Killea	Cill Aodha	Hugh's church
Londonderry	London + Daire	oak grove
Mullennan	Muilean	mill
Pennyburn	Either named after Pen y Bryn or (Irish/Scots) Pingine + (Scots) burn	top of the hill or penny large stream/small river
Shantallow	Sean Talamh	old land
Sheriffs Mountain		
Springhill		
Springtown		
Termonbacca	Tearmainn Bacach	sanctuary of lames/cripples

=== Termoneeny ===
Townland	Irish Origin (if applicable)	Meaning
Ballynahone More	Baile na Abhann Mór	homestead of the river
Broagh	Bruach	river bank
Cabragh	Cabrach	bad unprofitable land
Carricknakielt	Carraig Uí Chaoilte	O'Kielt's rock
Derganagh	Dearg Eanach	red marsh
Knocknakielt	Cnoc na Uí Chaoilte	O'Kielt's hill
Lemnaroy	Léim an Eich Ruaidh	leap of the reddish horse
Lurganagoose	Lorgain na gCuas	long-ridge of the caves
Mullagh	Mullach	summit

== See also ==
- List of civil parishes of County Londonderry
- County Londonderry, Northern Ireland
- Maps Of Townlands, Civil Parishes and Baronies https://www.townlands.ie/londonderry/
