= List of archaeological sites in County Londonderry =

List of archaeological sites in County Londonderry, Northern Ireland:

== A ==
- Aghagaskin, Rath, grid ref: H8942 9315
- Altaghoney, Cross, grid ref: C5371 0192
- Altikeeragh, Rath, grid ref: C7551 3199
- Altinure Upper, Rath, grid ref: C5951 0305
- Annagh and Moneysterlin, Crannog at Loughinsholin, grid ref: H8475 9262
- Artikelly, World War II training dome, grid ref: C6811 2511
- Aughlish, Stone circles and alignments, grid ref: Area of C662 043

== B ==
- Ballindrum, Rath, grid ref: H8693 8207
- Ballybriest, Wedge tomb (area surrounding the state care monument), grid ref: H7618 8845
- Ballybriest, Dual court tomb, ‘Carnanbane’ (area surrounding the state care monument), grid ref: H7617 8857
- Ballybriest, Wedge tomb, grid ref: H7642 8860
- Ballybriest, Stone circle complex, grid ref: H7564 8899
- Ballycairn, Motte and bailey, grid ref: C8350 3420
- Ballydonegan, Sweat house, grid ref: C6276 0234
- Ballyhacket Lisawilling, Mound, grid ref: C7501 3301
- Ballyhacket Toberclaw, Rath, grid ref: C7523 3270
- Ballyhanna, Round cairn, grid ref: C7012 2835
- Ballyholly, Stone circle, alignment and megalithic tombs, grid ref: C5771 1178
- Ballykelly, Church, grid ref: C6225 2273
- Ballykelly, Plantation village site: Walworth, grid ref: Area of C623 226
- Ballymagrorty, Cairn with cist, grid ref: C3855 1697
- Ballymagrorty or White House, Heavy Anti-Aircraft Battery, grid ref: C3967 1874
- Ballymoney, Rath, grid ref: C7738 3413
- Ballymully, Church, graveyard and enclosure: ‘Desertlyn church’, grid ref: H8414 8452
- Ballymully, Wedge tomb, grid ref: H8472 8436
- Ballymulderg Beg, Mound, grid ref: H9092 8690
- Ballymultrea, Plantation castle, bawn and village site: Salterstown, grid ref: H9518 8236
- Ballynacannon, Rath, grid ref: C8145 2597
- Ballynagard, Light Anti-Aircraft Position, grid ref: C4655 2149
- Ballynashallog, Neolithic settlement ‘Thornhill’, grid ref: C4594 2130
- Ballyneill More, Rath, grid ref: H9282 8520
- Ballyness, Bivallate rath, grid ref: C7722 1306
- Ballyreagh, Flint scatter and occupation layer, grid ref: C8436 3987
- Ballyrowan Beg, Counterscarp rath, grid ref: H9396 8490
- Ballywildrick Lower, Standing stone, grid ref: C7811 3231
- Ballywoolen, Prehistoric sandhills settlement site, C7818 3567
- Ballywoolen, Mole (eastern), grid ref: C7817 3664
- Beagh (Temporal), Mound, grid ref: C8596 0714
- Belagherty, Bivallate rath, grid ref: H9356 8473
- Bellury, Rath, grid ref: C8778 1523
- Bolie, Rath, grid ref: C5886 1966
- Bovevagh, Church, graveyard and tomb (area surrounding the State Care monument)
- Boviel, Wedge tomb: Cloghagalla, grid ref: C7295 0779
- Brockaghboy, Rath, grid ref: C8094 1259
- Brockaghboy, Rath, grid ref: C8100 1253
- Brockaghboy, Rath, grid ref: C8026 1220

== C ==
- Cabragh, Windmill: Knockcloghrim, grid ref: H8953 9694
- Calmore, crannog, grid ref: NV975556
- Camus, Cross and bullaun, grid ref: C8717 2897
- Carn, Cashel, grid ref: C7568 0673
- Carn, Wedge tomb, grid ref: C7328 0707
- Carnalridge, Standing stone: the White Wife, grid ref: C8475 3872
- Carnanbane, Court tomb, grid ref: C6709 0585
- Carnanbane (on boundary with Magheramore), Stone cross (termon cross associated with Banagher Church, grid ref: C6746 0655
- Carrick East, Central court tomb: ‘Stone circle’, grid ref: C7044 1738
- Carrydarragh, Rath, grid ref: H8311 8420
- Carrydoo, Rath, grid ref: C7205 2558
- Cashel, Sweat house, grid ref: C8031 2451
- Cashel, Rath: Black Fort, grid ref: C7178 0674
- Cashel, Cashel and cairn: White Fort, grid ref: C7187 0679
- Clagan, Standing stones (3), grid ref: C5823 0548
- Claudy and Dungorkin, Earthwork, grid ref: C5500 0845
- Clonmakane, Court tomb, grid ref: C5474 1555
- Clooney (Derry), Chapel: St Columb's or St Brecan's, grid ref: C4425 1743
- Clooney, Star fortification: Ebrington Barracks, grid ref: C4409 1696
- Coolnasillagh, Stone circle and alignment, grid ref: C7846 0043
- Coolsaragh, Rath: Drumbally Fort, grid ref: H8424 9363
- Corick, Stone alignments and circle, grid ref:Area of H780 896
- Craigmore, Rath, grid ref: C8482 0177
- Cregg, Standing stone: the White Stone, grid ref: C5311 0797
- Cregg, Counterscarp rath, grid ref: C5359 0681
- Crevolea, Portal tomb: Grey Stone, grid ref: C8470 2335
- Crossreagh East, Mole (eastern), grid ref: C7843 3640
- Crockindollagh, Rath, grid ref: C8204 1903
- Cuilbane, Stone circle or cairn: Tamney Cromlech, grid ref: C8304 1219
- Culmore, Heavy Anti-Aircraft Battery, grid ref: C4736 2380
- Culnagrew, Standing stone and burials, grid ref: C8671 0842

== D ==
- Deer Park, Castle (site): O’Cahan's Castle, grid ref: C6772 2039
- Derry, Linear Cellars (East Wall), grid ref: Area of C436 167
- Derry, 17th century windmill, grid ref: C4291 1616
- Derrycrier, Standing stone, grid ref: C6703 0849
- Doon, Rath, grid ref: H7616 9400
- Downhill, Enclosure, grid ref: C7596 3504
- Downhill, Church and graveyard: Dunboe, grid ref: C7582 3541
- Dreenan, Rath, grid ref: C9139 0099
- Drum, Drum Fort or Larry's Fort (area surrounding the state care monument), grid ref: C6546 1137
- Drumadreen, Rath, grid ref: C6895 1570
- Drumaduan, Rath, grid ref: C9083 2984
- Drumard, Rath, grid ref: H8272 8400
- Drumcovit, Rath: Tandragee Fort, grid ref: C6345 0501
- Drumcovit, Standing stone, grid ref: C6335 0519
- Drumderg, Portal tomb: Dergmore's Grave, grid ref: H7505 9597
- Drummans Lower, Heavy Anti-Aircraft Battery, grid ref: C6447 3728
- Dunbeg, Sweat house, grid ref: C7373 2660
- Duncrun, Church site and cross-carved stone: Church Hill, grid ref: C6817 3237
- Duncrun, Rath, grid ref: C6879 3209
- Dunderg, Rath, grid ref: C8331 2941
- Dunderg, Rath, grid ref: C8305 3010
- Dunderg, Fundamental bench mark, grid ref: C8315 2939
- Dungiven, Standing stone, grid ref: C6942 0844
- Dungiven, Dungiven Castle: part of walls, grid ref: C6924 0907
- Dungiven, Priory, manor house and bawn, grid ref: C6920 0826
- Dunmore, Rath, grid ref: C7444 2694

== E ==
- Eden, Cashel, grid ref: C6040 0244
- Elagh More, Doherty Tower or Castle Aileach, grid ref: C4158 2165
- Ervey, Portal tomb (area surrounding the state care monument), grid ref: C5170 1260

== F ==
- Farrantemple Glebe, Bivallate rath: Farrantemple Fort, grid ref: C8193 1407
- Faughanvale, Church, grid ref: C5793 2092
- Fincarn, Standing stone, grid ref: C6441 0477
- Freugh, Large enclosure: cashel, grid ref: C7793 1843
- Fruithill, Drumachose Church, grid ref: C6930 2314

== G ==
- Gallany, Standing stone, grid ref: C6441 0477
- Garvagh, Rath: Lisatinny, grid ref: C8385 1635
- Glasakeeran, Wedge tomb: Giant's Grave, grid ref: C5708 1511
- Glebe, Mound: Cashlandoo, grid ref: C8228 3632
- Glebe (Ballywillin), Church, grid ref: C8705 3870
- Gortacloghan, Rath, grid ref: C8396 1204
- Gortica, Standing stone, grid ref: C4889 1462
- Gortinure, Rath, grid ref: C4255 1175
- Gortnamoyagh, Inauguration Stone: Giant's Track, Shane's Leap or St Adamnan’s Footprints, grid ref: Area of C8059 1497
- Granaghan, Rath, grid ref: C8484 0650
- Grange Beg, World War II Pillbox, DHP No 290, grid ref: C79237 35547
- Grange More, Sand dune system with archaeology, grid refs: C8060 3540 and C8020 3510
- Gulladuff, Rath, grid ref: C8952 0019

== I ==
- Inishrush, Crannog in Green Lough (area surrounding the state care monument), grid ref: C9370 0419
- Intake, Church, graveyard and bullaun: Church Island, grid ref: H9752 9464

== K ==
- Keady, Cairn and enclosure, grid ref: C7250 2404
- Keely, Barrow, grid ref: C8871 2271
- Kilcaltan, Standing stone, grid ref: C5244 0812
- Kilgort, Rath, grid ref: C5711 0277
- Kilhoyle, Rath: King’s Fort, grid ref: C7431 1671
- Kilhoyle, Wedge tomb, grid ref: C7531 1625
- Kilhoyle, Possible cashel and souterrain (known as the Rhellick’ Killeen), grid ref: C73800 15980
- Kiltest, Graveyard, grid ref: C7875 2238
- Knockaduff, Burial Mound ‘Tappatowsie’, grid ref: C8749 2383
- Knockoneill (Tamnybrack), Court tomb: Giant's Grave, grid ref: C8196 0875
- Knockoneill (Tamnybrack), Rath, grid ref: C8204 0892

== L ==
- Lackagh, Stone circle, grid ref: C4778 0705
- Lackagh, 4 cairns, grid ref: C4702 0590
- Largantea, Wedge tomb, grid ref: C7264 2690
- Learden, Long mound, ‘Piper’s Hill’, grid ref: C8173 2862
- Leck, Rath, grid ref: C7359 2326
- Lettermuck, Mound, grid ref: C5283 0641
- Lisbunny, Rath, grid ref: C5295 0431
- Lisgorgan Glebe, Rath, grid ref: C8921 0569
- Lismoyle, Bivallate rath, grid ref: C8858 0904
- Little Derry, Cairn: The Fairy Bush, Tassey's Hill, grid ref: C7218 2004
- Lissaghmore, Plantation village site: Agivey, grid ref: Area of C902 226
- Loughan Island, Fortifications: Inis an Loughan, grid ref: C8780 2775
- Loughermore, Cup and ring marked stone, grid ref: C5842 1333
- Loughtilube, Rath, grid ref: C5843 0333
- Loughtilube, Standing stone, grid ref: C5822 0348

== M ==
- Macosquin, Plantation village
- Magherafelt Town Parks, Multi-period church and graveyard, grid ref: H8975 9079
- Magheramore, Rath and attached enclosure, grid ref: C8329 1209
- Magheramore, Earthwork, grid ref: C8322 1476
- Magheramore, Banagher old church (area surrounding state care monument) and cross, grid ref: C6755 0600
- Magheramore, Court tomb and portal tomb (remains of): The Cove Stones, grid ref: C6853 0541
- Managh Beg, Rath (Motte and bailey?), grid ref: C4768 1593
- Mawillian, Rath: The Fort, grid ref: H8881 8262
- Mayboy, Rath, grid ref: C8168 1963
- Meavemanougher, Sweat house, grid ref: C8077 2196
- Mill Loughan & Camus, Ford and associated earthwork, grid ref: C8756 2910
- Mobuy, Standing stone and site of stone circle: Druid's Circle, grid ref: H7827 8591
- Monehanegan, Barrow, grid ref: C5535 1605
- Moneydig, Passage tomb: the Daff Stone, grid ref: C8893 1651
- Moneyguiggy, Rath: White Fort, grid ref: H8127 9680
- Moneyhoghan, Rath, grid ref: C6097 0246
- Moneyhoghan, Cashel, grid ref: C6182 0336
- Moneymore, Rath, grid ref: H8635 8334
- Moneyneany, Rath, grid ref: H7522 9700
- Moneyrannel, Rath: Rough Fort, grid ref: C6585 2303
- Mormeal, Church and graveyard: Kilcronaghan Church, grid ref: H8151 9478
- Mount Sandel, Mesolithic settlement site, grid ref: C8533 3076
- Movanagher, Plantation castle and village site, grid ref: C9203 1589
- Moygall, Barrow, grid ref: H8994 9973
- Muff, Church gable: Eglinton Church, grid ref: C5295 2038
- Muff, Plantation village site: Eglinton, grid ref: Area of C528 203
- Mullaboy, Standing stone (area surrounding the state care monument), grid ref: C5158 1298
- Mullaboy, Cross, grid ref: C5120 1393
- Mullagh, Mound (possible assembly site): Daisy Hill, or Drumceatt, or the Mullagh, grid ref: C6665 2168
- Mullaghacall South, Standing stone, grid ref: C8254 3732
- Mullaghmore, Agivey Church, hole-stone and font, grid ref: C9032 2221

== O ==
- Owenbeg, 2 Standing stones, possibly remains of megalithic tomb, grid ref: C6716 0855

== R ==
- Rallagh, Rath, grid ref: C6668 0663

== S ==
- Sconce, Belgarrow and Knockmult, Rock fortification: Giant's Sconce, grid ref: C7724 2983
- Shantallow, Inauguration stone (St Columb's Stone) at Belmont House Special School, grid ref: C4386 1934
- Slaghtaverty, Cairn: Slaght Averty or Dwarf's Grave, grid ref: C8193 1325
- Slaghtneill, Wedge tomb: Giant's Grave, grid ref: C8238 0611
- Somerset & Mount Sandel, Tidal ford and Mesolithic material, grid ref: C8496 3111
- Stradreagh, Rath, grid ref: C7110 2805
- Stradreagh, Crannog: Rough Island, grid ref: C4720 1942
- Strawmore, Standing stone, possible remains of megalithic tomb, grid ref: H7549 9481

== T ==
- Tamlaght, Defensive earthwork, grid ref: C6842 3115
- Tamlaght (Magilligan), Tamlaghtard Church, saint's grave and holy well, grid ref: C6778 3140
- Tamlaght, Standing stone: ‘The Honeymug Stone’, grid ref: H8886 7843
- Tamlaght (Coagh), Portal tomb: Cloghtogle, grid ref: H8865 7900
- Tamnadeese, Rath, grid ref: H9200 9325
- Tamniaran, Rath, grid ref: C7117 0670
- Tamnyagan, Standing stone, grid ref: C6338 0336
- Teeavan, Reservoir dam: Altnaheglish Reservoir, grid ref: C6960 0412
- Templemoyle, Rath, grid ref: C6665 0572
- Templemoyle, Church site, grid ref: C6704 0733
- Templemoyle, Stone circle/remains of megalithic tomb, grid ref: C6632 0541
- Templetown, Church and graveyard: Enagh or Domnach Dola, grid ref: C4687 1955
- Templetown (Lough Enagh), Crannog and tower house: Green Island, grid ref: C4737 1942
- Terrydreen, Standing stone, grid ref: C6305 0587
- Tintagh, Promontory fort, grid ref: H8277 8576
- Tireighter, Wedge tomb, grid ref: C5911 0195
- Tirnony, Church: Killelagh, grid ref: C8366 0187
- Tobermore, Rath, grid ref: H8333 9720
- Tully, Anti-Aircraft Operations Room, grid ref: C5096 2064
- Tullybrick, Wedge tomb, grid ref: H7473 8950
- Tullybrick, Prehistoric field and cairn complex, grid ref: Area of H720 882
- Tullybrisland, Cross, grid ref: C5606 2094
- Tullynagee, Bivallate rath, grid ref: H8415 8633
- Tullynagee, Ringfort Rath, grid ref: H8421 8642

== U ==
- Upperland, Rath, grid ref: C8689 0533
