= Ballyrory =

Village in County Londonderry, Northern Ireland

Coordinates: 54.891°N 7.126°W

Ballyrory: Irish: Baile Rudhraighe
- Location within Northern Ireland
- Population: 68 (2011 Census)
- District: Derry and Strabane
- County: County Londonderry
- Country: Northern Ireland
- Sovereign state: United Kingdom
- Postcode district: BT47
- Dialling code: 028

Ballyrory (from Irish Baile Rudhraighe, meaning 'The townland of Rory') is a small village and townland (of 426 acres) in County Londonderry, Northern Ireland. It is situated in the civil parish of Cumber Upper and the historic barony of Tirkeeran.

It had a population of 68 people (25 households) in the 2011 Census. It is situated within Derry and Strabane district.

== See also ==
- List of towns and villages in Northern Ireland
- List of townlands in County Londonderry
