= John Pirrie Conerney =

John Pirrie Conerney was an Anglican priest in Ireland during the late 19th century and the first four decades of the 20th.

Reading desk at Holy Trinity Church in Dunfanaghy, donated 1948 in memory of John Pirrie Conerney by his parishioners and friends

Conerney was educated at Trinity College, Dublin. He was ordained deacon in 1894 and priest in 1896. He began his career with a curacy at Donagheady. He held incumbencies at Learmount, Templecrone, Burt with Inch, Upper Cumber and Dunfanaghy. He was appointed Private Chaplain to the Bishop of Derry in 1916 and Dean of Raphoe in 1917. He was Dean and Chaplain until his death in County Donegal on 2 November 1940.
