= Gortnaran =

Gortnaran: Irish: Gort na Rann
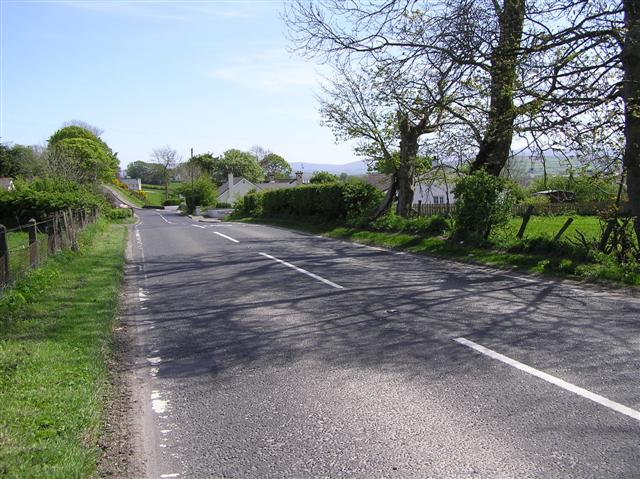
- Gortnaran in 2007
- County: County Down
- Country: Northern Ireland
- Sovereign state: United Kingdom
- Postcode district: BT47
- Dialling code: 028

Gortnaran (from Irish Gort na Rann, meaning 'field of the divisions') is a townland of 268 acres in County Londonderry, Northern Ireland. It is situated in the civil parish of Cumber Upper and the historic barony of Tirkeeran.

== See also ==
- List of townlands in County Londonderry
