= Healthcare in Ireland =

Healthcare in Ireland may refer to either of two healthcare systems in Ireland:

- The Health Service Executive, responsible for Healthcare in the Republic of Ireland
- Health and Social Care in Northern Ireland (part of the United Kingdom National Health Service)

The existence of the two different systems is seen as a major obstacle to Irish unification by Social Democratic and Labour Party politicians. Colum Eastwood said in January 2022 “If I was running the anti-unity campaign, I’d just be running ads about how much it costs to go to the doctor.” Declan Kearney, Sinn Féin national chairman, said that change was needed in the health systems on both sides of the border, rather than being “simply about taking the north and bolting it onto what exists in the south”.

The Congential Heart Disease Network and the North West Cancer Centre at Altnagelvin are unusual because they serve the whole island.
