= Strathfoyle =

Village in County Londonderry, Northern Ireland

Coordinates: 55.03333°N 7.266667°W

Strathfoyle: Irish: Srath na Feabhail
- Location within Northern Ireland
- District: Derry City
- County: County Londonderry
- Country: Northern Ireland
- Sovereign state: United Kingdom
- Post town: Londonderry
- Postcode district: BT47
- Dialling code: 028
- UK Parliament: Foyle
- NI Assembly: Foyle

Strathfoyle (from Irish: Srath Feabhail) is a village in County Londonderry, Northern Ireland It is about 5 miles (8.0 km) north east of Derry. It was newly built in different phases between the late 1950s and the early 1960s, with many new recent additions to the village, including Westlake, Butler's Wharf and Old Fort. In the 2001 Census it had a population of 1,581 people. It is within the Derry Urban Area and the Derry City Council area. The village has a small retail outlet (a pharmacy, a supermarket, a fast food take-away and a beauticians), a Roman Catholic chapel, a library, youth club and a post office. The small retail unit was constructed in 2005 following years of under-investment in the area and pressure by local community leaders to provide more facilities for its residents.

== History ==
=== Foundation ===
Professor Robert Lyons Marshall of Magee College suggested "Strathfoyle" (strath of the River Foyle) in response to a request from Londonderry Rural District Council for a name for its new town.

=== World War II ===
During World War II, Strathfoyle was used as a base for Allied troops. Its location beside Londonderry Port was ideal for Navy vessels, and the port was later used for the capture and destruction of German U-boats after the Battle of the Atlantic. Remnants of the jetty used can be seen at Lisahally. There are also ruins of bunkers scattered throughout the surrounding area, in what the locals refer to as, "The Quarry". This is the area that separates Strathfoyle from the Belfast-Derry railway line and the River Foyle. It is essentially an extensive stretch of forest area, not an actual quarry.

=== Post-war ===
Strathfoyle was more seriously developed after the war and in the 1950s it was established as a housing estate. The area which is commonly known throughout Strathfoyle as 'The New Estate' was built shortly after the erection of the first set of houses, in different phases spanning across three decades, the 1970s, 80s and 90s. In the new millennium, Strathfoyle has seen a surge in popularity and is now seen as a choice location for young people looking for residence. This high interest has led to the construction of new additions to the Strathfoyle area, including 'The Old Fort' and 'Butler's Wharf', the latter of which is named after a local farmer, not after the famous Butler's Wharf area in London.

== Places of interest ==
- Lisahally Docks - Irish Port of the Year 2005
- Enagh Lough
- Enagh Old Church and Graveyard
- City of Derry Rugby Club

== Sport ==
Strathfoyle has been known to produce fine sportsmen and women. However, there has always been strong criticism against the local council, as Strathfoyle remains a poorly facilitated area for youth development.

=== Soccer ===
The local football team, Lisahally F.C., takes its name from the Lisahally port, which is close to the village. Top of the Hill Celtic F.C. is also a popular choice of team to play for with people from Strathfoyle. Both communities share a close relationship with regard to sport. A number of players from Strathfoyle have also joined the newly formed Maydown F.C., who are based in Maydown, a neighbouring village.

=== Gaelic football ===
Strathfoyle was also the base for the now defunct Gaelic football team Enagh GAC. Since becoming defunct, many of Enagh's roster joined St. Mary's Slaughtmanus and it has since become a popular choice of team for Gaelic footballers from the Strathfoyle area.

=== Rugby ===
The City of Derry Rugby Club is situated on the outskirts of Strathfoyle, however, rugby union is not very popular within the village with the village tending to play soccer or Gaelic football.

== Demography ==
The Northern Ireland Statistics and Research Agency (NISRA) census of 29 April 2001 recorded a population of 1,581, classifying Strathfoyle as a village. In 2003 it was reclassified as a discontiguous part of the Derry Urban Area. The 1971 population was 2,263, with declines in 1981, 1991, and 2001, though the boundary used was redefined in 2001. The 2008 population estimate was 2,011.

== Economy ==
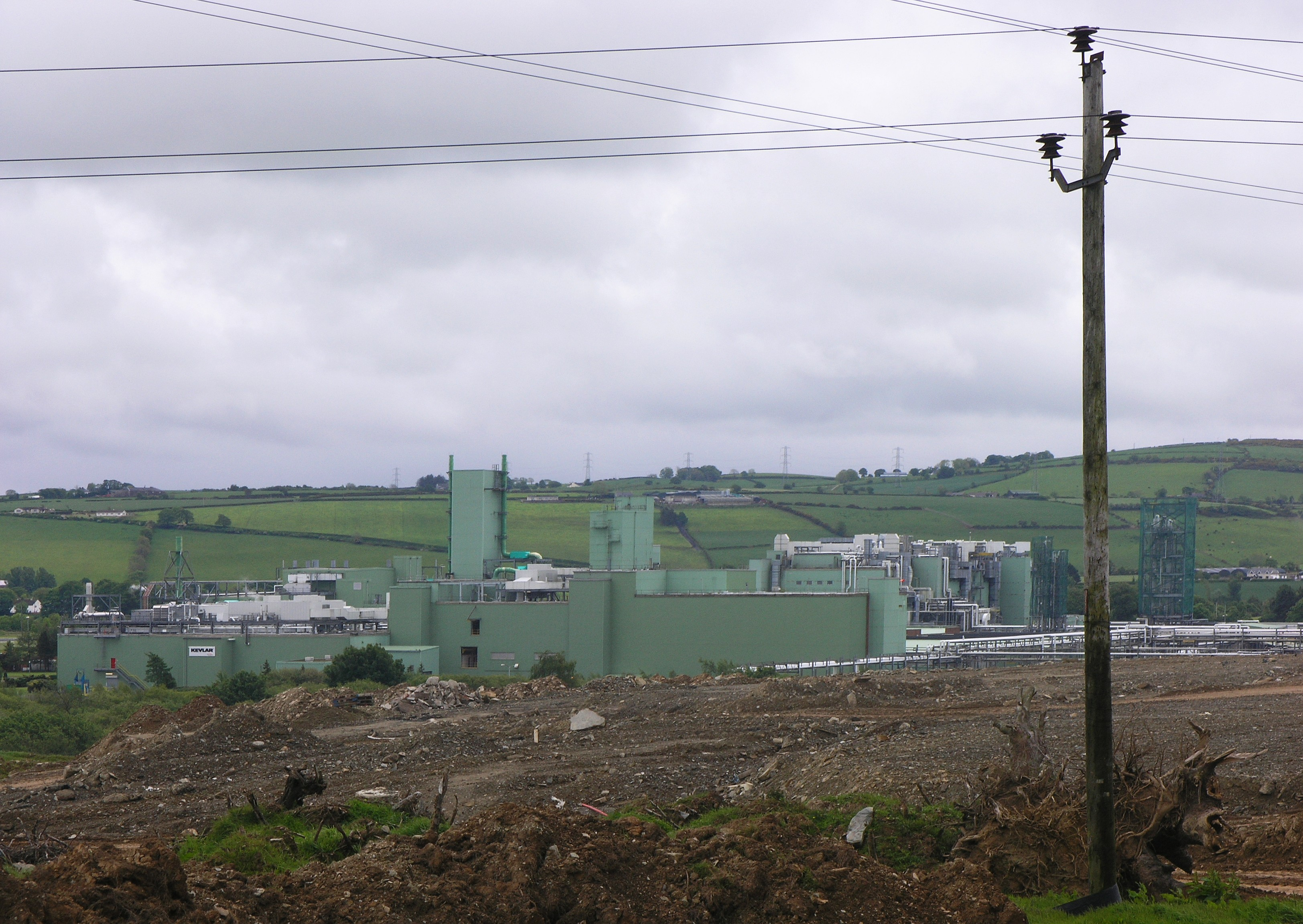
Du Pont factory on the outskirts of Strathfoyle

Companies such as Du Pont, Coolkeeragh ESB and Foyle Meats are situated nearby, and have been, for many years providing employment to the people of Derry. A resentment toward these industries has grown in recent years, in particular toward the foul smell emitted from Foyle Meats. This was demonstrated in a youth scheme, who filmed their activities. In 2005, more than 30 Polish workers in Foyle Meats walked out after being subjected to sectarian abuse. There is also a small retail outlet containing a pharmacy, supermarket, fast food take-away and diner. The local library introduces youth to the world of literature and is also equipped with a number of computers. Nearby, the Teacher Training Centre is one of the main centres in Derry. Just outside Strathfoyle, in Maydown, there is an industrial park containing a steel factory. Lisahally, the Londonderry Port is also a base of employment for many Derry citizens.

== Education ==
St. Oliver Plunkett's Primary School, provides education for around 176 pupils in the area. The school was established in 1975 and is the main primary school in the Strathfoyle (including Maydown) area. Many past and present students of the school have experience a degree of varying success locally and nationally, winning numerous quizzes, chess competitions, sporting events and other such education related topics. The school promotes a Catholic ethos and is situated beside St. Oliver Plunkett Chapel. The majority of post primary school students in Strathfoyle attend schools such as Oakgrove Integrated College, St. Mary's High School in Limavady, or St. Columb's College. Oakgrove Integrated College is located near to the village and is a popular choice among students due to its proximity to the village.

== Notable residents ==
- David Ogilby - Institute F.C. footballer

== See also ==
- List of villages in Northern Ireland
- List of towns in Northern Ireland
