= Lisbunny, County Londonderry =

Coordinates: 54.882°N 7.186°W

Lisbunny: Irish: Lios Buinighe
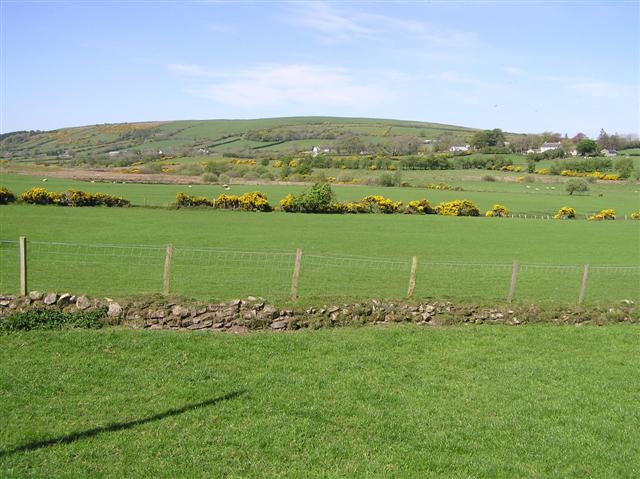
- Lisbunny townland in 2007

- Location within Northern Ireland
- District: Derry and Strabane
- County: County Londonderry
- Country: Northern Ireland
- Sovereign state: United Kingdom
- Postcode district: BT47
- Dialling code: 028
- UK Parliament: Foyle
- NI Assembly: Foyle

Lisbunny (from Irish Lios Buinighe, meaning 'fort of the flood') is a townland of 849 acres in County Londonderry, Northern Ireland, about 3 miles Claudy, near the County Tyrone/Londonderry border. It is situated within Derry and Strabane district as well as the civil parish of Cumber Upper and the historic barony of Tirkeeran.

It is a rural farming area with few amenities, although it does contain a stone quarry.

== See also ==
- List of townlands in County Londonderry
