= List of metropolitan areas in Ireland =

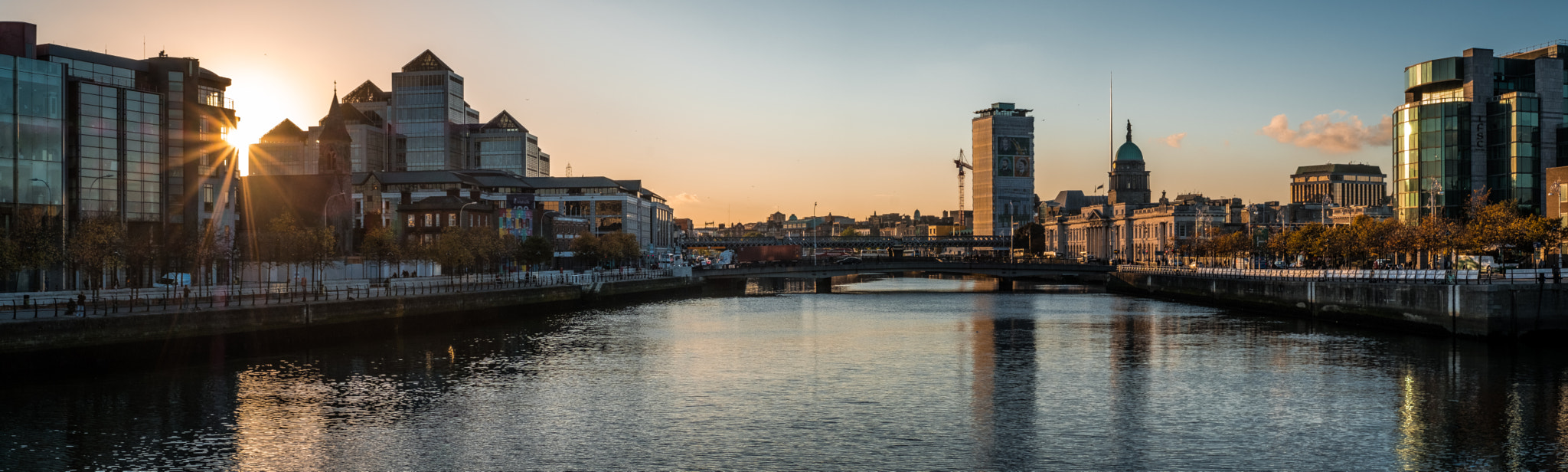
Ireland's biggest city, Dublin

A list of metropolitan areas located on the island of Ireland.

Name	Population	Country	County(s)
Dublin	2,082,575	Republic of Ireland	Dublin, Kildare, Meath, Wicklow
Belfast	671,559	Northern Ireland	Antrim, Down
Cork	406,785	Republic of Ireland	Cork
Derry	237,000	Northern Ireland	Derry
Limerick	162,413	Republic of Ireland	Limerick, Clare
Galway	85,910	Republic of Ireland	Galway
Waterford	82,963	Republic of Ireland	Waterford, Kilkenny
Drogheda	67,114	Republic of Ireland	Louth, Meath
Dundalk	64,287	Republic of Ireland	Louth
