= Lisbunny =

Lisbunny may refer to:

- Lisbunny, County Londonderry, a townland in County Londonderry, Northern Ireland
- Lisbunny, County Tipperary, a townland and civil parish in County Tipperary, Ireland
