= Killaloo =

- Village
- Coordinates: 54.927662°N 7.195025°W

Killaloo (from Irish Coill a' Lao, meaning 'wood of the calf' or Cill Dhalua meaning "Dalua's church") is a small village and townland in County Londonderry, Northern Ireland. It is about six miles southeast of Derry, on the main Derry to Belfast road. In the 2021 census, Killaloo had a population of 64 people. It is situated within Derry and Strabane district.

The nearest shops and amenities are in the village of Claudy, to the southeast. Derry is 7 miles (11 km) to the north-west.

== Places of interest ==
The ruins of Brackfield Bawn are beside the main road. The Ness Woods country park is also in the area.

== Gallery ==
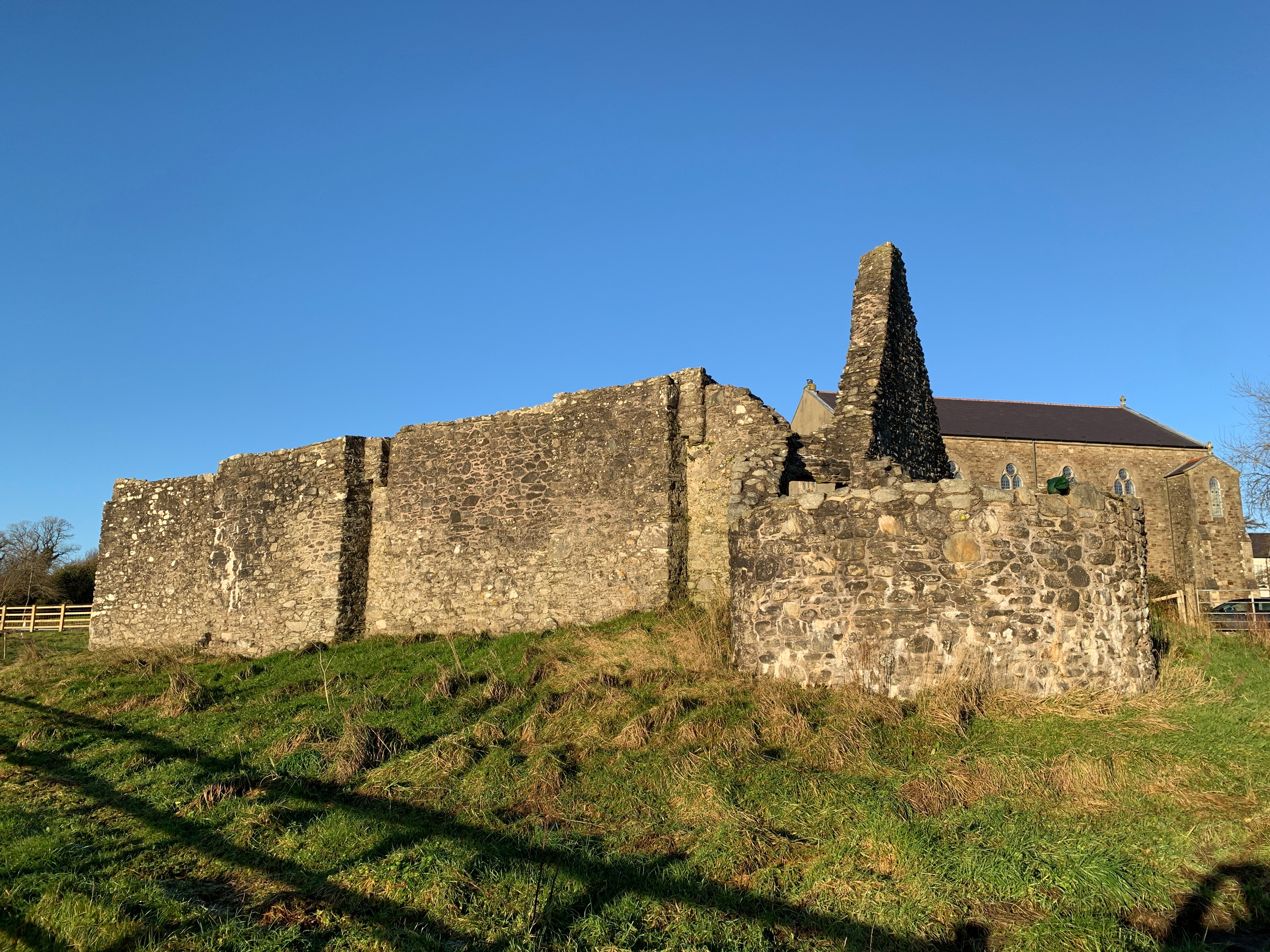
Brackfield Bawn

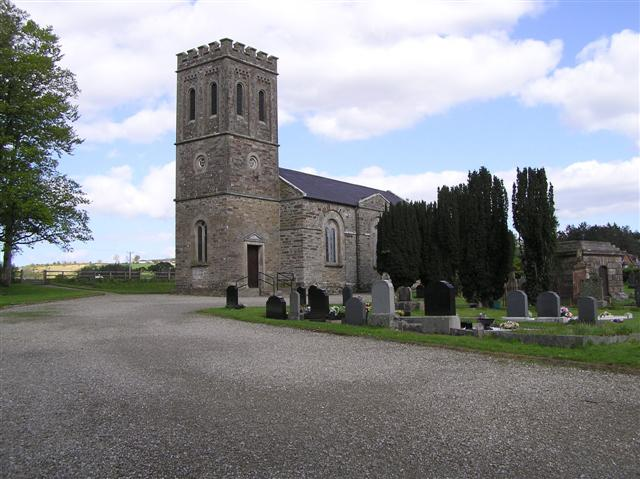
Cumber Church of Ireland, Killaloo

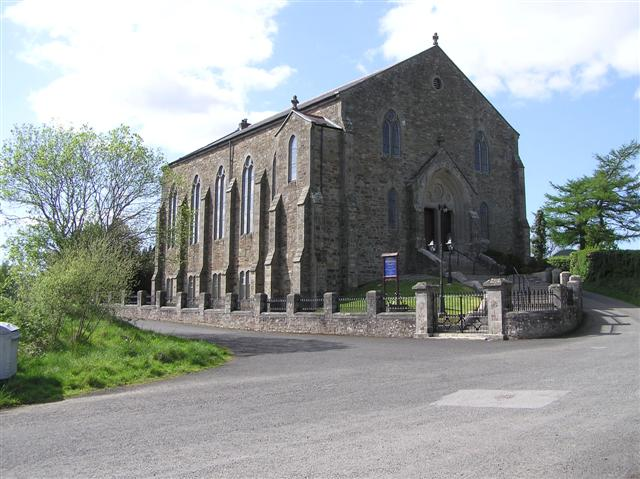
The Presbyterian church
