= Errigal civil parish =

Civil parish in County Londonderry, Northern Ireland

Coordinates: 54.953°N 6.732°W

Errigal civil parish is located in County Londonderry, Northern Ireland.

== Townlands ==
The parish comprises the following townlands in County Londonderry

- Altduff
- Ballintemple
- Ballyrogan
- Belraugh
- Boleran
- Brockagh
- Brockaghboy
- Cah
- Coolcoscreaghan
- Coolnasillagh
- Crockindollagh
- Drumbane
- Dunnavenny
- Farrantemple Glebe
- Freugh
- Garvagh
- Glenkeen
- Gortfad
- Gortnamoyagh
- Inshaleen
- Liscall
- Lisnascreghog
- Mettican Glebe
- Slaghtaverty
- Tamnymore
- Tibaran

== See also ==
- List of civil parishes of County Londonderry
- List of townlands in County Londonderry
