= Altaghoney =

Coordinates: 54°51′33″N 7°10′43″W

Altaghoney: Irish: Alt a Chonnaidh
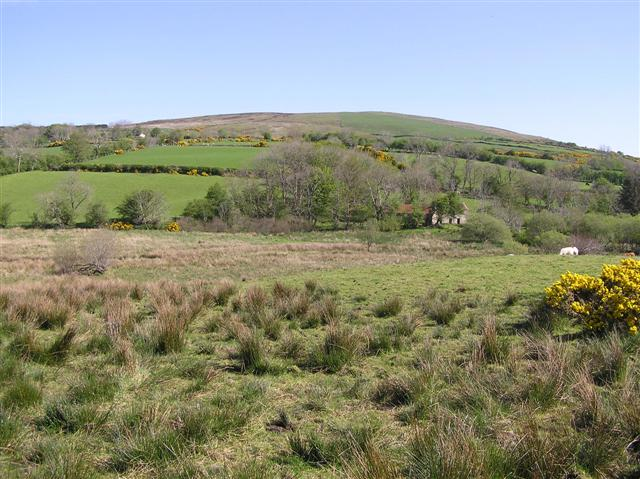
- Altaghoney townland in 2007

- Location within Northern Ireland
- County: County Londonderry
- Country: Northern Ireland
- Sovereign state: United Kingdom
- Postcode district: BT47
- Dialling code: 028

Altaghoney (from Irish Alt a Chonnaidh, meaning 'glen of the firewood') is townland of 1,163 acres in County Londonderry, Northern Ireland. It is situated in the civil parish of Cumber Upper and the historic barony of Tirkeeran.

== Archaeology ==
Altaghoney contains a stone circle at grid ref: C515013. It also contains a cross at grid ref: C5371 0192 which is registered as a Scheduled Historic Monument.

== See also ==
- List of townlands in County Londonderry
