= Altnagelvin =

Townland in County Londonderry, Northern Ireland

Altnagelvin Irish: Allt Mhic Dhuibhleacháin
- townland

Irish transcription(s)
  - Derivation: Alt na nGealbhán
  - Meaning: "Glen/height of the sparrows"
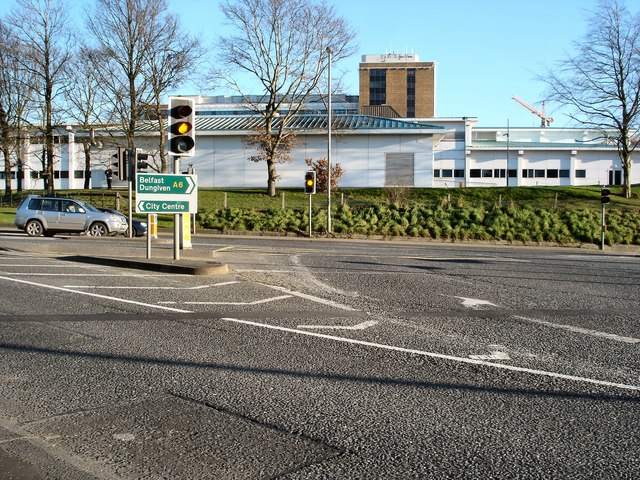
- Altnagelvin Junction, which in 2004 saw 12930 vehicles pass through every day. Altnagelvin Area Hospital is in the background.

- Altnagelvin shown within Northern Ireland Altnagelvin (the United Kingdom)
- Coordinates: 54°58′52″N 7°17′17″W
- Sovereign state: United Kingdom
- Country: Northern Ireland
- County: Londonderry
- Barony: Tirkeeran
- Civil parish: Clondermot
- Settlements: Derry

Government
  - Council: Derry and Strabane
  - Ward: Altnagelvin

Area
  - Total: 293.3 acres (118.69 ha)

Altnagelvin (from Irish Alt na nGealbhán, meaning 'Glen/height of the sparrows') is a townland in County Londonderry, Northern Ireland. It is also the name of an electoral ward in Derry and Strabane district. Formerly a small village, it has been absorbed into the Waterside neighbourhood of Derry. Within Altnagelvin is Altnagelvin Area Hospital, a large hospital that serves most of the county.

The townland is on the southeastern outskirts of Derry city, and the busy A6 road from Belfast to Derry passes through it.

== Demographics ==
On Census Day 29 April 2001 the resident population of Altnagelvin ward was 4477. Of these:

- 26.6% were under 16 years old and 11.0% were aged 60 and above
- 48.3% of the population were male and 51.7% were female
- 38.0% were from a Roman Catholic background and 59.7% were from a Protestant background
- 5.2% of those aged 16–74 were unemployed
