= David Ogilby (footballer) =

Northern Irish footballer

Personal information
- Full name: David Ogilby
- Date of birth: 2 June 1984 (age 42)
- Place of birth: Derry, Northern Ireland
- Position: Centre back

Youth career
- Tristar Boys
- Foyle Harps

Senior career*
Years	Team	Apps	(Gls)
2000	Lisahally	2	(0)
2000–2010	Institute	242	(6)
2010–2018	Coleraine	199	(16)
2018–	Lisahally	0	(0)

International career
- Northern Ireland U23
- * Club domestic league appearances and goals

David Ogilby (born 2 June 1984) is a Northern Irish footballer.

== Career ==
=== Youth ===
Ogilby was born in Derry and grew up in the village of Strathfoyle. Ogilby joined local youth team Moorfield at Under 10 level and continued playing with them to under 16 level. Ogilby then signed for Lisahally. It was at Lisahally where he was asked to play for the Institute youth team and subsequently progressed through to the first team.

=== Institute ===
After playing only two games for Lisahally, Burns sent Ogilby on trial to Institute F.C. On 30 January 2008, Derry City expressed keen interest, with hope of landing Ogilby before the end of the British Transfer Window. The transfer, however, did not go through in time, as negotiations broke down before the transfer window closed (at midnight, 31 January). Sources in the media have reported that the breakdown was largely due to the reluctance of the Institute board to let the player go. It is thought that Ogilby was valued at £15,000, a fee which Derry City may have considered too high.

=== Coleraine ===
In August 2010, Ogilby joined Coleraine for an undisclosed fee. Over his eight-year tenure with the club, during which he served as a captain, Ogilby made a total of 233 appearances. He scored 18 times and was a member of the Bannsiders' 2018 Irish Cup success.

== Other clubs ==
Ogilby represented Northern Ireland at under 23 level and played for the Northern Ireland B team. Upon his departure from Coleraine, he returned to play for Lisahally.
