= List of civil parishes of County Londonderry =

In Ireland Counties are divided into Civil Parishes and Parishes are further divided into townlands. The following is a list of parishes in County Londonderry, Northern Ireland:

== A ==
Aghadowey, Aghanloo, Agivey, Arboe, Artrea

== B ==
Ballinderry, Ballyaghran, Ballymoney, Ballynascreen, Ballyrashane, Ballyscullion, Ballywillin, Balteagh, Banagher, Bovevagh

== C ==
Carrick, Clondermot, Coleraine, Cumber Lower, Cumber Upper

== D ==
Derryloran, Desertlyn, Desertmartin, Desertoghill, Drumachose, Dunboe, Dungiven

== E ==
Errigal

== F ==
Faughanvale, Formoyle

== G ==
Grange of Scullion

== K ==
Kilcronaghan, Kildollagh, Killelagh, Killowen, Kilrea

== L ==
Learmount, LissanLavey

== M ==
Macosquin, Maghera, Magherafelt, Magilligan or Tamlaghtard

== T ==
Tamlaght, Tamlaght Finlagan, Tamlaght O'Crilly, Templemore, Termoneeny

== See also ==
- List of townlands in County Londonderry
