= Bovevagh =

Civil parish in County Londonderry, Northern Ireland

Coordinates: 54.967°N 6.949°W

Bovevagh is a civil parish in County Londonderry, Northern Ireland.

== Townlands ==
The civil parish contains the following townlands:

- Ardinarive
- Ballyharigan
- Ballymoney
- Bonnanaboigh
- Bovevagh
- Camnish
- Derryard
- Derrylane
- Derrynaflaw
- Derryork
- Drumadreen
- Drumaduff
- Drumneechy
- Farkland
- Flanders
- Formil
- Glebe
- Glenconway
- Gortaclare
- Gortnahey Beg
- Gortnahey More
- Killibleught
- Leeke
- Muldonagh
- Straw

== See also ==
- List of civil parishes of County Londonderry
