= Corick =

Irish megalithic archaeological site

Coordinates: 54.748°N 6.791°W

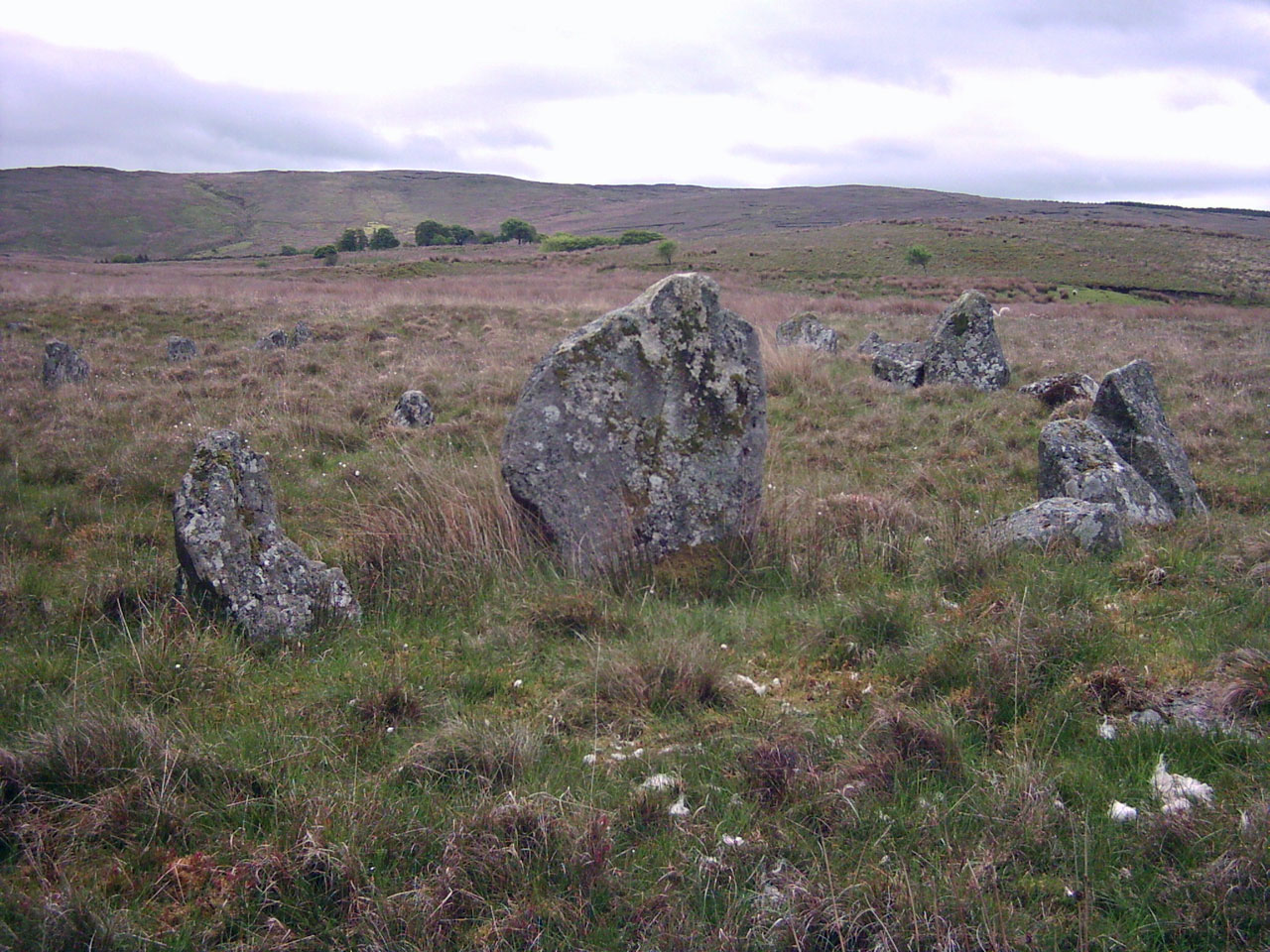
Stone circle.

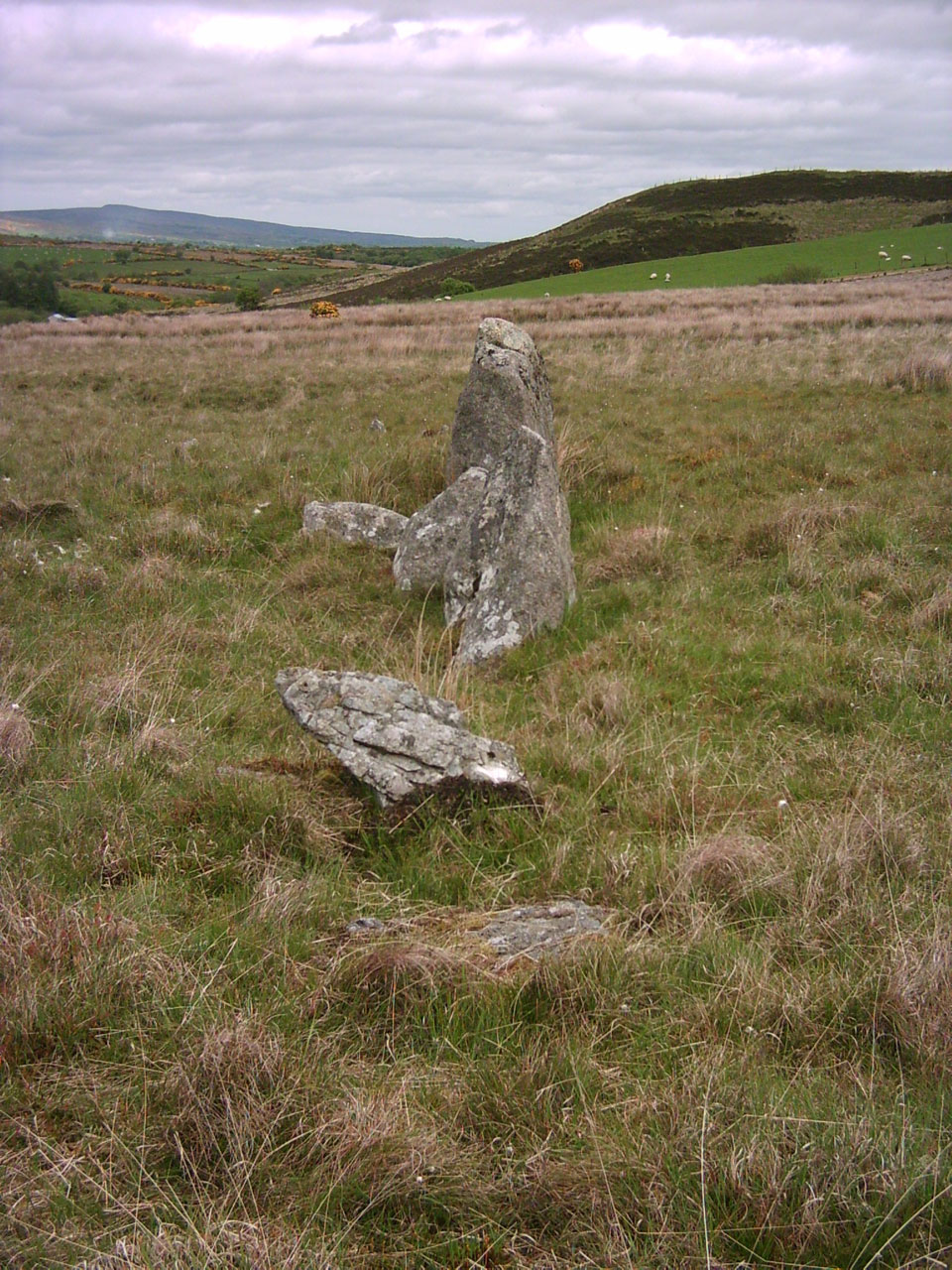
Stone row.

Corick (from Irish Comhrac 'confluence') is a megalithic site and townland in the civil parish of Ballynascreen, County Londonderry, Northern Ireland. It includes a stone circle and a stone row. The Corick stone circles and alignments are located 2 km north east of Ballybriest court-tomb, 400 metres south of Corick clachan, near a stream. The stone alignments and circle are Scheduled Historic Monuments in Corick at grid reference: Area of H780 896.

== Function ==
Although it is often believed the stone monuments were intentionally aligned to serve a greater purpose, the crudeness of the stones means that they could not have been used as advanced astronomical calculators. Their positioning therefore is more likely symbolic rather than functional.

== See also ==
- List of archaeological sites in County Londonderry
