= Enagh Lough =

Lake in Maydown, Northern Ireland

- Loch Eanach
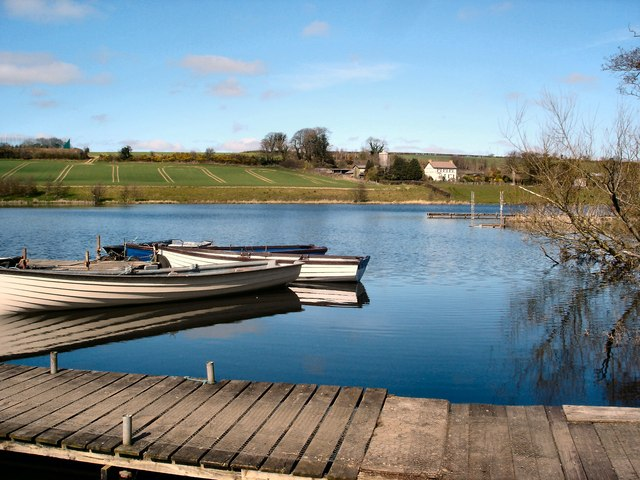

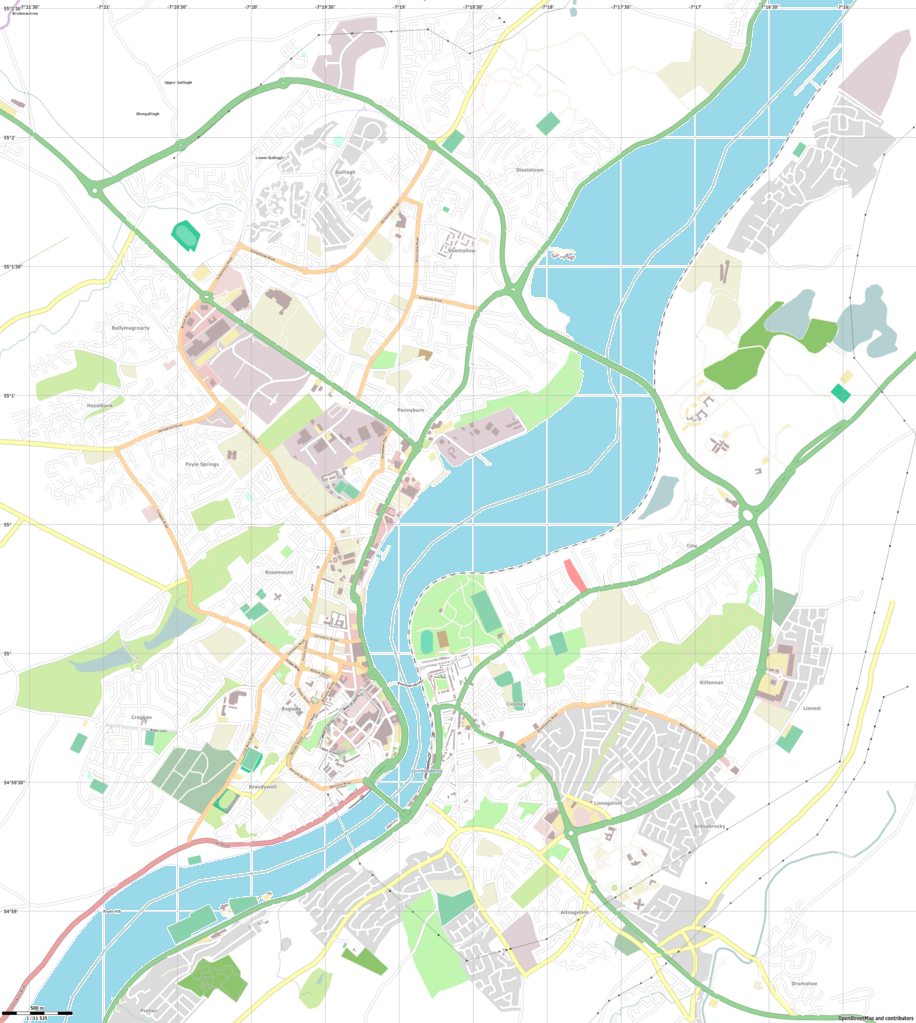
- Location within Derry
- Location: Maydown, County Londonderry, Northern Ireland
- Coordinates: 55°1′18″N 7°16′2″W
- Primary inflows: River Faughan
- Basin countries: Northern Ireland
- Islands: Green Island

Enagh Lough (from Irish Loch Eanach 'marshy lake') is a pair of lakes called East lake and Westlake, situated between Judges Road and Temple Road in Maydown, County Londonderry, Northern Ireland.

== Features ==
Under the surface at the bottom of the lake there is ice age water. The Honourable The Irish Society have leased the fishing rights to the local Enagh Country Park Enterprises as many local residents use the area for angling and walking. Enagh Lough is an outstanding area of natural beauty, with vivid wildlife including red squirrels and Pipistrelle bats, both of which are fast becoming scarce in Northern Ireland. Also situated on the lough is Green Island, also known as Templetown Island or Enagh Crannog, which is accessible by wading.

== History ==
Green Island was created by a clan from Dungiven. The Bishop of Derry once hid on the island in a tower as he was a wanted man by some. The island is recognised by the Northern Ireland Environment Agency as a historical monument. All around the lough is hidden history, and just a short walk away is the Enagh Trout Fishery and old graveyard. Strathfoyle Youth Forum are currently working with local wildlife and environmental organisations such as the Ulster Wildlife Trust, in hope that the areas wildlife can be protected and walkways and fishing jetties created.

On 29 August 1944, during World War II a Royal Navy Fairey Barracuda (DP872) was returning to its base at East Haven, Angus, Scotland from RNAS Maydown (HMS Shrike). The aircraft crashed into Enagh Lough with the loss of all three crew. In May 1971, there was a huge Naval recovery operation to find the wreckage of the aircraft.

In August 2022 two 16-year-old boys drowned in the lough.
