= Macosquin =

Village in County Londonderry, Northern Ireland

Coordinates: 55.100°N 6.707°W

Macosquin: Irish: Maigh Choscáin
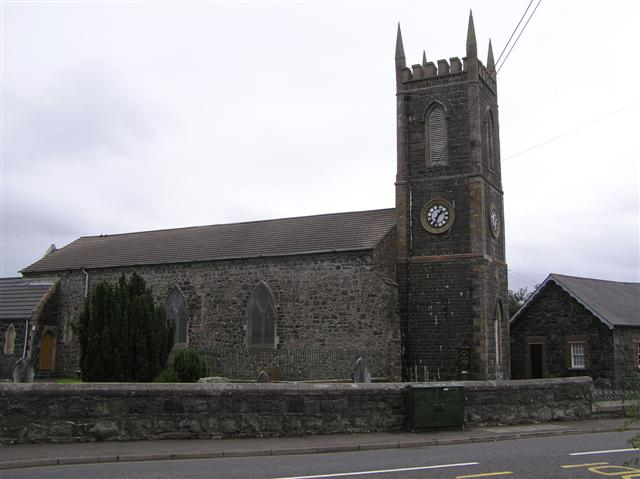
- St Mary's Church of Ireland

- Location within Northern Ireland
- Population: 604
- Irish grid reference: C824287
  - Belfast: 57 mi (92 km)
- District: Causeway Coast and Glens
- County: County Londonderry
- Country: Northern Ireland
- Sovereign state: United Kingdom
- Post town: COLERAINE
- Postcode district: BT51
- Dialling code: 028
- UK Parliament: Londonderry East
- NI Assembly: Londonderry East

Macosquin (from Irish Maigh Choscáin, meaning 'Coscan's plain') is a small village, townland, and civil parish in County Londonderry, Northern Ireland. It is 4 kilometres (2.5 mi) south-west of Coleraine, on the road to Limavady. In the 2021 Census it had a population of 604 people. The area is known for its caves and springs. It is situated within Causeway Coast and Glens district.

== History ==
Following fast growth in the 1950s and 1960s the village had a peak population of over 800 in the 1970s, but this has shrunk to a 2021 population of 604.

== Churches ==
The nearest religious buildings in Macosquin village or district are:

- St. Mary's Church of Ireland Parish Church
- Macosquin Presbyterian Church
- Coleraine Gospel Hall

== 2001 Census ==
Macosquin is classified as a small village or hamlet by the NI Statistics and Research Agency (NISRA) (i.e. with population between 500 and 1,000 people). On Census day 2011 there were 614 people living in Macosquin. Of these:

- 36.97% were aged under 16 years and 18.89% were aged 60 and over
- 48.53% of the population were male and 51.46% were female
- 3.09% were from a Catholic background, 82.57% were from a Protestant background, and 9.6% considered themselves as having ‘no religion’
- 2.93% of people aged 16–74 were unemployed

For more details see: NI Neighbourhood Information

== See also ==
- List of civil parishes of County Londonderry
