= Derry Urban Area =

Coordinates: 54.994°N 7.326°W

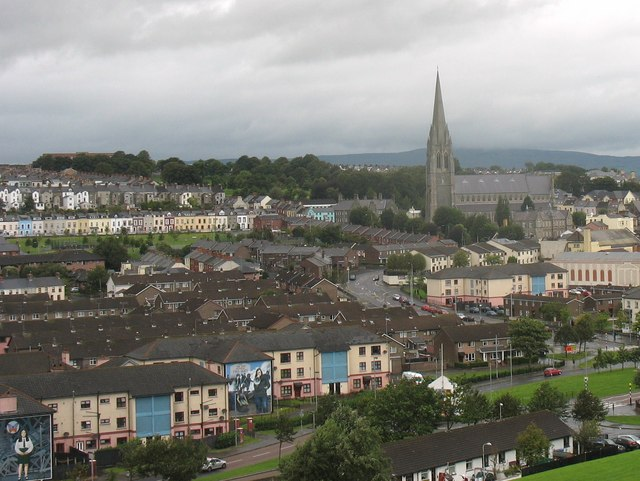
View of Derry including St Eugene's Roman Catholic Cathedral

The Derry Urban Area is the urban area that includes and surrounds the city of Derry in Northern Ireland, and is part of the Derry City and Strabane District Council area. It had a population of 93,512 in the 2001 census. It is the second-largest urban area in Northern Ireland (after Belfast) and the fifth-largest urban area in Ireland (after Dublin, Belfast, Cork and Limerick).

The Derry Urban Area consists of Derry City, Culmore, New Buildings and Strathfoyle.

The Greater Derry area, the area within about 20 mi (32.2 km) of the city, has a population of 237,000 and comprises Derry City Council, Limavady Borough Council, Strabane District council excluding the Castlederg area, and parts of North East Donegal in the Republic of Ireland, namely Inishowen, Letterkenny, Ballybofey and Stranorlar and Lifford. The term, like the term Greater Belfast, has no official relevance particularly in this case, since it incorporates areas from two jurisdictions; however, it is used for ease of reference.
