= Feeny =

Village in County Londonderry, Northern Ireland

Coordinates: 54.893°N 7.022°W

Feeny: Irish: Na Fíneadha
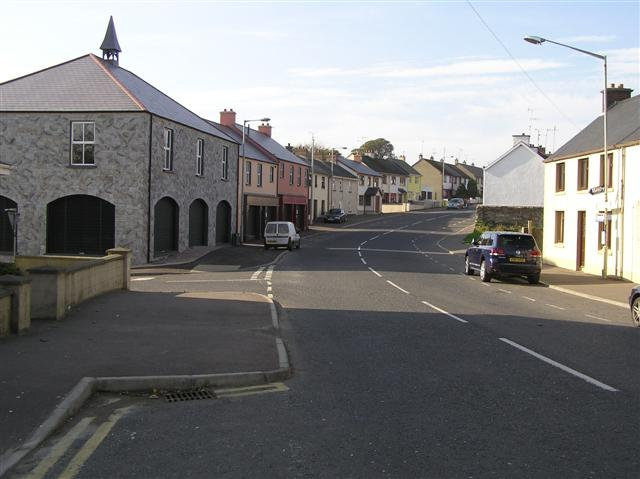

- Location within Northern Ireland
- Population: 690 (2011)
- Irish grid reference: C627055
  - Belfast: 58 miles
- District: Causeway Coast and Glens
- County: County Londonderry
- Country: Northern Ireland
- Sovereign state: United Kingdom
- Post town: LONDONDERRY
- Postcode district: BT47
- Dialling code: 028, +44 28
- UK Parliament: East Londonderry
- NI Assembly: East Londonderry

Feeny (from Irish Na Fíneadha 'the woods') is a village and townland in County Londonderry, Northern Ireland. It is between Dungiven and Claudy. In the 2011 Census it had a population of 690. Feeny lies just inside the boundary of the Sperrins Area of Outstanding Natural Beauty. It is situated within Causeway Coast and Glens district.

== Features ==
Feeny has a health centre, community centre and Gaelic Athletic Association club. However, it only has a small number of shops. There are two pubs in the village, commonly referred to as the top bar and bottom bar due to their location on the hill of main street. It has a population of around 690 in 2011.

A community regeneration project has been proposed for the village, funded by the International Fund for Ireland. The project, to be undertaken by Feeny Community Association, involves redeveloping a derelict site in the village centre to commercial premises, three apartments and a community office. This will be alongside an environmental improvement scheme in Main Street, which would create a stronger commercial centre, more jobs, and improve the appearance of the village.

== History ==
Near the village is the General's Bridge, the site of the famous ambush by highwayman Shane Crossagh. This is where Sean Crossan held up some British Redcoats by placing wooden cut-out muskets into some bushes.

During the Troubles, off-duty Ulster Defence Regiment soldier James Hood was killed by the Provisional Irish Republican Army (IRA) at his house near Feeny on 4 January 1973.

== Places of interest ==
On the outskirts of the village, towards Dungiven, lies four-storey Drumcovitt House which was built over 300 years ago by the Worshipful Company of Fishmongers and is a visible reminder of the Plantation of Ulster period. In 1796 a round ended Georgian front was added to the house. It is now tourist accommodation.

Banagher Glen National Nature Reserve is also close to the village, and Aughlish stone circles and alignments are approximately 3 km from Feeny.

About a mile outside the village is the Owenbeg River a significant tributary to the River Roe can be seen from a layby at the bridge between Feeny and Dungiven.

== Transport ==
Feeny has good road links to Limavady (20 km to the north) and Derry (23 km to the northwest), but has limited public transport connections.

== Education ==
St Canice's is the local primary school.

== Sport ==
Gaelic games are the most popular sports in the area, with St Mary's GAC Banagher (CLG Naomh Mhuire Beannchar) being the local club. Fr McNally Park is the team's grounds.

== Demography ==
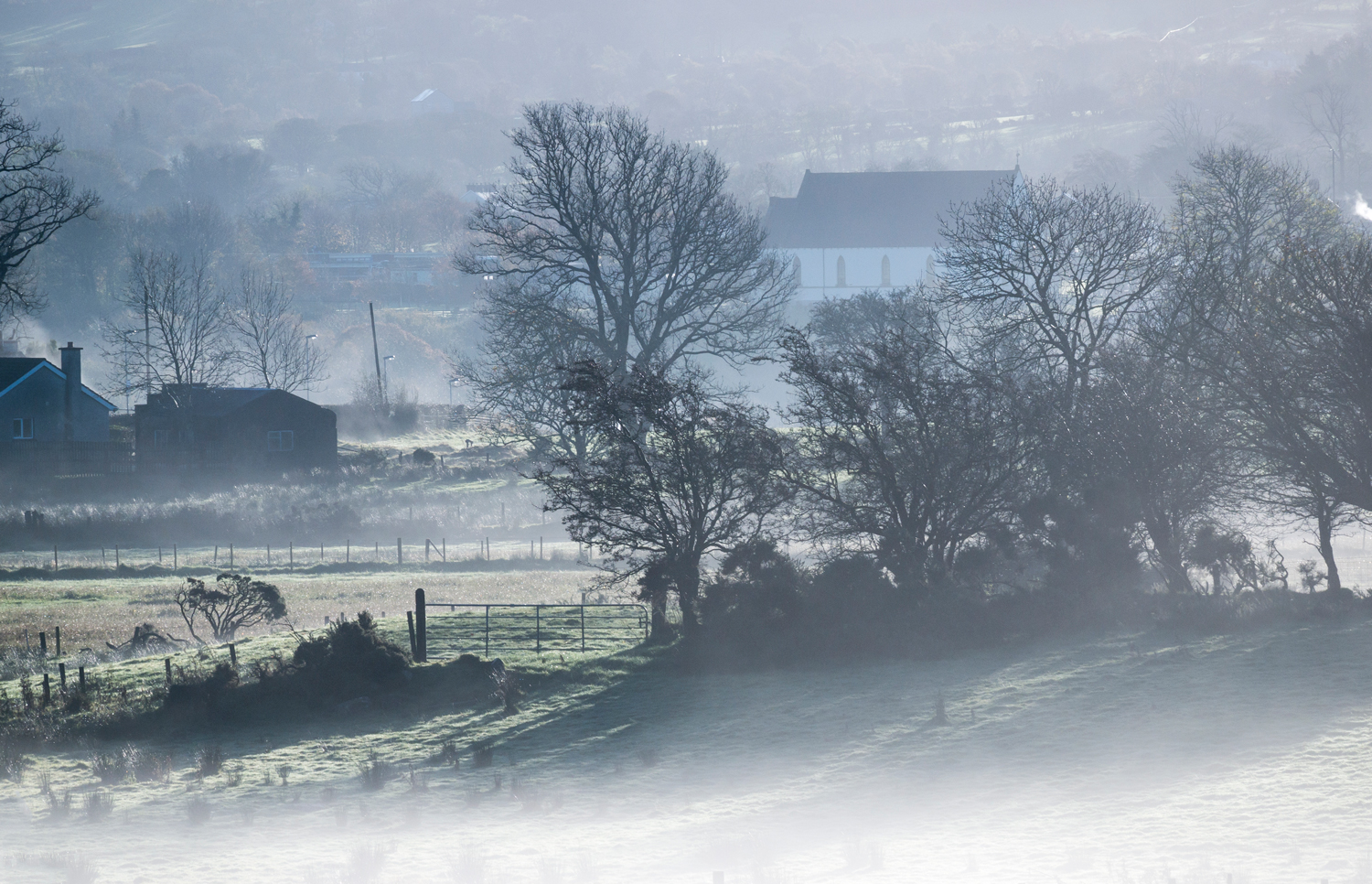
St. Joseph's Chapel, Feeny

Feeny is classified as a small village or hamlet by the NI Statistics and Research Agency (NISRA) (i.e., with population between 500 and 1,000). On Census day (27 March 2011) there were 690 people living in Feeny. Of these:

- 29.3% were aged under 16 years and 6.6% were aged 60 and over
- 47.6% of the population were male and 52.4% were female
- 94.3% were from a Catholic background and 5.4% were from a Protestant background
- 7.8% of people aged 16–74 were unemployed

The century of political and religious turmoil in modern-day Northern Ireland has seen the village of Feeny move from a mixed village to being almost exclusively Nationalist.

In the 1911 Census the village recorded 149 inhabitants of whom 64 were from a Protestant background. The village had a demographic that was 57.1% Roman Catholic and 42.9% Protestant. Over the course of the century while the overall population of the village quadrupled in size the minority Protestant population had shrunk to just 20 inhabitants in the 2001 Census. This 39% fall in the Protestant community over the century is the third largest deterioration of a community from either side of Ulster's political divide in any village or district of over one hundred inhabitants behind the sharp declines of the Protestant communities of Derry City and Dungiven Village and marginally higher than the sharpest decline of a Roman Catholic community, experienced in Castlereagh.
