= Maydown =

Village in County Londonderry, Northern Ireland

Coordinates: 55.023°N 7.244°W

Maydown: Irish: Magh Dúin
- Location within Northern Ireland
- Population: 578 (2001 Census)
- District: Derry and Strabane
- County: County Londonderry
- Country: Northern Ireland
- Sovereign state: United Kingdom
- Postcode district: BT
- Dialling code: 028
- Police: Northern Ireland
- Fire: Northern Ireland
- Ambulance: Northern Ireland
- UK Parliament: Foyle
- NI Assembly: Foyle

Maydown (from Irish Magh Dúin meaning "plain of the stronghold") is a small village and townland in County Londonderry, Northern Ireland. It is near Derry and Strathfoyle and is within the Derry and Strabane district. In the 2001 Census, it had a population of 270 people.

== Industry ==
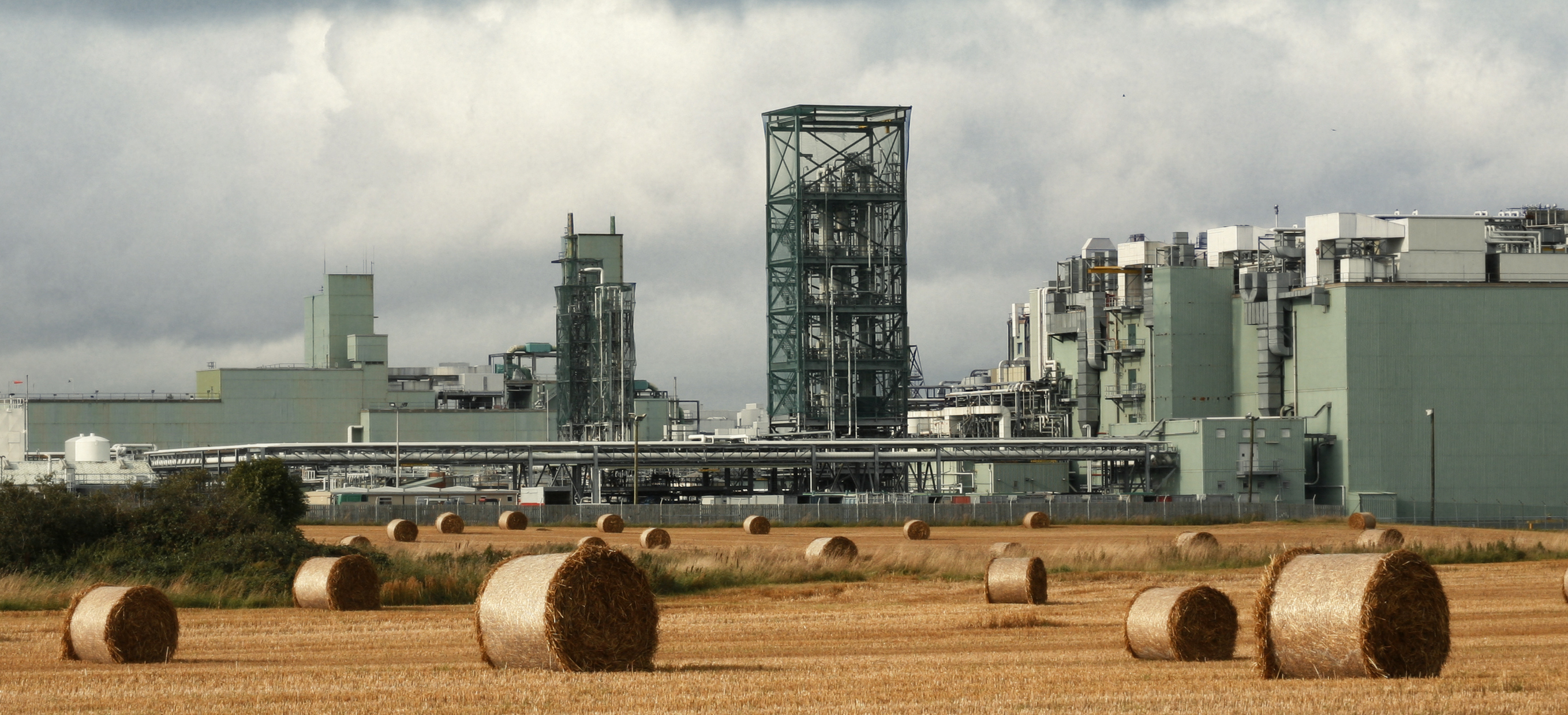
DuPont plant

Maydown is an industrial zone and was the site of the first DuPont production facility in Europe. DuPont first invented Kevlar in 1965 and its Maydown manufacturing facility is one of only three places in the world where Kevlar is produced.

The DuPont site at Maydown is now the lead partner in the University of Ulster's Biodiversity Action on Industrial Site (BAIS) project that aims to enhance biodiversity on land close to industrial activity. DuPont has developed 116 acres (0.47 km^{2}) of its Maydown site into wildlife habitats open to the public and a visitor centre used by local schools.

Maydown Precision Engineering was established in 1985.

== Places of interest ==
It was also the site of Royal Air Force Station Maydown, USAAF airfield and later transferred to the Royal Navy as Royal Naval Air Station airfield, RNAS Maydown, during World War II.

== Sport ==
Maydown F.C. is the local football team.

== 2011 Census ==
On Census day in 2011:

- 57.5% were from a Catholic background and 38.9% were from a Protestant background
