= Straw, County Londonderry =

Village in County Londonderry, Northern Ireland

Straw
- Village and townland
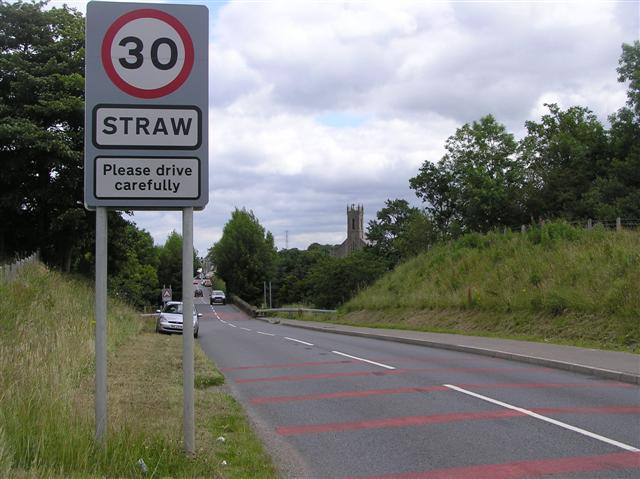
- Entering Straw on the B47

- Location in Northern Ireland
- Coordinates: 54.784°N 6.807°W

Straw (from Irish Srath 'wide valley') is a small village and townland in County Londonderry, Northern Ireland. In the 2021 Census it had a population of 416. It is situated within Mid-Ulster District approximately one mile south-west of Draperstown.

The local church is St. Columba's Catholic Church and the local school is St. Columba's Primary School.

== See also ==
- List of townlands in County Londonderry
