= Cumber Upper =

Civil parish in County Londonderry, Northern Ireland

Cumber Upper is a civil parish in County Londonderry, Northern Ireland. It is mainly situated in the historic barony of Tirkeeran, with one townland (Stranagalwilly) in the barony of Strabane Lower.

== Towns and villages ==
The civil parish contains the village of Craigbane.

== Townlands ==
The civil parish contains the following townlands:

- Alla Lower
- Alla Upper
- Altaghoney
- Ballyartan
- Ballycallaghan
- Ballyholly
- Ballymaclanigan
- Ballyrory
- Barr Cregg
- Binn
- Carnanbane
- Carnanreagh
- Claudy
- Coolnacolpagh
- Cregg
- Cregg Barr
- Cumber
- Dunady
- Dungorkin
- Gilky Hill
- Glenlough
- Gortilea
- Gortnaran
- Gortnaskey
- Gortscreagan
- Kilcaltan
- Kilculmagrandal
- Kilgort
- Killycor
- Kinculbrack
- Lear
- Letterlogher
- Lettermuck
- Ling
- Lisbunny
- Mulderg
- Raspberry Hill
- Sallowilly
- Stranagalwilly
- Tireighter
- Tullintrain

== See also ==
- List of civil parishes of County Londonderry
