= Derrynaflaw =

Village in County Londonderry, Northern Ireland

- village and townland
- Coordinates: 54.927°N 6.965°W

Derrynaflaw (likely from Irish Doire na Flatha, meaning 'the oakgrove of the chief'), also known as Dernaflaw, is a small village and townland in County Londonderry, Northern Ireland. It is about 2 kilometres west of Dungiven on the Foreglen Road. It is designated as a Hamlet and in the 2001 Census it had a population of 168 people. It lies within Causeway Coast and Glens district.

== Features ==
The Foreglen Road bisects the settlement creating two separate housing clusters (old and new Derrynaflaw). It has basic community facilities. Recent private sector housing development complements the longer established public authority housing.

The Owenbeg River a tributary to the River Roe flows just below the village passing under the Old Owenbeg Bridge.

== Education ==
- St John's Primary School
