= Aughlish =

Townland and archaeological site in County Londonderry, Northern Ireland

Coordinates: 54.896°N 7.041°W

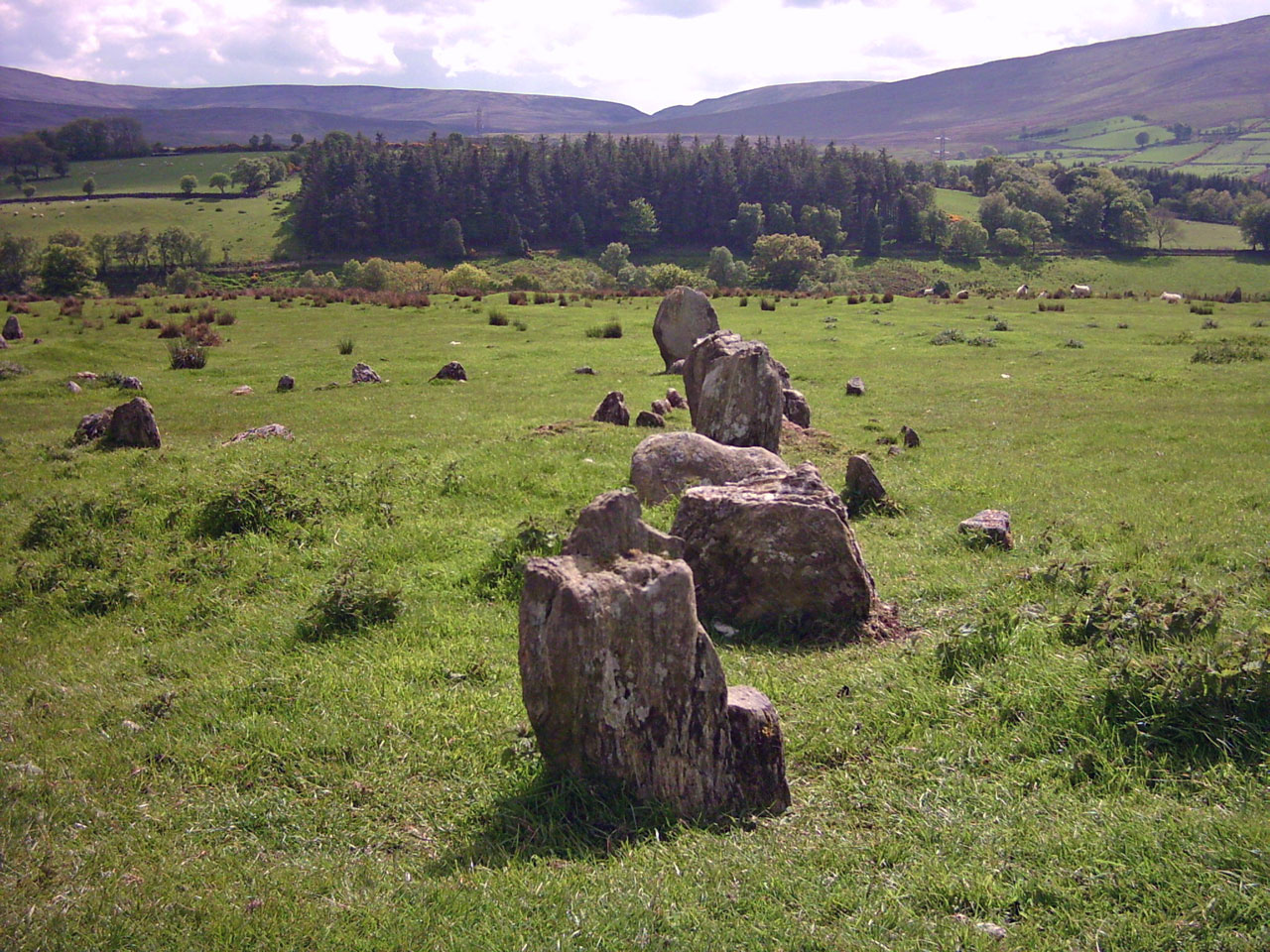
Early archaeoastronomy began by surveying alignments of Megalithic stones in the British Isles and sites like Aughlish in County Londonderry in an attempt to find statistical patterns. The stone row above faces the southernmost setting point of the Moon.

Aughlish (also Auglish) is a townland and the site of at least six stone circles and two stone rows, in County Londonderry, Northern Ireland, 3.6 km from Feeny.

== Features ==
The site features a group of circles including one with 41 small stones and a fallen stone 150 cm high at the south, with another of the same height outside the circle to the north. There are three other circles (or parts of circles) with alignments, one of which stretches for 18m.

Aubrey Burl considers the site to be typical of Irish Bronze Age ritual sites around the Sperrins, the local range of hills. He argues that the layout of the stone circles and rows indicates connections with circle builders in England, Scotland and elsewhere in Northern Ireland.
