= Tirkeeran =

Barony in County Londonderry, Northern Ireland

Tirkeeran Irish: Tír Mhic Caoirthinn
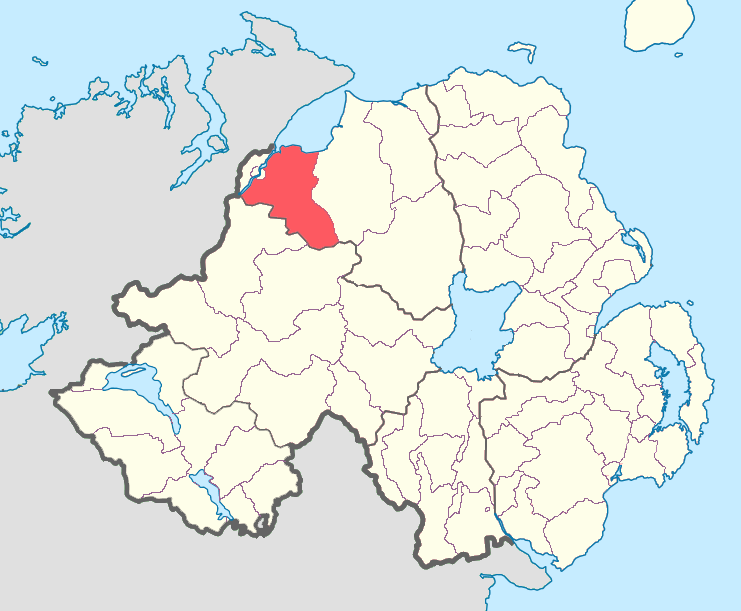
- Location of Tirkeeran, County Londonderry, Northern Ireland.
- Sovereign state: United Kingdom
- Country: Northern Ireland
- County: Londonderry

Tirkeeran (from Irish Tír Mhic Caoirthinn 'Land of the Sons of Cartin') is a barony in County Londonderry, Northern Ireland. It connects to the north-Londonderry coastline, and is bordered by four other baronies: Keenaght to the east; Strabane Lower to the south-east; North West Liberties of Londonderry to the west; and Strabane Upper to the south.

== History ==
Tirkeeran derives its name from the territory of the Airgiallan clan Ui Mhic Carthainn (MacCarthain), one of the earliest tribes in the area based to the south-east of Locha Febail (Lough Foyle). The Uí Mhic Carthainn are claimed to descend from Forgo mac Carthainn, the great-great-grandson of Colla Uais.

Dunchad mac Ultain is cited as king of the Uí Meic Cairthinn in 677, when he was killed by the Cenél nEóghain king, Mael Fithrich. It was around this period that the Cenél nEóghain were attempting to expand eastwards from their homeland in Innishowen, in modern-day County Donegal and into central Ulster. Eventually, the Cenél nEóghain crushed the power and independence of the Uí Mhic Carthainn and subjugated them; however, it would remain in some minor form until the end of the 11th century, when the Annals cite "Conchobhor ua hAinniaraidh, king of Cianachta and Ua Cein king of the Ui Meic Carithinn fell by each other in combat".

Prior to the 13th century the septs of Ó Cairealláin (O'Carolan) and Mac Eiteagain (MacEttigan) are cited as ruling the territory of Clann Diarmatta (south-east of Lough Foyle), which contained the present-day parish of Clondermot (which derives its name from the territory). These septs descend from the Cenél nEóghain branch Clann Conchúir Magh Ithe (Clan Connor of Moy Ith), of which the O'Cahans were the principal sept and who would later dominate and rule a territory spanning the baronies of Tirkeeran, Keenaght, and Coleraine.

When the baronies of Ulster were being created by the English from 1585, the general manner was to name it after the principal town or castle lying within the area, in which they held their court, baron, and jail. This resulted in Firnacreeve being renamed as the barony of Coleraine, and Kinel-Ferady to the barony of Clogher. The 1591 inquisition which shired County Tyrone specified as one of its eight baronies "Anagh, conteyninge [containing] Tyrchyrine [Tirkeeran], Sgryn [Magilligan], and Clandermod [Clondermot]". The name Anagh was after the O'Cahans' castle, which stood on an island in Enagh Lough. Anagh was one of three baronies transferred from Tyrone to the new County Coleraine, which in turn was enlarged and renamed County Londonderry in 1613. The name of the barony was changed from Anagh to Tirkeeran some time between 1615 and 1639.

== List of settlements ==
Below is a list of settlements in Tirkeeran:

=== Cities and towns ===
- Derry (east of the River Foyle)

=== Villages ===
- Claudy
- Drumahoe
- Eglinton
- Feeny
- Greysteel
- Lettershendoney
- Newbuildings

=== Population centres ===
- Park
- Straidarran
- The Cross

== List of civil parishes ==
Below is a list of civil parishes in Tirkeeran:

- Banagher (split with barony of Keenaght)
- Clondermot
- Cumber Lower
- Cumber Upper (with one townland in barony of Strabane Lower)
- Faughanvale
- Slaughtmanus
- Learmount (split with barony of Strabane Lower)
