= Claudy =

Village in County Londonderry, Northern Ireland

Coordinates: 54°54′43″N 07°09′16″W

Claudy: Irish: Clóidigh; Scots: Tha Strang-rinnin Wattèr
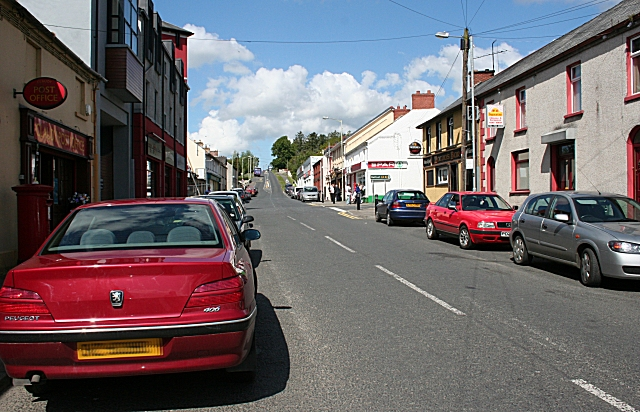
- Main Street in the village

- Location within Northern Ireland
- Population: 1,336 (2011 Census)
- Irish grid reference: C541075
  - Belfast: 62 mi (100 km)
- District: Derry and Strabane
- County: County Londonderry
- Country: Northern Ireland
- Sovereign state: United Kingdom
- Post town: LONDONDERRY
- Postcode district: BT47
- Dialling code: 028
- UK Parliament: East Londonderry

Claudy (from Irish Clóidigh, meaning 'the one who washes/the strong-flowing one') is a village and townland (of 1,154 acres) in County Londonderry, Northern Ireland. It lies in the Faughan Valley, 6 miles (9.7 km) southeast of Derry, where the River Glenrandal joins the River Faughan. It is situated in the civil parish of Cumber Upper and the historic barony of Tirkeeran. It is also part of Derry and Strabane district.

Claudy had a population of 1,336 people in the 2011 census. It has two primary schools, two churches and a college named St Patrick's and St. Brigid's College.

== History ==
During the Troubles in Northern Ireland, 13 people were killed in or near the village of Claudy. Nine of these people (all civilians) — including a nine-year-old child — were killed in the Claudy bombing of 31 July 1972. In this incident three suspected Provisional Irish Republican Army (IRA) car bombs exploded almost simultaneously in Main Street. Inadequate warning was given, and no paramilitary group has ever admitted responsibility for the bombing. Of the other four people to be killed in Claudy, three were Protestant members of the security forces (two Ulster Defence Regiment and one Royal Ulster Constabulary), and all were killed by the IRA in separate incidents. The other person to be killed was a Catholic civilian killed by the Ulster Freedom Fighters. All 13 victims were killed during a relatively brief period, from 1972 to 1976.

Because of Claudy's small population, it has one of Northern Ireland's higher Troubles-related fatality rates. The 13 people killed there in the Troubles are equivalent to one per cent of the village's 2001 population; in comparison, the death rate in Belfast was equivalent to just over half a per cent of the city's 2001 population, and that in Derry a quarter of a per cent.

== Sport ==
- Claudy has a local Gaelic Athletic Association club, Claudy GAC.
- Claudy is home to two rival football clubs, Claudy United and Claudy Rovers.
- The village also has a local leisure centre called the Diamond Centre. It has sporting, gym, and ICT facilities.

== Demography ==
=== 2011 census ===
In the 2011 census, Claudy had a population of 1,340 people (504 households).

On census day 27 March 2011, in Claudy Settlement, considering the resident population:

- 99.10% were from the white (including Irish Traveller) ethnic group;
- 80.45% belong to or were brought up in the Catholic religion and 17.39% belong to or were brought up in a 'Protestant and Other Christian (including Christian related)' religion; and
- 22.24% indicated that they had a British national identity, 50.45% had an Irish national identity and 31.04% had a Northern Irish national identity.

=== 2001 census ===
Claudy is classified as a village by the Northern Ireland Statistics and Research Agency (NISRA) (i.e. with population between 1,000 and 2,250 people). On Census day (29 April 2001) there were 1,316 people living in Claudy. Of these:

- 26.7% were aged under 16 and 12.3% were aged 60 and over
- 49.1% of the population were male and 50.9% were female
- 77.9% were from a Catholic background and 21.4% were from a Protestant background
- 4.9% of people aged 16–74 were unemployed

== Education ==
- St. Patrick's and St. Brigid's College
- Cumber Claudy Primary School
- St Colmcilles Primary School and Nursery Unit

== NIMDM deprivation 2005 ==
Of 582 wards in Northern Ireland, Claudy is ranked 241st.

== See also ==
- List of towns and villages in Northern Ireland
- List of townlands in County Londonderry
