= Derry City and Strabane =

Local government district in Northern Ireland

Derry City and Strabane: Irish: Doire agus An Srath Bán; Ulster Scots: Derry Cittie an Stràbane
- District and borough
- Derry and Strabane shown within Northern Ireland
- Coordinates: 54.927°N 7.424°W
- Sovereign state: United Kingdom
- Country: Northern Ireland
- Incorporated: 1 April 2015
- Named after: Derry district and Strabane district

Government
  - Type: District council
  - Body: Derry City and Strabane District Council
  - Executive: Committee system
  - Control: No overall control

Area
  - Total: 478 sq mi (1,237 km^{2})
  - Rank: 6th

Population (2024)
  - Total: 152,383
  - Rank: 6th
  - Density: 320/sq mi (123/km^{2})
- Time zone: UTC+0 (GMT)
  - Summer (DST): UTC+1 (BST)
- Postcode areas: BT
- Dialling codes: 028
- ISO 3166 code: GB-DRS
- GSS code: N09000005
- Website: derrystrabane.com

Derry City and Strabane is a local government district that was created on 1 April 2015 by merging the City of Derry District and Strabane District. It covers most of the northwest of Northern Ireland. The local authority is Derry City and Strabane District Council.

== Geography ==
It is located in the northwest of Northern Ireland and includes parts of counties Londonderry and Tyrone, and borders County Donegal in the Republic of Ireland. The district had a population of 152,383 in 2024. The name of the new district was announced on 17 September 2008. Outside of Derry City the district is largely rural, containing a large swathe of the Sperrin Mountains which start at the market town of Strabane in County Tyrone.

=== Subdivisions ===
Derry City and Strabane district is made up of the following district electoral areas (2014), each comprising some local areas for the purposes of the district's local community planning:

- Ballyarnett: Culmore, Shantallow, Carnhill, Galliagh and Skeoge;
- Derg: Newtownstewart, Killeter, Sion Mills, Castlederg, Clady, Victoria Bridge, Ardstraw and part of Strabane Town local area;
- Faughan: Newbuildings, Eglinton, Claudy, Enagh, Magheramason, Campsie and Bready;
- Foyleside: Ballymagroarty, Foyle Springs, Northland, Rosemount, Springtown and Madam's Bank;
- Sperrin: Plumbridge, Artigarvan, Donemana, Park, Sperrin, Ballynamallaght, Cranagh and part of Strabane Town local area;
- The Moor: Creggan, Brandywell, City Walls and Sheriffs Mountain;
- Waterside: Drumahoe, Victoria, Caw, Ebrington, Kilfennan, Lisnagelvin and Clondermot.

== Local government ==
Derry City and Strabane District Council replaced Derry City Council and Strabane District Council. The first election for the new district was originally due to take place in May 2009, but in April 2008, Northern Ireland Secretary Shaun Woodward announced that the scheduled 2009 district council elections were to be postponed until 2011. The first elections took place on 22 May 2014 and the council acted as a shadow authority until 1 April 2015.

== Transport ==
The district is served by Derry~Londonderry railway station, operated by NI Railways. Its area was also formerly served by Eglinton railway station (closed in 1973), along the Belfast-Derry line.

== See also ==
- Local government in Northern Ireland
