= Clady, County Londonderry =

Village in County Londonderry, Northern Ireland

Coordinates: 54.8697°N 6.5085°W

Clady: Irish: Clóidigh
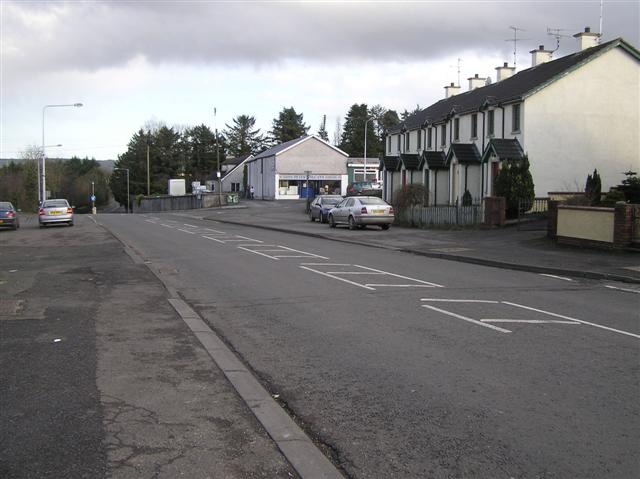

- Location within Northern Ireland
- Population: 517 (2021 Census)
- Country: Northern Ireland
- Sovereign state: United Kingdom
- Post town: BALLYMENA
- Postcode district: BT44
- Police: Northern Ireland
- Fire: Northern Ireland
- Ambulance: Northern Ireland

Clady (Irish: Clóidigh) is a small village in County Londonderry, Northern Ireland. It had a population of 517 people in the 2021 census. It is within the Mid-Ulster District area.

The village name comes from the Clady River, a major river in Northern Ireland.

== Schools ==
Clady currently has two schools, a primary (St. Mary's) and a secondary (St Conor's College) (formerly St Mary’s before a merger with St Paul’s in Kilrea)

== Rivers and bridges ==
The main river, also the towns namesake, is the Clady River which formally starts near Culnady when the Grillagh River and Knockoneil River both merge at a deep pool known locally as the Joinings Pool. Then the river flows on for about a mile and silently under the Eden Bridge which was built in 1959. At one point the river was natural and 2 to 3 times as wide until around the mid 20th century when the river underwent a major dredge operation to control the mass amount of floodwater not only from the hills of Slaughtneil but also William Clark & Sons of Upperlands coming from the sluice gates and flood gates. This work devastated the river as it was left like a canal only half its original width and twice its original depth with parts becoming over 10 feet deep. Onwards through Greenlough the river becomes natural once again. Its first sign arriving into Clady is the Waterwall and the home of the Clady And District Angling Club, one of the older angling clubs, which cover not only the Clady but also the Grillagh and Knockoneil. This club was funded in 1962. The river flows through Inishrush under the well known Footstick Bridge. The River flows on into some wild country through natural rock and weirs and flows over the weir built for Lagans Mill of Clady, as the river continues its journey it reaches Clady Bridge which is the oldest bridge on the river and also the largest one built circa 1700s. The river passes the mill and flows out of the wooded area, past rows of houses overlooking the river. The river then flows under the 3rd main bridge, that being the Glenone Bridge, an old Victorian stone bridge built circa 1800s which carries the main Clady Kilrea road. The river is now nearing the end of its course, flowing for the last few miles until emptying into the River Lower Bann.

== Sport ==
- Greenlough GAC is the local Gaelic Athletic Association club.

== 2011 census ==
On census day in 2011, the population of Clady was 562, of which:

- 23.1% were aged under 16 years and 12.3% were aged 65 and over
- 52% were male and 48% were female
- 95.4% were from a Catholic background and 3.9% were from a Protestant background

== See also ==
- List of towns in Northern Ireland
- List of villages in Northern Ireland
