= Henokiens =

Association of centuries-old family businesses

Henokiens Association
- Founded: 1981 (45 years ago)
- Founder: Gérard Glotin (fr)
- Type: Trade association
- Headquarters: Paris, France
- Website: henokiens.com

The Henokiens Association (French: l'Association des Hénokiens) is an international association of family-owned companies that have existed for two hundred years or more, with at least one family member still involved in management.

Its name is derived from the biblical patriarch Enoch (Hénoch in French), who lived for 365 years before he was taken by God instead of dying.

== History and operations ==
Founded in 1981 by the then-chairman of Marie Brizard, the association started with four members from France, and it now has fifty-six members from Europe and Japan. Its stated objective and raison d'être is to promote long-term decision making, notably through its Da Vinci Prize.

The association's oldest member is the Japanese Hōshi ryokan (founded in 717), and the most-recent members are the Austrian firm Lobmeyr (founded in 1823), the Portuguese firm Pinto Basto (founded in 1788), the French firm Tarrerias Bonjean (founded in 1585), the Italian firm Acetaia Giusti (founded in 1685), the French firm Denantes (founded in 1723), the Italian firm Colussi S.p.A. (founded in 1791), the Italian firm Leone de Castris (founded in 1665).

=== Members ===
The association includes fifty-seven members. Marie Brizard, having been bought by an investment fund in 2000, is no longer a member.

Name	Country	Founded	Trade
Acetaia Giusti	Italy	1605	balsamic vinegar of Modena producer
A. E. Köchert	Austria	1814	jewellery
Akafuku	Japan	1707	Japanese pastry
Amarelli	Italy	1731	liquorice manufacturer
Augustea	Italy	1629	sea shipping
Banque Hottinguer	France	1786	private banking
Banque Lombard Odier & Cie	Switzerland	1796	private banking
Banque Pictet & Cie	Switzerland	1805	private-wealth management, institutional-asset management, investment funds, asset services
Beretta	Italy	1526	arms manufacturer
Billecart Salmon	France	1818	Champagne
Bolloré	France	1822	transport & logistics, communication, electricity storage & systems
C. Hoare & Co	United Kingdom	1672	private banking
Cartiera Mantovana	Italy	1615	pulp and paper industry
Catherineau	France	1750	luxury aircraft completion
Fonderia Colbachini	Italy	1745	bell casting
Colussi	Italy	1791	bakery, pasta and chocolate sectors
De Kuyper Royal Distillers	The Netherlands	1698	liqueurs and alcoholic beverages
Denantes	France	1723	household linen
Descours & Cabaud	France	1786	industrial and buildings supplies
D'Ieteren	Belgium	1805	car distribution, automotive-glass services and notebooks
Ditta Bortolo Nardini	Italy	1779	distiller
Éditions Henry Lemoine	France	1772	music publisher
Etablissements Peugeot Frères	France	1810	industrial activities
Fratelli Piacenza	Italy	1733	wool mill
Schwarze & Schlichte	Germany	1664	spirits and liquors
Giobatta & Piero Garbellotto	Italy	1775	casks, barrels and vats
Gekkeikan	Japan	1637	sake producer
Grondona	Italy	1820	biscuits and cakes manufacturer
Guerrieri Rizzardi	Italy	1678	wine grower
H. Beligné & Fils	France	1610	cutlery trade
Hoshi	Japan	717	Ryokan hotel
Hugel & Fils	France	1639	wine grower
J. D. Neuhaus	Germany	1745	pneumatic and hydraulic chain hoists
Leone de Castris	Italy	1665	wine grower
Les Fils Dreyfus & Cie	Switzerland	1813	private banking
Lobmeyr	Austria	1823	glassware
Louis Latour	France	1797	wine grower
Luxardo	Italy	1821	liqueurs
Mellerio	France	1613	jewellery
Mirabaud	Switzerland	1819	private banking
Möller Group	Germany	1730	car-interior components and modules
Nabeya	Japan	1560	jig unit for metal cutting, vibration isolation products
Nakagawa Masashichi Shoten	Japan	1716	production and retail of household goods
Okaya & Co., Ltd.	Japan	1669	real estate
Pinto Basto	Portugal	1788	shipping transports, agents and assurance
Pollet	Belgium	1788	producer of ecologic and probiotic cleaning and hygiene solution
Revol Porcelaine	France	1789	porcelain cookware
Gradis 1685	Suisse	1685	sustainable finance
Tarrerias Bonjean	France	1585	cutlery
Thiercelin	France	1809	natural aromatic plants
Toraya Confectionery	Japan	1700s	Japanese pastry
Van Eeghen Group	The Netherlands	1662	functional health foods ingredients
Viellard Migeon & Cie	France	1796	fish, hooks, fasteners and welding product
Vitale Barberis Canonico	Italy	1663	fabrics
William Clark & Sons	Northern Ireland	1736	Irish linen
Yamamotoyama	Japan	1690	green tea and nori
Yamasa	Japan	1645	soy sauce and seasonings
Zaiso Lumber (jp)	Japan	1690	wood trade

== See also ==
- List of oldest banks in continuous operation
- List of oldest companies
- List of oldest companies in Australia
- List of oldest companies in the United States
