= Clady =

Clady may refer to:

- Clady, County Londonderry, a village in Northern Ireland
- Clady, County Tyrone, a small village in Northern Ireland
- Clady, County Antrim, a townland in County Antrim, Northern Ireland
- Clady, County Armagh, a rural area near Markethill
- Clady Circuit, a former motor-cycle racing course in County Antrim, Northern Ireland
- Clady River, Co. Donegal, Ireland
