= Upperlands =

Village in County Londonderry, Northern Ireland

Coordinates: 54.8769°N 6.6437°W

Upperlands: Irish: Áth an Phortáin
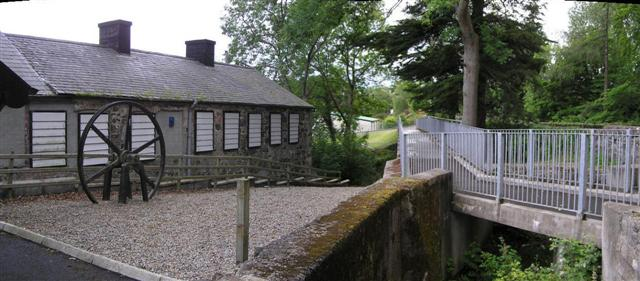
- The old mill in Upperlands, looking southwest

- Location within Northern Ireland
- Population: 561 (UK 2011 census)
- District: Mid Ulster
- County: County Londonderry
- Country: Northern Ireland
- Sovereign state: United Kingdom
- Post town: MAGHERA
- Postcode district: BT46
- Dialling code: 028
- Police: Northern Ireland
- Fire: Northern Ireland
- Ambulance: Northern Ireland

Upperlands (from Irish Áth an Phoirt Leathain, meaning 'ford of the broad (river) bank') is a small village in County Londonderry, Northern Ireland. It is situated 3 miles north east of Maghera. It lies within the civil parish of Maghera, the historic barony of Loughinsholin, and is situated within Mid-Ulster District. In the 2011 Census it had a population of 561 people.

== History ==
=== Name ===
Upperlands takes its name from the townland of the same name (a townland of 568 acres) in which part of it lies (the rest lies in the townland of Tirgarvil (a townland of 435 acres). The townland of Upperland gets its name from the garbled pronunciation of the Irish Áth an Phoirt Leathain. This has historically been anglicised as Aghfortlany, Aportlaughan, Apportlane, Amfordlan, Ampurtain and Ampertaine.

=== Early history ===
Upperlands owes its existence to the linen industry and the Clark family who established the first linen mill there in 1736. Subsequent development of the industry led to the construction of substantial residences and small groups of workers homes, and shaped the form and character of Upperlands. Boyne Row (a group of listed buildings), in its riverside setting, represents workers housing, built by the mill-owners. There are four-man-made lakes or "dams" in Upperlands. These used to serve the linen mills. They are Craig's dam, Island dam, Green dam and Lapping-room dam. There is a scenic walk around the dams and they are kept stocked with fish for the benefit of anglers.

Ampertain (or Ampertaine) House is a plain late-Georgian type two-storey house built by Alexander Clark (1785–1871) in Upperlands around 1835. The front was elongated by a two-storey wing of similar style added in 1915. It also features a Victorian conservatory. It is a Grade B1 listed building which adjoins the main mill building complex of Clark's Mill.

=== Modern history ===
On 12 July 1921, despite a truce having recently been called in the ongoing war, members of the Upperlands Orange Lodge were fired on while returning from the Twelfth celebrations. They retrieved rifles and 'opened up in return', though no casualties were inflicted. Loyalists killed livestock belonging to nationalists in reprisal.

On 14 January 1957, during the IRA Border campaign, an explosion occurred at a B-Specials hut in Upperlands. The bomb had been placed against the corrugated iron wall of the hut, while several men were conversing around a stove inside. According to Wallace Clark, casualties were narrowly averted when one of the men heard the retreating footsteps of the IRA volunteer who had planted the device. He then evacuated himself and his colleagues before it exploded.

== Rivers ==
The Knockoneil River leased by the Clady And District Angling Club flows through the woodland and Clarks Dams and then onwards through the town. Water is drawn from the river south of Amportane Bridge into 4 manmade mill lakes known as clarkes or upperlands dams and flows out through a 6-foot brick pipe tunnel back into the river. The river in the town itself is easy access for anglers just below the town bridge Upperlands Bridge and fishable mainly upstream through Clarks Dams and on up to Amportane Bridge beside Lagans Scutch Mill and onwards upstream to Swatragh. Access downstream is more difficult as the river flows through mainly private properties. Anglers can access the river at the Boyne bridge on the southeast end of the town there is also an abandoned single-span railway bridge hidden.

The Knockoneil Flows on and merges with the Grillagh to form the Clady River.

The Grillagh River located a mile outside the town flowing under the Beresford Bridge on the Culnady Road Starting up in Carntogher Mountain and joining the Clady.

There is also the Upperlands Dams which are manmade loughs built over the centuries. Water from the Knockoneil is diverted through various sluice gates biggest ones being located downstream from Amportane Bridge on the Hillside Road and once a millrace which flowed from Barney Lagans Flax Scutch Mill over the river via an aqueduct into the dams. The Lakes are known as Craigs Dam, Green Dam, Lapping Dam, Island Dam. in the 1998 water was diverted from the Lapping Room Lake into a turbine for electricity which flows back into the source being the Knockoneil River. The Dams are lively with stocked and wild Brown Trout and Eels. They were built for William Clark And Sons originally but now are mainly used as a nature reserve and a fishery.

== Amenities ==
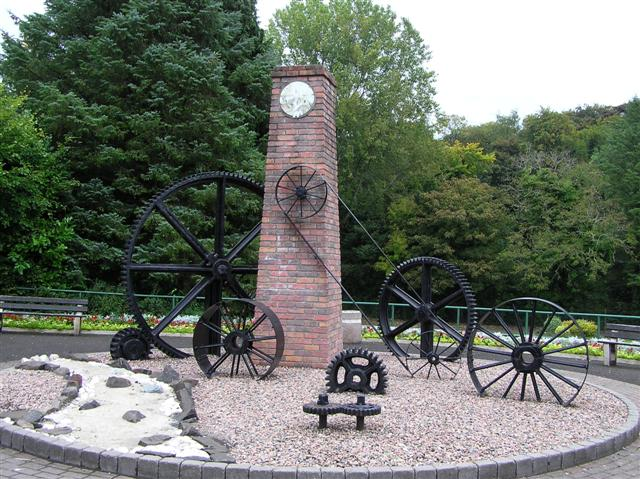
Upperlands monument to the linen industry

The village has a branch of the Royal British Legion.

There is also a business and community centre, which was built as part of economic regeneration efforts during the 1990s. It was officially opened in September 2000 by John Reid, who was then serving as Secretary of State for Northern Ireland. Revenue from the Upperlands Hydro Electric Plant, completed in 1998, subsidises the community centre.

== Education ==
Ampertaine Primary School is the local controlled primary school and educates around 120 pupils. The school was most recently inspected by the Education and Training Inspectorate in November 2016.

== Transport ==
The Northern Counties Committee's Derry Central Railway served Upperlands. Upperlands railway station opened on 18 December 1880, closed for passenger traffic on 28 August 1950 and finally closed on 1 October 1959 when the Ulster Transport Authority closed the Derry Central. The railway also had a spur to the linen mill.

Ulsterbus operates the 116 and 116b between Coleraine and Maghera.

== Demography ==
=== 2001 Census ===
Upperlands is classified as a small village or hamlet by the Northern Ireland Statistics and Research Agency (NISRA) (i.e. with population between 500 and 1,000 people). On Census day (29 April 2001) there were 535 people living in Upperlands. Of these:

- 21.5% were aged under 16 years and 21.2% were aged 60 and over
- 51.2% of the population were male and 48.8% were female
- 4.9% were from a Catholic background and 94.4% were from a Protestant background
- 4.2% of people aged 16–74 were unemployed

=== 2011 Census ===
The 2011 census recorded a population of 561 people. Of these:

- 9.5% were from a Catholic background and 85.4% were from a Protestant background

== Sport ==
Upperlands Football Club was founded in 1910 and play in the Premier Division of the Coleraine & District League. The club also has a junior team, Upperland Aces.

== Notable people ==
- Wallace Clark (1926 – 2011) – yachtsman and businessman known for Sailing round Ireland (1976).
- Wendy Houvenaghel (b. 1974) – former cyclist who specialised in track cycling. She won a silver medal in the women's individual pursuit at the 2008 Olympic Games in Beijing.
- Dean Shiels (b. 1985) – former professional footballer who now manages Coleraine F.C. He represented Scottish Premier League teams Kilmarnock F.C., Hibernian, Rangers F.C., as well as the Northern Ireland national team.
- Kenny Shiels (b. 1956) – football manager who coached the Northern Ireland women's team.

== See also ==
- List of towns and villages in Northern Ireland
