= St Mary's College, Clady =

Secondary school in Northern Ireland

St. Mary's College Clady
- Clady, County Londonderry, Northern Ireland

Information
- Type: Catholic School
- Established: 1963

St. Mary's College was a small rural secondary school in Clady, County Londonderry, Northern Ireland. In 2018, the school was amalgamated with St Paul's College Kilrea to form St Conor's College with a junior school at the Kilrea site.
