= Miles Clark =

Irish sailor and writer (1960–1993)

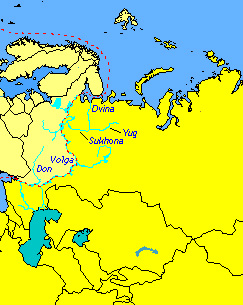
The route of Miles Clark circumnavigation of Europe journey through Russian waterways.

Miles Clark (3 November 1960 – 17 April 1993) was a sailor, journalist and writer from Northern Ireland. A few months before he died, Clark circumnavigated Europe through several of Russia's waterways which led him to winning the Cruising World Medal for Outstanding Seamanship.

== Early life ==
Born Magherafelt, County Londonderry, Northern Ireland on 3 November 1960, he was the son of Wallace Clark and the godson of Miles Smeeton, themselves both yachtsmen and authors. His brother Bruce became a foreign correspondent at The Times.

Clark was educated at Shrewsbury and Downing College, Cambridge, later going up to Sandhurst. At Cambridge, he studied Geography and organised an expedition to climb volcanoes and undertake scientific research in Atka, a remote island in the Aleutian archipelago. As a soldier in 1984, he was one of the oarsmen who rowed Tim Severin's replica Greek galley through the Black Sea to Georgia in the U.S.S.R.

== Writing ==
He left the army to become a full-time freelance travel writer and photographer in his mid-20s. As well, he was Features Editor of Yachting Monthly and wrote articles for other magazines. His biography of Miles and Beryl Smeeton, High Endeavours was published in 1991. He also wrote a short book entitled "Skydiving in Eight Days" and was illustrator of his father Wallace Clark's book "Lord of the Isles Voyage: Western Ireland to the Scottish Hebrides in a 16th Century Galley" in 1993.

== Circumnavigation of Europe ==
After the collapse of the Soviet Union, Clark saw the opportunity for travelling through Russian internal waters.

With grudging permission from the KGB and sponsorship from National Geographic he departed from Northern Ireland in the summer of 1992 sailing the family's 60-year-old wooden yacht Wild Goose into the Arctic Circle.

Setting out on the 3,200-kilometre route, first circling Norway and entering the White Sea, he then travelled to the Black Sea crossing the White Sea – Baltic Canal until the Onega Lake, then proceeding through the Volga-Baltic waterway to the Rybinsk Reservoir and the Volga River. He then successively followed the Volga–Don Canal and the Don River to the Sea of Azov and the Black Sea, returning to Northern Ireland.

Wild Goose, a 36 ft yawl built in 1935, was the first non-Russian boat to make that journey.

== Personal life ==
He married Sarah Hill in 1987; the couple had a son, Finn, born in 1990. Finn became an illustrator and his work included a watercolour of Wild Goose sailing away, for the title cover for The Call of the Running Tide by his grandfather Wallace Clark. Finn died in December 2015.

== Sudden death ==
Miles Clark died unexpectedly a few months after his return home from his Russia expedition, in Salisbury on 17 April 1993 aged 32, from the possible effects of toxins absorbed during the trip. He was writing a book about the trip when he died. The book, Sailing Round Russia was completed by his father, based on the ship's logs.
