= Wallace Clark =

Northern Irish businessman

Henry Wallace Stuart Clark MBE (20 November 1926 – 8 May 2011) was a sailor, author and businessman from Northern Ireland.

Clark was educated at Shrewsbury School and served in the Royal Navy Volunteer Reserve in World War II. He was an officer in the Ulster Special Constabulary and upon its dissolution became a major in the Ulster Defence Regiment serving until 1981. He was the elder brother of Henry Clark, MP for North Antrim from 1959 to 1970. He was appointed High Sheriff of County Londonderry for 1969.

He is best known for his writing and his sailing exploits. He began sailing at an early age, and from the late 1940s began to explore the waters near his family's ancestral home in Upperlands, County Londonderry. Basing himself in Portrush, County Antrim, he sailed along the north coast of Ireland, and in particular visited Rathlin Island, County Antrim and Inishowen, County Donegal, Republic of Ireland.

His cruises became more adventurous with experience, and his 1954 voyage round Ireland became the basis for his best-known book, Sailing Round Ireland, first published in 1976. In 1963, he was a leading light in the recreation of St Columba's voyage from Derry to Iona in a currach. Nearly thirty years later he was heavily involved in another major reconstruction journey, the Lord of the Isles Voyage, from Ireland to Scotland in Aileach, a wooden galley of the kind used in those waters in medieval times.

Other early voyages in his long sailing career included a cruise to Norway in 1953, and frequent trips to Brittany as well as a longer voyage to the Mediterranean in 1961 through the French canal system.

One of the most challenging projects he was involved in was a circumnavigation of Europe. The journey in Wild Goose by his son Miles, travelled around North Cape, Norway, and then through Russian waterways to the Black Sea, and on through the Mediterranean back to Northern Ireland. Wallace helped plan the voyage and sailed on the first and last legs of the journey. Miles died before the completion of the account of the voyage, and Wallace compiled the book Sailing Round Russia from Miles's logs.

He continued sailing late into life, and completed another reconstruction journey in 2009 when he recreated the 1814 journey of his ancestor Robert Harvey to the Western Isles. Having sold his last boat Agivey in 2009, Wallace was to complete one last cruise in the summer of 2010 along the Croatian coast with old friends. He died on 8 May 2011 and his wife June died in 2024, and is survived by his son, the journalist Bruce. His last book, The Call of the Running Tide, an all-new work edited by Bruce Clark and Tara Mackie, looking back on his long sailing career, was launched on Rathlin Island on 7 July 2012.

== Works ==
- The Call of the Running Tide (2012)
- Sailing Round Russia: Miles Clark's Epic Voyage from Ireland to the White Sea and Across a Continent to the Black Sea and Mediterranean (1999)
- Sailing Round Ireland (1976)
- Rathlin. Its Island Story (1971 as Rathlin – Disputed Island)
- Linen on the Green. An Irish Mill Village, 1730 – 1982
- Growing Up in Upperlands: The Story of an Irish Mill Village
- Guns in Ulster
- Brave Men and True: Early Days in the Ulster Defence Regiment – Pages of a Company Commander's Diary
