= Swatragh =

Village in County Londonderry, Northern Ireland

Coordinates: 54.9075°N 06.66722°W

Swatragh: Irish: an Suaitreach
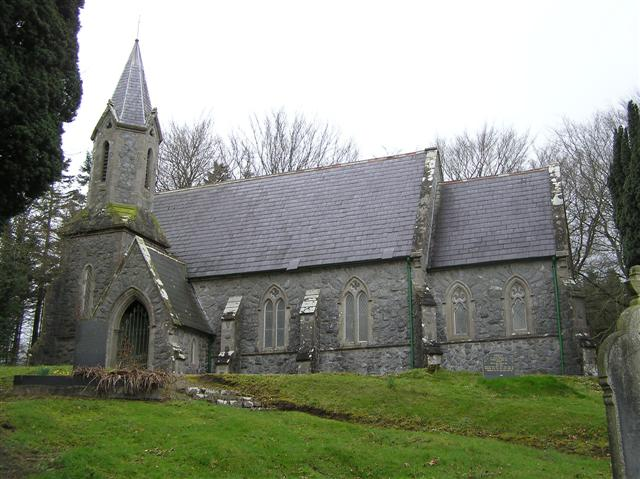
- Swatragh Church of Ireland

- Location within Northern Ireland
- Population: 372 (2021 census)
  - Belfast: 43 mi (69 km)
- District: Mid Ulster
- County: County Londonderry
- Country: Northern Ireland
- Sovereign state: United Kingdom
- Post town: MAGHERA
- Postcode district: BT46
- Dialling code: 028
- UK Parliament: Mid Ulster
- NI Assembly: Mid Ulster

Swatragh (from Irish an Suaitreach, meaning 'billeted soldier') is a village and townland in County Londonderry, Northern Ireland. Swatragh is on the main A29 road north of Maghera, and is situated within Mid-Ulster District. The population was 372 in the 2021 census. The village has three churches: one Roman Catholic, one Church of Ireland, and one Presbyterian. The Catholic and Church of Ireland churches are listed buildings. St John's is the local primary school.

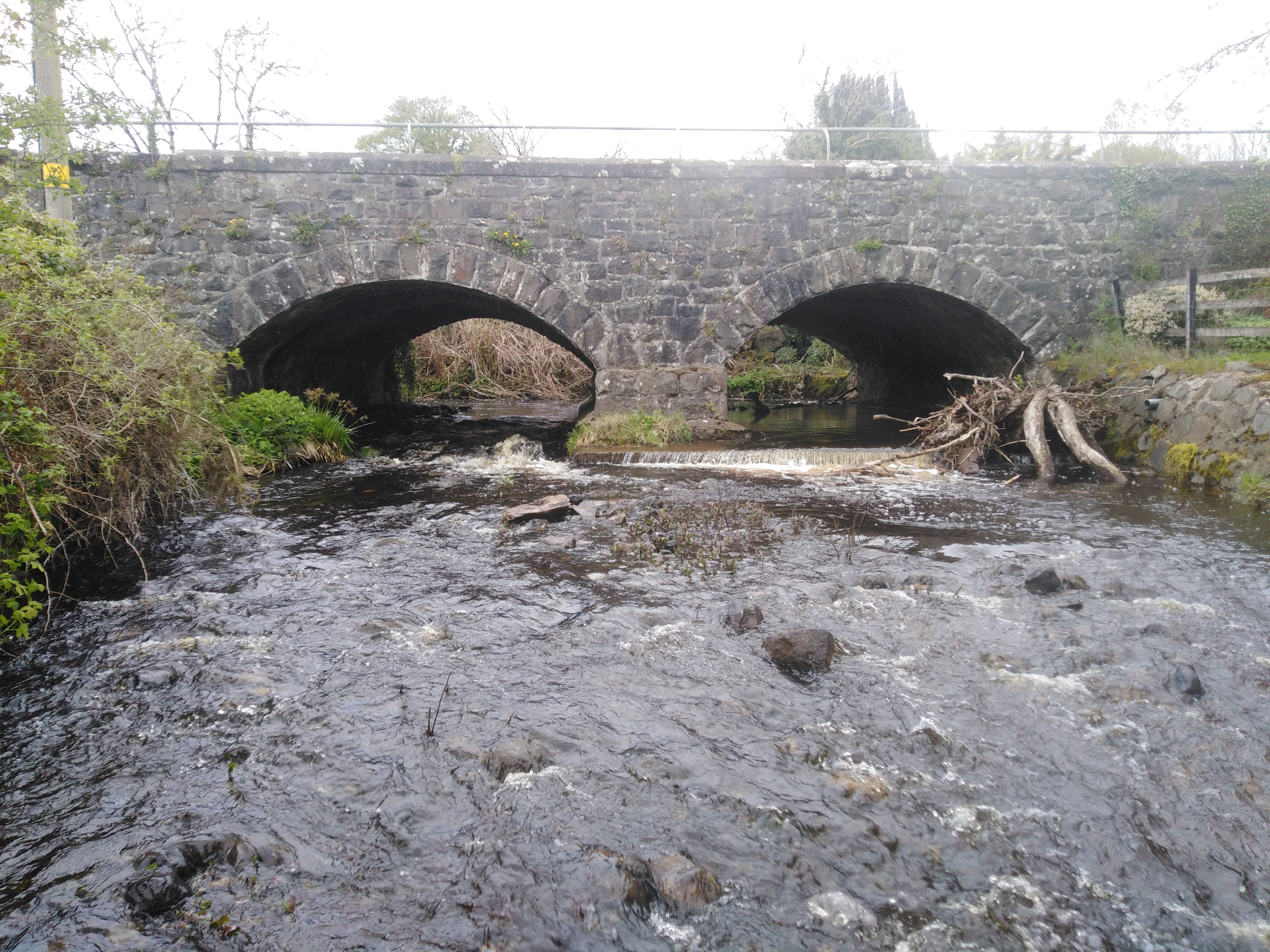
Swatragh Bridge Over The Knockoneil River tributary to the Clady

Swatragh's name in Irish, an Suaitreach, is derived from a shortened form of Baile an tSuaitrigh meaning "townland of the billeted soldier".

== History ==
On June 5th, 1921, during the Irish war of independence, a Royal Irish Constabulary patrol was ambushed by the Irish Republican Army. One Sergeant was killed and another was wounded. In retaliation, a member of Sinn Féin was shot and killed outside the village that evening.

On September 17th, 1991, the Provisional Irish Republican Army launched a mortar attack against a British security vehicle passing through the village. One Police Officer was killed and three soldiers were wounded.

== Tamnyrankin and Knockoneill Court Tombs ==
Just north of Swatragh is the neolithic era single Court cairn Tamnyrankin. Excavations in the 1940s showed a range of pottery, hollow scrapers and a leaf shaped arrowhead. Nearby is another single court cairn (Knockoneill). This site is 24 feet across with a gallery of 14 feet by 7 feet. Items found at this site include: ornamental bowls/pots and cremated remains.

== Sport ==
Swatragh is home to Michael Davitt Gaelic Athletic Club. Several of the club's Gaelic football players have represented Derry GAA.

There is also a boxing club located within the village.

== Notable people ==
- Brian Keenan – IRA leader
- Jude McAtamney – NFL kicker
- Terry McFlynn – professional association football player
- Anthony Tohill – Gaelic footballer
- Ruairí Convery – Gaelic Footballer and Hurler for Derry County.

== Rivers ==
The Knockoneil River flows through the village and is leased by the Clady And District Angling Club. The rivers best access is mainly downstream from the Swatragh Bridge downstream towards Beagh Bridge. The river can also be easy fished so far upstream about a fields length before becoming wild and overgrown Brown trout is plentiful along this stretch of the river as well as late Salmon and Bann Trout. The Knockoneil is an artery of the Clady River along with the Grillagh River.
