= Akafuku =

Japanese pastry shop

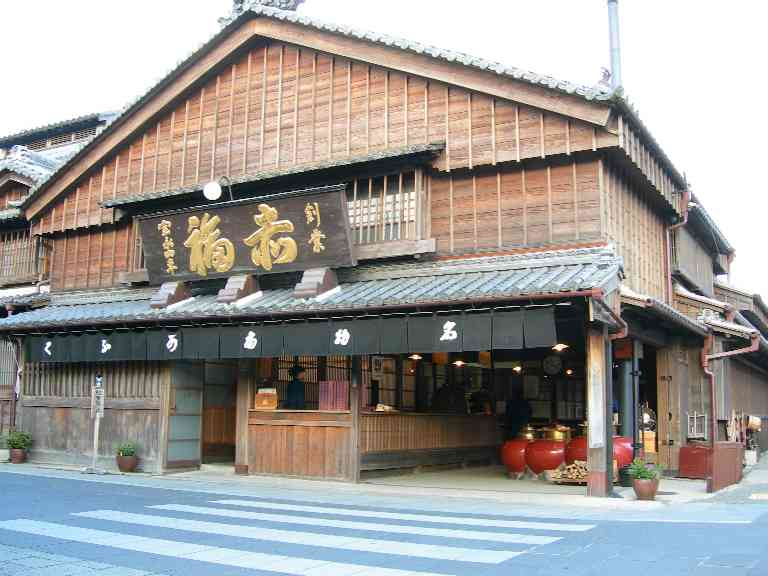
- Type: Kabushiki gaisha
- Industry: pastries
- Founded: 1707; 319 years ago
- Headquarters: Ise, Mie
- Website: akafuku.co.jp

Akafuku (赤福) is a Japanese pastry shop founded in 1707, during the Edo period. Still active and family-owned, its longevity allows it to be part of the Henokiens.

Akafuku first developed as a teahouse for pilgrims going to Ise Grand Shrine. It is the place of origin for akafuku mochi, a type of rice cakes filled with sweet bean paste. It closed twice in its 300+ year history: during World War II when sugar became scarce, and in 2007 after authorities found that the company had tampered with expiration labels. Masutane Hamada, the 11th head of the business resigned after the scandal, but returned to the position in 2017. He resigned again in 2020 after it was found that he had allowed the company to supply "anti-social groups" (a euphemism for the Yakuza, or Japanese mafia) with alcohol bearing their logos between 2000 and 2012.

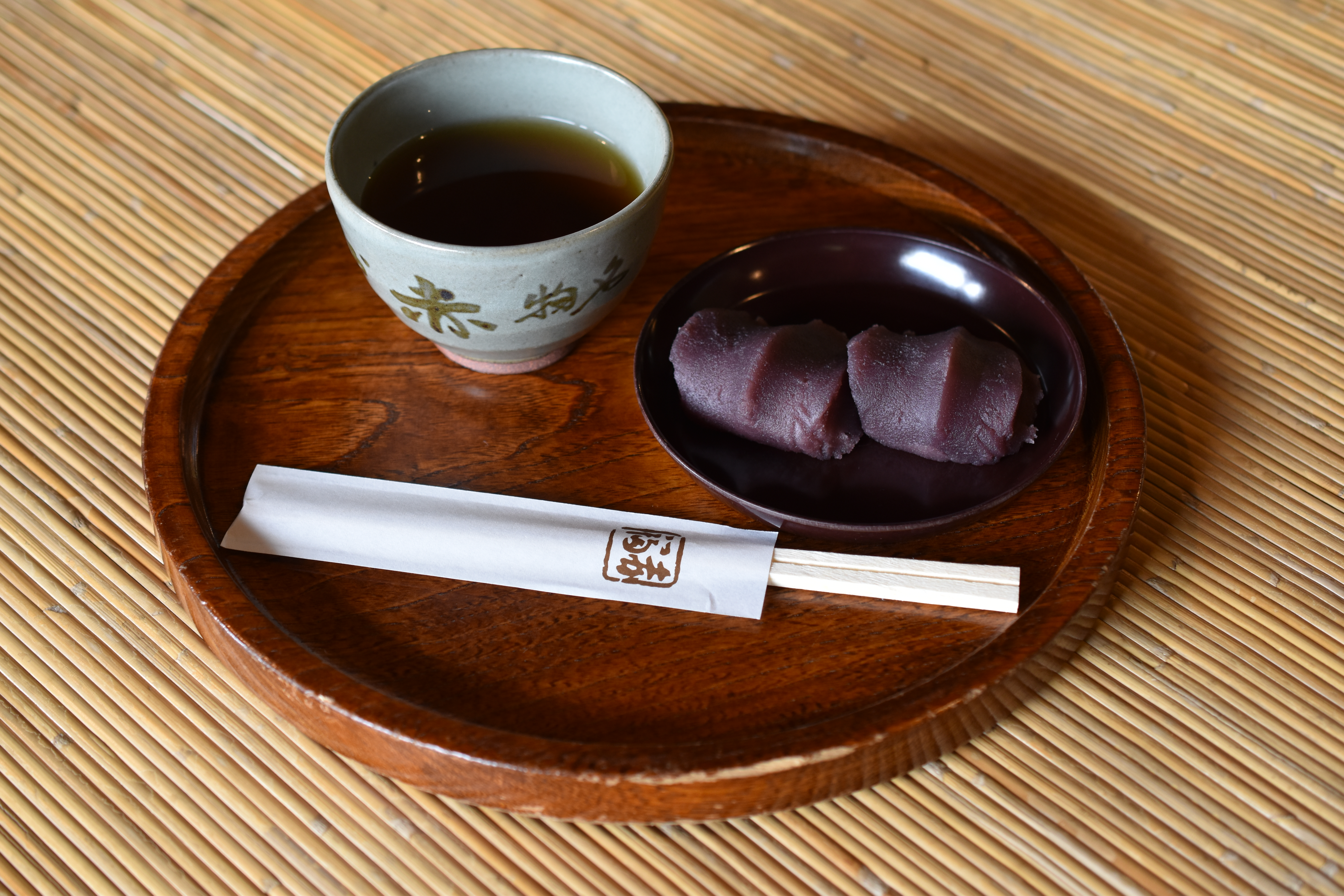
The famous Akafuku mochi.

In the 1990s the company invested more than US$120 million to develop the Okage Yokocho district of period stores which became a popular destination, driving the number of annual visitors from 200,000 to 3.4 million.
