= William Clark & Sons =

Irish textile company

- Industry: Textile
- Founded: 1736
- Headquarters: 72 Upperlands, Maghera, County Londonderry, Northern Ireland
- Number of employees: 35 (2017)
- Website: www.wmclark.co.uk

William Clark & Sons is the oldest linen mill in Northern Ireland and the textile company founded in Maghera, County Londonderry in 1736.

The main product is a fine linen canvas for the tailoring industry, used is a unique process of beetling - pounding of the fabric to flatten it.

In February 2017 a fire destroyed one of the factory buildings, but the production was intact.

The Mills power source was from the Knockoneil River which is an artery of the Clady River.

== See also ==
- Henokiens
