= Viellard-Migeon et Cie =

French steel manufacturer

- Native name: Viellard Migeon & Compagnie
- Industry: Fishing equipment
- Founded: 1796; 230 years ago
- Headquarters: 6 Route des Forges, 90120 Morvillars, France
- Website: www.viellardmigeon.com/en

Viellard Migeon & Compagnie is a French manufacturer of the steel products, especially for fishermen. The company history dates back to 1796, it is owned and managed by the Viellard family for more than 200 years. Due to its longevity it is a part the Henokiens association.

== History ==
In 1796, Jean-Nicolas Viellard and his son created a metalworks workshop. Jean-Nicolas' grandson, Juvénal Viellard (1803-1886), married Laure Migeon (1813-1900) in 1835 and became a partner in her father's business. In 1874, Juvénal et Laure took full control over the Migeon family business.

The company is well known for its angling equipment.

== See also ==
- Henokiens
