= Van Eeghen Group =

Dutch food business founded in 1662

- Native name: Van Eeghen Functional Ingredients B.V.
- Industry: Food industry
- Founded: 1662
- Headquarters: Herengracht 462, 1017 CA, Amsterdam, Netherlands
- Website: vaneeghen.com/en

Van Eeghen Group is one of the oldest still functioning food producing companies in Amsterdam, Netherlands, founded in 1662. It is a family business and a member of the Henokiens association. The trading company Van Eeghen is also active under other names such as Van Eeghen International and Belegging- en Handelmaatschappij Van Eeghen.

Jacob van Eeghen was previously a merchant in Aardenburg, in States of Flanders. Via Middelburg and Haarlem, the Protestant Van Eeghen family ends up in Amsterdam. Like his father and grandfather, he traded in wool and linen. Later also in products such as grain, herring and salt. Since 1969, the banking activities have been transferred to H. Oyens & Zonen under the name Oyens & Van Eeghen, now Bank Oyens & Van Eeghen. In 2014, he surrendered his banking license and continued as an investment firm.

The part of the group is the Van Eeghen Functional Ingredients company producing various vitamins, antioxidants, amino acids, nutritional supplements, natural botanical extracts etc.

== See also ==
- Henokiens
