= Möller Group =

German automotive company

- Native name: MÖLLERGROUP GmbH & Co.KG
- Industry: Automotive industry
- Founded: 1730; 296 years ago
- Headquarters: Kupferhammer, 33649 Bielefeld, Germany
- Website: www.moellergroup.com

Möller Group is one of the oldest German companies founded in 1730, and located in Bielefeld, North Rhine-Westphalia.

Since the foundation it is a family business and became a Henokiens association member.

== See also ==
- Henokiens
