= Okaya & Co. =

Japanese company

Okaya & Co., Ltd.
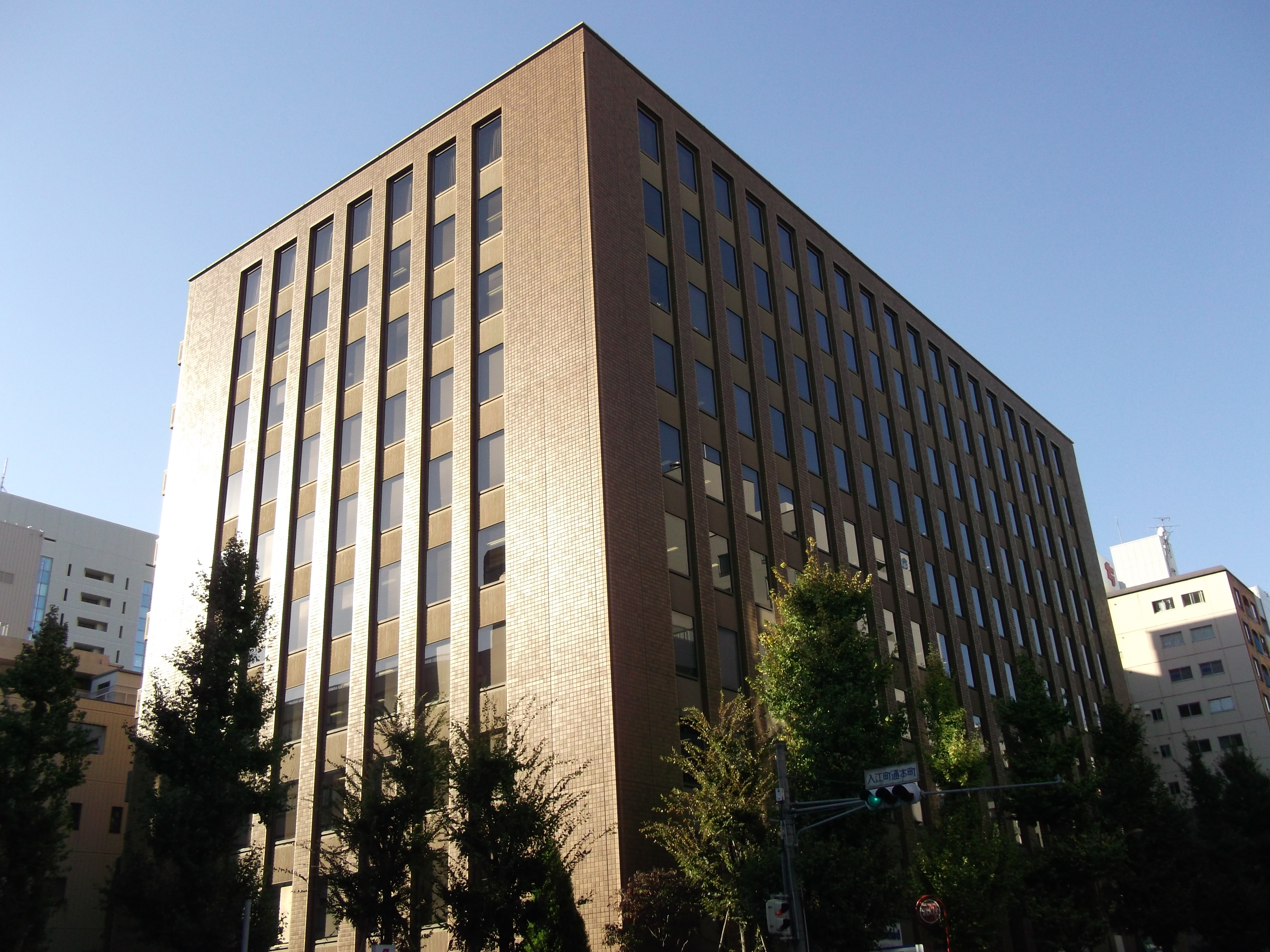
- Native name: 岡谷鋼機
- Formerly: Okaya Shoten & Co., Ltd. (1937–1943)
- Industry: International trade
- Founded: 1669; 357 years ago as Sasaya; 1937; 89 years ago as Okaya Shoten & Co., Ltd.
- Headquarters: 2-4-18, Sakae, Naka-ku, Nagoya, Aichi Prefecture, Japan
- Key people: Tokuichi Okaya (President)
- Website: www.okaya.co.jp

Okaya & Co., Ltd. (岡谷鋼機) is one of the oldest still functioning Japanese trade concerns. It was founded in Nagoya city in 1669 under the name Sasaya (笹屋) and later established as Okaya in 1937. It is a family business more than 200 years and became the Henokiens association member.

It is the 48th on the list of World’s Oldest Family Companies.

== See also ==
- Henokiens
