= Knockoneil River =

River in Northern Ireland

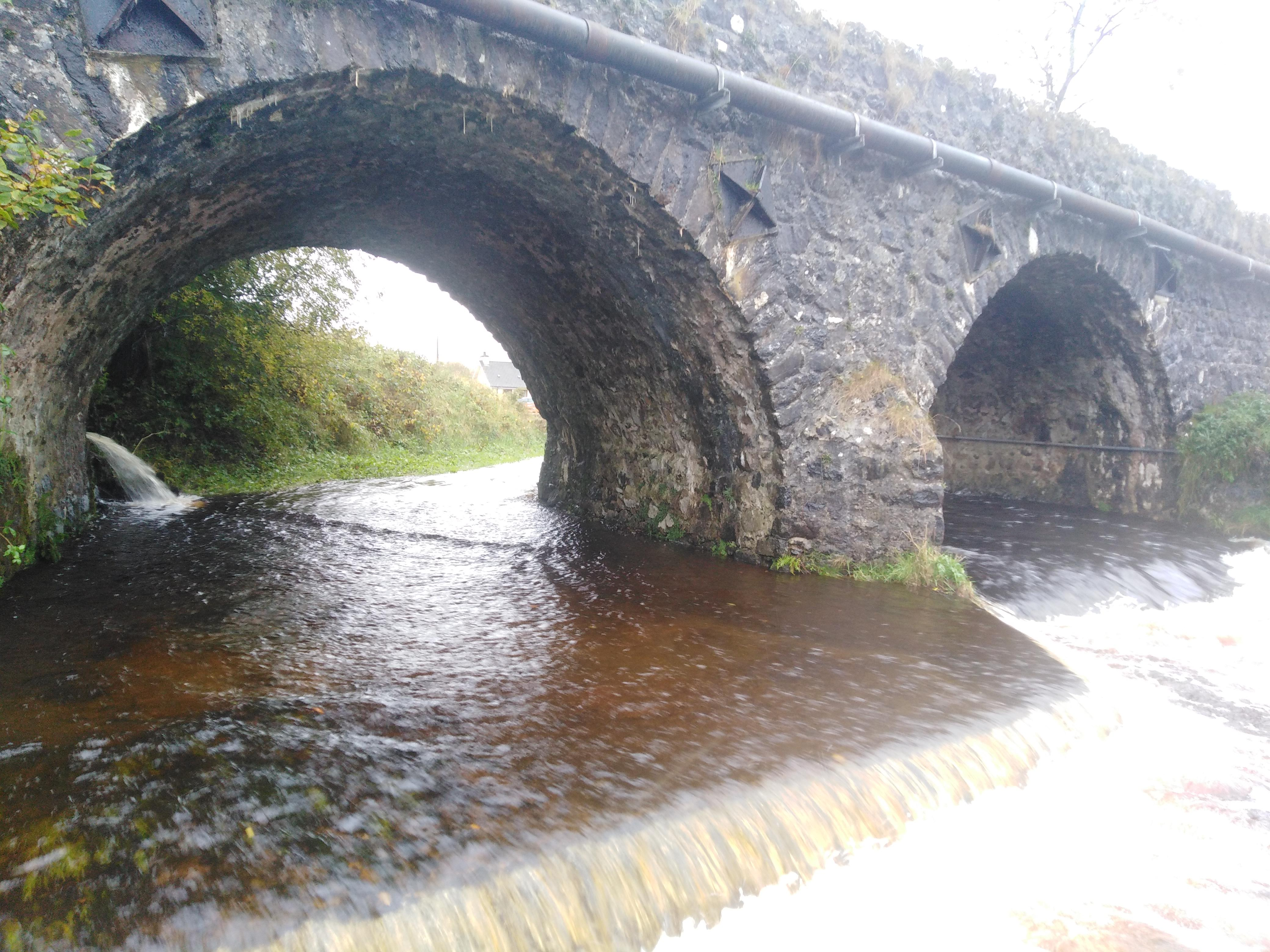
- Knockoneil Bridge or Corlacky Bridge

Location
- Country: Northern Ireland

Physical characteristics
- Source
  - location: Sperrin Mountains
- Mouth: Clady River
  - location: Upperlands, County Londonderry
  - coordinates: 54°52′17″N 6°35′51″W

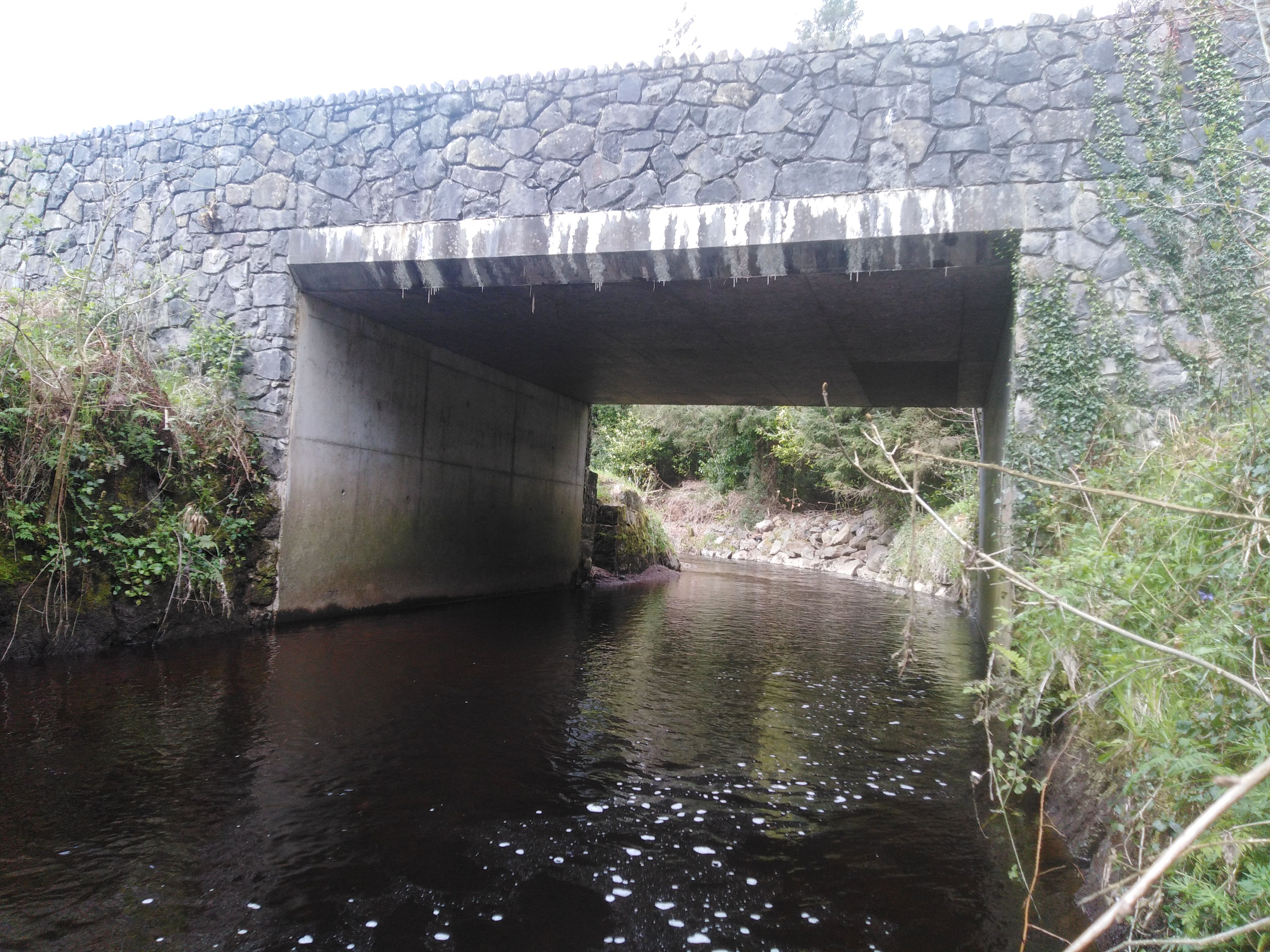
Amportane Bridge Over The Knockoneil

The Knockoneil River (meaning 'Nialls Hill River'; sometimes spelled Knockoneill), is a small to medium-sized river in Northern Ireland, located near Maghera. It is the longest river on the Clady River system, It starts on Carntogher Mountain then flows eastwards towards Swatragh. Knockoneil is a townland in the rural area of Slaughtneil and is the townland the rivers named after. The Knockoneil starts its course and its a similar width to the Grillagh River. The river widens as it passes through Swatragh and onwards to Upperlands where a lot of hydro energy from the river is used for the former Clarke's mill onwards down to Upperlands. The river flows quite swiftly through the village of Upperlands passing under the Upperlands Town Bridge, the Railway Bridge and the Boyne Bridge as well as the former Old Mills. From Upperlands it quiets down through the countryside outside Upperlands and on to Culnady where it flows under the Dunglady Bridge, an old bridge near Culnady named after Dunglady Fort (from 'fort above the Clady'). Shortly downstream it merges outside Culnady with the Grillagh River to form what is then known as the Clady River. The river also has its 3 local alternative names: the upper part of the river from its source to near Swatragh is known as the Corlacky River; the mid to lower from just above Swatragh right down to its near mouth outside Culnady is the Beagh River; the last mile of the river, particularly after the Ampertaine Burn joins, is the Dunglady River, though this name is less common than the other two.

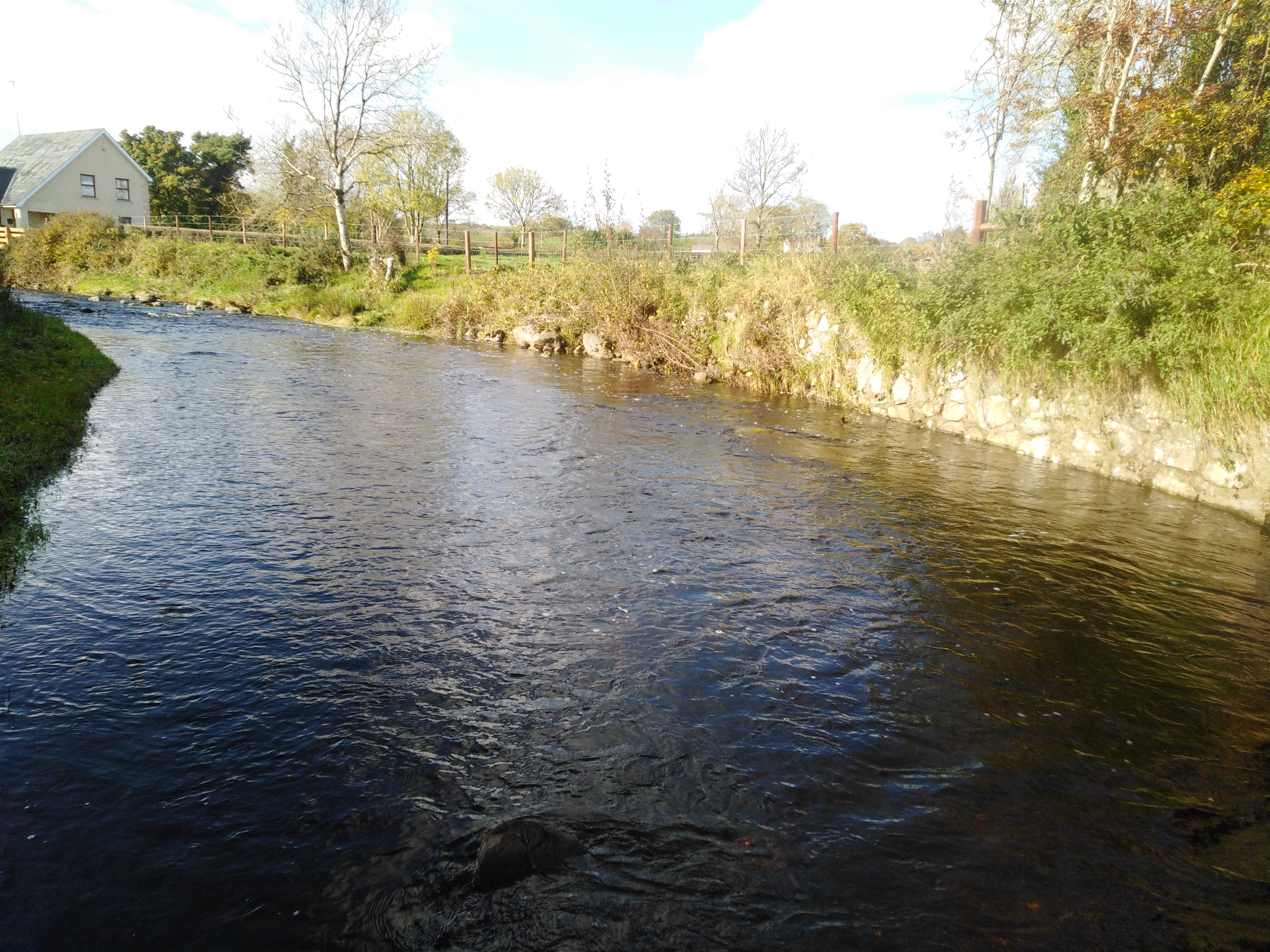
Knockoneil at the foot of the Knockoneil Bridge in Slaughtneil

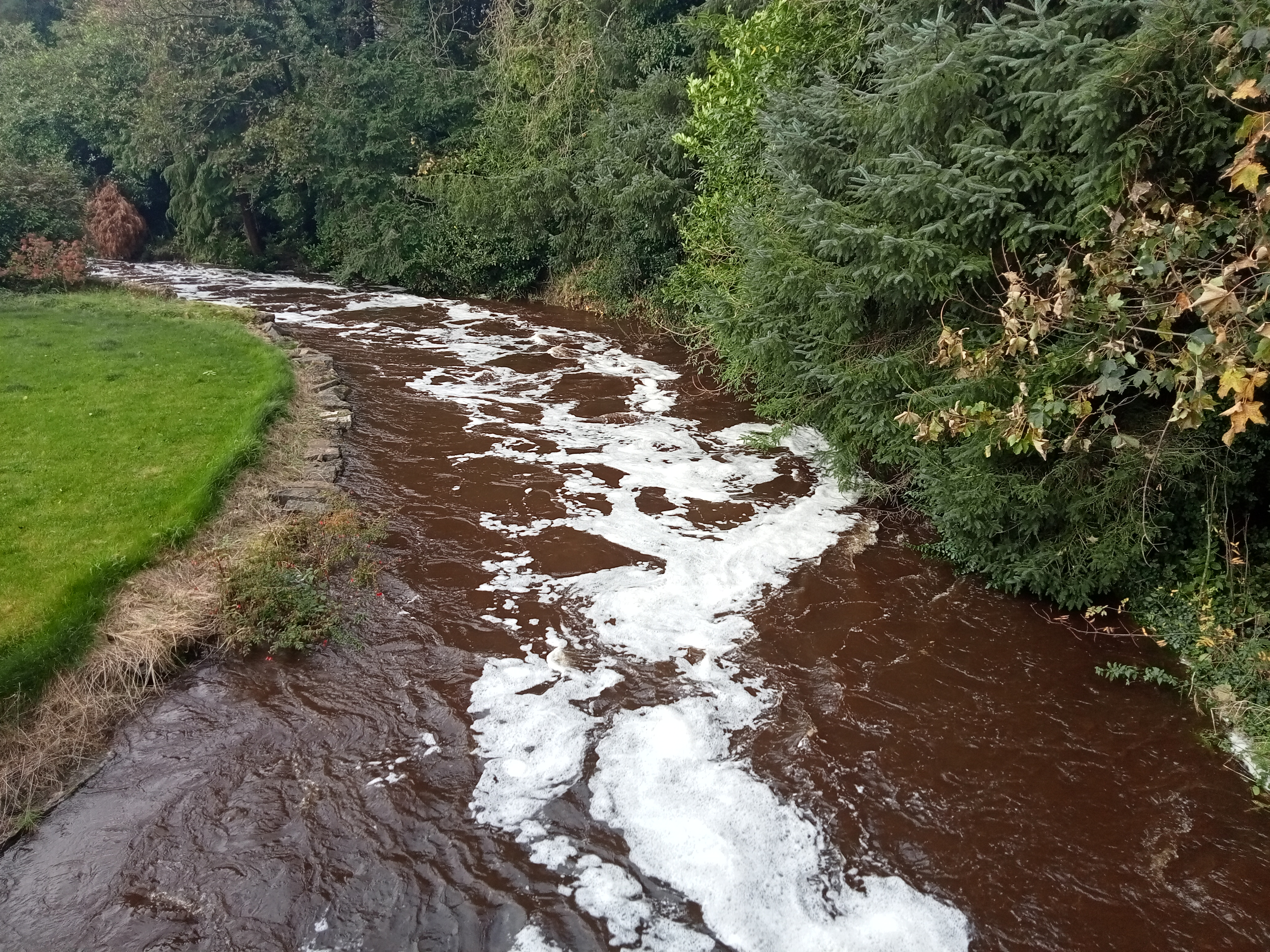
Knockoneil In Flood Oct 2022

The river is a key reason William Clark & Sons in Upperlands exists, being the main power source for the mill. The river until recently was diverted through large sluice gates at the weir downstream from the Amportane Bridge, also known as Lagans Bridge, this tailrace formally feed five man-made lakes known locally as "The Dams". Nowadays the Dams are fed from local sheughs. The river was used to power Lagans Scutch Mill and the sawmill just beside the bridge, as well and all its electronics. The dyeing process at Upperlands Mill caused dye pollution on the river which affected the main Clady River. The river was similar to the Grillagh in that many flax mills were built along the river with Lagans Scutching Mill on the Hillside Road in between Swatragh and Upperlands being the most well known.

The River is leased by the Clady And District Angling Club, founded in 1962.

== Bridges ==
Tammybrack Bridge, Corlacky Hill Bridge, Knockoneil Bridge / Upper River.

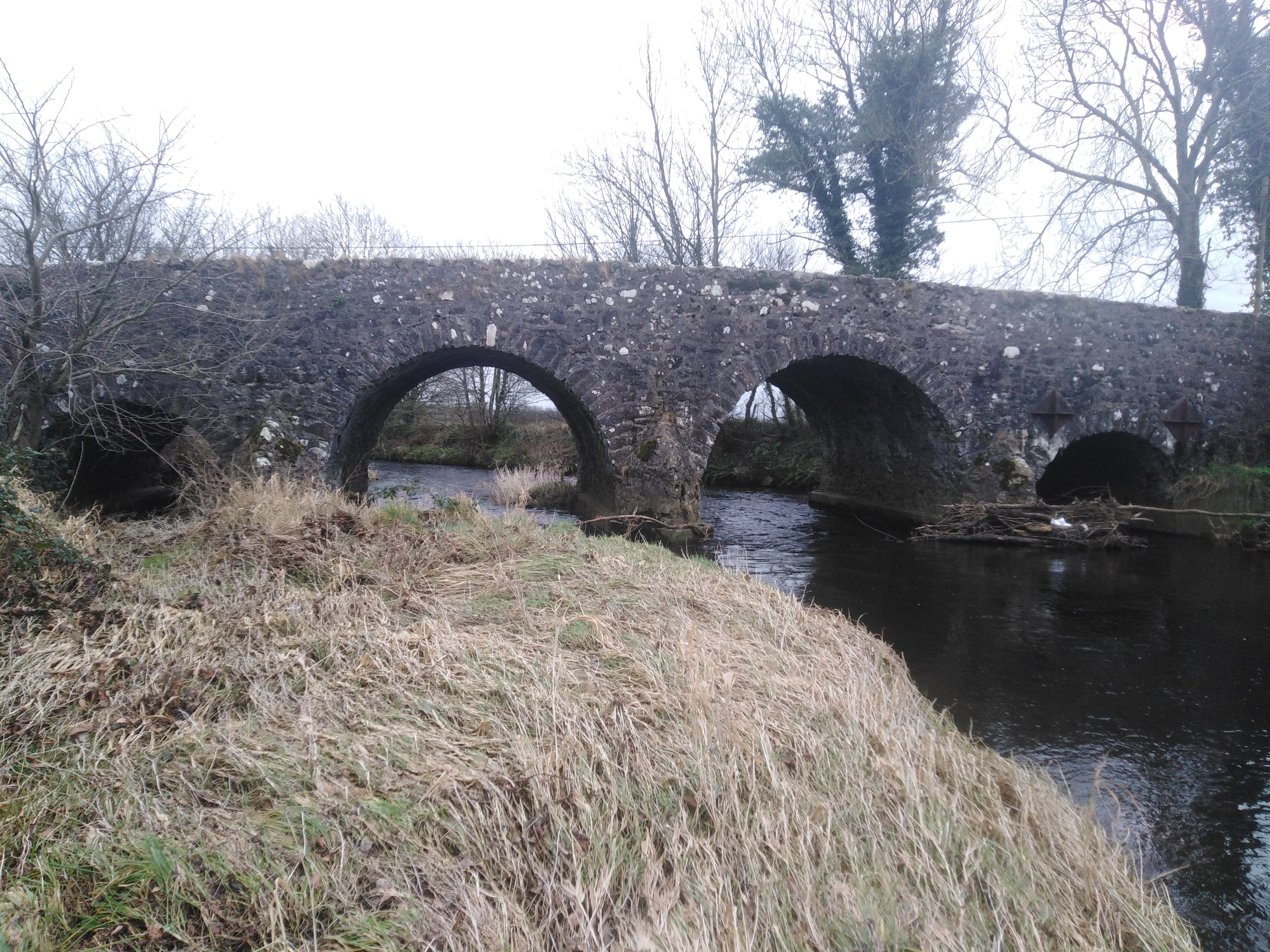
Dunglady Bridge.

Swatragh Bridge, Beagh Bridge, Amportane Bridge / Middle River.

Upperlands Bridge, Boyne Bridge, Dunglady Bridge / Lower River.

== Tributaries ==
Green Water Burn Starts south of Brockaghboy windfarm, flowing a few miles before joining the Knockoneil. Corlacky Burn starts on Corlacky Hill and also flows into the Knockoneil. Craigavole Burn is the third largest tributary of the Knockoneil, it starts in Craigavole townland and flows east of Swatragh underneath the GAC Swatragh football pitch and rounds a circle east of the town and then straight south and flows into the Knockoneil north of Beagh Bridge.
