= J. D. Neuhaus =

J. D. Neuhaus is a company based in Witten, Germany, that manufactures air-powered hoists, winches and cranes. It is one of the oldest privately owned companies in Germany and has been operating from the same location for more than 280 years. With an export share of over 80%, J. D. Neuhaus is the global technology leader in the segment of pneumatic and hydraulic hoists. J. D. Neuhaus exports to 90 countries worldwide. The company has subsidiaries in the USA, Great Britain, France, Singapore, and Dubai. Its products are used in some 70 industries, including mining, oil and gas exploration (or processing), the chemical industry, and heavy plant construction.

== History ==
The company was founded in 1745 by Johann Diederich Neuhaus and is still a 7th generation family business. It initially manufactured wooden shaft winches for locks on the Ruhr. Later, they were also used for loading goods, hauling coal, and lifting railway carriages. As early as 1880, loads of up to 7500 kg could be moved in this way. Since 1952, J. D. Neuhaus has been manufacturing air-powered hoists, which were initially used mainly in mining because they were both particularly powerful and particularly safe. Since the mid-1990s, J. D. Neuhaus has been a member of the Association les Hénokiens.

Johann Diederich Conrad Neuhaus In 1745 Johann Diederich Conrad Neuhaus (1726-1809) was registered in the Sprockhövel factory book as a "Fabrickant". A "Fabrickant" was a master craftsman with his own business who supplied his products to the "Fabrick". It was an association of self-employed master smiths who sold the smithy products made by their members at home and abroad and took orders. Johann Diederich Conrad Neuhaus specialised in the construction of winches, which apparently sold well.

Heinrich Wilhelm Neuhaus In 1807 the Peace of Tilsit was concluded and Westphalia became a kingdom by Napoleon's grace. This was also the end of the "Sprockhövelsche Fabrick". Heinrich Wilhelm Neuhaus (1765-1831) survived the hard times with his forge by selling his products on his own. In 1831 he handed over a flourishing business to his son Johann Diederich II.

Johann Diederich Neuhaus II. In the middle of the 19th century, industry flourished. Sales of steel goods grew, the railway network was built, as were shipping lines spanning the globe. J. Diederich Neuhaus (1813-1883) built winches for the locks on the Ruhr, for horse-drawn vehicles, for lifting railway wagons, for aligning rails, loading goods and increasingly for work in the coal mines.

Louis Neuhaus Under Louis Neuhaus (1848-1905) the company was able to specialise more and more. The Neuhaus winch became an increasingly important tool in the rapidly growing mining industry. Although the Neuhaus company still did not go beyond the operation of an artisan forge with factory production of winches, Louis expanded the business with great success. He had the old forge demolished and a spacious new one built next to the residential house, where the first machines driven by muscle power were also used.

Emma Neuhaus Louis Neuhaus died at the age of 57 and his wife Emma Neuhaus (1859-1932) took over sole responsibility. She had to work with assistants and for particularly difficult jobs she called in master craftsman Wilhelm Müller, who did in the evening hours what the others could not manage during the day. In 1907, the two married. In 1922, Emma Neuhaus handed over the family estate to her youngest son Max Neuhaus.

Max Neuhaus Max Neuhaus (1900-1984) joined the company at the age of 19, received procuration and bore the entire responsibility. He specialised in the trade of winches and hoists and resumed production and repair after the First World War. In 1923, the first transmission-driven machine tools were purchased. In 1925, Max Neuhaus received an order for 300 track hoisting winches from the Reichsbahn Central Office in Berlin. After the Second World War, it was again the collieries that first asked for Neuhaus equipment. In order to meet the increasing demands, a long-planned workshop was built in 1952.

J. Diederich Neuhaus In 1952 J. Diederich Neuhaus (1925-2010) joined the company as a young engineer. He had the idea to replace the hand drive for JDN hoists, which had been common until then, with a compressed air motor. This was a most welcome innovation for underground mining, because the new J. Diederich Neuhaus air hoists made it possible to work much more effectively, economically and safely. In February 2000, J. Diederich Neuhaus was awarded the Cross of Merit on Ribbon of the Order of Merit of the Federal Republic of Germany by the Federal President. At the same time, he received the Silver Badge of Honour of the City of Witten.

Wilfried Neuhaus-Galladé Wilfried Neuhaus-Galladé (* 1957) joined the company in 1986. He had to adapt the family business to the changing conditions of global markets. Due to the rapid decline of the German mining industry, major restructuring took place. Wilfried Neuhaus-Galladé installed a worldwide distribution system and founded subsidiaries in the USA, France, England, Singapore and China. In this way he was able to increase the export share, which was still less than 5% in 1980, to over 80% today.
