= Cartiera Mantovana =

Italian paper manufacturer

- Industry: Paper
- Founded: 1615
- Headquarters: Via Principe Amedeo 17, 46100 Mantua, Italy
- Number of employees: 200 (2016)
- Website: www.cartieramantovana.it

Cartiera Mantovana is one of the oldest Italian paper manufacturers founded in 1615 and located in Mantua. Since the 17th century, it has been operated by the Marenghis, a noble family, and is now a member of the Henokiens association.

In 2015, the company celebrated their 400th anniversary with about 200 employees. Today, over 50% of its production is exported mainly to European countries.

== See also ==
- List of oldest companies
