= Miles and Beryl Smeeton =

Miles Smeeton (1906–1988) and Beryl Smeeton (1905–1979) were a British couple of travellers, pioneers, explorers, mountaineers, and cruising sailors. They were recipients of numerous sailing awards, farmers, and prolific authors. They were also wildlife conservationists and founders of the Cochrane Ecological Institute, a Canadian non-profit charity responsible for successfully reintroducing the swift fox to Canada.

== Biography ==
Brigadier Miles Richard Smeeton, DSO, MBE, MC was born in Yorkshire, England, in 1906, and was educated at Wellington and the Royal Military College, Sandhurst. He was commissioned into the Green Howards in 1925 but transferred to the Indian Army in 1936, joining Hodson's Horse. During the Second World War he served with the 3rd Indian Motor Brigade in the Western Desert and commanded Probyn's Horse in action against the Japanese in Burma in 1945. He was awarded the Military Cross for gallantry at Bir Hacheim on 27 May 1942 and the Distinguished Service Order for successful leadership during skirmishes at Shande and Ywadan on 3 and 5 March 1945, respectively. In early 1947 he retired from the Indian Army, having commanded the 63rd Brigade from May 1945 onwards.

Beryl, born in 1905, was raised in a family of British soldiers and travelled widely throughout the world, some of which is described in her book Winter Shoes in Springtime, written under the name Beryl Smeeton. Charles R. Boxer, the distinguished historian and soldier, was one of her brothers.

In 1938 Miles and Beryl married. In 1939, the two attempted to climb 25,263-foot Tirich Mir, in the Himalaya, with Tenzing Norgay. Although they failed, Beryl achieved renown as one of the first women to climb so high. After the war, the couple settled on a farm on Salt Spring Island, BC, with their daughter, Clio. Beryl had bought the farm during the war; anticipation of a happy life there when peace came helped sustain both Miles and Beryl during the years of separation while Miles served in North Africa and later the Far East, where he commanded a formation and received the local occupying Japanese surrender.

== High Endeavours ==
In 1991 Miles Clark, a godson of the Smeetons, wrote a comprehensive biography of Miles and Beryls' lives entitled High Endeavours: The Extraordinary Life and Adventures of Miles and Beryl Smeeton. Clark spent over 2 years researching the book and used extensive sources including tape recordings, interviews, diaries, letters, ship's logbooks and books including 11 written by the Smeetons.

== Sailing years ==
In 1951, the Smeetons bought the 46' bermudan ketch Tzu Hang on a visit to England. The boat had been designed by HS Rouse and built in Hong Kong in 1939. The name was believed to mean "under the protection of Guanyin", the Daoist goddess of the sea and protector of sailors. They returned on the boat to British Columbia, learning to sail on the way. In 1955 they sold the farm and sailed on Tzu Hang for Australia.

In December 1956 Miles and Beryl departed Melbourne on Tzu Hang to visit Clio at school in England, intending to follow the old clipper route. The journey would take them eastbound around Cape Horn, a voyage that at that time had very rarely been accomplished in small boats. They were accompanied on the boat by a young friend, the Englishman John Guzzwell, who had been circumnavigating the world in his self-made boat on a voyage later recounted in his book Trekka, as well as by their Siamese cat, Pwe.

Approaching Cape Horn, the yacht was pitchpoled by a rogue wave. Beryl, who had been on the helm, was tossed from the boat and injured. Tzu Hang was dismasted, partially submerged, and the topsides were severely damaged, but the three sailors managed to sail the damaged vessel to Chile, where extensive repairs were undertaken. In 1957, a year later, Miles and Beryl departed again to round Cape Horn. However, in approximately the same position, beset by storms, another dismasting took place. Again, they managed to make the coast of Chile, and Tzu Hang was shipped to England for repairs. These adventures were published in their acclaimed cruising book, Once is Enough.

After repairing the vessel, they made a multi-year eastabout circumnavigation. In 1968, they again attempted Cape Horn, westabout, and successfully rounded.

== Later years and the Cochrane Ecological Institute ==
In 1971 they founded the Cochrane Ecological Institute (CEI), dedicated to breeding endangered wildlife. They accomplished the first successful reintroduction of a North American extirpated carnivore back to its home range, the swift fox. Beryl Smeeton died in Cochrane in 1979, and Miles died in 1988, in Calgary, at the age of 83. Their daughter Clio continues to run the CEI.

== Accomplishments, awards and honours ==
Miles Smeeton authored ten books and Beryl two. For their lifetime sailing achievements, the Smeetons were awarded the Blue Water Medal for 1973 by the Cruising Club of America, and other awards from the Liga Maritima del Chile, and the Royal Cruising Club's Medal for Seamanship.

== Tzu Hang ==
In 1969, the Smeetons sold Tzu Hang to a friend, Bob Nance, and they moved to Alberta, Canada. In 1982, Nance sold the ship, and she is reported to have been bought later by a drug dealer, who used her for smuggling marijuana from Colombia to the United States. It is also reported that, in 1988, she was seized by U.S. federal agents in the Virgin Islands and that, in 1989, she sank at her moorings during hurricane Hugo. In 1990, she was destroyed by a bulldozer on a landfill in San Juan, Puerto Rico, allegedly the day before a man arrived who had raised funds to rescue her.
