= St Conor's College =

Coordinates: 54.8686°N 6.5146°W

St. Conor's College
- Portglenone; Northern Ireland

Information
- Type: secondary
- Established: 2018
- Local authority: Education Authority (North Eastern)
- Principal: Maresa Collins
- Gender: Male/Female
- Age: 11 to 18
- Enrolment: 600
- Colour
- Website: https://www.saintconorscollege.com/

St Conor's College is a secondary school located in Northern Ireland. It has two sites. The main site is in the village of Clady and a junior site is located in Kilrea. The school opened in September 2018. It is within the Education Authority (North Eastern) region.

== History ==
The college was formed in 2018 through the amalgamation of St Mary's College, Clady and St. Paul's College, Kilrea.

== Academics ==
The college offers the full range of subjects at Key Stage 3 and 4 and at GCSE A-Level..

== Sports ==
Students have the opportunity of participating in a wide range of sporting activities including Gaelic football, hurling, camogie, soccer, athletics, swimming, netball, basketball, and gymnastics. In 2019, the U-14 footballers won the Ulster Gerry Brown Cup, the U-14 hurlers won the Rehill Cup and the Year 8 Camogie team won both the Derry Vocational School 9 a–side competition and the Ulster Colleges Title.

== Extra-Curricular ==
Students are encouraged to participate in various after school activities other than sport. These include theatre trips, film club, choir, musicals and debating.

== See also ==
List of secondary schools in Northern Ireland
