= Grillagh River =

River in County Londonderry, United Kingdom

Coordinates: 54°52′17″N 6°35′51″W

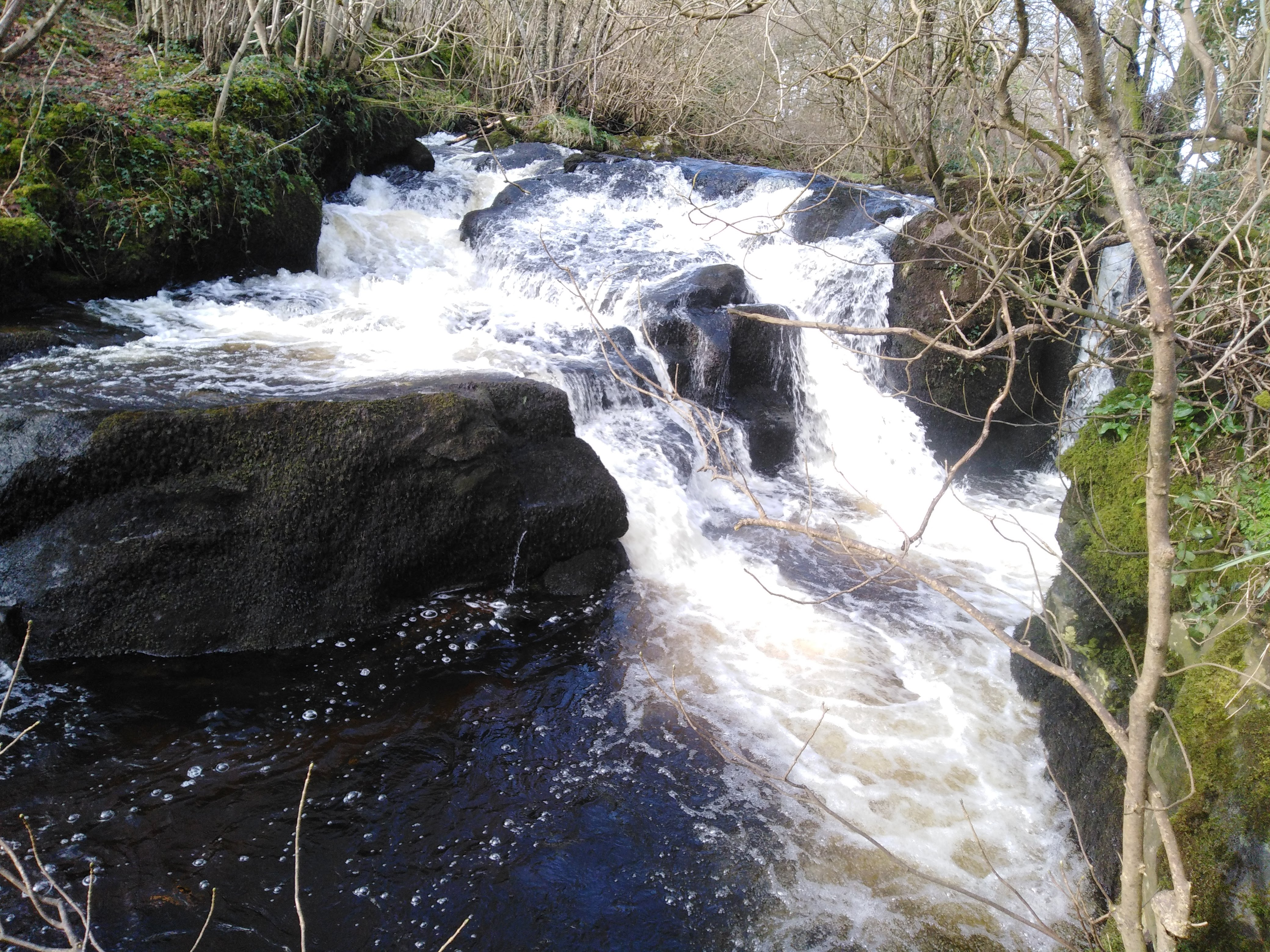
- Grillagh Waterfall

Physical characteristics
- Source
  - location: Sperrin Mountains
- Mouth
  - location: Clady River

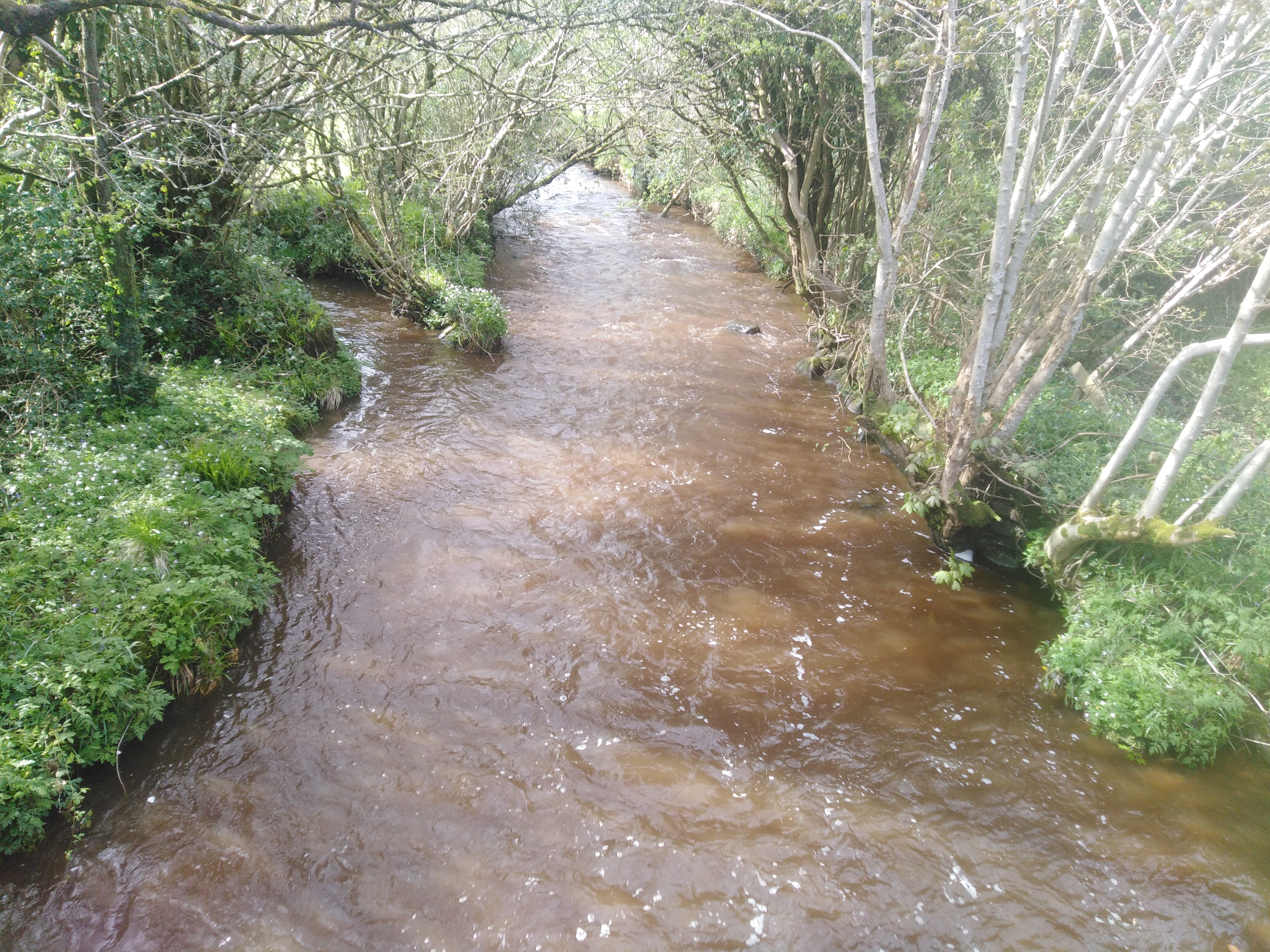
Roughan River

The Grillagh River is a small river located outside Maghera, County Londonderry, Northern Ireland. It starts in Slaughtneil Carntogher Mountain. The Grillagh River Means The Muddy River. Four Arterys Meaning Headstreams start the main river.

The Altkeeran Burn at the foot of Carntogher Mountain is the origins of the Grillagh River meaning Glen of the rowan trees burn this is the main artery and the largest of the mountain burns .which is where most late Autumn Salmon Return to spawn the burn starts on the west side of Carntogher and flows eastward merging with the Carn Burn then flows on passing under Altkeeran Bridge then merging with the Pollan Water Burn [Tullykeeran Burn] and finally the Backparks Burn before formally forming the Grillagh River upstream from Slaughtneil Bridge. The upper Slaughtneil stretch of the river is well known as the Roughan River.

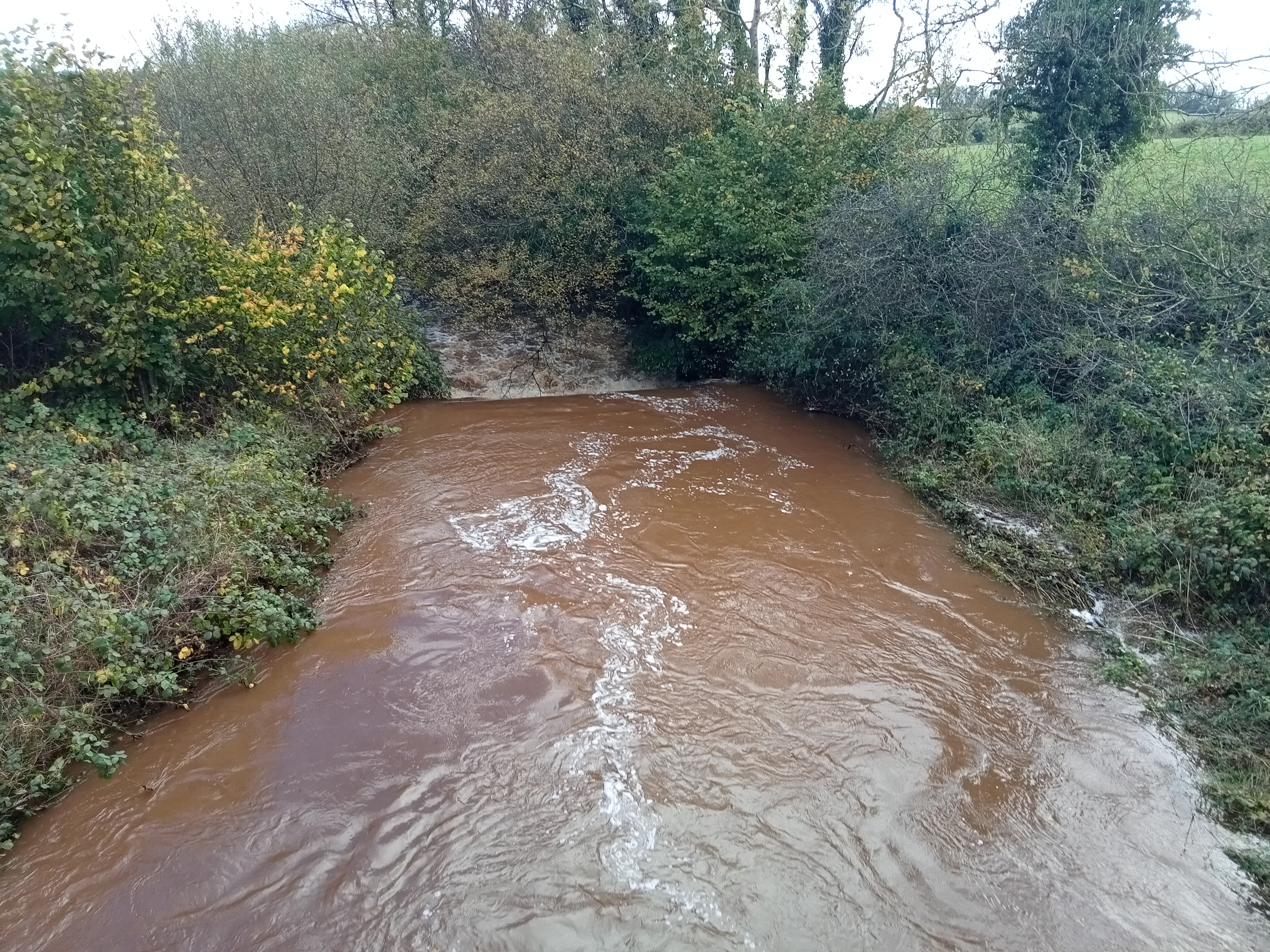
Grillagh In Flood Conditions A29 Grillagh Bridge.

The Carn Burn is another stream meaning Carntogher Burn which starts in the centre of the Carntogher Basin it flows under Cairn Last Bridge then onwards expanding rapidly then flows under the Carn Bridge. Shortly downstream it merges with the Altkeeran.

The Backparks Burn is another artery of the Grillagh River meaning green burn it starts on the east side of Carntogher and flows for a few miles flowing under Backparks Bridge then expanding quickly from a small stream to quite a large mountain burn about the size of the Pollan Water. It also holds a stock of brown trout and salmon which travel upriver for spawning.

The Pollan Water is one of the headwater tributaries that feed the main Grillagh. It starts near Sheefin meaning seat of Finn and flows a few miles before merging with the Altkeeran Burn downstream from the Tullykeeran Bridge.

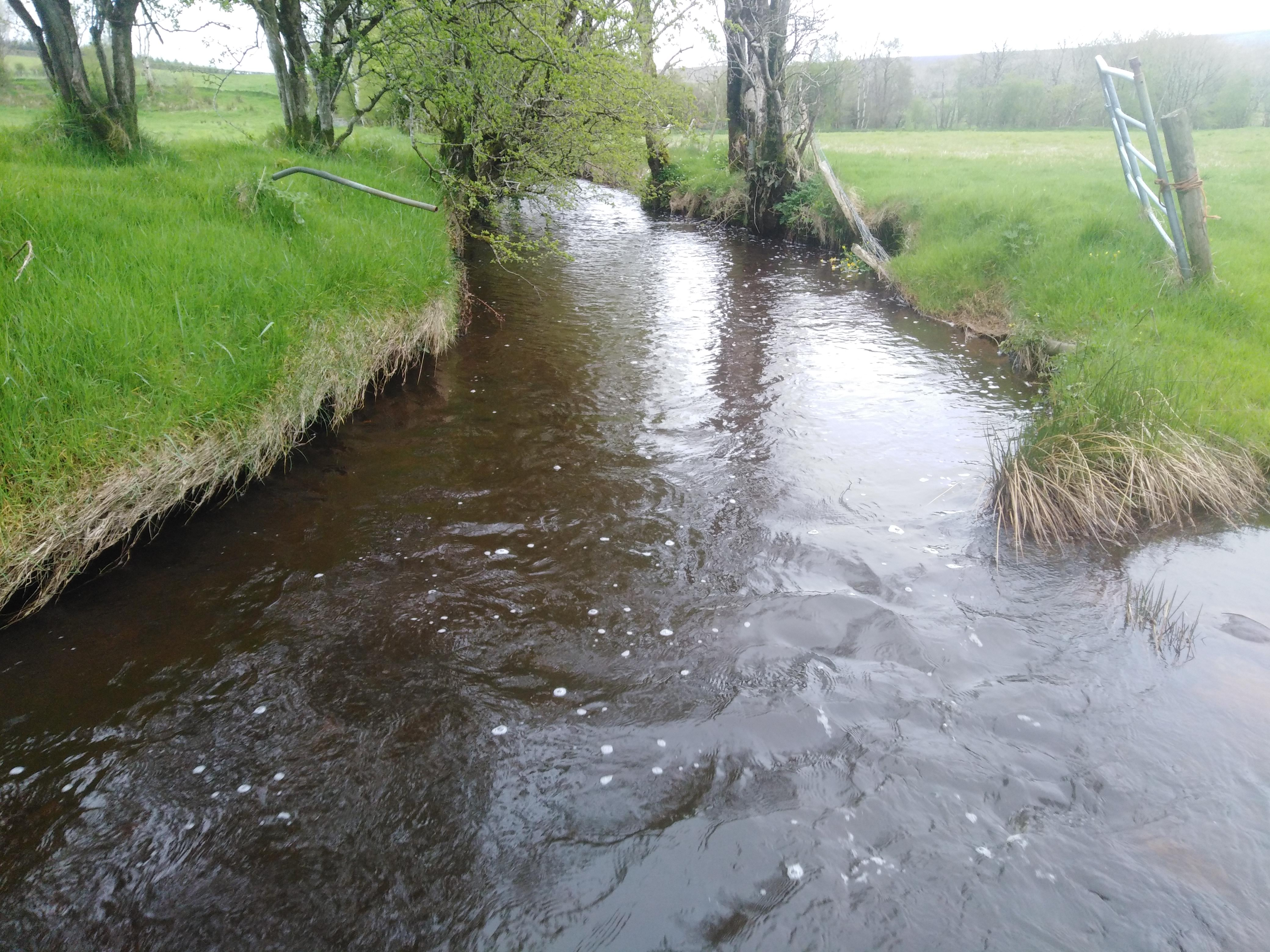
Headwaters of the Grillagh

The name means a wet and mucky area and its also known to locals as Pixies Paradise. It is sourced up on Carntogher Mountain, one of the major peaks of the Sperrins and flows into the Clady. It is regarded as a good fishing river by locals of Maghera, Swatragh and the Clady And District Angling Club. It also flows through the nature reserve of Drumnaph Woods, making it a major checkpoint in the forest reserve. It is known as the "salmon's kingdom in the forest" because of the many fish species — including salmon, Brown Trout, and other smaller fish that is caught from time to time the tend to hide in the rocks or deep under the water the best method on this river for those who are anglers is spin fishing with mepps — these fish migrate upriver to spawn and lay eggs. Often dippers are spotted around the old bridges, where they dive to the bottom in order to feed on a range of aquatic invertebrates. The river itself is a spate river during the winter; it is fast flowing with white rapids. In the summer, the river is a lot lazier, and collects a lot of green algae, especially around Culnady downwards making it difficult for deeper fishing at these times. The river itself is about 5 to 7 metres in the upper reaches and about 10 metres on its lower course. The Grillagh River joins with the Knockoneil River to form the Clady River Below Curdain Bridge near Culnady.

The River is leases by the Clady And District Angling Club funded in 1962.

== Bridges ==
Gortinure Bridge also called Roughan Bridge

There are 7 bridge that cross the Grillagh which include

The Slaughtneil Bridge, Gortinure Bridge, Tirnony Bridge, Upper River.

Grillagh Bridge, Beresford Bridge Middle River.

Culnady Bridge, Curdian Bridge Lower River.

Tributarys

Half Gayne Burn a small stream that joins the river

between Slaughtneil and Gortinure Bridges.

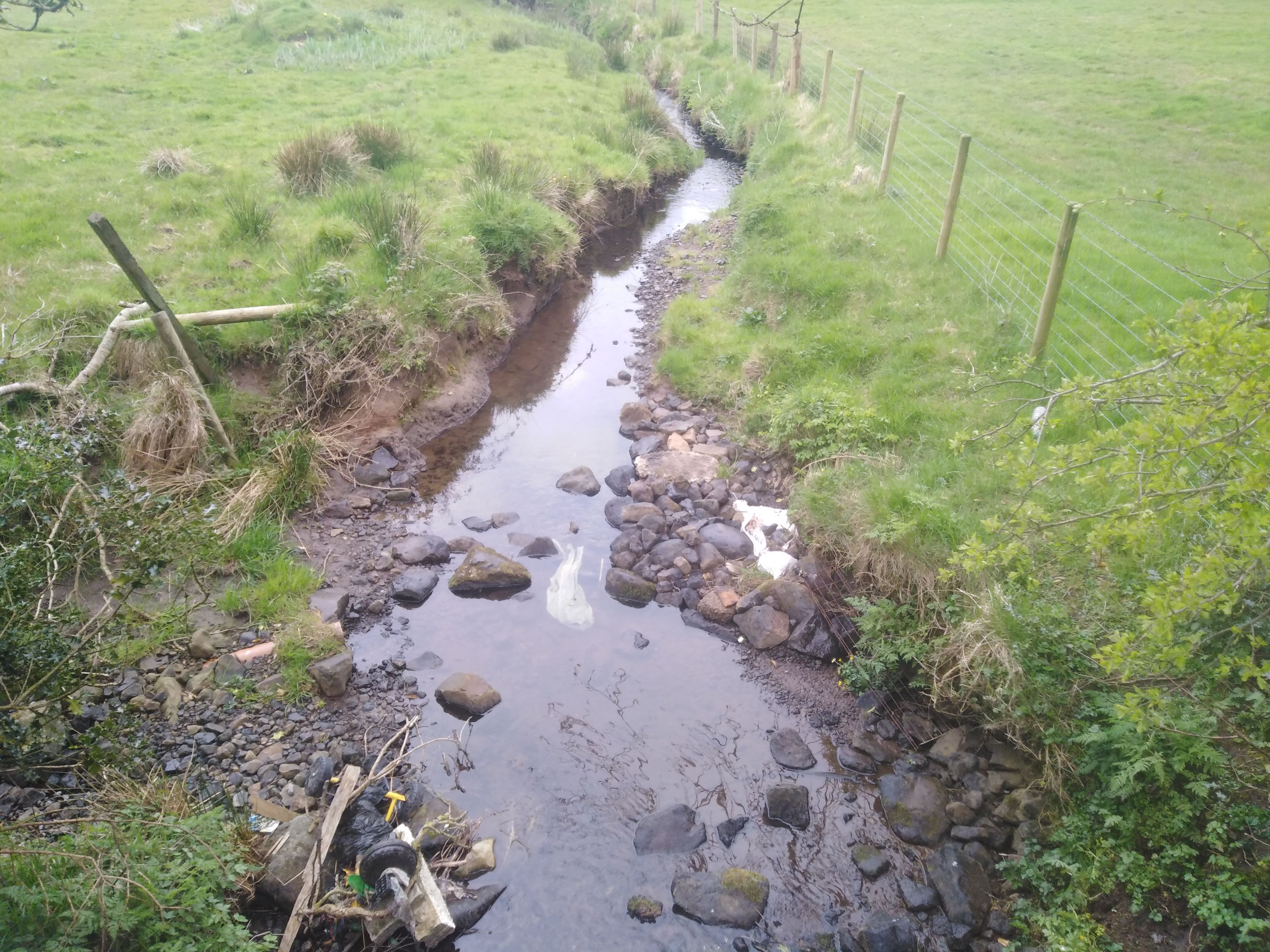
Roohan Burn At School Bridge

The Roohan Burn One of the tributary streams which starts on Tullykeeran Mountain flows through Tirkane Behind The St Brigids Primary is one of the major brown trout spawning streams on the upper river and small trout can sometimes be seen catching flies at the foot of which is locally known as the School Bridge near the Tirkane school and housing estate.

Glebe Drain.

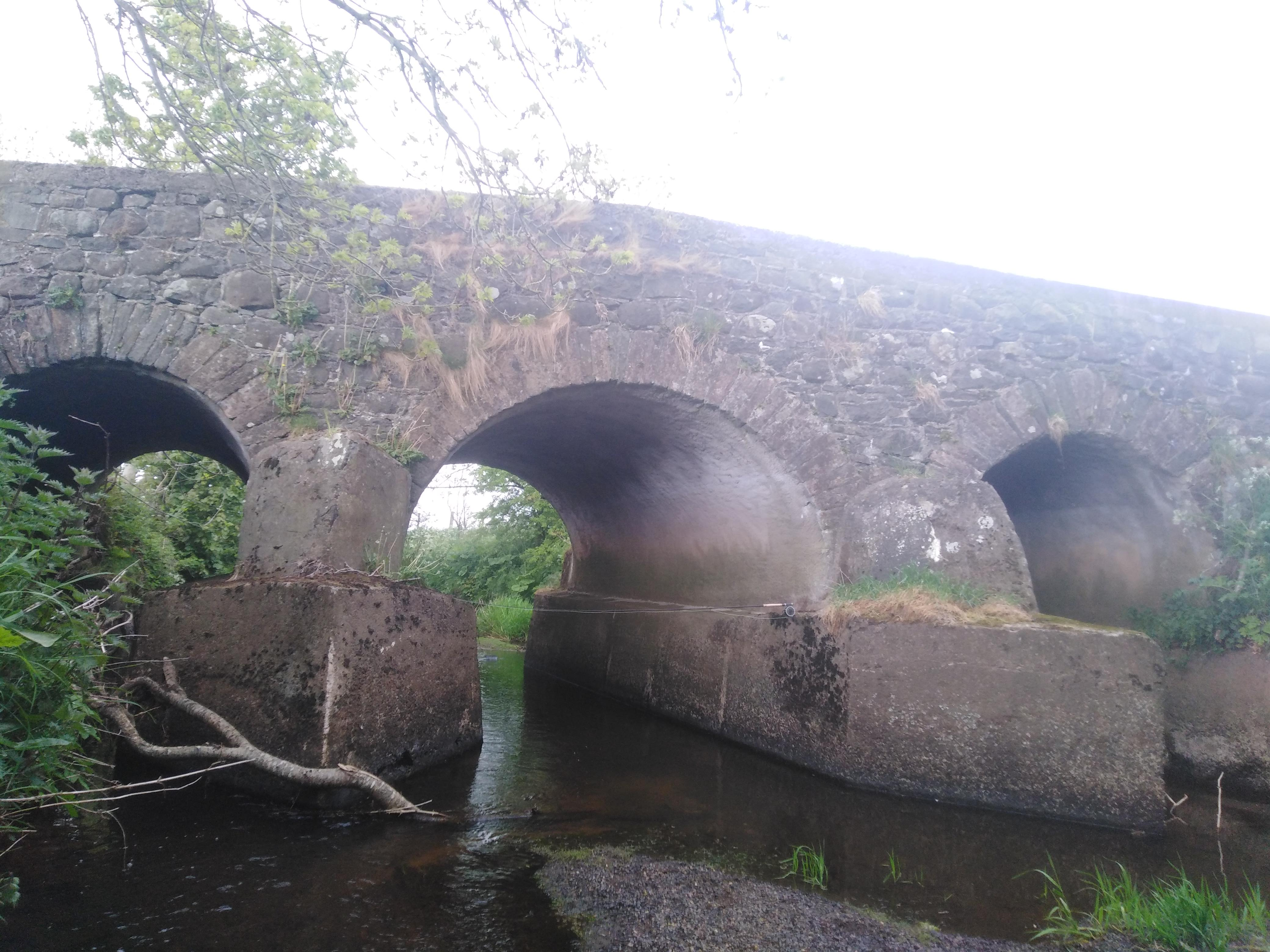
Curdian Bridge

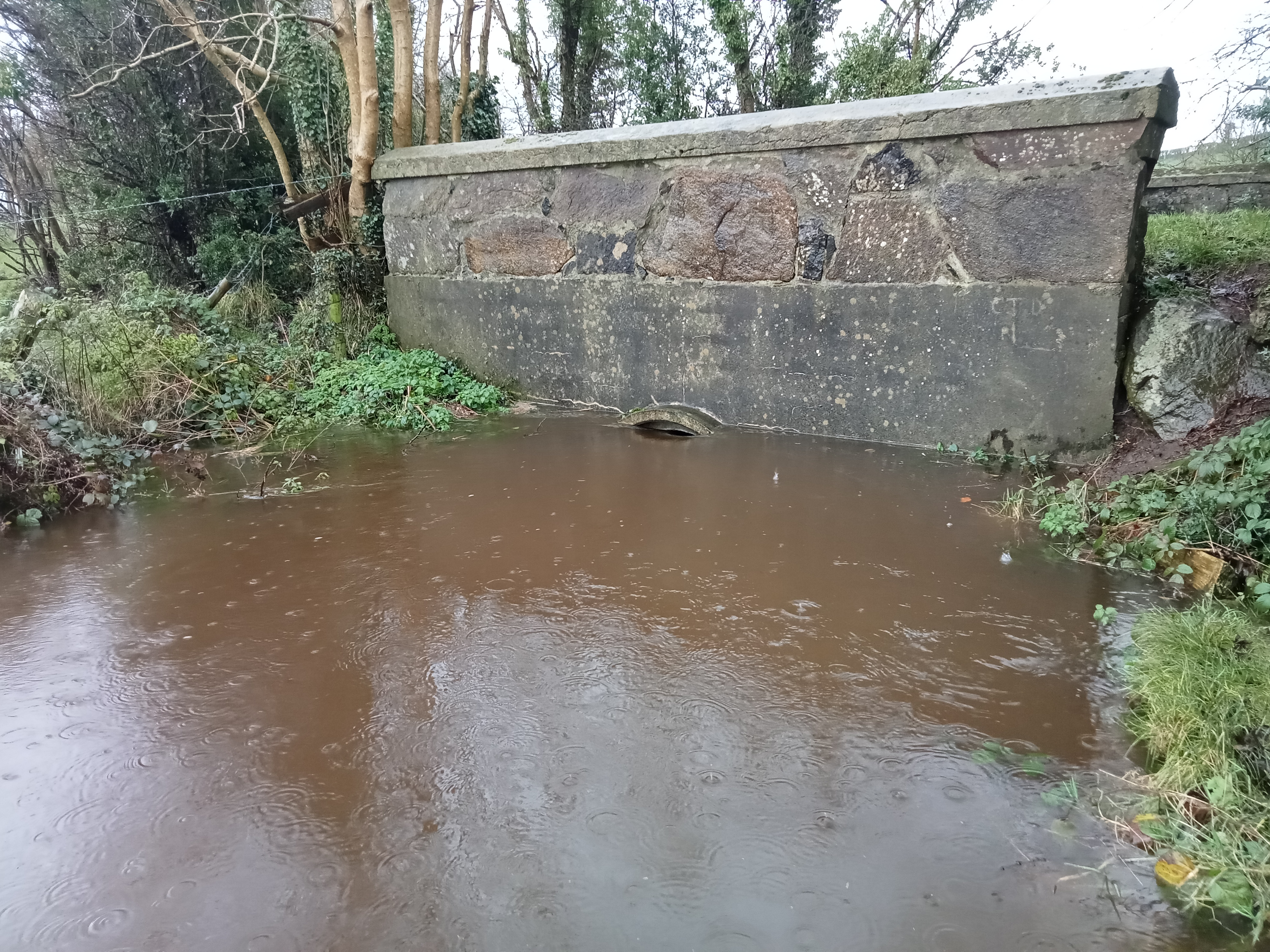
Grillagh Tributary Roohan BurnIn Flood Stages.

Tirnony Burn a small stream that flows through

Tirnony townland into the Grillagh.

Moneysharvin Drain.

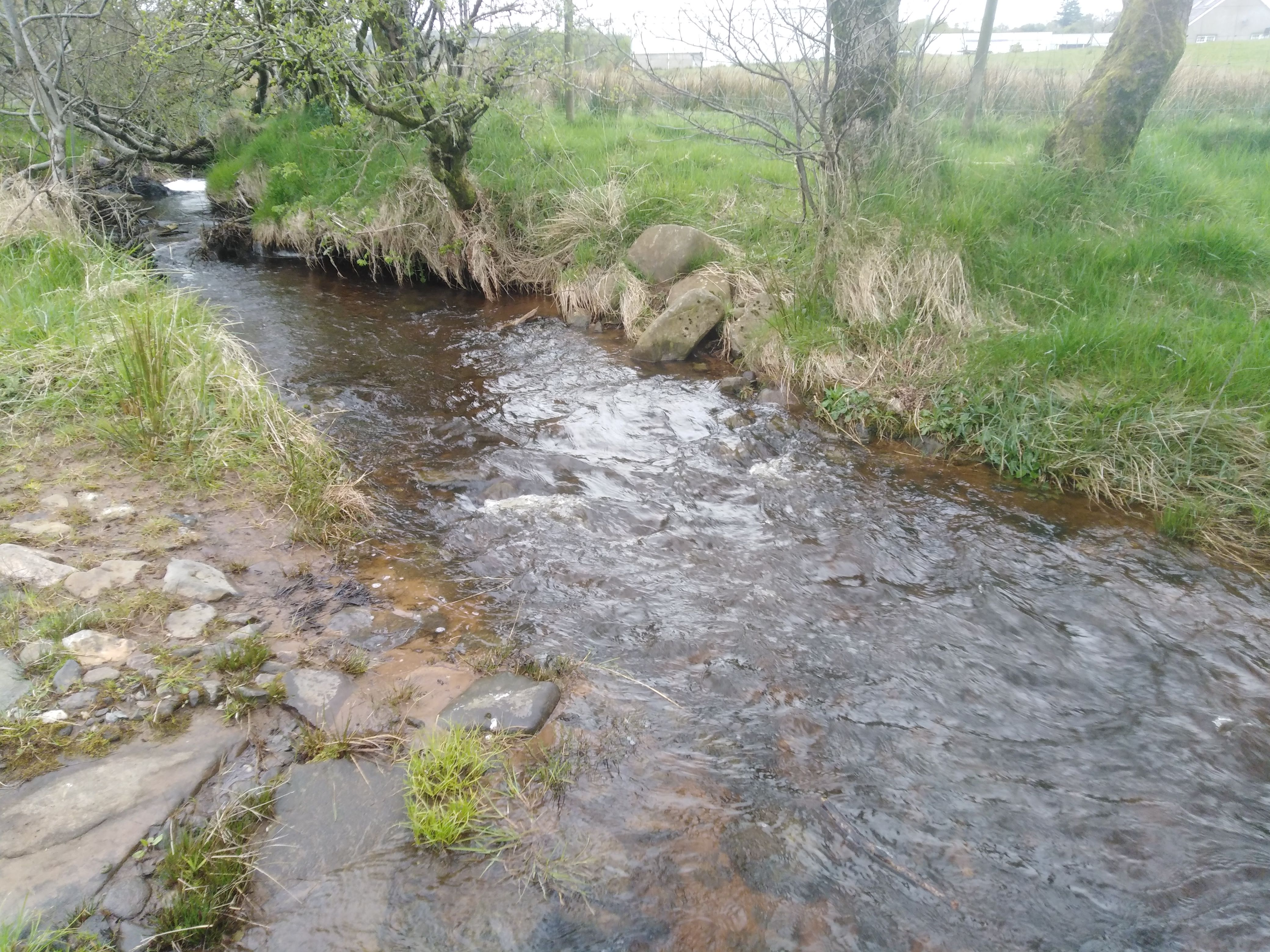
Backparks Burn mountain stream tributary

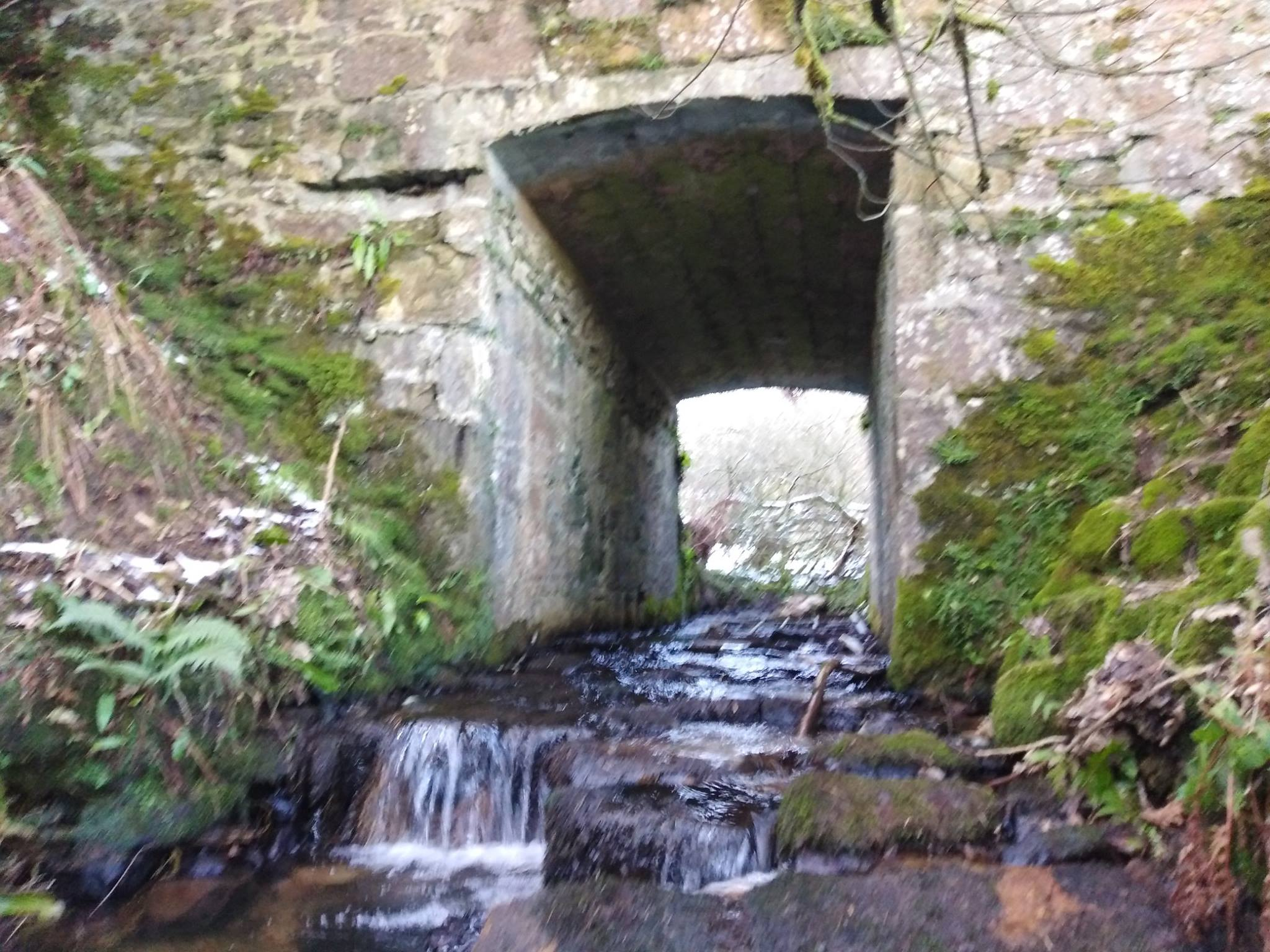
Backparks Bridge

The Curragh Burn Another tributary below Culnady also acts as a brown trout spawning Sheugh.

Drumuck Burn and Dreenan Drain.
