= Augustea SpA =

Italian shipping company

- Industry: Shipping
- Founded: 1629; 397 years ago
- Headquarters: Viale Gramsci, 5, 80122 Naples, Italy
- Website: www.augustea.com

Augustea SpA has deep roots. It is a shipping company from Naples, Italy. The company started way back in 1629. This makes Augustea one of the oldest shipping firms still around. Augustea has seen many changes in the shipping world. They have transported goods across the seas for centuries. Augustea likely began with sailing ships. Today, they operate modern cargo vessels. Their long history shows their ability to adapt. Augustea remains a key player in maritime transport.

The basic facts:

- In 1629 Pietro Antonio Cafiero created a mutual aid fund "Monte della S.S. Annunziata dei Cafiero", which was rescuing sailors kidnapped by Barbary pirates.
- Now Augustea Group employs about 630 people working on company's 50 vessels, tugs and barges and controls another 24 ocean vessels.
- Augustea's fleet fully complies with the International Safety Management Code.
- Augustea Group achieved accreditation ISO 9001 and ISO 14000.

== See also ==
- List of oldest companies
