= Nabeya Bi-tech Kaisha =

Japanese company

- Type: Limited Liability Company
- Industry: Machinery, metal
- Founded: 1560; 466 years ago
- Founder: Taro-Uemon-i Okamoto
- Headquarters: Seki, Gifu, Japan
- Key people: Mitsuo Kaneda (President and CEO)
- Products: Components for machinery
- Revenue: JPY 8 billion (Total of group)
- Number of employees: 410 (Total of group)
- Website: www.nbk1560.com/index_en.html

Nabeya Bi-tech Kaisha (鍋屋バイテック, Nabeya Bitekku), also known as NBK, is a machine component parts manufacturer located in Seki, Gifu, Japan. The company's roots date to 1560, when it began as a metal foundry casting pots, tea kettles and temple bells.

== History ==
NBK’s history dates to 1560, when Taro-Uemon-i Okamoto founded the company. In 1749, the Okamotos received from the Imperial Court a license as a caster. They presented the Kyoto Imperial Palace with a lantern and were given the trade name “Nabeya”, that means "Pan(Pot) shop or artisan". The Okamotos produced many temple bells in Japan. The main branch of the Okamotos runs Nabeya Co., Ltd. while other branches use “Nabeya” as part of the name of the company which they run. "Bi-tech" stands for "Newest and Traditional 2-technologies", and "Kaisha" means "Company or Corporation".

The company in its current form was incorporated by Tomokichi Okamoto in 1940.

== Head office and factory ==
NBK's head office and main factory, NBK Seki Plant, are located in Seki city, Gifu prefecture. The former President, Taichi Okamoto, wanted the site to be a “garden factory” so it is surrounded by a swimming pool, art museum, bar, sports gym, concert hall and training and conference rooms.

Okamoto believed that management concepts such as management by objectives and pay for performance were contrary to the maximization of creativity and productivity, therefore all employees are not bound by any revenue goals and are allowed to act freely.

In 2007, Okamoto resigned his position as President and became the Chairman of NBK. Mitsuo Kaneda was appointed as his successor. Kaneda is the first ever non-Okamoto family member that has been appointed President since the company was established in 1560.
