= Bruce Clark (journalist) =

Bruce Clark (born 30 September 1958) is a British journalist, author, and commentator on international affairs, religion, and history. He is the International Security Editor of The Economist and a former correspondent for Reuters, The Times, and the Financial Times.

Clark is the author of several books, including An Empire's New Clothes: The End of Russia's Liberal Dream (1995), Twice A Stranger: How Mass Expulsion Forged Modern Greece and Turkey (2006), and Athens: City of Wisdom (2021), a cultural history of the Greek capital.

== Background ==
Bruce Clark was born on 30 September 1958 in Northern Ireland. He is the son of Wallace Clark, a Northern Irish author and businessman.

== Work ==
Clark's writing for The Economist usually focuses on religion or defence. He began his career with Reuters, and later served as The Times correspondent in Moscow from 1991 to 1993.

=== An Empire's New Clothes (1995) ===
In 1995, Clark published An Empire's New Clothes: The End of Russia's Liberal Dream, which offers a personal and political account of Russia during the post-Soviet transition.

=== Twice A Stranger (2006) ===
His 2006 book, Twice A Stranger: How Mass Expulsion Forged Modern Greece and Turkey, explores the population exchange between Greece and Turkey mandated by the Treaty of Lausanne in the early 1920s. It received critical acclaim and won the Runciman Award in 2007.

=== Athens: City of Wisdom (2021) ===
In 2021, Clark published Athens: City of Wisdom, a wide-ranging cultural history of the city of Athens. The book examines the city's evolution across three millennia, addressing themes such as democracy, empire, philosophy, identity, and urban life. It was praised for its breadth and clarity.

== Selected works ==
- An Empire's New Clothes: The End of Russia's Liberal Dream (1995) ISBN 978-0099478319
- Twice A Stranger: How Mass Expulsion Forged Modern Greece and Turkey (2006) ISBN 978-0-674-02368-0
- Athens: City of Wisdom (2021) ISBN 978-1781259565
