= Clady River =

River in Northern Ireland

Coordinates: 54°52′45″N 6°29′16″W

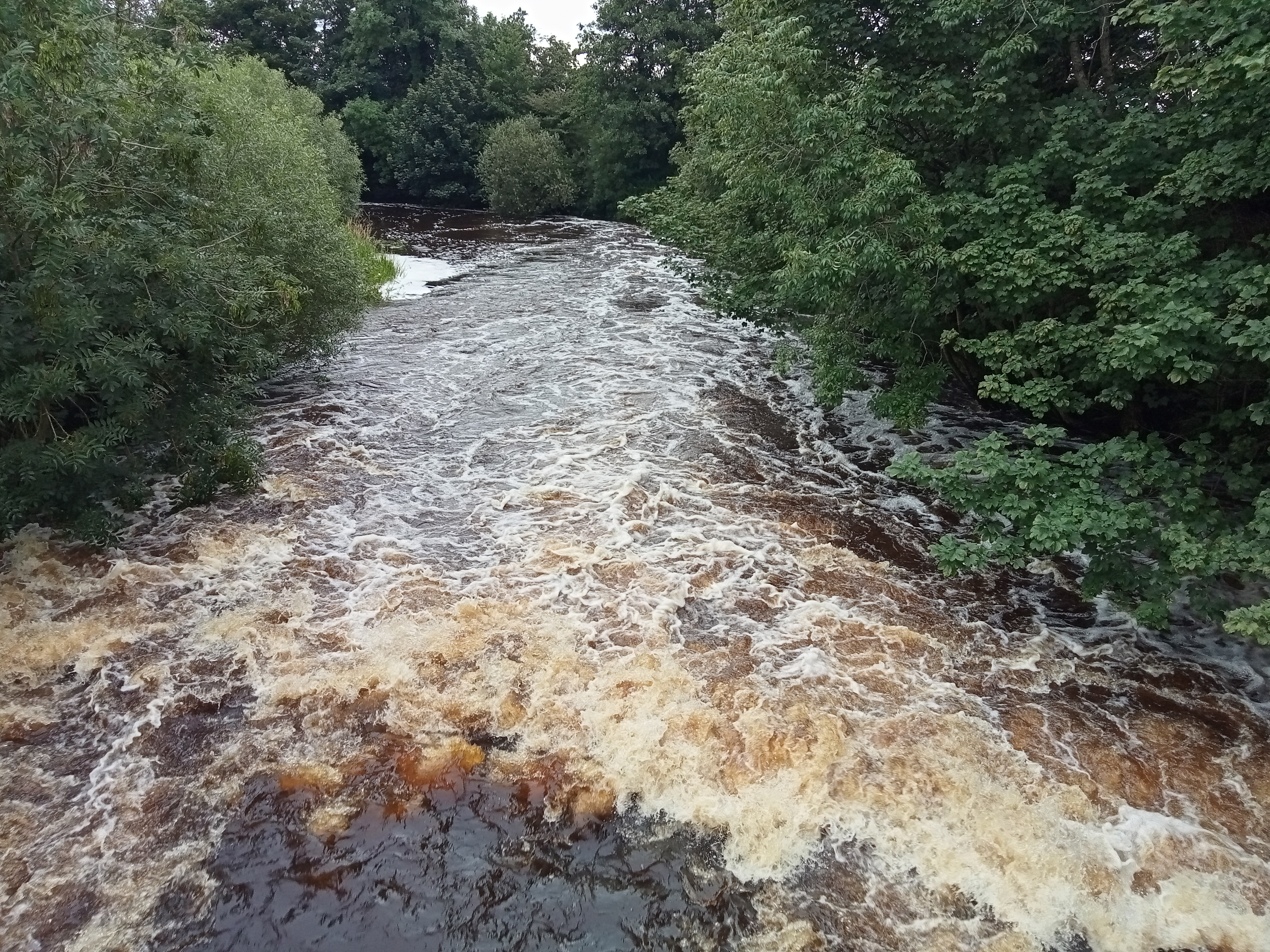
- Clady River Spate Glenone Bridge 2023.

Physical characteristics
- Source
  - location: Grillagh River And Knockoneil River
- Mouth
  - location: River Bann

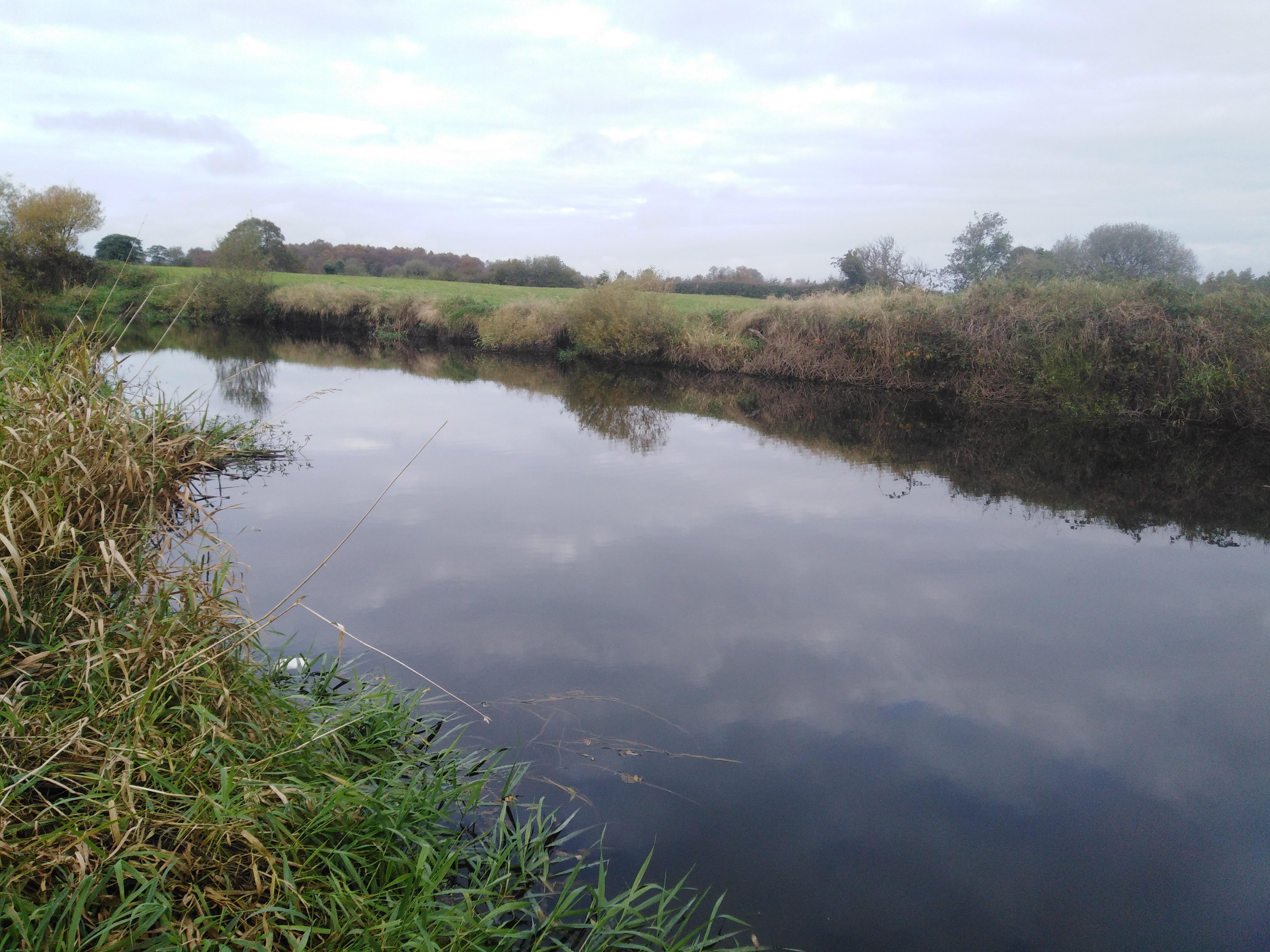
Clady River

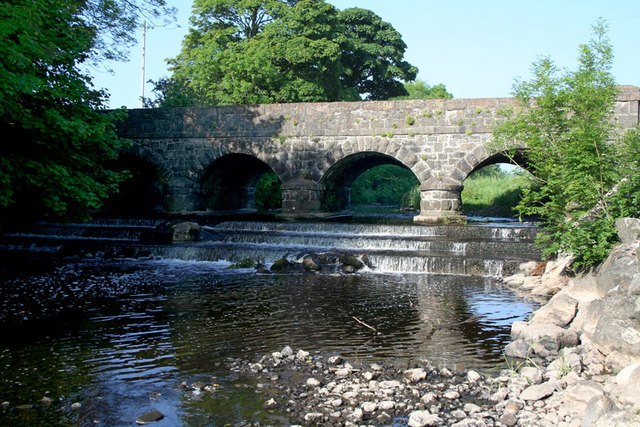
Glenone Bridge over the Clady

The River Clady is a mid-scale river in County Londonderry, Northern Ireland. It is a tributary of the Lower Bann. It starts on Carntogher Mountain and its upper stretch from the source to Upperlands is known as the Knockoneil River. From Upperlands onward it becomes The Clady River. Despite being the main river it is considerably shorter than both its primary tributary the Knockoneil and its secondary tributary the Grillagh.

== Course ==
The river starts near Culnady where the Grillagh River and the Knockoneil River merge. The main river flows onwards from here for some miles and this area often floods during peak flows. The river now flows in silence under Eden Bridge and on through Greenlough, over the weir and past the Clady Clubhouse then through Inishrush under the wee Footstick and then into Clady itself, It flows over Lagans Mill weir down the rocky gorge like riverbed under the Old Clady Bridge, and then settles as it approaches the Glenone Bridge, where the water is 40 foot+ until it meets the River Bann.

The river is of medium scale, and it is measured at Glenone Bridge, an old Victorian bridge under which the river flows before it empties into the Lower Bann. During a flood, it can turn from a quiet trickle to a torrent within a few hours of heavy rain; this led to the drowning of Robert Reid and Agnes Henry in the 1920s when they went over the Clady bridge.

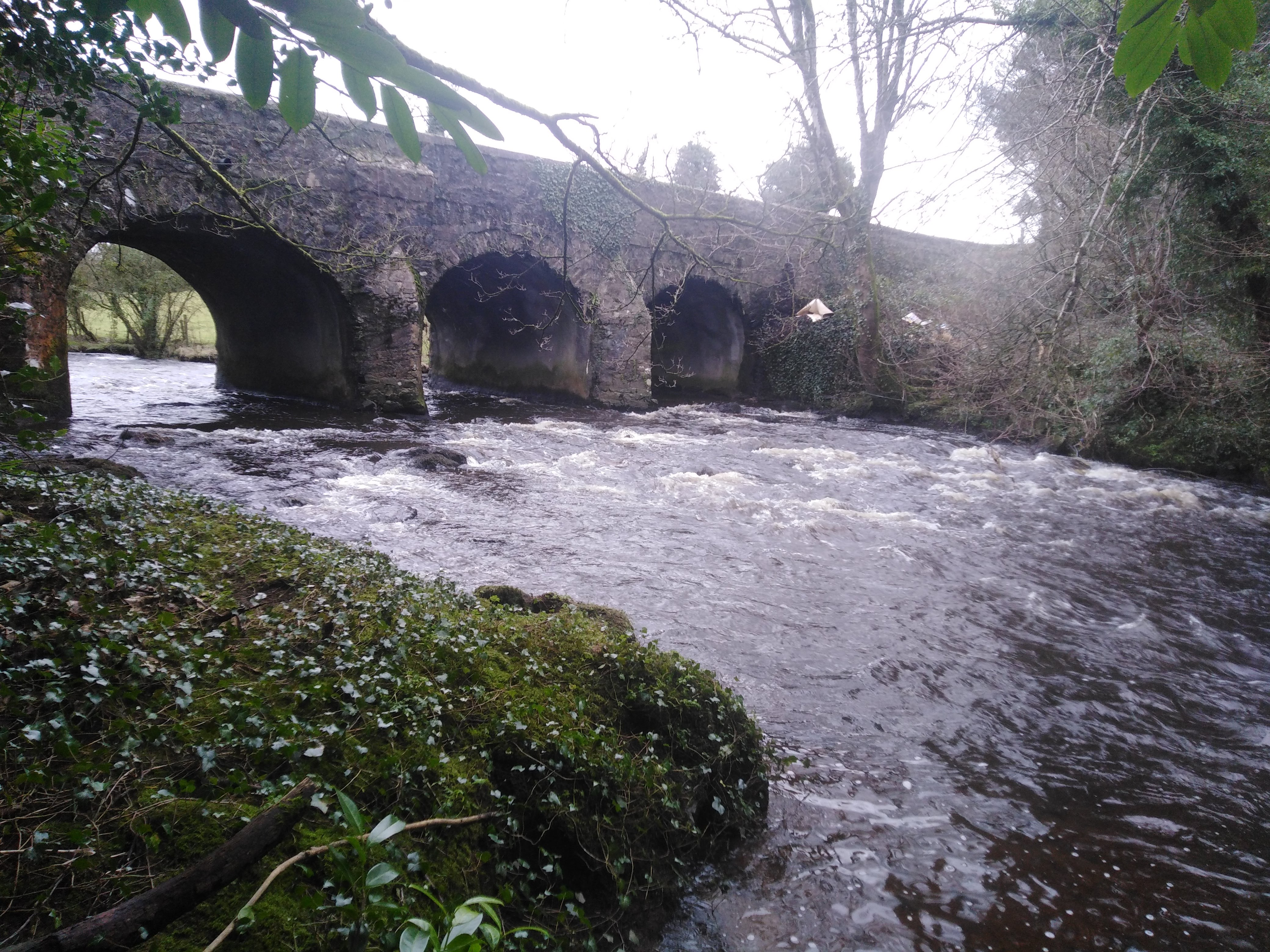
Clady Bridge

=== Bridges ===
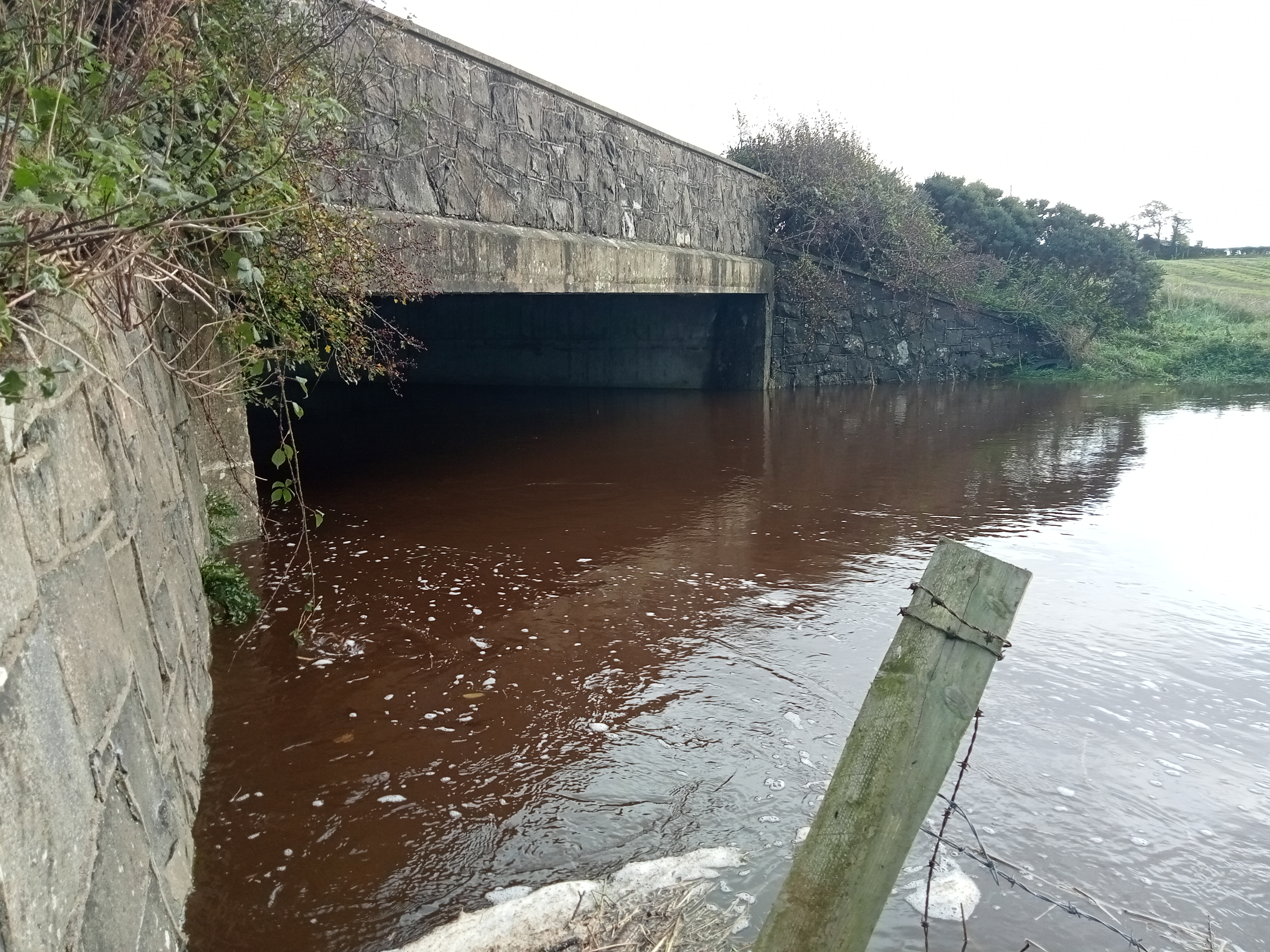
Eden Bridge Flood

There are three major bridges over the Clady River :

- Eden Bridge, Upper River
- Clady Bridge
- Glenone Bridge, Lower River

As well there are many named footstick bridges:

- Lyle Footstick Ballymacpeake
- Newtown Footstick Greenlough Chapel
- Clubhouse Footstick CADAC 2002
- Innishrush Footstick Bridge

=== Tributary rivers and streams ===
The Knockoneil River and the Grillagh River are the main head tributaries to the Clady River. Both rivers start in Slaughtneil.

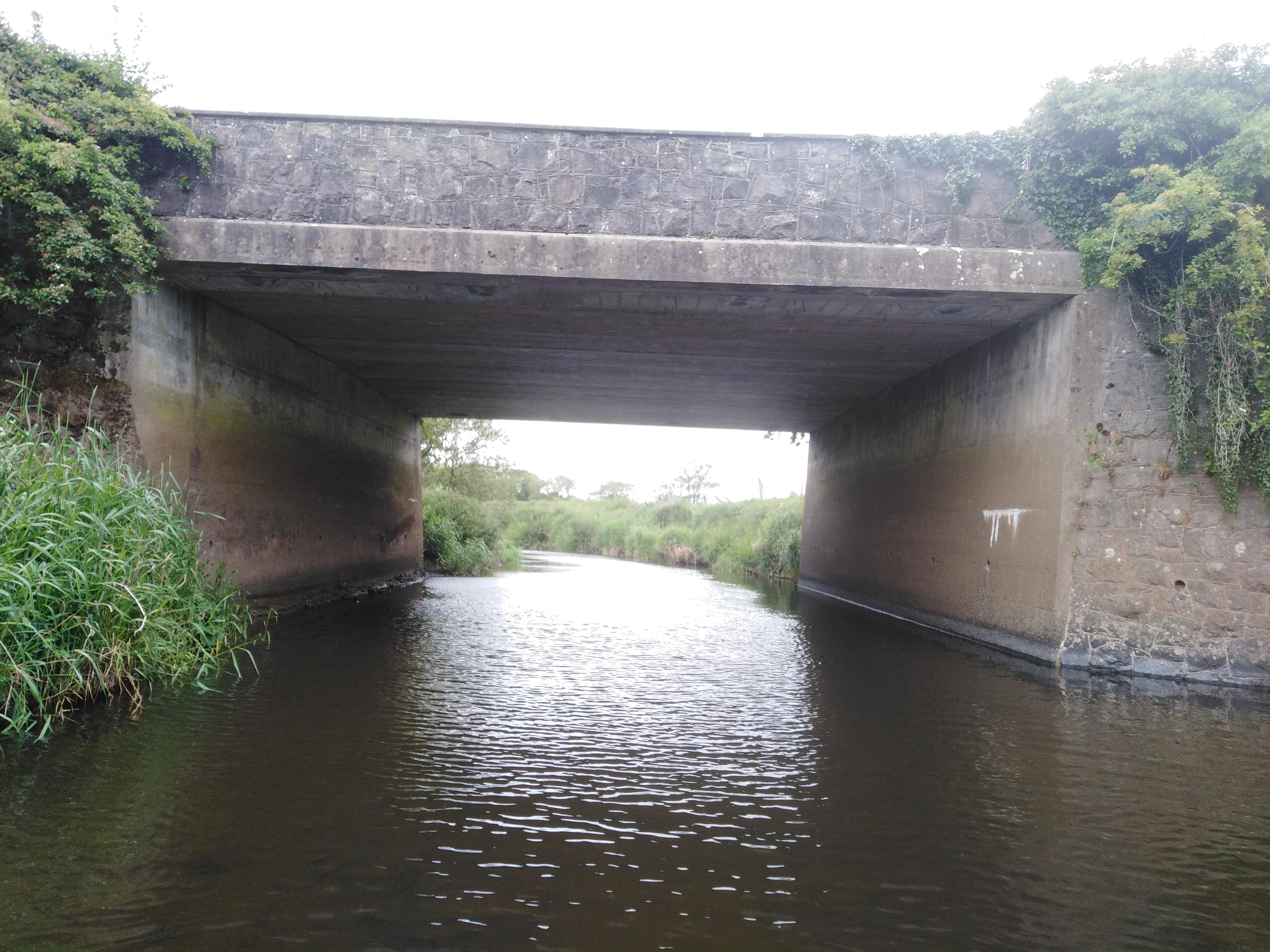
Eden Bridge Normal

Main Drain is a wetland burn that flows through Dreenan townland under Dreenan Bridge on the main Maghera to Portglenone Road and on through ballymacpeake where the Eden Drain joins and under Ballymacpeake Bridge then to the Clady above Lyle Footstick.

Eden Drain: This burn starts in Lavey near Gulladuff and flows under the Lavey Bridge on the main road and then north and swings to the east through the lowlands through Eden south of McGoldrick Transport premises under Annaghclaywood Bridge then into the Main Drain burn in Ballymacpeake.

Gorse Drain.

Drumnacannon Burn a small stream near Tamlaght O Crilly.

Ballymacpeake Sheugh.

Killycon Burn Innishrush.

== Angling ==
There is a fishing club house located along its banks just outside Clady. The facility consists of a fish counter and a weir constructed in 2011 for salmon spawning. Multiple fishing disabed piers are located along the embankment. The best time to catch a fish is in the months of September and October before the fishing season ends on 31 October.

The river's angling rights is leased by the Clady And District Angling Club funded in 1962.
