= Inishrush =

Village in County Londonderry, Northern Ireland

Coordinates: 54°52′20″N 6°31′29″W

Inishrush: Irish: Inis Rois
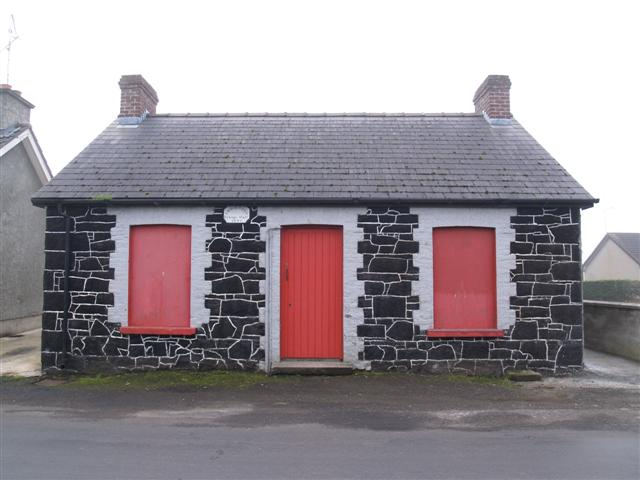
- Inishrush Orange Hall

- Location within Northern Ireland
- Population: 102 (2021 Census)
- Civil parish: Tamlaght O'Crilly
- District: Mid-Ulster
- County: County Londonderry
- Country: Northern Ireland
- Sovereign state: United Kingdom
- Post town: BALLYMENA
- Postcode district: BT44
- Dialling code: 028
- UK Parliament: Mid Ulster
- NI Assembly: Mid Ulster

Innisrush or Inishrush (from Irish Inis Rois, meaning 'island of the woods') is a village and townland near Glenone in County Londonderry, Northern Ireland.

== History ==
The island referred to in the name of the village was in a small lake called Green Lough, which was located north-west of Inishrush until being drained in the 19th century.

Inishrush was a flashpoint during the Home Rule Crisis as it was a Protestant settlement that bordered territory where the Irish Volunteers and Ancient Order of Hibernians were strong.

In 1913, Sunday school children were attacked by nationalists as they made their way to a local fete. Fears of a repeat emerged the following year after a minister received letters threatening violence if the fete were held again. In response, the Ulster Volunteers mobilized 100 armed men to escort the children the one mile from the village to the fete. This time there was no trouble – whether the threats were genuine or the work of a local 'crank' is unknown.

On 17 June 1920, Patrick Loughran, an IRA volunteer, was killed by police when he attempted to burn the village RIC station. This was the first casualty suffered by the IRA in the six counties during the Anglo-Irish War. The police station was eventually closed in 1937.

=== The Troubles ===
On 20 December 1976, 'four raiders' damaged a public house with a bomb packed into a tea chest, firing shots into the building before they made their escape. No one was hurt in this incident. As the pub was Catholic-owned, this attack was likely carried out by the Ulster Volunteer Force (UVF).

On 14 January 1977, James Greer, a Royal Ulster Constabulary (RUC) officer, was killed by the IRA via a booby trap bomb attached to the car outside his parents' home in Inishrush.

== Demography ==
Inishrush recorded a population of 102 residents across 46 households in the 2021 Census.

== See also ==
- List of townlands of County Londonderry
