= Culnady =

Village in County Londonderry, Northern Ireland

Coordinates: 54°51′56″N 6°37′23″W

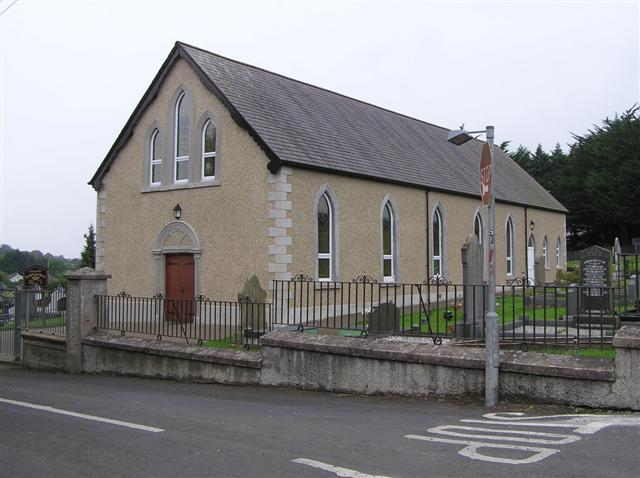
- Culnady Presbyterian Church

- Location within Northern Ireland
- Population: 162 (2021 Census)
- District: Mid-Ulster
- County: County Londonderry
- Country: Northern Ireland
- Sovereign state: United Kingdom
- Post town: Maghera
- Postcode district: BT46
- Dialling code: 028, +44 28
- UK Parliament: Mid Ulster
- NI Assembly: Mid Ulster

Culnady is a small village near Maghera in County Londonderry, Northern Ireland. It is situated within the Mid-Ulster District.

== History ==
=== The Troubles ===
Culnady was an Ulster Defence Association (UDA) base of operations during the 'backlash' period of increased loyalist paramilitary activity in the aftermath of the 1985 Anglo-Irish Agreement.

=== 21st century ===
In July 2002, pro-UDA graffiti was discovered on a local church, which the UDA subsequently claimed was placed there as part of a 'dirty tricks' smear campaign by members of the rival Ulster Volunteer Force (UVF).

On 21 February 2026, a security alert in the Oakvale Terrace area resulted in the discovery of a 'viable' explosive device. PSNI officers imposed a cordon at the scene, which was lifted at 5:00 am the following day.

== Education ==
Culnady Primary School was closed in 2019 due to declining enrolment.

== Demography ==
Culnady recorded a population of 162 residents across 63 households in the 2021 Census.

== Notable people ==
- James Murray (1788–1871) — physician who invented Milk of Magnesia and the first artificial fertilisers

== See also ==
- List of villages in Northern Ireland
- List of towns in Northern Ireland
