= Bann drainage =

The Lower River Bann flows from Lough Neagh, the largest freshwater lake in the British Isles, for 60 km (35 miles), to the Barmouth between Castlerock and Portstewart, where it discharges into the sea. From the end of the last ice age, Lough Neagh has flowed along this natural valley, but a couple of constrictions controlled the flow and led to large fluctuations in the water level along the shoreline, disrupting farming activities on a large scale. The drainage and navigation system has been significantly modified twice in the last couple of centuries to increase the reliability of farmland.

== McMahon Scheme ==
Robert Manning 1860s

== Monck's Report ==
Lord Monck 1882

== Binnie’s Report ==
In 1905, Sir Alexander Binnie, at the time the President-Elect of the Institution of Civil Engineers, was appointed to investigate and report on the drainage of Lough Neagh and the River Bann. After several months study, he reported in 1906, while he was President of the Institution of Civil Engineers. As well as investigating catchment area, rainfall, and particular floods, he concluded on the causes of flooding and presented proposals for remedy with estimated costings. However, the government did not have the funding to carry out these plans.

== Crofts' Report ==
Freeman Wills Crofts, eminent Irish engineer and literary writer, and nephew of Berkeley Deane Wise, chaired an inquiry into the Bann and Lough Neagh Drainage Scheme in 1929, the last commission of his professional engineering career.

== Shepherd Scheme ==
Major Percy Shepherd 1930s
