= Derrytrasna =

Village in County Armagh, Northern Ireland

Coordinates: 54°30′N 6°28′W

Derrytrasna: Irish: Doire Trasna
- Location within Northern Ireland
- Population: 249
  - Belfast: 22 mi (35 km)
- District: Armagh City, Banbridge and Craigavon
- County: County Armagh
- Country: Northern Ireland
- Sovereign state: United Kingdom
- Post town: CRAIGAVON
- Postcode district: BT66
- Dialling code: 028
- Police: Northern Ireland
- Fire: Northern Ireland
- Ambulance: Northern Ireland
- UK Parliament: Upper Bann
- NI Assembly: Upper Bann

Derrytrasna (from Irish Doire Trasna) is a small village and townland in County Armagh, Northern Ireland. The village is on a plateau surrounded mainly by bogland in the north of the county. It lies between Lough Neagh, Lough Gullion and the River Bann.

== History ==
At the turn of the 19th century, Derrytrasna was no more than a small collection of properties at a crossroads on the main road from Portadown to Charlestown. The main industries at this time were fishing and agriculture, and the area was noted for its eel, pollan and trout.

One of the most notable events in the history of the village was the destruction of St Mary's Roman Catholic Church on 6 January 1839. The nearly completed church building was destroyed in what was known as the "Night of the Big Wind". At the time, the Newry Reporter stated:

We regret to learn that the new Chapel of the Parish of Seagoe, which had been erected at great expense and with extreme exertion on the part of the Parish Priest, the Rev. Morgan, was levelled to the ground by the late fearful hurricane. It had just been roofed and would soon have been ready for consecration. This is a lamentable occurrence. The people of Seagoe were rejoicing in the hope of having a temple for the worship of the Most High, and just when it seemed secure to them they have lost the fruit of their long and pious labours. We are sure that the case will strongly excite the sympathies of the Christian public and that any appeal which may be made by the Rev. Mr. Morgan to repair the injury which has been done in this parish will meet with a ready and generous response.
"A ready and generous response" was indeed made to Dr. Morgan's appeal, and the church was rebuilt during the years 1839–41.

In the 1950s Loughview Terrace was developed on Derrytrasna Lane, but the growth of Derrytrasna only really started in the 1980s with the development of Derrytrasna Close and Derrytrasna Lane estates. Lisnagade Mews and Loughview Manor were subsequently added, and lately the two new estates of Bann Close and Derryloiste Meadows have been developed.

== Today ==
The village comprises mainly residential development – most of which consists of modern bungalows – and acts as a small service centre to the surrounding rural community, with a church, a primary school and a post office facility. Most local people work in larger settlements such as Lurgan, Portadown or Belfast, but there is some employment within Derrytrasna and the surrounding area.

== Sport ==
Derrytrasna's local Gaelic football club is Highmoss Sarsfields GFC.

== Education ==
- Seagoe Church of Ireland Maintained School
- St. Mary's Primary School
