= Spelga Reservoir =

Reservoir on the River Bann in Northern Ireland

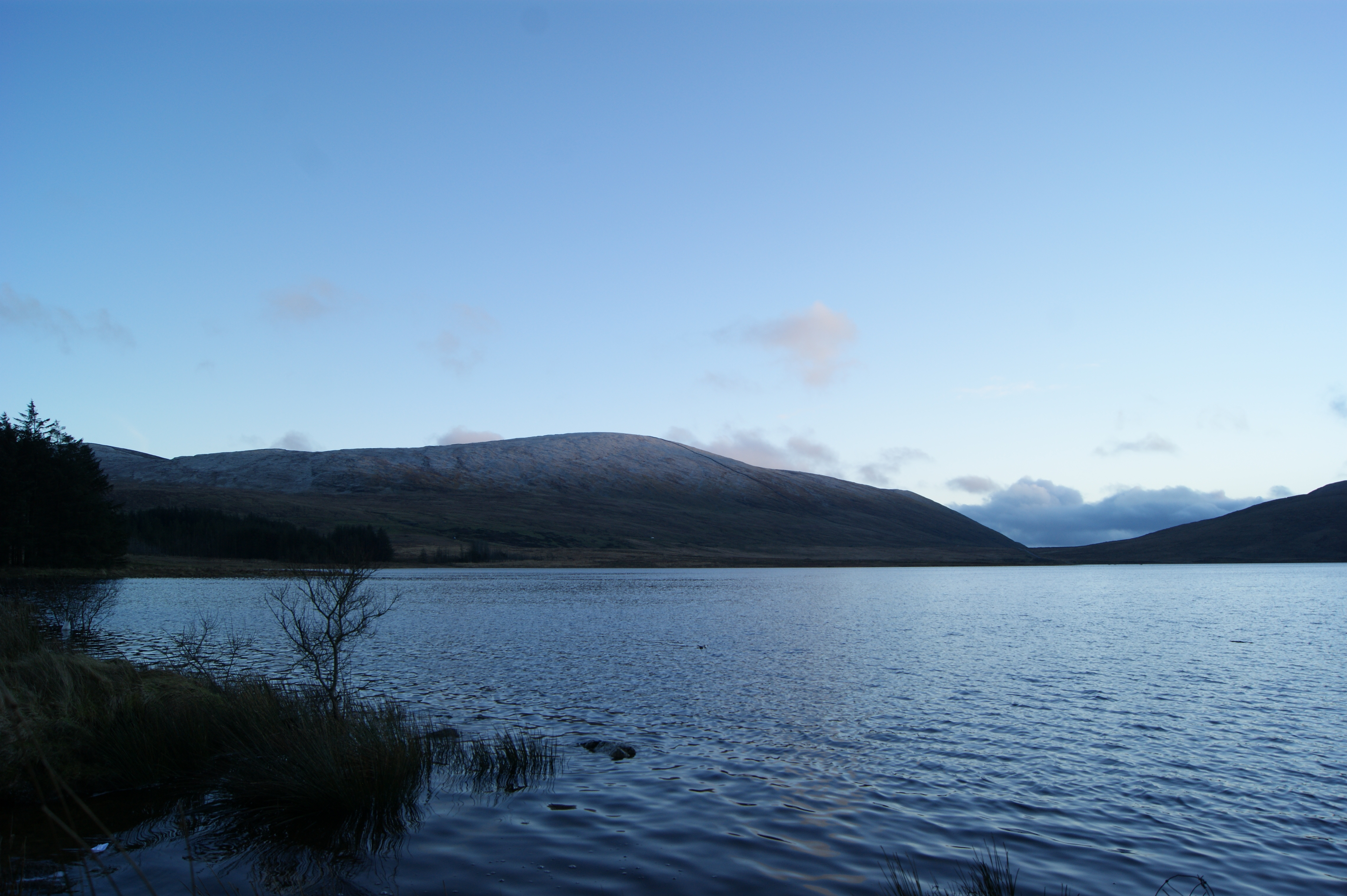

- Location within County Down
- Location: County Down, Northern Ireland
- Coordinates: 54°10′25″N 6°3′38″W
- Type: reservoir
- Catchment area: 1,340 acres (5.4 km^{2})
- Basin countries: United Kingdom
- Water volume: 600×10^{6} imp gal (2,700,000 m^{3})
- Surface elevation: ~ 1,200 ft (370 m)
- Islands: none

Spelga Reservoir is a reservoir in the townland of Spelga (Irish: Speilgeach, meaning 'abounding in pointed rocks') in the Mourne Mountains of County Down, Northern Ireland. It was formed by the Spelga Dam and sits at over 1,200 ft (370 m) above sea level. It has a volume of 2,700,000 cubic metres and a catchment area of 5.423 km^{2}. It occupies an area known as Deers Meadow, and impounds the River Bann, which rises on the nearby Slieve Muck.

== Construction ==
The reservoir and dam were built as part of a project that had origins in the idea of supplying water to Belfast, in 1894. The Spelga Reservoir itself was developed between 1953 and 1957. As part of the construction, the B27 road was rebuilt above the reservoir to replace the original road submerged by the construction. The Dam was designed by the Belfast engineering firm of R. Ferguson and S. McIlveen and construction was undertaken by John Laing & Sons.

Prior to the construction of the reservoir, archaeological excavation was carried out and three groups of transhumant buildings, or booley huts, were identified. Some of the structures were dated to the eighteenth century, but it is thought that the site had been used since pre-historic times due to the presence of flint flakes.

== Use ==
The Portadown and Banbridge areas receive their water supply from the reservoir. Whilst it has not been stocked with fish for some years, it is home to wild pike and trout. In 2018 and again in 2020, heatwaves and dry weather caused the water level to drop. This exposed a portion of the original road through the Deers Meadow, including a bridge which was formerly the first bridge on the River Bann.

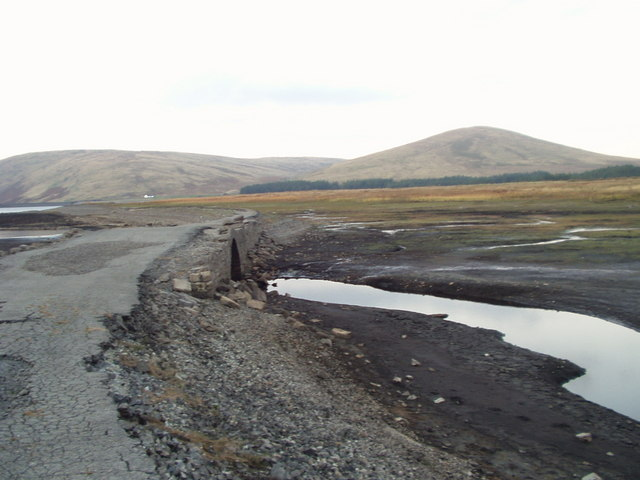
The old bridge and road, exposed during low water levels.

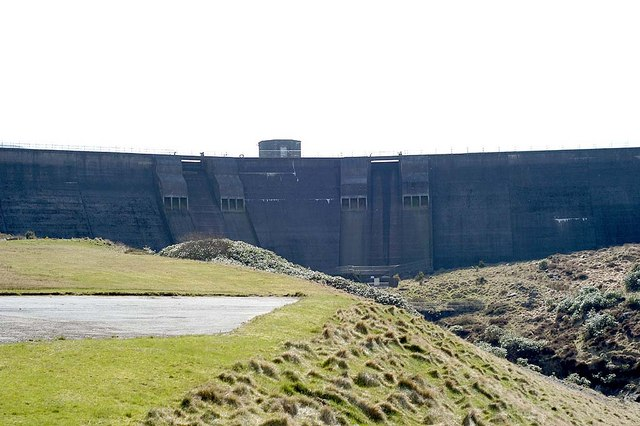
Spelga Dam

== Sources ==
- Ritchie, Berry (1997). The Good Builder: The John Laing Story. James & James.
