= Bann Bridge =

Railway bridge in Northern Ireland

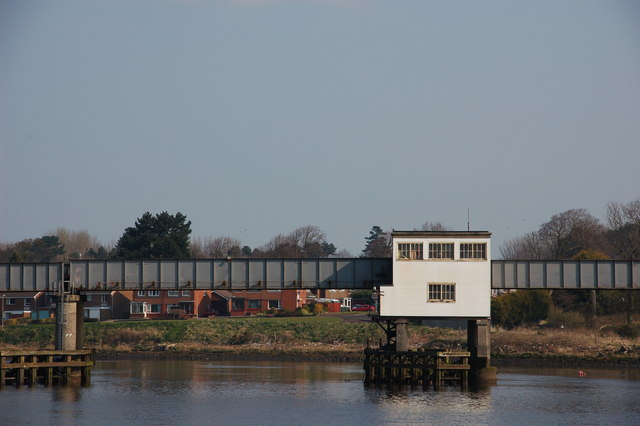
- Coordinates: 55°08′21″N 6°40′19″W
- Carries: Belfast to Derry Railway
- Crosses: River Bann
- Locale: Coleraine
- Maintained by: Translink
- Preceded by: Coleraine Bridge
- Followed by: None

Characteristics
- Design: Girder Lift Bridge
- Total length: 787 feet (240 m)

History
- Opened: 1924

Location
- Interactive map of Bann Bridge

The Bann Bridge is a railway bridge in Coleraine, County Londonderry. It is the only railway bascule bridge in Northern Ireland. It is located downstream from the Coleraine Bridge.

== Design ==
The bridge is composed of Dorman Long steel girders on reinforced concrete piers, which themselves rest on precast concrete piles. There are 10 spans about 23m apart, 4 on the Derry side of the lifting span, the lifting span itself, and 5 on the Coleraine side. The lifting span is 25m long, single leaf, and weighs 250 tons, counterbalanced by an underhung concrete block. The bridge carries trains on a single track about 7m above the River Bann and is roughly 5m wide. In total it is 240m long.

== History ==
The current bridge replaced its predecessor, slightly further upstream, in 1924. It carried the Northern Counties Committee line between Belfast and Derry and cost £100,000 (£5,718,383.23 in 2017).

The bridge was closed in 2012 for refurbishment, which was carried out by F.P. McCann.

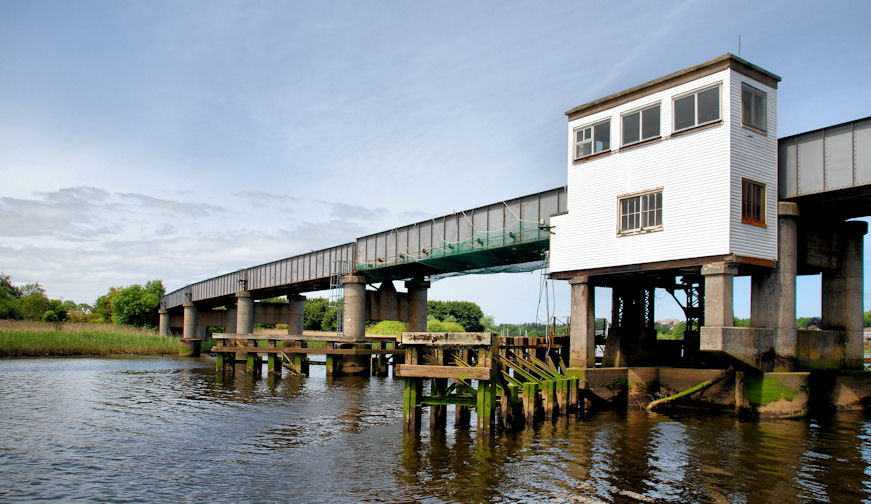
The Bann Bridge

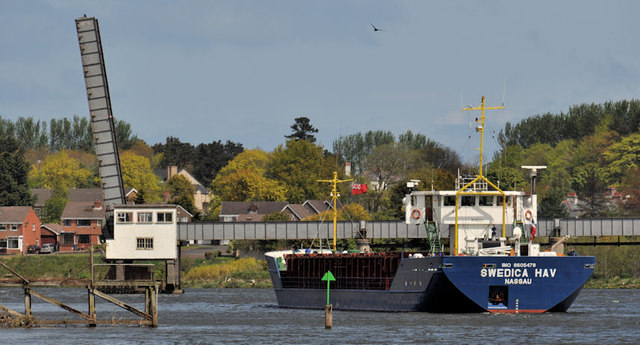
Ship approaching the Bann Bridge

The bridge is still in use today, carrying the NI Railways Belfast–Derry line. The lifting span is still operational and a special signalling system prevents trains from being in the section whilst the bridge is open.
