= Bannfoot =

Village in County Armagh, Northern Ireland

Coordinates: 54°30′N 6°31′W

Bannfoot: Irish: Bun na Banna
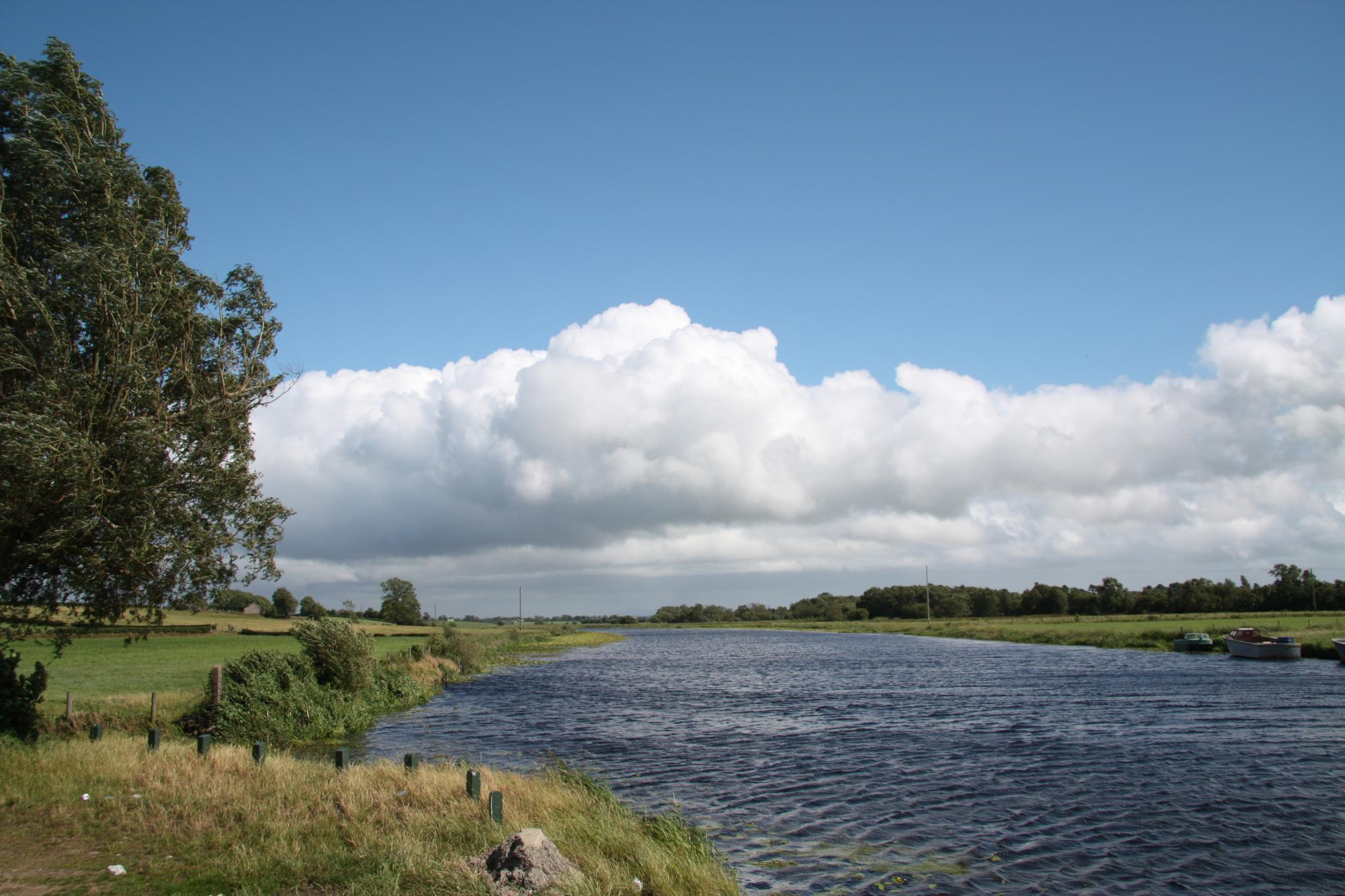
- River Bann at Bannfoot

- Location within Northern Ireland
  - Belfast: 24 mi (39 km)
- District: Armagh City, Banbridge and Craigavon
- County: County Armagh
- Country: Northern Ireland
- Sovereign state: United Kingdom
- Post town: CRAIGAVON
- Postcode district: BT66
- Dialling code: 028
- Police: Northern Ireland
- Fire: Northern Ireland
- Ambulance: Northern Ireland
- UK Parliament: Upper Bann
- NI Assembly: Upper Bann

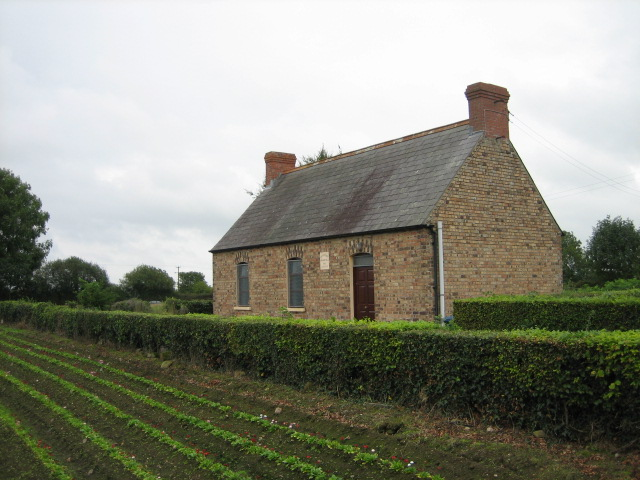
Bannfoot Orange Hall

Bannfoot (Irish: Bun na Banna) is a small village in the townland of Derryinver, County Armagh, Northern Ireland. It sits where the Upper Bann flows into Lough Neagh.

== History ==
The surrounding area was originally known as Bun na Banna, and this name has been adopted as the modern Irish for Bannfoot. There was once a fort at the mouth of the Upper Bann known as Bun an Bhealaigh, meaning "end of foot of the road or pass". This fort has been anglicised in past as "Fort Bunvalle".

In 1760 reference is made of the "Bann Foot Ferry" (sic). Charles Brownlow (1st Baron Lurgan) began building the Bannfoot cottages, to be named Charlestown in the late 1820s. Brownlow, in sitting Charlestown at the mouth of the Bann, was relying on the continued commercial success of the water routes which criss-crossed the southern part of the Lough. Barge loads of turf were sent from the Montaighs to Portadown and from there on to Scarva, Poyntzpass, Gilford and Banbridge.

A permanent bridge over the river at the Bannfoot was to be an integral part of the Charlestown development for Brownlow as it would have been the first proper link between his Montaighs and Richmond Estates. The ferry at the Bannfoot which survived until 1984 linked the Lurgan-Derrytrasna Road with the Columbkille-Maghery Road and saved the traveller at least 12 miles of a detour. The proposed bridge would have been a permanent link between Lurgan and Charlestown in Oneiland West and the Manor of Richmond and Stewartstown in Oneiland West. It is claimed he intentionally erected it equidistant (seven miles) each from Portadown, Lurgan and Stewartstown.

The Grant Jury approved the plan for the bridge as well as the proposed toll charges but the bridge was never constructed. The Canal Company objected as they felt the presence of the bridge would restrict the amount and scope of the future boat traffic in Lough Neagh, the River Bann and Newry Canal. Little did they know when the railways arrived in 1841 their business would be greatly reduced anyway.

The plan for the bridge was so far advanced that the tolls for crossing were already agreed. A coach drawn by 6 horses would cost 1s 6d, a carriage and one horse would be 0s 3d and one man, woman or child would be charged a halfpenny

A ferry was operated by the Wilson family for most of the 20th century, but it no longer exists, and a bridge has never been constructed across the river, but there have been calls for a bicycle and pedestrian bridge as a means of boosting tourism.
