= Agivey River =

River in Northern Ireland

Coordinates: 55°02′36″N 6°34′41″W

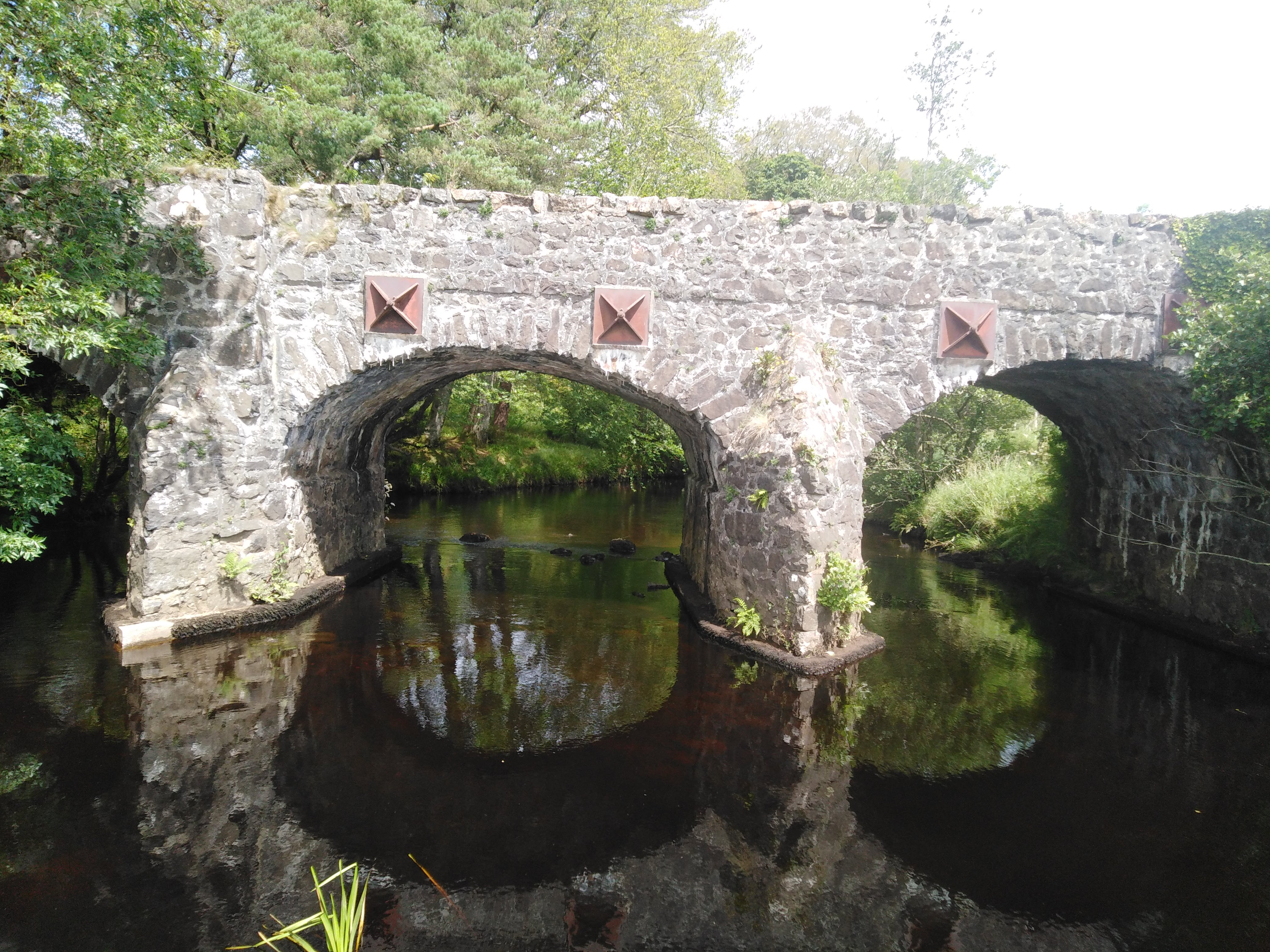
Errigal Bridge

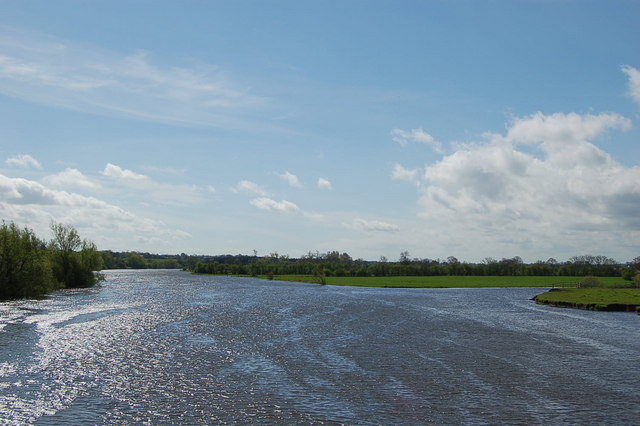
Confluence of the Bann from the left and the Agivey from the right

The Agivey River is a medium to large river in County Londonderry. It starts at the confluence of the Ashlamaduff and Formill Rivers up in The Sperrin Mountains in Glenullin and flows through said area and flows onwards Eastward direction towards Garvagh.The river flows through Errigal Glen a massive gorge on the river with a 20-meter drop from the top to the river, Errigal Bridge at the start of the glen is said to be one the oldest bridges in Ireland. The river flows through Garvagh over the famous horseshoe weir onwards north towards aghadowey then turns east again. It passes Hunters mill and under the Bovagh Bridge. It flows through Bovagh house estate which is now a b&b. The river flows for the last few miles north passing Cullycapple Bridge and Brickhill Bridge passes the Brown Trout inn and joins with the Aghadowey River then flows eastwards for a final time under Glasgort Bridge then into the River Bann. It joins the River Bann near Ballymoney. It is one of NI Game Angling Rivers it has its own angling association called The Agivey Angling Association Methods of fishing include Fly, Spinning And Worming, It boasts a healthy stock of fish including Salmon and Brown Trout.

It was featured on John Wilson's Go Fishing Series Episode Salmon.

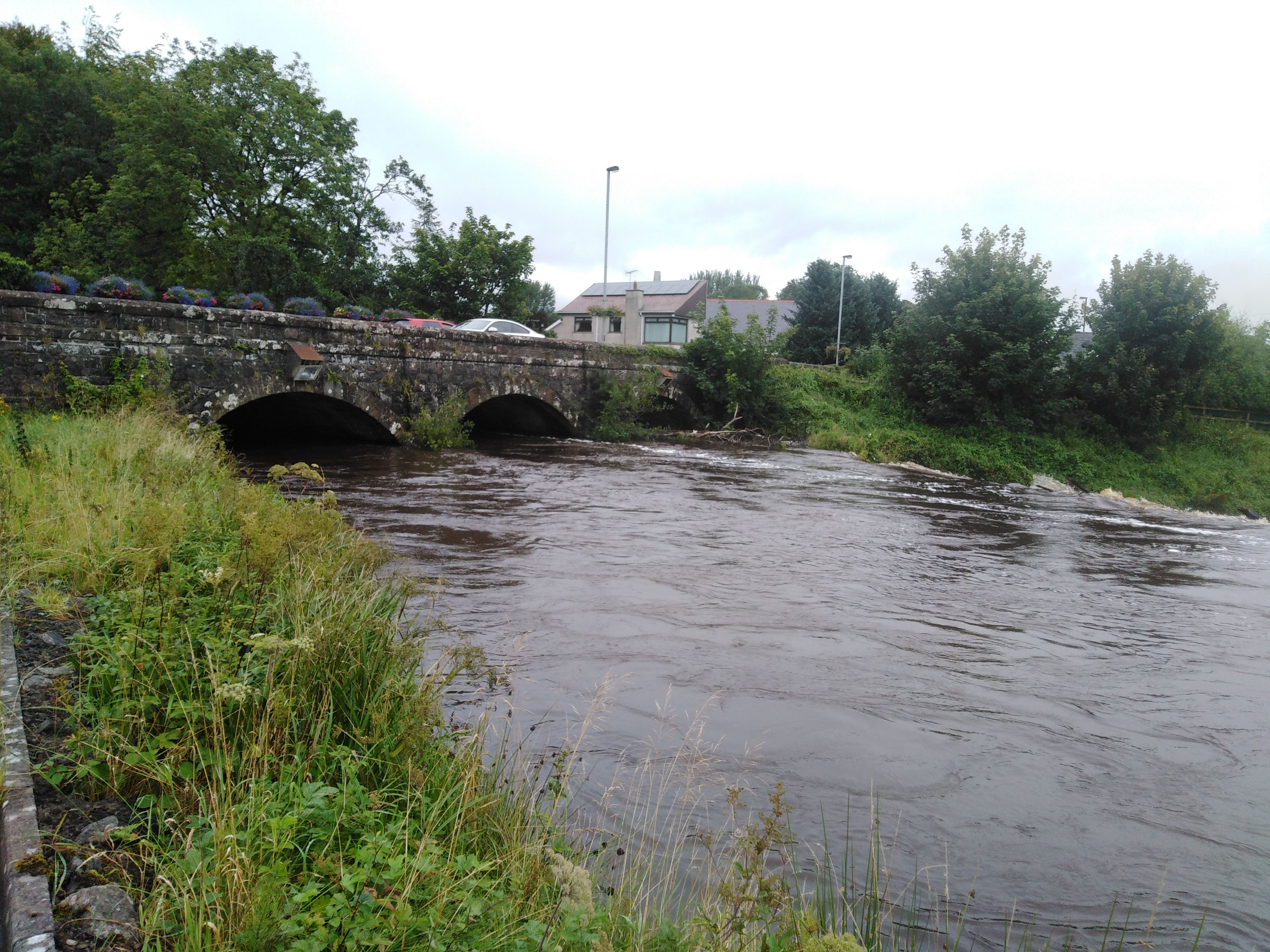
Ballynameen Bridge

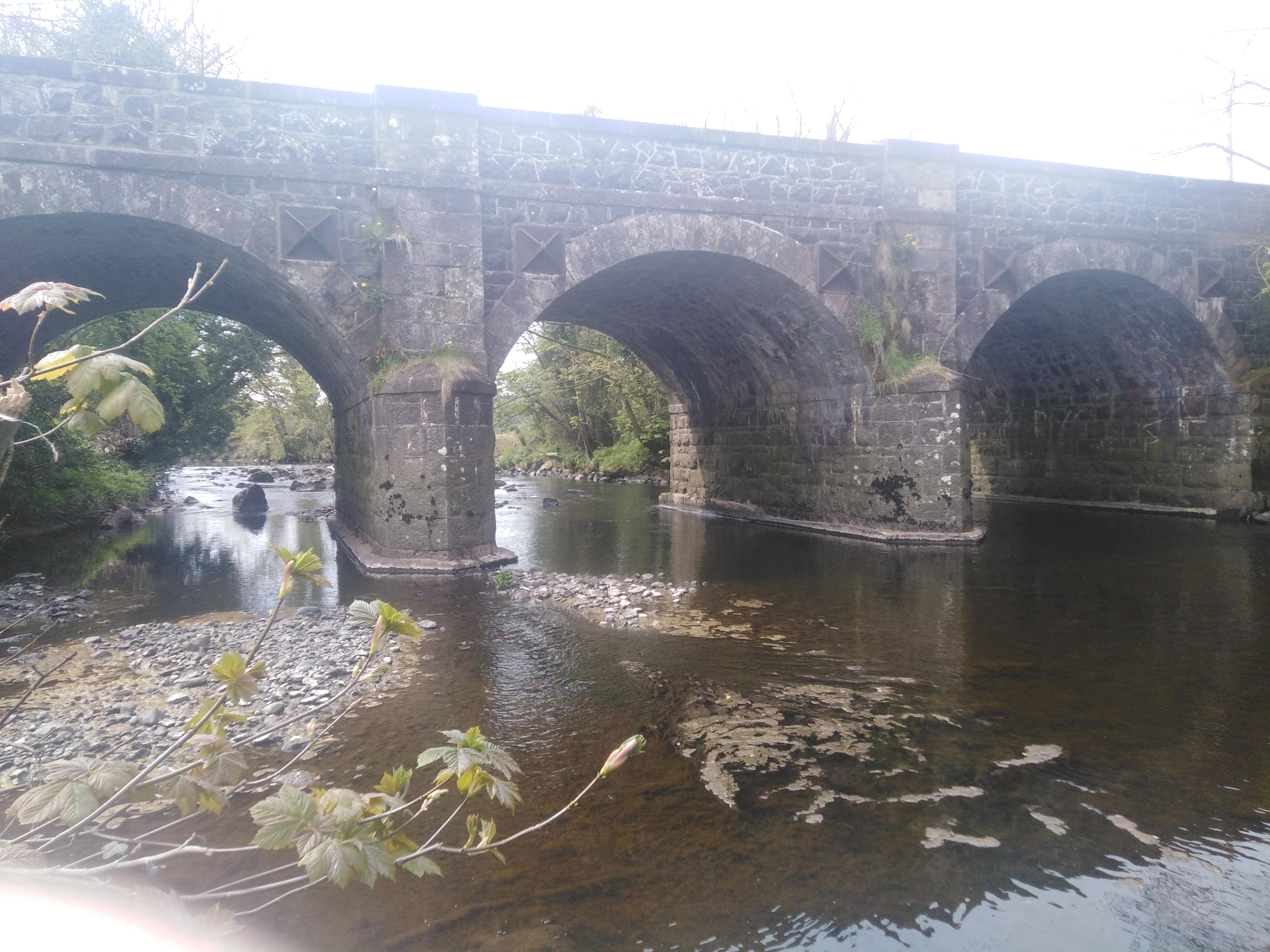
Moneycarrie Bridge

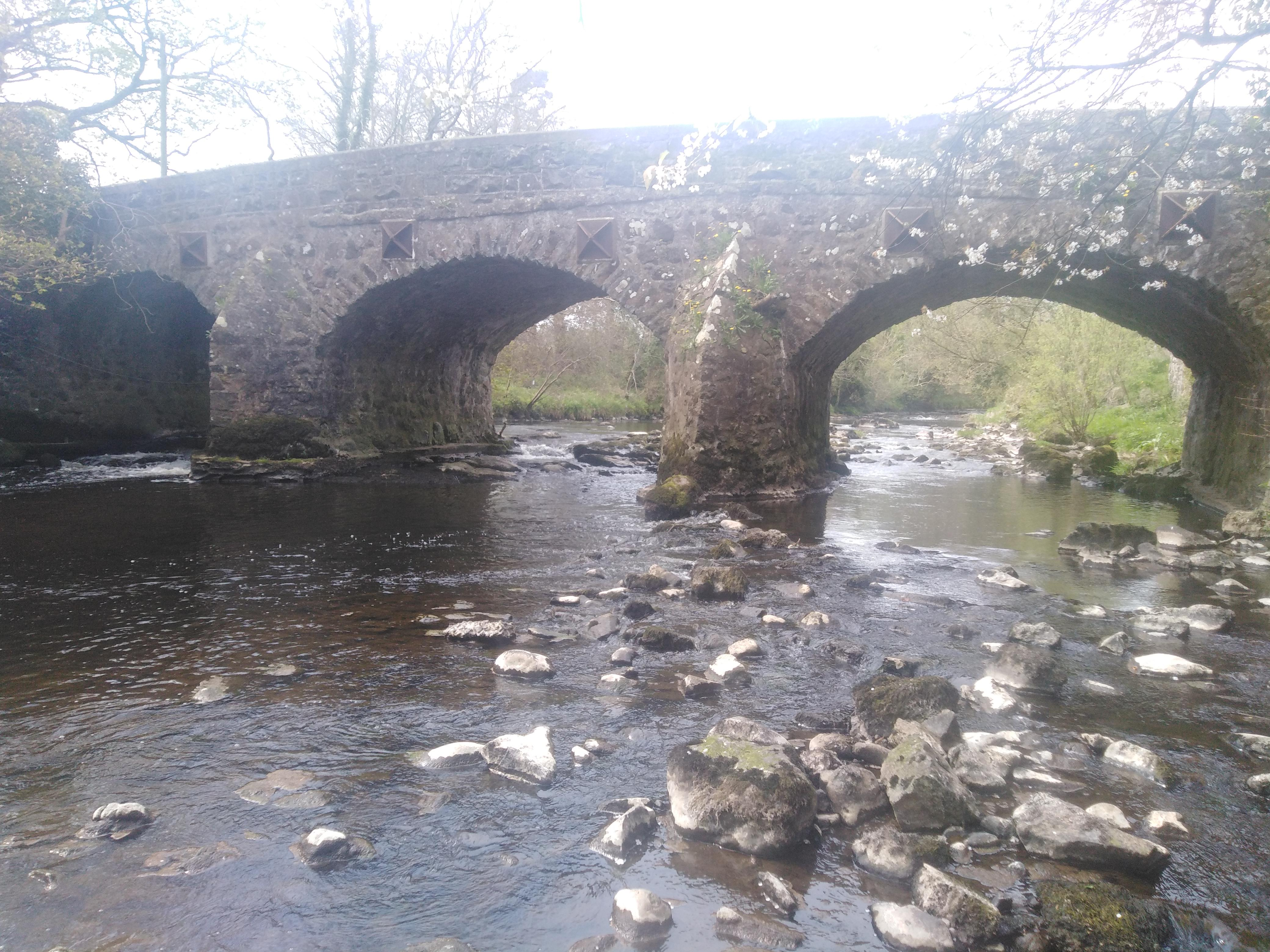
Bovagh Bridge

It has a medium-sized tributary the Aghadowey River also referred to as the Wee Agivey River which starts in Boleran and flows eastwards through Aghadowey. It joins the main Agivey upstream from Glasgort Bridge.

The Bridges of the Agivey River are

Upper River

Lisnascreahog Bridge, Brockagh Bridge, Errigal Bridge, The Ford Footstick

Middle River

Green Bridge, Ballynameen Bridge, Killyvalley Bridge, Railway Bridge, Moneycarrie Bridge

Lower River

Bovagh Bridge, Cullycapple Bridge, Brickhill Bridge, Glasgort Bridge.
