= Coleraine Bridge =

Bridge in Northern Ireland

Coleraine Bridge Bann Bridge
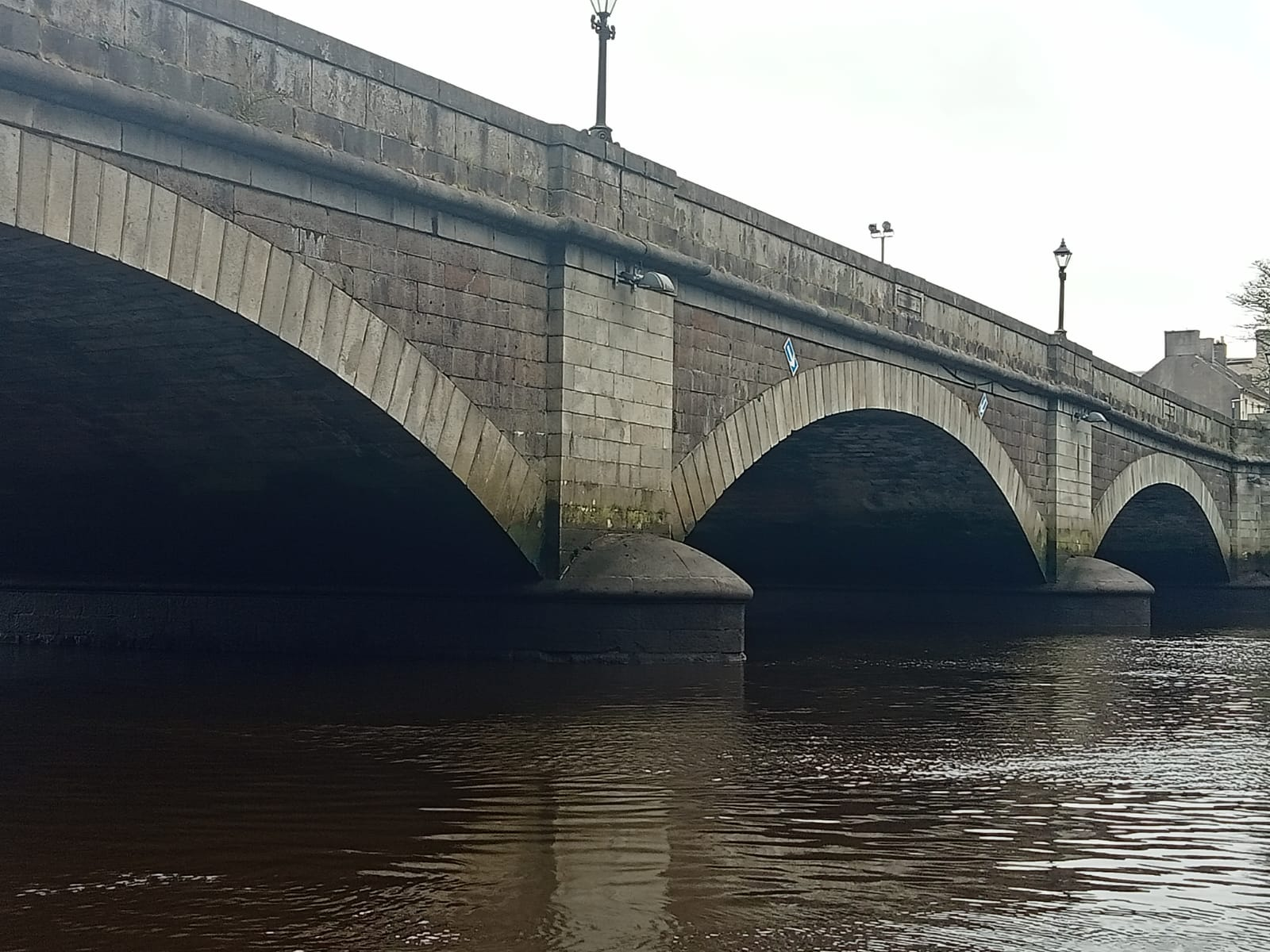
- Coleraine Bridge over the River Bann, viewed from upstream on the west bank
- Coordinates: 55°07′54″N 6°40′30″W
- Crosses: River Bann
- Locale: Coleraine, Northern Ireland
- Heritage status: Listed building (Northern Ireland)
- Preceded by: Sandelford Bridge
- Followed by: Bann Bridge

Characteristics
- Design: Triple-span masonry arch bridge
- Material: Ashlar granite, sandstone soffits

History
- Designer: Stewart Gordon
- Opened: 1844

Location
- Interactive map of Coleraine Bridge

Coleraine Bridge, also known as Bann Bridge, Town Bridge or the Old Bridge and sometimes the Old Bann Bridge, is a nineteenth-century masonry road bridge spanning the River Bann (Lower Bann) in Coleraine, Northern Ireland. Opened in 1844, the bridge is the most recent in a succession of crossings built at this location. It is a Grade A listed structure.

== Description ==
Coleraine Bridge is a triple-span masonry bridge carrying the main road across the River Bann. With the exception of the soffits, the structure is constructed of ashlar granite imported from Scotland. The soffits of the arches are of dressed sandstone, distinguished by their lighter colour.

The bridge comprises three equi-sized shallow segmental arches with vee-jointed voussoirs. Advanced abutments and piers incorporate cutwaters rising to spring level on both the upstream and downstream sides. Moulded string courses run through the arches at spring level and around the tops of the piers, with an additional moulded string course forming the base of the parapets.

The parapets project slightly above each pier and terminate in out-projecting terminal piers. Raised and fielded rectangular panels are located above each arch crown on the outer faces of the parapets. All are blank except those above the central arch: the downstream panel bears the inscription "Designed by Stewart Gordon C.E.", while the upstream panel reads "Erected by the County 1844".

Cast-iron lamp standards, now electrified, are positioned along each parapet above the abutments and piers. The deck carries two lanes of vehicular traffic with footpaths on both sides.

The central arch forms the navigable span of the bridge and provides an air draft of approximately 1.5 metres at high tide and 4.2 metres at low tide.

== Setting ==
Small public parks are located at both the south-east and south-west ends of the bridge. On the west bank, immediately upstream of the bridge, is Christie Park. On the town side of the river, the upstream park is Hanover Gardens. Directly upstream of Hanover Gardens is Bann Rowing Club, which was founded in 1842, two years before the opening of the current bridge.

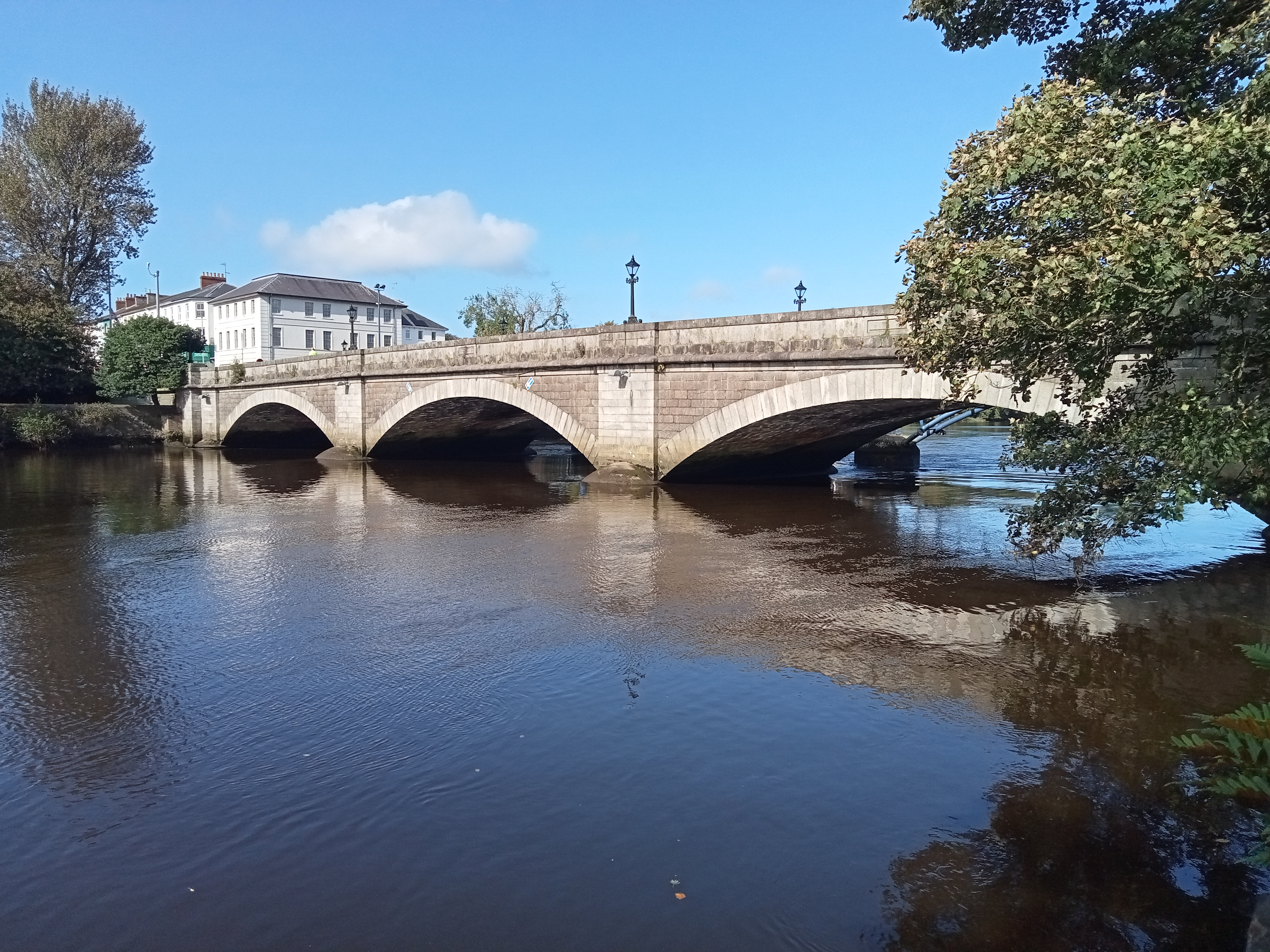
Coleraine Bridge viewed from Hanover Gardens

Immediately downstream of the bridge is the Millennium Footbridge, which opened in 2001. To the north-west lies a modern mooring pontoon operated by the Coleraine Harbour Commissioners, as well as the Clothworkers' Building. The north-east approach borders redeveloped land formerly occupied by Coleraine Harbour.

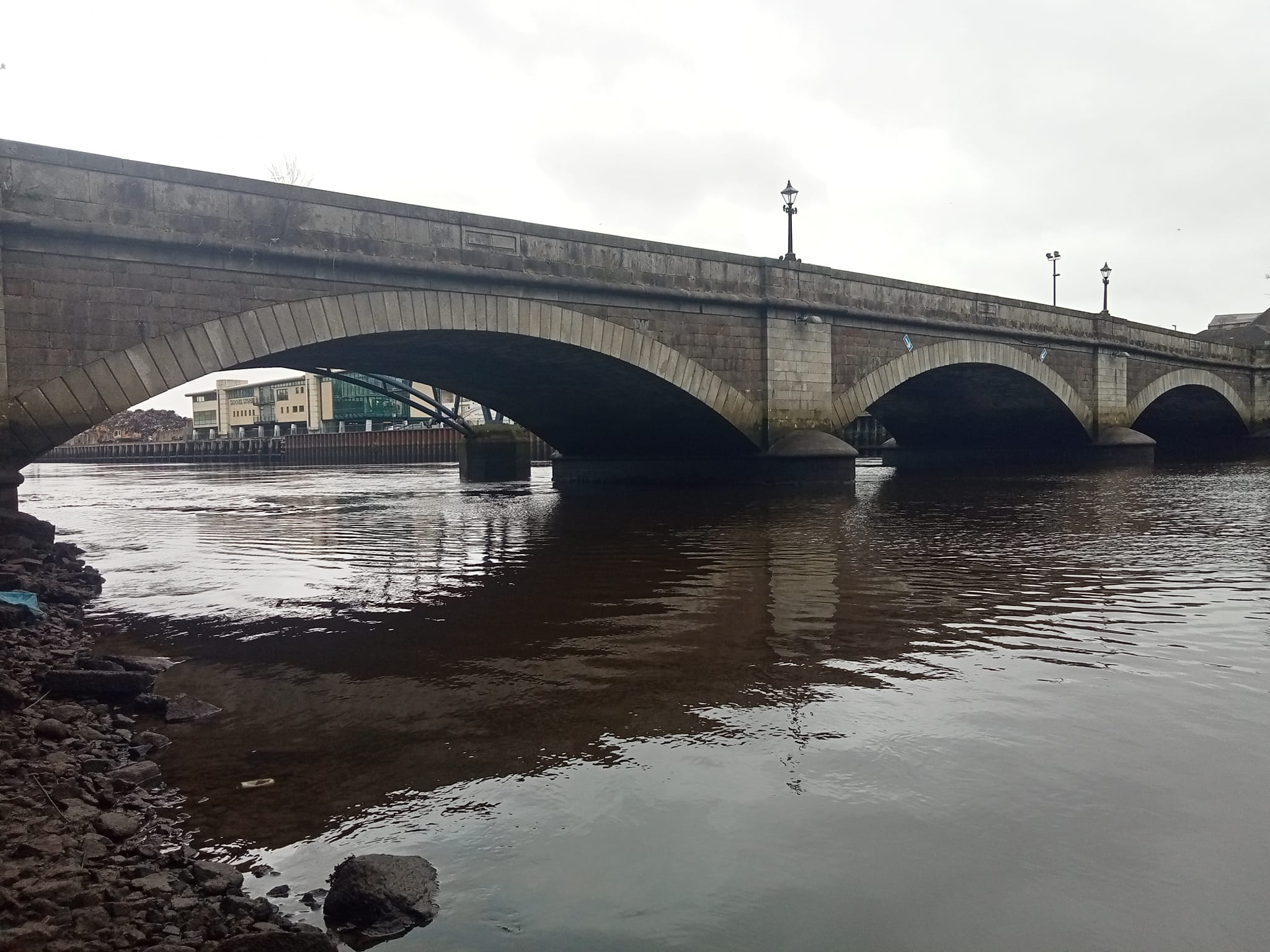
Coleraine Bridge at low tide

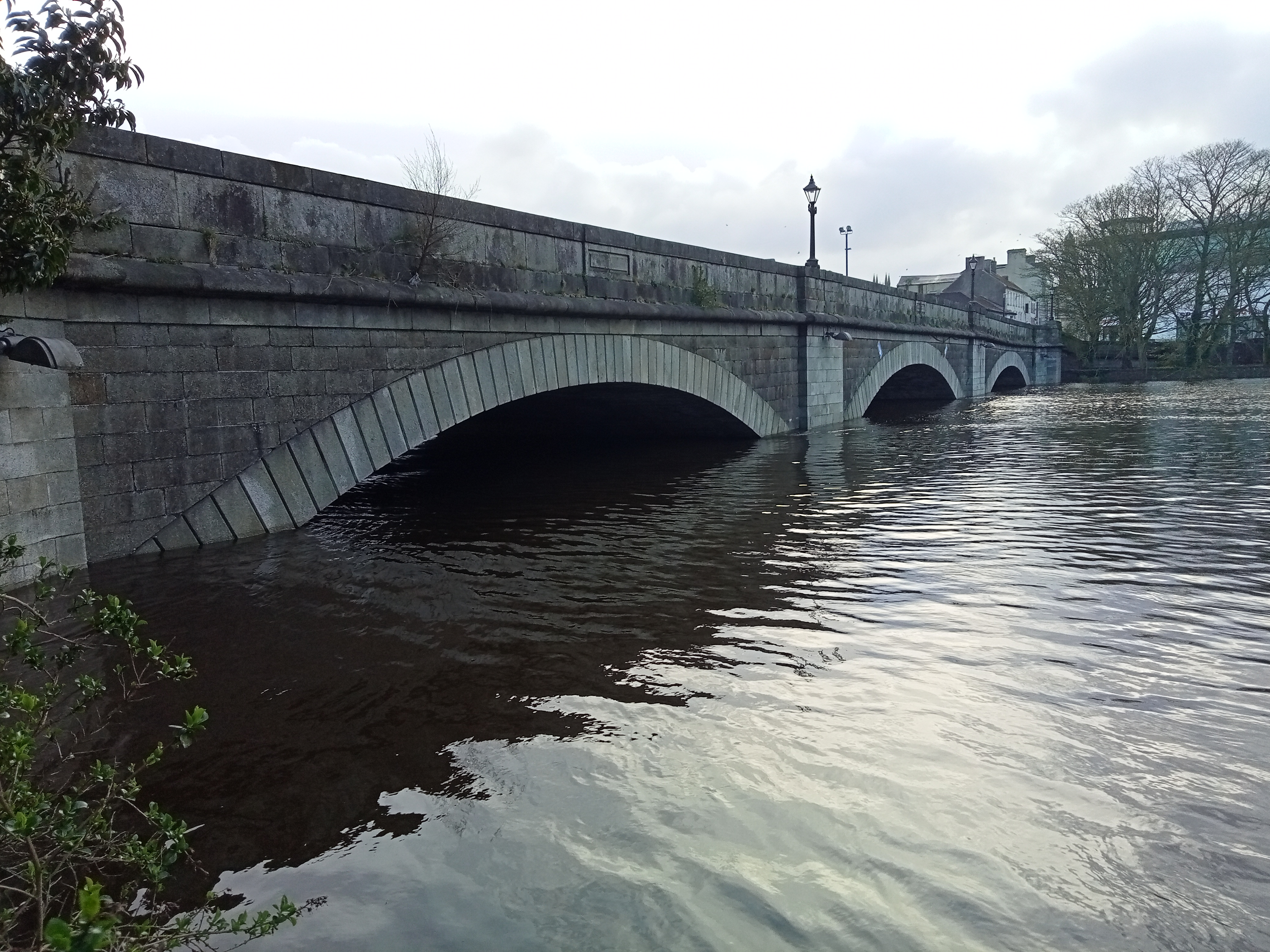
Coleraine Bridge at spring tide

== History ==
The crossing at Coleraine has existed since at least the thirteenth century. The earliest recorded bridge at the site was constructed in 1248 by John de Courcy in the vicinity of Coleraine Castle. Raven's map of 1620 depicts a timber bridge at the location.

A bridge erected in 1716 collapsed in 1739. A more substantial replacement was constructed by William Etheridge around 1743 with funding from the Irish Society. This structure is shown on Taylor and Skinner's 1783 map and is shown on early nineteenth-century Ordnance Survey maps.

The present bridge was completed in 1844 at a cost of £14,650, funded by the County Londonderry Grand Jury. It was designed by Stewart Gordon, County Surveyor for County Londonderry between 1834 and 1860, and constructed by John Lynn, a Coleraine-based contractor.

During the Second World War, a demolition chamber was installed within the bridge to allow for its destruction in the event of invasion, though no visible traces remain today. Until the opening of Sandelford Bridge upstream in 1975, Coleraine Bridge was the only crossing of the River Bann in the Coleraine area. The next crossing upstream was the Agivey Bridge in Aghadowey.

== Administration and use ==
Until 2002, the bridge marked the boundary between the remits of Waterways Ireland upstream and the Coleraine Harbour Commissioners downstream. Subsequent administrative changes reduced the latter’s jurisdiction to the Millennium Footbridge.

The bridge remains in continuous use as a road crossing, carrying two lanes of the A2 and footpaths on both sides. Historically, it formed part of a major transport route connecting Coleraine with towns along the north coast. Coleraine's Millennium Footbridge opened in 2001, lies Immediately downstream.

== Architectural and historic significance ==
Coleraine Bridge is heritage listed for its architectural and historic interest. It is valued for its proportions, materials, ornamentation, and "high standard of execution", particularly the dressed stone soffits. Writing in 1980, W. A. McCutcheon describes it as "one of the finest bridges in the province [of Ulster]".

According to its Department for Communities heritage listing, the bridge is of historical interest as "the latest in a succession of bridges across the river at this point".

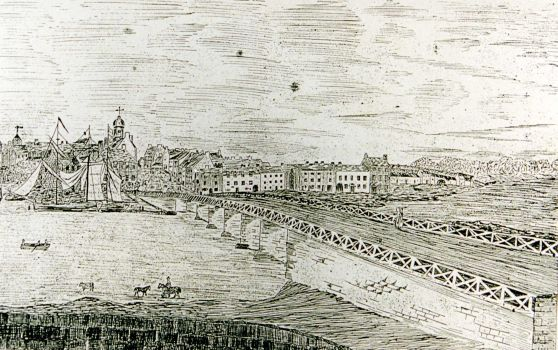
William Etheridges Coleraine Bridge

== Millenium Footbridge ==
A much more recent addition to the crossing is the Millenium Bridge also called the Waterside Footbridge which was built alongside the Coleraine Bridge to accommodate both a wider footpath and a cycle lane as the original bridge was deemed to narrow to have an A Class carriageway and 2 suitable footways on each side. This bridge was built in 2001 by Doran Consulting and funded partly by the Millennium Commission.

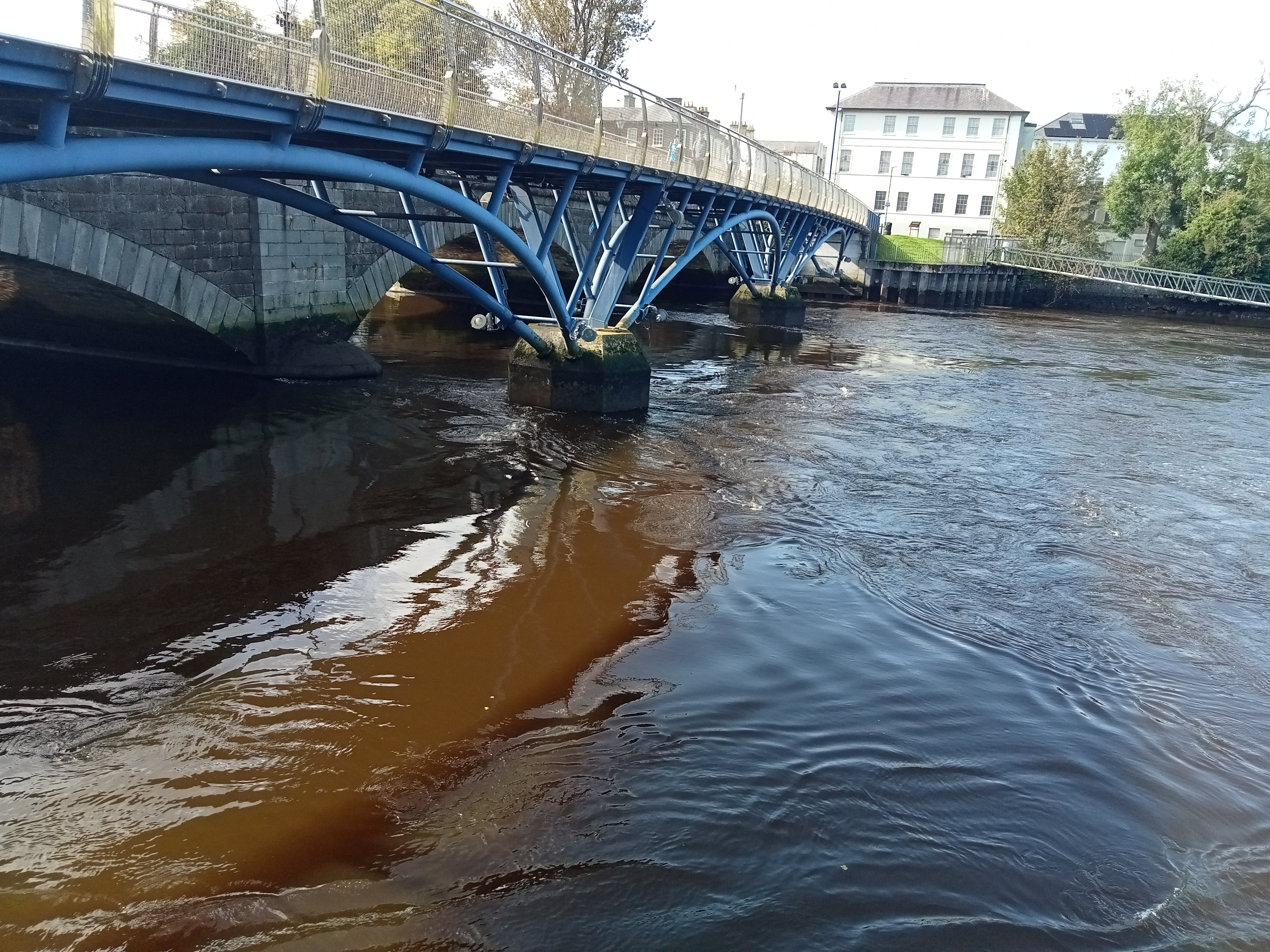
Millenium Bridge 2023
