= River Bann =

Longest river in Ulster, passing through Lough Neagh

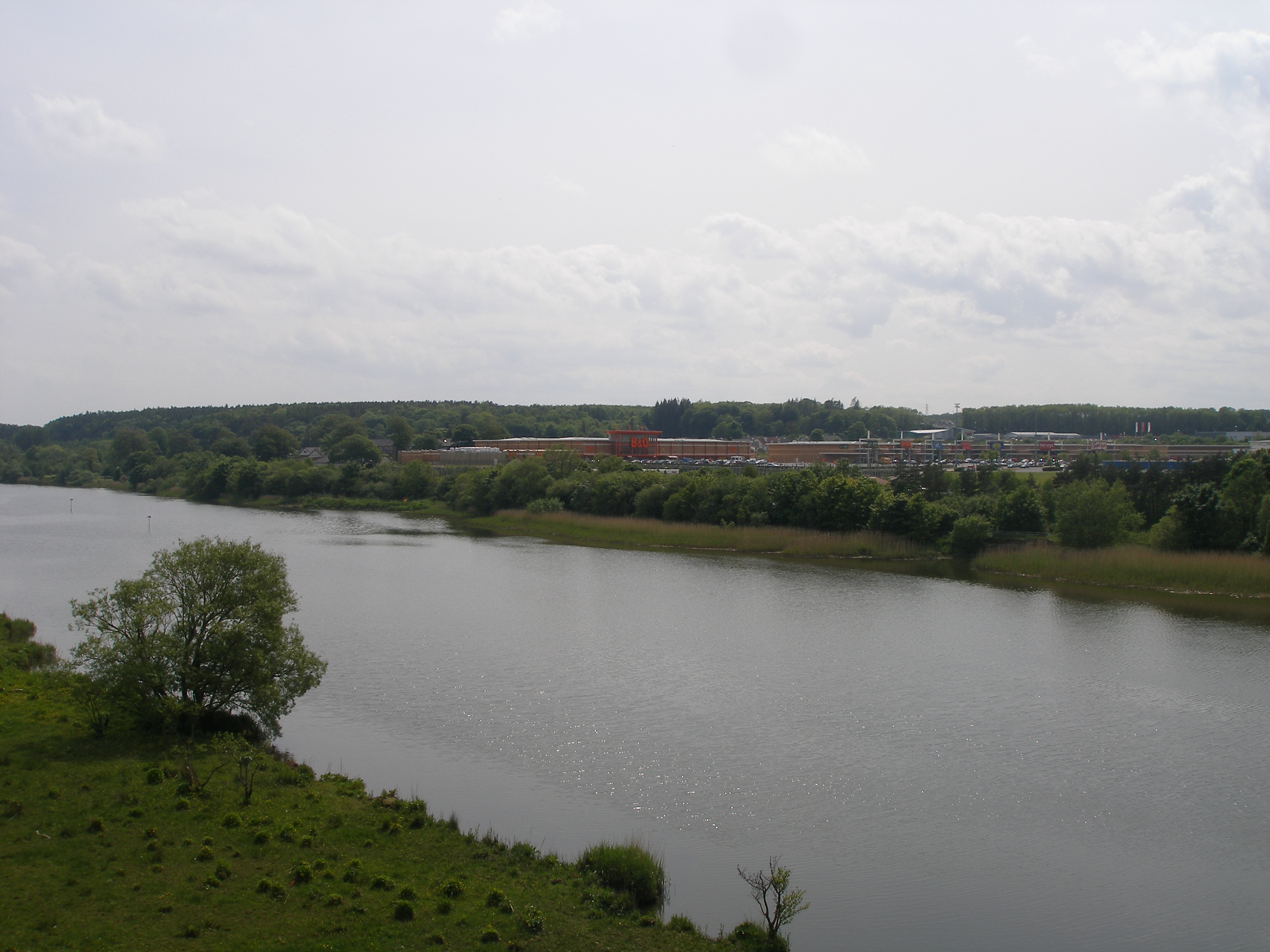
- Overlooking the Lower Bann from Sandelford Bridge at Coleraine and the Riverside Retail Park on the eastern banks of the river
- Native name: An Bhanna (Irish)

Location
- Sovereign state: United Kingdom
- Constituent country: Northern Ireland

Physical characteristics
- Source
  - location: Slieve Muck, County Down
- Mouth
  - location: Atlantic Ocean at Portstewart
  - coordinates: 55.17175°N 6.77264°W
- Length: 129 km (80 mi)
- Basin size: 5,775 km^{2} (2,230 sq mi)
- Discharge
  - average: 92 m^{3}/s (3,200 cu ft/s)

Basin features
- Tributaries
  - left: Ulster Blackwater Clady River, Agivey River, Rhee River, Articlave River
  - right: Ballymoney River

The River Bann (from Irish: An Bhanna, meaning "the goddess"; Ulster-Scots: Bann Wattèr) is the longest river in Northern Ireland, its length, Upper and Lower Bann combined, being 129 km (80 mi). The total length of the River Bann, including its path through the 30 km (19 mi) long Lough Neagh is 159 km (99 mi). Another length of the River Bann given is 90 mi. The river winds its way from the southeast corner of Ulster to the northwest coast, pausing in the middle to widen into Lough Neagh. The River Bann catchment has an area of 5,775 km^{2}. The River Bann has a mean discharge rate of 92 m^{3}/s. According to C. Michael Hogan, the Bann River Valley is a settlement area for some of the first human arrivals in Ireland after the most recent glacial retreat.

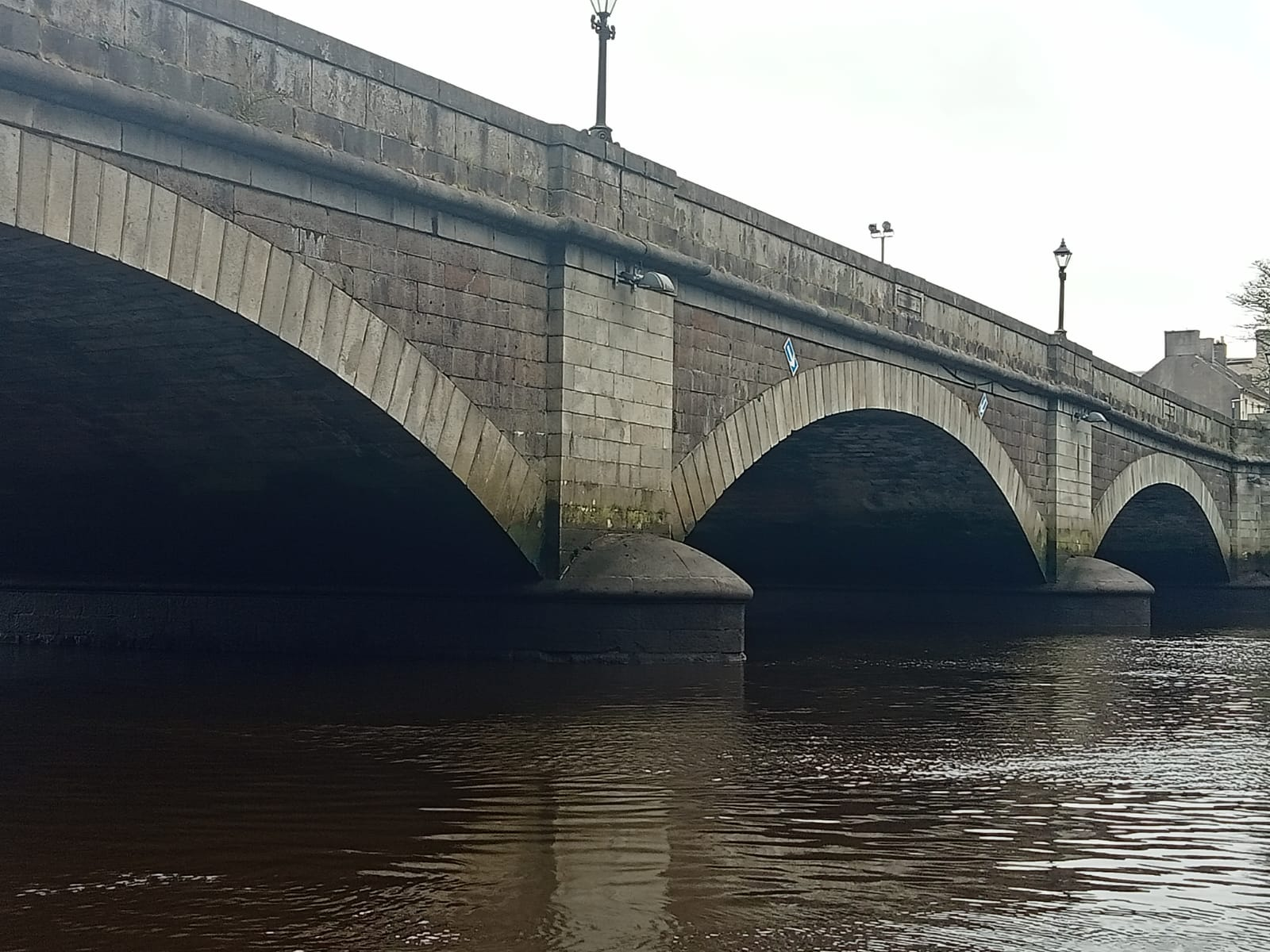
Stewart Gordons 1844 Coleraine Bridge at low tide

The river has played an important part in the industrialisation in Northern Ireland, especially in the linen industry. Today salmon and eel fisheries are the most important economic features of the river. The river is often used as a dividing line between the eastern and western areas of Northern Ireland, often labelled the "Bann divide". Towns, councils and businesses "west of the Bann" are often seen as having less investment and government spending than those to the east. It is also seen as a religious, economic and political divide, with Catholics and Irish nationalists being in the majority to the west, and Ulster Protestants and unionists in the majority to the east; and with the financial and industrial capital of Greater Belfast to the east with the west of the Bann being more agricultural and rural.

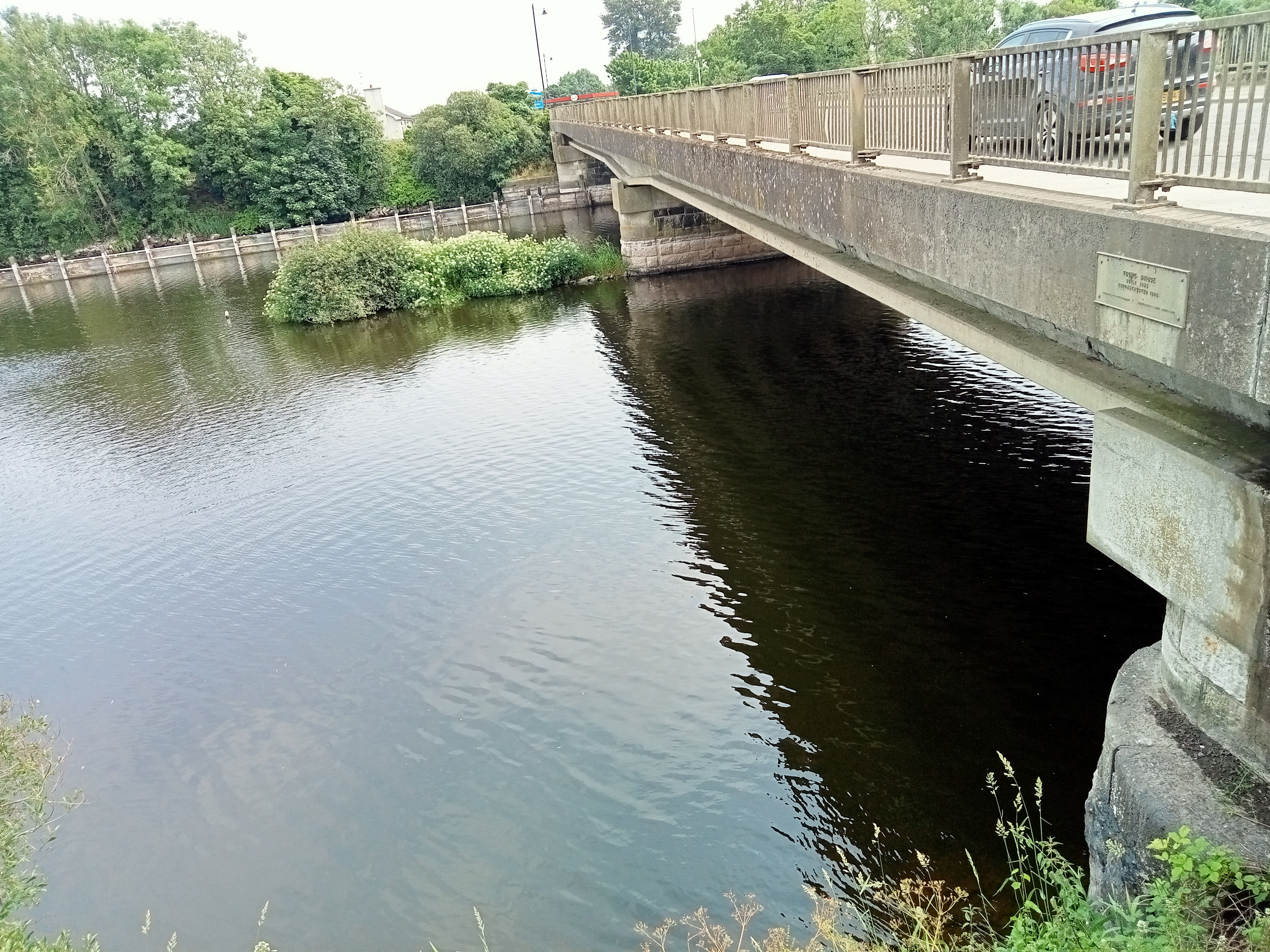
Toome Bridge Toomebridge first bridge on the Lower Bann built in 1968.

The Lough Neagh catchment drains 43% of the landmass of Northern Ireland, as well as some border areas in the Republic of Ireland, all in Ulster. The Rivers Agency manages the water level in the lough using a barrage at Toome. The current drainage scheme was engineered by Major Percy Shepherd and was enabled by the Lough Neagh and Lower Bann Drainage and Navigation Act (Northern Ireland) 1955. The levels are regulated between 12.45 metres and 12.6 metres above Ordnance Datum, as defined in the Lough Neagh (Levels) Scheme 1955 (SR&O(NI) 1955/179) (as amended).

== Upper Bann ==
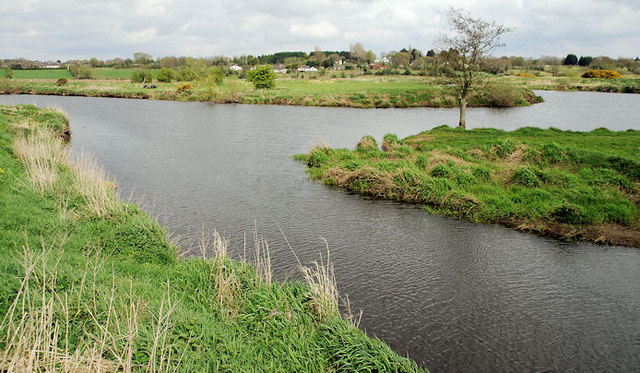
The point of Whitecoat, where the Newry Canal (in the foreground) meets the Upper River Bann

The Upper Bann rises at Slieve Muck in the Mourne Mountains, County Down and flows directly into Spelga Reservoir before continuing through a number of towns until after 64 kilometres (40 mi) it joins Lough Neagh at Bannfoot, County Armagh. This stretch is one of the most popular coarse fishing rivers in Europe. At Whitecoat Point near Portadown, it is joined by the Cusher River and connects with the now disused Newry Canal, which once gave access south to the Irish Sea.

Although the Upper Bann was officially abandoned as a navigation in 1954, it is still possible to navigate between Whitecoat Point and Lough Neagh. Entrance to the river from Lough Neagh is not easy, as the river is quite shallow at this point, and there are no navigation markers to assist. Once on the river, the jetties for the Bann Ferry are soon reached. It is possible to moor there, to visit the villages of Columbkille to the west or Bannfoot to the east. Bannfoot was originally called Charlestown after its builder, Charles Brownlow, who built it around 1830. Some 6 miles (10 km) from the mouth, the river is crossed by the M1 motorway. The bridge is the lowest on the navigable section, with an air draught of around 10 feet (3 m), although in strong northerly winds, water backs up in the river and the headroom is reduced.

From the bridge it is around 3 miles (5 km) to Portadown, and the river passes through pleasant rural scenery. Exploration of the town from the river is difficult, because water levels at Shillington Quay and at the jetty a little further upstream are very shallow. The river is crossed by the railway line from Portadown to Lurgan and then road bridges carrying the A3 road and the A27 road. The junction with the Cusher River and the entrance to the derelict Newry Canal is just over 1 mile (1.6 km) from the final bridge, and navigation of the river is possible for a short distance beyond that point.

== Upper Bann bridges ==
The bridges over the Upper Bann are:

- Spelga Bridge
- B27 New Bridge
- B8 Eight Mile Bridge
- Mill Bridge
- Cavan Bridge
- A25 McCombs Bridge
- Bannfield Bridge
- Tirkelly Bridge
- Roughan Bridge (1839)
- Seafin Bridge
- B25 Kates Bridge
- Circular Rd Bann Bridge
- Mulligans Bridge
- Balilievey Bridge
- Lisnaree Bridge
- Lindsays Bridge
- A1 Bypass Bridge
- A25 Banbridge Town Bridge
- Milltown Bridge
- Point Bridge
- Tullylish Bridge
- A51 Gilford Bridge
- White Bridge
- B2 Dynes Bridge
- A27 Portadown Bann Bridge (originally built 1838, widened 1922 and 2006)
- A3 Shillington Bridge (1970)
- Bann Railway Bridge
- M1 Bann Bridge (1967)

== Lower Bann ==
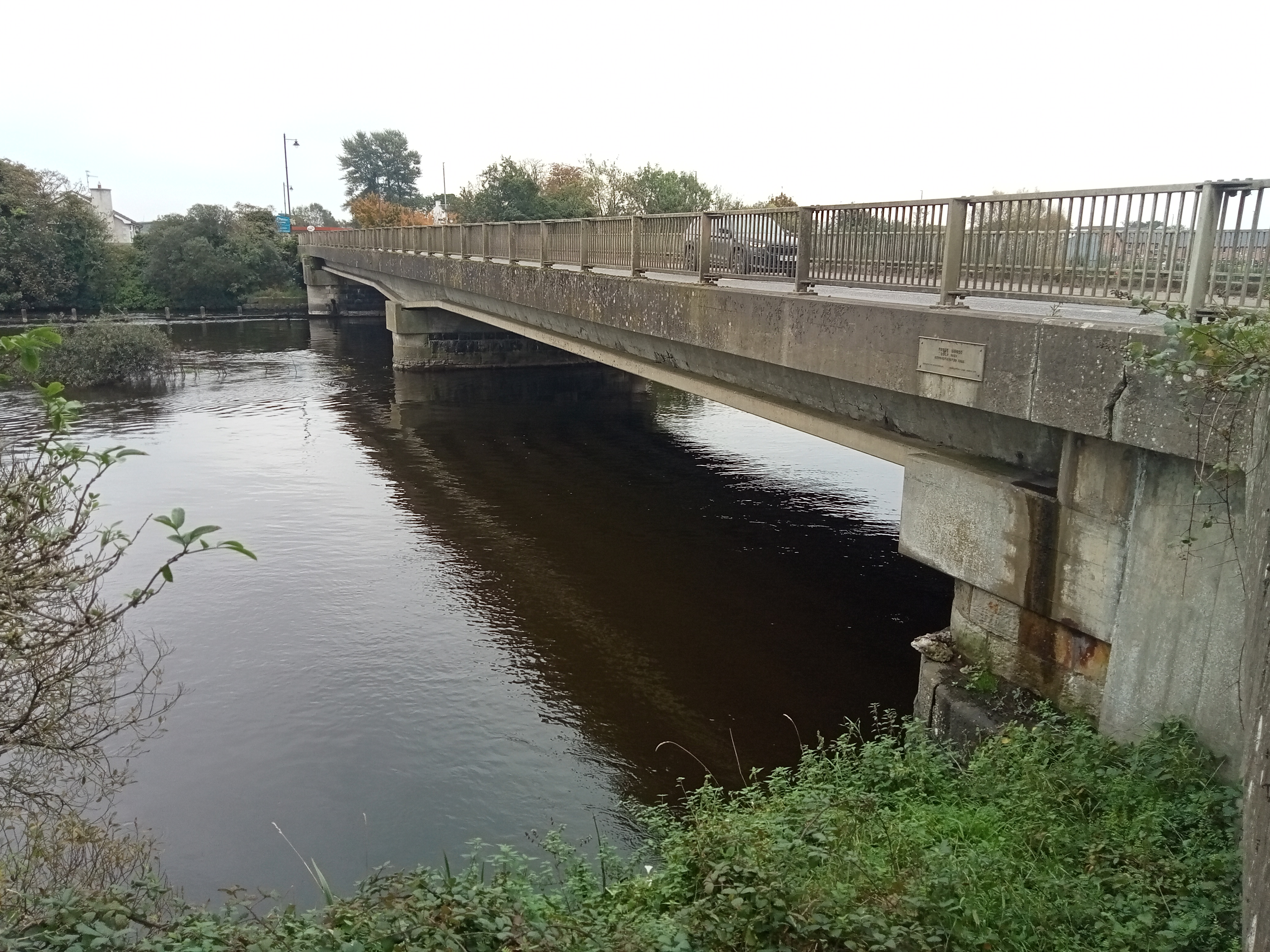
Old Toome Bridge

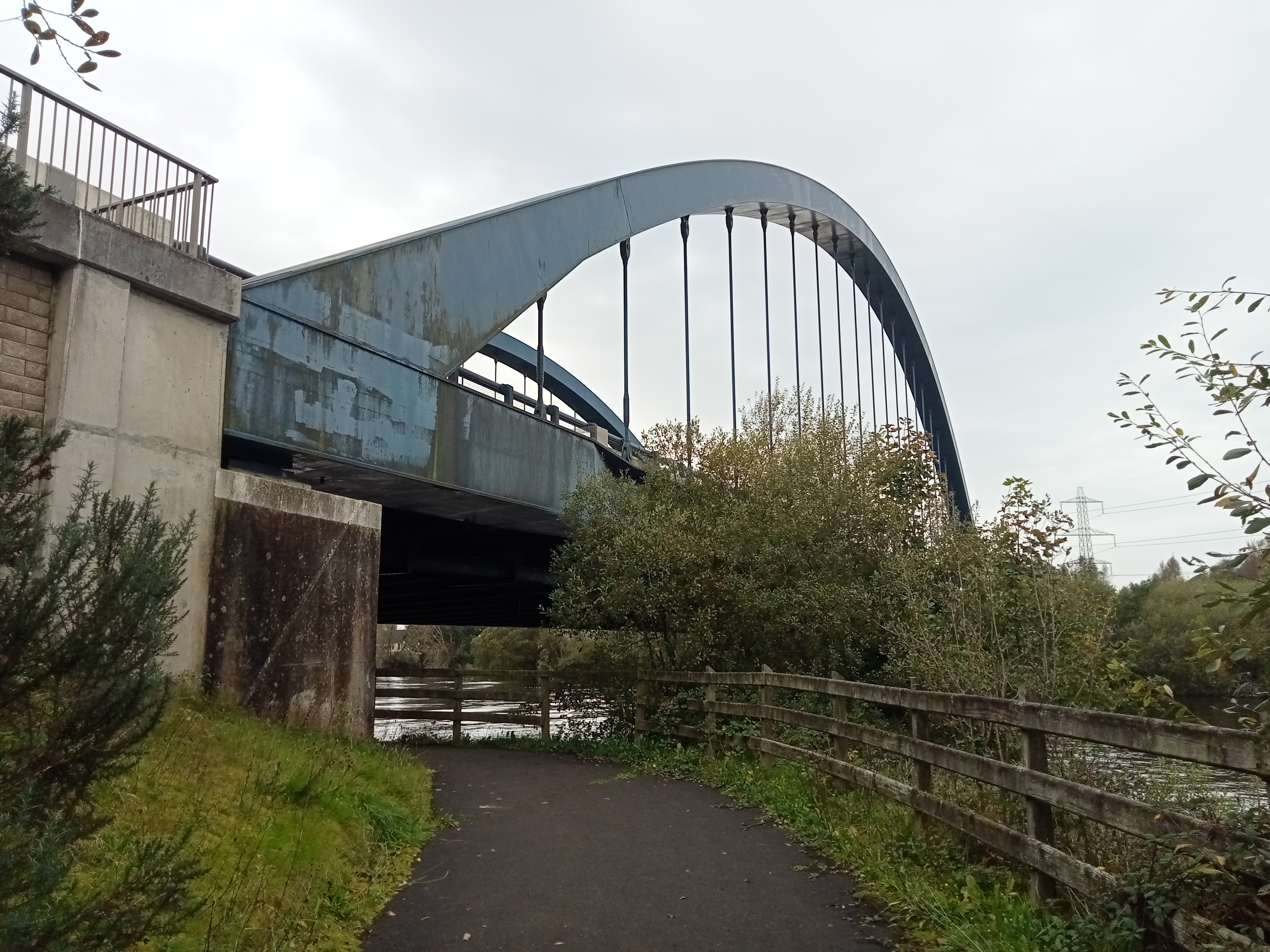
New Toome Bridge

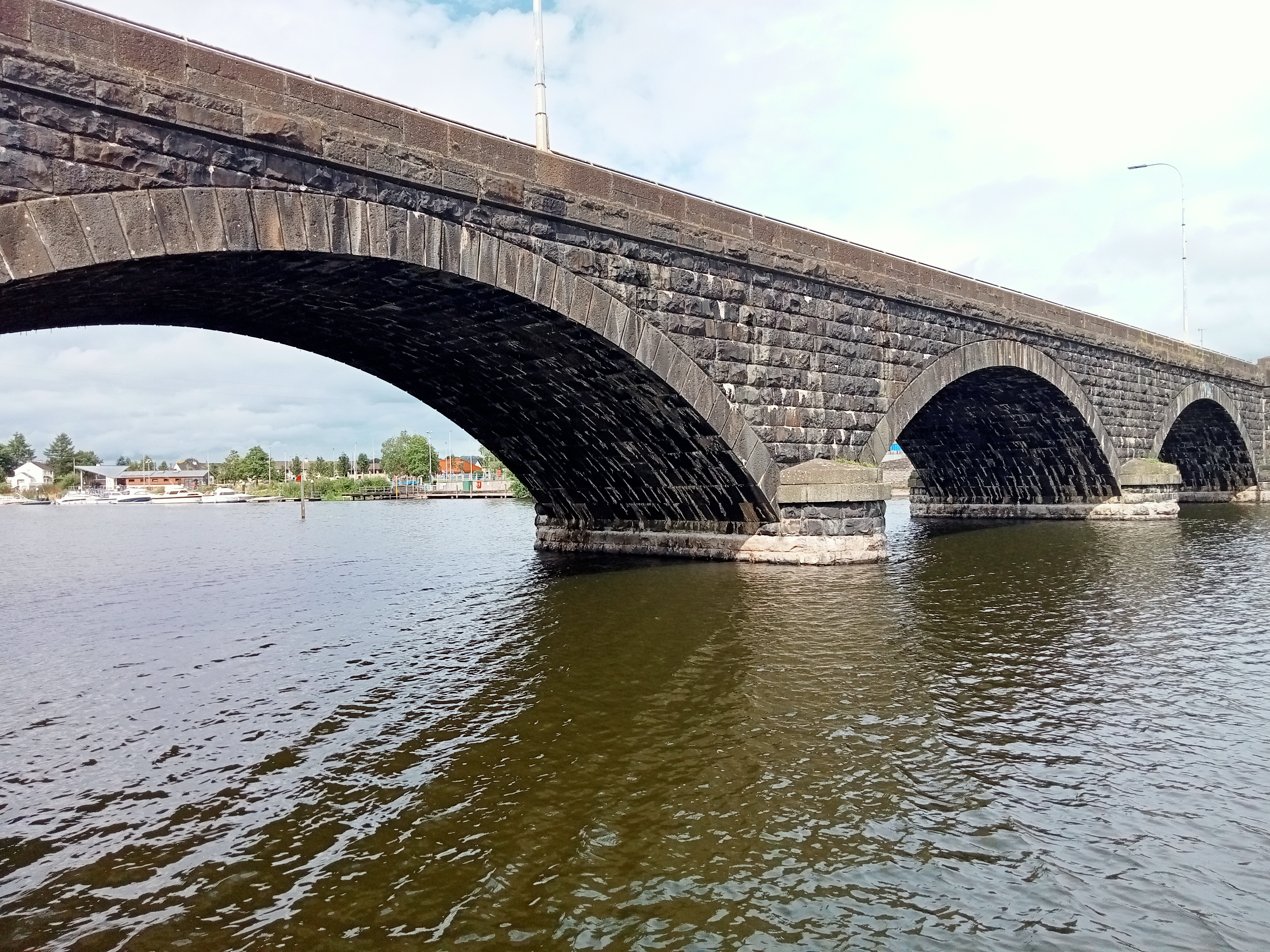
Portglenone Bridge

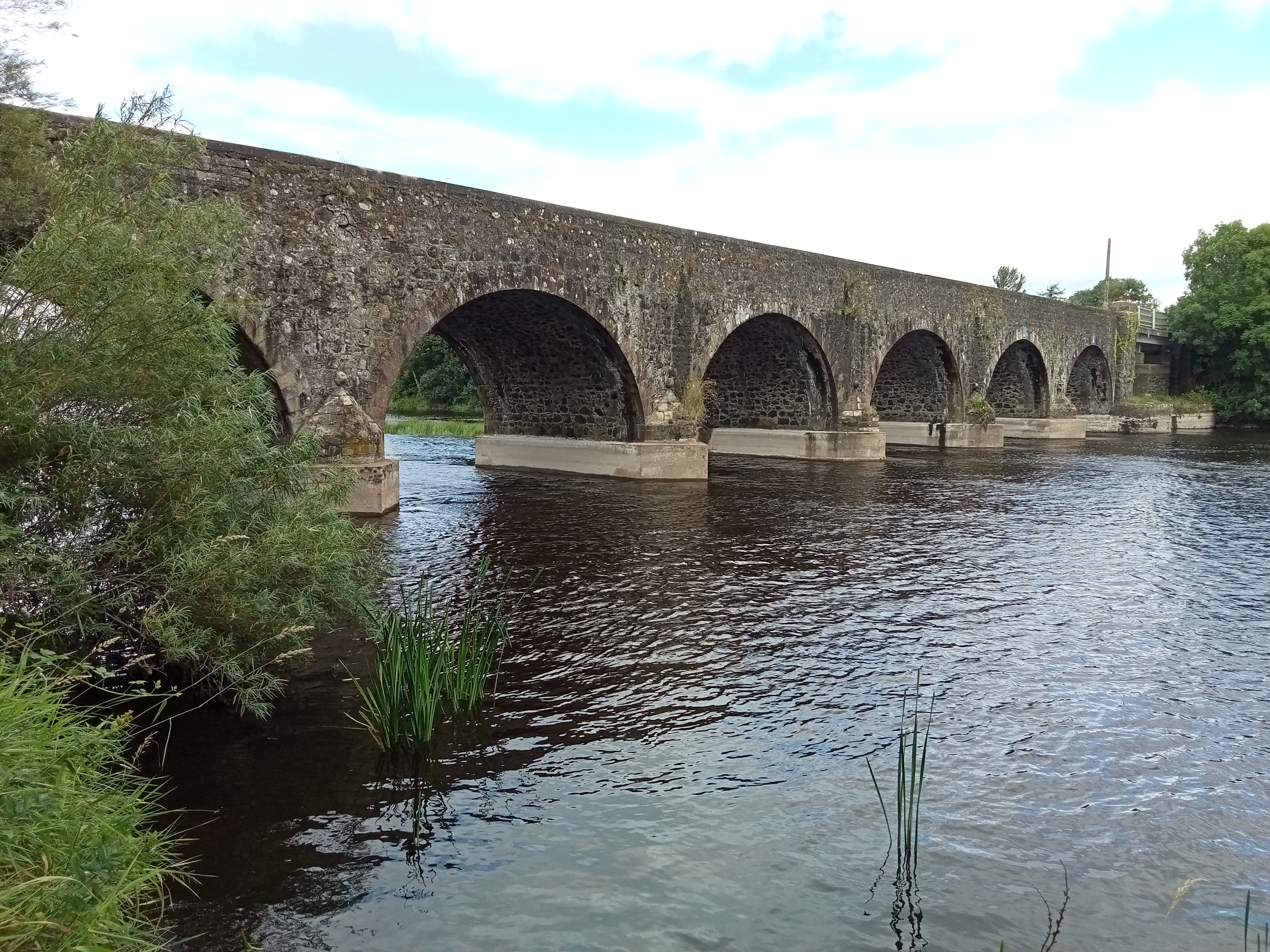
Kilrea Bridge

The Lower Bann flows from Lough Neagh at Toome to the Atlantic Ocean at Barmouth, located behind Portstewart Golf Club, between Portstewart and Castlerock. The Lower Bann is 64 kilometres (40 mi) long and is a canalised waterway, with five navigation locks, at Toome, Portna, Movanagher, Carnroe and Castleroe. The river is very popular with water sports enthusiasts, anglers and cruisers and has minimal commercial traffic. It acts as most of the border between County Antrim and County Londonderry. The only commercial port on the river is at Coleraine. Ships from Londonderry Port and the Port of Belfast transfer coal and scrap metal.

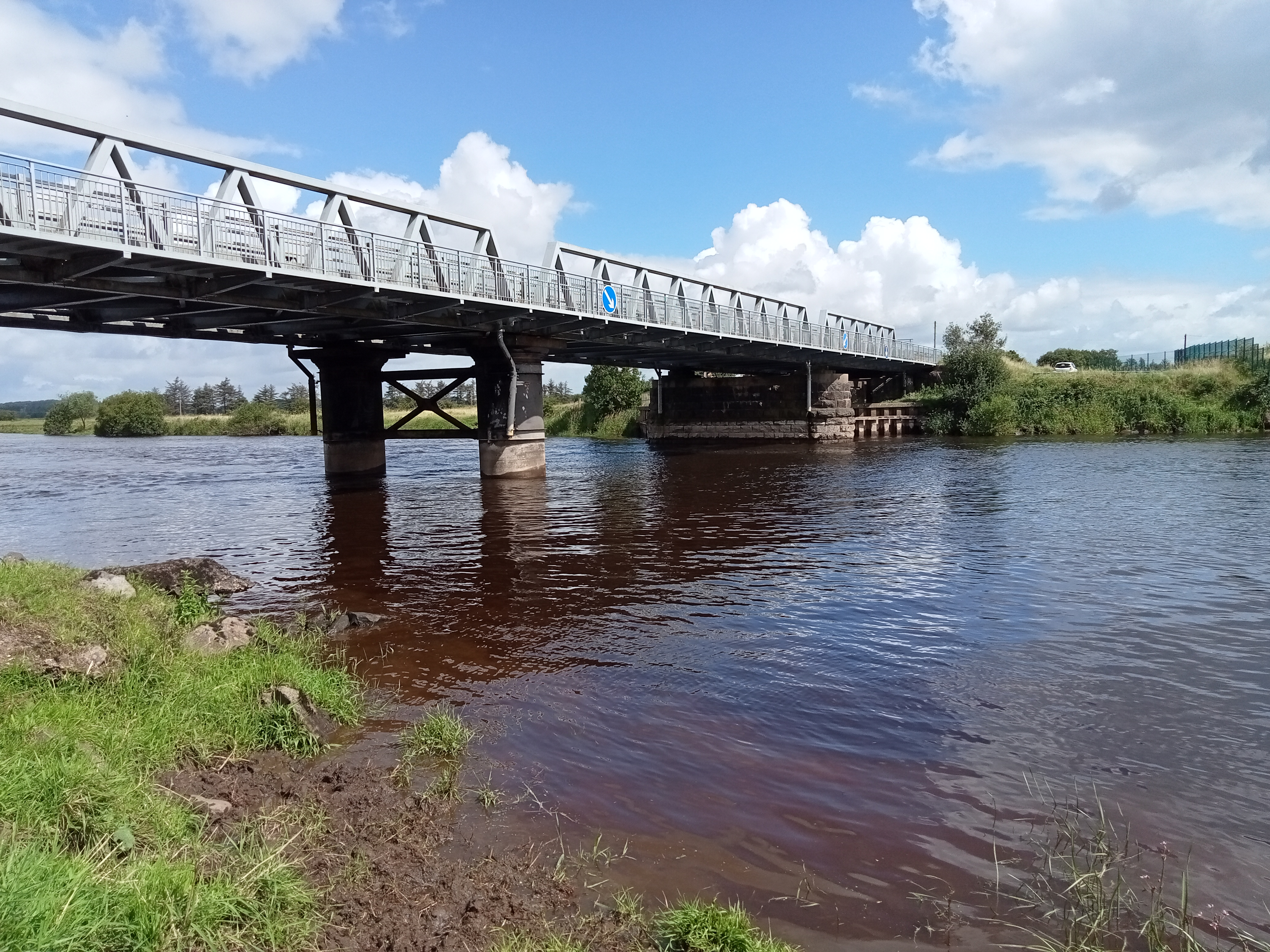
Agivey Bridge

The water level on the Lower Bann is controlled by the Rivers Agency using gates situated at Portna (near Kilrea) and The Cutts at Coleraine.

== Lower Bann tributaries ==
Major tributaries include the Clady River Inveroe Burn, Agivey River, Macosquin Rhee River, Ballymoney River and Articlave River.

== Lower Bann bridges ==
The bridges over the Lower Bann are:

- B18 Old Toome Bridge (1860s Old, 1968 New)
- A6 New Toome Bridge (2004)
- A42 Portglenone Bridge (1853)
- B64 Kilrea Bridge (1783)
- B66 Agivey Bridge (1859 Old, 1980 New)
- A29 Sandelford Bridge (1975)
- A2 Coleraine Bridge (1844)
- Millennium Waterside Footbridge (2001)
- Bann Bridge Railway Bridge (1924)

== History ==
Ptolemy's Geography (2nd century AD) described a river mouth called Αργιτα (Argita, "shining"), referring to the Bann.

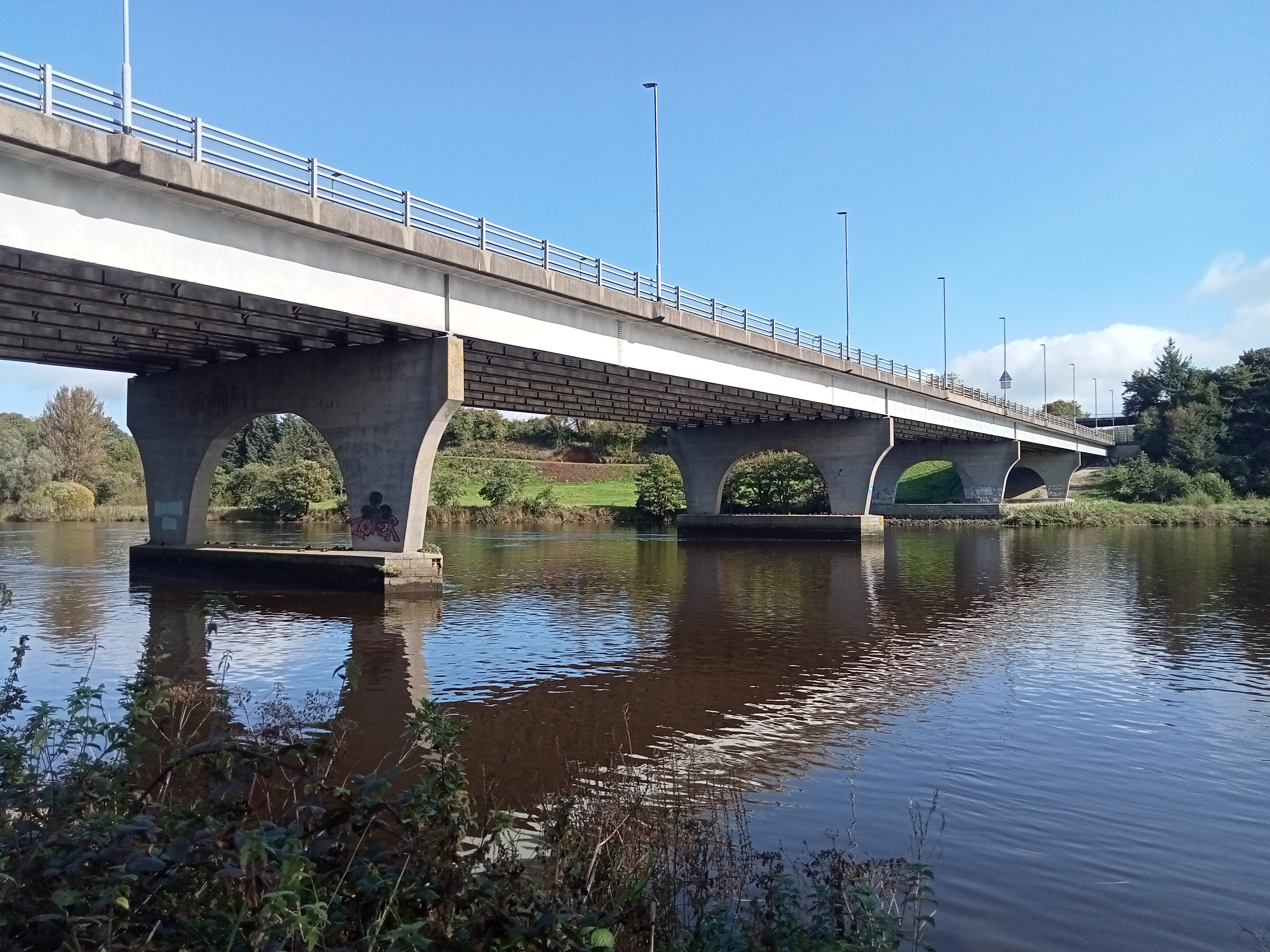
Sandelford Bridge

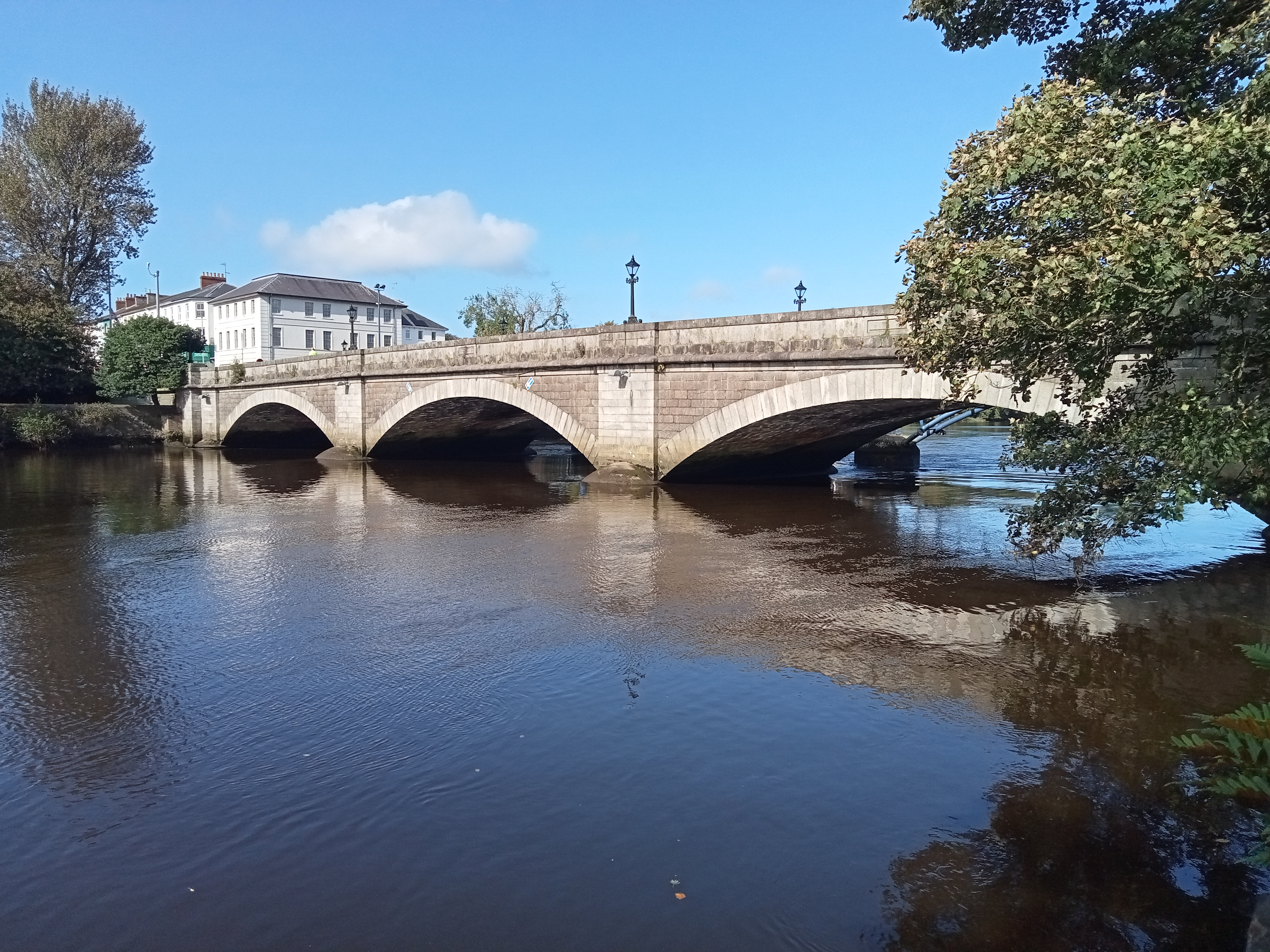
Coleraine Bridge

The Lower Bann provides the only outlet for Lough Neagh, the largest freshwater lake in the British Isles, which is fed by six major rivers, including the Upper Bann. The ability of the lough to absorb large quantities of flood water is limited, and consequently, the areas around the lough are prone to flooding.

The Lower Bann encountered a large shoal of rock at Portna, which reduced the effectiveness of the outflow, and in 1738, Francis Hutchinson, the Bishop of Down and Connor petitioned the Irish Parliament to do something about the shoals, and hence the annual flooding that affected his people. Although Parliament responded encouragingly, no actual work was done, and the problem remained. In 1822, the Scottish engineer Alexander Nimmo proposed a radical solution. The Newry Canal provided a route southwards from Lough Neagh to Carlingford Lough, but it rose to a summit and then descended again. His proposal was to lower the summit level so that it was below the level of Lough Neagh, remove all the locks, and so provide a second outlet to the sea. Not only would it solve the problems of flooding, but it would also solve the inadequate water supply for the canal, eliminate lock maintenance, and could generate around 2,200 kW as the water would still have to fall by 13.7 metres (45 ft). The plan was deemed a little too ambitious and failed to win support.

The Board of Works were authorised by the Drainage (Ireland) Act 1842 (5 & 6 Vict. c. 89) to carry out works in the Lough Neagh basin, which would improve navigation, drainage and milling. A series of public meetings were held, and a survey was made of the Lower Bann. The Board of Works then instructed their own engineer to carry out a survey. John McMahon estimated that it would cost £183,775 to improve the Lower Bann from Lough Neagh to the sea, and that the navigation works accounted for less than half of this, with the drainage works making up the rest. Removal of the Portna shoal would reduce the level of the lake surface by some 1.8 metres (6 ft). The plan was well received, and work began in 1847.

Charles Ottley acted as chief engineer but found difficulty in recruiting a labour force. The number of men looking for work had been reduced by famine and emigration, and the railways were competing for workers. The project took eleven years to complete. A double-chambered lock was constructed at Portna, where the shoal was removed, and four other locks were needed to negotiate the difference in levels. Quays and swing bridges were erected, and various alterations had to be made around Lough Neagh to cope with the drop in the surface level. The final lock on the Lagan Canal, the Coalisland Canal and the Ulster Canal had to be rebuilt with a lower cill and deeper lock gates, and the River Blackwater had to be made deeper and wider. The cost of the project overran by £50,000 and the government was asked to make up the shortfall. The Upper Bann Navigation included the River Bann between its junction with the Newry Canal at Whitecoat Point and Lough Neagh, a route across Lough Neagh to the mouth of the Blackwater, and the lower 10.5 miles (17 km) of the Blackwater as far as Blackwatertown.

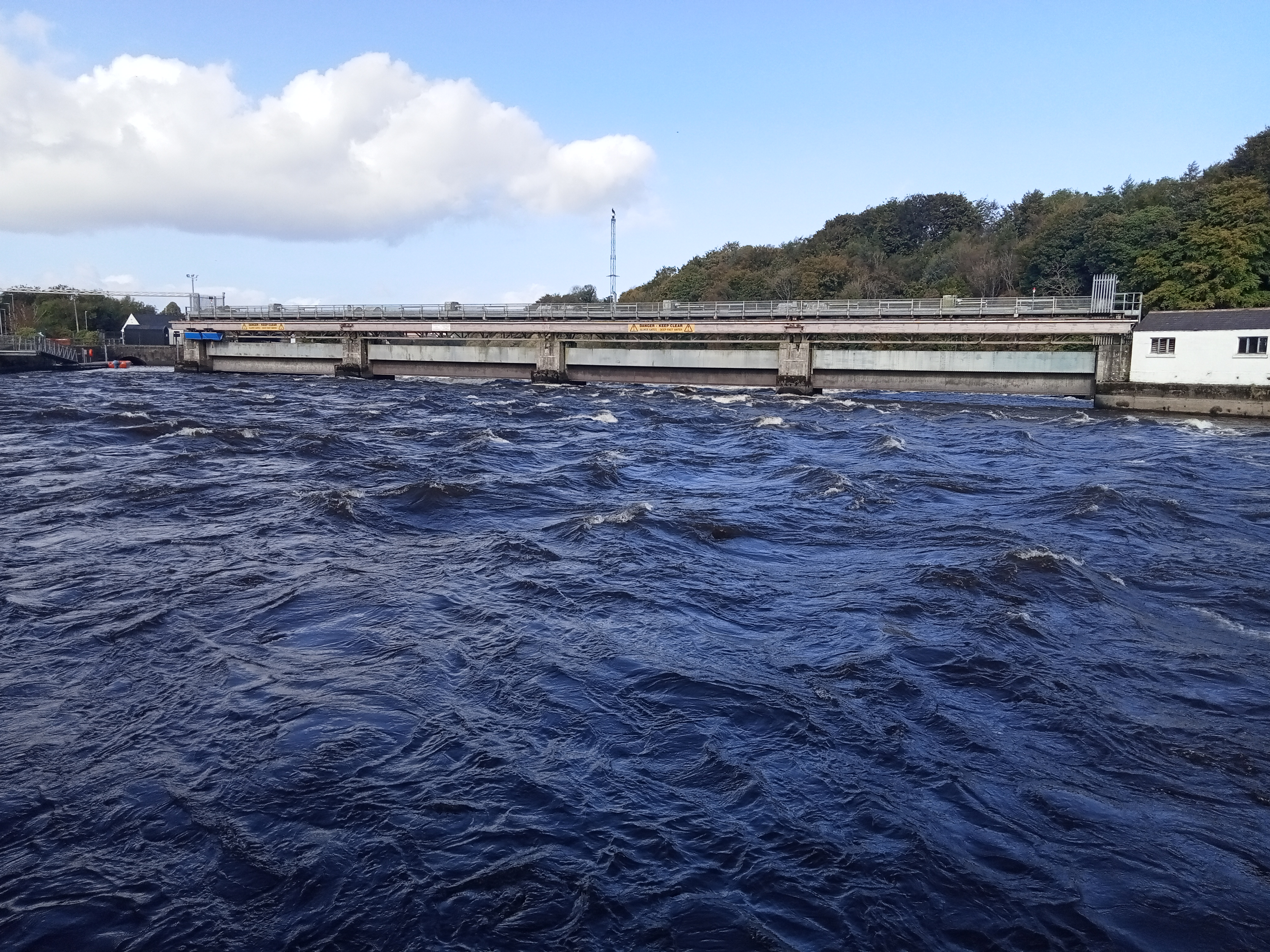
The River Bann at the Cutts Weir

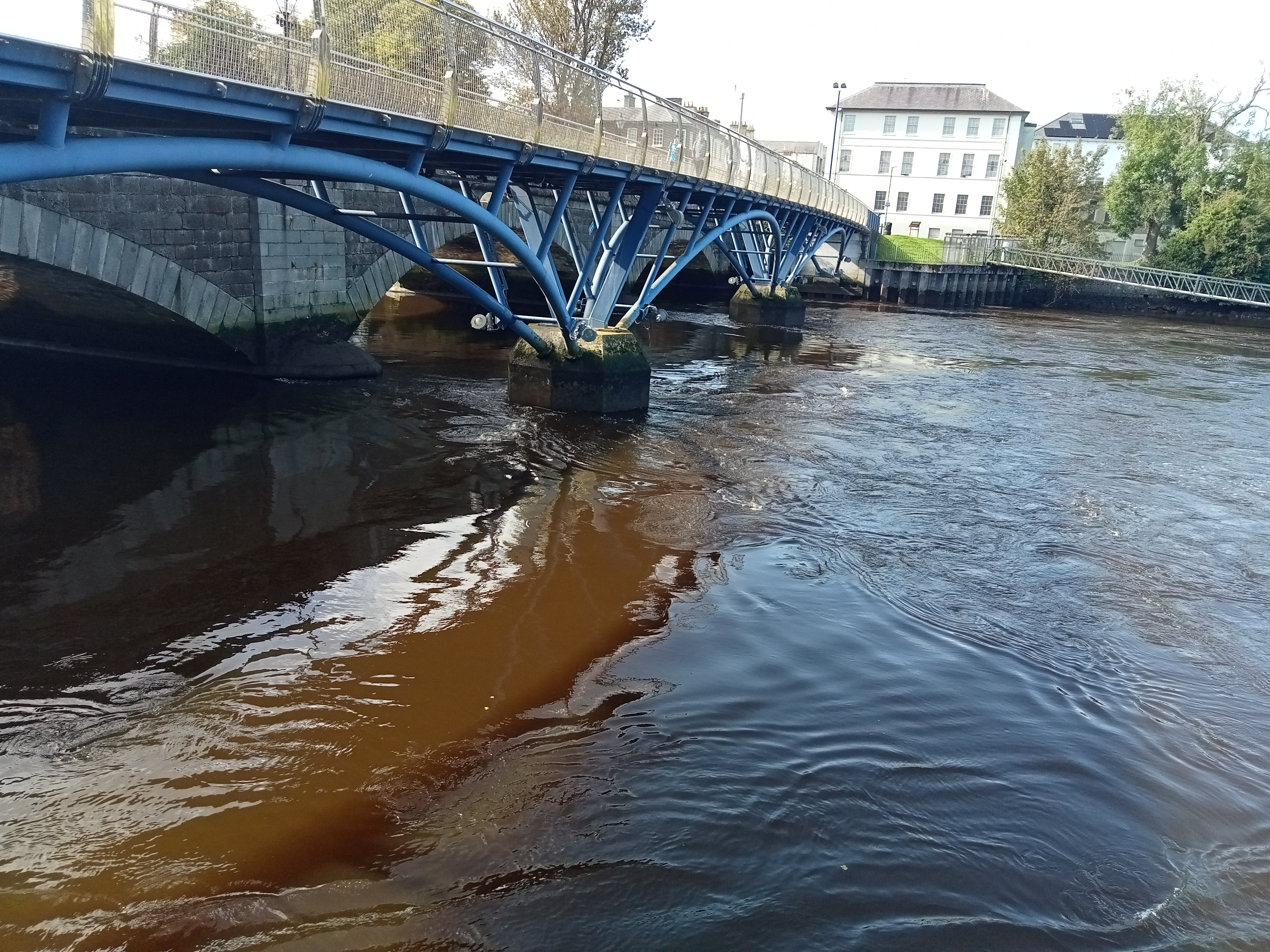
Millenium Bridge

This was one of four works of navigation part funded by the Treasury during the famine years in Ireland. The other three were the Ballinamore-Ballyconnell Canal linking Lough Erne to the river Shannon across County Leitrim; Loughs Corrib, Mask and Carra in counties Galway and Mayo; and Lough Oughter and Lough Gowna in County Cavan. The Upper Bann Navigation was the only one completed to its full design extent. The final award for this scheme was made on 13 April 1859. The finished scheme was not well received by the counties through which it ran. As originally conceived, revenue from tolls and water power on the Lower Bann would finance maintenance work on the Upper Bann. Instead, three separate trusts were set up. These were the Upper Bann Navigation Trust, the Lower Bann Navigation Trust and the Lough Neagh Drainage Trust. The adjoining counties appointed representatives to each and also financed their continued operation. Those to the south of the lake had to contribute towards the drainage and navigation works which had been completed, and also find £800 per year for ongoing maintenance, with no source of income to cover it. Coleraine was expanded as a port, but even the Lower Bann did not generate the expected revenue, and the adjoining counties had to finance an annual deficit of around £400. A passenger service between Coleraine and Toomebridge was started in 1863, but the increased flow on the river made travel upstream difficult, and the service was abandoned. Like so many schemes that tried to combine drainage and navigation, this one did neither particularly well.

Flooding around the southern shores of Lough Neagh continued to be a problem, and in 1882 the chairman of Portadown Town Commissioners suggested that Alexander Nimmo's scheme should be revived. The Upper Bann would be made much deeper near the lough, so that its flow could be reversed, and the amount of water entering the lough reduced correspondingly. The proposal was no better received than when Nimmo had originally made it. Both the Monck Commission, which sat in the early 1880s, and an enquiry into the Board of Works held in 1887, suggested that for the benefit of flood relief, the navigation should be abandoned, and that the three Trusts were counter-productive. No action was taken, and when the President of the Institution of Civil Engineers, Sir Alexander Binnie, was asked for his advice in 1906, he came to a similar conclusion. He suggested that a canalised river, which in winter had a flow of between 188 and 376 cubic metres per second (400,000 and 800,000 cu ft/min) was never going to succeed. Again his advice was ignored, as the navigation works were still relatively new. The counties continued to fund the annual deficit.

A proposal to build a hydro-electric scheme across the Lower Bann in 1925 came to nothing, and four years later, the Lough Neagh Drainage Trust and the Lower Bann Navigation Trust were disbanded, with the Ministry of Finance assuming responsibility for the river. The counties contributing to the Upper Bann Navigation Trust appealed for that to be disbanded too, but the appeal was refused and they had to continue funding it. Some improvements to weirs were made by the Ministry of Finance, and there was some traffic, consisting mostly of sand dredged from Lough Neagh and used by brickworks. Finally, in 1954, responsibility for the Upper Bann was transferred to the Ministry of Commerce, the Trust was disbanded, and the navigation was abandoned. The Lower Bann has seen an increase in use by pleasure craft, and now supports four marinas, two at Coleraine, one at Drumaheglis and one at Portglenone.

== See also ==
- List of rivers of Ireland
- Rivers of Ireland

== Bibliography ==
- Cumberlidge, Jane (2002). The Inland Waterways of Ireland. Imray Laurie Norie and Wilson. ISBN 978-0-85288-424-9.
- Delany, Ruth (2004). Ireland's Inland Waterways. Appletree Press. ISBN 978-0-86281-824-1.
- Dillon, Peter (2023). THE CONG CANAL Mystery of an Abandoned Waterway. Kenilworth & Collins. ISBN 978-0-95611-891-2.
- McCutcheon, W A (1965). The Canals of the North of Ireland. David and Charles. ISBN 978-0-7153-4028-8.
