= Percy Shepherd =

Percy Shepherd OBE (8 August 1878 – March 1948) was an eminent British military and civil engineer specialising in docks, waterways, harbour works, and drainage.

== Early career ==
Percy Shepherd was born in Romford, Essex on 8 August 1878 but was brought up in the north of England. He attended school at The College, Buxton, Derbyshire from 1891 to 1894, and on leaving school spent a year in the millwright's department of Armstrong Whitworth & Co. of Manchester. He then served a four-year pupilage with Berkeley Deane Wise, Chief Engineer to the Belfast and Northern Counties Railway, in Belfast from 1895 until 1899. During his pupilage he was engaged in work for the Belfast and Northern Counties Railway, including the re-arrangement of York Street Station and the erection of the new railway hotel, the Northern Counties Hotel. Then he worked for ten years as an assistant to W.B. Worthington on the Lancashire & Yorkshire Railway, before setting up in independent practice in Manchester around 1909 when he around 31 years old.

== Military career ==
On the outbreak of the First World War he joined the coastal defence company Kent Fortress Royal Engineers as a 2nd Lieutenant. After training, he transferred to the Inland Waterways and Docks company of the Royal Engineers and spent his war years in waterways, docks and harbour works, being promoted through the ranks to Major in 1918. By the end of the war he had been given command of the construction of the National Shipyard at Portbury on the Avon. He was made an Officer of the Order of the British Empire (OBE) in 1920 for services to National Shipyards.

== Post-military career ==
He was retained on Government service after the war, when he was sent to Danzig as technical adviser to the High Commissioner who had charge of the apportionment between Danzig and Poland of former German and Prussian property. On his return from Danzig he spent a year with the Office of Works in London before being offered the position of chief engineer to the newly established Northern Ireland Ministry of Finance. Shepherd was appointed as Director of the Board of Works for the Government of Northern Ireland. Two of his most outstanding projects were the Bann drainage Scheme carried out in the 1930s and the Lough Erne drainage scheme carried out in the 1950s. Shepherd formed the Northern Ireland association of the Institution of Civil Engineers in 1934 and became its first Chairman.

== Personal life ==
Percy lived with his wife in Bangor, Northern Ireland in a house built in 1924 and designed by RI Smith and T. F. O. Rippingham, which was controversially demolished in 2008. He had one son, Lambert Charles Shepherd, who attended Shrewsbury School and Jesus College, Cambridge, and won the Ladies' Challenge Plate at Henley Royal Regatta, but who unfortunately was killed in World War II while serving in the Royal Navy on HMS Hood. Percy Shepherd established a scholarship at Jesus College in memory of his son.

== Further information ==
- Institution of Civil Engineers Northern Ireland "Notice" Issue 10 Spring 2009
- The British Army in the Great War
