= List of Presbyterian churches =

Notable Presbyterian congregations or buildings

This is a list of local Presbyterian churches that are notable either as congregations or as buildings. For Presbyterian denominations, see List of Presbyterian denominations.

== Asia ==
=== India ===
| Church | Image | Dates | Location | City | Description |
|---|---|---|---|---|---|
| Afghan Church | | 1858 built | 18.903648°N 72.815076°E | South Mumbai, India | Gothic Revival |

=== Israel/Palestine ===
| Church | Image | Built | Location | City | Description |
|---|---|---|---|---|---|
| St Andrew's Church | | 1927–30 | Sh.A. Nachon; 31°46′7.76″N 35°13′31.35″E | Jerusalem | Church of Scotland-governed memorial church to Scottish soldiers killed fighting the Ottoman Empire during World War I. |

=== Singapore ===
| Church | Image | Built | Location | City | Description |
|---|---|---|---|---|---|
| Prinsep Street Presbyterian Church | | 1843 founded 1930 built | Prinsep Street; 1°18′06.1″N 103°51′04″E | Singapore | |
| Bethel Presbyterian Church | | | Serangoon | Singapore | |

=== South Korea ===
| Church | Image | Dates | Location | City | Description |
|---|---|---|---|---|---|
| Myungsung Presbyterian Church | | 1980 founded 1989 built | Myeongil-dong; 37°32′54″N 127°8′53″E | Seoul | Gothic Revival |
| Somang Presbyterian Church | | | Gangnam-gu | Seoul | |
| Dongcheon Church | | | Seoul | Founded by evacuees from Hungnam in what is now North Korea | |
| Onnuri Community Church | | 19xx founded 19xx built | Seobinggo | Seoul | Modern |
| Sarang Community Church | | 19xx founded 19xx built | Gangnam | Seoul | Modern |

== Europe ==
=== The Netherlands ===
| Church | Image | Built | Location | City | Description |
|---|---|---|---|---|---|
| English Reformed Church, Amsterdam | | | Begijnhof 48; 52°22′09″N 4°53′24″E | Amsterdam | |

=== Italy ===
| Church | Image | Built | Location | City | Description |
|---|---|---|---|---|---|
| St Andrew's Church, Rome | | 1860s founded | Begijnhof 48; 41°54′11″N 12°29′30″E | Rome | |

=== United Kingdom ===
==== England ====
| Church | Image | Built | Location | City | Description |
|---|---|---|---|---|---|
| Church of Saint Andrew | | 1823 built 1975 closed 1983 burned | Rodney Street; 53°24′10.8″N 2°58′21.72″W | Liverpool | Neoclassical; Now ruinous, formerly served as a Church of Scotland church. |
| Lewes Free Presbyterian Church | | 1805 founded | Malling Street, Cliffe; 50.8755°N 0.0187°E | East Sussex | Georgian |
| St Luke's Church, Silverhill | | 1853 founded 1857 built | Sedlescombe Road North; 50.8695°N 0.5572°E | Silverhill, Hastings, East Sussex | Gothic Revival. Presbyterian church that joined the United Reformed Church in 1972. Building lost its distinctive spire in the Great Storm of 1987. |

==== Scotland ====
| Church | Image | Built | Location | City | Description |
|---|---|---|---|---|---|
| Brechin Cathedral | | 11th–13th centuries | Church Lane; 56°43′55″N 2°39′42″W | Brechin | Gothic; Now a Church of Scotland parish church. |
| Church of the Holy Rude | | 1129 founded | 56.120882°N 3.944521°W | Stirling | site of coronation of James VI by John Knox |
| Dornoch Cathedral | | 13th–19th centuries | High Street; 57°52′53″N 4°1′45″W | Dornoch | Gothic; Now a Church of Scotland parish church. |
| Dunblane Cathedral | | Primarily 12th–13th centuries | The Cross; 56°11′21.9″N 3°57′54.8″W | Dunblane | Romanesque and Gothic; Now a Church of Scotland parish church. |
| Dunkeld Cathedral | | 1260–1501 | Cathedral Street; 56°33′54″N 3°35′23″W | Dunkeld | Gothic; Now a Church of Scotland parish church. |
| Glasgow Cathedral | | From late 12th century onwards | Castle Street; 55°52′46.7″N 4°14′4″W | Glasgow | Gothic; Also known as the High Kirk of Glasgow and St. Mungo's Cathedral. |
| St Giles' Cathedral | | Late 14th century | Royal Mile; 55°56′58″N 3°11′27″W | Edinburgh | Gothic; As the High Kirk of Edinburgh, it the principal place of worship of the Church of Scotland in Edinburgh. |
| St Machar's Cathedral | | 12th–16th centuries | The Chanonry; 57°10′11.2″N 2°6′7.5″W | Aberdeen | Gothic; Now a Church of Scotland parish church. |
| St Magnus Cathedral | | 1137–1400s | Broad Street; 58°58′56″N 2°57′32″W | Kirkwall | Gothic; Now a Church of Scotland parish church. |
| St Moluag's Cathedral | | Medieval–18th century | "Lismore" Road; 56°32′4″N 5°28′50″W | Lismore | Gothic Revival; Little remains of original cathedral, now a Church of Scotland parish church. |

=== Ireland ===
| Church | Image | Built | Location | City | Description |
|---|---|---|---|---|---|
| First Kilrea Presbyterian Church | | 1873 founded | 54.949°N 6.556°W | Kilrea, County Londonderry, Northern Ireland | |
| Second Ballyeaston Presbyterian Church | | 1768 founded | Mount Merrion Avenue; 54.772°N 6.004°W | Ballyeaston, County Antrim, Northern Ireland | |
| St. Andrew's, Blackrock | | 1895 founded | Mount Merrion Avenue; 53.301567°N 6.184525°W} | Blackrock, Dublin | |

== North America ==
=== Canada ===
| Church | Image | Dates | Location | City | Description |
|---|---|---|---|---|---|
| Knox Presbyterian Church (Toronto) | | 1843 founded 1909 built | 630 Spadina Avenue; 43.662522°N 79.402463°W | Toronto, Ontario | Romanesque Revival, Gothic Revival |

=== United States ===
In the United States, many Presbyterian churches are notable for their active and large congregations, for their age, for their size, or for the architecture of their buildings. Many are listed on the National Register of Historic Places (NRHP) or on state and local historic registers. Some have been designated as National Historic Landmarks (NHL).

== Oceania ==
=== Australia ===
| Church | Image | Dates | Location | City | Description |
|---|---|---|---|---|---|
| Hunter Baillie Memorial Presbyterian Church | | 1886 founded | Cnr Johnstone and Collins Streets, Annandale NSW; 33.8833°S 151.1694°E | Annandale, New South Wales | Neo-Gothic |
| Scots' Church, Melbourne | | 1838 founded 1871–1874 built | Collins Street; 37.81478°S 144.96902°E | Melbourne | Neo-Gothic |
| St Andrew's Church, Manly, Sydney | | 1889 founded | 56 Raglan Street, Manly, NSW 2095; 33.795234°S 151.283222°E | Manly, New South Wales | Romanesque |
| Malvern Presbyterian Church, Melbourne | | 1886 founded, 1906 Building | 163 Wattletree Road, Malvern, Vic 3143; 37.8626°S 145.031205°E | Malvern, Victoria | Arts and Crafts |

=== New Zealand ===
| Church | Image | Built | Location | City | Description |
|---|---|---|---|---|---|
| Kaikorai Presbyterian Church | | 1868 founded | 127 Taieri Road; 45.865161°S 170.484316°E | Dunedin, New Zealand | |
| Knox Church, Dunedin | | 1860 founded | 45.867152°S 170.507083°E | Dunedin, New Zealand | Gothic Revival |
| St Paul's Church, Christchurch | | 1864 founded 1877 built | corner Cashel and Madras Streets43°32′0.2″S 172°38′34.6″E | Christchurch, New Zealand | |
| East Taieri Presbyterian Church | | 1870 built | 12a Cemetery Road; 45.8900468°S 170.3450276°E | Mosgiel, New Zealand | |

== South America ==
=== Brazil ===
| Church | Image | Dates | Location | City | Description |
|---|---|---|---|---|---|
| Presbyterian Cathedral of Rio de Janeiro | | 1862 founded 1940s built | Silva Jardim Street; 22°54′28″S 43°10′52″W | Rio de Janeiro | Gothic Revival |
