= Onnuri Community Church =

Onnuri
- Onnuri Community Church
- Onnuri Presbyterian Church
- Korean: 온누리교회
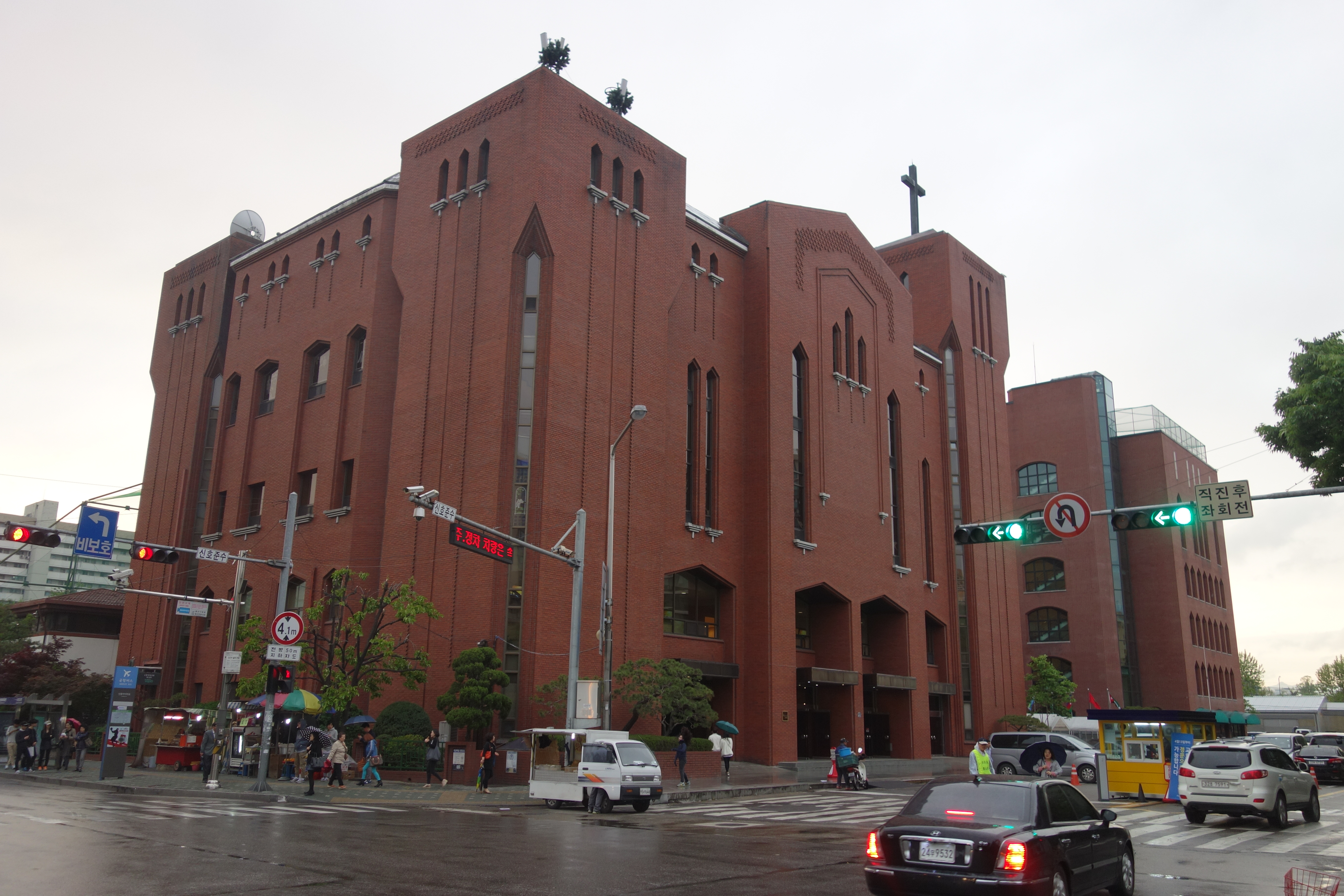
- Country: South Korea
- Denomination: Presbyterian
- Churchmanship: Protestant
- Website: www.onnuri.or.kr

History
- Founded: 1986
- Founder: Ha Yong-jo

Onnuri Community Church (sometimes stylized OnNuRi Community Church, abbreviated OCC, also called Onnuri, Onnuri Church, and Onnuri Presbyterian Church) is a local church in Seoul, South Korea, founded by Ha Yong-jo.

== History ==
Ha Yong-jo began Onnuri Church in 1985 with 12 families. It has since grown to become one of South Korea's largest Presbyterian churches. As one of approximately 25 megachurches in Korea, and is an emerging church, engaging in postmodern modes of evangelism, organizational structure, and leadership.

The main church building and administration housing cost millions of dollars to build and are located in Yongsan District. It currently occupies five different church buildings spread out over Seoul, encompassing congregations speaking ten different languages.

Onnuri English Ministry, spread out over three different church buildings, is the largest English-language Presbyterian ministry in Korea, employing seven part-time pastors and four full-time pastors.

By 2004, 25,000 members were registered church members and by 2006, 46,000 adults were registered church members, 41,500 of which were in regular attendance of Sunday church services.

== Social care ==
Onnuri took on much of Handong Global University's debt in the mid-1990s when the university was experiencing financial distress.

== Controversy and criticism ==
Onnuri Church has been criticized for teaching creation science, and for sermons preaching geocentric creationism.

In 2024, Onnuri Church held a rally against the legalization of same-sex marriage in South Korea, saying that "homosexuality is a sin". The rally was described as "hate speech" and some unrelated onlookers were concerned by the public setting of the event.

== Notable members ==
- Chung Yong-jin, chairman of Shinsegae

== See also ==
- Christianity in Korea
- List of Presbyterian churches
