= Blackrock Further Education Institute =

- Established: 1982
- Principal: Tina Reddin
- Students: 1,000
- Location: Main Street; Blackrock, Dublin, Ireland; 53.3009°N 6.1757°W
- Website: bfei.ie

Blackrock Further Education Institute (BFEI; formerly Senior College Dún Laoghaire) is a college of further education in Dublin which was established in 1982. In 2014 it moved to the refurbished Blackrock Town Hall, Library and Technical Institute complex. It provides both higher educational qualifications (BTEC Higher National Diploma) as well as technical/vocational education and training in areas including Beauty Therapy, Creative Multimedia, Marketing, Auctioneering and Estate Agency Practice, Accountancy and Design. Blackrock Further Education Institute is located in Blackrock, 17 kilometres (11 mi) from Dublin City Centre.

The institute developed courses in Accounting, Marketing and Auctioneering, Business, Beautician, Health and Wellbeing Therapies, Creative Multimedia, Computing and Communications Technology and Interior Design courses for both full-time and part-time students. As of 2020, BFEI had over 1,000 students and was offering full-time, mornings-only and night courses. The institute provides awards at QQI Levels 5 and 6 as well as the more advanced BTEC/Edexcel Higher National Diploma. A number of students who successfully complete the Higher National Diploma in Business progress on to the third (and final) year of a related degree in Swansea Metropolitan University or IADT Dun Laoghaire.

The new campus at Blackrock involved the restoration and refurbishment of three protected buildings, Blackrock Town Hall, the Carnegie Library and the Blackrock Technical Institute. While maintaining the facade, the interior was restructured and a new L-shaped building, was added, incorporating a structural steel frame with block-work infill. In 2015, the building was nominated at the Irish Building and Design Awards in the category Building Project of the Year, and it was shortlisted for an award from the Royal Institute of the Architects of Ireland in the same year.
