= St. John the Baptist, Blackrock =

St. John the Baptist
- St. John the Baptist, Blackrock
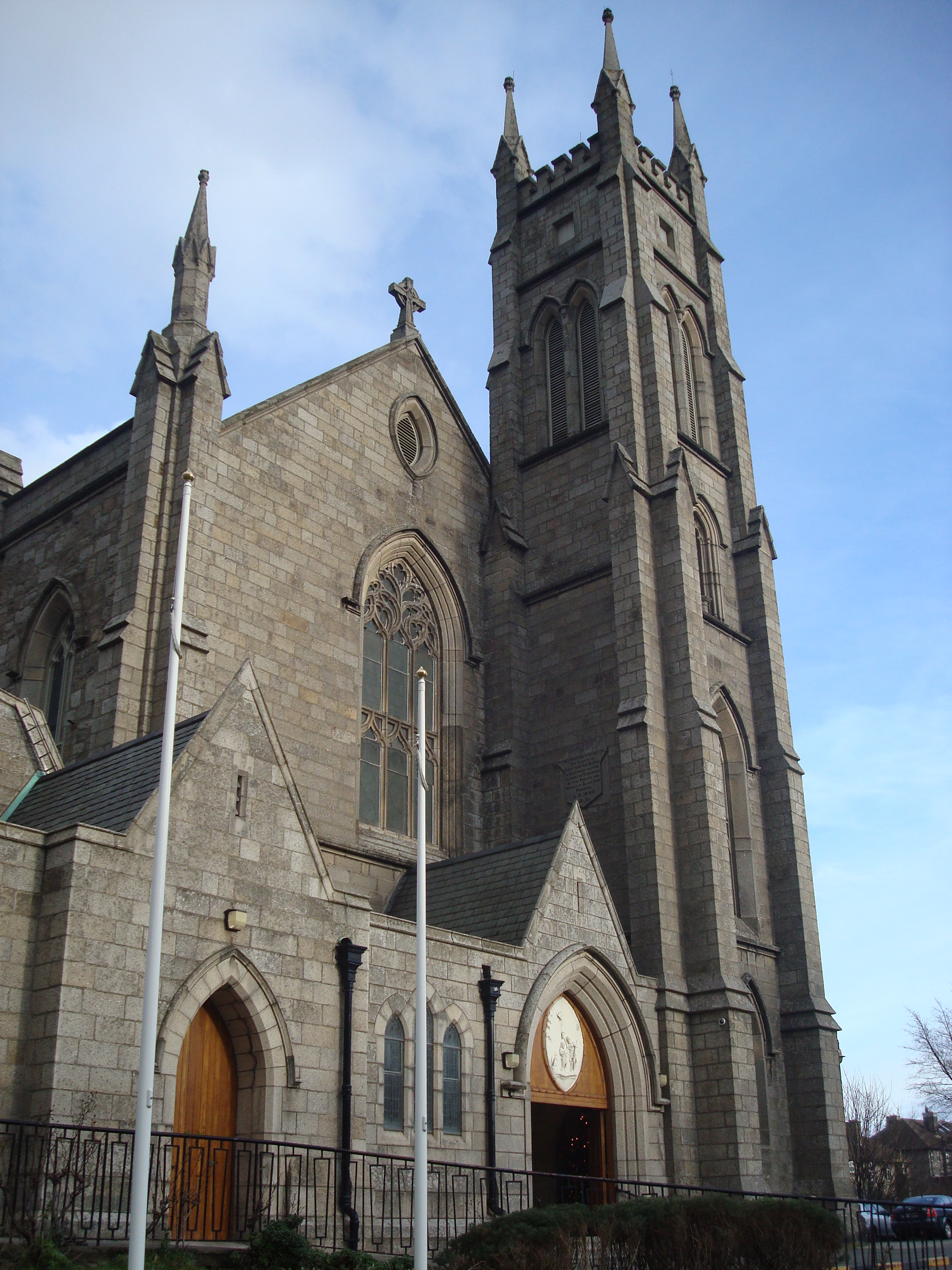
- St. John the Baptist
- 53.300077°N 6.174958°W
- Location: Temple Road; Blackrock; County Dublin
- Country: Ireland
- Denomination: Roman Catholic
- Website: https://sjb.ie/

History
- Founded: 1845
- Dedication: John the Baptist
- Dedicated: 14 September 1845

Architecture
- Architect: Patrick Byrne (1783-1864)
- Architectural type: Church
- Style: Gothic Revival
- Groundbreaking: 24 June 1842

Administration
- Archdiocese: Dublin
- Deanery: Dun Laoghaire
- Parish: Blackrock

St. John the Baptist, Blackrock is a Roman Catholic church in the parish of Blackrock, Ireland. The church is still in use and named after the Saint John the Baptist. It is located on Temple Road, Blackrock, County Dublin.

== History ==
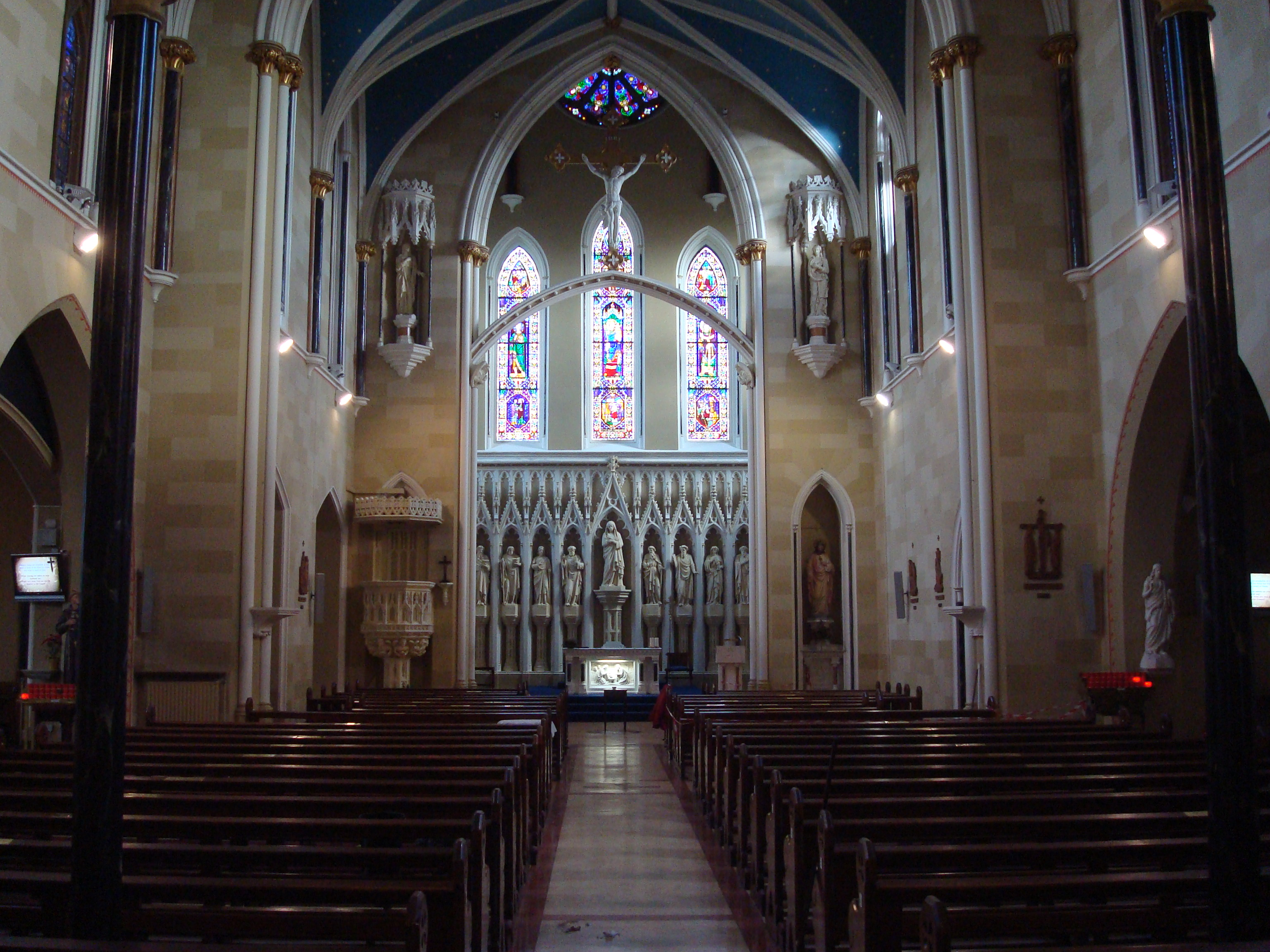
Inside St. John the Baptist, Blackrock. The view of the altar from the main door to the church.

The church is built on land given for the purpose by Valentine Lawless, 2nd Baron Cloncurry, whose summer residence was nearby Maretimo House. The building of the church commenced with the laying of a single foundation stone on the feast of St. John the Baptist, 24 June 1842. Building completed in 1845 and the church was dedicated on 14 September 1845 by the Most Rev. Dr. Daniel Murray, Archbishop of Dublin.

The church was built as a replacement of the chapel of the Carmelite monastery on Sweetman's Avenue. The old chapel was demolished and another chapel built in its place which can now be seen as part of the Blackrock Hospice.

The area the church occupies, first came under the parish of Monkstown. Later, after the reformation, the area came under the parish of Booterstown. It was 1922 when the parish of Blackrock came into being.

== Architecture ==
The church was designed by the architect Patrick Byrne, who was educated at the Dublin Society Schools. It is one of the finest examples of the Gothic revival style in Ireland and was the first to be built in the Dublin Archdiocese. It is said to be inspired by the ideas of Augustus Welby Pugin (1812–1852).

The initial building consisted of the nave, chancel and bell tower. To the rear of the church, two carved heads can be seen up high on either side of the rose window. The head on the left depicts St. John the Baptist, while the head on the right depicts the Archbishop Daniel Murray.

In 1850, additions were made to the east side, to the right of the entrance. These included an aisle, baptistry, vestry and a chapel in honour of Our Lady.

In 1931–1932, the old school to the west side of the church was demolished and an additional aisle, St. Anne's aisle, was constructed. This included the St. Anne's chapel and the Blessed Sacrament chapel.

== Inside ==
=== Altar ===
To the rear of the altar there are nine statues representing the "Bearers of the Word". At the centre is Our Lady (Blessed Virgin Mary) followed to her right is St. Peter, St. Mark, St. James and St. Matthew. To her left is St. Paul, St. Luke, St. John and St. Jude.

=== Stained Glass Windows ===
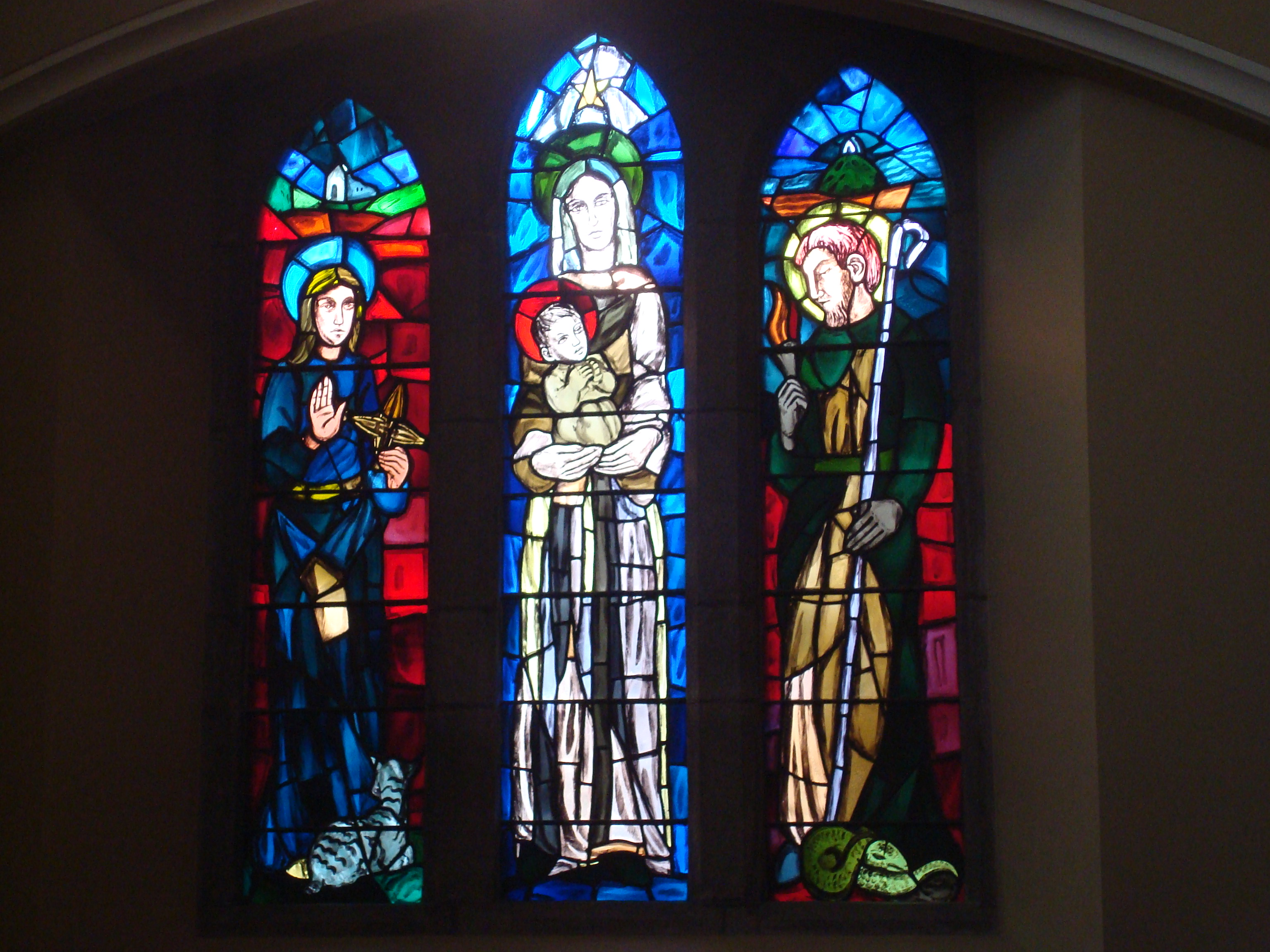
The Evie Hone stained glass donated by the McGuire family in 1955.

In 1925, through a donation by the family of John Murphy of Avoca Avenue, Harry Clarke Studio was commissioned to create two stained glass windows. These windows can be seen as the third stained glass windows on both the west and east aisles.

1932 saw new stained glass windows installed in the St. Anne's aisle, by the Early Studios.

In 1955, the Evie Hone stained glass windows were presented by the McGuire family in memory of Brigid Patricia McGuire, wife of Senator Edward McGuire and mother of the portrait painter Edward McGuire (1932–1986). This window was one of the last produced by Evie Hone.

== See also ==
- Roman Catholic Archdiocese of Dublin
