= Ha Yong-jo =

South Korean pastor (1946–2011)

- Hangul: 하용조
- Hanja: 河用祚
- RR: Ha Yongjo
- MR: Ha Yongjo

Ha Yong-jo or Hah Yong Jo (Korean: 하용조; 1946–2011) was the founding pastor of Onnuri Community Church in Seoul, South Korea.

== Biography ==
Born in 1946 in South Pyeongan Province (now, part of North Korea), Ha studied at Konkuk University and Presbyterian College and Theological Seminary in Seoul.

He brought together twelve families in 1984 to establish Onnuri Community Church. His approach was to model the church after the book of Acts, in what became known as the Acts 29 Vision, in building churches and sending out missionaries. By June 2010, Onnuri had sent 1,200 missionaries and maintained a membership of 75,000.

Ha Yong-jo had liver cancer and died on August 2, 2011, in Seoul.

=== Major life events ===
- 1951: Fled to Mokpo during the Korean War.
- March 1964: Entered the Department of Animal Science and Food Processing at Konkuk University, graduated in 1972.
- 1965: Joined the Korean Campus Crusade for Christ (CCC), served for 7 years.
- August 1966: Experienced spiritual rebirth at the CCC Summer Conference.
- March 1972: Entered the Presbyterian Theological Seminary, graduated in 1975.
- May 1976: Ordained as a pastor.
- 1980: Established the "Celebrity Church" and founded Duranno Publishing House.
- 1981-1983: Studied at the Bible College in the UK, WEC International Mission Center, and London Institute.
- 1985: Founded Onnuri Church.
- 1995: Elected Chairman of the Board of Trustees at Handong Global University.
- 1998: Awarded an honorary Doctor of Literature degree from Biola University, established Onnuri Welfare Foundation.
- 1999: Elected Chairman of the Board of Trustees at Shindongah Academy.
- 2000: Launched Onnuri Internet Broadcasting Station.
- 2002: Opened Yongsan Senior Citizens Comprehensive Welfare Center, awarded an honorary Doctor of Divinity from Trinity University.
- 2004: Elected a board member at Handong Global University.
- 2005: Appointed President of Torch Trinity Graduate University, established and launched the headquarters of CGNTV.
- 2006: Awarded an honorary Doctor of Philosophy degree from Myongji University, opened the Onnuri Senior Care Center in Yongin.
- 2007: Started Okinawa Love Sonata.

=== Education ===
- Presbyterian Theological Seminary (M.Div)
- Completed coursework at London Bible College, UK
- Completed coursework at London Institute, UK
- Honorary Doctor of Letters from Biola University, USA
- Honorary Doctor of Theology from Trinity
- Honorary Doctor of Philosophy from Myongji University
- Honorary Doctor of Christian Studies from Soongsil University
- Honorary Doctor of Theology from Presbyterian University and Theological Seminary
