= Blackrock Town Hall, Library and Technical Institute =

Municipal building in Blackrock, County Dublin, Ireland

- Halla an Bhaile, Leabharlann agus Institiúid Theicniúil An Charraig Dhubh
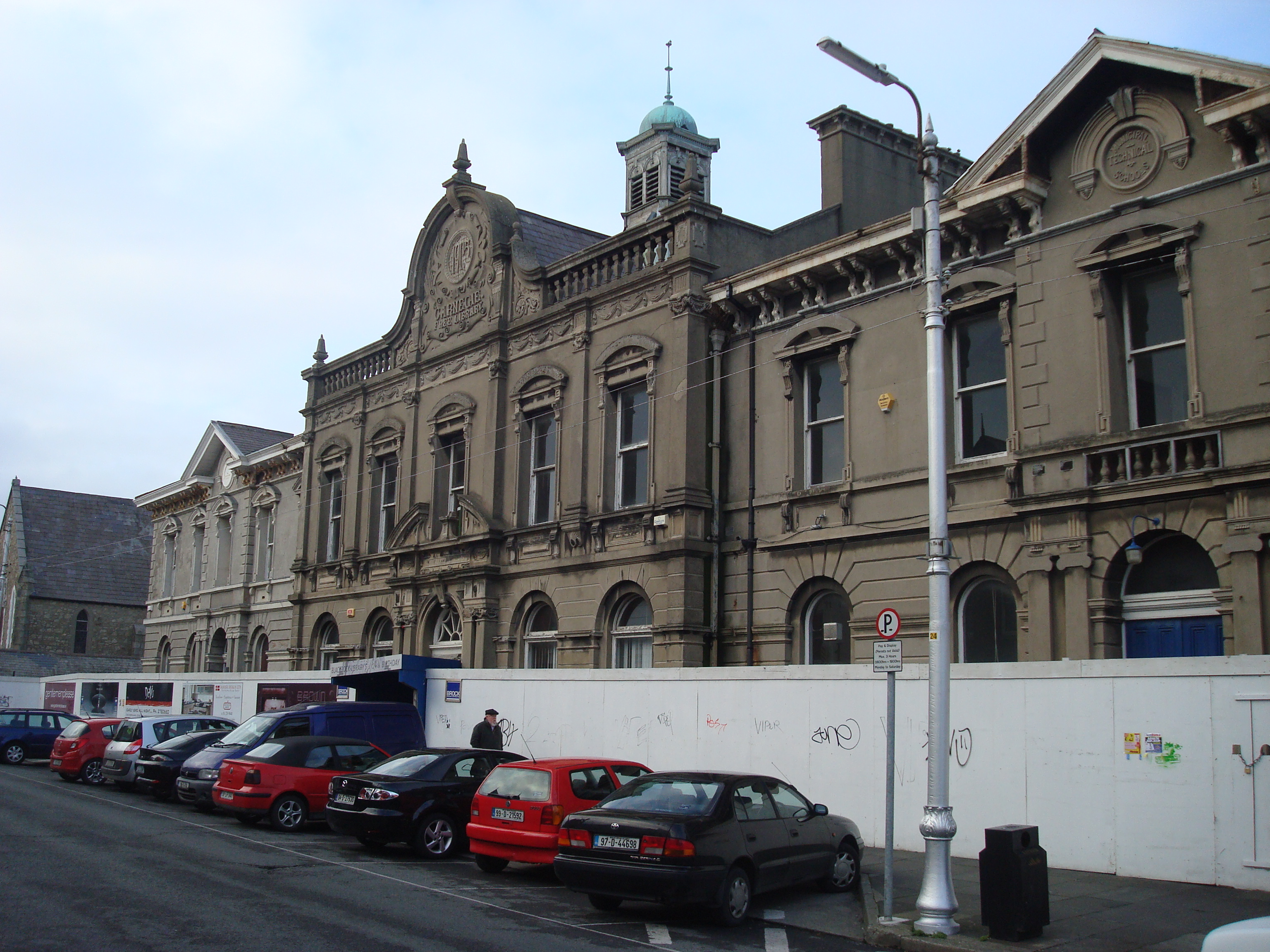
- The former town hall (on the left), the library (in the centre) and the former technical institute (on the right)

- Location within Dublin

General information
- Architectural style: Neoclassical style
- Location: Main Road, Blackrock, Ireland
- Coordinates: 53.3009°N 6.1754°W
- Completed: 1905

Design and construction
- Architect: George Luke O'Connor

Blackrock Town Hall, Library and Technical Institute (Irish: Halla an Bhaile, Leabharlann agus Institiúid Theicniúil An Charraig Dhubh), is a municipal complex in Main Road, Blackrock, Dublin, Ireland. The complex consists of a series of buildings formerly known individually as Blackrock Town Hall, Blackrock Library and Blackrock Technical Institute, but now accommodates the Blackrock Further Education Institute as well as an enlarged public library.

== History ==
After significant population growth, largely associated with its development as a residential suburb of Dublin, the township of Blackrock appointed town commissioners in 1863. The town commissioners decided to erect a town hall at an early stage: the site they selected was on the north side of Main Street. The building was designed in the neoclassical style, built in ashlar stone at a cost of £3,500 and was completed in 1865. The design involved a symmetrical main frontage of five bays facing onto Main Street. The central bay, which was slightly projected forward, featured a round headed opening flanked by pairs of Ionic order pilasters supporting a cornice. The other bays on the ground floor were fenestrated with round headed windows installed within recesses, while the first floor was fenestrated by sash windows with architraves and segmental pediments supported by brackets. At roof level, there were prominent eaves supported by brackets, and an open pediment in the central bay with a clock in the tympanum.

The local Presbyterian Church, which had established its local congregation in 1895, met in the town hall until St. Andrew's Church on Mount Merrion Avenue was completed in 1899. In 1899, the town commissioners were replaced by an urban district council, with the town hall becoming the offices of the new council. During her visit to Dublin in April 1900, the route taken by Queen Victoria's carriage took her past the town hall on her journey from Kingstown, now Dún Laoghaire, to central Dublin.

In the early 20th century, following a consultation, the new council decided to extend the building to the southeast with the creation of a library, financed by a grant of £3,000 from the Scottish-American philanthropist, Andrew Carnegie, and with the creation of a new Technical Institute. The site was donated by the member of parliament, William Field.

The library, at the centre of the extended frontage, was slightly projected forward and was more elaborate than the town hall, with an ornate open pediment above the front door, full-height pilasters flanking each of the bays, panels containing swags above the first floor windows, and a long balustraded parapet at roof level, broken by a round-headed pediment above the central bay. Conversely, the technical institute, on the right of the extended frontage, exactly mirrored the style of the town hall, on the left of the extended frontage. The extension was carried out by a local contractor, C. T. Jolley, to a design by George Luke O'Connor.

The town hall continued to be an important venue for public events: in August 1927, the Irish republican and leader of Fianna Fáil, Éamon de Valera, gave a speech in the town hall on his intention "to broaden and widen the Free State Assembly". It ceased to be the local seat of government in 1930 when Blackrock became part of the borough of Dún Laoghaire. In the 1950s, a Basque-Irish language activists, Deasún and Lucy Bhreatnach, established an Irish language school (gaelscoil) in the town hall. By the early 1970s, the town hall was becoming dilapidated: it served as the home of Dublin City Ballet and the Irish National College of Dance from 1982 to 1988.

In the early 21st century, a major programme of refurbishment works, involving the remodelling of much of the interior of the complex to accommodate the Blackrock Further Education Institute, was initiated and financed by the Department of Education. The works, which cost €9.5 million, were carried out by Collen Construction to a design by architects, McCollough Mulvin, and the completed building was handed over by the Tánaiste, Eamon Gilmore, in May 2014.
