= Blackrock, Dublin =

Suburb of Dublin in Dún Laoghaire-Rathdown, Ireland

Blackrock An Charraig Dhubh (Irish)
- Suburb (village core)
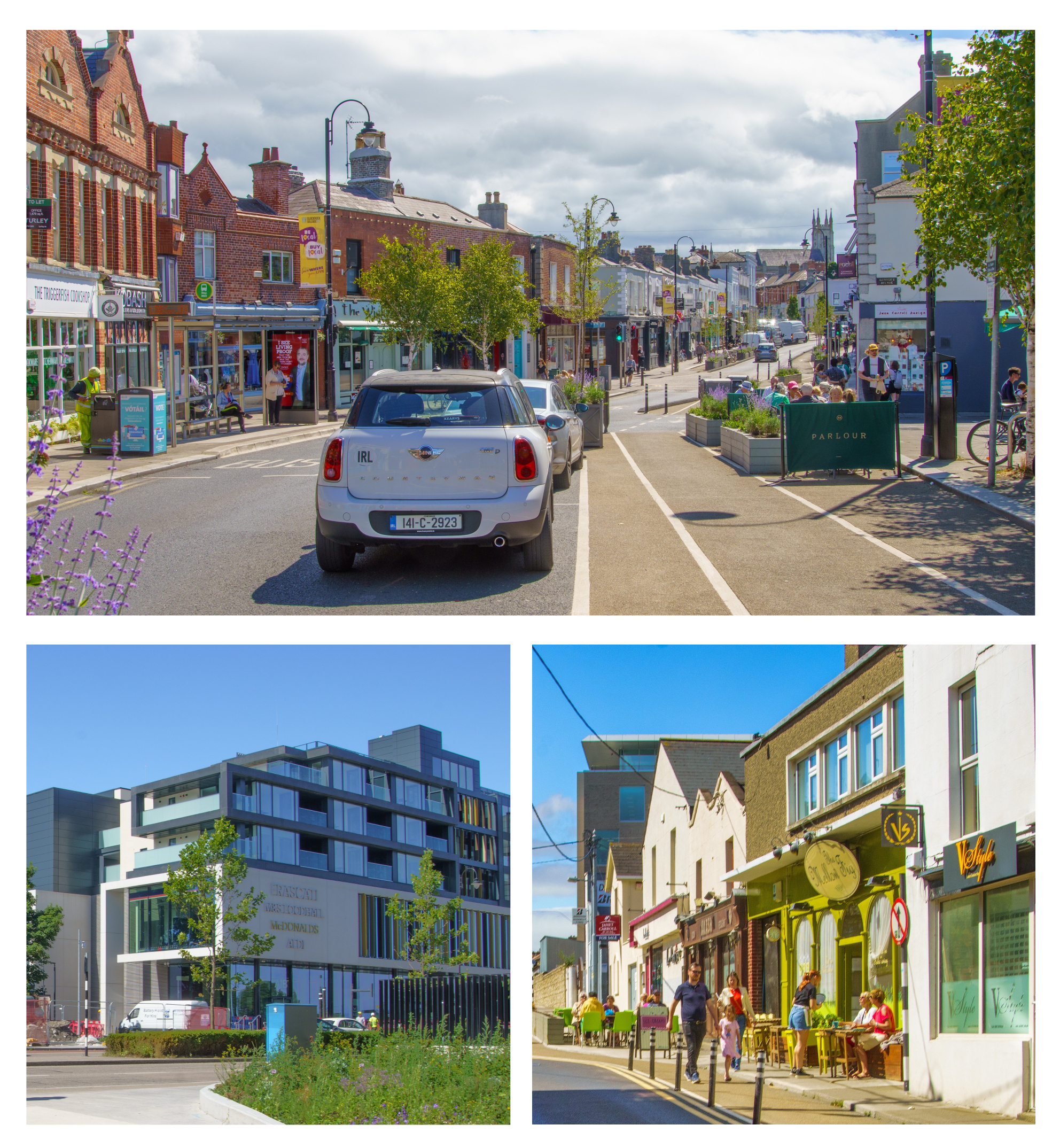
- Clockwise from top: Blackrock Main Street, George's Avenue in Blackrock, the Frascati shopping centre

- Location in Dublin Blackrock (Ireland)
- Coordinates: 53.3015°N 6.1778°W
- Country: Ireland
- Province: Leinster
- County: County Dublin
- Barony: Rathdown
- Local government area: Dún Laoghaire–Rathdown
- Highest elevation: 80 m (260 ft)
- Lowest elevation: 0 m (0 ft)

Population (2022)
  - Electoral division: 31,152
- Eircode routing key: A94
- Dialing code: 01 (+3531)
- Irish Grid Reference: O211296

Blackrock (Irish: An Charraig Dhubh) is an affluent suburb of Dublin, Ireland, 3 km (1.9 mi) northwest of Dún Laoghaire. It is named after the local geological rock formation to be found in the area of Blackrock Park. In the late 18th century, the Blackrock Road was a common place for highway robberies. The Blackrock baths, provided for by the railway company in 1839, became popular in the 19th century but Blackrock is now a tourist destination.

== History ==
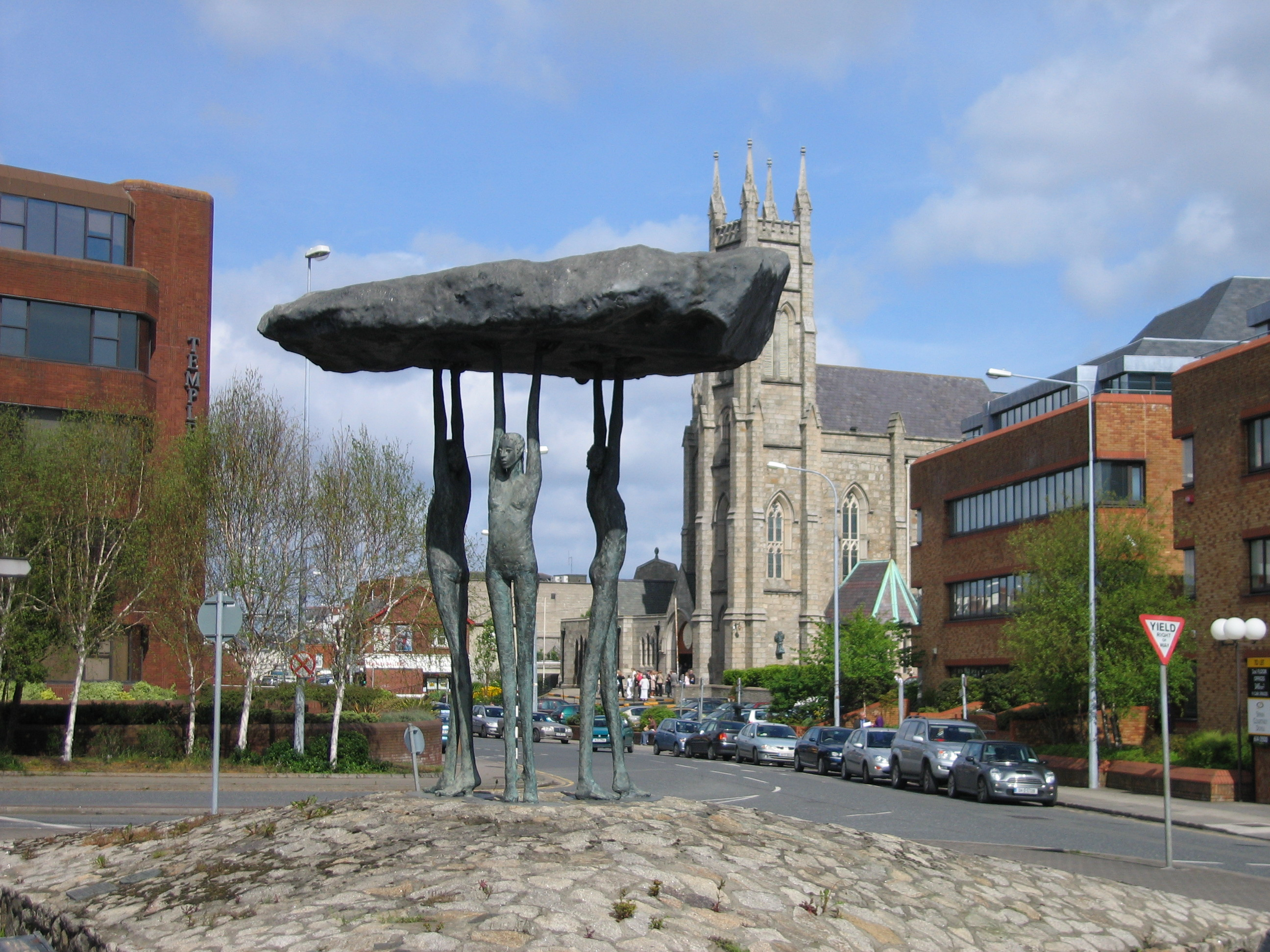
"Blackrock Dolmen" (1987) by Rowan Gillespie with the church St. John the Baptist in the background

=== Origin of the name ===
Blackrock, some hundreds of years ago, was variously called Newtown-at-the Black Rock, Newtown on the Strand by the Black Rock, Newtown Castle Byrne, or simply Newtown, so that "Blackrock" is simply an abbreviation of one of its ancient titles. For example, the town was called Newtown in a 1488 Act of Parliament. The name still survives in Newtown Avenue, and Newtown House. It was thus distinguished from Newtown-in-the-Deer-Park, as the village of Newtown Park was then called, from the circumstance that it was built in the Deer Park belonging to Stillorgan House, or Castle (a quo Newtownpark Avenue).

Blackrock is named after the local geological rock formation to be found in the area of Blackrock Park. Most of it is now buried under the park, but it is said that it is possible to see it just north of the pond. The rock itself is a limestone calp that when wet appears black, thus giving the name Black Rock. For the construction of the railway in 1834, the rock was extensively used for the wall cappings between Williamstown and Blackrock and can also be seen in the walls of the train station at Blackrock. St Mary's Chapel of Ease on St. Mary's Place, nicknamed the Black Church, is constructed using the same Black Rock (limestone calp), although the rock used in its construction is locally sourced to the church.

The population at the time of the 1841 census was 2,372.

=== Rock Road ===
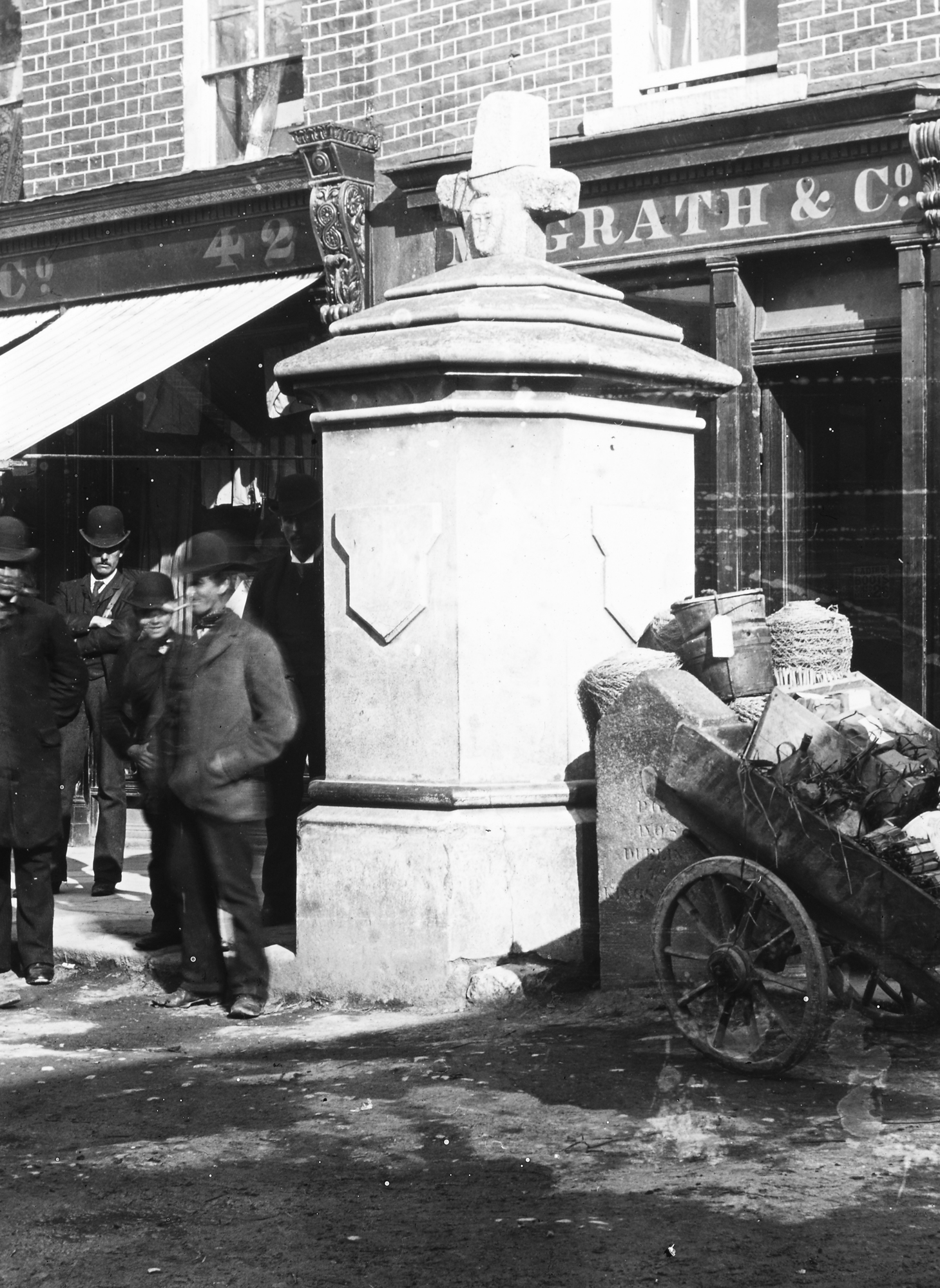
8th or 9th Century Cross at Blackrock said to mark the boundary of Dublin city

The Rock Road, which forms the south-western boundary of the park, is said to form part of one of the oldest roads in the country, having been part of the ancient Slíghe Chualann constructed by the High King of Ireland several centuries before Saint Patrick, and which connected Tara with what is now southern County Dublin and north-east County Wicklow. The road may have facilitated the O'Toole and the O'Byrne clans in their raids on the neighbourhood of Dublin.

In 1787, the Blackrock Road was such a common place for highway robberies that, in an attempt to put an end to these crimes, a local meeting was held at Jennett's Tavern in Blackrock which was chaired by the 4th Viscount Ranelagh. The meeting concluded when one of the outcomes was "Resolved, That we will give a reward of £20 to any person who will apprehend and prosecute to conviction any person guilty of a robbery upon the Blackrock-road, from Dublin to Dunleary, Bullock, Dalkey, Rochestown, Cabinteely, and Loughlinstown". In 1826, Rev. George Wogan, the curate of Donnybrook, was murdered in his house in Spafield Place near Ballsbridge. Later on the evening of his murder, two bandits were apprehended for a highway robbery on the Blackrock Road and confessed to the murder, and were hanged. This illustrates the danger faced by travellers of the Blackrock road at certain times in the past.

=== Historic houses ===
A number of houses of historical and architectural significance were built in the area, some of which are still existing today, while others have been demolished.

Frescati House, built in 1739, was at one time the childhood home of Lord Edward FitzGerald. Frescati, despite much local protest to save it, was demolished in 1983 and Frascati Shopping Centre now stands in its place.

Maretimo House was built in 1770 as a summer residence for Nicholas Lawless, 1st Baron Cloncurry, who had his main house at Lyons Hill, County Kildare. His son Valentine Lawless, 2nd Baron Cloncurry gave land beside the house for the building of the Roman Catholic Church, St. John the Baptist. At the time of the construction of the Dublin and Kingstown Railway, Lord Cloncurry was compensated with, among other things, a private railway bridge and harbour. Maretimo house was demolished in 1970 and apartments of the same name now stand in its place. The private railway bridge can still be seen today but is not maintained and its once elegant walkway has been replaced by a corrugated iron walkway.

Blackrock House, built in 1774 by Sir John Lees (1737–1811), is one of a few 18th-century houses built with red brick. It has a two-storey red brick porch and features a large coach-house, stable yard and gate lodge. With the construction of the railway, Lees was also compensated with a tunnel being built through his land. There is a ruin of a small summer house near Lord Cloncurry's harbour. In the nineteenth century, it was owned by the Vance family. The house is still here to be seen today, although it is currently divided into flats.

Rosefield (previously Belleville) was demolished in 1983 to make way for the Blackrock Clinic. Rosefield was one of the first seaside villas built on the Fitzwilliam estate around 1750.

Talbot Lodge was an 18th-century villa that was later doubled in size. It was bought by the Sisters of Charity and became part of the Linden Convalescent Home. It was sold to developers and was demolished in December 1989.

Neptune House, built in 1767, is a Georgian building with a colourful history. It was the country residence of John Scott, the first Earl of Clonmel, who was chief justice of the King's Bench in 1784. He was also known as 'Copper-faced Jack' for his aggressiveness in argument and skin tone. In 1916, British troops who landed in Dún Laoghaire during the Easter Rising stayed in Neptune House.

=== Religion in history ===
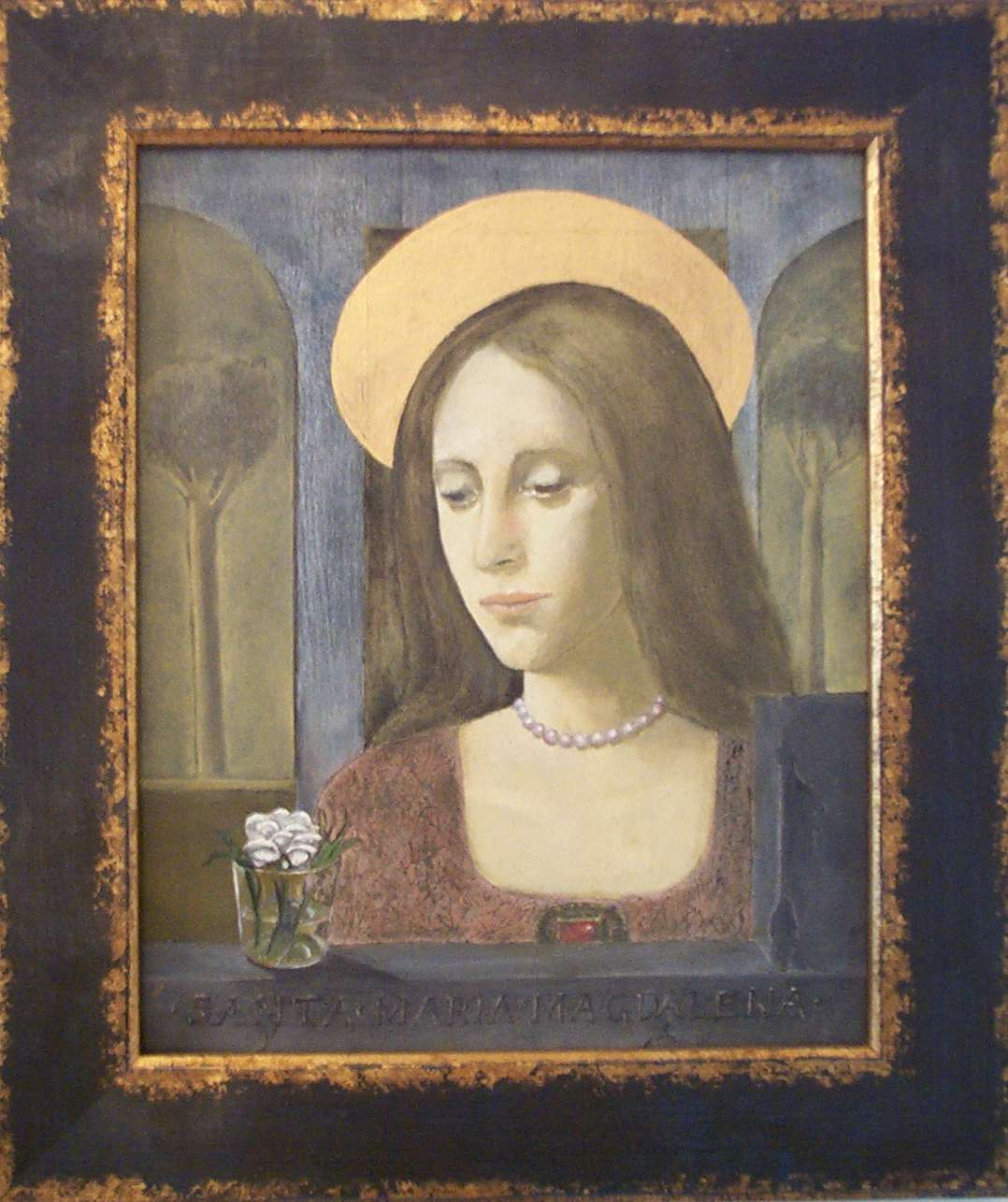
Saint Mary Magdalena by Blackrock-born artist Reginald Gray – it hangs in The Church of The Holy Cross, St.Pancras, London

The Church of Ireland built two churches in the area. The Booterstown parish was established in 1821 from the Donnybrook parish and the first church built was St. Philip and St. James Church in 1822 on Cross Avenue. To follow was All Saints Church on Carysfort Avenue in 1868.

The Catholic Daughters of Charity of Saint Vincent de Paul founded St. Catherine's Seminary in 1939 with the purchase of the house Dunardagh, Temple Hill.

The Catholic Dominican Order came to Blackrock in the 1830s with the purchase of the house Sion Hill on the corner of Mount Merrion Avenue and Cross Avenue. They set up Sion Hill Convent, a girls' school called Dominican College Sion Hill, and Froebel College of Education. They also run an Adult Education Centre and they ran St. Catherine's College of Education for Home Economics between 1929 and 2007.

The Catholic Holy Ghost Fathers came to Blackrock from Paris and established Blackrock College in 1860 with the purchase of Castle Dawson. They later bought Williamstown Castle in 1875, Clareville in 1899 and Willow Park in 1924. All of these buildings, except Clareville, are still standing today and form Blackrock College and Willow Park School.

The Kellyite sect was formed by Rev. Thomas Kelly (1769–1855), who broke away from the Church of Ireland. He built a church called Christchurch on Carysfort Avenue. In 1872 the church was handed over to the Church of Ireland. In the early 1960s, the church was demolished as it was surplus to needs. The old church was located where the car park is on the corner of Carysfort Avenue and the Blackrock Bypass.

The Methodist congregation established a church on George's Avenue in the 19th century. The church is still standing but disused. The congregation moved to a new church beside Blackrock Town Hall on Newtown Avenue. The congregation consolidated with that of Dún Laoghaire around the middle of the 20th century. Since then the Blackrock building is used as a community meeting place called Urban Junction.

The Catholic Order of St. Camillus have a community residing at South Hill Avenue while Opus Dei established Rosemont secondary school off Temple Hill around 1970.

The Presbyterian Church in Ireland established their Blackrock Congregation in 1895. It met in the Blackrock Town Hall until they built St. Andrew's Church on Mount Merrion Avenue in 1899.

The Catholic Religious Sisters of Charity arrived in 1864 with the purchase of Linden and established Linden Convalescent Home. They later bought Talbot Lodge which became part of the convalescent home. The home was sold in the late 1990s to developers who built the Linden residential complex. More recently, in 2003, the congregation expanded Our Lady's Hospice to Blackrock with the opening of The Venerable Louis and Zelie Martin Hospice.

The Roman Catholic parish of Blackrock was established from Booterstown in 1922. The first church in the area was built on Sweetman's Avenue in 1823. In 1845 a much larger church, St. John the Baptist was constructed on Temple Hill. Another church was built in 1967 on Newtownpark Avenue called the Church of the Guardian Angels.

The Society of Friends (Quakers) have their Dublin burial grounds, Friends Burial Ground, at Temple Hill. Their meeting house is on Carrickbrennan Road, Monkstown.

== Local government ==
The districts of Blackrock, Monkstown and Booterstown were joined to form a single township under the Blackrock Township Act 1863. Under the Local Government (Ireland) Act 1898, this became an urban district in 1899. The urban district of Blackrock was abolished in 1930, with its area becoming part of the borough of Dún Laoghaire. The borough was abolished in 1994, on the establishment of the county of Dún Laoghaire–Rathdown. Blackrock is a local electoral area that elects six councillors to Dún Laoghaire–Rathdown County Council.

== Features ==
=== Blackrock Town Hall, Library and Technical Institute ===
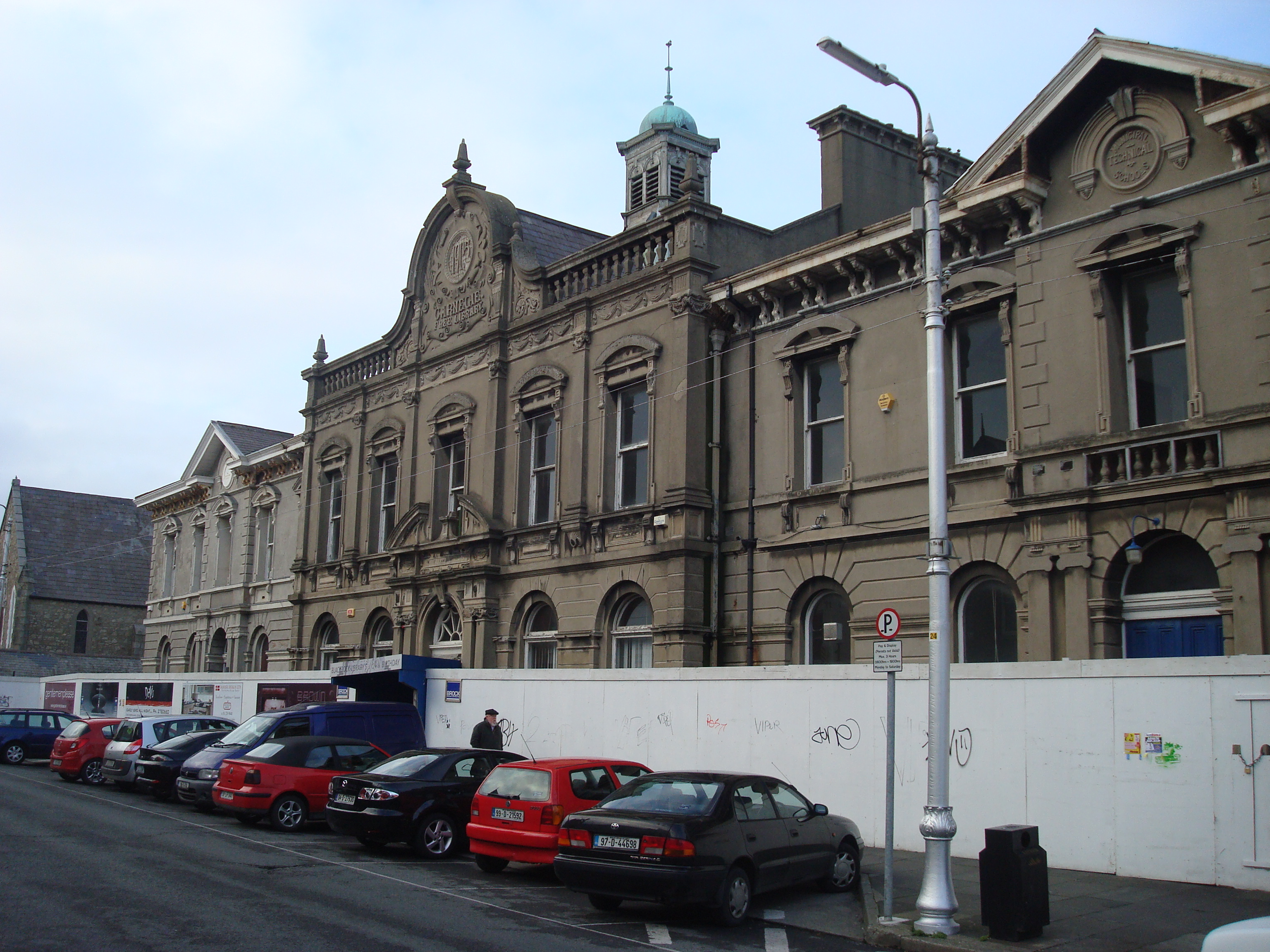
Blackrock Town Hall, Library and Technical Institute

The Blackrock Town Hall, Library and Technical Institute is a complex of buildings in Main Street. Blackrock Town Hall was completed in 1865 while the Carnegie Library and the Technical Institute were built in 1905. The site for the Technical Institute was presented to the Town Commissioners by a resident, William Field MP, in 1898.

=== Blackrock Park ===
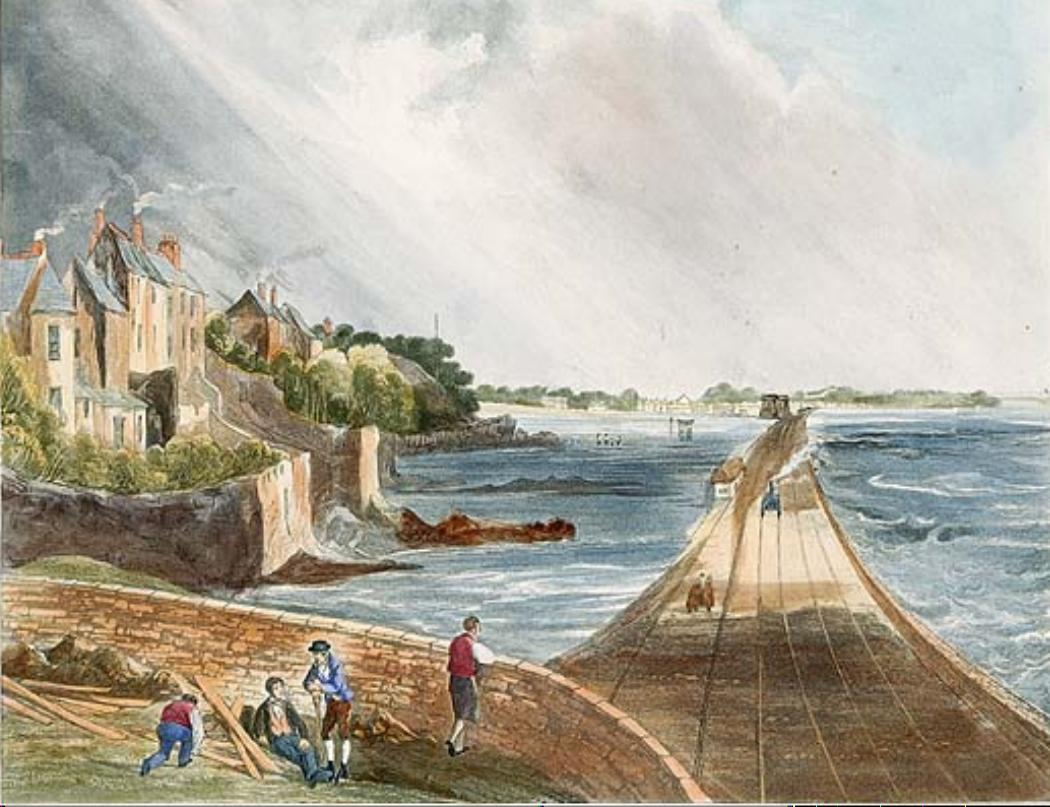
View from Blackrock railway station (1834). The Williamstown Martello tower is depicted in the distance, to the left of the train track, surrounded by water at high tide.

Blackrock had a beach that was a popular bathing place until the construction of the railway close to the shoreline. The space between the shore and the railway created an area that flooded with seawater at high tide. This created a malodorous salty marsh similar to that at Booterstown marsh. This marsh was a cause of local discomfort for years until it was decided by the Blackrock Town Commissioners (established in 1860) to fill the area in and create a park. The park, which stretches from Blackrock to Booterstown (encompassing Williamstown), was created in the early 1870s. The granite gates at the main entrance once belonged to a house called Vauxhall. The gardens at the entrance were part of the gardens of the old house.

The Williamstown Martello Tower in Blackrock Park was built between 1804 and 1806. When the tower was built, it would have been surrounded by seawater at high tide as it was built in the inter-tidal beach area. The tower became isolated from the sea when the construction of the railway took place, but seawater still flowed into the area at high tide. It wasn't until the filling in of the area to form the Blackrock Park that the tower was to be on dry land. That part of the tower which is visible today is actually the first floor as the ground floor is buried underground.

In 2007, Dún Laoghaire–Rathdown County Council published plans for the conservation and development of the park. The plans include the extensive redevelopment of the course of the Priory Stream, as well as the refurbishment of several of the buildings within the park. As of 2013, no work has been carried out as part of the redevelopment master plan, with no start date published.

=== Baths ===
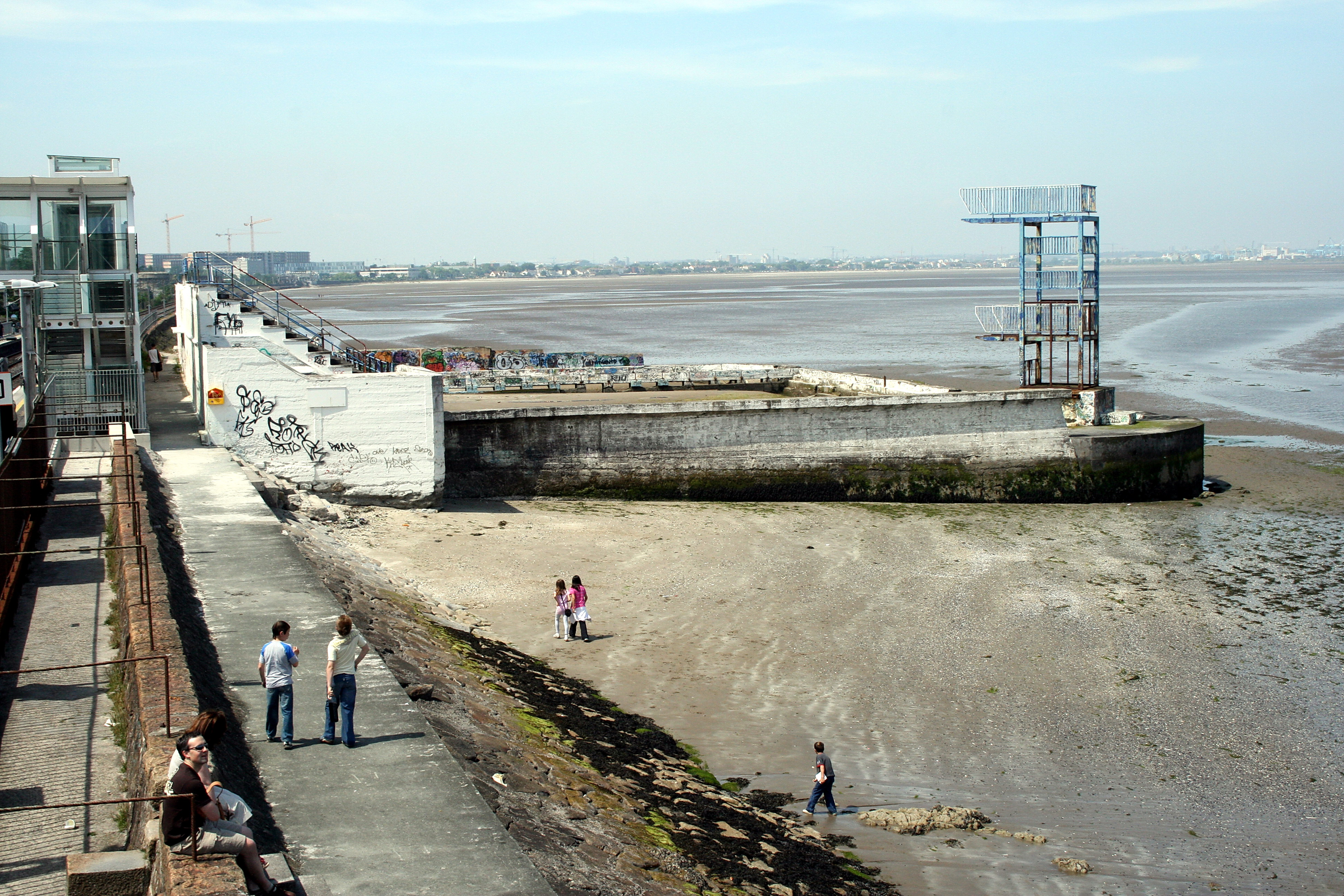
Blackrock Baths in 2007. Now demolished

The Blackrock baths were provided for by the railway company in 1839 and were built beside the Blackrock train station. A special train ticket also permitted entrance to the baths. In 1887, the baths were rebuilt in concrete with a large gentlemen's bath and a smaller ladies' bath. In 1928, the Urban District Council bought the baths for £2,000 and readied them for the Tailteann Games. The baths, with a 50-metre pool, were well known for their swimming galas and water polo and could accommodate up to 1,000 spectators."

Eddie Heron lived in Sandycove and is known for his achievement as 36 years undefeated Springboard and Highboard Diving Champion of Ireland. A plaque commemorating him is on the railway bridge that crosses over to the baths.

On 11 September 1891, Thomas Crean, while swimming with fellow students near Blackrock, helped rescue a 21-year-old art student named William Ahern. Crean noticed that Ahern was in trouble and together with a young solicitor named Leachman from Dundrum, he managed to bring him ashore. For his bravery, he was awarded a medal by the Royal Humane Society.

The decline in the use of the baths started in the 1960s when indoor heated swimming pools started to appear. Dún Laoghaire Corporation closed the Blackrock Baths in the late 1980s and by 1992, due to lack of maintenance, parts of the baths were dismantled. They have since been sold to developers Treasury Holdings. In 2013, the baths were demolished due to safety concerns following a routine inspection by Dún Laoghaire–Rathdown County Council. It was found that the diving platform had been significantly corroded and detached from the pool base.

== Location and access ==
Blackrock covers a large but not precisely defined area, rising from sea level on the coast to 90 metres (300 ft) at White's Cross on the N11 national primary road. Blackrock is bordered by Booterstown, Mount Merrion, Stillorgan, Foxrock, Deansgrange and Monkstown.

=== Transport ===
Blackrock has a station on the Dublin Area Rapid Transit (DART) line, which is 15 minutes away by train from the city centre. The DART runs on the same track that was built in 1834 for the Dublin and Kingstown Railway. Blackrock railway station, on both the DART and the mainline South Eastern Commuter railway line, opened on 17 December 1834 and is the oldest station in Ireland. Blackrock was formerly served by the Dublin tramways routes 6, 7 and 8 and was the terminus for the former. The tram lines ceased operations on 9 July 1949 and today the nearest tram is the Luas green line with stops at Sandyford and Stillorgan.

Bus services operated by Dublin Bus and Go-Ahead Ireland also serve the area with multiple bus routes. These are routes 4, 7/A/D, 17/C/D, 46E, 84/A, 114 and 7N. The Aircoach services to Dublin Airport from Dalkey and Greystones call at Blackrock en route to the airport.

The Blackrock bypass was built in the late 1980s and officially opened by Councillor Anne Brady on 24 March 1988. The bypass is part of the N31 which joins the harbour at Dún Laoghaire to the national Primary Route network.

== Commerce ==
=== Retail ===
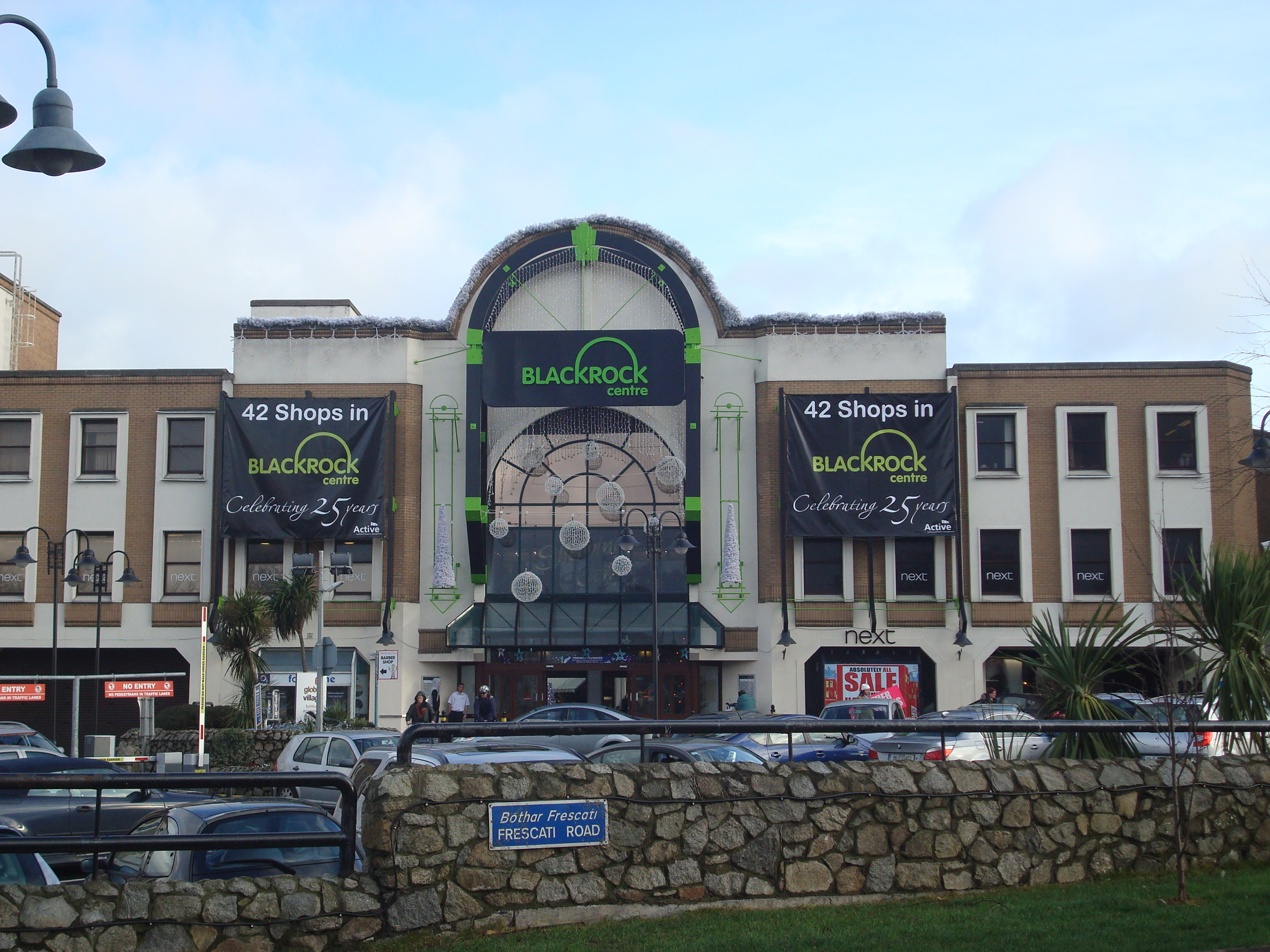
Blackrock Shopping Centre

Blackrock is a commercial centre for the surrounding area, and has several cafes, restaurants, off licences, clothes shops, hairdressers and barbers, pharmacies, supermarkets, art galleries, antiques and home improvements outlets as well as bars and banks.

Blackrock Shopping Centre was built in 1984 by Superquinn who managed the development and were the anchor store; Superquinn has since become part of Supervalu. Across the road is the area's other shopping centre, Frascati.

Blackrock Market was established in 1986 through 19A Main Street and contains 30 independent stallholders. In addition, there are a number of foods stalls and several restaurants. The market is open Saturday, Sunday and bank holidays, with several stalls and restaurants also operating during the week.

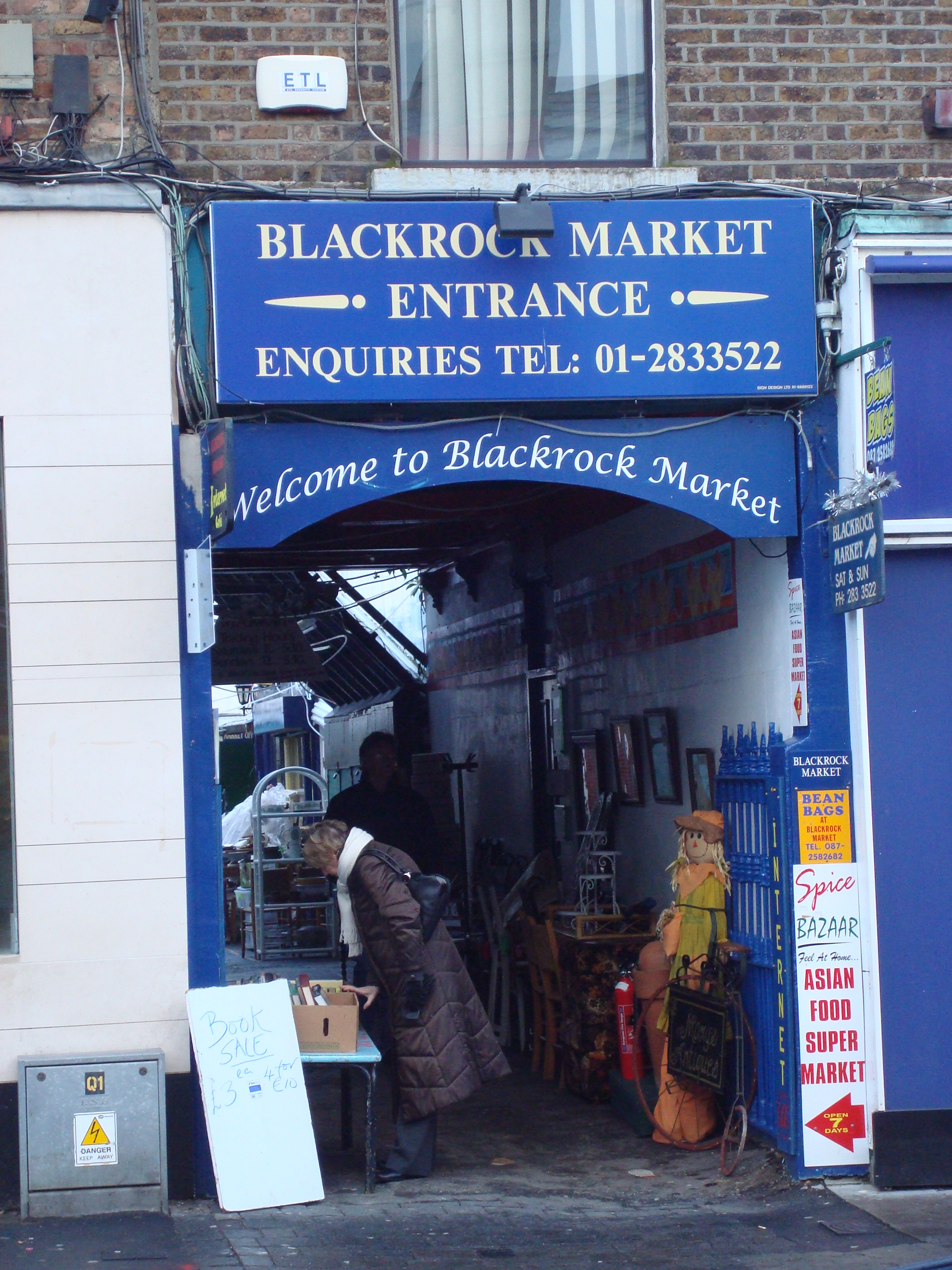
Blackrock Market entrance

Blackrock Clinic, a private clinic in Williamstown, was built on the site of Rosefield House.

=== Enterprise and community ===
The area is home to several industries, including in the IT and service areas.

In April 2010, a new business organisation for the area was formed. It is known as the Blackrock Business Network (BBN). In 2016, the BBN ran the "Leprechaun Chase", a fun-run event for the local community which took place on Saint Patrick's Day.

== Demographics ==
The population of all electoral divisions labelled as Blackrock was 31,152 as of the 2022 census but this does include areas beyond what is usually defined as Blackrock.

== Education ==
=== Primary schools ===
- Benincasa, Mount Merrion Avenue (Roman Catholic)
- Carysfort National School, Convent Road (Roman Catholic)
- Guardian Angels, Newtownpark Avenue (Roman Catholic)
- International School of Dublin, Temple Road (non-denominational)
- Willow Park, Rock Road (Roman Catholic)
- St. Augustine's, Obelisk Park (Roman Catholic)
- All Saints, Carysfort Avenue (Church of Ireland)
- Booterstown National School, Cross Avenue (Church of Ireland)
- Our Lady of Mercy National School, Rosemount Avenue (Roman Catholic)

=== Secondary schools ===
- Blackrock College, Rock Road (Roman Catholic)
- Blackrock Educate Together Secondary School, Newtownpark Avenue
- Dominican College Sion Hill, Cross Avenue (Roman Catholic)
- Newpark Comprehensive School, Newtownpark Avenue (Church of Ireland) (the campus includes Newpark Music School, which in turn includes a jazz school
- Rosemont Secondary School, Temple Road (Roman Catholic)
- St. Andrew's College, Booterstown Avenue (Inter-Denominational)

=== Third level ===
- Carysfort College was a large teacher training college in the area until its closure in 1988
- Michael Smurfit Graduate School of Business is a business school of UCD that occupies the old buildings of Carysfort College
- Froebel College of Education, Cross Avenue was one of the 5 major Teacher Training Colleges in Ireland; it moved to the NUI Maynooth campus in 2013
- City College Dublin, Carysfort Avenue and UCD Blackrock Campus, specialises in the provision of a range of childcare and healthcare courses.
- Blackrock Further Education Institute, located in the centre of Blackrock since 2015, following a re-location of Senior College Dun Laoghaire

== Climate ==
Blackrock has an oceanic climate (Köppen: Cfb).

Climate data for Blackrock
Month	Jan	Feb	Mar	Apr	May	Jun	Jul	Aug	Sep	Oct	Nov	Dec	Year
Mean daily maximum °C (°F)	7.4 (45.3)	7.9 (46.2)	9.1 (48.4)	11.1 (52.0)	14.0 (57.2)	16.6 (61.9)	18.0 (64.4)	17.8 (64.0)	16.2 (61.2)	13.2 (55.8)	9.8 (49.6)	7.9 (46.2)	12.4 (54.4)
Daily mean °C (°F)	5.4 (41.7)	5.6 (42.1)	6.5 (43.7)	8.3 (46.9)	11.0 (51.8)	13.7 (56.7)	15.2 (59.4)	15.0 (59.0)	13.4 (56.1)	10.8 (51.4)	7.7 (45.9)	6.0 (42.8)	9.9 (49.8)
Mean daily minimum °C (°F)	3.3 (37.9)	3.3 (37.9)	3.8 (38.8)	5.4 (41.7)	8.0 (46.4)	10.6 (51.1)	12.4 (54.3)	12.3 (54.1)	10.6 (51.1)	8.4 (47.1)	5.5 (41.9)	3.9 (39.0)	7.3 (45.1)
Average precipitation mm (inches)	64.0 (2.52)	59.4 (2.34)	59.4 (2.34)	61.1 (2.41)	73.5 (2.89)	73.2 (2.88)	83.0 (3.27)	82.6 (3.25)	72.4 (2.85)	89.8 (3.54)	85.8 (3.38)	76.6 (3.02)	880.8 (34.69)
Source: Weather.Directory

== Religion ==
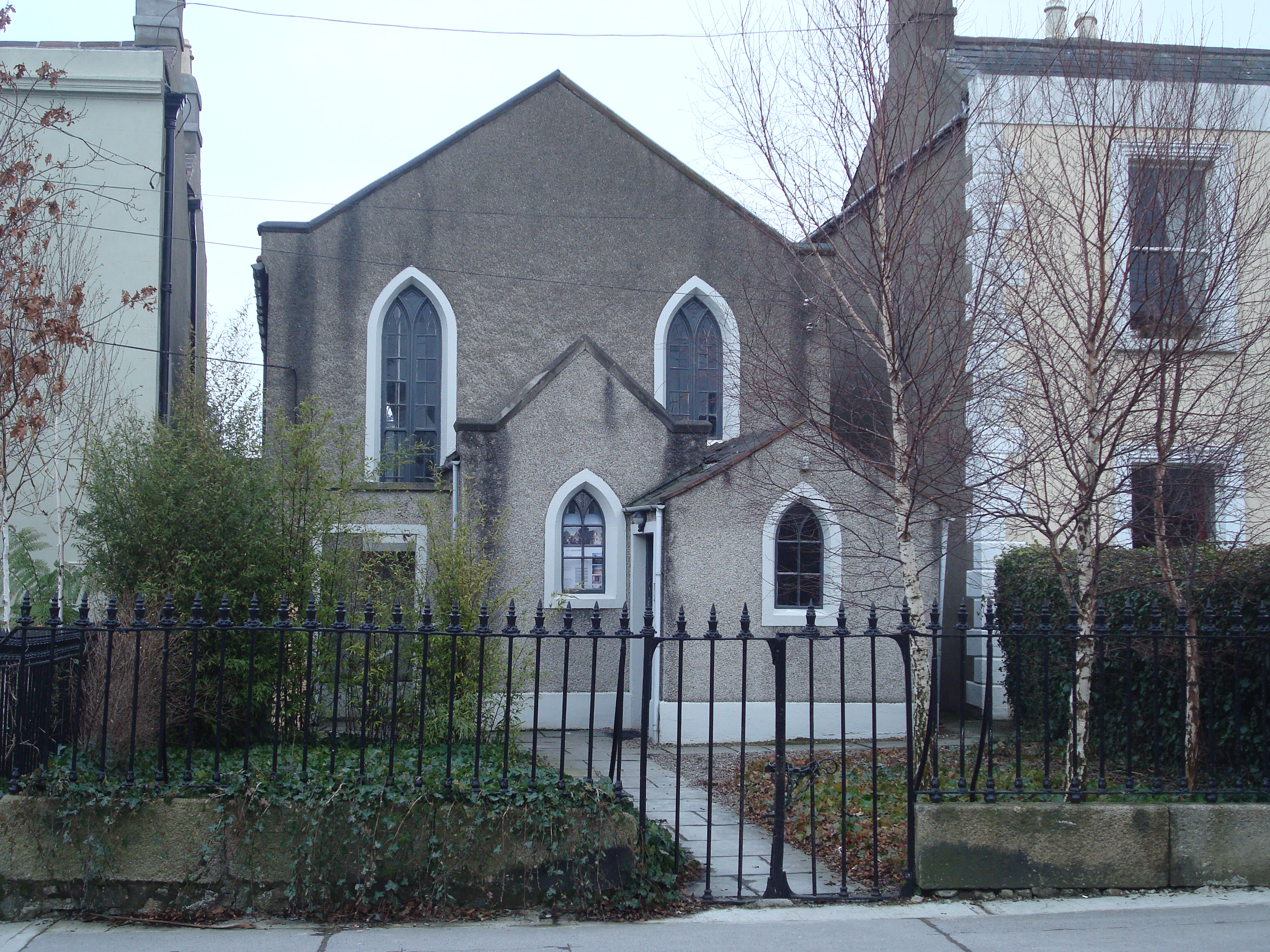
Old Methodist church on Georges Avenue

Churches in the area include:

- All Saints, Carysfort Avenue (Church of Ireland)
- Blackrock Methodist Church/Ignite, Main St
- Church of the Guardian Angels, Newtownpark Avenue (Roman Catholic)
- St. Andrew's, Mount Merrion Avenue (Presbyterian)
- St. John the Baptist, Blackrock (Roman Catholic)
- St. Philip and St. James, Cross Avenue, (Church of Ireland)
- Blackrock Community Church (Association of Baptist Churches in Ireland, ABCI)

== People ==
- John Adlercron was Commander-in-Chief, India in 1754. Stayed and died in Blackrock in 1766.
- Lord Edward FitzGerald (1763–1798) was born in Frescati House. An Irish aristocrat and revolutionary, he was one of the commanders in the Irish Rebellion of 1798.
- Valentine Lawless (1773–1853) the second Baron Cloncurry, was an Irish politician and landowner who had a summer residence in Blackrock called Maretimo.
- Patrick Byrne (1783–1864) lived at 3 Waltham Terrace from 1855. He the architect of several churches in Dublin, including the local Catholic parish church, St. John the Baptist.
- James Stephens (1825–1901) at one time lived at 82 George's Avenue, Blackrock and was a founding member of the Irish Republican Brotherhood.
- Charles Kickham (1828–1882) lived at James O'Connors former house of 2 Montpelier Place, off Temple Hill. He was a novelist, poet, journalist and a member of the Irish Republican Brotherhood.
- Lieutenant General Harry Hammon Lyster (1830–1922) was born in Blackrock and was an Anglo-Irish recipient of the Victoria Cross.
- William Edward Hartpole Lecky (1838–1903) was an Irish historian and publicist born in Newtown Park.
- John Boyd Dunlop (1840–1921) lived in a large 18th-century house called South Hill and developed the first practical pneumatic or inflatable tyre.
- Sir William Orpen (1878–1931) lived in a house called Oriel on Grove Avenue, just off Mount Merrion Avenue. He was a portrait painter and official war artist in the First World War.
- Maurice Walsh (1879–1964), writer, lived on both Stillorgan Park Avenue and Avoca Road in Blackrock. He is best known for his short story 'The Quiet Man'.
- Éamon de Valera (1882–1975) lived in a few houses in the area including Bellevue on Cross Avenue 1933–1940. He was educated at Blackrock College and later taught there and at Our Lady of Mercy College, Carysfort. He retired to Linden Convalescent Home after his presidential term ended in 1973 and died there on 29 August 1975.
- James Joyce (1882–1941), the writer, lived at 23 Carysfort Avenue known as Leoville for one year in the early 1890s. This house is still extant. In his book A Portrait of the Artist as a Young Man he makes reference to the local parish church St. John the Baptist.
- Kevin O'Higgins (1892–1927) rented Lisaniskea ("Lios na Uisce"), near Blackrock, in 1923–1925. He later moved to Dunamase on Cross Avenue and was the Minister for Justice in the Government of the Irish Free State. He was assassinated on the Booterstown end of Cross Avenue on his way to mass at his local parish church on 10 July 1927 by members of the IRA.
- Brian O'Nolan (1911–1966) lived at 4 Avoca Terrace and later at 81 Merrion Avenue. He was an Irish novelist and satirist who wrote under the nom de plume Flann O'Brien.
- Cecil King (1921–1986), the abstract painter, lived for many years on Idrone Terrace, and one of his paintings is entitled Idrone.
- George Thomas Stokes (1843–1898) was an Irish ecclesiastical historian and Church of Ireland clergyman. In 1868, he was nominated first vicar of the newly constituted charge of All Saints, Newtown Park, County Dublin, which he held till his death.
- Reginald Gray, the portrait painter, was born in Blackrock in 1930. He lived for 27 years at 10 Avoca Place and was a near neighbour of the artist Seán O'Sullivan. He lived most of his life in France.
- Rowan Gillespie is an Irish bronze casting sculptor who created the "Blackrock Dolmen" sculpture in Blackrock. He works out of Blackrock with a purpose-built bronze casting foundry in a house called Clonlea.
- Eoin Dillon, uilleann piper of Kila, was brought up in the Blackrock area and lived in Hollypark.
- Fergus Martin, artist, lived for much of his childhood (1962–1970) in Prince Edward Terrace, Carysfort Avenue.
- Frank Kelly, the actor known for playing Father Jack on the television comedy series Father Ted, was born and lived for most of his life in Blackrock.
- Sarah Maud Heckford (1839–1903), a travel writer and hospital founder, was born in Blackrock.
- William Payne-Gallwey, first-class cricketer and British Army officer, was born in Blackrock.

== Gallery ==
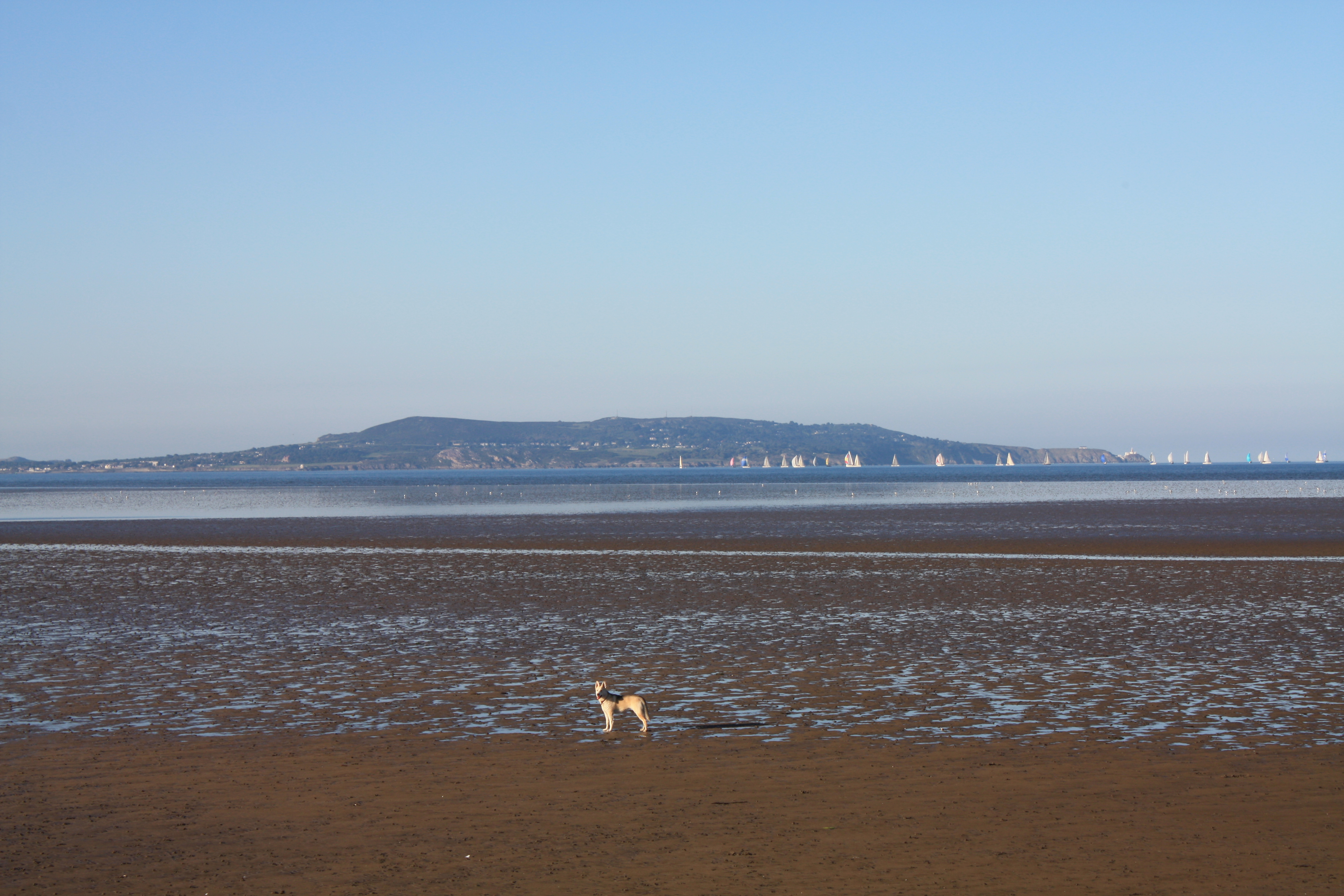
View from Blackrock Park across Dublin Bay to Howth

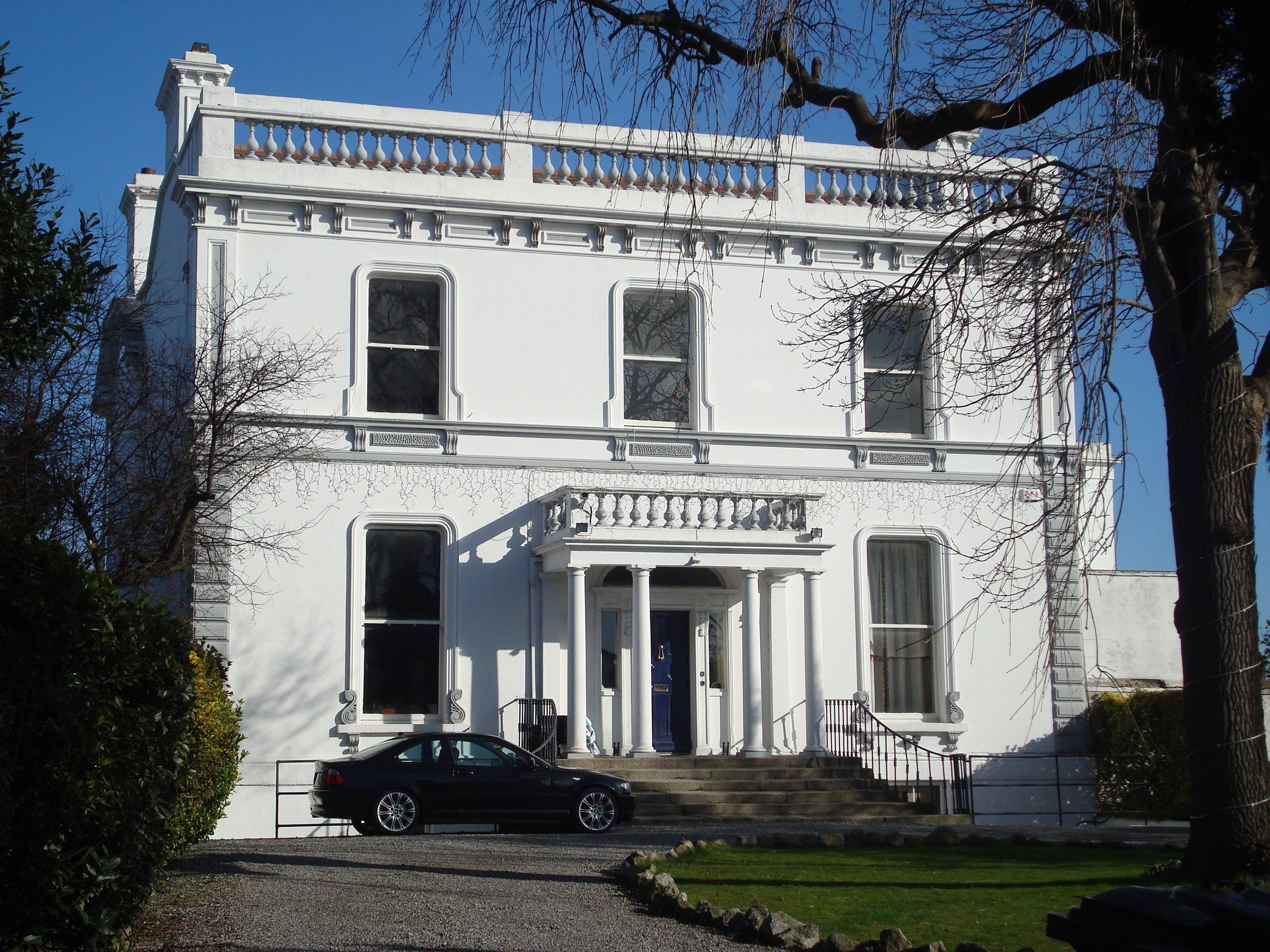
Newtown House in Blackrock

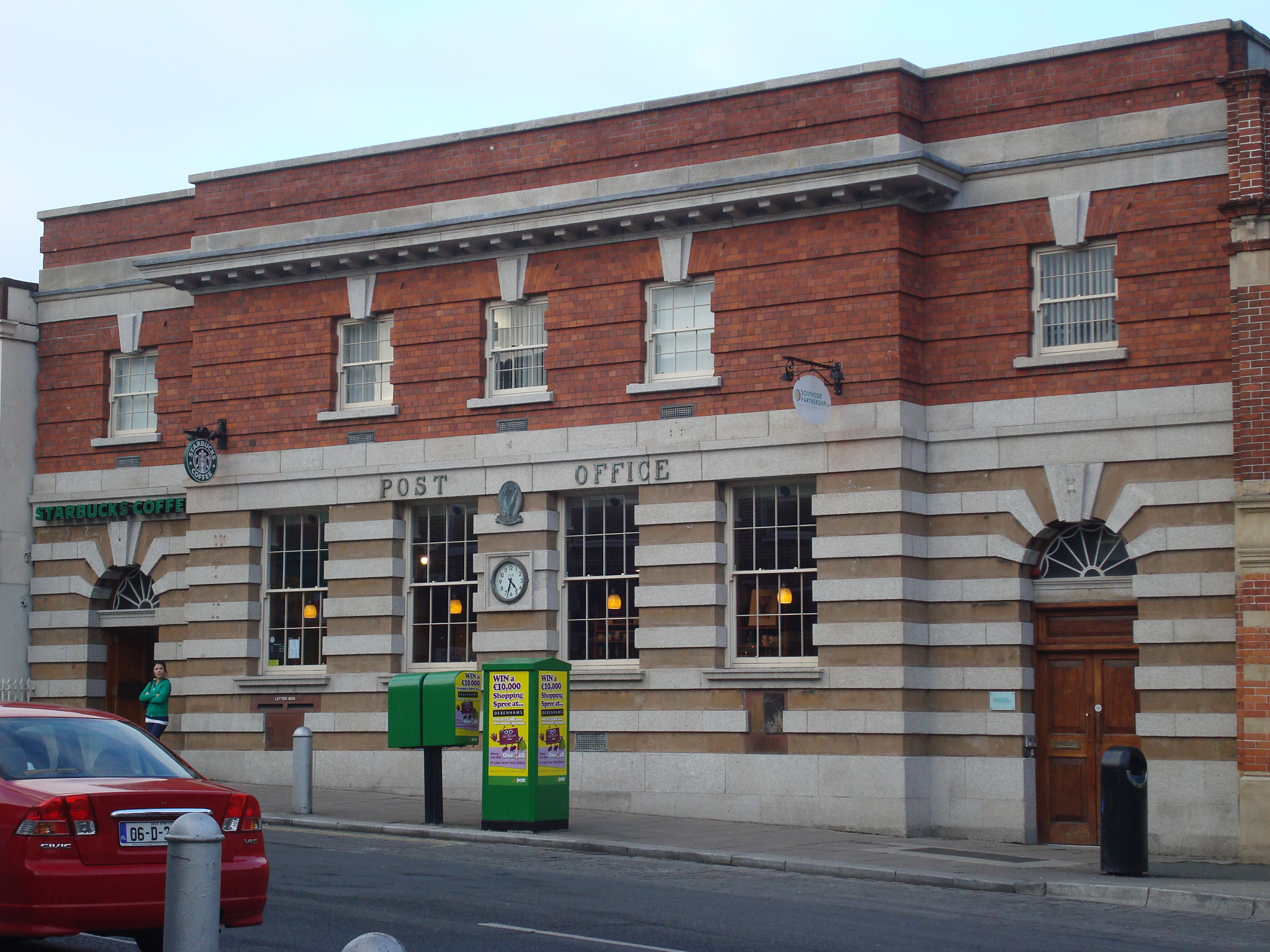
The old post office building

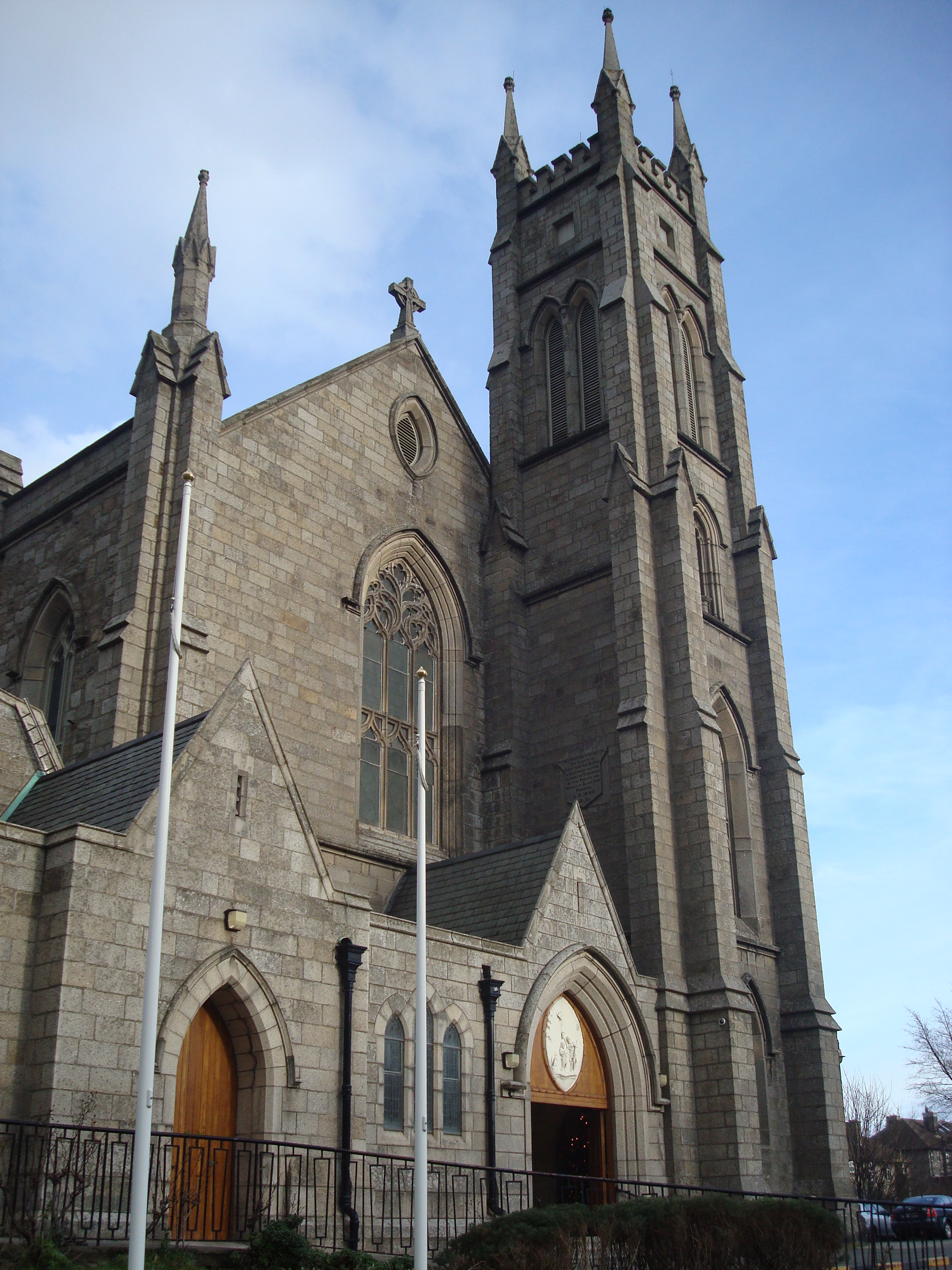
St. John The Baptist church

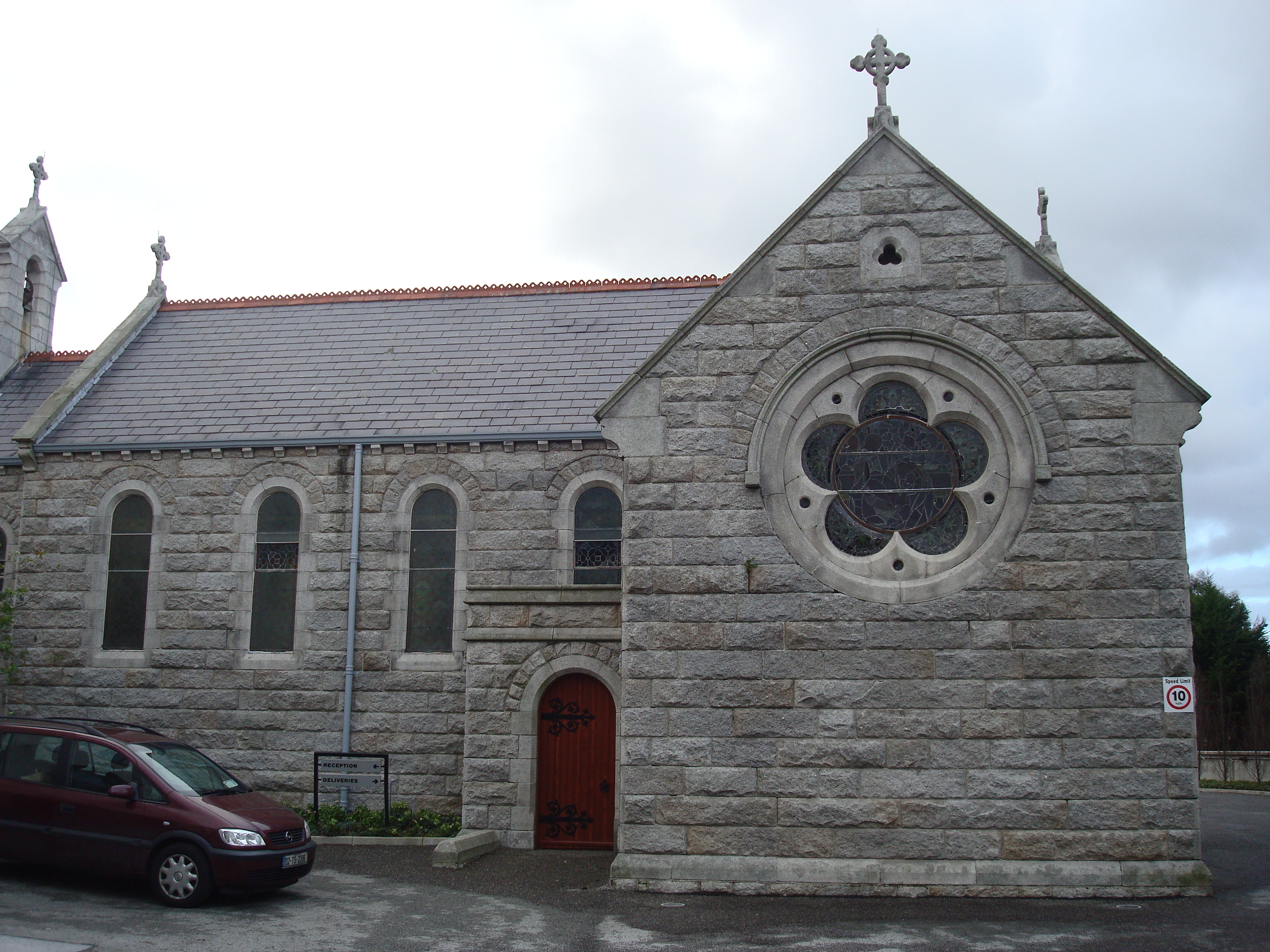
Our Lady's Hospice, Blackrock Chapel

== See also ==
- List of towns and villages in Ireland
- Black Rock, Victoria
