= Ballyeaston =

Village in County Antrim, Northern Ireland

Coordinates: 54°46′N 6°00′W

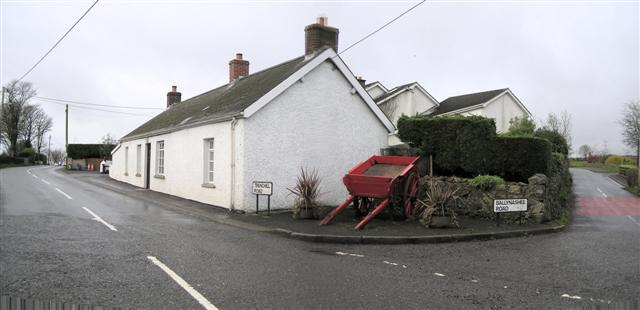
The corner of Trenchill Road and Ballynashee Road

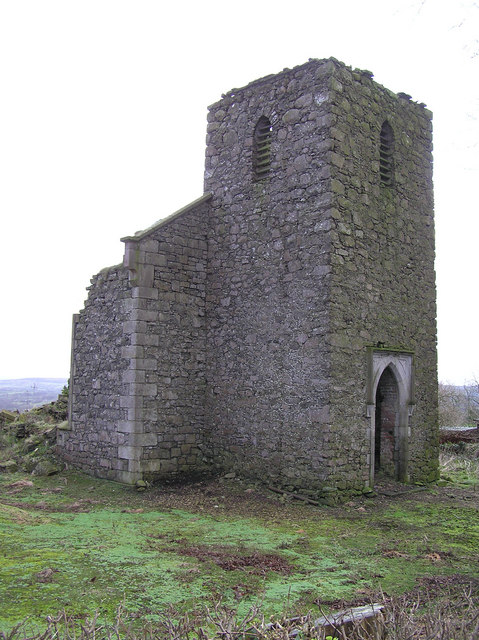
Ballyeaston old church

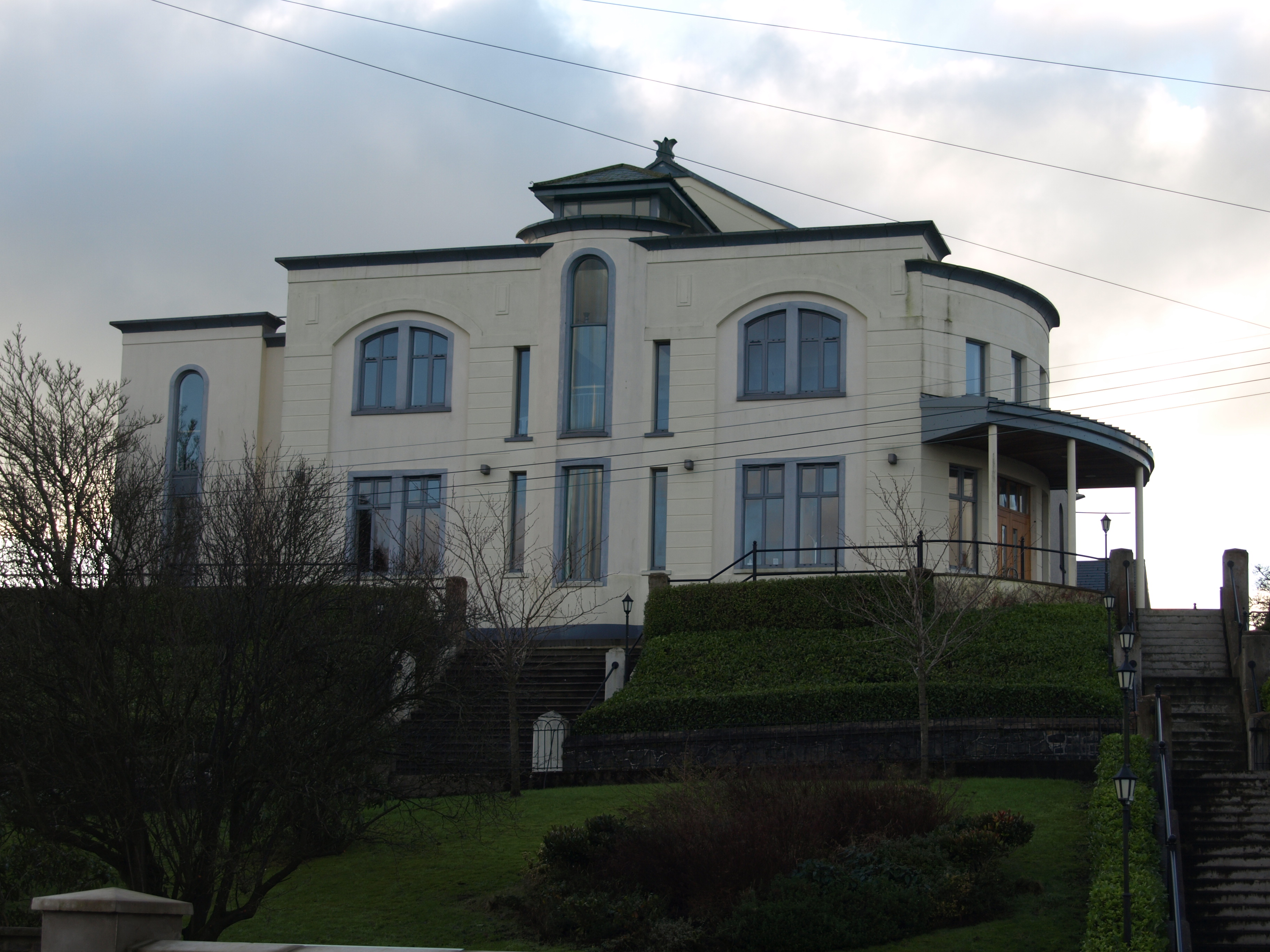
1st Ballyeaston Presbyterian Church

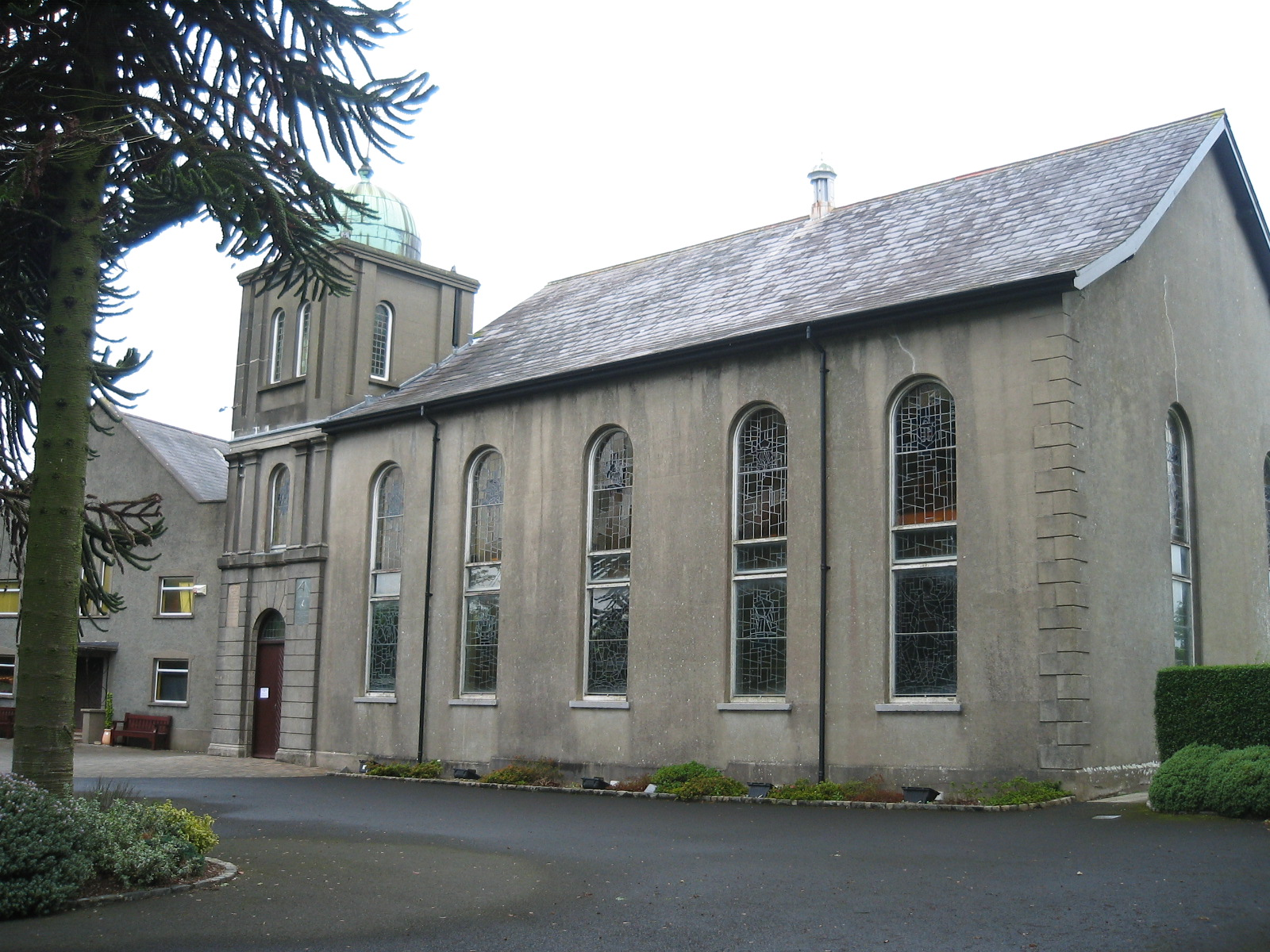
2nd Ballyeaston Presbyterian Church is situated on the Trenchill Road

Ballyeaston, formerly spelt Ballyistin (from Irish Baile Uistín, meaning 'Uistín's townland'), is a small village and townland in County Antrim, Northern Ireland. It is 2–3 km north of Ballyclare, on the road to Larne. It lies on the southern hill slopes overlooking Six Mile Water. In the 2001 census it had a population of 90 people. It is within the Antrim & Newtownabbey Borough Council area.

The village is centred on a junction of three main routes that meet near a medieval parish church. Its buildings cluster between the landmark churches, with the modern facade of First Ballyeaston Presbyterian Church and the bronze cupola of Second Ballyeaston Presbyterian Church.

The Boy's Brigade Company belongs to 2nd Ballyeaston while the Girl's Brigade belongs to 1st Ballyeaston and boys and girls from both churches attend each.

At the time of the 1859 Ulster revival, the minister of 2nd Ballyeaston was Rev A. Pollock. Reference books state that the revival hit the parish with such power, he died as a result of his strenuous labours. He is buried in the small graveyard behind the church and the inscription on his headstone says that he died in the field with his armour on.

In the middle of the village is a group of buildings on both sides of the Trenchill Road, a steep and winding road, which forms the village's main street. At the top of the main street is the old Ballyeaston Flute Band Hall.
