= St. Andrew's, Blackrock =

St. Andrew's
- St. Andrew's, Blackrock
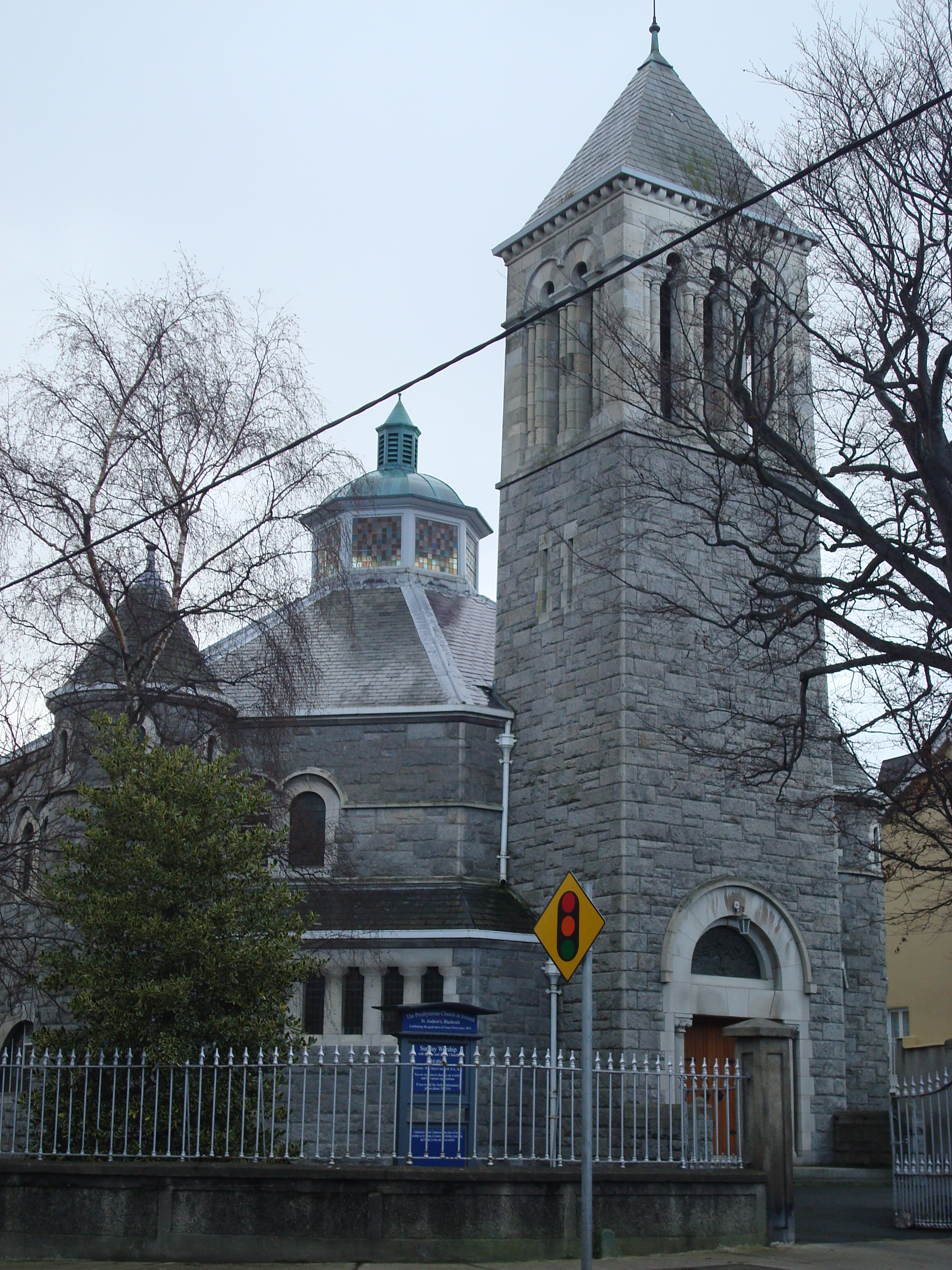
- St. Andrew's
- 53.301567°N 6.184525°W
- Location: Blackrock, Dublin
- Country: Ireland
- Denomination: Presbyterian Church of Ireland
- Website: standrewsblackrockpc.org

History
- Former name: Blackrock Presbyterian Church
- Founded: 1895
- Dedicated: 5 February 1899

Architecture
- Architect(s): Messrs, Murray and Forrester

Administration
- Parish: Blackrock

St. Andrew's, Blackrock is a Presbyterian church on Mount Merrion Avenue, Blackrock, Dublin. The Blackrock parish was established in 1895 and the church was opened in 1899. Its sister church is St. Andrew's of Bray.

== History ==
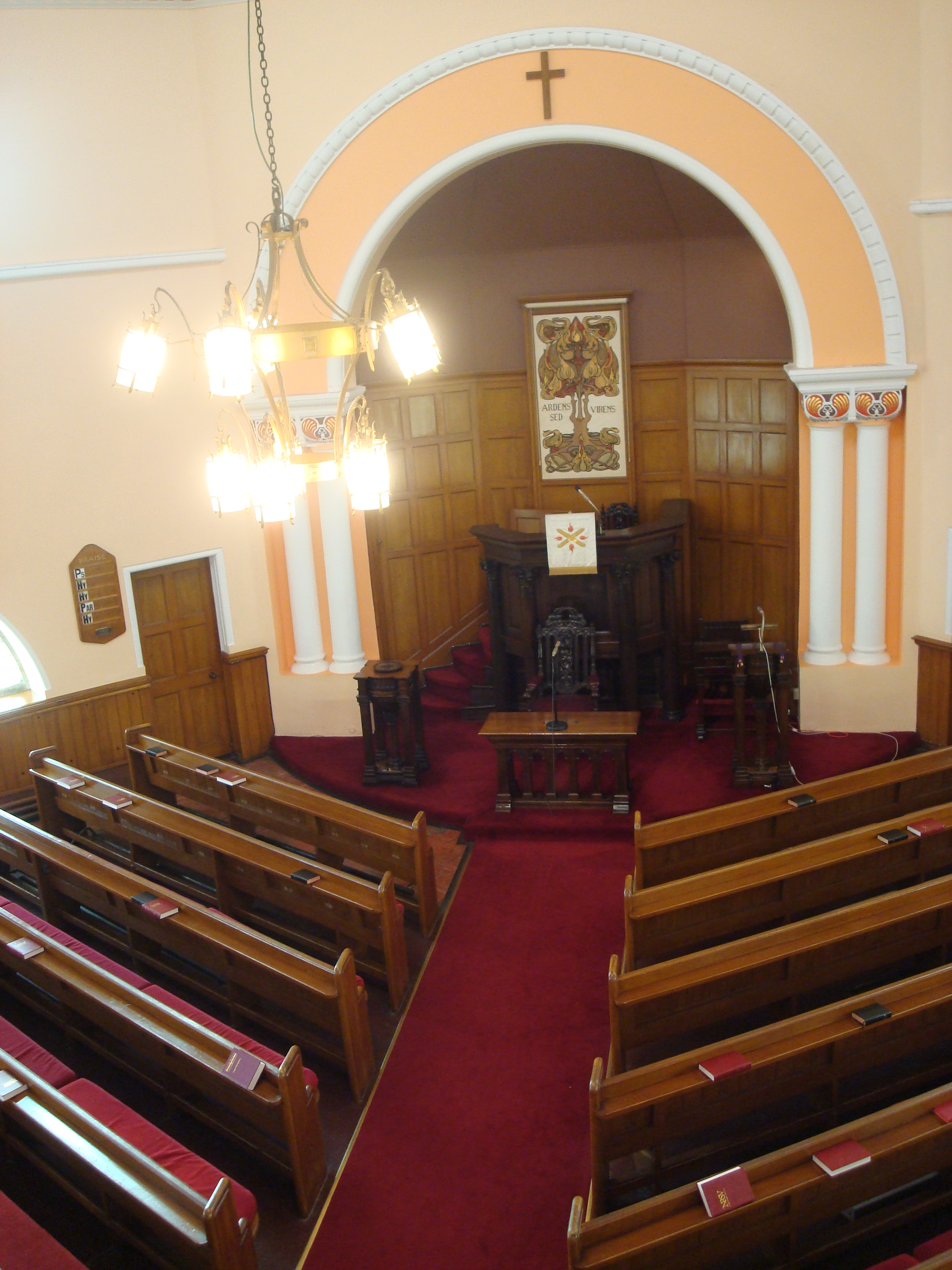
Inside St. Andrew's

A Presbyterian congregation started meeting in Blackrock Town Hall from 29 July 1894. It was 1895 when the parish of Blackrock Presbyterian Church was formed and plans were set forth to build a church.

The congregation decided to buy Albion House on Mount Merrion Avenue around November 1895 for £750. They raised £304 towards building and William Hewat, a local Blackrock member of the congregation, suggested the church be named St. Andrew's and later donated £800 enabling the purchase of Albion House in March 1896.

The architects Messrs, Murray and Forrester were commissioned and the builder Patrick Caufield of Booterstown was chosen. The foundation stone of the church was laid on 27 October 1898 and the church was opened with its first service on 5 February 1899. The building is designed in an octagonal shape fronted by a large tower containing the main entrance.

The church organ was installed in 1912 with half of the money donated by Andrew Carnegie (a Scottish-American industrialist, businessman, entrepreneur and a major philanthropist). His conditions for donating the money were simple. Once the congregation had raised half of the £900 required, he would donate the rest.

Under the ministry of Rev. Desmond Black a new hall was built and opened on 5 December 1959 to a cost of £15,000. The hall was opened by Mrs. Scott McLeod, the wife of the United States Ambassador to Ireland at the time, and dedicated by Rt. Rev. Thomas Alexander Byers Smyth, the Moderator of the General Assembly.

== Ministers ==
Rev. James Snowdon (minister 1895–1936).

Rev. James Noel Thompson (minister 1936–1956).

Rev. Albert Desmond Pattison Black (minister 1957–1986).

Rev. George Denis Campbell (minister 1986–2018).

Rev. Andrew Gill (minister 2020–present)

== See also ==
- St. Andrew's College, Booterstown
