= Second Ballyeaston Presbyterian Church =

Church building in Ireland

Coordinates: 54.772°N 6.004°W

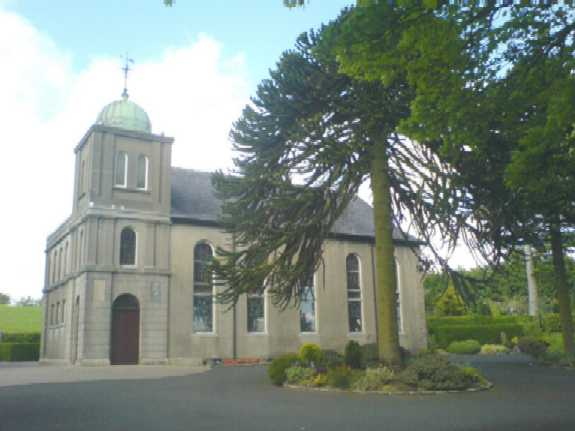
Second Ballyeaston Presbyterian Church

Second Ballyeaston Presbyterian Church is a church building of the Presbyterian Church in Ireland. It is located in the village of Ballyeaston, in the Six Mile Valley, just two miles north-east of Ballyclare in County Antrim, Northern Ireland.

== History ==
The congregation was established in 1763 at Rashee, close to the present building, moving to the current site in 1768. Originally a Seceding congregation, Rashee became known as Second Ballyeaston Presbyterian Church in 1846 when it joined the General Assembly of the Presbyterian Church in Ireland.

During the troublesome times prior to the 1798 Rebellion led by the United Irishmen, the congregation's minister, the Reverend William Holmes, an opponent of the rebel cause, formed and drilled The Ballyeaston Yeomanry. The field in which they paraded became known as "The Parade", and the current manse, known as "Parade Manse", was built there in 1907. William Holmes was also responsible for informing state authorities of the location of rebel forces hiding at Glenwherry in June 1798, but they were saved from capture by being warned by another local man, John Magil. Despite Holmes's opposition to the United Irishmen, many Presbyterians and their neighbours supported the rebel cause.

== Church architecture ==
The church building features a tower with a bronze cupola, an unusual feature in Irish Presbyterian architecture. Built originally in the 'barn' style of Presbyterian Churches, a plain style not unlike that of a large barn, the entrance porch and tower were added in 1901 during a major refurbishment in which the pulpit was moved to the east wall and a gallery added.

== Ministers ==
There have been 10 ministers in the congregation's 243-year history: Revd Anderson (1763-1768), Revd William Holmes (1768-1813), Revd J. Wright (1813-1842), Revd A. Pollock (1842-1859), Revd A. B. Porter (1860-1901), Revd W. Brann (1901-1941), Revd James Coulter (1941-1965), Revd Robert A. Boyd (1966-1990), Revd Purvis Campbell (1990-2005), Revd Christopher Glover (2006–present).
