= List of Catholic churches in Ireland =

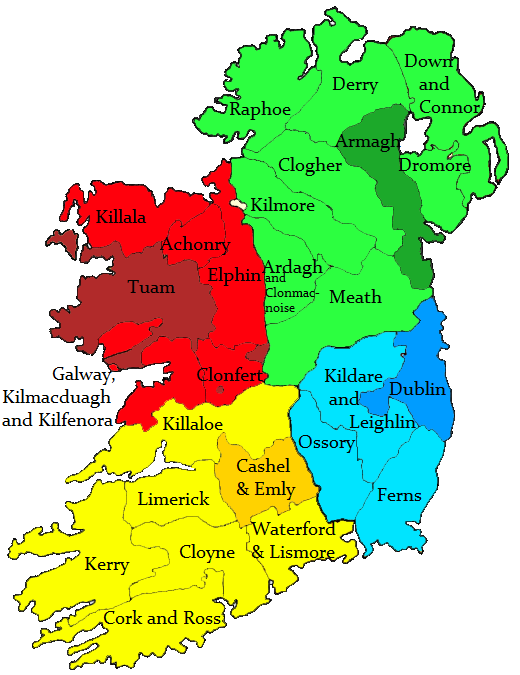
Catholic dioceses of Ireland

A list of Catholic churches in Ireland, notable current and former individual church buildings and congregations and administration of the Catholic Church in Ireland. These churches are listed buildings or have been recognised for their historical importance, or are church congregations notable for reasons unrelated to their buildings.

== Churches ==
Sorted according to the counties of Ireland, with reference to the Catholic dioceses, which are in the ecclesiastical provinces of Armagh, Cashel, Dublin, and Tuam.

=== Antrim ===
In the Diocese of Down and Connor:

- St Peter's Cathedral, Belfast
- Holy Cross Church, Ardoyne
- Clonard Monastery
- St Malachy's Church, Belfast
- St Mary's Church, Belfast
- St Patrick's Church, Belfast

=== Armagh ===
In the Archdiocese of Armagh:

- St Patrick's Cathedral, Armagh

St Mary's Church, Mullaghbawn

=== Carlow ===
In the Diocese of Kildare and Leighlin:

- Cathedral of the Assumption, Carlow

=== Cavan ===
In the Diocese of Kilmore:

- Cavan Cathedral
- St Aidan's Church, Butlersbridge

=== Clare ===
In the Diocese of Killaloe:

- Ennis Cathedral

In the Diocese of Galway, Kilmacduagh and Kilfenora:

- St. Fachanan, Kilfenora

In the Diocese of Limerick:

- Church of St. John, Cratloe

=== Cork ===
In the Diocese of Cork and Ross:

- Cathedral of St Mary and St Anne
- Church of St Mary and St John, Ballincollig
- Holy Trinity Church, Cork (Capuchins)
- Honan Chapel
- Saints Peter and Paul's Church, Cork
- St. Mary's Dominican Church and Priory
- St. Patrick's Cathedral, Skibbereen

In the Diocese of Cloyne:

- St Colman's Cathedral, Cobh

=== Donegal ===
In the Diocese of Raphoe:

- Cathedral of St Eunan and St Columba
- Church of the Irish Martyrs, Letterkenny
- St Columba's Church, Burtonport
- St Columba's Church, Glenswilly

In the Diocese of Clogher:

- St Patrick's Purgatory

=== Down ===
In the Diocese of Dromore:

- Newry Cathedral

=== Dublin ===
In the Archdiocese of Dublin:

- St Mary's Cathedral
- Chapel Royal, Dublin
- Church of Our Lady of the Assumption, Ballyfermot
- Church of the Assumption, Booterstown
- Church of the Assumption, Howth
- Church of the Immaculate Conception, Dublin (Franciscan)
- Saint Francis Xavier Church, Dublin (Jesuit)
- John's Lane Church
- Mary Immaculate, Refuge of Sinners Church
- Newman University Church
- St. Assam's Church
- St Audoen's Church, Dublin
- St Andrew's Church, Westland Row, Dublin
- St James' Church, Dublin
- St Mary's Church, Haddington Road, Dublin
- St Peter's Church, Phibsborough, Dublin
- St Catherine's Church, Dublin
- St. John the Baptist, Blackrock
- St. Joseph's Carmelite Church, Berkeley Road
- St. Joseph's Church, East Wall
- St. Kevin's Church, Harrington Street, Dublin
- St. Michan's Catholic Church, Dublin
- Church of St Nicholas of Myra Without
- St. Patrick's Church, Ringsend
- St. Paul's Church, Dublin
- Whitefriar Street Carmelite Church

=== Fermanagh ===
In the Diocese of Clogher:

- St. Mary's Chapel, Maguiresbridge

=== Galway ===
In the Diocese of Galway, Kilmacduagh and Kilfenora:

- Cathedral of Our Lady Assumed into Heaven and St Nicholas, Galway
- St Ignatius Church, Galway (Jesuit)
- Kylemore Abbey (Benedictine)

In the Archdiocese of Tuam:

- Cathedral of the Assumption of the Blessed Virgin Mary, Tuam

In the Diocese of Clonfert:

- St Brendan's Cathedral, Loughrea
- St. Michael's Church, Ballinasloe
- St Francis Church, Meelick

=== Kerry ===
In the Diocese of Kerry:

- St Mary's Cathedral, Killarney

=== Kildare ===
In the Diocese of Kildare and Leighlin:

- St. Anne's Church, Ardclough

In the Archdiocese of Dublin:

- St. Brigid's Church, Straffan

=== Kilkenny ===
In the Diocese of Ossory:

- St Mary's Cathedral, Kilkenny
- Black Abbey (Dominicans)
- Church of Saint John the Evangelist, Kilkenny

In the Diocese of Kildare and Leighlin:

- Duiske Abbey Graiguenamanagh

=== Leitrim ===
In the Diocese of Ardagh and Clonmacnoise:

- Costello Chapel

=== Limerick ===
In the Diocese of Limerick:

- St John's Cathedral (Limerick)
- Trinitarian Abbey, Adare

=== Derry ===
In the Diocese of Derry:

- St Eugene's Cathedral
- St Columba's Church, Long Tower
- St. Mary's Church, Bellaghy

=== Longford ===
In the Diocese of Ardagh and Clonmacnoise:

- St Mel's Cathedral

=== Louth ===
In the Archdiocese of Armagh:

- St. Peter's Roman Catholic Church, Drogheda
- St. Patrick's Church, Dundalk

=== Mayo ===
In the Archdiocese of Tuam:

- Knock Shrine
- Ballintubber Abbey
- St Colman's Church, Claremorris

In the Diocese of Killala:

- St Muredach's Cathedral, Ballina

=== Meath ===
In the Diocese of Meath:

- Silverstream Priory (Benedictine)
- St Mary's Church, Navan

=== Roscommon ===
In the Diocese of Achonry:

- Cathedral of the Annunciation of the Blessed Virgin Mary and St Nathy, Ballaghaderreen

In the Diocese of Elphin:

- Sacred Heart Church, Roscommon

=== Sligo ===
In the Diocese of Elphin:

- Cathedral of the Immaculate Conception, Sligo

=== Tipperary ===
In the Archdiocese of Cashel and Emly:

- Cathedral of the Assumption, Thurles
- St Ailbe's Church, Emly
- Holycross Abbey
- Augustinian Abbey, Fethard

In the Diocese of Killaloe:

- St. Cronan's Church, Roscrea

=== Tyrone ===
In the Diocese of Derry:

- Sacred Heart Church, Plumbridge

=== Waterford ===
In the Diocese of Waterford and Lismore:

- Cathedral of the Most Holy Trinity, Waterford
- St Patrick's Catholic Church, Waterford
- St Carthage's Church, Lismore
- Church of the Immaculate Conception, Tallow

=== Westmeath ===
In the Diocese of Meath:

- Cathedral of Christ the King, Mullingar
- St Paul's Church, Mullingar

In the Archdiocese of Tuam:

- Church of Saints Peter and Paul, Athlone

In the Diocese of Ardagh and Clonmacnoise:

- Multyfarnham Friary

=== Wexford ===
In the Diocese of Ferns:

- St. Aidan's Cathedral

=== Wicklow ===
In the Archdiocese of Dublin:

- Holy Redeemer Church, Bray

== See also ==
- List of basilicas in Ireland
- List of monastic houses in Ireland
