= St. Audoen's Church, Dublin =

St. Audoen's Church, Dublin may refer to:

- St. Audoen's Church, Dublin (Church of Ireland)
- St Audoen's Church, Dublin (Roman Catholic)
