= Manus Kelly =

Irish rally driver, businessman, and politician (1978–2019)

- Nationality: (Republic of Ireland) Irish
- Born: 9 February 1978 Letterkenny, County Donegal, Ireland
- Died: 23 June 2019 (aged 41) Fanad Head, County Donegal, Ireland

Irish Tarmac Rally Championship career
- Co-driver: Donall Barrett

Championship titles
- 2016, 2017, 2018: Donegal International Rally

Manus Kelly (9 February 1978 – 23 June 2019) was an Irish rally driver, businessman, and Fianna Fáil politician from Glenswilly in County Donegal. Known as "Mandy", he won the Donegal International Rally three consecutive times, in 2016, 2017, and 2018. Elected in the 2019 local elections to serve on Donegal County Council, he died less than a month later, aged 41, while competing in the 2019 Donegal International Rally.

== Background and personal life ==
A native of Glenswilly, Manus Kelly was the son of Donal and Jacqueline Kelly; he had four brothers, Donal, Caolan, Teigharan and Leon, and four sisters, Breigeen, Kelda, Ciara and Shannagh. He was educated at Glenswilly National School and St Eunan's College. With his wife Bernie he had five children—three sons, Manus, Charlie, and Conan, and two daughters, Annie and Bella.

== Career ==
A driver in the Irish Tarmac Rally Championship, Kelly won the Donegal International Rally three consecutive times, in 2016, 2017, and 2018. He was also involved in coaching Gaelic football and led his local team Glenswilly to a Senior C Championship win in 2016.

Once employed as a porter at Letterkenny University Hospital, Kelly subsequently drove the "cancer bus" that took patients from Donegal to Dublin for cancer treatment. He later became a well-known local businessman, known as the proprietor of Uptown Café in Letterkenny and the founder and managing director of Tailored Facility Solutions, a Letterkenny-based company employing 60 people. He was also known as a road safety advocate in local schools and as a volunteer with Donegal Down Syndrome.

In the 2019 Donegal County Council election, Kelly stood as a Fianna Fáil candidate in the Letterkenny local electoral area. Endorsed by outgoing Fianna Fáil councillor and fellow sportsman James Pat McDaid, he received 906 first-preference votes and was elected to Donegal County Council on the ninth count. Following Kelly's death, his father, Donal Kelly Sr, was co-opted onto Donegal County Council to replace him. After Donal Kelly Sr retired in 2020, he was replaced on the council by Kelly's brother, Donal "Mandy" Kelly Jr, who was later elected in the 2024 Donegal County Council election, having attained 1,841 first-preference votes.

== Death ==
In the 2019 Donegal International Rally, Kelly drove a Hyundai i20 R5. On Sunday, 23 June, during Super Stage 15 on the Fanad Head loop, Kelly's car crashed through a hedge and into a field. Gardaí later confirmed that Kelly had died at the scene. Co-driver Donall Barrett, who was taken to Letterkenny University Hospital after suffering a broken shoulder, later called Kelly's death "an absolute freak", saying that the pair had been involved in many worse accidents without serious injury. The remaining stages of that year's Donegal International Rally were cancelled. Kelly was survived by his wife, five children, his parents, and his eight siblings.

Following Kelly's death, then-Taoiseach Leo Varadkar called him a "phenomenal motorsportsman". Fianna Fáil leader Micheál Martin called his death "an immeasurable loss to us all", while Minister of State for Tourism and Sport Brendan Griffin called him "a great ambassador for Irish motor sport". Motorsport Ireland and the Donegal Motor Club also paid tribute.

== Funeral ==
Around 700 mourners attended Kelly's funeral at St Columba's Church, Glenswilly on 27 June. The funeral cortège was led by the Subaru Impreza S12B WRC in which he had won the Donegal International Rally three times, driven by 2014 champion Declan Boyle, with Kelly's son Charlie in the passenger seat. Micheál Martin attended the funeral, as did Minister for Education and Skills Joe McHugh, while the Taoiseach was represented by his aide-de-camp. Following the funeral mass, Kelly's four brothers carried his coffin across the Donegal International Rally ramp. He was buried in Conwal Cemetery.
