= St. Paul's (Roman Catholic) Church, Dublin =

St Paul's
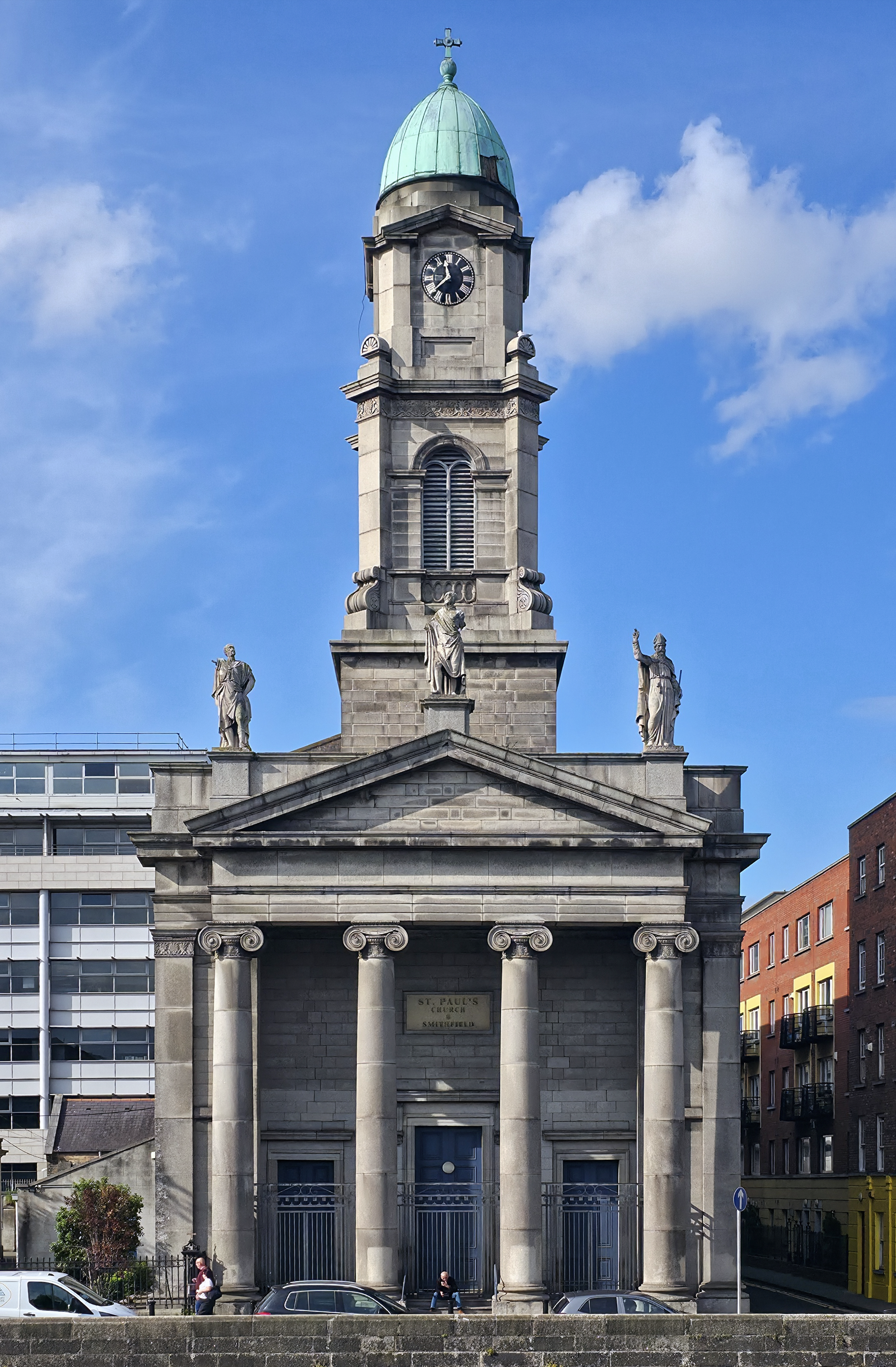
- St Paul's
- 53°20′47″N 6°16′39″W
- Location: Arran Quay; Dublin
- Country: Ireland
- Denomination: Roman Catholic

History
- Dedication: Saint Paul

Architecture
- Architect: Patrick Byrne (1783–1864)
- Architectural type: Church
- Style: Greek Revival

Administration
- Archdiocese: Dublin

St. Paul's is a former church building of the Catholic Church sited on Arran Quay, Dublin, Ireland. The church is used currently by a Catholic youth group.

== History ==
The church was built between 1835 and 1837 to the design of Patrick Byrne who also designed nearby St Audoen's Catholic Church and the Church of the Immaculate Conception (Adam and Eve's) on Merchants Quay. Aughrim St parish was created from St Paul's parish, in 1877. Cabra was constituted from Arran Quay in 1941. In 1852 Captain Charles Boycott married Annie Dunne. Eamonn and Sinead De Valera were married at St. Paul's in 1910.

The lay Community of Sant'Egidio had a centre at St Paul’s Church.

After a decline in numbers living in the parish, St. Paul's ceased to be the parish church in 1999, with worship transferred to St. Michan's (Halston Street) and to Capuchin Friary, Church Street, both also run by the Capuchins who ran St. Paul's in latter years. The church is used currently by a Catholic youth group with Catholic Youth Care based in the presbytery and by the St. Gregrorios Jacobite Syrian Christian Church for worship.

St. Paul's Church has hosted the Tridentine Latin mass since its closure as the parish church. It has also hosted inter-denominational Taizé group meetings and services.

== Architecture ==
St Paul's was Byrne's first church. The cornerstone was laid on St Patrick's Day 1835 by the archbishop of Dublin, Dr Daniel Murray.

=== Exterior ===
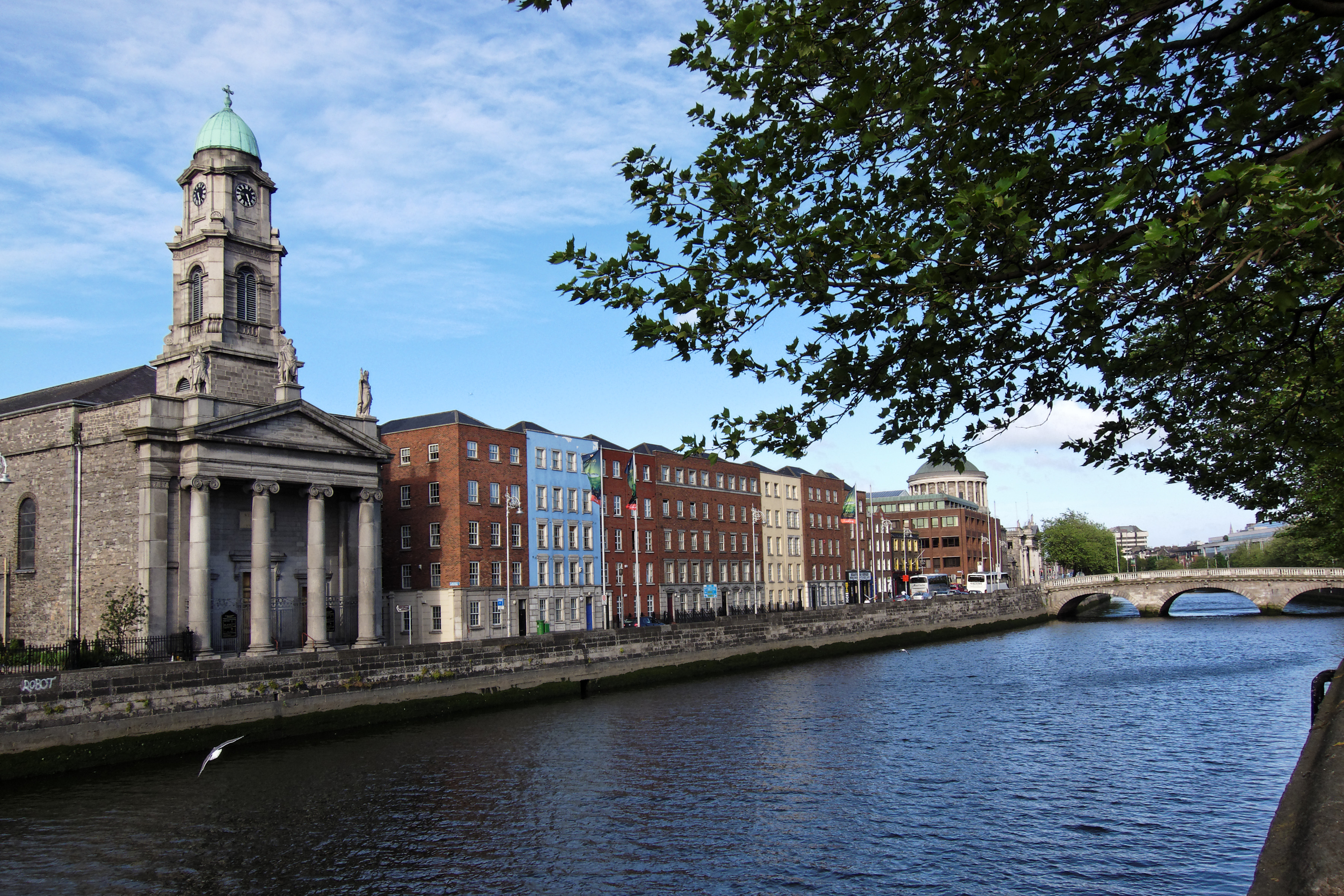
St. Paul's Church, Arran Quay

The church was designed by Patrick Byrne and built between 1835 and 1844, not long after Catholic emancipation. The front has a granite portico with four Ionic columns. The three-stage Italianate bell tower, with its copper dome, was completed in 1843 and is a visual focal point along the quay, except where blocked by the dome of the Four Courts to the east. The inclusion of a clock, less common in Catholic Churches, implies a sense of public responsibility thus increasing the status of the building.

St Paul's contains a peal of eight bells cast by James Sheridan, of the Eagle Foundry, Church Street. These were originally hung for change ringing for most of their existence; however, they were converted into a chime (operated by one person only) in 1950, and can no longer be rung full circle.

A statue of St. Paul above the portico tops the apex, flanked by statues of SS. Peter and Patrick. The statues are the work of Joseph Robinson Kirk and were added about 1870. The large centre door leads to the church proper, while the smaller doors on either side give access to the balcony.

Barred gates have been added to the portico to prevent homeless people from sheltering under it.

=== Interior ===
The entrance hallway, inside the main door, has a mosaic floor. a marble baptismal font is in the rear of the nave. It has a shallow barrel-vaulted coffered ceiling. Steps to the altar are of marble, as is the altar itself. The mural above the altar is a copy of Rubens' Conversion of St. Paul, done by F. S. Barff around 1863, which replaced an earlier depiction of the crucifixion. The apse is lit by a skylight.

== People associated with St. Paul's Arran Quay ==
- Bishop Patrick Fitzsimons served as parish priest of St. Paul's (1729–44). He oversaw the building of the first chapel on the site, replacing a warehouse which had been used for worship.
- Bishop Thomas Grimley, served as a curate in St. Paul's earlier in his career.
- Blessed Dom Columba Marmion, OSB, was baptised Joseph Aloysius Marmion in St. Paul's

== Centre for Mission and Ministry ==
The Dublin Diocesan Ministry and Mission Office, is now based in St. Paul's. The Diocesan Certificate in Catechesis, Funeral Ministry Training and other programmes are run from the centre. The Ecumenical Foundational Leadership Programme is run jointly between the centre and the Church of Ireland United Diocesan Young Adults Ministry, and based in St. Paul's.
