= St Ignatius Church, Galway =

St Ignatius Church
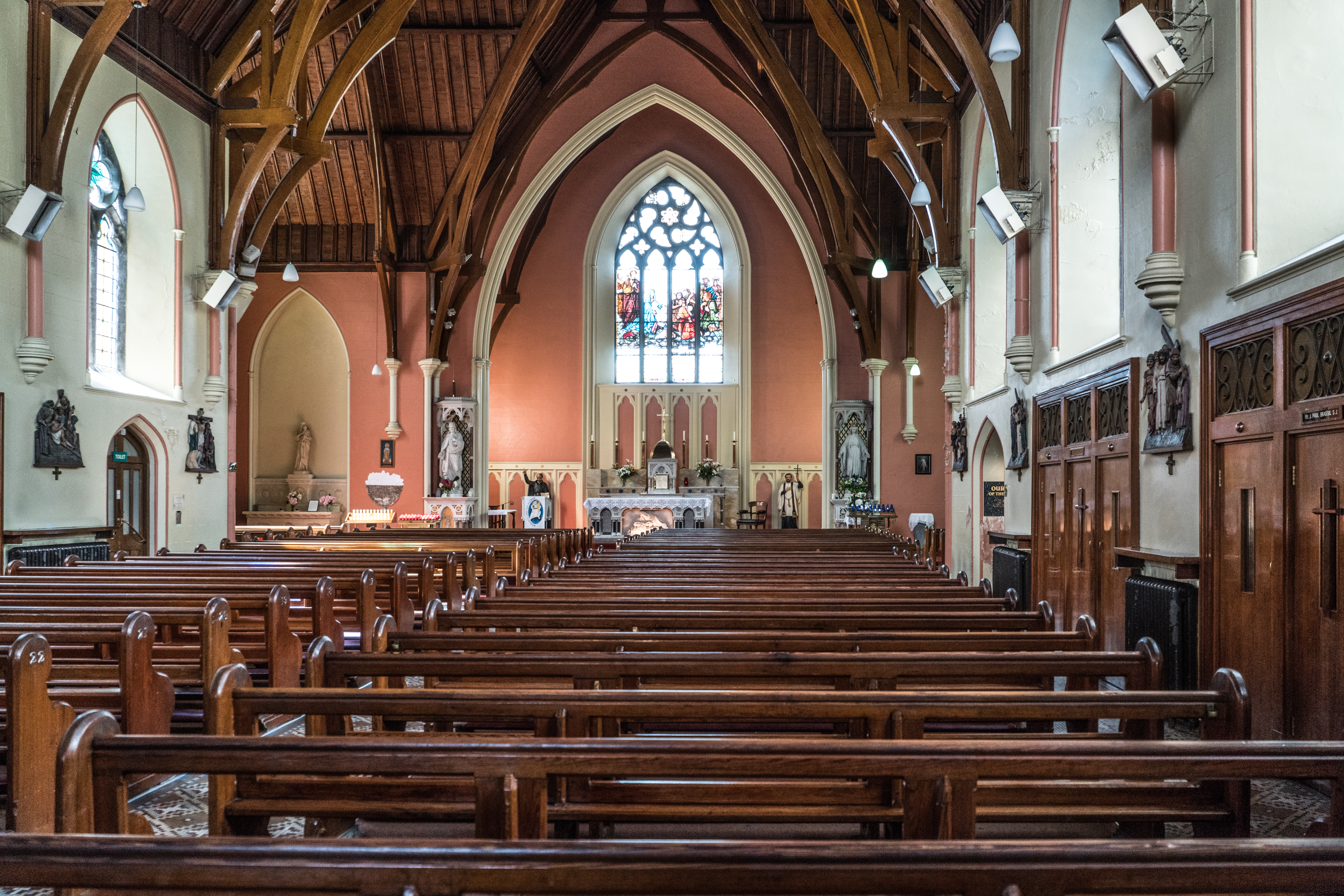
- Church nave
- St Ignatius Church
- 53.2696°N 9.0616°W
- Location: Galway
- Country: Ireland
- Denomination: Roman Catholic

History
- Status: Active
- Founded: 1863
- Dedication: Ignatius of Loyola

Architecture
- Functional status: Chapel of ease
- Heritage designation: Protected structure

Administration
- Province: Tuam
- Diocese: Galway, Kilmacduagh and Kilfenora
- Deanery: Galway City West
- Parish: St Joseph's, Galway

Clergy
- Bishop: Most Rev. Michael Duignan

St Ignatius Church or the Jesuit Church is a Roman Catholic Church building served by the Society of Jesus next to Coláiste Iognáid in Galway. It was founded in 1863 and is a protected structure in the city.

== History ==
=== Origins ===
The Jesuits came to Galway in 1620. In 1645 they built their first school in the area. Throughout the 17th century they were banished and invited back into Galway on numerous occasions. In 1652, they had to leave because of the arrival of Oliver Cromwell's army was in the area. They then returned with the restoration of Charles II in 1660, but were banished again in 1691 by the army of William III, returning finally in 1728.

=== Foundation ===
In 1859, the Bishop of Galway, John McEvilly invited the Jesuits to create a college and a church in the area. In 1863, both the church and the college, Coláiste Iognáid, were built. St Ignatius' church was originally a 'service church' or chapel of ease that would serve the local parish church, St Joseph's. In 1971, Bishop Michael Browne asked that the church become a parish church. However, in October 2003, it reverted to being a chapel of ease.

== Work ==
=== Spirituality ===
Close to the church was the Jesuit Centre for Spirituality and Culture. It was founded in 2006 and was a non-residential centre that, as well as offering courses, talks and workshops in Ignatian spirituality also hosted conferences and events on Irish and Christian heritage. The Centre is now closed.

=== Church ===
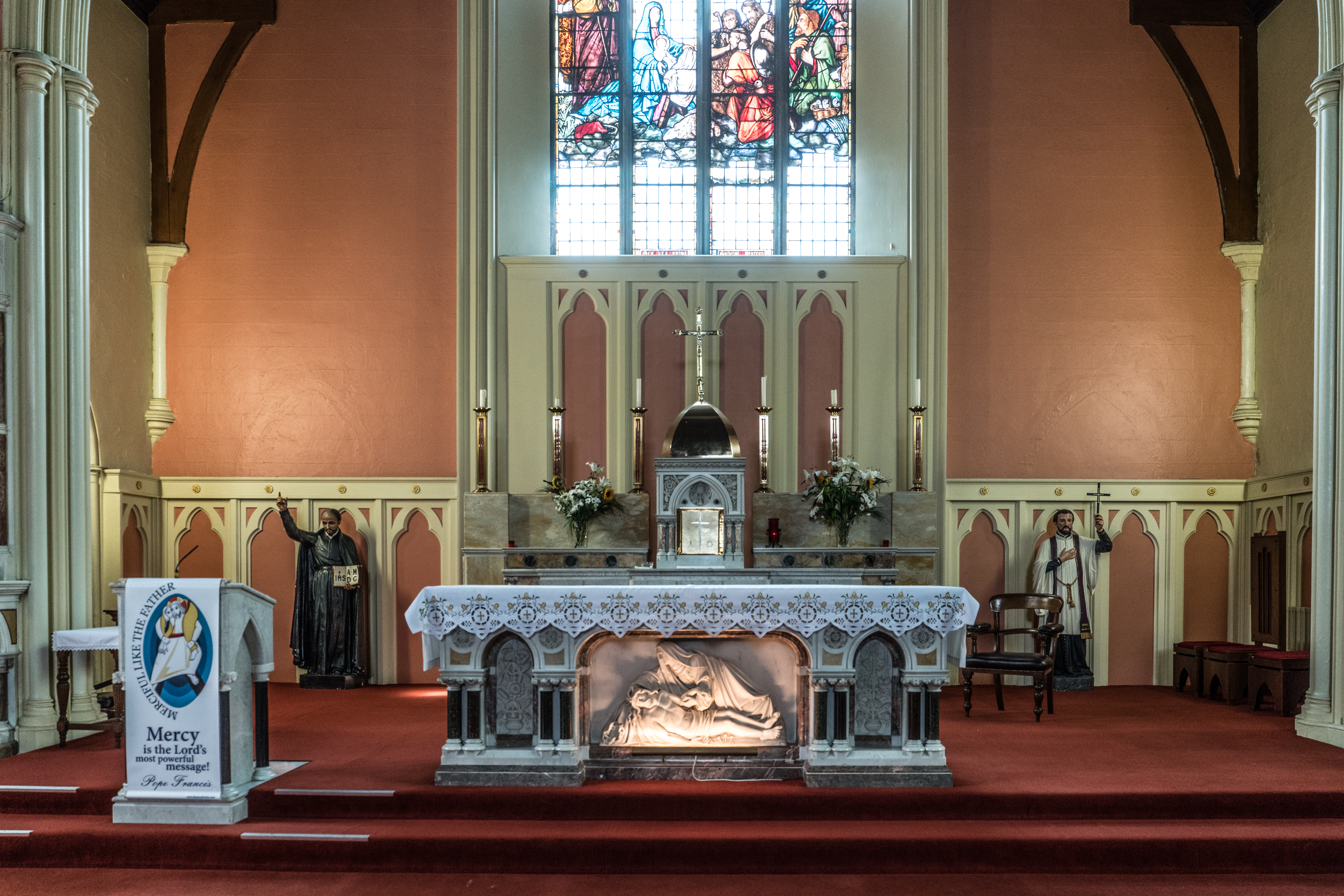
Church Chancel

The church holds a Vigil Mass on Saturday evening 6:00 pm and one Mass on Sundays at 11:00 am. On weekdays from Monday to Saturday Mass is held in the morning at 9:00 am. Confessions are offered on Saturday between 11.30am-12pm.

=== School ===
The church has a close relationship with the school next door, Coláiste Iognáid. The church building is used frequently by the school and a Jesuit from the church always sits on the school's board of management.

== See also ==
- List of Jesuit sites in Ireland
- List of Catholic churches in Ireland
