= Glenswilly National School =

Coordinates: 54.9358°N 7.8491°W

- County Donegal; Ireland

Information
- Former name: Rashedoge NS; Keelogs NS; Templedouglas NS; Trankeel NS; Leitir Liag NS
- Status: Open
- Principal: Joseph Gallinagh
- Campus type: Rural
- Alumni: Manus Kelly; Michael Murphy

Glenswilly National School is an Irish school located close to Breenagh in County Donegal. It has been educating students for over 50 years.

Joseph Gallinagh is principal.

== History ==
Glenswilly is an amalgamation of five schools: they were respectfully Rashedoge NS, Keelogs NS, Templedouglas NS, Trankeel NS and Leitir Liag NS. Roll books from each of the five schools are intact and have been put on display. Glenswilly combined the five schools and began operating from September 1973 onwards. Leitir Liag NS was the last of the schools to join.

Hugh Herrity was Glenswilly National School's first principal.

The 1980s saw two more classrooms given to Glenswilly National School. Then the school began looking for a proper extension.

The school is noted for using the phrase "seeking an extension since 1992" for many years. The school is noted for spending the years between 1992 and 2021 looking for an extension, which was eventually delivered.

Glenswilly National School acquired some land in 2012.

Liam Mac Gabhann retired as principal in 2012, having worked for twenty years to be granted that extension. Mac Gabhann (also McGowan) was the school's second principal since the amalgamation.

Joseph Gallinagh succeeded Liam Mac Gabhann (McGowan) as principal, to become its third principal since the amalgamation.

A pupil won a Bord Gáis Theatre Award for drama in 2016.

A fifth class pupil won a national art competition based on raising disability awareness in 2019.

Work on extending the school to provide more classrooms was approved in 2019. Work got underway in May 2020. Phase one opened in March 2021 following the COVID-19 pandemic holiday.

Glenswilly celebrated 50 years in business in 2023, excluding its time before the amalgamation, when it was operating five different schools. Glenswilly National School began an autistic spectrum disorder (ASD) class, also in 2023.

== Notable alumni ==
- Michael Murphy, a footballer who plays as a full forward for Glenswilly and, formerly, for the Donegal county team, which he captained from December 2010 until his retirement from inter-county football in November 2022, attended the school.
- Manus Kelly, a rally driver, who won a three in a row Donegal International Rallies, had many dignitaries attend his funeral including Micheál Martin. Leo Varadkar sent his aide-de-camp.
