= St Paul's Church, Mullingar =

Saint Paul's Church
- Saint Paul's Catholic Church
- Séipéal Naomh Pól
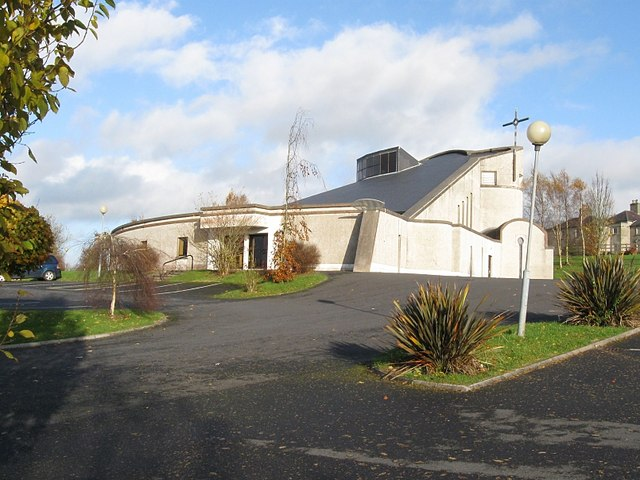
- Saint Paul's Church, as seen from the carpark which is located adjacent to the church

- Location of the church in Ireland
- 53.527634°N 7.328943°W
- OS grid reference: N 445 465
- Location: Mullingar, County Westmeath
- Country: Ireland
- Denomination: Catholic
- Website: www.mullingarparish.ie

History
- Dedication: Saint Paul

Architecture
- Architectural type: Modern
- Completed: 1987

Saint Paul's Church is a Roman Catholic church located in the west of Mullingar town in County Westmeath, Ireland. Less than fifty years old, Saint Paul's Church is the newest Catholic church in the town of Mullingar.

== History ==
Built in 1987, the church holds an unusual modern design which is the result of liturgical changes brought about following the Second Vatican Council, which has allowed architects to move away from traditional church building forms and experiment with more unconventional designs.
