= St Audoen's Church, Dublin (Roman Catholic) =

Church in Ireland

St Audoen's
- St Audoen's Catholic Church
- Eaglais Naomh Audoen
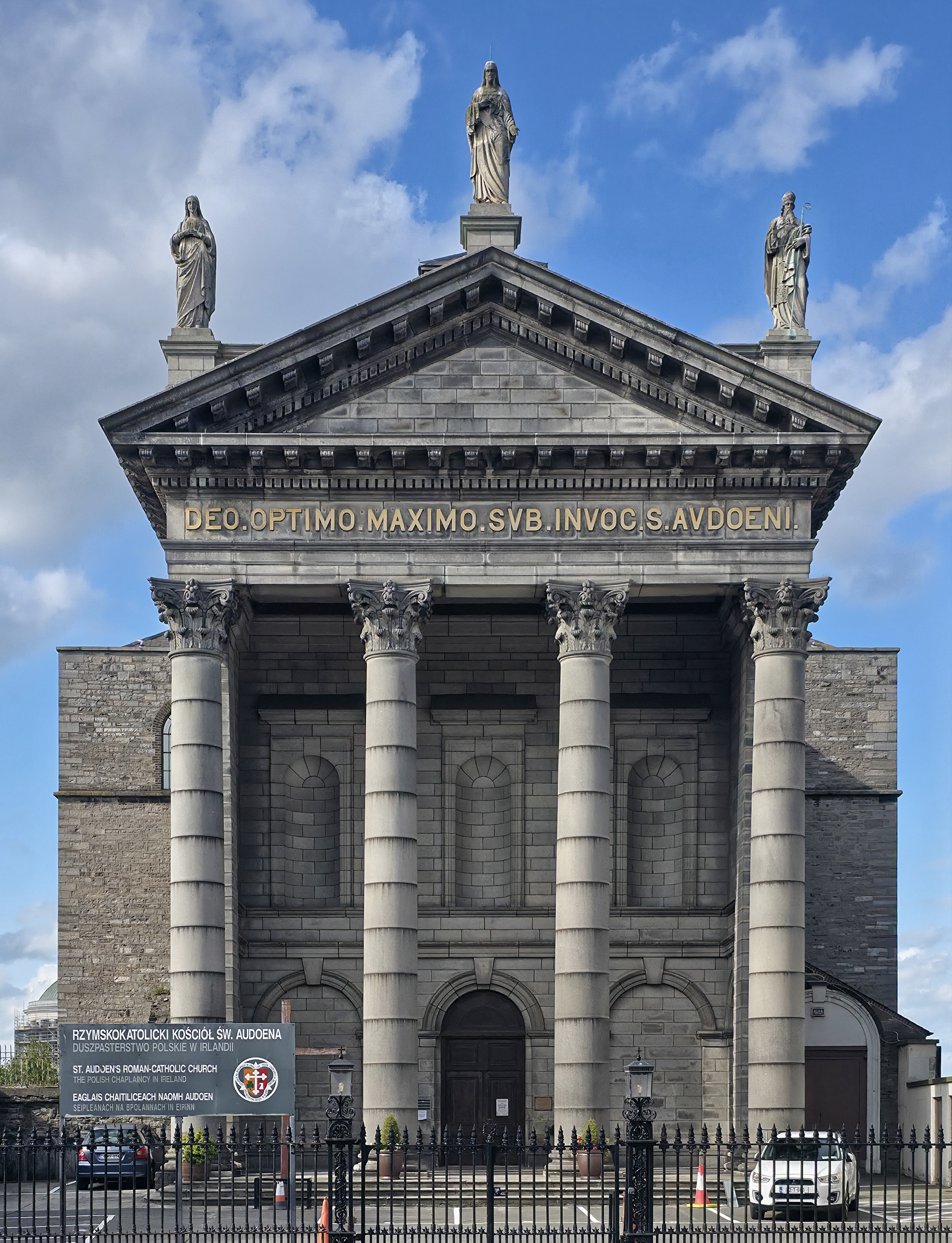

- 53.343629°N 6.27372°W
- Location: 14/15 High Street; Dublin
- Country: Ireland
- Denomination: Roman Catholic
- Website: http://kosciol-dublin.pl/

History
- Founded: 1841
- Dedication: Saint Audoen
- Consecrated: 1847

Architecture
- Architect: Patrick Byrne (1783-1864); George Ashlin
- Architectural type: Church
- Style: Greek Revival

Administration
- Archdiocese: Dublin
- Deanery: South City Centre

St Audoen's is the church of the parish of St Audoen that is located south of the River Liffey at Cornmarket in Dublin, Ireland. The parish is in the Roman Catholic Archdiocese of Dublin. The church is now home to the Polish chaplaincy in Ireland. There is an Anglican church of the same name adjacent to it.

== History ==
The church was built between 1841 and 1847 to the neoclassical design of Patrick Byrne who also designed nearby St. Paul's Church on Arran Quay and Church of the Immaculate Conception (Adam and Eve's) on Merchants Quay. The cornerstone was laid in July 1841. A founding member donor being Daniel O’Connell.

St. Audoen's houses the National Shrine of St. Anne. The site on which the church is built formerly housed a college to accommodate the chaplains to the Guild of St Anne's, originally known as Blakeney Inns and later St. Anne's Inns. The statue of St. Anne was made by Deghini's of Fishamble Street, Dublin, and was donated by a Mrs. Kelly in 1919.

=== Architecture ===
A central dome positioned over the crossing of the nave was the main external feature of the church until it collapsed in 1880 and was replaced with a flat roof. It has a double-level crypt to compensate for the steeply sloping site. In 1898 the portico including the piazza to the front and railings was added by George Ashlin. The pediment over portico has a granite frieze supported on granite Corinthian columns. Like the earlier St. Paul's, above the pediment are carved statues at each end and at the apex.

The walls are constructed of Black calp and are best appreciated from Cook Street from where their sheer bulk dominates the area and the Medieval Dublin City Walls. Because of its steeply sloping site, the church has a double level crypt to the rear.

The interior, which has a coffered barrel-vaulted ceiling, is lit by lunette windows high above the walls. The statue of Our Lady's Altar is by Peter Bonanni of Rome, which won a gold medal at the Dublin Exhibition in 1853.

The holy water stoups on either side of the main doors are giant clam shells that were donated in 1917 by a Pacific Ocean sea captain as a gift to his brother, the parish priest at the time.

Until December 2007 the church hosted a regular Tridentine (Latin) Mass. The church has experienced a resurgence of attendance due to the influx of Polish immigrants who regularly celebrate mass in the church in their native language. St Audoen's Church is now home to the Polish chaplaincy in Ireland.

== Gallery ==
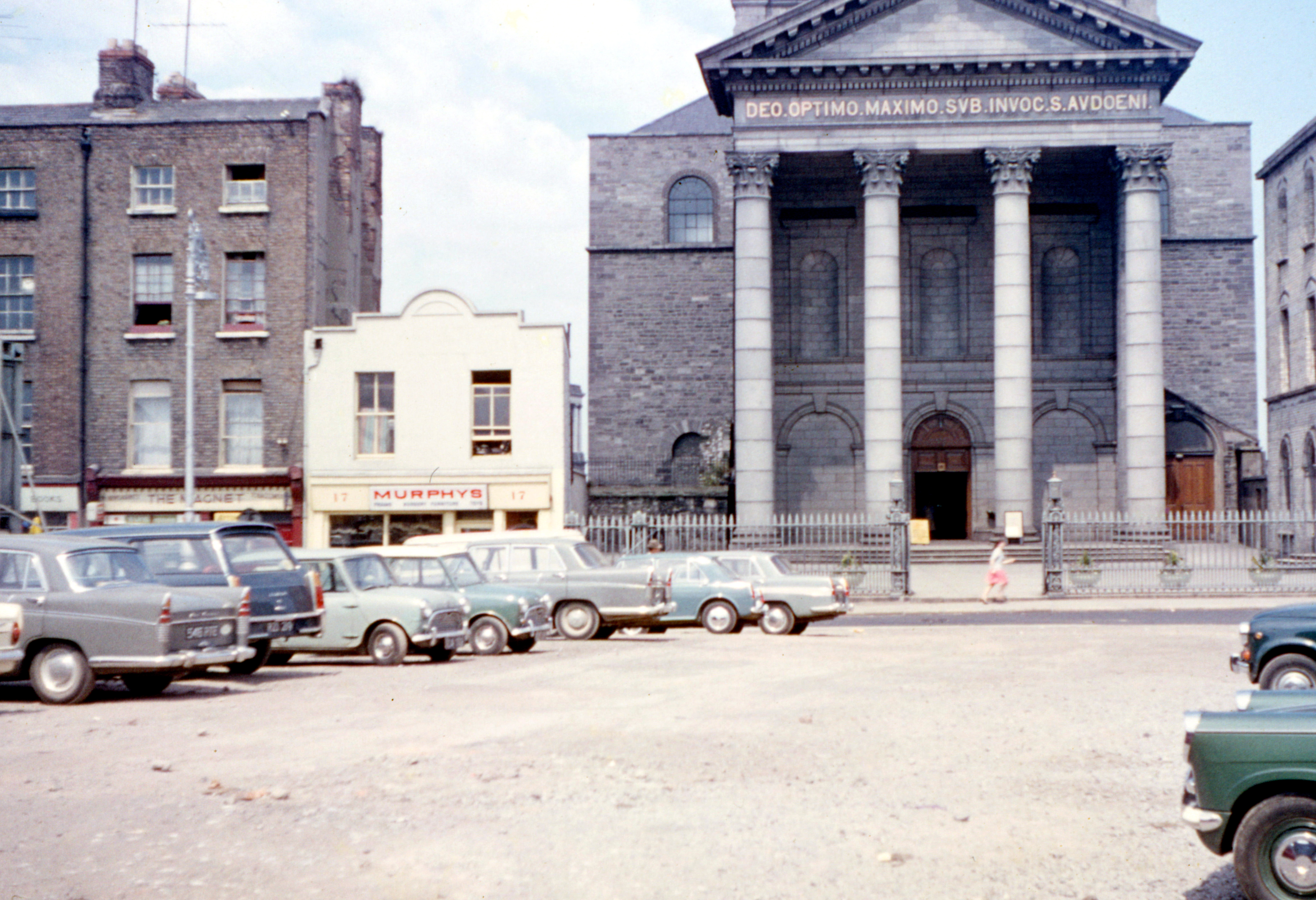
Front of the church in 1968

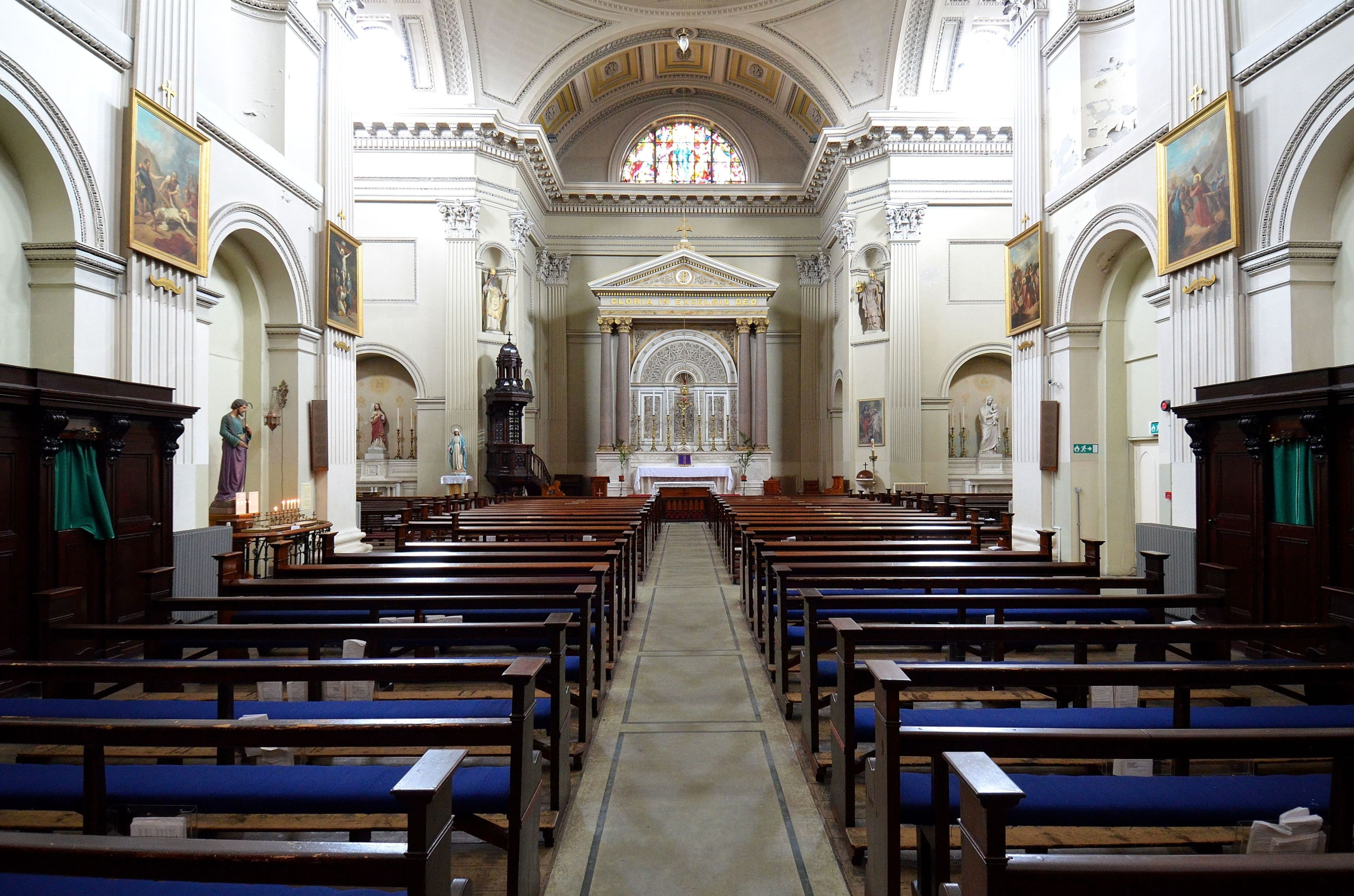
Inside

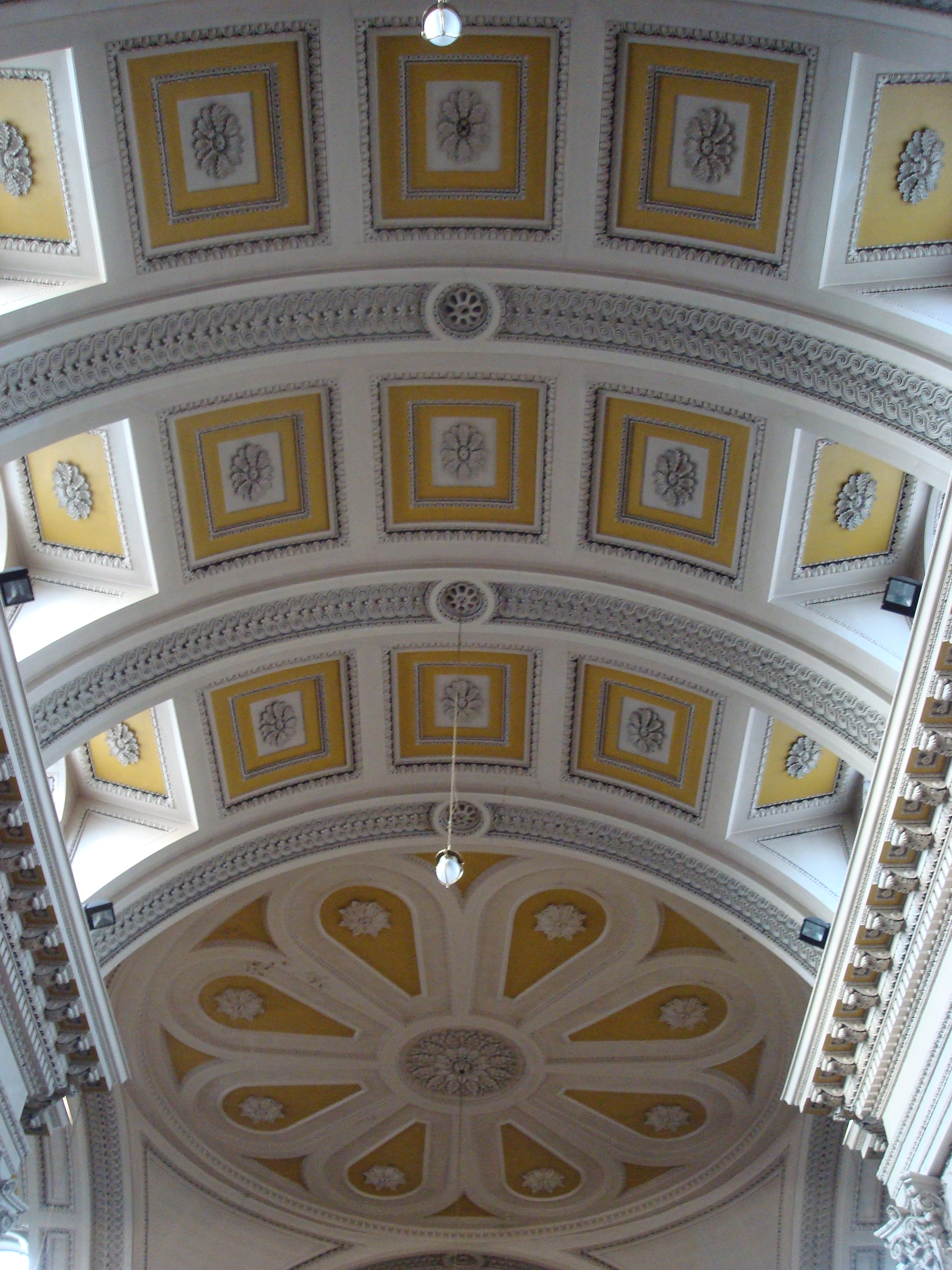
Ceiling with lunette windows bringing in light

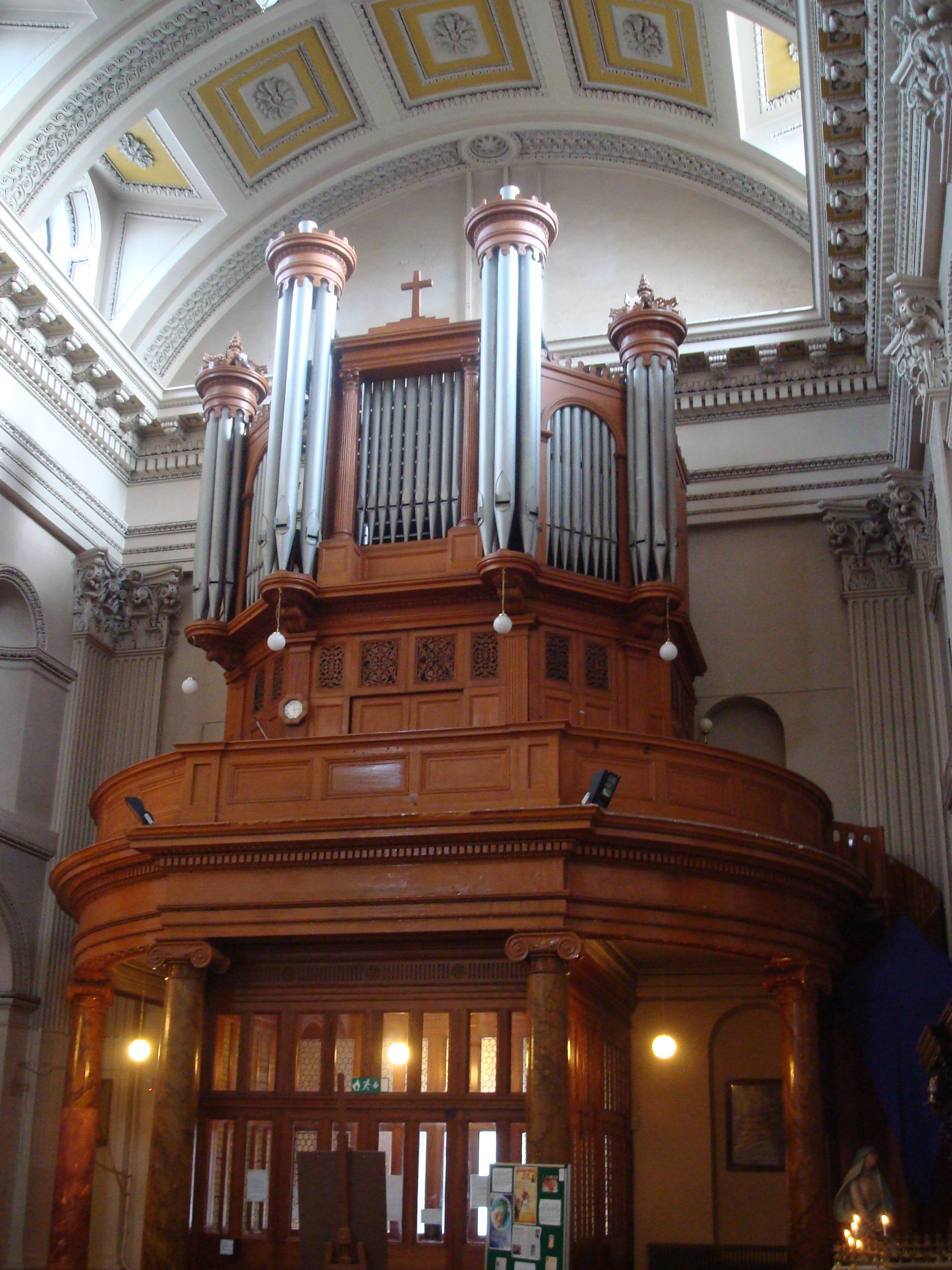
The organ above the entrance doors

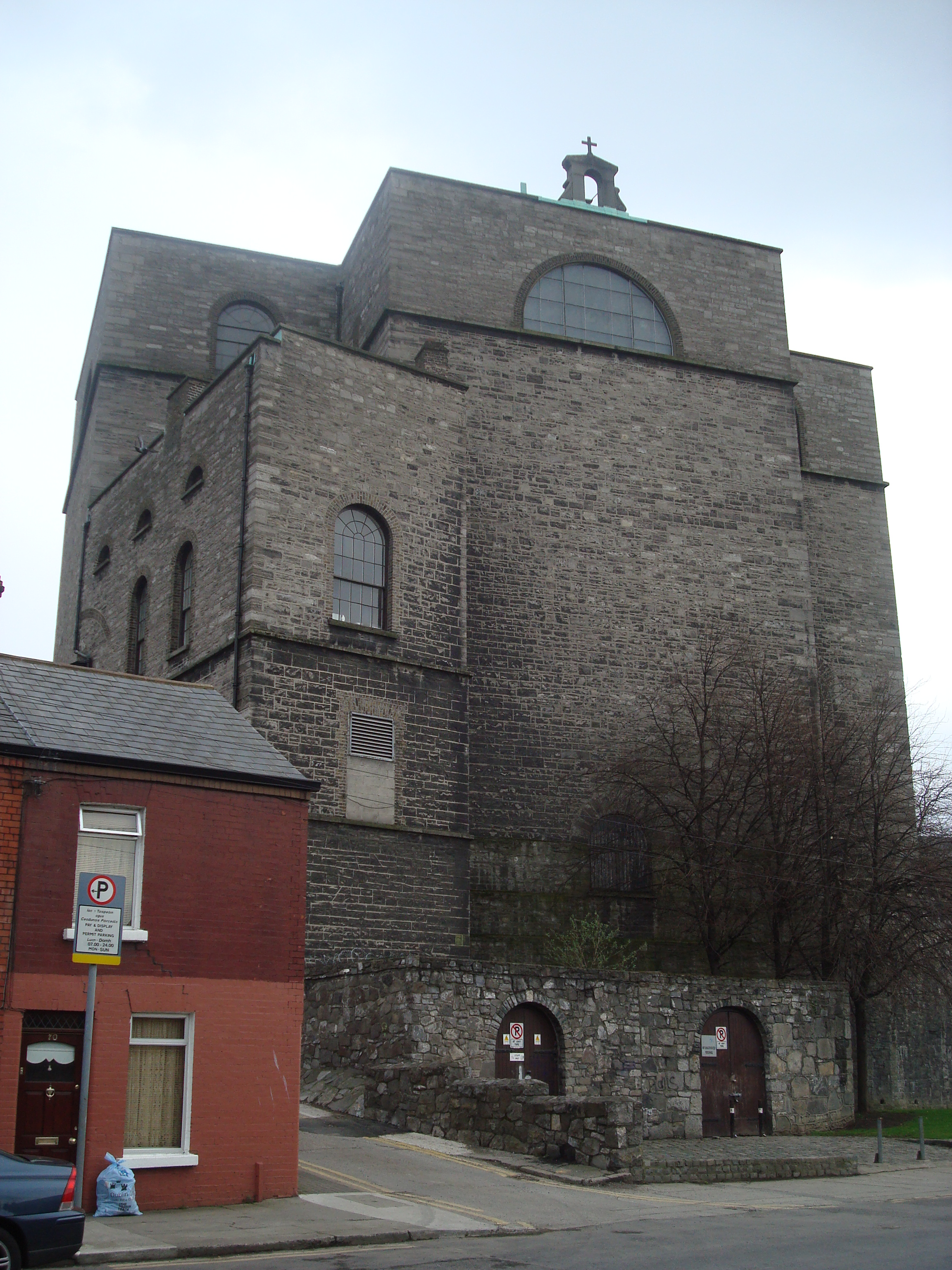
The rear of the church showing the black calp walls

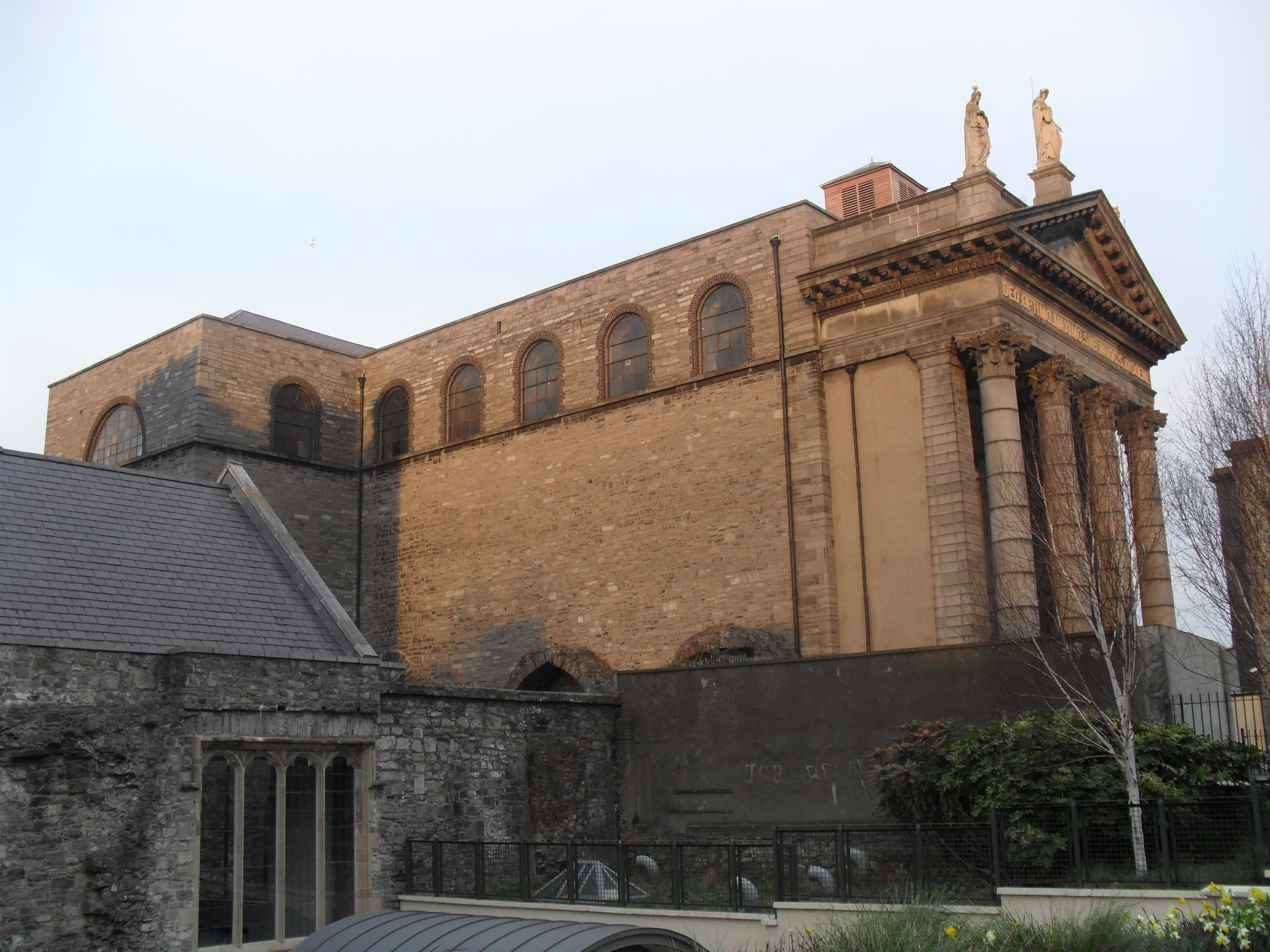
West wall
