= St Columba's Church, Glenswilly =

- St Columba's Church
- St Columba's Church, Glenswilly
- 54.9426°N 7.8673°W
- Location: Glenswilly, County Donegal
- Country: Ireland
- Denomination: Catholic

History
- Status: Active
- Dedication: Columba

Architecture
- Years built: 1840-1841

Administration
- Diocese: Raphoe
- Parish: Glenswilly & Templedouglas

St Columba's Church, Glenswilly is a Catholic church which serves the parish of Glenswilly and Templedouglas in County Donegal, Ireland. The parish is in the Roman Catholic Diocese of Raphoe.

The church was built in the early 1840s and renovated in 1994. It is included in the Record of Protected Structures published by Donegal County Council.

The funeral mass of the rally driver and local politician, Manus Kelly, was held in the church in June 2019.
