= Mary Immaculate, Refuge of Sinners Church =

Coordinates: 53.32789°N 6.26379°W

Mary Immaculate, Refuge of Sinners
- Séipéal Mhuire gan Smál, Tearmann na bPeacach, Ráth Maonais
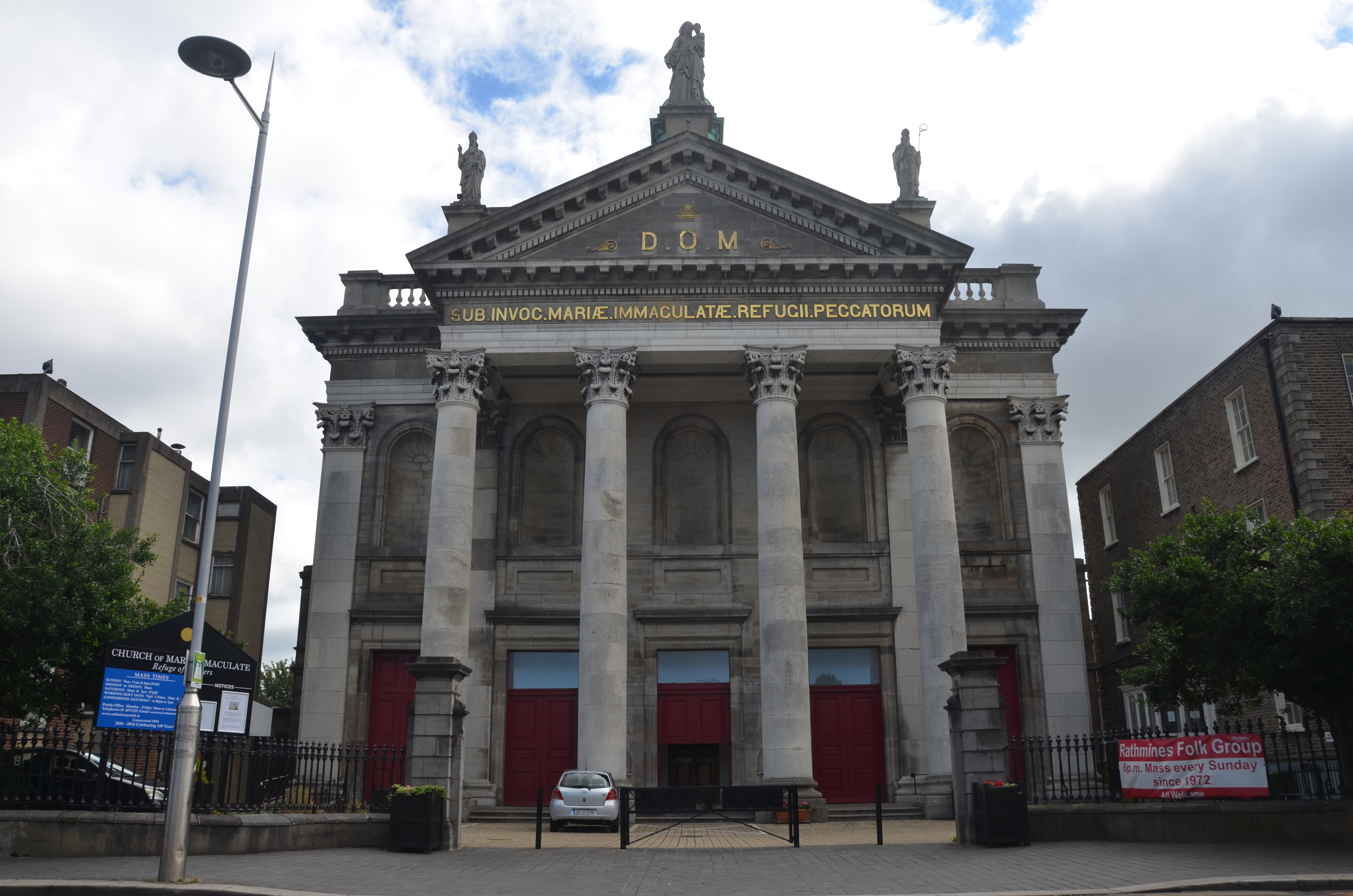
- The front in 2016

- Location within Dublin
- Location: Rathmines; County Dublin
- Country: Ireland
- Language: English
- Denomination: Roman Catholic
- Tradition: Roman Rite
- Website: https://www.rathminesparish.ie/

History
- Dedication: Mary, mother of Jesus (Refugium Peccatorum)

Architecture
- Architect: Patrick Byrne; William Henry Byrne
- Architectural type: Greek Revival

Administration
- Archdiocese: Dublin
- Deanery: Cullenswood
- Parish: Rathmines

cal Mary Immaculate, Refuge of Sinners is a Roman Catholic church in Rathmines, Dublin built in 1854 in the "Greek style".

== History ==
The church was originally designed by Patrick Byrne and later extended by William Henry Byrne who added a portico and pediment. Above the pediment is the statue, Our Lady of Refuge by sculptor James Farrell and was purchased by Rev. Matthew Collier. The statue of the Christ in the Temple is also by Farrell.

The interior of the church, roof and dome were destroyed by a fire on 26 January 1920, but were rebuilt and reopened by 1922. The dome was made even higher in the rebuilding effort.

== Gallery ==
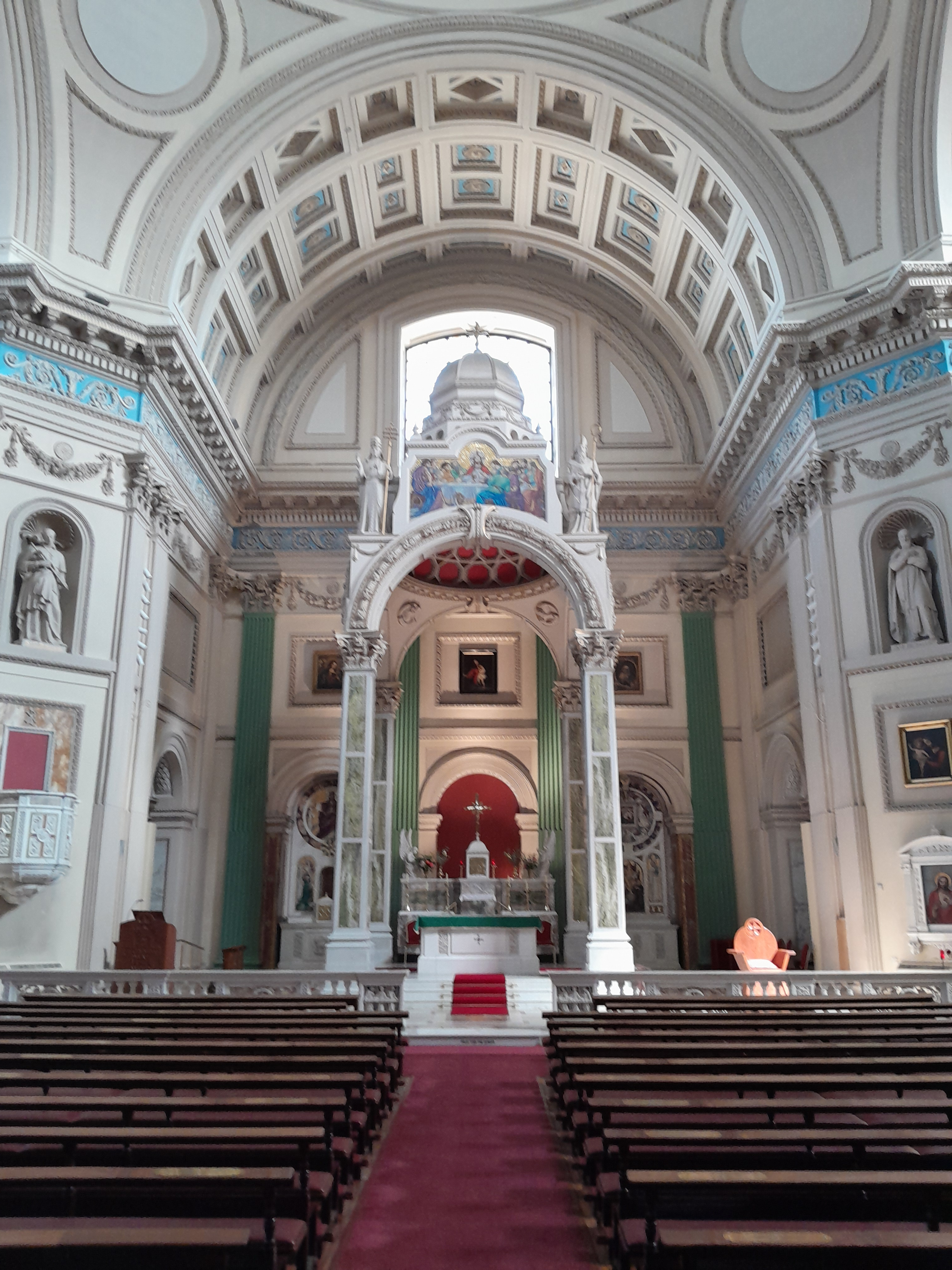

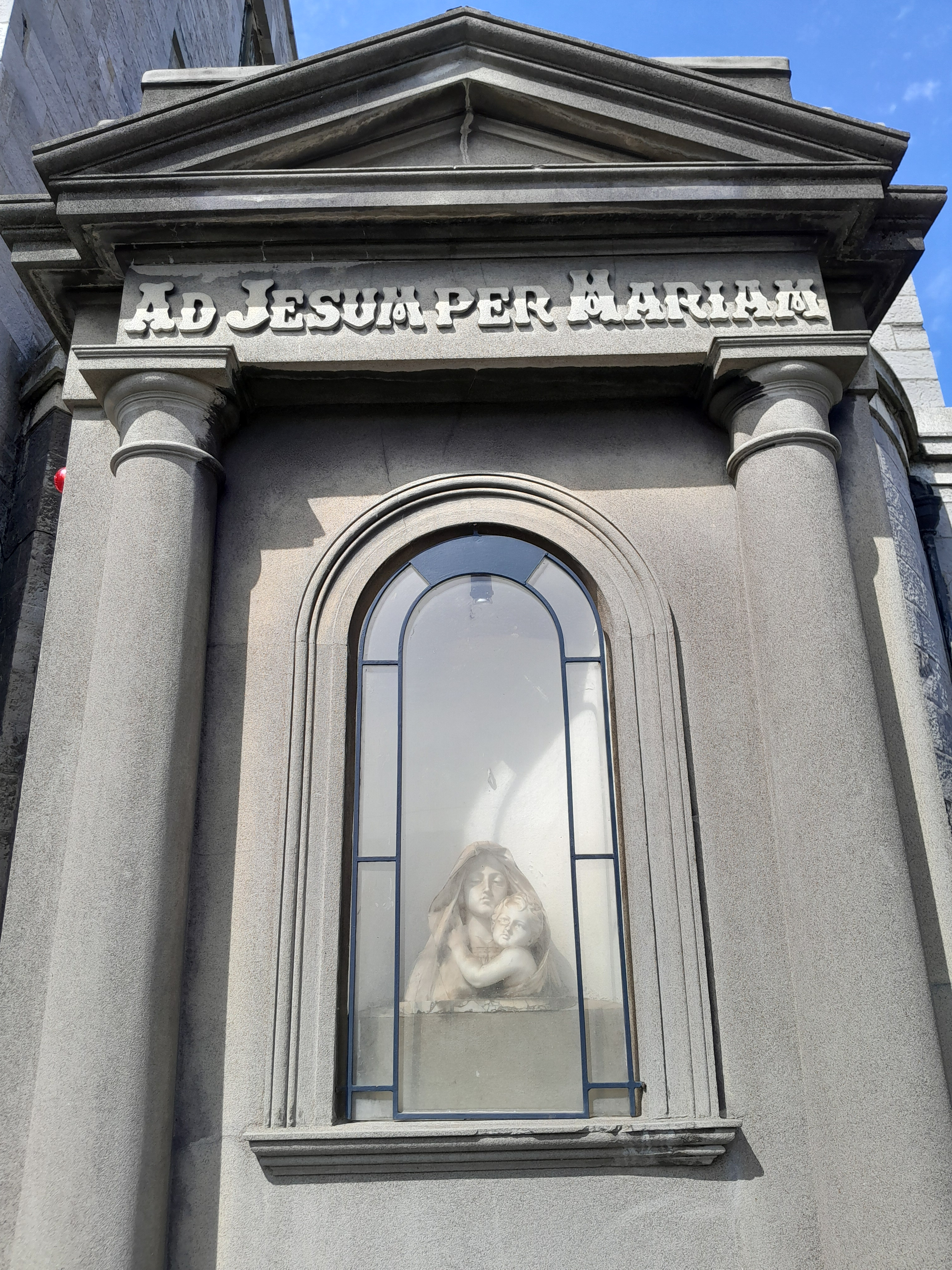

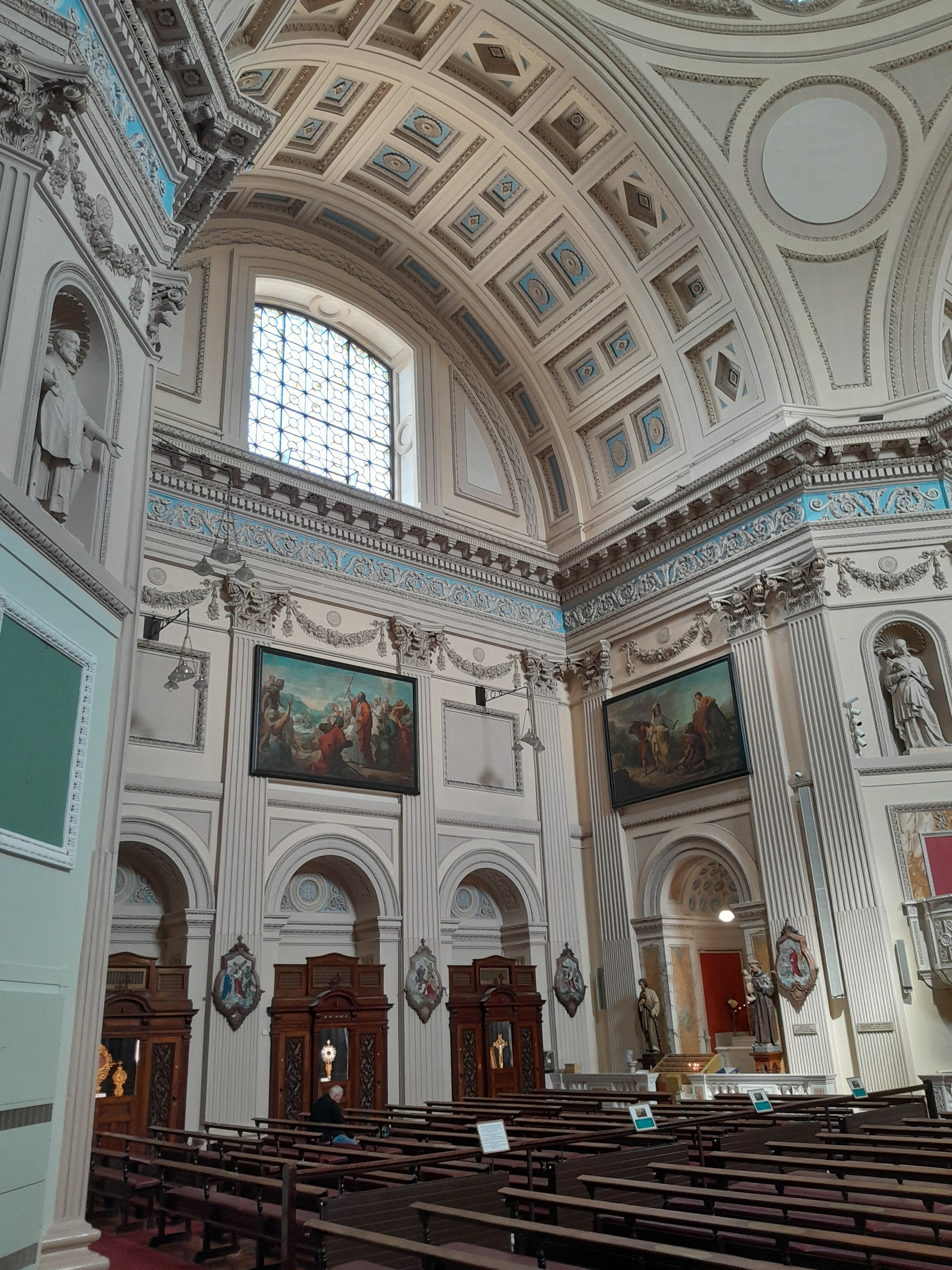

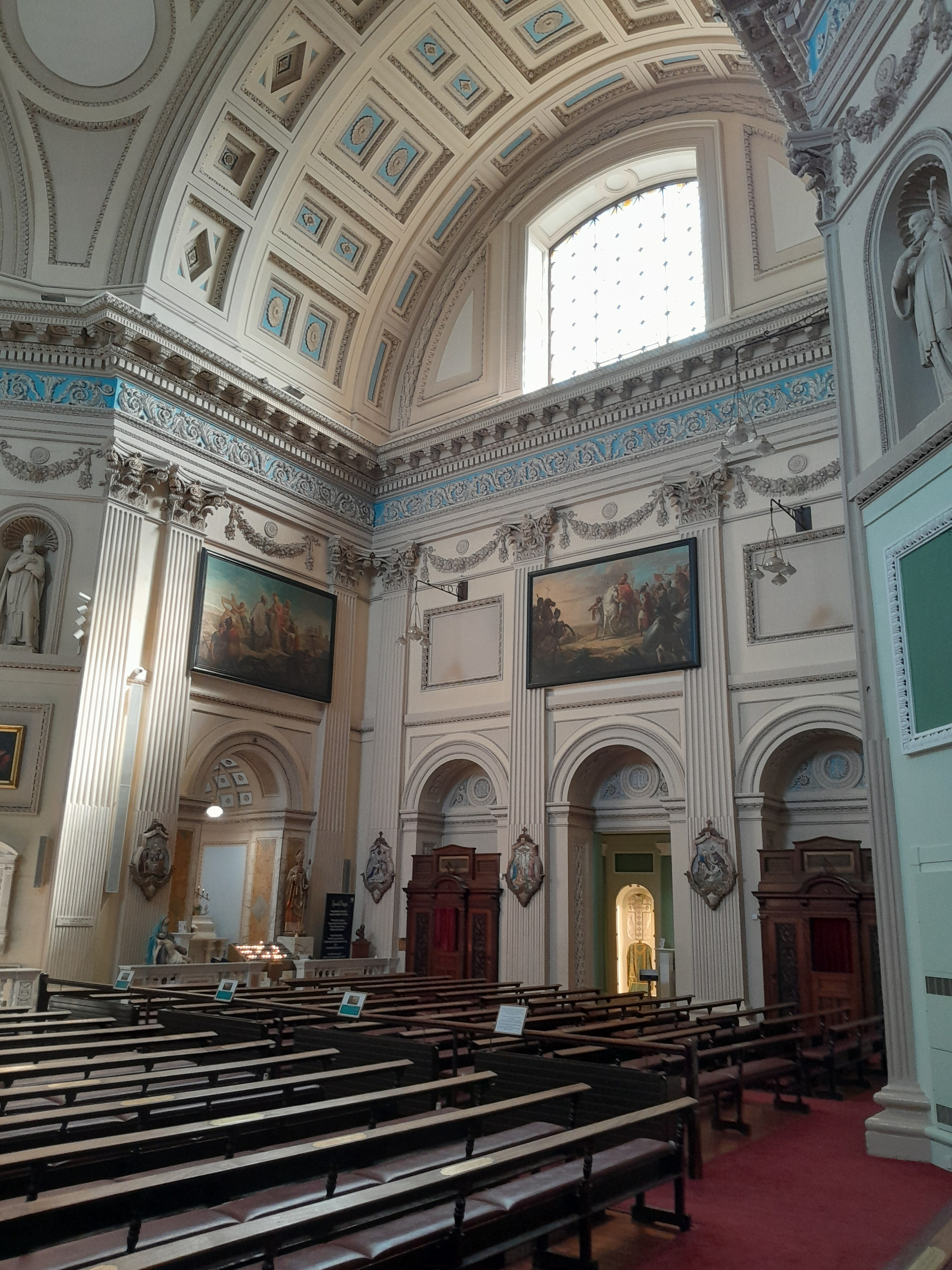

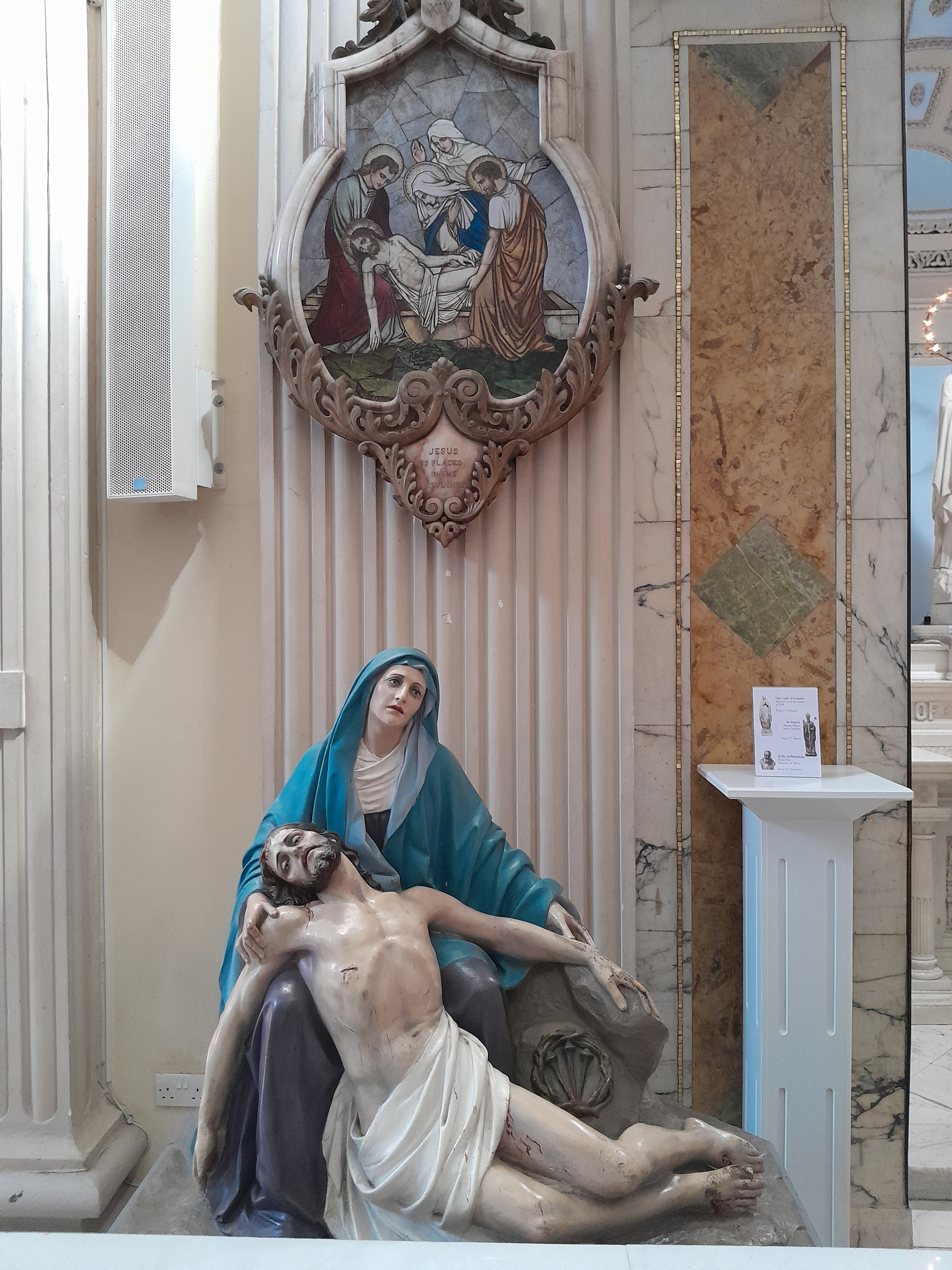

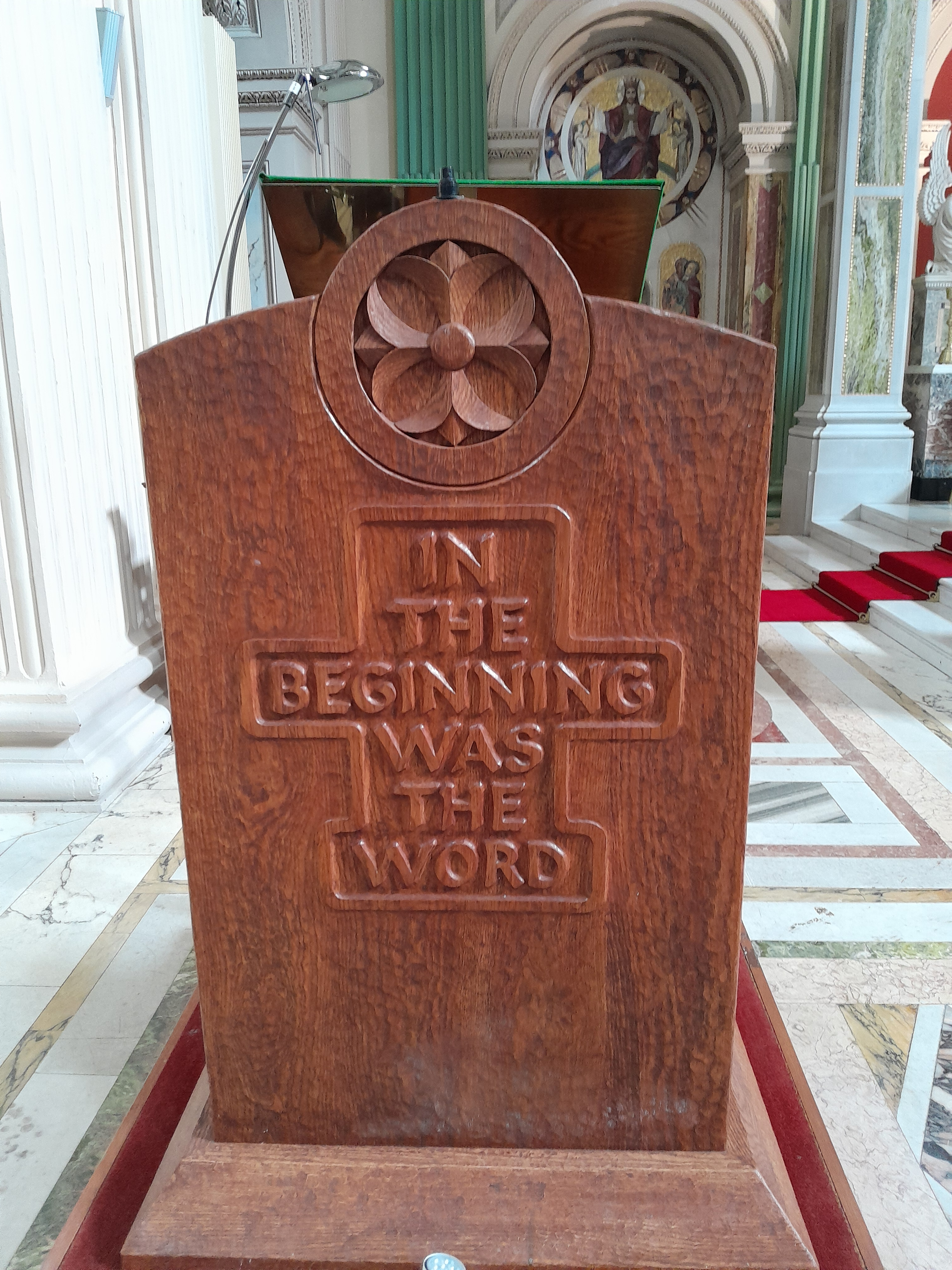

== Trivia ==
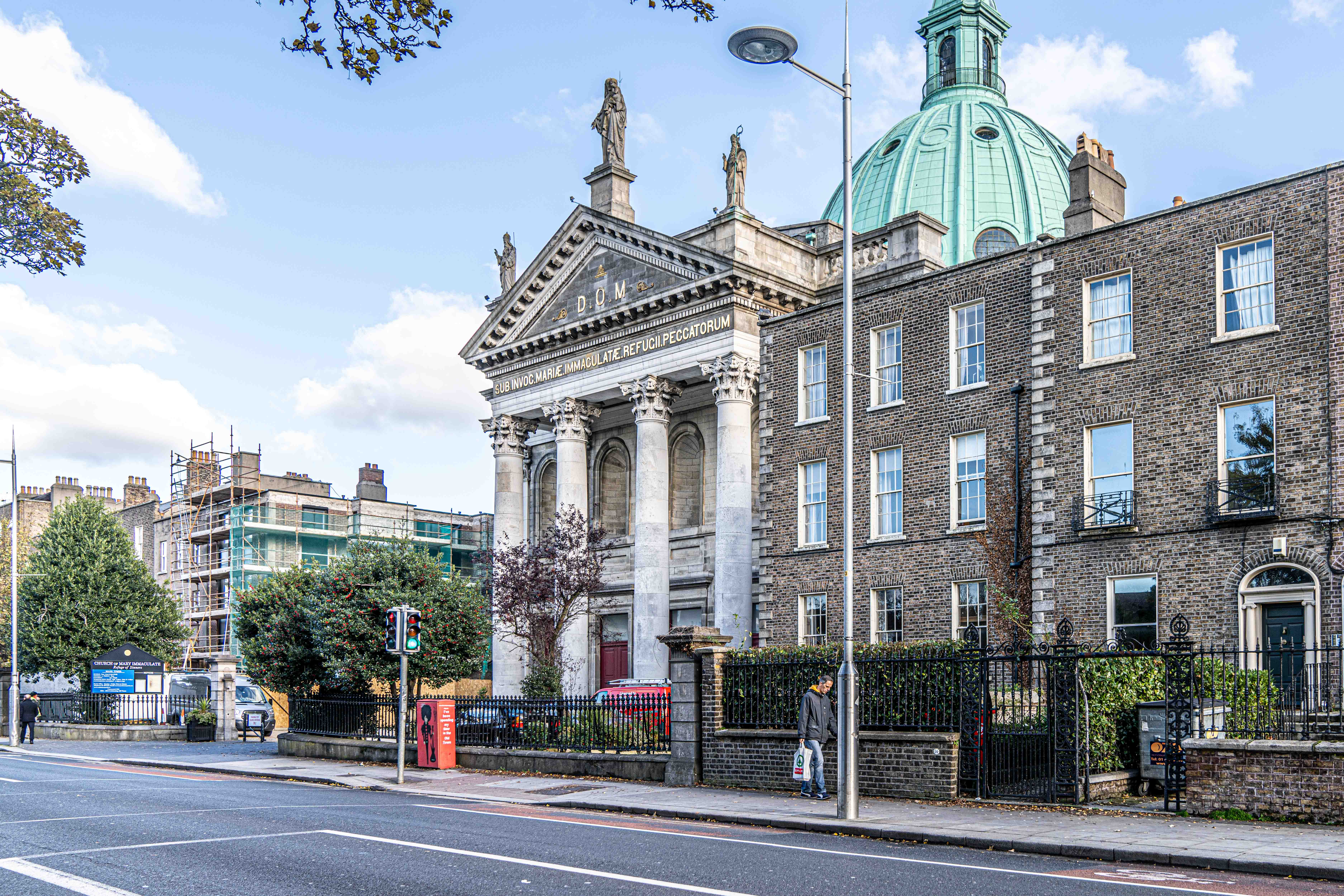
View of the church and dome

It is mentioned as "Rathmines' blue dome" in Ulysses.

Two characters in Sally Rooney's 2021 novel Beautiful World, Where Are You attend Mass in the church.
