= Patrick Byrne (architect) =

Irish architect (1783–1864)

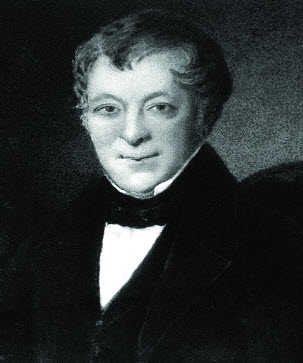
- Patrick Byrne Dublin Architect
- Born: 1783
- Died: 10 January 1864 (aged 80–81); Blackrock, Dublin, Ireland
- Resting place: Glasnevin Cemetery
- Occupation: Architect
- Known for: Architect of many Prominent Irish Catholic Churches

Patrick Byrne (1783 – 10 January 1864) was an Irish architect who built many Catholic churches in Dublin. He also served as a vice president of the Royal Institute of the Architects of Ireland.

== History ==
He studied under Henry Aarond Baker (1753–1836) at the Dublin Society Schools from 4 February 1796. As Baker had been a student and partner of James Gandon, Byrne would likely have been introduced to neoclassicism around this time. Byrne won a second class premium in 1797 and a first class premium in 1798.

Between 1820 and 1846 he worked as a measurer and later as an architect with the Wide Streets Commission. Although there is no record of Byrne designing any building before St. Pauls' Church in 1835, Brendan Grimes says that Byrne must have acquired sufficient experience to have been awarded the commission. He suggests that if Byrne did not have his own firm, then he "...was almost certainly working as a partner or chief assistant with another architect"; likely his teacher, Henry Aaron Baker, or Francis Johnston. After the Catholic emancipation of 1829, limits to church building were removed and he was commissioned to design many Catholic churches in Dublin. Byrne worked from 10 Mabbot Street.

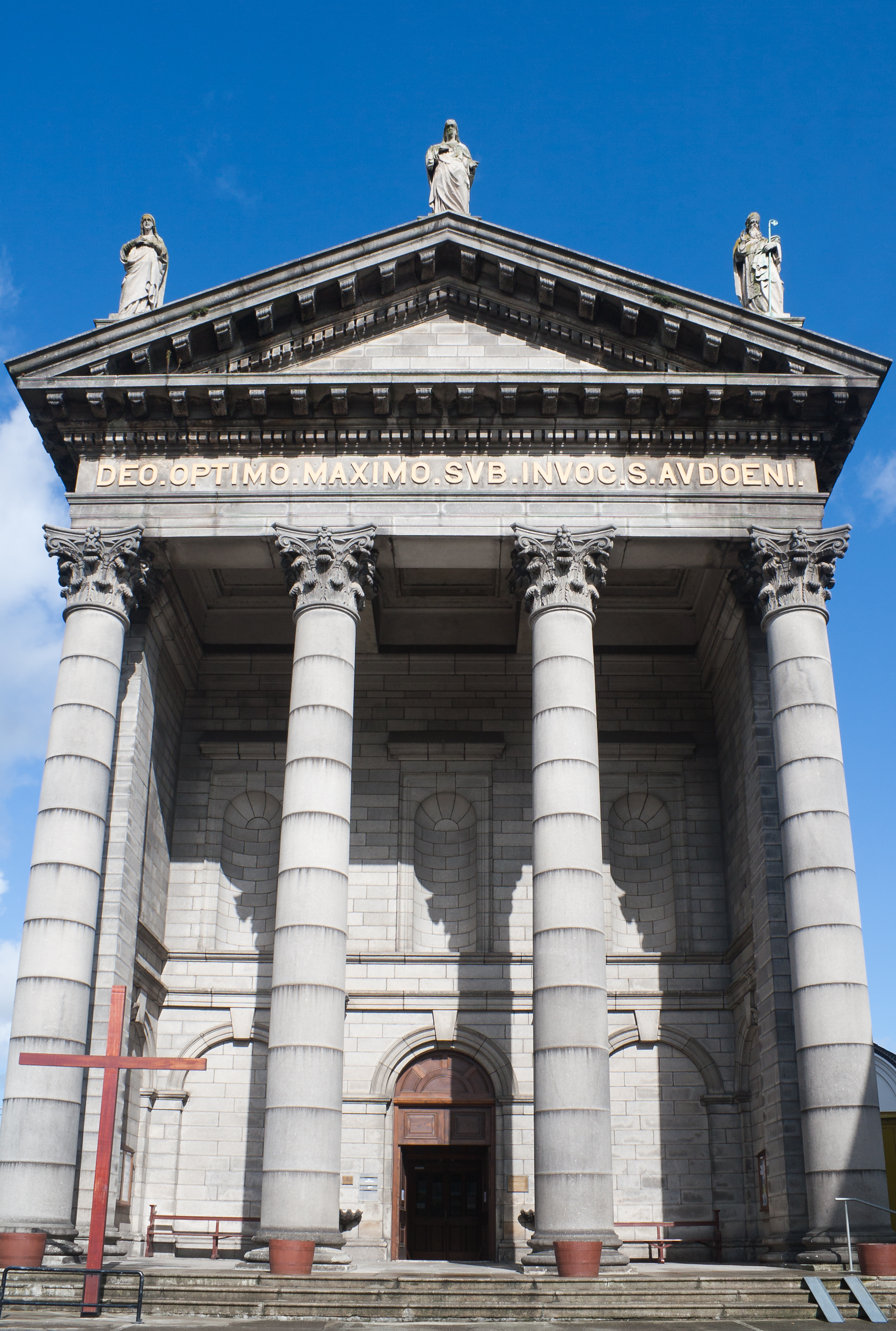
St. Audoen's Church, High Street

The cornerstone of St. Audoen's Church was laid in July 1841. Like St. Paul's it is of a neoclassical design, this time Byrne opting for Corinthian columns. And like St. Paul's, it features three statues atop the pediment. A particular challenge in the design was the building of the church on a steep slope. To compensate, the church has a double-level crypt.

Byrne was a council member of the Royal Institute of the Architects of Ireland between 1842–1843 and 1846–1854. In 1847 he became a fellow and later a vice president between 1855 and 1864. He was also a vice patron to the Aged and Infirm Carpenters' Asylum between 1842 and 1847. A member of the Society of Irish Artists from 1845 to 1849 and an architect to the Trustees of the Royal Exchange between 1847 and 1851.

He lived in Blackrock at 3 Waltham Terrace from 1855 until he died on 10 January 1864. He was buried in the family plot at Glasnevin cemetery.

The parish priest of the Rathmines Church, William Meagher gave a eulogy of Byrne, “Of this gifted man whose talents and disinterested care have laid us under such obligations, of him who designed the portico of St Paul's and erected the majestic shrine of St Audoen's and the solemn cathedral-like pile of St James and the bold and beauteous dome of Our Lady of Refuge, of the accomplished and good and generous Patrick Byrne how truly may it not be said that he regarded the beauties of classical and mediaeval art with equal reverence, studied their several excellencies with equal assiduity & wrought upon the principles of both with equally supereminent success.”

== Selection of works ==
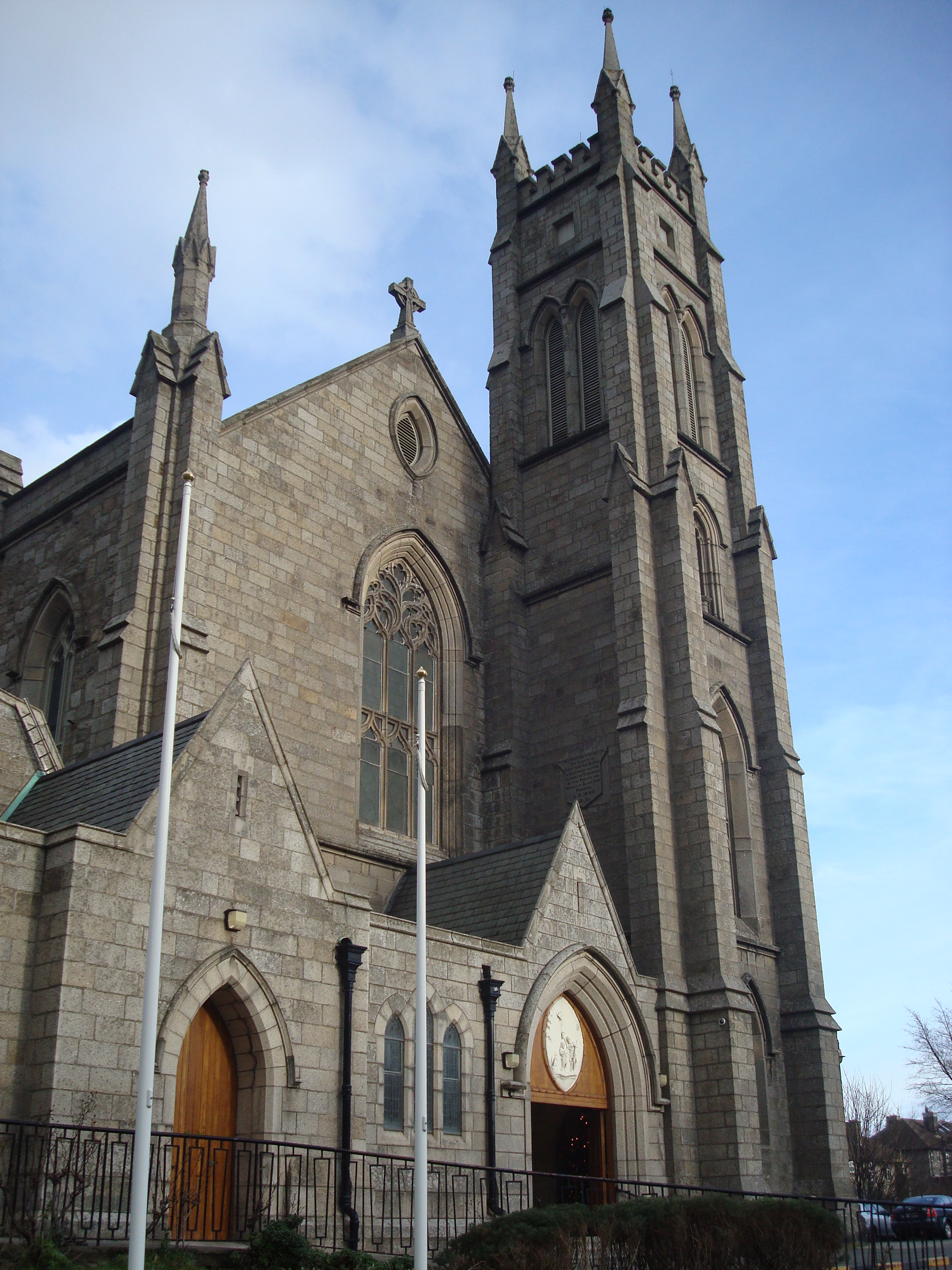
St. John The Baptist, Blackrock

A selection of works by Patrick Byrne in chronological order.

=== Churches ===
- St. Paul's, Arran Quay, Dublin (1835–1841)
- St. Audoen's, High Street, Dublin (1841–1852)
- St. John the Baptist, Blackrock, Dublin (1842–1845)
- St. James, James's Street, Dublin (1844–1854)
- Mary Immaculate Refuge of Sinners, Rathmines, Dublin (1850–1856)
- Church of the Immaculate Conception (Adam and Eve's), Merchant's Quay, Dublin (1852)
- St. Assam's Church, Raheny, Dublin (1859–1864)
- St. Nicholas of Myra (Without), Francis Street, Dublin (1860) Major enhancements to the existing church

=== Other buildings ===
- Queen's Royal Theatre, Pearse Street, Dublin (1858)
