= Church of the Immaculate Conception, Dublin =

Adam and Eve's
- Church of the Immaculate Conception
- Mainistir na bProinsiasach, Ádhamh agus Éabha
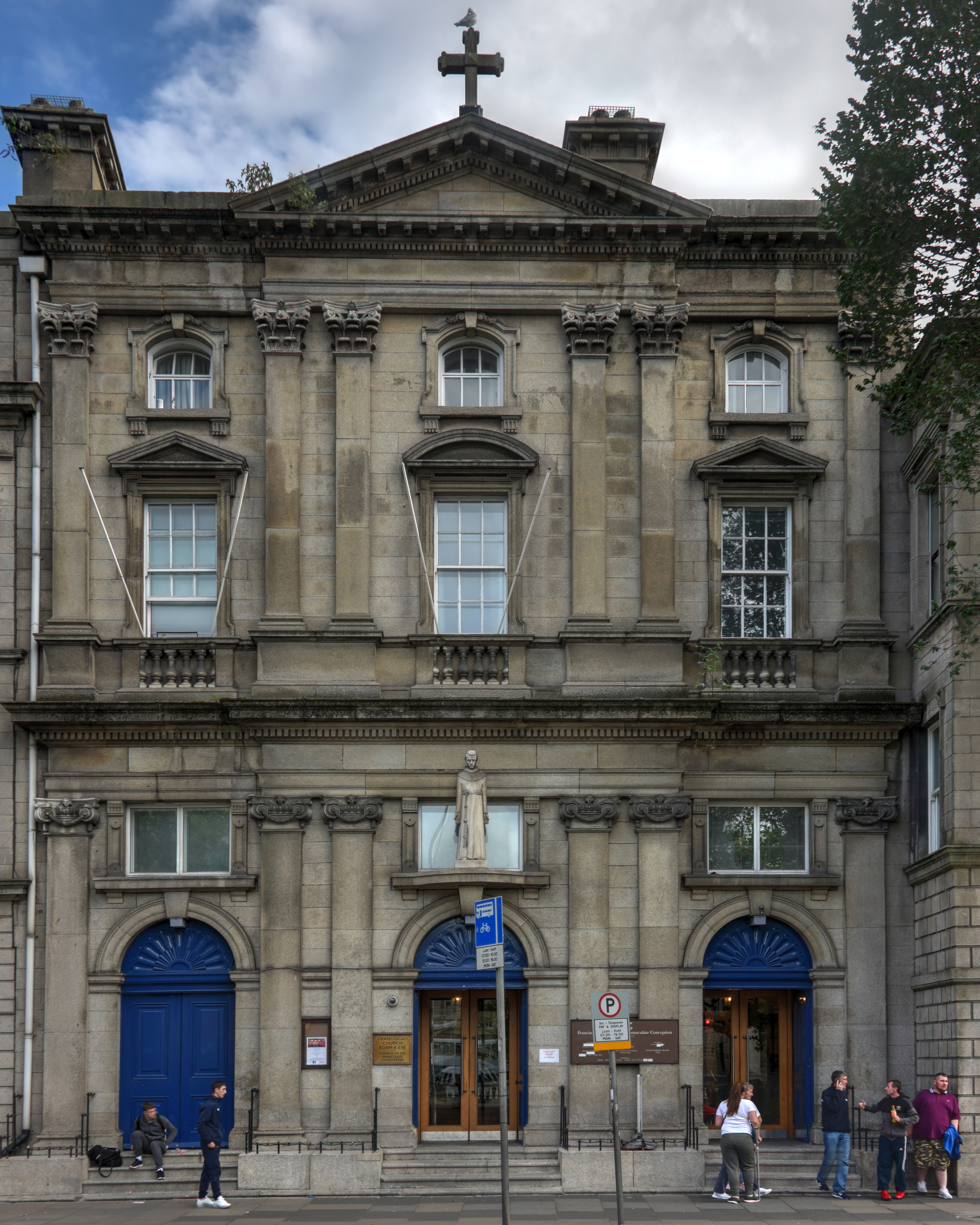
- The Merchants Quay entrance

- 53°20′41″N 6°16′22″W
- Location: 4 Merchant's Quay, Dublin
- Country: Ireland
- Language: English
- Denomination: Catholic
- Tradition: Roman Rite
- Website: www.franciscans.ie/our-friaries/present-friaries/dublin-adam-and-eves/

History
- Founded: 1834
- Dedication: Immaculate Conception
- Dedicated: 1889

Architecture
- Architect(s): 1834 Patrick Byrne; 1912 Doolin, Butler and Donnelly
- Completed: 1938

Administration
- Archdiocese: Dublin
- Deanery: South City Centre
- Parish: Merchant's Quay

The Church of the Immaculate Conception, also known as Adam and Eve's, is a Roman Catholic church run by the Franciscans and it is located on Merchants Quay, Dublin.

== History ==
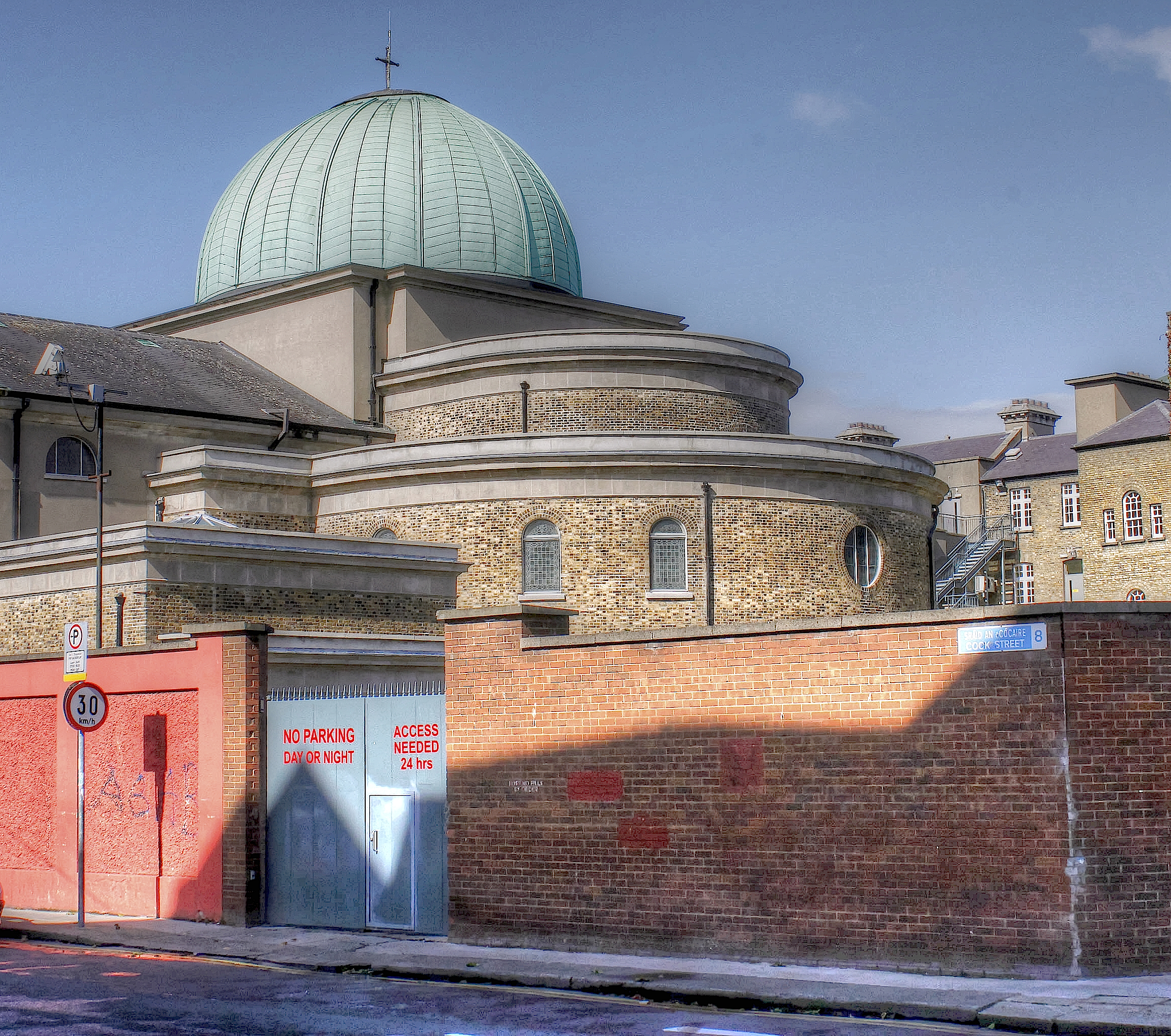
The dome visible from Cook Street

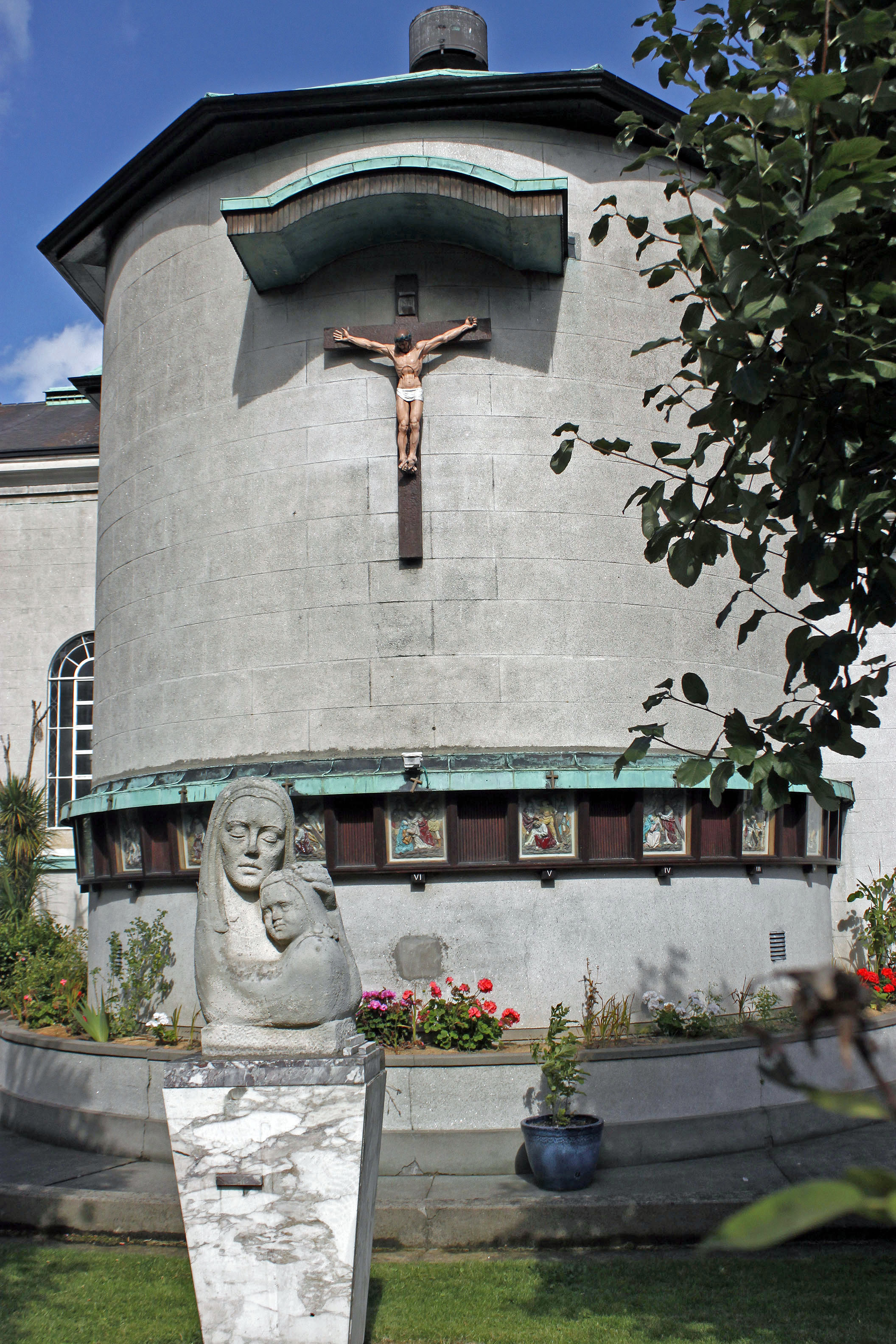
Decoration on the exterior of the west wall.

During the Dissolution reign of King Henry VIII around 1540 the Friary at Francis Street, the site of the current church of St. Nicholas of Myra (Without), Francis Street, was confiscated and the community was dispersed. In 1615 a new friary was built on Cook Street. A chapel on the site was destroyed in 1619 and later rebuilt. The Franciscans secretly said Mass in the Adam and Eve Tavern, where the popular name of the present church comes from. In 1759 a newer church was built, which was later replaced by the current church.

After the Catholic Emancipation in 1829, they set about building a church and laid the foundation stone of the current church in 1834. The original design was by the architect Patrick Byrne who planned a tower on the Merchant's Quay entrance. However, due to financial problems, the church was built without a nave or tower.

The church was originally dedicated to Saint Francis but in 1889 it was rededicated to the Immaculate Conception of Our Lady.

After 1900, the church was reorganised with the moving of the altar to the left wall and the original sanctuary was changed into a transept and entrance from Cook Street. A small nave was added to the right and a dome was built over the sanctuary.

In 1912 a shrine to Saint Anthony was built in 1912 to designs by the architects Doolin, Butler and Donnelly.

In 1926 to celebrate the seventh centenary of Saint Francis, the friars built a circular apse, remodelled the transepts and extended the nave with an entrance to Skippers Alley. The consecration of the high altar took place on 21 September 1928 by Dr. Paschal Robinson, titular Archbishop of Tyana (1870–1948).

Since 1930, the church has had an association with the 61st Dublin Scouting Ireland Group.

== Organ ==
The organ of Adam and Eve's was built by T.W. Magahy in 1936 using pipework from the old Telford organ there. It was rebuilt in 1996 by Trevor Crowe Ltd. There are around 3,000 pipes in the organ, seventy of which are gilded and incorporated into the casework. It is claimed to be the largest pipe organ in a Catholic church in Dublin and is very highly regarded. Eoin Tierney M.A., B.A. (Mus) was the first organ scholar of Adam and Eve’s Church Dublin.

== Literary references ==
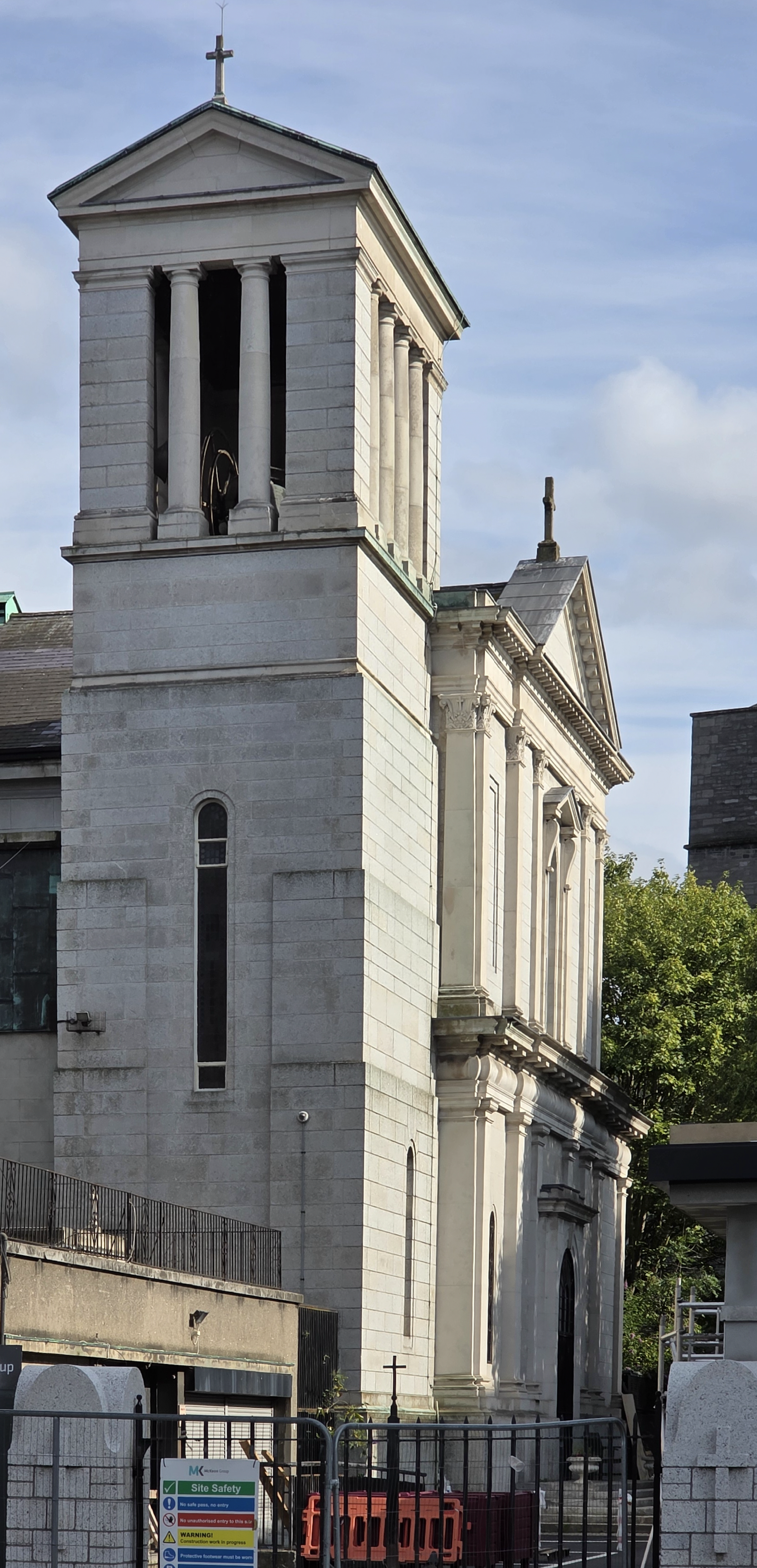
Original Greek Revival facade

Adam and Eve's is mentioned several times in James Joyce's novel Ulysses:

—But they are afraid the pillar will fall, Stephen went on. They see the roofs and argue about where the different churches are: Rathmines’ blue dome, Adam and Eve’s, saint Laurence O’Toole’s. But it makes them giddy to look so they pull up their skirts...

— "Aeolus" episode

And calling himself a Frenchy for the shawls, Joseph Manuo, and talking against the Catholic religion, and he serving mass in Adam and Eve’s when he was young with his eyes shut, who wrote the new testament, and the old testament, and hugging and smugging.

— "Cyclops" episode

What points of contact existed between these languages and between the peoples who spoke them? The presence of guttural sounds, diacritic aspirations, epenthetic and servile letters in both languages: their antiquity, both having been taught on the plain of Shinar 242 years after the deluge in the seminary instituted by Fenius Farsaigh, descendant of Noah, progenitor of Israel, and ascendant of Heber and Heremon, progenitors of Ireland: their archaeological, genealogical, hagiographical, exegetical, homiletic, toponomastic, historical and religious literatures comprising the works of rabbis and culdees, Torah, Talmud (Mischna and Ghemara), Massor, Pentateuch, Book of the Dun Cow, Book of Ballymote, Garland of Howth, Book of Kells: their dispersal, persecution, survival and revival: the isolation of their synagogical and ecclesiastical rites in ghetto (S. Mary’s Abbey) and masshouse (Adam and Eve’s tavern): the proscription of their national costumes in penal laws and jewish dress acts: the restoration in Chanah David of Zion and the possibility of Irish political autonomy or devolution.

— "Ithaca" episode

It is also briefly mentioned in "The Dead" from Dubliners: "Miss Julia, though she was quite gray, was still the leading soprano in Adam and Eve's..."

And the church's site by the River Liffey gave the famous opening lines of Finnegans Wake (1939): riverrun, past Eve and Adam’s, from swerve of shore to bend of bay, brings us by a commodius vicus of recirculation back to Howth Castle and Environs.
