= Church of St Nicholas of Myra Without, (Roman Catholic) =

St. Nicholas of Myra (Without)
- St. Nicholas of Myra (Without), Francis Street
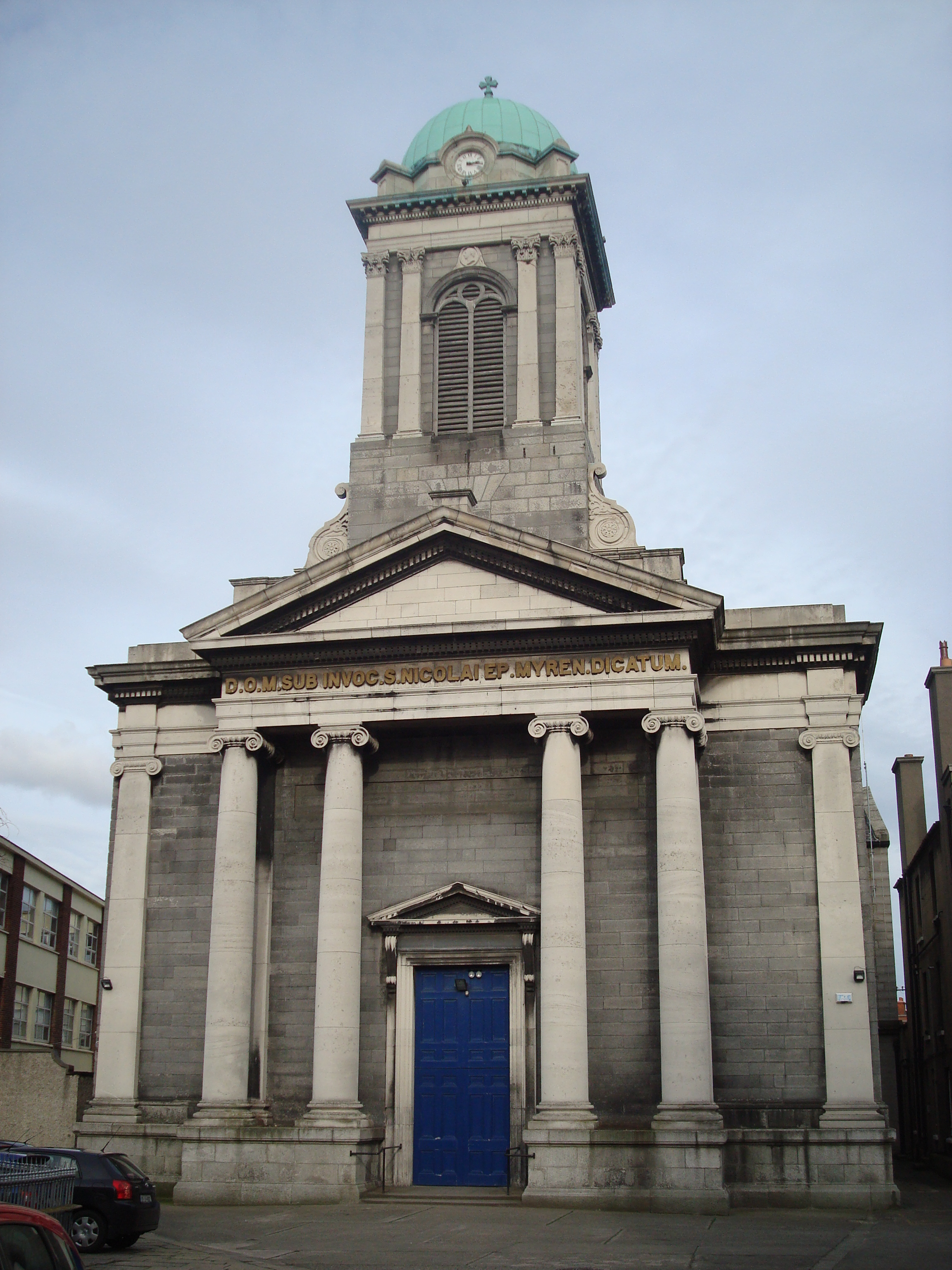
- St. Nicholas of Myra (Without)
- 53.341108°N 6.273888°W
- Location: Francis Street; Dublin
- Country: Ireland
- Denomination: Roman Catholic
- Website: francisstreetparish.ie

History
- Dedication: Saint Nicholas
- Dedicated: 1835

Architecture
- Architect: John Lesson; Patrick Byrne
- Architectural type: Church
- Style: Greek Revival
- Groundbreaking: 1829

Administration
- Archdiocese: Dublin
- Deanery: South City Centre
- Parish: Francis Street Parish

The Church of St Nicholas of Myra (Without) is an Irish Roman Catholic church on Francis Street, Dublin. The site has been used as a place of worship as far back as the 12th century. The current church was built in 1829 and dedicated to Saint Nicholas in 1835.

== History ==
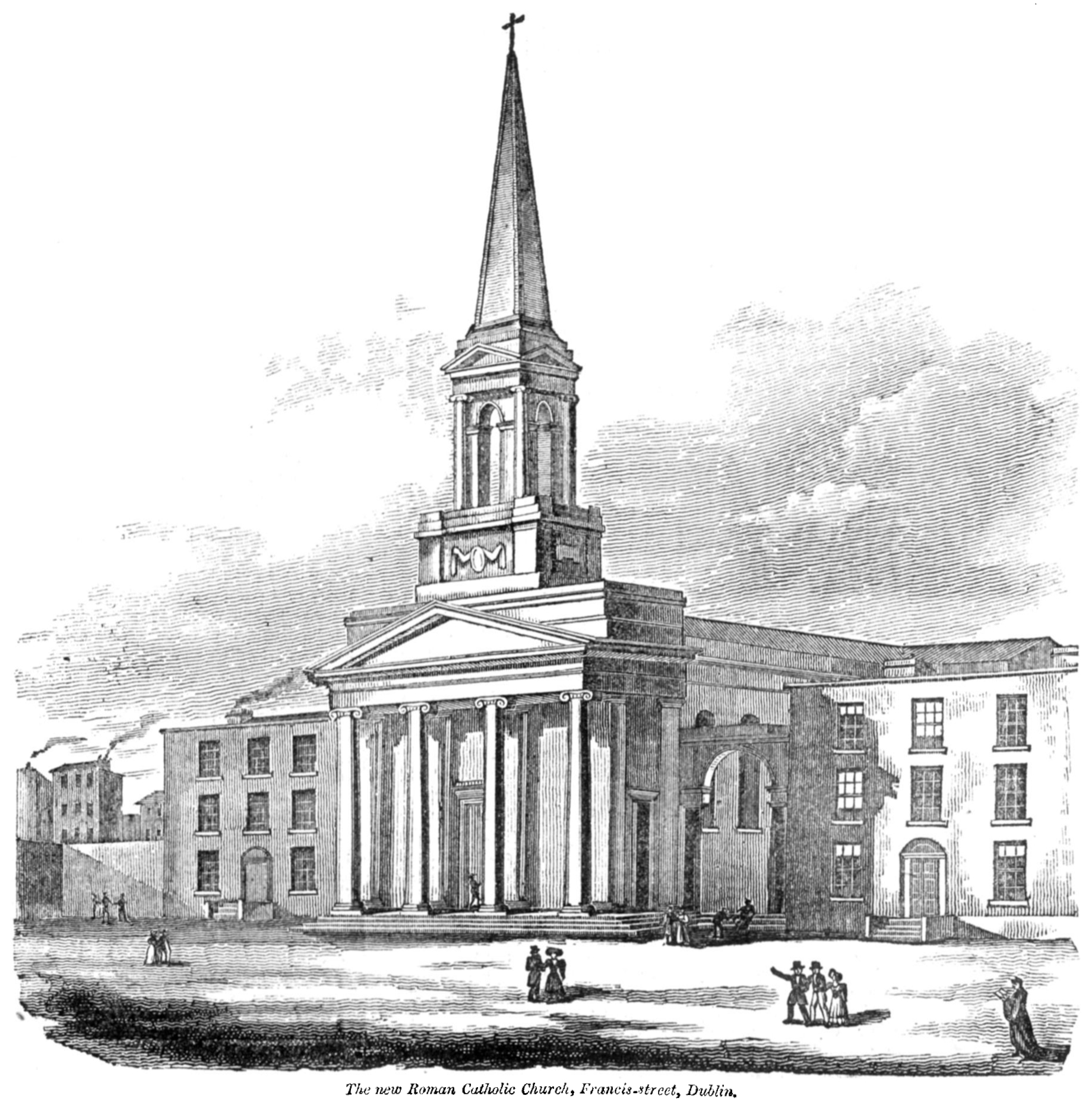
This picture from the Dublin Penny Journal of 1832, shows how the church originally looked with its spire before the alterations in 1860

On the site where the current church stands, a wooden chapel once existed around the 12th century. It was later demolished and a stone church and Franciscan monastery were built after the arrival in Ireland of the Franciscan order in 1233. In 1235 John le Porter provided the land and King Henry III contributed 50 marks towards the construction. The completed church was dedicated to St. Francis of Assisi, from where the neighbouring street got its name. The stone church was then destroyed during the Dissolution reign of Henry VIII around the 1540s.

During the 17th century, the Franciscans acquired the land for their own use, but they had to reconsider their plans due to the fallout of the Popish Plot by Titus Oates in 1678.

The current church was built to serve as the Metropolitan Church for Irish Catholic Archbishops by Archbishop Patrick Russell, replacing the church in Limerick Lane. Limerick Lane connected Francis Street and Patrick Street.

The first architect of the church was John Leeson. The building commenced in 1829, opened in 1834 and was dedicated in 1835.

In 1860, the architect Patrick Byrne was commissioned to enhance the church. He added the main exterior features of the church such as the ionic portico, pediment, bell tower and cupola.

Three statues once stood on the pediment depicting Our Lady, Saint Patrick and Saint Nicholas. At the feet of Saint Nicholas, there were three golden balls to symbolise charity and an anchor to symbolise hope.
