= James Fitzwilliam =

Irish judge and landowner

James Fitzwilliam (died 1420) was an Irish landowner and judge who held the office of Chief Baron of the Irish Exchequer. He was the ancestor of the prominent Dublin landowning family which acquired the titles Viscount FitzWilliam and Earl of Tyrconnell.

He was the son of Hugh Fitzwilliam. The Fitzwilliam family are recorded in Dublin from about 1210. By the time of James' birth, they were already considerable landowners in Dublin, with their estates centred on Dundrum and Swords.

Few details of his legal career survive, but it is known that he was Chief Baron by 1413 and was superseded in 1417.

== Family and descendants ==
He married, after 1390, a daughter of Sir John Cruys or Cruise (died 1407) and his wife Matilda Verdon of Clonmore (now Togher), County Meath, one of several marriages between the two families, and had at least one son, Phillip. Cruys was a distinguished diplomat and military commander and a major landowner in Dublin, who held the manors of Mount Merrion, Stillorgan and Thorncastle, which comprise roughly modern Booterstown. Merrion Castle, Sir John's principal dwelling, subsequently became the main Fitzwilliam residence, although Sir John had a son, Sir Thomas Cruys, who inherited his estates, and at his death in 1424 left two sons, Edward and Christopher. Whereas Sir John was forgiven payment of the Crown rent on his estates, due to the devastation of his lands by Irish clans from County Wicklow, the Fitzwilliams were assessed at £5 and 8 shillings a year. In 1406 there were complaints that James was unlawfully intruding into the Cruys estates at Merrion and Thorncastle, and alienating property there, but he received a royal pardon. Probably, in anticipation of Cruys's death, he was attempting to assert his ownership against the rightful heir.

James died in 1420, and his lands passed to his son, Phillip, who was still a minor; the family estates are said to have suffered serious depredations during his minority. He was a ward of his father's successor as Chief Baron, James Cornwalsh; ironically Cornwalsh was murdered 20 years later in a private war with the Fitzwilliam family over the disputed possession of Baggotrath Castle, although Philip himself was not, as far as is known, personally involved in the feud, which was carried on mainly by his cousin William Fitzwilliam and William's wife Ismay Perrers.

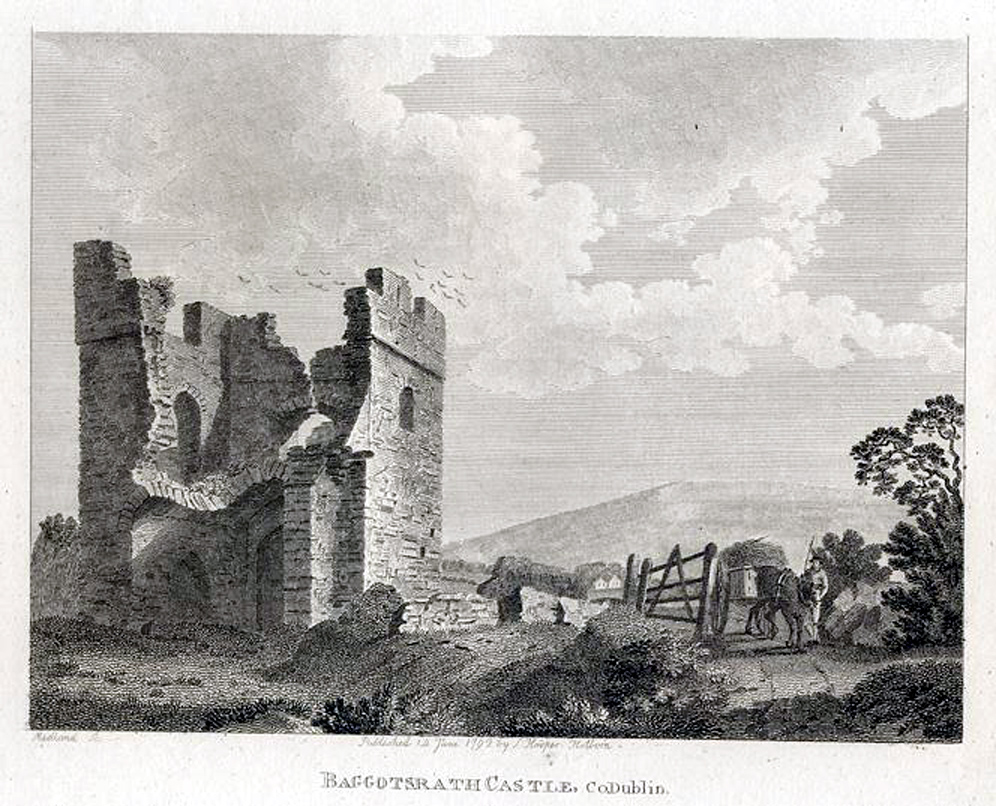
Baggotrath Castle, c.1790

Philip lived mainly at Thorncastle (his cousin Edward Cruys had died by 1432, although Edward did have a brother Christopher) which he rebuilt in 1437 after it was burnt in a raid by one of the Gaelic clans of County Wicklow. He received a grant from the English Crown for the necessary works, presumably because it was an important part of the city's defences. During the early stages of the Wars of the Roses, he was described as a "counsellor" to King Henry VI of England. Later he changed his allegiance and sided decisively with the House of York, giving good service against King Henry and his allies. Thorncastle passed to his son and heir Stephen, who was living there in 1463.
