= Merrion Street =

Street in central Dublin, Ireland

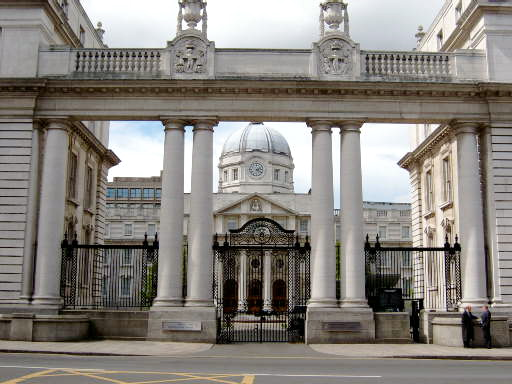
- Government Buildings on Merrion Street, formerly the Royal College of Science

- Location within Central Dublin
- Native name: Sráid Mhuirfean (Irish)
- Namesake: Merrion Castle, seat of the Viscounts FitzWilliam
- Length: 450 m (1,480 ft)
- Width: 30 metres (98 ft)
- Location: Dublin, Ireland
- Postal code: D02
- Coordinates: 53°20′20″N 6°15′10″W
- north end: Lincoln Place; Fenian Street
- south end: Merrion Row; Ely Place; Baggot Street Lower

Construction
- Commissioned: 1723

Other
- Known for: Government Buildings; Georgian Architecture

Merrion Street (/ˈmɛriːən/; Irish: Sráid Mhuirfean) is a major Georgian street on the southside of Dublin, Ireland, which runs along one side of Merrion Square. It is divided into Merrion Street Lower (north end), Merrion Square West and Merrion Street Upper (south end). It holds one entrance to the seat of the Irish Parliament, the Oireachtas, major government offices and two major cultural institutions.

== Name ==
The street and square are named after Oliver FitzWilliam, 1st Earl of Tyrconnell who lived at Merrion Castle.

The term "Merrion Street" is often used as a metanym for the Irish Government in the same way as Whitehall or Downing Street are used to refer to the British Government. The official Irish Government news service website is merrionstreet.ie.

== Features ==
The garden entrance of Leinster House, formerly Kildare House, the seat of a major aristocratic house, is located on the street as is Irish Government Buildings, formerly the Royal College of Science for Ireland, and the main location of the Department of the Taoiseach and other arms of government.

Between these is the National Museum of Ireland – Natural History which opened in 1857, and beyond Leinster House is the main entrance to the National Gallery of Ireland.

== History ==
The street was commissioned by statute in 1752 by John Ensor for the FitzWilliam Estate, who would go on to lay out the neighbouring Fitzwilliam Square, Holles Street, Clare Street, Wentworth Place, and Denzille Street. It was laid out to run parallel with Kildare Street.

The street narrows at the southern end where it meets Merrion Row and Baggot Street as there was no cohesive planning between the land owners and their estates at that time. The street was originally lined on both sides by Georgian houses. Some reports suggest that Field Marshal The 1st Duke of Wellington was born in his family’s Mornington House on the street. The house is now a hotel.

Between 1904 and 1922, all the houses on one side of the street were demolished and replaced by the Royal College of Science for Ireland, which became Government Buildings and was designed by Sir Aston Webb. A joint press meeting was held between Enda Kenny and British Prime Minister Theresa May in Merrion Street on 30 January 2017, to discuss the implications of Brexit on Northern Ireland and Ireland.

== See also ==
- List of streets and squares in Dublin
