= Thomas Fitzwilliam (disambiguation) =

Thomas Fitzwilliam (died 1497) was Speaker of the House of Commons of England.

Thomas Fitzwilliam may also refer to:

- Thomas Arthur Fitzwilliam, Irish physician
- Thomas FitzWilliam, 1st Viscount FitzWilliam (1581–1650), Viscount FitzWilliam
- Thomas FitzWilliam, 4th Viscount FitzWilliam (died 1704), Viscount FitzWilliam
- Thomas FitzWilliam, 9th Viscount FitzWilliam, Viscount FitzWilliam

== See also ==
- Fitzwilliam (disambiguation)
