= Fitzwilliam (surname) =

Fitzwilliam (or FitzWilliam), lit. "Son of William", is derived from the Anglo-Norman prefix Fitz (pronounced "fits") often used in patronymic surnames of Anglo-Norman origin; that is to say originating in the 11th century (the word is a Norman French noun literally meaning "Son of", from the Latin filius (for 'son'), plus genitive case of the father's forename); and from William, lit. "Willpower/Desire Protector", which is a popular given name of old Germanic origin, became very popular in the English language after the Norman conquest of England in 1066, and remained so throughout the Middle Ages and into the modern era). While more popular as a surname, it does have some popularity as a given name.

"Fitzwilliam"/"FitzWilliam" may also refer to:

== Persons ==
- Richard FitzWilliam, 5th Viscount FitzWilliam (1677–1743), Irish nobleman and politician
- Richard FitzWilliam, 7th Viscount FitzWilliam (1745–1816)
- Thomas Fitzwilliam (disambiguation)
- Wendy Fitzwilliam (born 1972), Trinidad and Tobago's second Miss Universe
- William Fitzwilliam, 4th Earl Fitzwilliam (1748–1833), British statesman

== Fictional characters ==
=== Given Name ===
- Fitzwilliam Darcy, a major character in Jane Austen's novel Pride and Prejudice

=== Surname ===
- Claude Fitzwilliam, title character in the 1967 American romantic comedy film Fitzwilly starring Dick Van Dyke, with Barbara Feldon in her first feature-film role.
- Colonel Fitzwilliam, a minor character in Jane Austen's Pride and Prejudice.
- Reggie Fitzwilliam, a character in the television show The Strain.

== See also ==
- Earl Fitzwilliam, a title in the Peerage of Ireland and the Peerage of Great Britain
- Viscount FitzWilliam, a title in the Peerage of Ireland
- Fitzwilliam Virginal Book, source of keyboard music in the Elizabethan and Jacobean periods in England
