= List of vice-admirals of Leinster =

Vice Admiral of Leinster
- Country: United Kingdom
- Type: Naval administration
- Role: Admiralty court and Naval Jurisdiction.

This is a list of the vice-admirals of Leinster, a province in mid-Ireland.

Prior to 1585 the whole of Ireland was served by a single vice-admiral, namely Thomas Radcliffe, 3rd Earl of Sussex (1558–1565), Gerald Fitzgerald, 11th Earl of Kildare (1564–1573) and Thomas Butler, 10th Earl of Ormonde (1585). Separate vice-admiralties were then established for Munster in 1585, for Ulster by 1602, for Leinster by 1612 and for Connaught by 1615.

== Vice-admirals of Leinster ==
Source (1612–1660)

Source (1661–):

- 1585–1612 no appointment known
- 1612–1614 Thomas Butler, 10th Earl of Ormonde
- 1614–1625 no appointment known
- 1625–1635 Adam Loftus, 1st Viscount Loftus
- 1635 Sir Robert Loftus
- 1640 Sir George Wentworth
- 1640–1647 no appointment known
- 1647– Sir Arthur Loftus
- 1647–1660 no appointment known
- 1660–1667? Sir George Wentworth
- 1668–1689 Hon. Carey Dillon
- 1691 Henry Wallop
- 1692–1701 John Granville, 1st Earl of Bath
- 1702 John Granville
- 1708–1710 Philip Savage
- 1710 John Allen
- 1711–1714 Philip Savage (died 1717)
- 1714–1728 Richard Fitzwilliam, 5th Viscount Fitzwilliam
- 1728–1776 Richard FitzWilliam, 6th Viscount FitzWilliam
- 1777–1816 Richard FitzWilliam, 7th Viscount FitzWilliam
- 1822–1838 James Wandesford Butler, 19th Earl of Ormonde
- <1847–1874 Sir Thomas St Lawrence, 3rd Earl of Howth
- 1874-1892 Henry Moore, 3rd Marquess of Drogheda
