= William FitzWilliam, 3rd Viscount FitzWilliam =

Irish nobleman

William FitzWilliam
- Viscount FitzWilliam
- Coat of arms
- Tenure: 1667–1670
- Predecessor: Oliver FitzWilliam, 2nd Viscount FitzWilliam
- Successor: Thomas FitzWilliam, 4th Viscount FitzWilliam

William FitzWilliam, 3rd Viscount FitzWilliam (c.1610–1674) was an Irish nobleman of the Stuart period. He fought on the Royalist side during the English Civil War, but later made his peace with the Cromwellian regime. In his later years, he openly professed the Roman Catholic faith, which was then illegal.

== Background ==
He was born at Merrion Castle, which was situated at present-day Mount Merrion, Dublin, the youngest son of Thomas FitzWilliam, 1st Viscount FitzWilliam and Margaret Plunkett, daughter of Oliver Plunkett, 4th Baron Louth and Frances Bagenal. The FitzWilliam family were first recorded in Ireland about 1210, and by the seventeenth century they had become among the largest landowners in Dublin. They had a record of loyalty to the English Crown, and the viscountcy was conferred on the elder Thomas in 1629 by Charles I in recognition of his good services to the Royal cause. The title did not come cheap, since the Crown expected financial help in return, and the Fitzwilliam estates were mortgaged in the 1630s to cover the cost of the family's gifts to the Crown.

== Civil War and Restoration ==
As a young man William appears to have lived very much in the shadow of his elder brother Oliver FitzWilliam, 1st Earl of Tyrconnell. When Oliver became a Colonel in the French Army, William was his lieutenant. Both gained the trust of Charles I of England, and while Oliver returned to fight in Ireland, William became Governor of Whitchurch and Lieutenant General for Shropshire.

When it became clear that the Royalist cause was lost, Oliver and William both made their peace with Oliver Cromwell and in 1655, after the deaths of their father and their eldest brother Richard, a portion of the family lands were restored to them. Before the fighting became serious, William and his wife and family had lived at Dundrum Castle, but they were driven out in 1642, returning again in 1646. In about 1652, the Fitzwilliams left Dundrum for good. Their later home was Simmonscourt Castle, in present-day Ballsbridge, where they were living shortly after the Restoration of Charles II. Some ruins of Simmonscourt Castle remain.

In 1667 on Oliver's death, the third brother Christopher having predeceased him, William became the 3rd Viscount Fitzwilliam. As Oliver had no children the Earldom died with him. William enjoyed his title for only three years. He seems to have preferred to live in Dublin City rather than at Merrion Castle, which was then some distance from the city. He died at his townhouse in the parish of St. Nicholas Within, near Christ Church Cathedral, whose bells at his request were rung on his death in 1674.

== Religion ==
Encouraged perhaps by Charles II's well-known inclination to the Catholic Church, which he entered on his deathbed, William, despite the Penal Laws, openly practised his Roman Catholic faith. At his death, he was attended by several Catholic priests, and though like his brother Oliver he was buried in Donnybrook Church the burial service was conducted according to the Catholic rite. His son and heir Thomas was also an open Catholic, while his daughters married into untitled Catholic landowning families rather than the Protestant nobility (except Catherine, who married into the titled Netterville family).

== Family ==
William married Mary Luttrell, daughter of Thomas Luttrell of Luttrellstown Castle and his second wife Alison St Lawrence, daughter of Nicholas St Lawrence, 9th Baron Howth. Mary died c. 1673. They had six children

- Thomas FitzWilliam, 4th Viscount FitzWilliam
- Mary, who married John Browne of Clongowes Wood, County Kildare
- Rose, who married Christopher Malpas of Winston
- Margaret, who married James Crawley
- Catherine, who married Nicholas Netterville, a grandson of the 1st Viscount Netterville
- Dorothy, who married Thomas Meagher.

Peerage of Ireland
| Preceded by Oliver FitzWilliam | Viscount FitzWilliam; 1667–1670 | Succeeded by Thomas FitzWilliam |
