= John Wainwright (judge) =

John Wainwright (1689-1741) was an English-born barrister who became a much-loved judge in Ireland: he was celebrated for his charm and classical learning as well as his legal ability.

He was born in Chester, elder son of Thomas Wainwright (died 1720), Chancellor of the Diocese of Chester, and his wife Rebecca Jackson: they married in 1686. His grandfather John Wainwright (died 1686) had also been Chancellor of Chester, and John erected a memorial to his father and grandfather in Chester Cathedral. He seems to have had some interest in ecclesiastical law, and possessed a casebook of Ecclesiastical Court cases, which still exists.

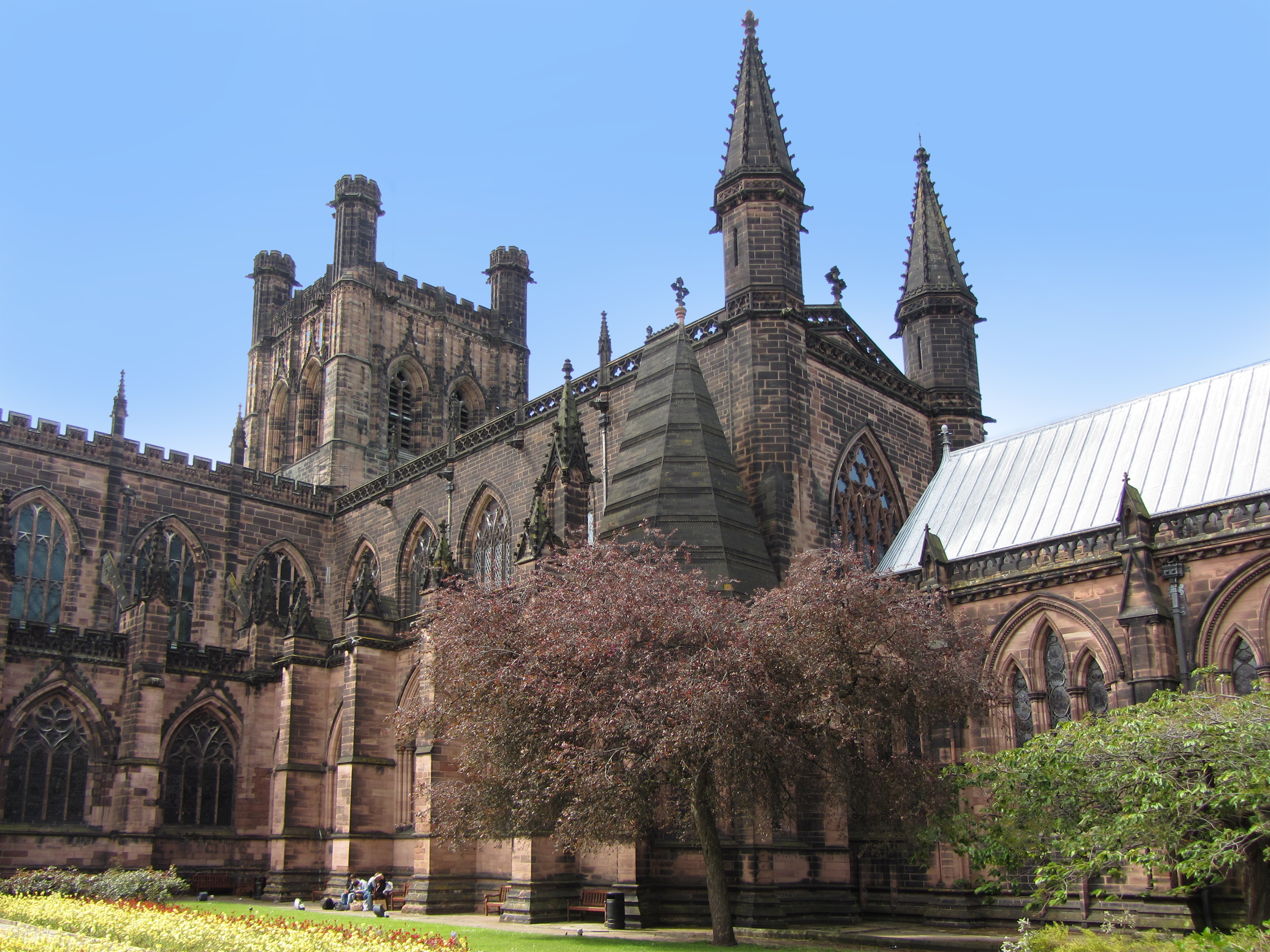
Chester Cathedral

He was educated at Westminster School and Christ Church, Oxford, where he gained a reputation for outstanding scholarship. He entered the Inner Temple in 1708 and was called to the Bar in 1716. Despite his intellectual gifts, his legal practice did not flourish, and at one point he was contemplating a move to the West Indies. On the other hand, his charm and learning made him a favourite at Court: he had a position in the household of Frederick, Prince of Wales, and was a friend of the future Prime Minister, the Duke of Newcastle, who had been at Westminster with him, and of the influential Royal favourite Charlotte Clayton, Baroness Sundon. In 1730 he received an appointment, possibly a sinecure, to the Stannary Courts of Cornwall. In 1732 he was sent to Ireland as the third Baron of the Court of Exchequer (Ireland).

The third Baron, despite his junior rank, held a surprisingly lucrative position as he received fees for the swearing of affidavits, and Wainwright, after his long struggle to make a living at the English bar, guarded his perquisites jealously, fighting any suggestion that he be promoted to a more senior but less well-remunerated office. Even when the Government, which wished to find a seat on the Bench for the Solicitor General for Ireland, put pressure on him to accept promotion, he firmly resisted.

Wainwright quickly became as popular in Ireland as he had been at home. He made numerous friends, including Lord Chancellor Jocelyn, George Berkeley and Jonathan Swift. He lived at Mount Merrion House, south of Dublin city, which he rented from Viscount FitzWilliam, and wrote enthusiastically about the house and surrounding countryside.

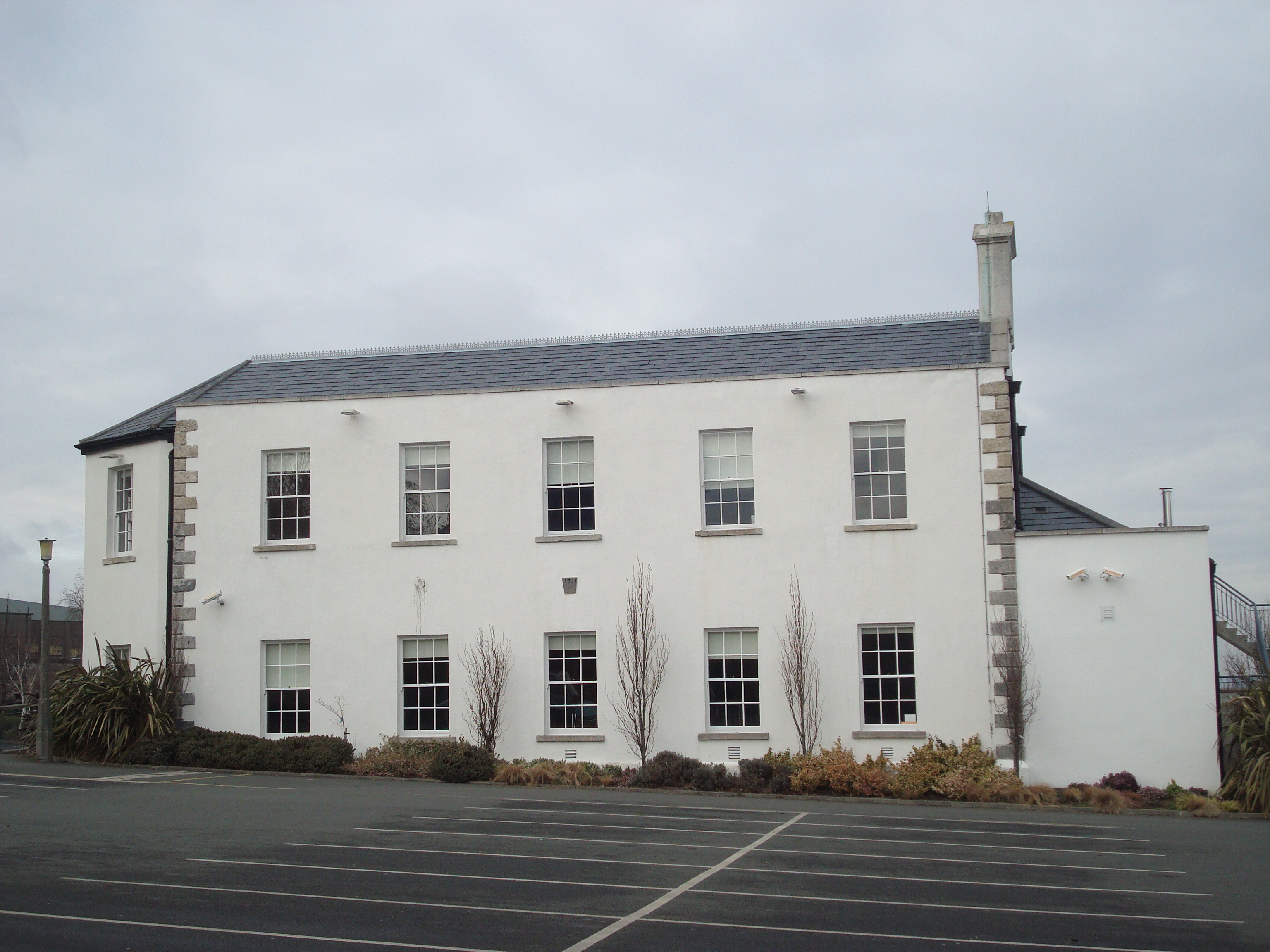
Remnant of Mount Merrion House, south Dublin, which Wainwright rented from Lord FitzWilliam

During the Irish Famine (1740-1741), Wainwright was noted for his charity to the sick and starving. He continued conscientiously to perform his judicial duties, despite the highly infectious fever which was rampant in the Famine years. He was warned by friends as to the dangers he was incurring by going on circuit; as they rightly predicted "some misfortune may befall". Wainwright however evidently thought that it was his duty to go: "he had the right to decline" Lord Jocelyn, the Lord Chancellor of Ireland and a close friend, wrote anxiously, "but accepted on a principle of humanity". While on assize in Munster in the spring of 1741 he fell seriously ill of the fever, and was brought back to Dublin, where he died at Mount Merrion in early April. He is buried at St Mary's Church, Stockport. An Irish elegy paid eloquent tribute to his qualities: "a steady heart, discerning and discreet, in temper candid and in manner sweet". Lord Jocelyn a few weeks earlier had written that his death "would be a great loss to me on account of our particular friendship", and also to the public, as he had the ability to be an outstanding judge, and was still just over fifty years old.

He married in 1726 Anne Parsons, daughter of the wealthy brewer and Member of Parliament Sir John Parsons of Reigate and his second wife Jane Milward. They had no children.

== Sources ==
- Ball, F. Elrington The Judges in Ireland 1221-1921 London John Murray 1926
- Ball, F. Elrington Mount Merrion and its History (1898) Journal of the Royal Society of Antiquaries of Ireland 5th Series Vol. 8 p. 329
- Diary of Dr Thomas Cartwright, Bishop of Chester Reprinted by Wipf and Stock 2020
- Faulkner's Dublin Journal 1741
- Kelly, Richard J. The Courts, Judges and Legal Office-Holders of Ireland in 1739 (1904) Journal of the Royal Society of Antiquaries of Ireland 5th Series Vol.35 p. 20
- Summary of Catalogue of Manuscripts in the Church Representative Library Dublin
