= Thomas FitzWilliam, 4th Viscount FitzWilliam =

Irish nobleman and statesman

Thomas FitzWilliam, 4th Viscount FitzWilliam (c.1640–1704) was an Irish nobleman and statesman; he was a leading Irish Jacobite, and a political figure of some importance during the Williamite War in Ireland.

== Background ==
He was the only son of William FitzWilliam, 3rd Viscount FitzWilliam and Mary Luttrell, daughter of Thomas Luttrell of Luttrellstown Castle. He was probably born at Dundrum Castle, where his parents lived in the early 1640s. After the Irish Rebellion of 1641 the FitzWilliams, who had previously been among the largest landowners in Dublin, were dispossessed of most of their lands. Thomas's father spent some years in France and fought for Charles I in England during the English Civil War, becoming Governor of Whitchurch. In 1655 William and his elder brother Oliver FitzWilliam, 1st Earl of Tyrconnell, having made their peace with the English Parliament, were allowed to recover part of the family estate. After the Restoration of Charles II the FitzWilliams, with their record of loyalty to the Crown, (apart perhaps from Oliver, who was accused of divided loyalties) were in high favour with the new regime, and recovered the remainder of their lands including their main seat, Merrion Castle. Thomas' father succeeded to the Viscountcy in 1667 and Thomas himself succeeded three years later (the Earldom became extinct on Oliver's death). He also inherited considerable estates in County Westmeath from his maternal uncle Thomas Luttrell.

== Religion and politics ==
Thomas's father was an open and devout Roman Catholic, who was attended at his death by several Catholic priests, and married his daughters into Catholic families. Thomas shared his father's religious beliefs: according to tradition he gave money for the building of a Catholic Mass house at Booterstown.

When James II succeeded to the throne Thomas enthusiastically supported his pro-Catholic policy and for the next few years he was a political figure of some importance. James appointed him to the Privy Council of Ireland, and made him a Commissioner of the Treasury. During the Williamite Wars, he was given a military command: in 1691 he raised a troop for the relief of the Siege of Limerick but was defeated in a clash with Williamite forces.

After the downfall of the Jacobite cause, Lord FitzWilliam was the subject of an Act of Attainder, but the attainder was later reversed, whether because of the family's record of loyalty to the Crown, or because of their wealth and influence, is unclear. He took his seat in the Irish House of Lords in 1695, but although he was willing to swear allegiance to William III, his conscience forbade him to join the Church of Ireland and he withdrew from the House. No further action was taken against him. He died, still in full possession of his estates, on 20 February 1704.

== Family ==
Lord FitzWilliam married firstly Mary Stapleton, daughter of the leading Parliamentarian Sir Philip Stapleton and his first wife Frances Hotham: this was a somewhat surprising marriage, given the deep divisions about religion and politics between the two families. They had one surviving son-

- Richard FitzWilliam, 5th Viscount FitzWilliam.

He married secondly Elizabeth Pitt, daughter of George Pitt of Strathfieldsaye and Lady Jane Savage, daughter of John Savage, 2nd Earl Rivers, who had been married twice before; George Pitt was a distant cousin of William Pitt the Elder, and himself a politician of some importance. They had one daughter-

- Mary, who married George Talbot and was the mother of nine children including-
  - George Talbot, 14th Earl of Shrewsbury

Peerage of Ireland
Preceded by William FitzWilliam	Viscount FitzWilliam; 1670–1704	Succeeded by Richard FitzWilliam
