= Richard FitzWilliam, 6th Viscount FitzWilliam =

Anglo-Irish peer and property developer

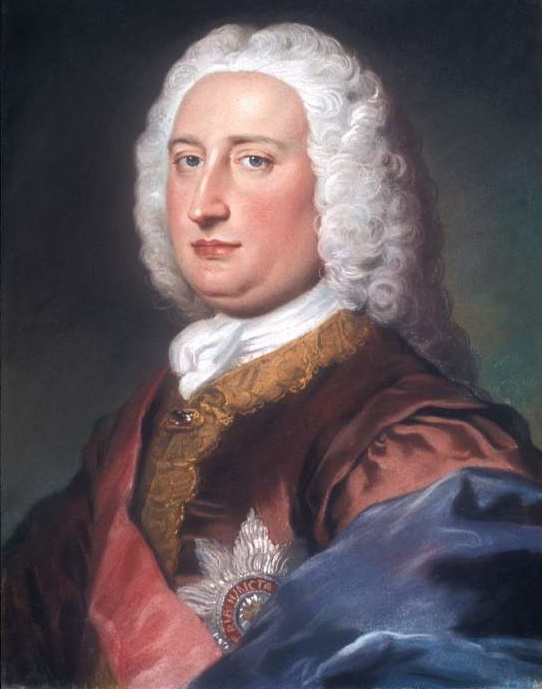
Richard FitzWilliam, 6th Viscount FitzWilliam, wearing the Star of the Order of the Bath. Portrait c.1744 by William Hoare. Fitzwilliam Museum, Cambridge

Arms of Fitwilliam: Lozengy argent and gules

Richard FitzWilliam, 6th Viscount FitzWilliam (24 July 1711 - 25 May 1776), KB, PC, FRS, of Mount Merrion, near Dublin, Ireland, was an Anglo-Irish peer and property developer.

He was a grandson of Sir John Shelley, 3rd Baronet. He served as the Vice-Admiral of Leinster and was elected a Fellow of the Royal Society. He temporarily moved to Richmond Green in Surrey, but eventually returned to his family's principal seat in Mount Merrion, near Dublin.

== Origins ==
He was the eldest son and heir of Richard FitzWilliam, 5th Viscount FitzWilliam by his wife Frances Shelley, a daughter of Sir John Shelley, 3rd Baronet and his first wife Bridget Nevill.

== Career ==
He replaced his father as Vice-Admiral of Leinster in 1728. He succeeded his father in the viscountcy in 1743 and took his seat in the Irish House of Lords. He was created a Knight Companion of the Order of the Bath (KB) in 1744 and was elected a Fellow of the Royal Society in 1747. He was sworn of the Irish Privy Council in 1766. He lived for a time at Richmond Green in Surrey with his father-in-law Sir Matthew Decker, 1st Baronet, but later moved back to Mount Merrion, the family's principal seat near Dublin.

== Marriage and children ==
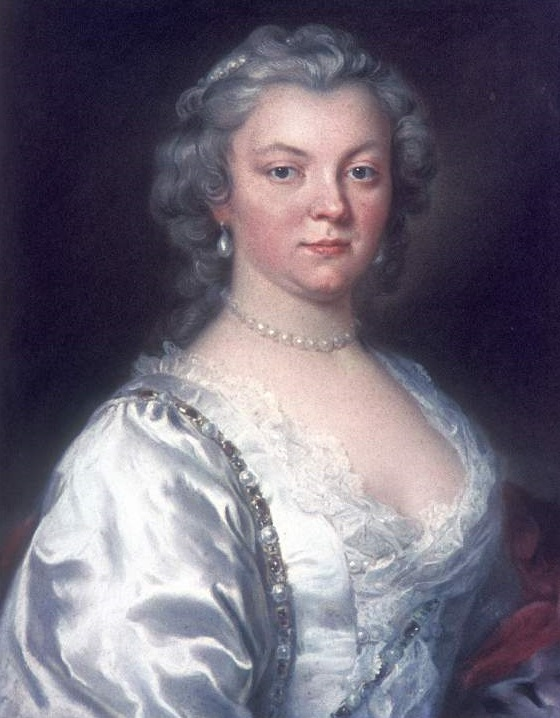
Catherine Decker, portrait c.1744 by William Hoare. Fitzwilliam Museum

On 3 May 1744, he married Catherine Decker, eldest daughter and co-heiress of Sir Matthew Decker, 1st Baronet, a wealthy merchant of Dutch origin, by his wife Henrietta Watkins, at Sir Matthew's house in St James's Square. Horace Walpole thought the marriage notable enough to mention in his correspondence. By Catherine he had issue including:

- Richard FitzWilliam, 7th Viscount FitzWilliam (c. 22 August 1745 - 1816), eldest son and heir, who inherited the Decker mansion and art collection at Richmond and died unmarried and without legitimate issue; by his will, he founded the Fitzwilliam Museum in Cambridge.
- William Fitzwilliam, (c. 18 September 1749 Richmond - pre-1816)
- John FitzWilliam, 8th Viscount Fitzwilliam, (c.21 Oct 1752 Richmond – 1830)
- Thomas FitzWilliam, 9th Viscount Fitzwilliam (c.3 September 1755 Richmond - January 1833)
- Henrietta FitzWilliam, (c. 16 October 1746 Richmond - )
- Mary FitzWilliam, (c. 20 August 1748, Richmond - )
- Hon. Catherine FitzWilliam, (c.30 Oct 1753 Richmond - )

== Death ==
Lord FitzWilliam died on 25 May 1776 at Mount Merrion and was buried at Donnybrook Cemetery.

Peerage of Ireland
Preceded by Richard FitzWilliam	Viscount FitzWilliam; 1743–1776	Succeeded by Richard Fitzwilliam
