= Fitzwilliam =

Fitzwilliam may refer to:

== People ==
- Fitzwilliam (surname), including a list of people with the name
- Earl Fitzwilliam, a title in the Peerage of Ireland and the Peerage of Great Britain
- Viscount FitzWilliam, a title in the Peerage of Ireland

== Places ==
- Fitzwilliam, West Yorkshire, England
  - Fitzwilliam railway station
- Fitzwilliam, New Hampshire, U.S.
- Fitzwilliam Strait, a waterway through the central Canadian Arctic Archipelago
- Fitzwilliam Square, Dublin, Ireland
- Mount Fitzwilliam, in the Canadian Rockies

== Other uses ==
- Fitzwilliam College, Cambridge, a constituent colleges of the University of Cambridge, England
  - Fitzwilliam Museum, the art and antiquities museum of the University of Cambridge
- Fitzwilliam Darcy, a fictional character from Jane Austen's Pride and Prejudice

== See also ==
- Fitzwilliam Sonatas, an arrangement of Handel's recorder sonatas
- Fitzwilliam Virginal Book, source of keyboard music in the Elizabethan and Jacobean periods in England
