= Thomas FitzWilliam, 1st Viscount FitzWilliam =

Irish nobleman

Thomas FitzWilliam, 1st Viscount Fitzwilliam (1581–1650) was an Irish nobleman of the Stuart period. He was born to wealth and privilege, and acquired a peerage, but due to his loyalty to the English Crown, he suffered considerable hardship during the English Civil War, and died in poverty.

== Background ==
He was born in Dublin, probably at Merrion Castle, eldest of the five sons of Sir Richard FitzWilliam, Constable of Wicklow, and Jane Preston, who was probably a close relative (but not the daughter) of Christopher Preston, 4th Viscount Gormanston. The FitzWilliam family are recorded in Dublin from about 1210, and by the time of Thomas's birth they were among the wealthiest and most influential families in the Pale.

== Early career ==
Thomas was only fourteen when his father died. As a young man he spent some time in London studying law at Gray's Inn. He was knighted in 1605, the year of his marriage.

In 1608 he narrowly avoided being caught up in the rebellion of Sir Cahir O'Doherty, having stood surety for the good behaviour of O'Doherty, who had married Thomas's cousin Mary Preston. A messenger arrived at Merrion Castle ordering FitzWilliam to produce the person of O'Doherty; fortunately, FitzWilliam was not at home.

He was knighted the same year, and served as Sheriff of County Dublin in 1609. In 1610 he received a substantial grant of land in County Armagh from the English Crown. No doubts about his loyalty to the Crown seem to have been entertained, except perhaps during the latter part of the English Civil War. In 1629 King Charles I created him Viscount FitzWilliam in recognition of his family's long record of service to the Crown. It appears that a good deal was expected in return for the title, and Thomas had to make substantial gifts of money to the King. This put a particular burden on his estates since he was involved in protracted litigation with his numerous brothers and sisters, due to his father's breaking of an entail on the estates, which benefitted Thomas at the expense of his siblings. Admittedly Thomas himself had been the beneficiary of a generous Crown grant of land in Armagh. Like nearly all of his family, he inclined to the Roman Catholic faith, while adhering in public to the Church of Ireland. Later generations of Fitzwilliams, including his son William, were quite open in their support for the Catholic religion.

== Civil war and last years ==
When the Irish Rebellion of 1641 broke out, FitzWilliam, unlike many of the nobility of the Pale, remained loyal to the Crown, despite strong pressure from his mother's family, the Prestons of Gormanston, and particularly the military commander Thomas Preston, 1st Viscount Tara, to join the Irish Confederacy. He was one of only three nobles to offer their assistance in the Royalist defence of Dublin, and a garrison was placed in Merrion Castle. It was betrayed in June 1642 and thereafter FitzWilliam only lived there for short periods. He offered his services to the Lords Justices, but despite his long record of loyalty to the Crown he was rebuffed, apparently on account of his known leanings towards the Roman Catholic religion, and he took no further part in the fighting. He spent some time in England, where the King received him courteously. He was promised an English Earldom, but the promise was not kept. He returned to Ireland, only to discover that he had been outlawed. In his last years he led an unsettled existence, sometimes living at Merrion Castle, sometimes with his eldest son at Howth, and sometimes in Louth. At times he seems to have been almost destitute, and he wrote to James Butler, 1st Duke of Ormonde in 1647 asking for repayment of a debt. In 1648 he was promised a pension of £100 a year, but it is unclear if he ever received it.

Due perhaps to the confused conditions of the English Civil War, little seems to be known about the date and place of his death. Even the year of his death has been disputed, but is generally stated to be 1650. He was certainly dead before 1655 when his eldest surviving son Oliver was allowed to inherit some of the estates, though most were not restored until 1663.

== Family ==
In 1605 he married Margaret Plunkett, daughter of Oliver Plunkett, 4th Baron Louth and his wife Frances, who was the daughter of Nicholas Bagenal and Eleanor Griffith, and sister of Henry Bagenal and of Mabel Bagenal, Countess of Tyrone. They had four sons:

- Richard, who predeceased his father: he married Elizabeth Stanihust but had no children;
- Oliver FitzWilliam, 1st Earl of Tyrconnell, he was married three times but had no children;
- Christopher, who lived mainly in England: he married Jane Brereton of Malpas (whose sister Dorothy was his brother Oliver's first wife) and had one surviving daughter but no son;
- William FitzWilliam, 3rd Viscount FitzWilliam, ancestor of all succeeding Viscounts Fitzwilliam. He married Mary Luttrell and had six children.

== Character ==
His friend James Butler, 1st Duke of Ormonde described him as a man who was "in every way faithful to his allegiance". This is especially interesting since Ormonde in later years was no friend to Fitzwilliam's son Oliver, who played a careful double game during the Cromwellian era and was accused of divided loyalties.

Peerage of Ireland
New creation	Viscount FitzWilliam; 1629–1650	Succeeded by Oliver FitzWilliam
