= Red Lion Brewery =

English brewery

The Red Lion Brewery was an English brewery located in East Smithfield, London. It was believed to have been established around the 15th century, and closed in 1934.

== Location ==
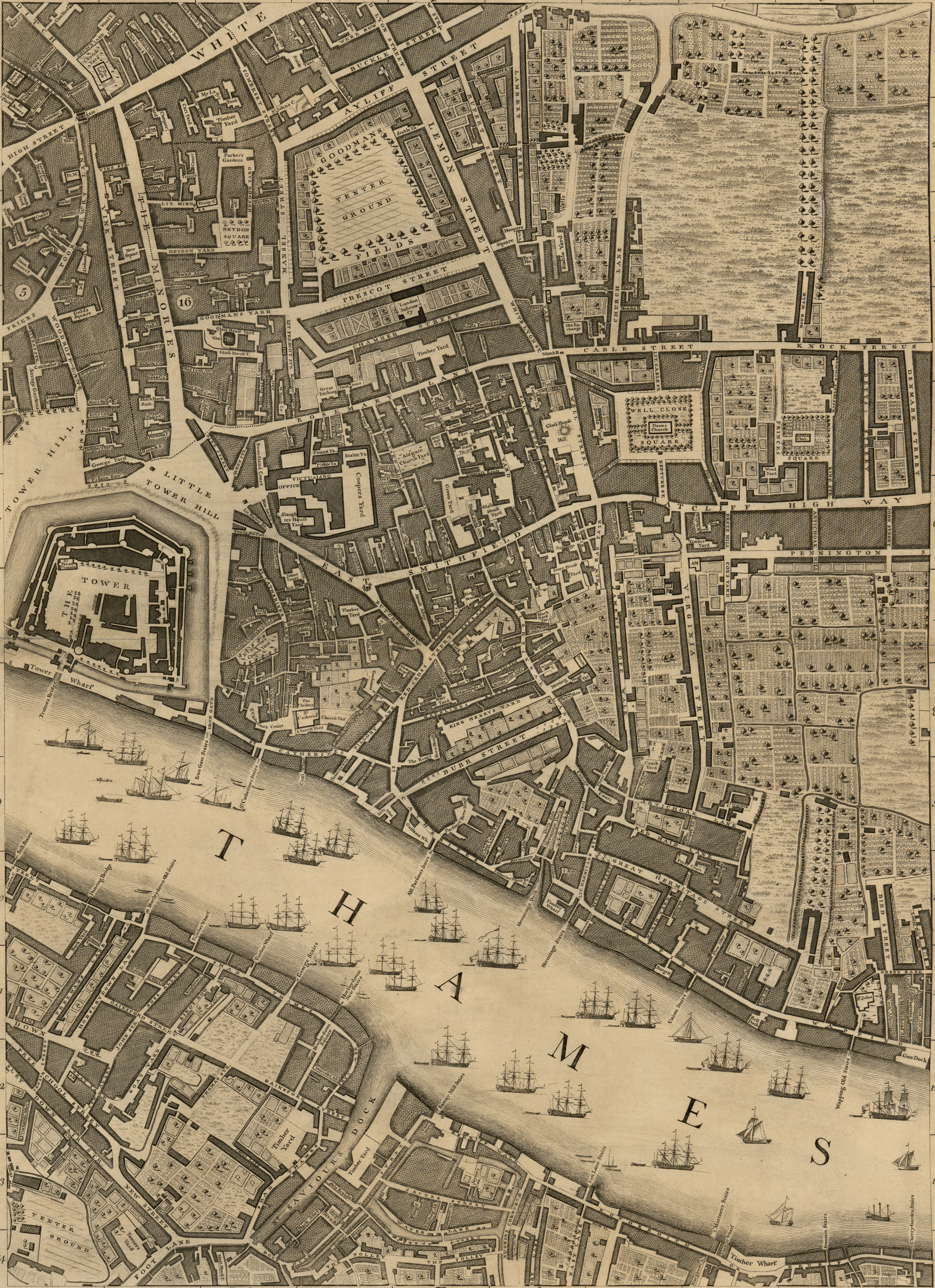
The brewery marked here on John Rocque's map of 1746 as "Parson's Brew House"

The brewery was located close to the north bank of the River Thames, on St Catharine's (today St Katharine's Way), and south of Burr Street (today Burr Close). The site survived 19th century dock developments, becoming situated between St Katharine Docks and the western (Hermitage) basin of the London Docks. Barnard (1890) described how "sturdy porters" carried sacks of malt from Hoare's wharf to the warehouses in the brewery buildings: "We counted forty of these men ... each one bringing his sack of malt (weighing about one-and-a-half hundredweight) from the barge and depositing the contents in the warehouse".

== Early history ==
It is not known exactly when the brewery was founded, but it is believed to date back to the 'beerhouses' referred to in John Stow's Survey of England (1597). It is understood to be the beerhouse referred to as 'the Lyon' in a license given to the brewer John Merchant in 1492, for the export of 'ale'.

Through the Elizabethan era the brewery appears to have been part owned by the Crown, as well as at various times, the Poine, Long, Harrison, and Deane families, before being gifted by Elizabeth I to her favourite Robert Dudley, 1st Earl of Leicester. After Dudley's death the brewery was eventually consolidated into the ownership of James Desmaistres.

== Parsons family ==
James Desmaistres employed a brewer named John Parsons, a member of the Worshipful Company of Brewers. Parsons rented the brewery from Desmaistres for 39 years for £44 per annum, leasing the Red Lion Brewery premises, but owning the Red Lion Brewery business. Desmaistres passed on his share in the brewery premises to the Hoste family via inheritance through a daughter.

Four generations of the Parsons family brewed at the Red Lion brewery. John's son, John Parsons Jr, leveraged his position to become commissioner of victualling for the Royal Navy. He also became master of the Worshipful Company of Brewers and later Lord Mayor of the City of London. He was knighted by James II.

John Parsons Jr's son, Humphrey Parsons, took over the brewing business in 1717. Humphrey Parsons obtained the patronage of Louis XV of France, whom he supplied with his Porter known as "Parsons' Black Champagne". The porter obtained fame all over London, and was mentioned in Oliver Goldsmith's poem, "Description Of An Author's Bedchamber". Humphrey became a Member of Parliament and twice Lord Mayor of the City of London.

== Hoare & Co. ==
The Goodwyne family became owners of the Red Lion Brewery business around 1779, having acquired it from the Parsons family. However, the Hoare family became co-owners of the business in 1802, as the junior partners. The Hoare family were bankers, and owners of C. Hoare & Co. At the time it was fashionable for banks to own breweries as a means of stabilising income (for example, Guinness beer, and Guinness Bank).

In 1825, the Hoare family were sole owners of the Red Lion Brewery business, and by 1833, the Hoare family co-owned the Red Lion Brewery premises with Frederick Woodbridge. At various times the brewery traded under the name Hoare & Co. and used the Toby Jug as their trademark. In 1924, Hoare & Co purchased a separate brewery, the Lion Brewery Co in Lambeth.

== Charrington & Co. Ltd ==
In 1933, Charrington & Co. purchased Hoare and Co.'s Red Lion Brewery and production ceased a year later in 1934.

There is essentially no surviving trace of the Red Lion Brewery building, as the site is now covered by the South Quay housing estate. It is believed the broad entrance arch on St Katherine's Way may mark the old entry site into the brewery, and a small narrow alleyway nearby is marked "Alderman Stairs" referring to Humphrey Parsons.
