= Richard FitzWilliam, 5th Viscount FitzWilliam =

Irish nobleman and politician

Arms of FitzWilliam: Lozengy, argent and gules

Richard FitzWilliam, 5th Viscount FitzWilliam, PC (Ireland) (c. 1677 – 6 June 1743), of Mount Merrion in Dublin, was an Irish nobleman and Whig politician.

== Origins ==
He was the only son of Thomas FitzWilliam, 4th Viscount FitzWilliam by his first wife Mary Stapleton, a daughter of the English statesman Sir Philip Stapleton and his first wife Frances Hotham. The FitzWilliam family is recorded in Ireland from about 1210, and by the seventeenth century had become one of the largest landowners in Dublin.

== Career ==
He succeeded to the Viscountcy of FitzWilliam in 1704, and became a member of the Irish Privy Council in 1715. He was elected a member of parliament for Fowey in 1727, a seat he held until 1734. His father and grandfather had been Roman Catholics, and his father had been under attainder for a time for his loyalty to the Catholic King James II; but Richard conformed to the Church of Ireland.

== Properties ==
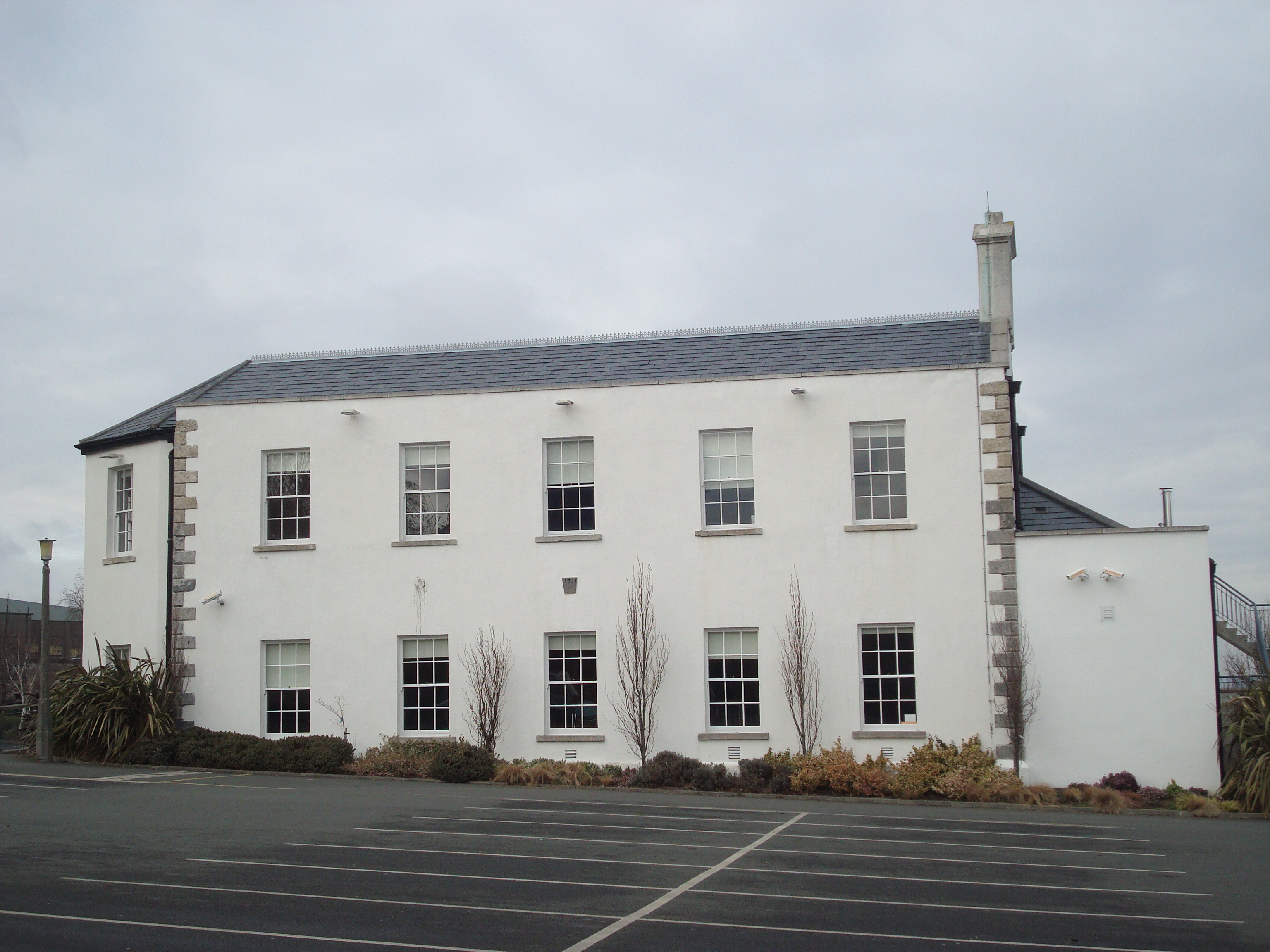
Remnant of Mount Merrion House

In 1711, he built Mount Merrion House in Dublin. The older family home of Merrion Castle was, rather surprisingly, allowed to fall into decay: it was a ruin by 1730, and was pulled down later in the century. Richard spent his later years in England, but his heirs returned to Mount Merrion. He let the house to John Wainwright, one of the Barons of the Court of Exchequer (Ireland).

== Marriage and children ==
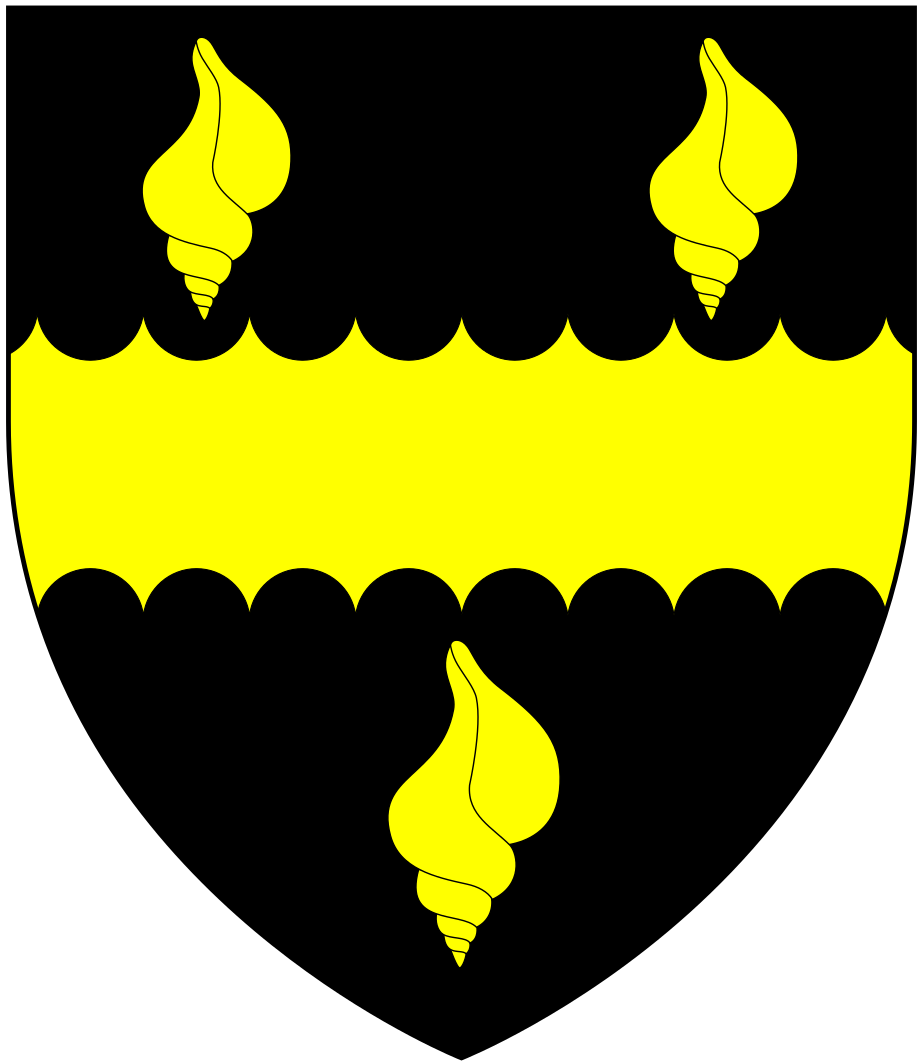
Arms of Shelley (of Michelgrove): Sable, a fesse engrailed between three whelks

Lord Fitzwilliam married Frances Shelley, daughter of Sir John Shelley, 3rd Baronet of Michaelgrove and his first wife Bridget Neville, daughter of George Nevill, 11th Baron Bergavenny. They had five children:

- Richard FitzWilliam, 6th Viscount FitzWilliam
- William FitzWilliam, Usher of the Black Rod in Ireland
- John FitzWilliam, a soldier;
- Mary FitzWilliam, who married firstly Henry Herbert, 9th Earl of Pembroke; through this marriage in the following century, the great FitzWilliam inheritance passed into the Herbert family, who are today still substantial landowners in Dublin city. She married secondly Major North Ludlow Bernard, of Castle Bernard, Bandon, County Cork, who was the grandfather through his first wife of the first Earl of Bandon.
- Frances FitzWilliam, who married George Evans, 2nd Baron Carbery.

Parliament of Great Britain
| Preceded by Nicholas Vincent; William Bromley | Member of Parliament for Fowey; 1727–1734; With: William Bromley 1727; Jonathan Rashleigh 1727–1734 | Succeeded by Jonathan Rashleigh; William Hedges |
Peerage of Ireland
| Preceded by Thomas Fitzwilliam | Viscount FitzWilliam; 1704–1743 | Succeeded by Richard FitzWilliam |
