= John Parsons (died 1717) =

English Member of Parliament (1639–1717)

Lord Mayor of London
- In office 1703–1704
- Preceded by: Sir Samuel Dashwood
- Succeeded by: Sir Owen Buckingham

Personal details
- Born: 1639
- Died: 25 January 1717 (aged 77–78)
- Spouse(s): Elizabeth Beane; Jane Milward
- Children: Humphrey; Henry; Anne
- Parents: John Parsons (father); Jane Parsons (mother)

Sir John Parsons (1639 – 25 January 1717) of The Priory, Reigate, Surrey, was an English brewer, Royal Navy victualler and Tory politician, who sat in the English and British House of Commons between 1685 and 1717. He was Lord Mayor of London in 1703.

== Origins ==
John Parsons was born in 1639 and baptised on 28 August at St Botolph without Aldgate, London. He was the son of John Parsons, a brewer, of East Smithfield, London and his wife, Jane. He married, by 1667, Elizabeth Beane, daughter of Humphrey Beane, a cordwainer of Epsom, Surrey. She was born in 1645 (baptised on 18 December 1645 in St Olave, Southwark). Elizabeth died before 1677, when Parsons married as his second wife, Jane Milward, on 7 February.

== Commercial career ==
Parsons was the owner of the Red Lion Brewery in East Smithfield, a business he inherited from his father. This brewing business in London was popular for its strong stout, known as "Parson's Black Champagne". The brewery exported beer as well as supplying it locally and had the principal export trade in beer to France. Parsons was a joint farmer of excise for Cumberland, county Durham, Northumberland and Westmorland from 1671 to 1674. He was appointed victualler to the navy in 1677 and advanced to Commissioner for victualling the navy in 1683, holding the post until 1689.

In early 1695, Sir John Parsons was listed as a trustee for a scheme to launch "the Royal Academies" using lotteries for admission. Parsons and the other trustees (gentlemen and merchants) were acting as fiduciaries rather than "underwriters" of the project. The project was not successfully launched.

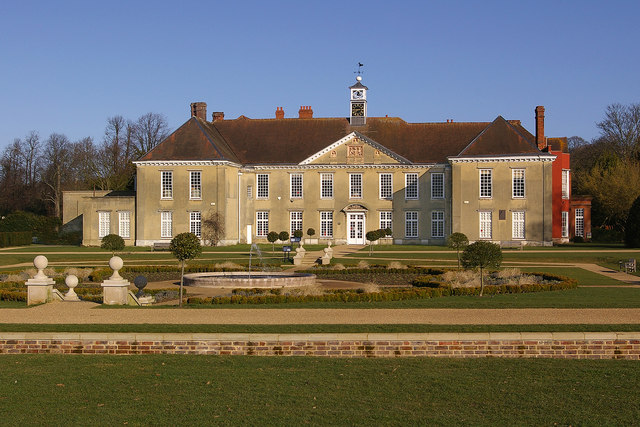
Reigate Priory today

== Reigate Place ==
Parsons purchased the Priory estate in Reigate in 1681 as a home for his large family. He commissioned an impressive staircase with fine parquetry for the house. In 1700, a gallery was erected in the south aisle of St Mary's church, Reigate, especially for Sir John Parsons of Reigate Priory to house his wife, children and very large family. This remained for 150 years and was used by subsequent owners of the Priory until it was removed in about 1845.

== Political career ==
Parsons was returned as Tory Member of Parliament for Reigate at the 1685 English general election. He was an Alderman of London for Castle Baynard ward in 1687. He was knighted by James II on 15 August 1687 at Windsor Castle and served as Sheriff of London for the year 1687 to 1688. From 1687 to 1688, he was Alderman for Portsoken ward and from 1688 for Bassetshaw. He was admitted to the Brewers Company on 16 October 1688 and was Master of the Brewers Company in 1689. He was elected to the Convention Parliament of 1689 but was unseated on petition on 1 March 1689. At the 1690 English general election, he was returned as MP for Reigate and again at the 1695 English general election. He was defeated at the 1698 English general election but was returned unopposed at the first general election of 1701. At the second general election of 1701 he stood at Reigate and the City of London, and although he received hardly any votes at London, was returned again as MP for Reigate. He was re-elected for Reigate at the 1702 English general election. He translated to the Fishmongers Company on 19 October 1703, and served as Lord Mayor of London for the year 1703 to 1704. He was notable for giving up his official fees for the payment of the City debts.

Parsons stood again for Reigate and the City of London at the 1705 English general election, but was only returned for Reigate where he was unopposed. He was Prime Warden Fishmongers Company from 1706 to 1708. At the 1708 British general election, he was again returned for Reigate. He was returned again at the 1710 British general election. From 1710 to 1714, he was Colonel of the Red regiment in the City militia. He was returned again in 1713 and 1715.

== Death and legacy ==
Parsons died on 25 January 1717 and was buried in Aldgate. His sons Humphrey by his first wife and Henry by his second wife were both MPs. His son, Humphrey, inherited Reigate Priory, and held the estate until 1741. His daughter Anne (by his second wife) married the barrister John Wainwright, who became a much-loved judge in Ireland, where he died of Famine fever while on assize in 1741.

Parliament of England
Preceded by Ralph Freeman; Deane Goodwin	Member of Parliament for Reigate; 1685–1689; With: Sir John Werden 1685-1689; Roger James 1689	Succeeded by Roger James; Thomas Vincent
Preceded by Roger James; Thomas Vincent	Member of Parliament for Reigate; 1690–1698; With: John Parsons	Succeeded by Stephen Hervey; Edward Thurland
Preceded by Stephen Hervey; Edward Thurland	Member of Parliament for Reigate; 1701–1707; With: Stephen Hervey	Succeeded by Parliament of Great Britain
Parliament of Great Britain
Preceded by Parliament of England	Member of Parliament for Reigate; 1707–1717; With: James Cocks 1707-1710, 1713-1717; John Ward 1710-1713	Succeeded by James Cocks; William Jordan
Civic offices
Preceded by Sir Samuel Dashwood	Lord Mayor of London; 1703–1704	Succeeded by Sir Owen Buckingham
