= Philip Stapleton =

English Member of Parliament

Sir Philip Stapleton of Wighill and of Warter-on-the-Wolds, Yorkshire (1603 – 18 August 1647) was an English Member of Parliament, a supporter of the Parliamentary cause during the English Civil War, and a colonel in the Parliamentary Army until 1645. His surname is also sometimes spelt Stapylton or Stapilton.

== Life ==
Born in 1603 at Warter-on-the-Wolds, Yorkshire, he was the second son of Sir Henry Stapleton of Wighill (Wighill, Yorkshire, 1572 – St. Andrews, 16 February 1630/1631) and wife Mary Forster (Bamborough Castle, Northumberland, 30 March 1569 – St. Andrew Holborn Parish, London, Middlesex, 6 November 1656). He was admitted as a fellow commoner of Queens' College, Cambridge in 1617. On 25 May 1630, he was knighted by King Charles I.

He served as MP for Hedon in the Short Parliament (April 1640) and Boroughbridge in the Long Parliament (Nov 1640). In 1642, he was appointed parliamentary commissioner in Yorkshire. When the civil war broke out he was made a colonel of horse and commander of the Earl of Essex's bodyguard. He commanded a brigade of cavalry at the Battle of Edgehill, including Cromwell's troop, one of two held in reserve until late in the day and whose charge against the flanks and rear of the Royal infantry almost secured a parliamentary victory but proved ultimately inconclusive. He also saw action at the Battle of Chalgrove Field and at the First Battle of Newbury. He was a member of the Committee of Safety appointed in 1642 and of the Committee of Both Kingdoms which replaced it in 1643.

However, he fell out of favour when he opposed the Self-Denying Ordinance and the advancement of Oliver Cromwell. In 1647, he was one of the eleven members of Parliament impeached by the army, but managed to escape to Calais, and died at a local Inn there later the same year of fever, perhaps plague, and was buried in August 1647 at the Protestant Burial Ground at Calais.

== Family ==
Stapleton married twice, first in 1627 to Frances Hotham (1605–1636), daughter of Sir John Hotham, 1st Baronet, and wife Katherine Rodes, widow of John Gee, Esq., of Beverley (1606–1627), with issue, by whom he had two sons:

- John Stapleton of Warter and of Wighill (Warter, York, East Riding of Yorkshire, 1628 – 1697, married Elizabeth Mary Lawson (Isel, Cumberland, 1635 – Yorkshire, 1743), daughter of Sir Wilfrid Lawson, 1st Baronet, of Isell, and wife Jane Musgrave, and had issue:
  - Isabella Stapleton, wife of Sir William Pennington, 1st Baronet of Muncaster, and had issue
  - Jane - died young
  - Frances - b. 1655
  - Elizabeth - b. 1656
  - Jane - m. Rowland Mosley of York
  - Esther - b. 1659; m. John Saunders
  - Wilfred - b. 1663; died young
- Robert Stapleton of Wighill (1635–1675), married Dorothy, daughter of Henry Fairfax, 4th Lord Fairfax of Cameron, in 1674, but the marriage had no issue, likely due to his death the next year..
- Isabelle (1632 - 1644) unmarried and without issue
- Katherine Stapleton (Wighill, Yorkshire, 1635 – ?), married George Leson of Dublin in 1649
- Mary Stapleton (York, Yorkshire, 1636 – London, Middlesex, 1704), who married Thomas FitzWilliam, 4th Viscount FitzWilliam (Ireland, ca. 1640 – Ireland, 24 February 1704), who was a rather surprising choice of husband for a child of Sir Philip, as Thomas was an Irish Roman Catholic and a staunch Royalist; there was no issue of the marriage.

His second wife was Barbara Lennard (Hurstmonceaux, Sussex, 1 April 1604 – ca. 1665), daughter of Henry Lennard, 12th Baron Dacre, and wife Chrysogona Baker. Their children were:

- Henry Stapleton of Wighill (Warter, Yorkshire, 1639 – 1723), unmarried and without issue
- Elizabeth Stapleton (11 February 1640 – ?), unmarried and without issue
- Isabell Stapleton (York, Yorkshire, 1642 – 16 December 1646)unmarried and without issue; possibly identical with Elizabeth
- Frances Stapleton (Westminster, 1641 – 1719), married Sir Nathaniel Powell of Ewhurst Place, Sussex
- Philipa Stapleton (London, 1644 – 16 December 1646, bur. London, Middlesex)
- Philip Stapleton of Fulham and Wighill (City of Westminster, London, Middlesex, 1645 – 9 November 1729), married Margaret Gage ( – ca. 1743), daughter of Thomas Gage, his father's coachman and faithful servant, who attended him at his death at Calais. Had issue, baptised at Fulham:
  - Henry - baptized 19th Jan., 1684; buried 5 September 1685
  - Frances - 22nd Dec, 1686.
  - Philippa - 13th Dec, 1688.
  - Dorothy - 25th December 1689 at St Martin-in-the-Fields; buried at Fulham 8 May 1692
  - Robert - 5th March, 1690/1; buried 5 November 1694
  - Henry - 6th April, 1692; died 1725.
  - Mary - 22nd Nov., 1696.
  - Philip - 3rd April, 1698; died 1744.
    - (American rapper Eminem is descended from this branch.)

== Sources ==
- The Concise Dictionary of National Biography: From Earliest Times to 1985, Oxford University Press; ISBN 978-0198653059
- Stapleton genealogy
- Leigh Rayment's Peerage Pages
