= Baggotrath Castle =

Former castle near Baggot Street, Dublin, Ireland

Coordinates: 53°20′01″N 6°14′35″W

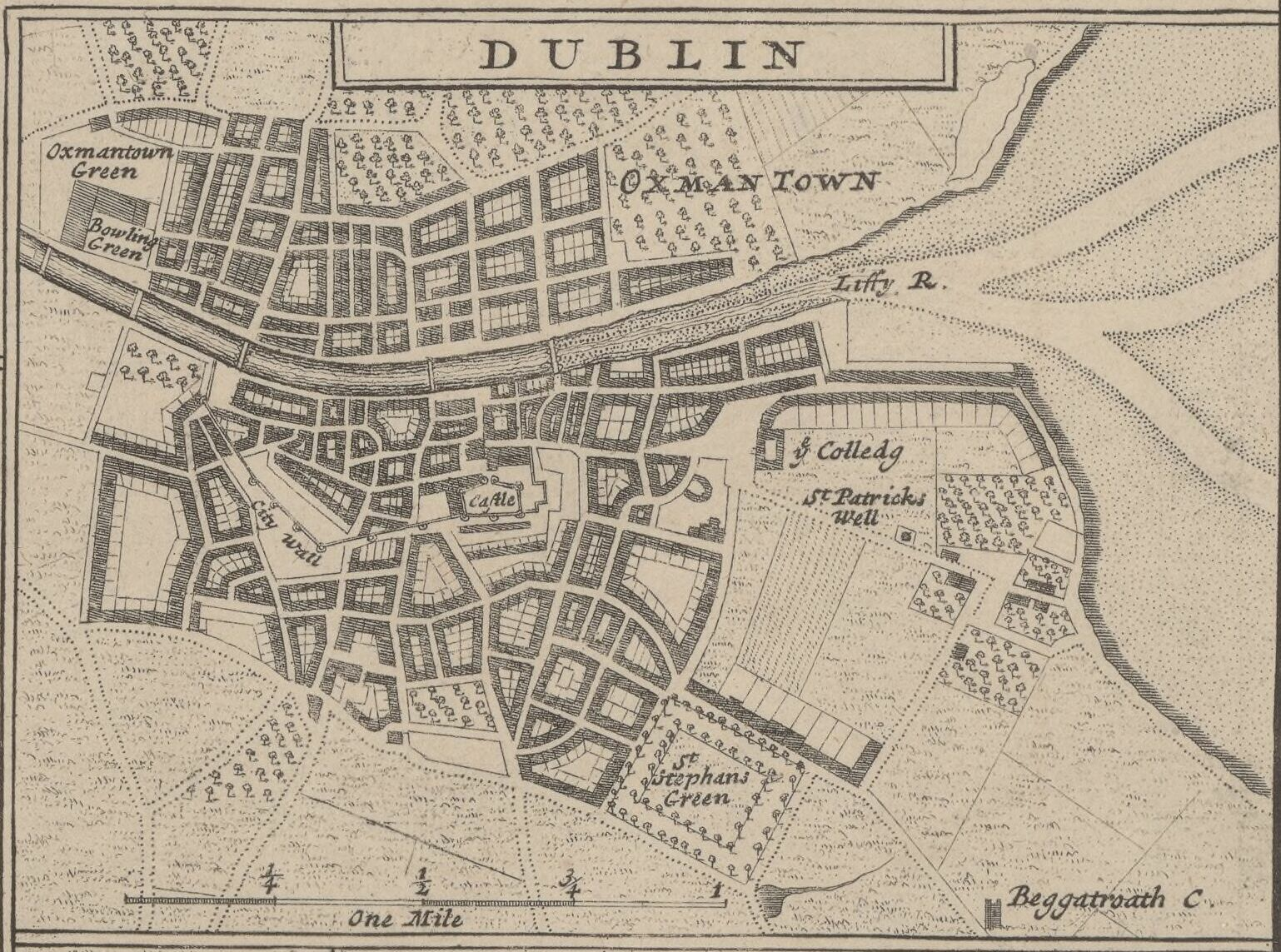
"Beggatroath Castle" on Herman Moll's map of Dublin c. 1714, in the red circle.

Baggotrath Castle, or Baggotsrath Castle, was a castle situated at present-day Baggot Street in Dublin city centre. It was built in the late thirteenth century by the Bagod (later called Baggot) family, for whom it was named. For much of its history, it was owned by the Fitzwilliam family.

During the English Civil War, possession of the castle, which was described as "the strongest fortress near Dublin", was a matter of great importance to both sides in the conflict, and it was largely destroyed during the siege of Dublin in 1649, on the eve of the Battle of Rathmines. The ruins of the castle remained on the site until the early nineteenth century when Dublin Corporation demolished what was left of it. No trace of it survives today, but it probably stood at present-day 44-46 Upper Baggot Street, facing Waterloo Road.

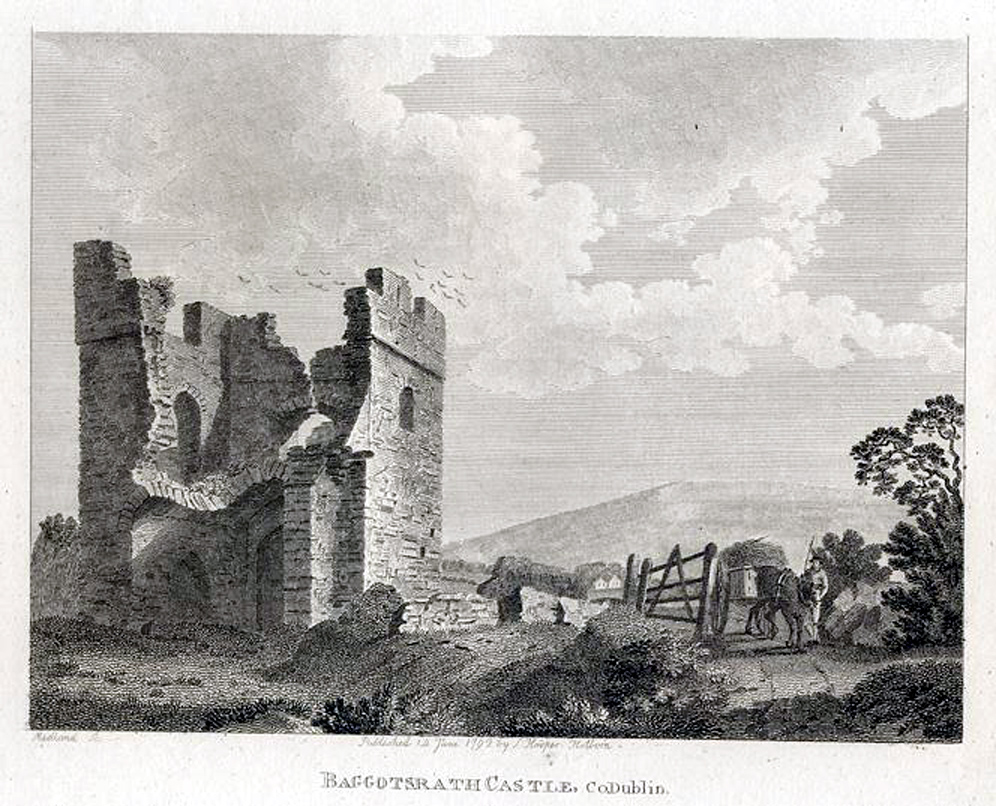
The ruins of Baggotsrath Castle in a 1791 sketch by Francis Grose

== Early history ==
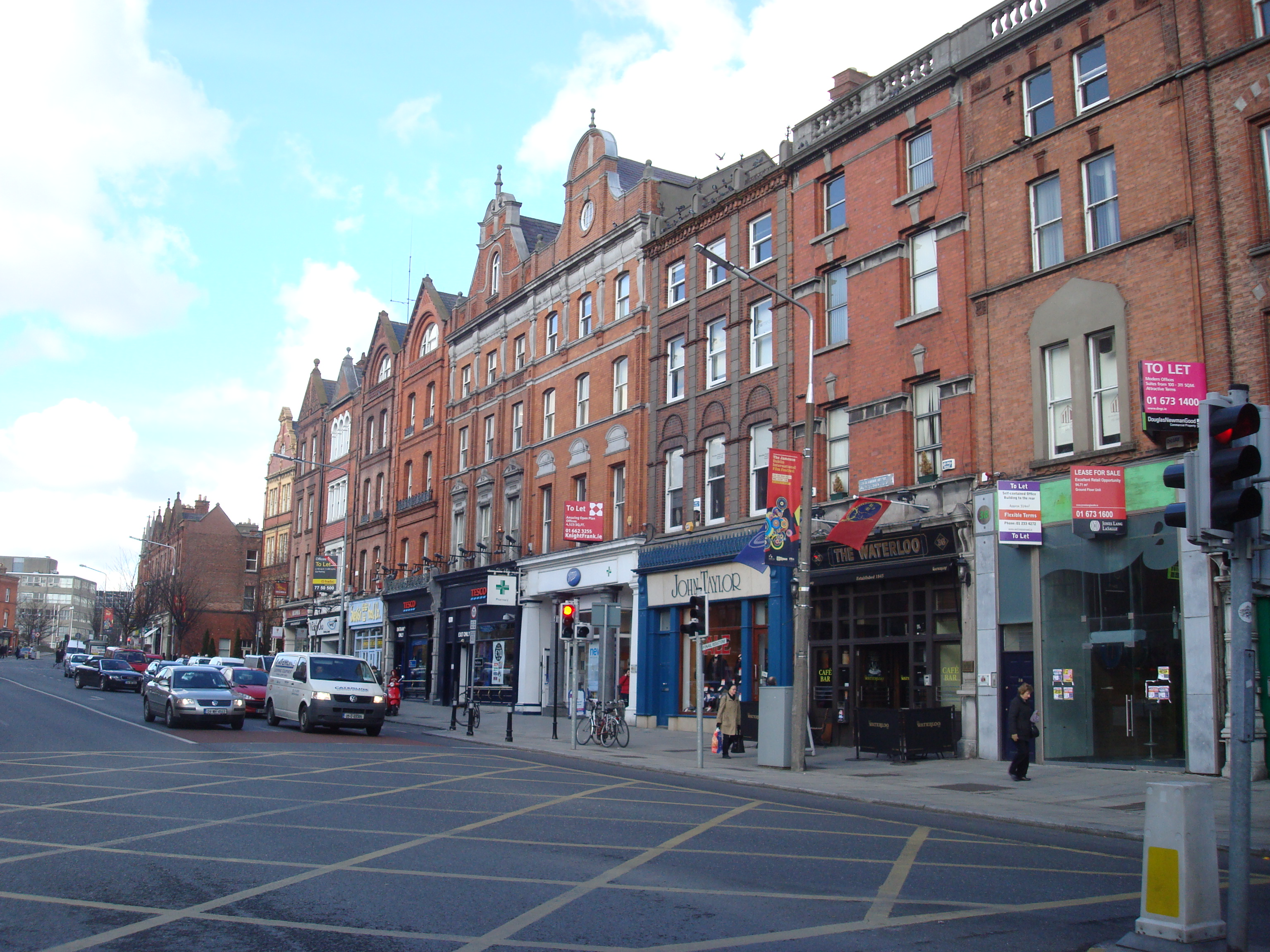
The approximate position of Baggotrath castle today on the right of this photo at number 38-46 Upper Baggot Street

The castle and the surrounding district took their name from the Bagod family, which was founded by Sir Robert Bagod, the Chief Justice of the Irish Common Pleas, who purchased the lands from Nicholas de Hyntenberge about 1280 and built the castle. From the Bagods, ownership of the castle passed to the Fitzwilliam family, who later held the title Viscount Fitzwilliam. It came into the possession of the influential English-born soldier and statesman Sir Edward Perrers in the early 15th century, but later reverted to the Fitzwilliam family.

The castle was the scene of violent conflict in 1441. Sir Edward Perrers' widow Joanna, to whom the castle had passed on their only son's death in 1428, died having appointed James Cornwalsh, the Chief Baron of the Irish Exchequer, as her executor. Cornwalsh took possession of the castle, a move which was greatly resented by Sir Edward Perrers' daughter Ismaye, who had married into the wealthy and acquisitive Fitzwilliam family of Dundrum. Her husband raised a substantial troop of soldiers, attacked the castle, and according to the charges laid against him, he "feloniously murdered" the judge, who was sitting peacefully at supper, quite unaware of the dangers. The charge of murder makes it difficult to explain why Fitzwilliam and Ismaye were soon pardoned, although the Government of Henry VI was notoriously willing to issue pardons, even for the most serious of crimes.

The castle was described as being in a ruinous condition in 1489 but it was later rebuilt, and by the 1640s was said to be the strongest fortress near Dublin, although the owners complained of substantial damage to their property in 1642.

== Battle of Rathmines ==
In July 1649 the Irish Royalist leader, James Butler, 1st Duke of Ormonde advanced on Dublin, which was held by Parliamentary forces under Colonel Michael Jones. Anticipating that Ormonde would try to seize Baggotrath Castle, Jones took the precaution of partly destroying it. Nonetheless, Ormonde was determined that the castle should be fortified if possible. On 1 August a troop of 1,500 men was sent to secure it but, for reasons which have never been clear, they took the whole night to travel a distance of about a mile. When Ormonde himself arrived he found that nothing had been done to fortify the castle. Meanwhile, Jones had been alerted to Ormonde's arrival and attacked the castle with some 5,000 men. The Royalist cavalry deserted and most of the foot soldiers were killed or captured, allowing Jones to move on to his decisive victory at Rathmines.

== Decay and ruin ==
No effort seems to have been made by the Fitzwilliams (who owned another substantial Dublin property, Merrion Castle) to restore Baggotrath, and the process of decay continued inexorably. Its ruins were described in detail by Austin Cooper in 1778, and drawn by Francis Grose in 1791, some years before what remained of the castle was demolished by the corporation to allow for the extension of Baggot Street. The name is preserved in Baggotrath Lane, a narrow side street which connects Lower Baggot Street with Merrion Street.
