= Oliver FitzWilliam, 1st Earl of Tyrconnell =

Irish nobleman

Oliver FitzWilliam, 1st Earl of Tyrconnell and 2nd Viscount FitzWilliam (died 11 April 1667), was an Irish nobleman.

His father was The 1st Viscount FitzWilliam (1581–1650). His mother was Margaret Plunkett, daughter of Oliver, 4th Baron Louth; through his grandmother, he was a member of the powerful Bagenal family. As a younger son he did not expect to inherit the title or estates; like many young men in his position he read law, studied at Gray's Inn, and then resolved on a military career. With the help of The 1st Duke of Ormond, he became a Colonel in the French Army and showed both courage and military skill. On the death of his eldest brother Richard, he became heir to the title.

== Civil War ==
He was both a Catholic and a royalist, and enjoyed the confidence of Queen Henrietta Maria, who recommended him to Charles I as "a man deserving of every encouragement." In 1645 he tried to get the Confederation of Kilkenny to support King Charles I in the English Civil War on the grounds that their demands for full civic rights to be restored to Roman Catholics would be met. He fought with the Confederates against the Parliamentarians in 1645–6, and led a successful assault on Roscommon Castle in 1646. He saw service under his cousin Thomas Preston, 1st Viscount Tara, whose mother Catherine was a FitzWilliam. In 1649 he was imprisoned in London but soon released. He succeeded as The 2nd Viscount FitzWilliam in 1650 (although there is some doubt about his father's date of death).

After some time in France, Lord FitzWilliam was allowed to return to England through the pleas of his brother-in-law, The 2nd Earl of Clare. He is said to have been one of the few Irishmen whom Oliver Cromwell admired, and was also on good terms with Oliver's son Henry Cromwell, although Henry refused his request to be allowed to recover his principal residence, Merrion Castle. During the Commonwealth he seems to have played a careful double game - his second marriage into the Holles family put him firmly in the Parliamentarian camp, and enabled him to hold on to much of his property, apart from Merrion Castle itself, but he was also suspected of working for the Restoration of Charles II. On the other hand, his relationship with Oliver Cromwell was sufficiently close that he offered to arrange a reconciliation between Oliver and the regicide Edmund Ludlow, after the two men had quarrelled irrevocably when Cromwell assumed the title Lord Protector, leading to Ludlow's arrest. Because of his divided loyalties, Oliver seems to have lost the goodwill of the staunchly Royalist Ormonde, to whom as a rule any friend was a friend for life.

== Restoration ==
At the Restoration, Lord FitzWilliam was in high favour at Court, and was created Earl of Tyrconnell in 1661. His favour at Court did not, however, translate into a leading place in Irish public life. Whether for personal reasons (he is said to have been very unpopular) or because his friendly relations with Henry Cromwell had made him powerful enemies at home, he had great difficulty recovering the Merrion estates, and despite a personal plea on his behalf by the King, it was not until 1663 that he recovered all his properties. He suffered the serious legal setback (and personal humiliation) of being declared "not innocent" within the meaning of the Act of Settlement 1662 (which provided for the return of the confiscated lands of "innocent Catholics") by the Irish Parliament. Eventually, the Privy Council of Ireland, at the King's request, granted him a full pardon for any crimes he had committed during the Cromwellian era. Lord Tyrconnell devoted his last years to renovating Merrion Castle.

He died at Merrion Castle on 11 April 1667, and was buried on 12 April 1667 in the Fitzwilliam Chapel in Donnybrook church. His widow, Eleanor, returned to England, and died there in 1681.

== Family ==
He married firstly Dorothy Brereton of Malpas, a cousin of Sir William Brereton, 1st Baronet (her sister Jane married Oliver's brother Christopher), secondly a Miss Penruddock, and thirdly Lady Eleanore Holles, daughter of The 1st Earl of Clare and his wife, Anne Stanhope.

He had no issue by any of his marriages. On his death the Earldom of Tyrconnell became extinct, and the viscountcy passed to his brother William.

Peerage of Ireland
New creation	Earl of Tyrconnell; 1661–1667	Extinct
Preceded by Thomas FitzWilliam	Viscount FitzWilliam; 1650–1667	Succeeded by William FitzWilliam
