= Richard FitzWilliam, 7th Viscount FitzWilliam =

Anglo-Irish nobleman (1745–1816)

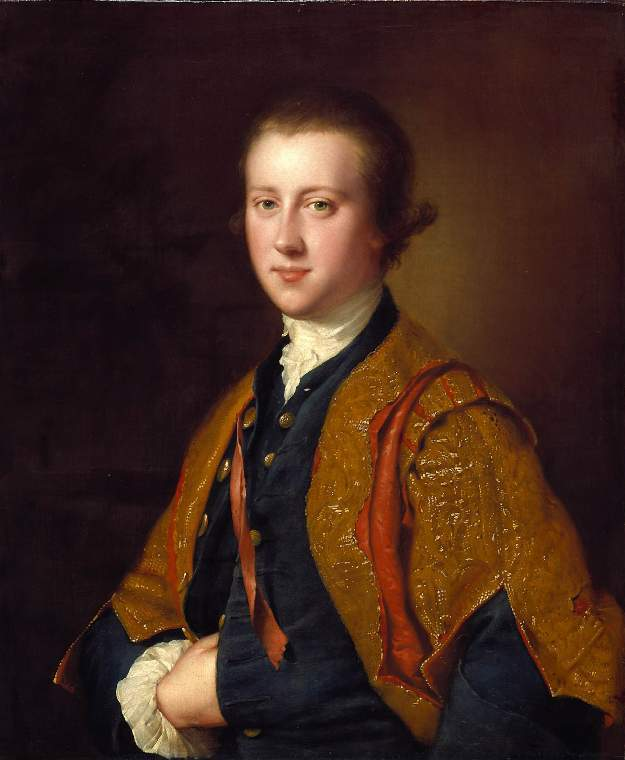
Richard FitzWilliam, 7th Viscount FitzWilliam, 1764 portrait by Joseph Wright of Derby; Fitzwilliam Museum

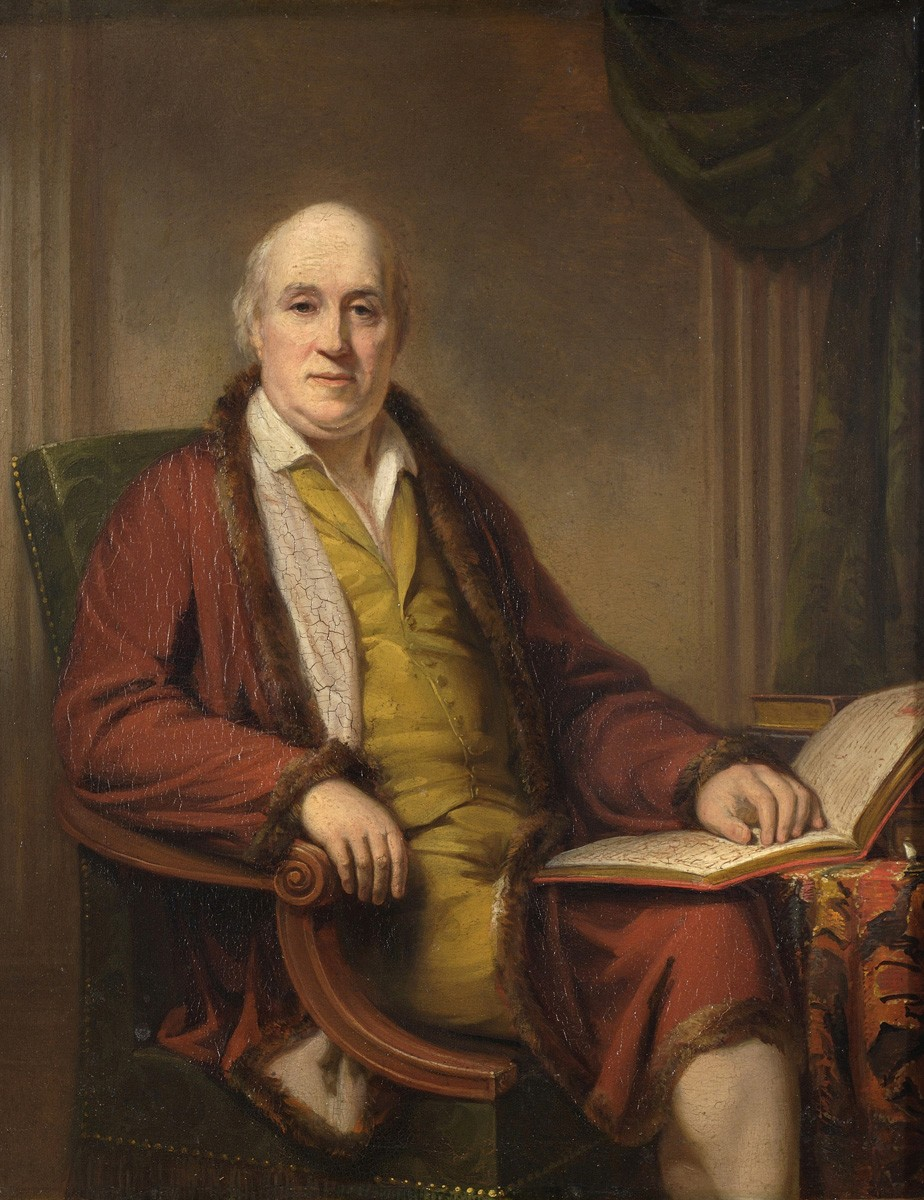
Richard FitzWilliam, 7th Viscount FitzWilliam. Portrait after Henry Howard, Fitzwilliam Museum

Arms of Fitwilliam: Lozengy argent and gules

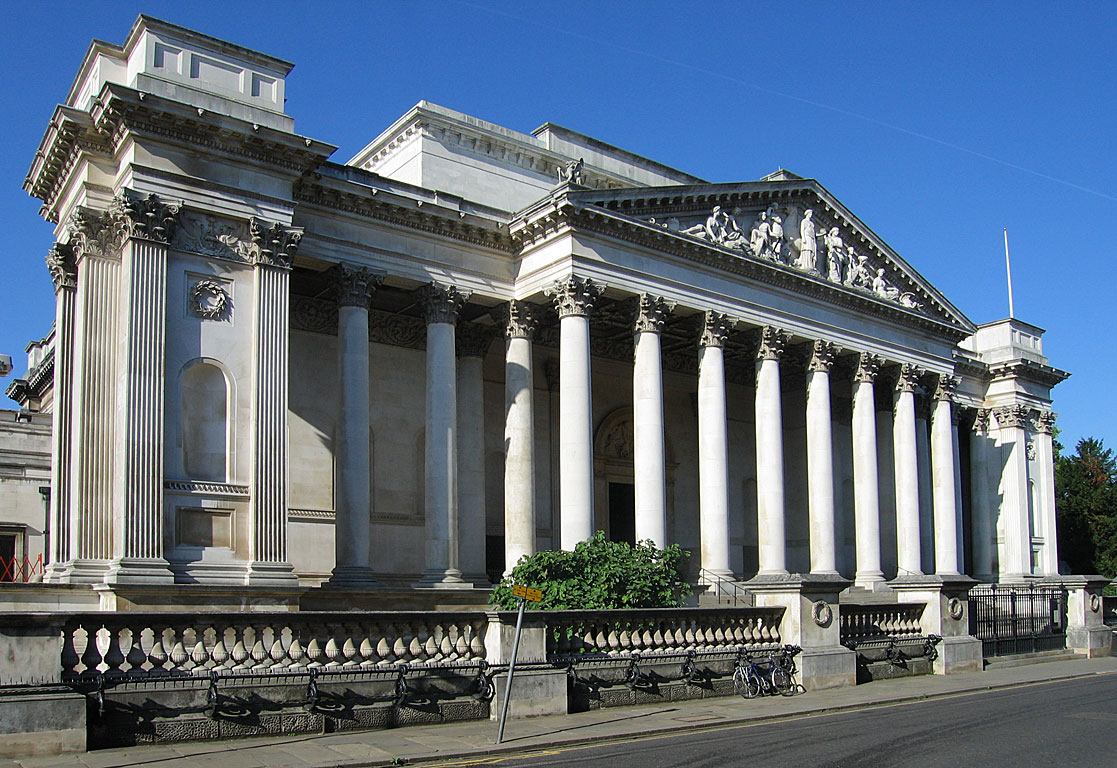
The Fitzwilliam Museum in Cambridge, founded by a bequest in the will of Richard FitzWilliam

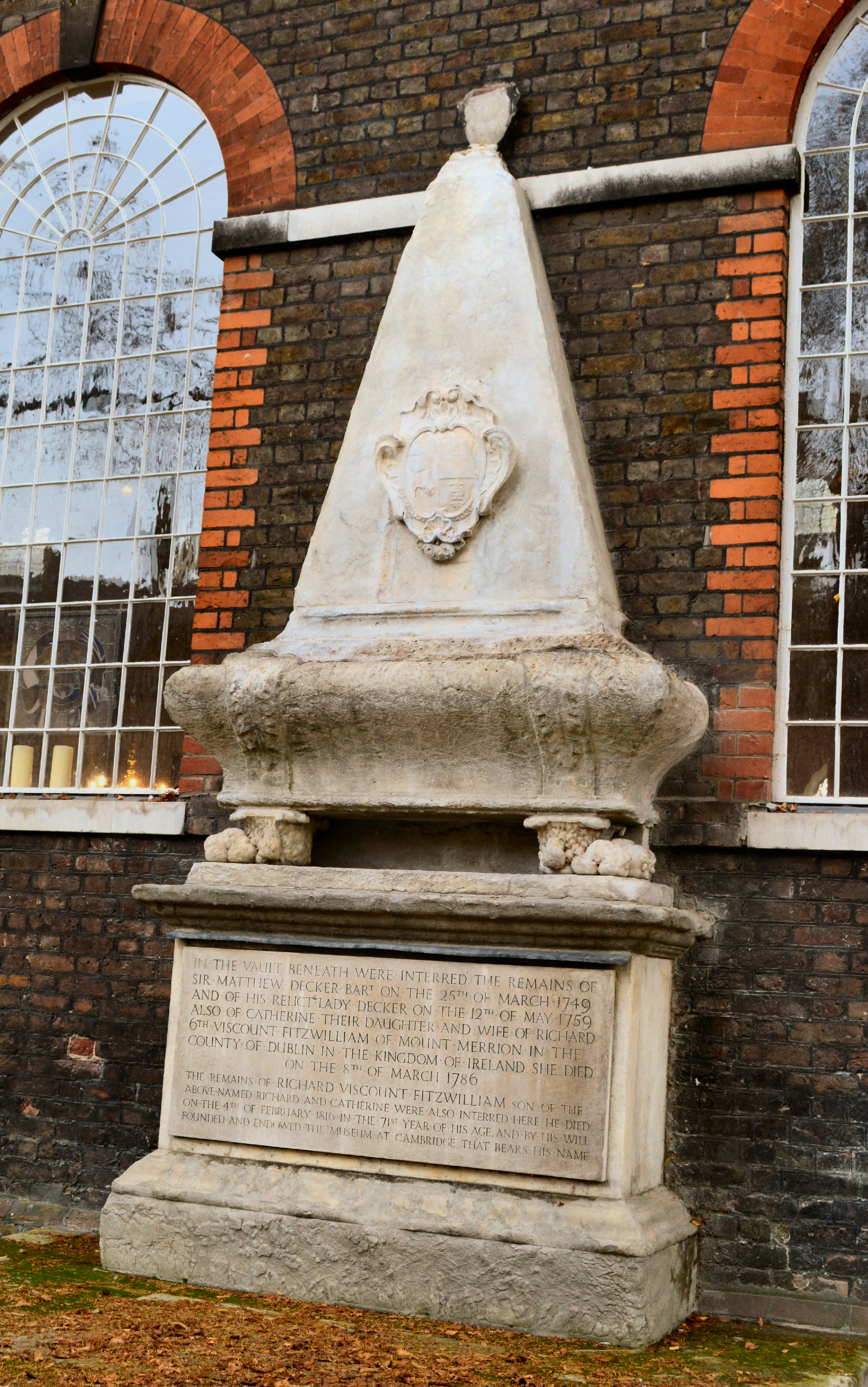
Monument to FitzWilliam and his maternal grandfather Sir Matthew Decker, 1st Baronet; St Mary Magdalene's Church, Richmond, Surrey

Richard FitzWilliam, 7th Viscount FitzWilliam (1 August 1745 – 4 February 1816) of Mount Merrion, Dublin, Ireland, and of FitzWilliam House in the parish of Richmond in Surrey, England, was an Anglo-Irish nobleman in the Peerage of Ireland who was a benefactor and musical antiquarian who founded the Fitzwilliam Museum in Cambridge, England, with a bequest of his library and art collection. He was also a significant urban developer in the City of Dublin. He served as a Member of Parliament for Wilton in Wiltshire, England (not precluded by his Irish peerage), from 1790 until his death.

== Origins ==
Richard FitzWilliam was baptised on 22 August 1745. He was the eldest son and heir of Richard FitzWilliam, 6th Viscount FitzWilliam (1711–1776) by his wife Catherine Decker, a daughter and co-heiress of Sir Matthew Decker, 1st Baronet (1679–1749) of Richmond, Surrey, England, a wealthy Dutch-born merchant, by his wife Henrietta Watkins.

=== Early origins ===
The Fitzwilliam family in Ireland appears to have been un-related to the prominent English Fitzwilliam family, Earls Fitzwilliam, but is, however, said in some sources to have split off from the English FitzWilliams during the reign of King Henry II (1154–1189) when a member of that family accompanied the king's son Prince John to Ireland, following his appointment as Chief Governor of Ireland. The coats of arms of the two families, adopted at the start of the age of heraldry c. 1200–1215, are, however, apparently identical: Lozengy argent and gules.

The family in Ireland are recorded in Dublin since the thirteenth century, and through shrewd business sense, and a series of advantageous marriages, they became the largest landowners in the region.

== Career ==
He was educated at Trinity Hall, Cambridge in England, and received an MA in 1764. He succeeded to his father's title in 1776 and was made a Fellow of the Royal Society in 1789. He was elected as the second Member of Parliament for Wilton in Wiltshire from 1790 to 1806.

== Residences ==
Although he made frequent visits to Mount Merrion House, south of Dublin, Richard FitzWilliam lived mainly at FitzWilliam House in the parish of Richmond, Surrey, to the west of London, where he formed his large art collection. He bequeathed it to his heir George Herbert, 11th Earl of Pembroke, who renamed it "Pembroke House" and the site is now represented by "Pembroke Villas" five pairs of large semi-detached Victorian villas on the northeastern side of Richmond Green. FitzWilliam had inherited the estate from his mother Catherine Decker. John Macky in his Journey through England (1722 to 1723), described the Decker estate at Richmond as follows:

The longest, largest, and highest Hedge of Holly I ever saw, is in this garden, with several other Hedges of Ever-Greens, Visto's cut through Woods, Grotto's with Fountains, a fine Canal running up from the River. His Duckery, which is an oval Pond brick'd round, and his pretty Summer-House by it to drink a Bottle, his Stove-Houses, which are always kept in an equal heat for his Citrons, and other Indian Plants, with Gardeners brought from foreign Countries to manage them, are very curious and entertaining. The house is also very large a-la-modern, and neatly furnished after the Dutch way.

Richard Bradley in his General treatise of husbandry and gardening for the month of July (1723) described the estate as follows:

Tis not long since I was Eye-witness to several fruited Pine Apples at Sir Matthew Decker's, at Richmond, about Forty in number; some ripening, and others in a promising condition; the least of which Fruit was above four Inches long, and some were as large as any I have seen brought from the West-Indies: I measured one near seven inches long in pure fruit, and near thirteen Inches about... I proceed to give an Account of the method now practis'd at Sir Matthew Decker's at Richmond, for the production of this excellent Fruit, which Mr Henry Telende his judicious Gardener has render'd so easy and intelligible, that I hope to see the Ananas flourish for the future in many of our English Gardens, to see the honour of the Artist, and the Satisfaction and Pleasure of those who can afford to eat them.

== Urban development ==
He developed part of south-east Dublin in the Georgian style. This included:

- An Act to enclose the centre of Merrion Square in 1791;
- The design of Fitzwilliam Square from 1789, laid out in 1792;
- A new Roman Catholic church at Booterstown in 1812 called the Church of the Assumption;
- An Act to enclose the centre of Fitzwilliam Square in 1813.

== Mistress ==
FitzWilliam never married but in the late 1780s it was discovered that starting in 1784 he had a six-year romance with a 15-year-old French Opera dancer from Paris, Marie Anne Bernard (born 1769), known to him by her stage name Zacharie. The relationship was brought to light when a collection of 299 of her letters sent to FitzWilliam was found amongst his papers at Wilton House in Wiltshire, the seat of the Herbert family, Earls of Pembroke, descendants of his cousin and heir George Herbert, 11th Earl of Pembroke. The letters make it clear that he fathered three illegitimate children by Zacharie, namely a daughter who died in infancy and two sons, Bily (whose existence is untraceable) and Fitz, who together with his own wife and children later moved to Richmond, Surrey, close to his natural father, who provided for him in his will. Zacharie's last letter is dated December 1790, during the French Revolution, and details of her future life are unknown.

== Death and succession ==
He died unmarried and without legitimate progeny on 4 February 1816, in Bond Street, Mayfair, London, having a few months previously fallen off a ladder in his library when he broke a knee. He was buried at St Mary Magdalene, Richmond, where survives his inscribed monument, now affixed to an outside wall. His titles devolved by law successively on his younger brothers, namely John FitzWilliam, 8th Viscount FitzWilliam (1752–1830) and then to Thomas FitzWilliam, 9th Viscount FitzWilliam (1755–1833), following whose death without issue in 1833 they became extinct.

He bequeathed his large Irish estates to George Herbert, 11th Earl of Pembroke (1759–1827), his first cousin's son, and his art collection and library to the University of Cambridge, together with funds to house them, which became the Fitzwilliam Museum.

== See also ==
- Viscount FitzWilliam

== Sources ==
- Blacker, Beaver Henry (1887). "Fitzwilliam, Richard" . In Stephen, Leslie (ed.). Dictionary of National Biography. Vol. 9. London: Smith, Elder & Co.
- Blacker, B. H. "Fitzwilliam, Richard, seventh Viscount Fitzwilliam of Merrion (1745–1816)". Oxford Dictionary of National Biography (online ed.). Oxford University Press. doi:10.1093/ref:odnb/9660. (Subscription, Wikipedia Library access or UK public library membership required.)
- Hansard 1803–2005: contributions in Parliament by Richard FitzWilliam

Parliament of the United Kingdom
Preceded by William Gerard Hamilton; Lord Herbert	Member of Parliament for Wilton; 1790–1800; With: Lord Herbert to 1794; Philip Goldsworthy from 1794	Succeeded by Parliament of the United Kingdom
Parliament of the United Kingdom
Preceded by Parliament of Great Britain	Member of Parliament for Wilton; 1801 – February 1806; With: Philip Goldsworthy to 1801; John Spencer 1801–1804; Ralph Sheldon from 1804	Succeeded by Charles Herbert; Ralph Sheldon
Peerage of Ireland
Preceded by Richard FitzWilliam	Viscount FitzWilliam; 1776–1816	Succeeded by John FitzWilliam
