= Mount Merrion =

Suburb of Dublin, Ireland

Mount Merrion Cnoc Mhuirfean (Irish)
- Suburb
- Location in Dublin
- Coordinates: 53°17′46″N 6°12′44″W
- Country: Ireland
- Province: Leinster
- Traditional county: County Dublin
- County: Dún Laoghaire–Rathdown

Population (2019)
  - Urban: 4,563
- Time zone: UTC+0 (WET)
  - Summer (DST): UTC-1 (IST (WEST))
- Eircode routing key: A94
- Area code: 01 (+3531)
- Irish Grid Reference: O191291

Mount Merrion (Irish: Cnoc Mhuirfean) is a suburb of Dublin, Ireland. It is roughly 7 kilometres (5 mi) south of Dublin city centre and is situated on and around the hill of the same name.

== Location and access ==
Mount Merrion is 3 kilometres (2 mi) southwest of the area known as Merrion and 5.6 km west of Dún Laoghaire. As one travels south from the city centre, Mount Merrion is the first neighbourhood of any significant elevation above sea level. The main road in Mount Merrion is Deerpark Road.

=== Transport ===
The main artery through the area is the N11 dual carriageway. Public transport is provided by Dublin Bus on routes 7b, 7d, 11, 47, 116, 118, E1 and E2 and by Go-Ahead on route S6. The nearest DART station to Mount Merrion is Blackrock, while the nearest Luas stops are Kilmacud and Stillorgan on the Green line. The Aircoach services to Dublin Airport from Greystones calls at South Hill Avenue en route to the airport.

== History ==
=== Mount Merrion the Old ===
Quoting from "Mount Merrion the Old", by Sir Neville Wilkinson:

Between the Convent of Mount Anville, above Dundrum, and the broad high road which leads to Stillorgan, rises the wooded hill of Mount Merrion, the centre of the landscape over Dublin Bay, which gradually becomes defined as the opalescent mists of the Irish sunrise fade away.

It is a landscape known to every visitor to Ireland who has stood on deck as the Holyhead mail steamer passes the Kish lightship. Around the wood some 1.2 km² (300 acres) of the richest grazing land in County Dublin slope gently to the high stone wall which surrounds the demesne. To the south and south-west, the horizon is bounded by the swelling outline of the Wicklow and Dublin Hills. To the north, the long low line of the Mourne Mountains, 100 kilometres (60 mi) and more away, are clearly visible when recent rains have left the washed air clear, while the islands of Lambay and Ireland's Eye give an added beauty to the sea-scape which lies beyond the wind-blown causeway which leads on and up to the rhododendron covered slopes above the ancient castle of Howth.

A double avenue of beech trees shades the roadway which runs, straight as a rule, for a full quarter of a mile to the entrance gates on the Stillorgan Road. This roadway, whose immaculate pebbled surface was raked daily, had a broad border of century-old shaven turf, the pride of the Scottish gardener; so tended, brushed and rolled was it in those days that the most careless visitor would have hesitated to sully the velvety perfection of the surface with a profane foot. Yet the gardener, his voice, with its rich Highland brogue quivering with fury at the bare recollection, would tell how a distinguished citizen of Dublin, having ridden to pay his respects to his lordship, had, on departing, cantered gaily down the sacred border, divots flying from his horse's heels; so that the whole length was scarred and pitted with hoofmarks, as though the plague had passed over it, and it was only after months of patient labour that the unbroken serenity of the surface was restored.

=== Fitzwilliam family ===
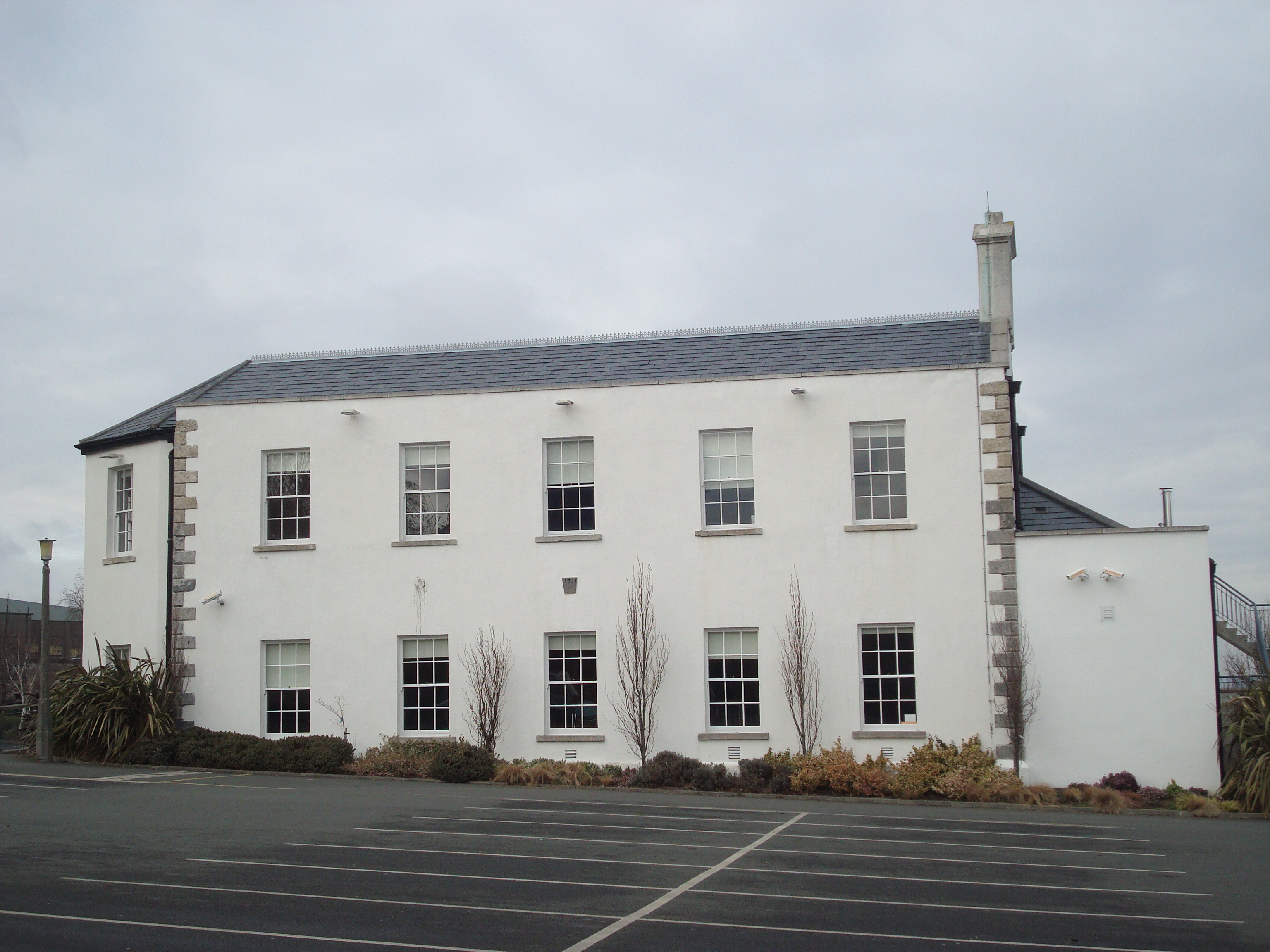
Remnant of Mount Merrion House

The lands came into the possession of the Norman Fitzwilliam family in the 15th century. The family was originally based in Dundrum having come to Ireland in the year 1210.

The Fitzwilliams inherited Merrion Castle from Sir John Cruys, who built the castle on lands which are today the property of the Sisters of Charity and St Mary's Home and School for the Blind. Merrion features on the 1598 map, "A Modern Depiction of Ireland, One of the British Isles" (by Abraham Ortelius as "Mergon").

By 1710, the castle was in such a bad state of repair that Richard, the 5th Viscount Fitzwilliam, selected 100 acres (0.4 km^{2}) on which he built Mount Merrion House, surrounding the house by an 8-foot-high (2.4 m) granite wall. The house was completed in 1711 and served as a new seat by the 5th Viscount Fitzwilliam on the hill at Mount Merrion. The Fitzwilliam family left for England around 1726. Although the family no longer lived in Mount Merrion House, they retained possession of it, and rented the house out.

The next Fitzwilliam to take a major interest in Mount Merrion was Richard FitzWilliam, 7th Viscount FitzWilliam, who remained a bachelor all his life. It was he who willed £100,000 to build the Fitzwilliam Museum in Cambridge, his former university. Prior to his death in 1816, he bequeathed his vast estates to his cousin George Herbert, 11th Earl of Pembroke. Mount Merrion was occupied for a time by the Fitzwilliam agent Barbara Verschoyle and her husband, then Lord Herbert of Lea, and later by Sir Neville Wilkinson, from 1903 to 1914.

On first edition OSI Maps (early to mid-19th century), the townland is named 'Mount Merrion or Callary', and that name is still in evidence by Callary Road which runs to the east of Foster Ave.

=== Deer Park ===
Deer Park was landscaped by the 5th Viscount Fitzwilliam. The parklands comprise the area behind the site of Mount Merrion House. The park is now open to the public. It was created in 1971 from a collection of open public spaces and some acquisitions of private land. The park contains both sporting facilities (Association Football (soccer) and Gaelic football pitches, as well as the Deerpark Tennis Club), and landscaped land for more informal pursuits. Its location and altitude also provide it with a great view of Dublin city towards the north, which is often used by photographers for panoramas and also by developers to assess the impact of development on the cityscape. Crowds also gather in Deerpark to look out at the annual Skyfest fireworks display around St. Patrick's Weekend which is sometimes held in Dublin city centre. It can also be a good vantage point for observing the Northern Lights, also known as the Aurora Borealis when they are visible in the Dublin area. It is claimed that Strongbow's white stallion is buried somewhere in Deer Park.

"Perhaps the most interesting remaining part of the 18th-century development is the landscape element. The present Deerpark is a public park to the west of the house and included a wooded area which corresponds exactly to the walled woodland area laid out with radial paths shown on the earliest map (1757). The position of the 'gazebo' is now a platform with an assembly of cut stone elements lying on the ground, the origin of the material is not known to me. I believe that the radial form of the landscape can still be detected and consider that this may offer scope for an exercise in landscape conservation" (from historical research carried out by Denis Cogan, 1999).

Maps such as John Roque's (1760) and Barker's Estate Maps (1762) show much of what is now Deerpark as a formal walled garden and many of the prominent avenues and boundaries of the nearby Mount Merrion House lands form the basis of the present local road network.

=== 20th century ===
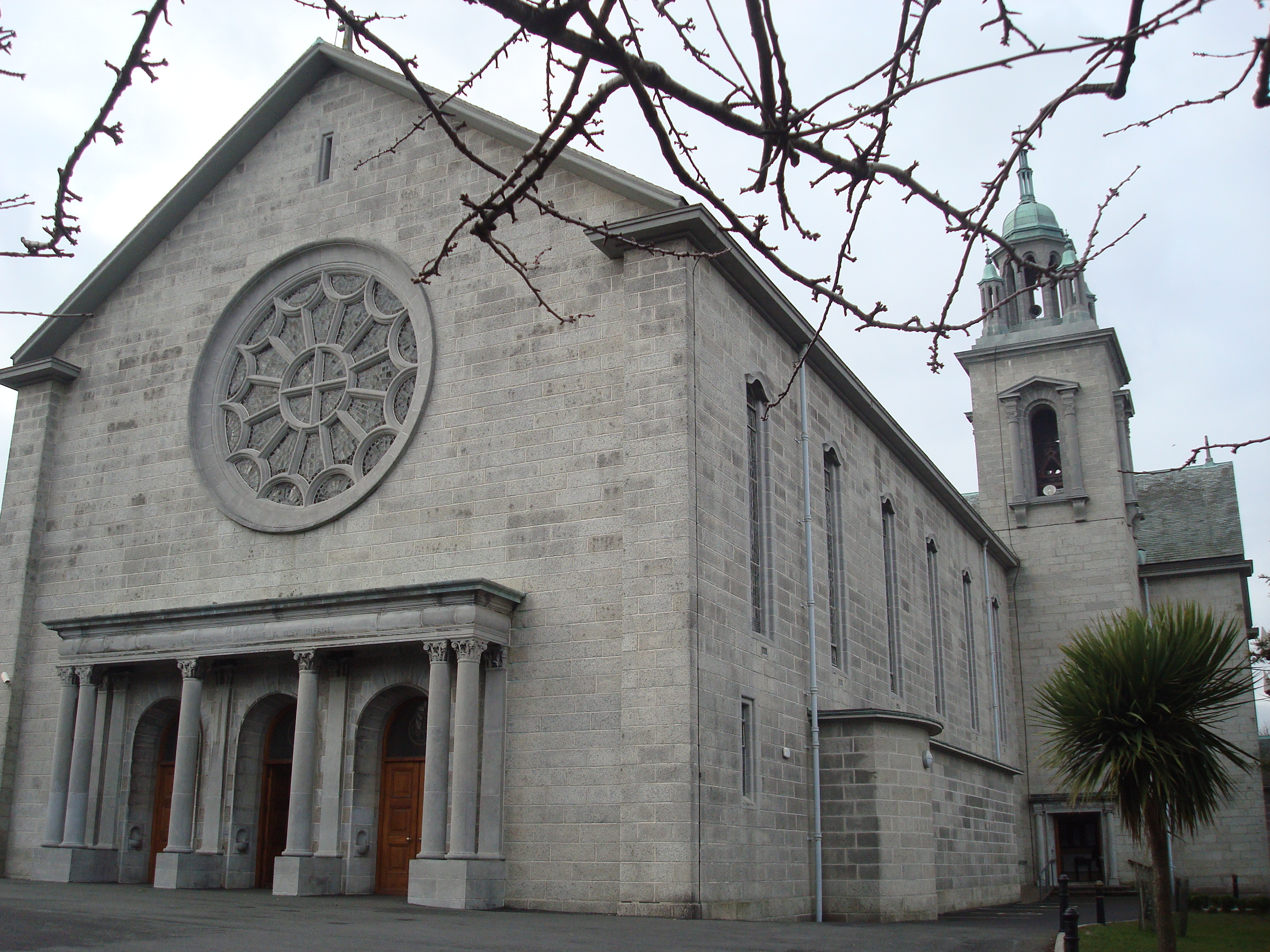
Church of St Therese

The estate at Mount Merrion began being sold off to property developers (Mount Merrion Estates) around 1925, as this area of Dublin rapidly built up with suburban housing in the mid-20th century. Mount Merrion House itself was sold to the Catholic Church in 1936. The main house was converted for use as a Catholic church. A new church, the Church of St Therese, was built alongside in 1956. Much of the house was demolished during the late 1970s. However, the front block of the house was retained and a new community centre was built onto the back of it. Plans for recent construction work on the community centre originally involved the demolition of the house, however, the plans were amended due to protests. The stables survive beside the church. The original granite gateway was salvaged and now stands as the entrance to Willow Park School on Rock Road (Willow Park's own original gateway on Booterstown Avenue was later removed). Part of the estate eventually became the Fitzwilliam Lawn Tennis Club. These lands were part of the Fitzwilliam and later Pembroke Estates.

After the move of University College Dublin to its Belfield campus, many students chose to live in the area.

== Amenities ==
On Deerpark Road are two restaurants, a newsagency, a chemist, and various other service and retail facilities. The area also has a Catholic church and school.

== Sport ==
Deerpark now hosts sports such as football and tennis. The football pitches are used by Mount Merrion Youths Football Club and Kilmacud Croke's GAC.

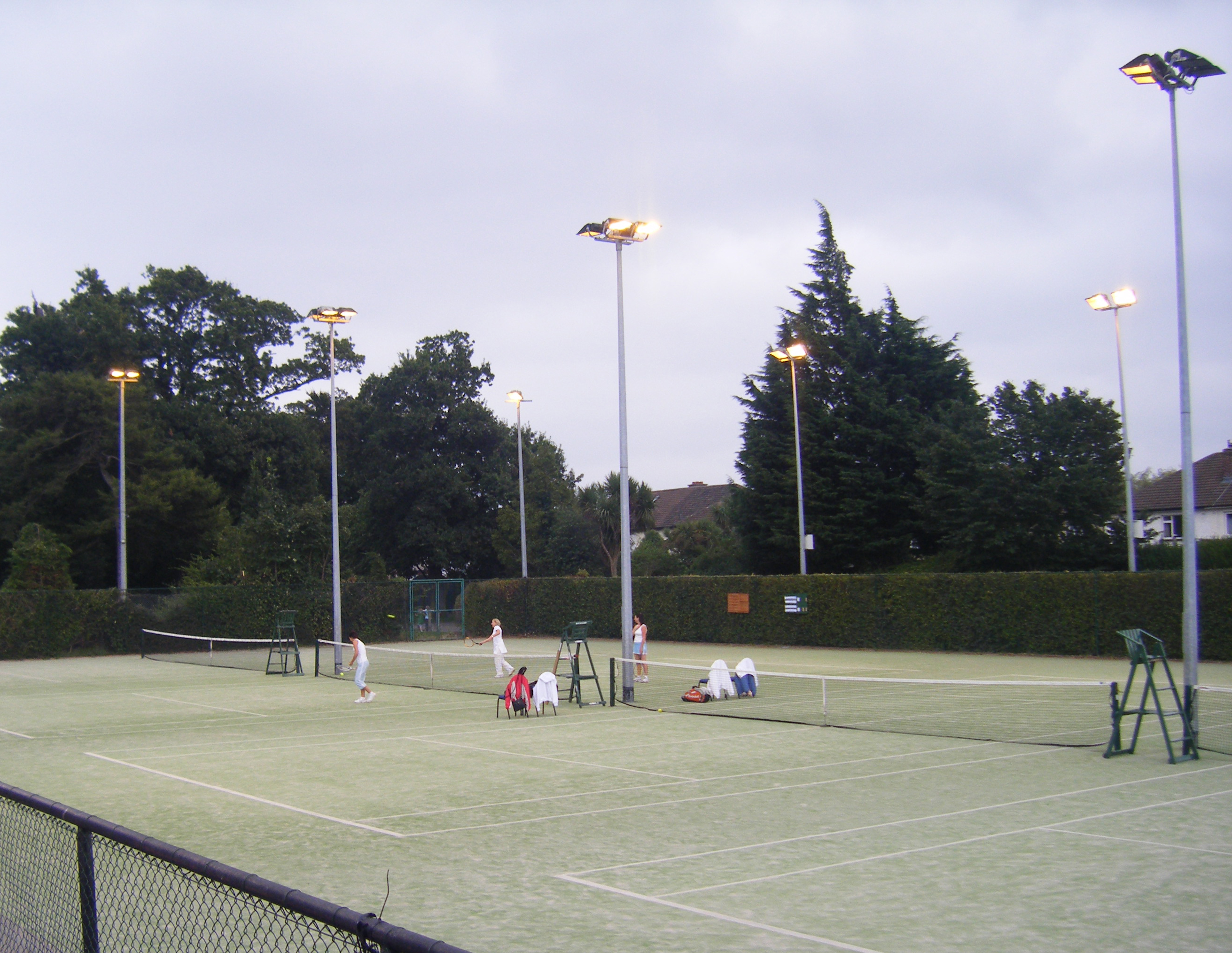
Deerpark Tennis Club

Deerpark Tennis Club is a community tennis club, founded in the 1970s. The tennis club, established in 1976, is known as Deerpark Tennis Club. The club has six synthetic surface courts, all floodlit. Competitions are organised throughout the year. The club participates in the Dublin Lawn Tennis Council (DLTC) Leagues in the greater Dublin area. Deerpark opened its new clubhouse in August 2010.

Mount Merrion Youths Football Club is a community-based club. The club first represented Mount Merrion at the 1974 Community Games. In 2007 the club established its first representative all-girls team. All representatives of the club operate on a voluntary basis. In 2005, the club's under-18 representatives won the Leinster Football Association Youths' Cup.

Although there is no GAA club in Mount Merrion, some residents play for Kilmacud Crokes who play their juvenile matches in Deer Park. A local school, Scoil San Treasa, plays both Gaelic football and hurling.

== Politics ==
The district is in the Dublin Rathdown electoral constituency, and Dún Laoghaire–Rathdown (following the abolition, in 1994, of County Dublin as an administrative division of the state).

== Notable persons ==
- Bagatelle, 1970s/1980s pop group
- Aifric Campbell, author
- Don Cockburn, RTE journalist, Gaelgeoir & newsreader
- Ray D'Arcy, RTE presenter
- Catherine Day, Irish civil servant, Secretary-General of the European Commission
- Éamon de Valera, revolutionary and politician, Taoiseach and President of Ireland
- Emma Donoghue, author, Academy Award-nominated screenwriter
- Dave Fanning, RTE radio broadcaster
- Josepha Madigan, government minister
- Dermot Morgan, RTE comic actor, Father Ted
- Paddy Murray journalist and writer
- Éamon Ó Cuív, politician, grandson of Eamonn De Valera.
