= Merrion Castle =

Demolished castle in Dublin, Ireland

Coordinates: 53.315°N 6.205°W

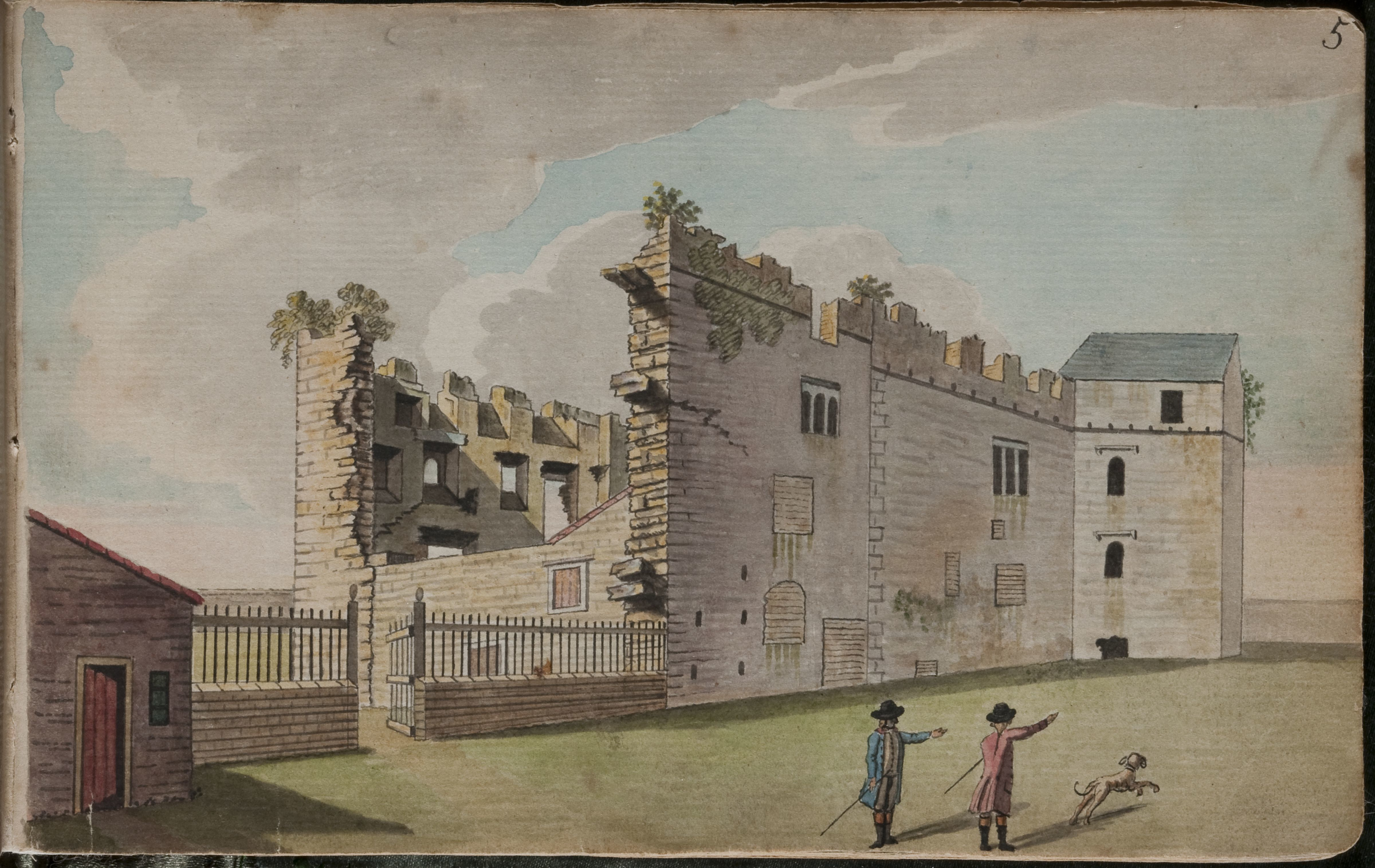
Watercolour of Merrion Castle, painted by Gabriel Beranger in the mid to late 18th century

Merrion Castle was a castle situated about 300m south of the present-day Merrion Gates, to the south of Dublin city centre. Built in the early fourteenth century, it was from the sixteenth century to the early eighteenth century the principal seat of the Fitzwilliam family, who acquired the title Viscount Fitzwilliam. After the Fitzwiliams moved to Mount Merrion House in about 1710 the castle fell into ruin, and it was demolished in 1780, though there were remains visible as late as 1837. No trace of Merrion Castle survives today. It was located opposite Merrion Gates, on the site of St. Mary's Home and School for the Blind. Its location, and the modern site of St.Mary's, can be seen on historical maps, including the six-inch (1829-1841) Ordnance Survey of Ireland maps.

== Early history ==
The first mention of a castle at Merrion is in about 1334, when the property was in the possession of Thomas Bagod, who was probably a grandson of that Sir Robert Bagod who had built Baggotrath Castle about 1280. In about 1366 Merrion came into the possession of Sir John Cruys or Cruise, a leading landowner, diplomat and soldier, who died in 1407. It is generally said that he built the first permanent structure on the site. In the fifteenth century both castles came into the possession of the Fitzwilliam family, who over the years became the most substantial landowners in Dublin; James Fitzwilliam, the Chief Baron of the Irish Exchequer, married Sir John Cruise's daughter. Until the late sixteenth-century Baggotrath was the Fitzwilliams' most favoured residence, for possession of which they fought a bitter private war with the Cornwalsh family in the 1440s, and were even prepared to resort to murder to assert their rights. It was Sir Thomas Fitzwilliam, grandfather of the first Viscount, who in the reign of Elizabeth I made Merrion Castle the principal family residence.

== Civil War and Restoration ==
During the English Civil War, possession of such a strong fortress close to Dublin was of crucial importance to both sides in the conflict. The Fitzwilliams, who were staunch Royalists, installed a strong garrison; but in June 1642 the castle was betrayed to the Parliamentary side, and remained in Parliament's hands until the Restoration. The second Viscount, Oliver Fitzwilliam, later Earl of Tyrconnell, who had considerable influence with Oliver Cromwell's son Henry, pleaded for its return, but without success. Given the traditional loyalty of his family to the Stuart dynasty, he might well have expected its speedy recovery in 1660; but the bitter divisions in post-Restoration Ireland, which saw Tyrconnell accused by his enemies of having been a supporter of Oliver Cromwell, caused a delay in the full restitution of his lands, and he did not recover Merrion until 1663.

Though it had suffered much damage during the military occupation, Merrion was still a substantial dwelling. For the purpose of the hearth tax in 1662-3, it was assessed at sixteen hearths, making it one of the largest private dwellings in Dublin. Lord Tyrconnell in his last years did much to improve the castle, where he died in 1667. It remained the main family residence until 1710 when Richard FitzWilliam, 5th Viscount FitzWilliam began the building of Mount Merrion House.

== Ruins ==
After 1710, the castle was entirely abandoned and it quickly fell into decay. By the late 1720s, it seems to have been little more than a ruin, and the newspapers reported that the site was infested with large and savage rodents called marmonts. The "marmont" was almost certainly the brown rat, which is recorded in Ireland from 1722, a few years ahead of its first appearance in England.

Gabriel Beranger sketched the ruins around 1765. The Irish antiquarian Austin Cooper (1759–1830) surveyed the ruins in May 1780, but on a second visit found the castle being demolished. In A Topographical Dictionary of Ireland, published in 1837, it is stated that some ivy covered ruins of the castle still existed at that time.
