= Viscount FitzWilliam =

- Arms: Lozengy Or and Gules. Crest: In front of a Peacock’s Tail proper, a Greyhound’s Head erased Argent, spotted Gules, plain collared Or. Supporters: On either side an Ostrich Argent, holding in the beak a Horseshoe Or.
- Creation date: 5 August 1629
- Created by: Charles I
- Peerage: Peerage of Ireland
- First holder: Thomas FitzWilliam, 1st Viscount FitzWilliam
- Last holder: Thomas FitzWilliam, 9th Viscount FitzWilliam
- Subsidiary titles: Baron FitzWilliam
- Status: Extinct
- Extinction date: January 1833
- Motto: DEO ADJUVENTE NON TIMENDUM (God assist us, nothing is to be feared)

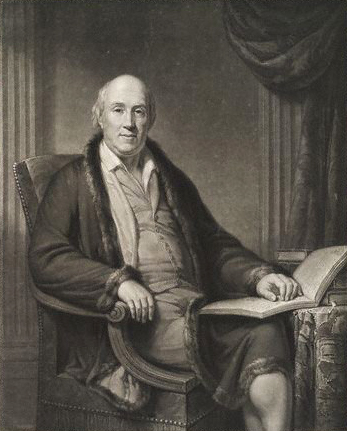
Richard FitzWilliam, 7th Viscount FitzWilliam

Viscount FitzWilliam, of Merrion in the County of Dublin, was a title in the Peerage of Ireland. It was created in 1629 for Thomas FitzWilliam, along with the subsidiary title Baron FitzWilliam, of Thorncastle in the County of Dublin, also in the Peerage of Ireland. He was succeeded by his son Oliver, the second Viscount. In 1661 Oliver was created Earl of Tyrconnell in the Peerage of Ireland. The earldom became extinct on his death in 1667, but he was succeeded in the barony and viscountcy by his younger brother William FitzWilliam, the third Viscount. William's grandson Richard, the fifth Viscount, represented Fowey in the British Parliament. His son Richard, the sixth Viscount, was a member of both the Irish and English Privy Councils. The seventh Viscount was a benefactor and musical antiquarian. The titles became extinct on the death of the ninth Viscount in 1833.

The family seat was Mount Merrion House, County Dublin: they also owned Baggotrath Castle and Merrion Castle, both of which have long since disappeared. The Viscounts FitzWilliam had no direct relationship with the Earls FitzWilliam. They are recorded in Ireland from the beginning of the thirteenth century, and through acquisition of large estates in Dublin, became within a few generations one of its dominant families. Their Dublin estates passed by inheritance to the Earl of Pembroke, whose descendants are still substantial landowners in the area.

== Viscounts FitzWilliam (1629) ==
- Thomas FitzWilliam, 1st Viscount FitzWilliam (1581–1650)
- Oliver FitzWilliam, 1st Earl of Tyrconnell, 2nd Viscount Fitzwilliam (died 1667) (created Earl of Tyrconnell in 1661)

== Earls of Tyrconnell (1661) ==
- Oliver FitzWilliam, 1st Earl of Tyrconnell, 2nd Viscount Fitzwilliam (died 1667)

== Viscounts FitzWilliam (1629; Reverted) ==
- William FitzWilliam, 3rd Viscount FitzWilliam (died 1670)
- Thomas FitzWilliam, 4th Viscount FitzWilliam (died 1704)
- Richard FitzWilliam, 5th Viscount FitzWilliam (1677–1743)
- Richard FitzWilliam, 6th Viscount FitzWilliam (1711–1776)
- Richard FitzWilliam, 7th Viscount FitzWilliam (1745–1816)
- John FitzWilliam, 8th Viscount FitzWilliam (1752–1830)
- Thomas FitzWilliam, 9th Viscount FitzWilliam (1755–1833)
