= Monkstown Parish Church, Dublin =

Monkstown Parish Church
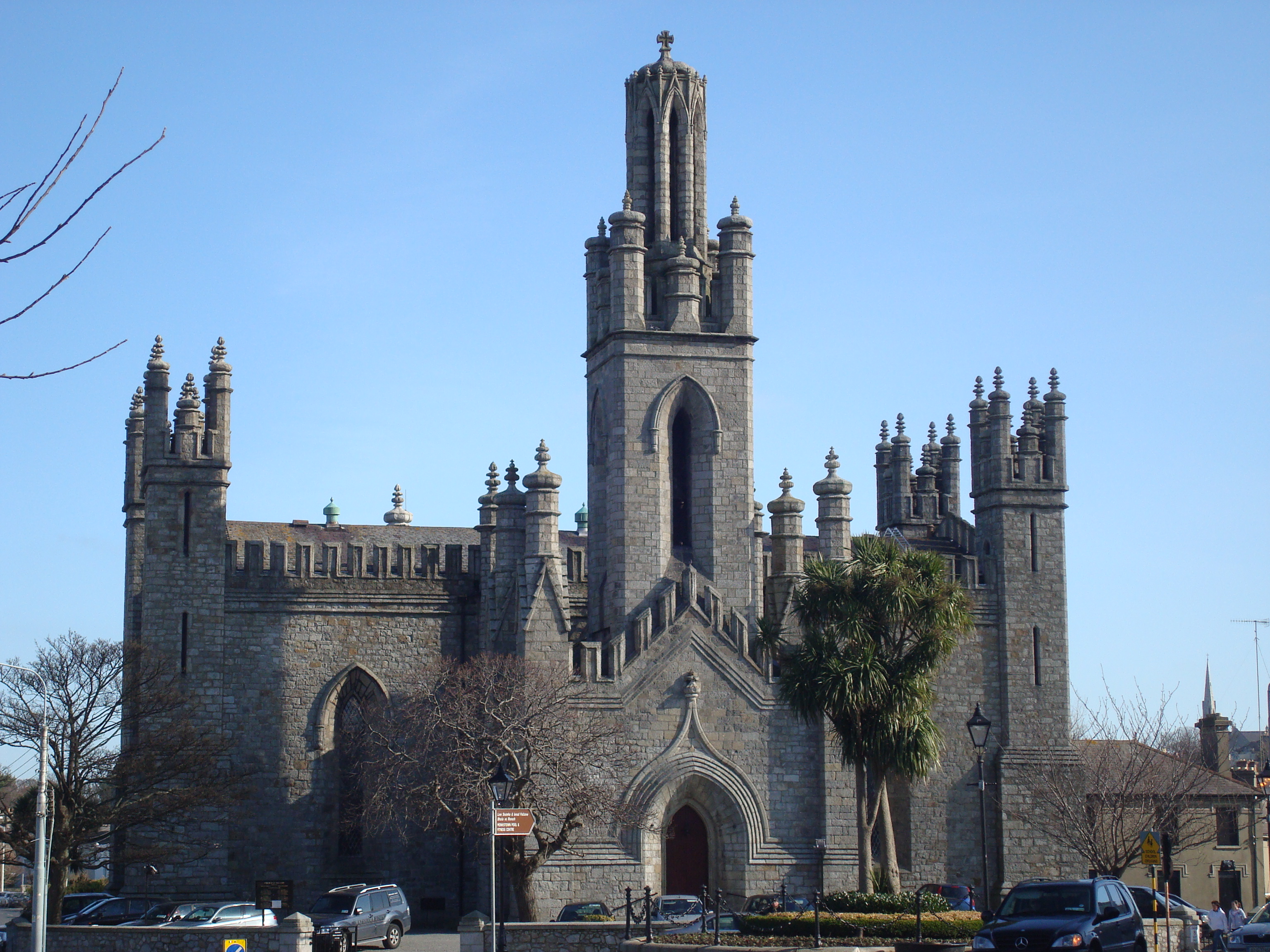
- Monkstown Parish Church
- 53.29359°N 6.15306°W
- Location: Monkstown, Dublin
- Country: Ireland
- Denomination: Anglicanism
- Website: monkstown.dublin.anglican.org

History
- Founded: 1830s

Architecture
- Architect(s): John Semple; John McCurdy
- Style: French Gothic Revival

Administration
- Province: Province of Dublin
- Diocese: Diocese of Dublin and Glendalough
- Parish: Monkstown

Clergy
- Rector: Canon Roy H. Byrne

Monkstown Parish Church (Irish: Eaglais Bhaile na Manach), is a 19th Century Anglican church in Monkstown, Dublin, Ireland. It was built to replace an earlier church in Carrickbrennan Churchyard. Designed by architect John Semple, it has a distinct style and has been described as occupying a space somewhere between the Gothic and Saracenic architectural styles.

== History ==
When an earlier church in Carrickbrennan Churchyard was no longer sufficient to support the growing population of the parish, it was decided to build a new church, at the site of the current structure. This church was completed in 1789, and was a simpler structure than the elaborate church that stands today. It was of a design similar to that of Taney Parish church, which still stands today. By 1818 this new church was itself described as being 'always much crowded'—despite being 'one of the largest [...] in Ireland'—and the decision was made by Archbishop William Magge to extend the church.

Following this decision the architect John Semple of the Board of First Fruits was engaged. Semple began drawing up plans in 1823, and the previous church was demolished in 1828. The new church was opened on Christmas Day, 1831. Where the old church could accommodate a congregation of 340, the new building had capacity for 1,200. Even then the church was too small, with attendance that day said to be 1,300

In 1868, the church was extended by John McCurdy, with the addition of a chancel to the same style as the original design of John Semple.

In 2007, conservation work began on the church, with assistance from the Irish Georgian Society.

The church contains a memorial to members of the parish killed or missing during the Crimean War and the Great War.

== Architecture ==
The building, designed by John Semple, is sui generis, and takes inspiration from both Gothic and Saracenic architecture. Though widely celebrated today, the design was much criticised in its day. Semple's designs are considered among the most distinctive of those funded by the Board of First Fruits, with the church at Monkstown provided as a prominent example.

=== Interior ===
The ceiling of the church features corbelled fan vaulting and is rendered in scalloped plaster, which align with the Moorish elements of the exterior.

=== Exterior ===
The church is built of local granite from Dalkey. The church features narrow lancet windows with hood mouldings on the walls of the transept, as well as loop windows inset in the clasping ashlar buttresses. String-coursing runs around the structure at different heights, notably under several windows. The west door features an ogee arch; the doors to the north and south originally also featured such arches but they were removed in the renovations in 1890. One of the most notable features of the church are its slated hexagonal pinnacles, which are topped with finials that resemble chess pieces. The roof's border features a crenellated parapet. The bell tower is adorned with a lantern, ogee arches, and at its peak a Grecian cross.

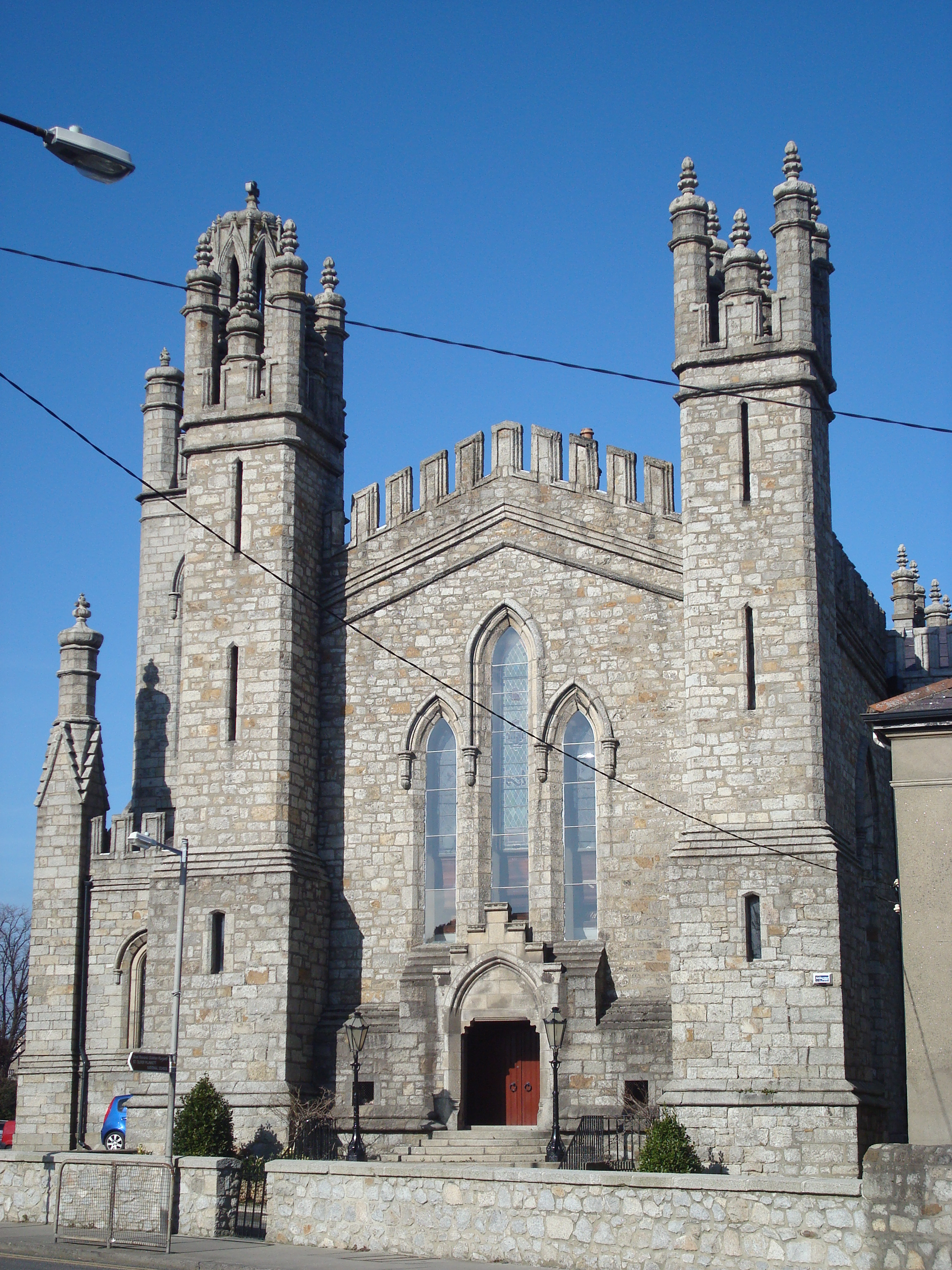
South Entrance

== Rectors ==
Rev. Dr. William FitzGerald served in Monkstown, from 1855 to 1857 when he was elevated to Bishop of Cork, he was succeeded by the Rev. Dr. Ronald MacDonnell who served from 1857 to 1878. Archbishop of Dublin Joseph Peacocke served as rector of Monkstown 1878–94; he had earlier been a curate in the parish from 1863 to 1873. Rev. Canon J. C. Dowse, succeeded Bishop Peacocke as Rector in 1894.

Rev. Kevin Dalton served as rector from 1979 until 2007, he was succeeded by Venerable Patrick Lawrence. The incumbent rector Rev. Canon Roy Byrne is rector since 2016.
