= Merrion Cemetery, Bellevue =

Cemetery in Dublin, Ireland

Coordinates: 53.311926°N 6.202209°W

Merrion Cemetery
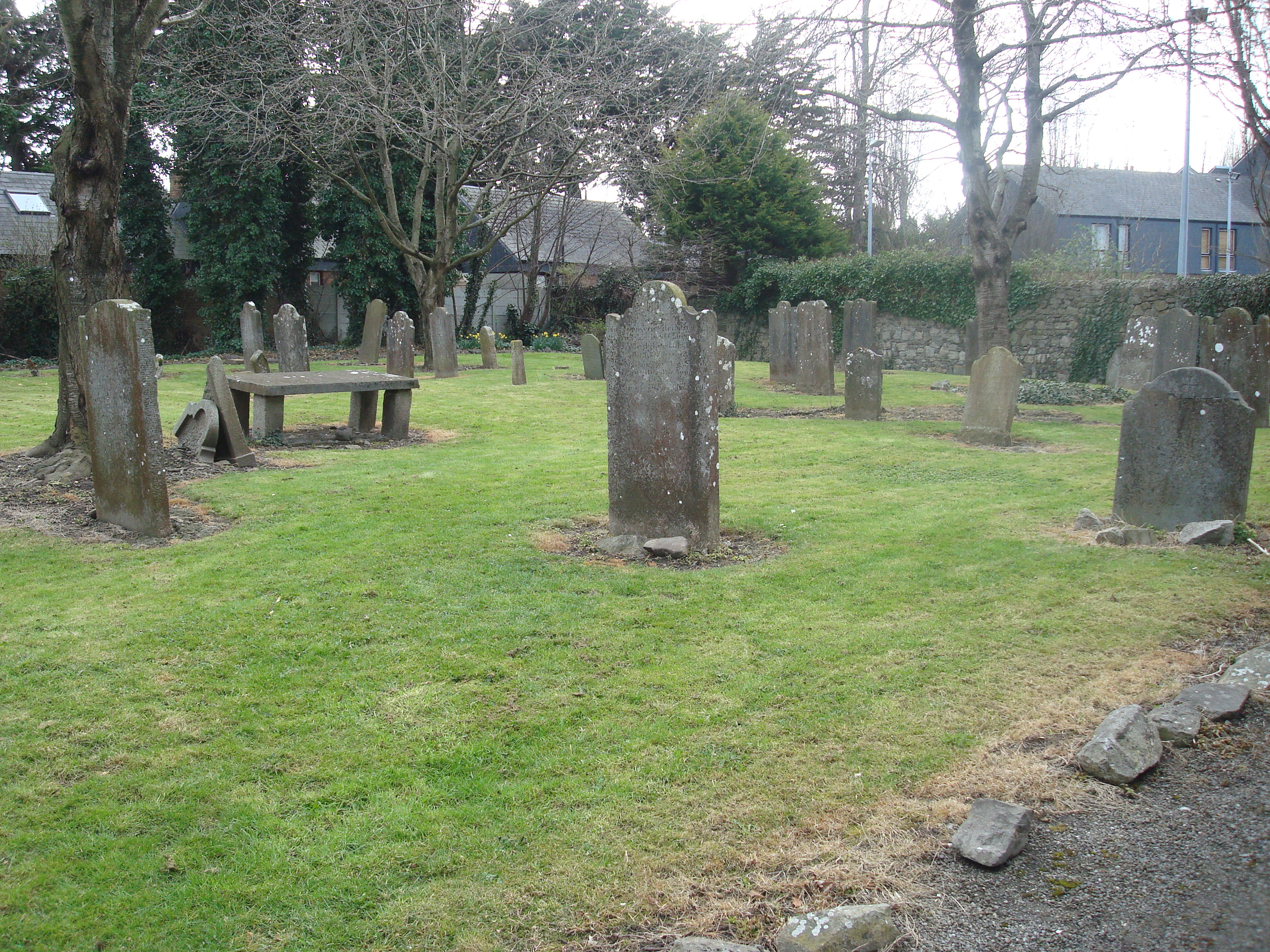
- Interactive map of Merrion Cemetery

Details
- Established: c. 1300
- Closed: 1886
- Location: Bellevue Avenue, Booterstown, Dún Laoghaire–Rathdown
- Country: Ireland
- Type: Church of Ireland
- Size: 1,730 m^{2} (18,600 sq ft)
- Find a Grave: Merrion Cemetery

Merrion Cemetery, Bellevue (Irish: Reilig Mhuirfean) is a cemetery located on Bellevue Avenue off the Merrion Road in Dublin, Ireland a short distance to the north west of Booterstown. The recently demolished "Tara Towers" hotel was adjacent to the graveyard. The cemetery was in use from 1300 to 1866. Since 1978 it has been used as a public park under the care of Dublin City Council

== History ==
It is not known when the graveyard was consecrated, but there used to be a church here and thought to have been erected in the 14th century by John Cruise of Merrion Castle. There are no remains of the church today.

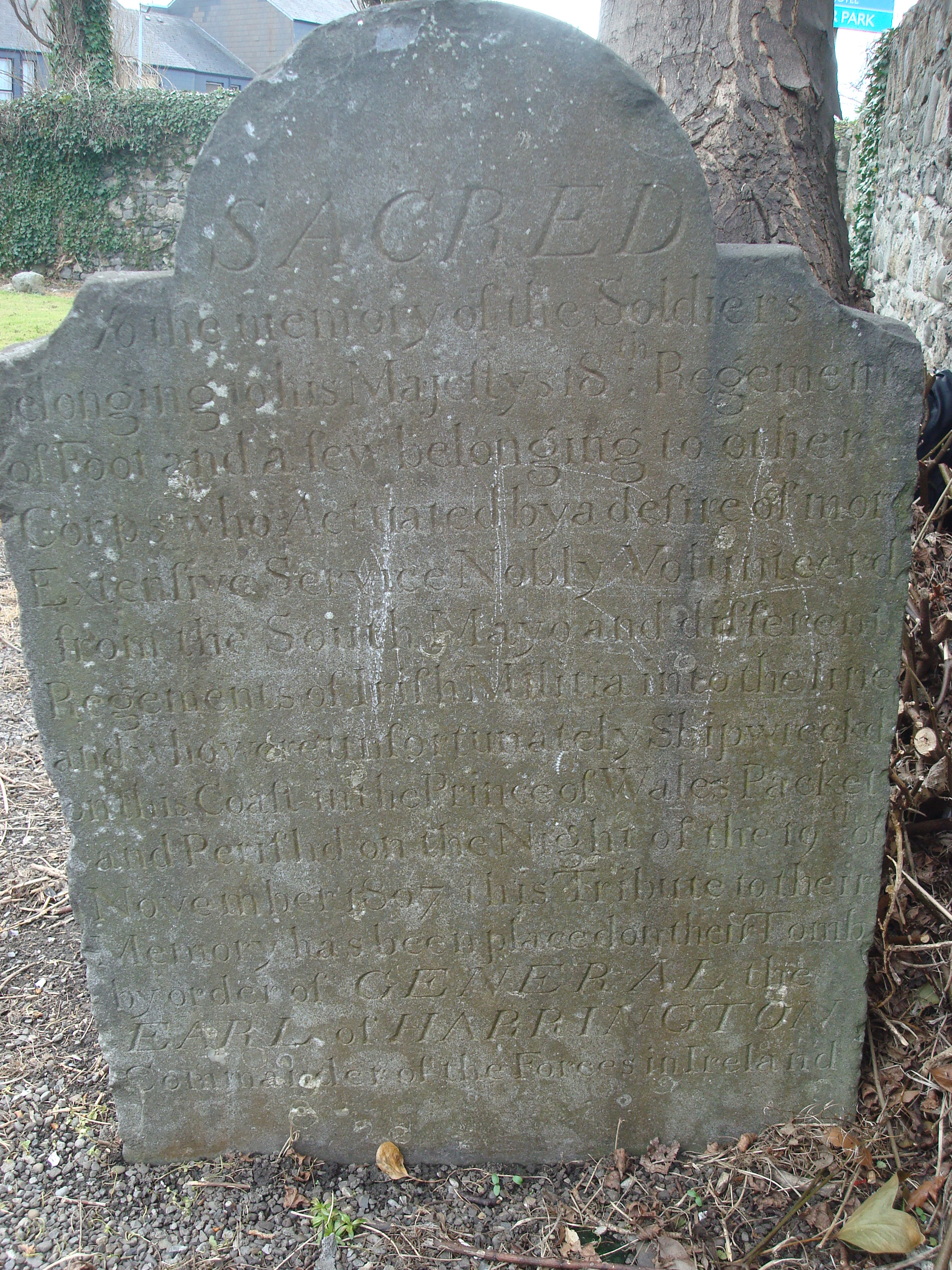
Tombstone to the 120 soldiers who died in the shipwreck of HM Packet Ship Prince of Wales along the coast in 1807

The most notable burial here is of the 120 soldiers of the transport packet called the Prince of Wales. The ship had set sail from Dun Leary on 18 November 1807, but by the next day it had to return due to a very bad snow storm. As the ship tried to return to the harbour, it struck rocks at Seapoint and sank drowning all 120 soldiers on board, who were members of the 18th Regiment of Foot. That same night the Rochdale also sank where 265 people perished. Most of them are interred in Carrickbrennan Churchyard with a similar memorial.

There are not many memorials to be seen here and the oldest one is dated 1692.

On 1 May 1866 the graveyard closed and in 1978 the graveyard became a public park under the care of Dublin City Council.

== See also ==
- The Sinking of the Rochdale and the Prince of Wales
