= Sinking of Rochdale and Prince of Wales =

1807 maritime disaster

Coordinates: 53.301603°N 6.157072°W

Rochdale and Prince of Wales were two troop ships that sank in Dublin Bay, off Ireland, in 1807.

Dublin Port had long been dangerous because it was accessible only at high tide and was subject to sudden storms. Many ships were lost while waiting for the tide, but little was done until this disaster. The impact of 400 bodies being washed up on an urban shore affected public and official opinion. This event was the impetus for the building of Dún Laoghaire Harbour.

On 19 November 1807, several ships left Dublin carrying troops bound for the Napoleonic Wars. The next day, two ships, the brig Rochdale and H.M. packet ship Prince of Wales, were caught in gale-force winds and heavy snow and foundered. Troops on Prince of Wales may have been deliberately locked below deck while the ship's captain and crew escaped. No lifeboat was launched. There was looting.

== Maritime background ==
This tragedy was the impetus for the building of Dún Laoghaire Harbour, which was initially called "Dunleary", then "Kingstown", and now "Dún Laoghaire". Dublin port was hampered by a sandbar, which meant that ships could enter or leave only at high tide. A solution, the building of the North Bull Wall, had been identified by Vice-Admiral William Bligh in 1800. If there were a storm, a ship would have to ride out the storm in the open sea, waiting for the tide.

"The bay of Dublin has perhaps been more fatal to seamen and ships than any in the world, for a ship once caught in it in a gale of wind from ENE to SSE must ride it out at anchors or go on shore, and from the nature of that shore the whole of the crews almost invariably have perished." – Captain Charles Malcolm of George IV's royal yacht.

A pier had been built at Dún Laoghaire, now known as the "coal harbour", in 1767, but it had rapidly silted up. The early nineteenth century was unusually stormy. Dublin Bay was notoriously treacherous for boats. The remains of at least 600 vessels rest at the bottom of the bay.

On 19 November 1807, the sea began to swell. Wind speed increased to hurricane force. Sleet and snow fell to such intensity that visibility was reduced to zero; they may not have realised how close they were to shore. The east wind blew the ships back towards the shore.

While Rochdale and Prince of Wales were lost, another troop transport, Lark, which left earlier, safely reached Holyhead. Other ships were lost at that time. A collier was lost at the South Bull (outside Dublin Port). The inbound Liverpool packet was lost off Bray.

== Military background ==
In July 1807, following military successes, Napoleon signed the Treaties of Tilsit with Russia and Prussia leaving him master of central and eastern Europe. He then turned his attention westward to Spain and Portugal. The British government was alarmed. Soldiers were recruited to defend England's coast and to intervene in Spain (see Peninsular War) under Wellington.

Fear of an invasion of Ireland was further met by the building of Martello Towers on the southern and eastern coasts and watchtowers on the other coastlines.

French troops had invaded Ireland on 22 August 1798, under General Humbert, establishing the short-lived Republic of Connacht. On that occasion the Mayo Militia was ingloriously defeated in what became known as the Races of Castlebar. In 1807 many members of the North Mayo and South Mayo Militias volunteered and were lost from the Prince of Wales. They joined the 97th Regiment of Foot, the Minorca Regiment, which was known as the "Queens Own Germans" as it was initially formed from Swiss and German mercenaries. (In 1816, the 97th was renumbered as the 96th).

The North Cork Militia was active in suppressing the Irish Rebellion of 1798. They suffered a defeat at the Battle of Oulart Hill. In 1807, while most joined the 18th Regiment of Foot so many members of the North Cork Militia volunteered that they had to be dispersed over 25 different regiments.

They joined the British Army for a shilling a week and three meals a day – an alternative to terrible poverty.

== HM Packet ship Prince of Wales ==
HM Packet ship Prince of Wales was a sloop of 103 tons with a draught of 11 feet. She was built in Parkgate, Cheshire in 1787.

She sailed under Captain Robert Jones of Liverpool carrying the 97th regiment on 19 November. The next day she had progressed only to a point opposite Bray Head, a matter of a few miles. She cast anchor, but the sea was so violent that she failed to come to anchor; she was blown back past Dún Laoghaire. Her sails were completely torn. She was driven onto rocks at Blackrock. There was just one longboat aboard. Captain Jones, nine seamen, two women with children (family members), and two soldiers escaped on this lifeboat. They did not know where they were, or how close they were to the shore. They rowed parallel to the shore until one of the sailors fell overboard and found that he was standing in shallow water. It was alleged that the troops were locked below deck, the ladder withdrawn, and the hatch battened down. All 120 soldiers drowned in the storm and are interred in Merrion Cemetery not too far from where the incident occurred.

== Rochdale ==
Rochdale was larger than Prince of Wales. She was built in 1797; she was a brig of 135 tons and a ten-foot draught. She sailed under Captain Hodgson. She was driven along a similar path as the Prince of Wales. She cast anchors but the cable snapped. On shore cries of the terrified passengers could be heard. As she swept past Dún Laoghaire, soldiers on board fired their muskets to attract attention. At Salthill, would-be rescuers had to shelter from the gunfire. Off Blackrock, blue lights were seen and gunfire heard. She stuck the rocks at the Seapoint Martello tower. A twelve-foot plank would have rescued them, but all 265, including 42 women and 29 children, on board were lost. Their bodies were unrecognisable, being mutilated by the sea and the rocks. Most of those who perished are interred in Carrickbrennan Churchyard in Monkstown with a memorial.

== Lifeboats ==
Although there were lifeboats stationed at Clontarf, Bullock, Howth, Dún Laoghaire and Islandbridge none were launched.

== Looting ==
There was looting of the ships and the items washed ashore. An immense amount of baggage was washed ashore and troops were put on guard. Looters gathered as was usual at the time and one from Dún Laoghaire was drowned. All the weekend was spent in collecting the bodies for burial. The Regimental Silver Plate of the Queens Own Germans was lost. Rewards were offered. Six persons were convicted and sent to Kilmainham Gaol for plundering bodies or articles.

== Murder charge ==
Captain Robert Jones and his crew survived in the only lifeboat. Two soldiers also survived. The captain was accused of murder. The Captain said that the lifeboat was not launched; rather, it was cast into the sea by the storm, so he ordered those on deck to get into it. Anthony McIntyre of the 18th Royal Irish said that the captain launched the lifeboat and that the ladder from the hold to the deck was withdrawn. Andrew Boyle, also of the 18th Royal Irish, spoke through an Irish interpreter, saying that the ladder was not removed because “persons below held on to it very tightly”. The verdict was "Casual death by shipwreck". The case was dismissed.

== Dún Laoghaire Harbour ==
The Irish Parliament having been abolished, from 1 January 1801 Irish members of parliament had to travel to the House of Commons of the United Kingdom. That meant frequent travel across the Irish Sea. A campaign to build a harbour at Dún Laoghaire was already under way. The person chiefly responsible was a resident Norwegian master mariner and shipbroker named Richard Toucher, who worked tirelessly campaigning to bring about the construction of a safe port. His Asylum Harbour was conceived as a refuge for sailing ships in trouble in Dublin Bay. After this tragedy, the campaign received the support required. The term 'asylum' in this context means a harbour where ships can seek refuge from a storm.

Construction commenced on a packet harbour at Howth, which was completed in 1809. Travelling from Dublin to Howth meant travelling through the 'badlands of Sutton', where coaches were liable to be raided. Howth was a shallow harbour, and as larger ships were built, in particular with the introduction of steam packets from 1819, it became unsuitable, its rocky bottom precluded any dredging.

In 1815, eight Harbour Commissioners were appointed to supervise the building of a new harbour at Dún Laoghaire. George IV visited in 1821, arriving at Howth and departing from Dún Laoghaire. He renamed the town "Kingstown". The name reverted to Dún Laoghaire in 1921.

== Reading ==
- Bourke, Edward J. The sinking of the Rochdale and the Prince of Wales
- Bourke, Edward J. Shipwrecks of the Irish Coast ISBN 0-9523027-2-1
- Blacker, Rev. Beaver Brief Sketches of the Parishes of Booterstown and Donnybrook (Dublin 1860)
- de Courcy Ireland, John, History of Dún Laoghaire Harbour (De Burca Books, 2001) ISBN 0-946130-27-2.
- Scott Roberts, Peter. The Ancestry, Life and Times of Commander John Macgregor Skinner R.N. (Holyhead Maritime Museum, 2007)
