= John Patrick Prendergast =

Irish land agent and historian

John Patrick Prendergast (7 March 1808 – 6 February 1893) was an Irish land agent and historian.

== Life ==
Born on 7 March 1808, at 37 Dawson Street, Dublin, he was eldest son of Francis Prendergast (1768–1846), registrar of the court of chancery of Ireland, by Esther (née Patrick; 1774–1846), eldest daughter of John Patrick, of 27 Palace Row, Dublin. Educated in England at Reading grammar school under Richard Valpy, he graduated at Trinity College Dublin, in 1825, and was called to the Irish Bar in 1830.

In 1836 Prendergast succeeded his father and grandfather in the agency of Lord Clifden's estates, which he administered for many years. His experiences made him an advocate of tenant right and a supporter of the early land reformers in Ireland.

Prendergast died in Dublin on 6 February 1893, aged 84.

== Works ==
In 1840 Prendergast was commissioned to make some pedigree researches in County Tipperary, which led him to a study of the settlement of Ireland at the restoration of Charles II, and also of the Cromwellian settlement. His researches culminated in The History of the Cromwellian Settlement of Ireland (1863, 2nd edit. 1875).

In 1864 Prendergast was appointed by Lord Romilly a commissioner, with Charles William Russell, for selecting official papers relating to Ireland for transcription from the Carte manuscripts in the Bodleian Library. The report of the commissioners was published in 1871. Russell and Prendergast continued to calendar the papers until 1877, when Russell died. Prendergast continued the work until 1880.

Prendergast issued for private circulation The Tory War in Ulster ...Descriptive of Ireland from the Restoration to the Revolution, A.D. 1660-1690 (1868, Dublin, 2 pts.). In 1881 he prefixed a notice of the life of Charles Haliday to the latter's Scandinavian Kingdom of Dublin, and in 1887 he published Ireland from the Restoration to the Revolution.

Prendergast was also an authority on Irish pedigrees and archæology, contributing, among other papers, to the old Kilkenny Archæological Society's Journal, The Plantation of Idrone by Sir Peter Carew. In articles published anonymously in the Dublin press (1884–90) he covered local knowledge of the old houses of Dublin. In politics he was a liberal, contributed to the old Nation newspaper, and replied there in 1872–4 to James Anthony Froude's lectures in America on Irish history. He authored numerous pamphlets. He opposed Home Rule, and from 1878 he was an opponent of Charles Stewart Parnell.

== Legacy ==
Prendergast's manuscript collections were bequeathed to the King's Inn, Dublin.

== Family ==
Prendergast married, on 1 September 1838, Caroline, second daughter of the radical political pamphleteer and freethinker George Ensor of Ardress House, County Armagh, and left one son, Francis, who settled in California and became a naturalised American.
