= Carte Manuscripts =

The Carte Manuscripts are archived historical papers collected by Thomas Carte (1686–1754). They are held in the Bodleian Library, at the University of Oxford, England.

Among Carte's collection were many documents relating to the history of Ireland. Thomas Carte gave a first tranche of Irish papers to the Bodleian in 1753.

Carte's papers were arranged for binding in 276 volumes in 1862, and in 1871 Charles William Russell and John Patrick Prendergast edited the eight-volume Report on the Carte Manuscripts in the Bodleian Library.

A catalogue of the Carte Papers is available via the Online Catalogues of Western Manuscripts at the Bodleian Library. A handwritten calendar of the Carte Papers, produced between 1878 and 1883, is available in the Library. The 1660-1687 section of the Carte Calendar is published online.

== See also ==
- Manuscript
