= Barbara Verschoyle =

Land agent and philanthropist

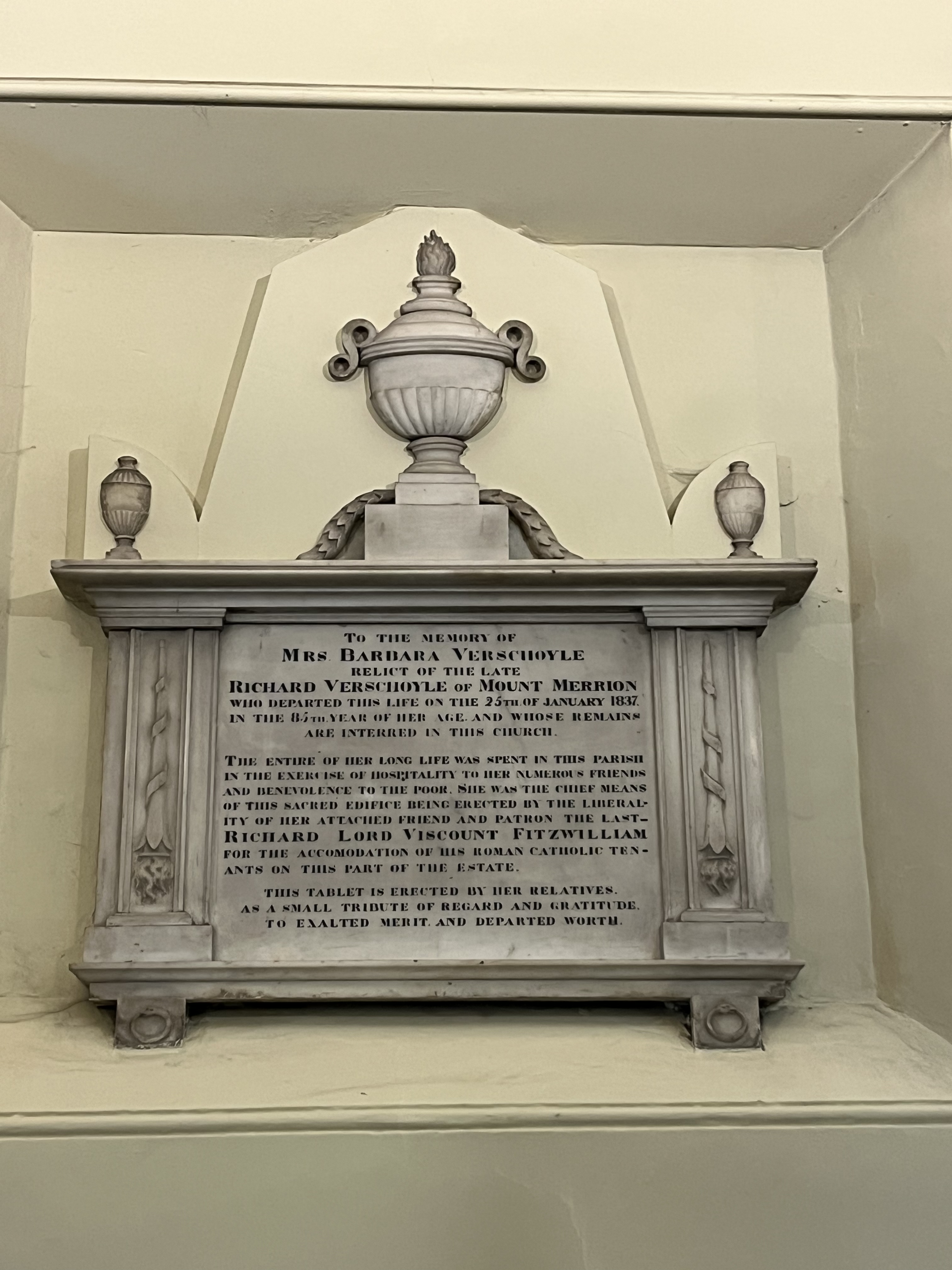
- A memorial to Barbara Fagan Verschoyle in Booterstown church
- Born: Barbara Fagan c. 1750-1753; Dublin, Ireland
- Died: 25 January 1837; Dublin, Ireland
- Resting place: Church of the Assumption, Booterstown
- Known for: Land agent and philanthropist

Barbara Fagan Verschoyle (died 25 January 1837), was a land agent and philanthropist in Dublin.

== Early life ==
Born Barbara Fagan in the early 1750s to Bryan and Elizabeth Fagan in Dublin, Verschoyle was the sixth daughter of eight in the family. Her father was a land agent for the FitzWilliam estate in Dublin and brewer for the brewery on Usher's Island in Dublin.

When her father died in 1761, her mother continued running both businesses until her own death in October 1789.

The FitzWilliam estate at this time was undergoing significant development in the Merrion street and surrounding area.

In 1750, there were believed to be about 35 breweries in the city.

== Family ==
Barbara Fagan took over the family business at some point after her mother died, certainly by 1796. The Catholic Fagan married a Protestant merchant, Richard Verschoyle of the Verschoyle family.

Her husband was born in Donore, County Meath in 1751 to Joseph and Margaret (Mottley) Verschoyle. His paternal lineage was Huguenot. He died in 1827 in Brighton, Sussex, England.

The couple had no children and Verschoyle remained working for the FitzWilliam estate until her husband's death in 1827. The couple lived in Mount Merrion House on the estate in Dublin.

== Career ==
She worked very closely with Richard FitzWilliam, 7th Viscount FitzWilliam of Merrion and managed a significant and valuable estate. In 1816, the estate was estimated to be worth £14,000 per year and over 1,275 acres in size. Typical work for an agent included the negotiation of leases, selection of new tenants, collecting rents from existing tenants and ensuring the franchise rights of freeholders. This made the role an inherently political one considering the changes the country was undergoing during the late 1700s.

The passing of the 1793 relief act and the uncertain economic conditions. The 1798 rebellion made rents particularly difficult to collect. Though Verschoyle had some ideas on how to adjust the leases to reduce periods when rent was almost impossible to collect, the rebellion and the Acts of Union 1800 made the situation even more difficult.

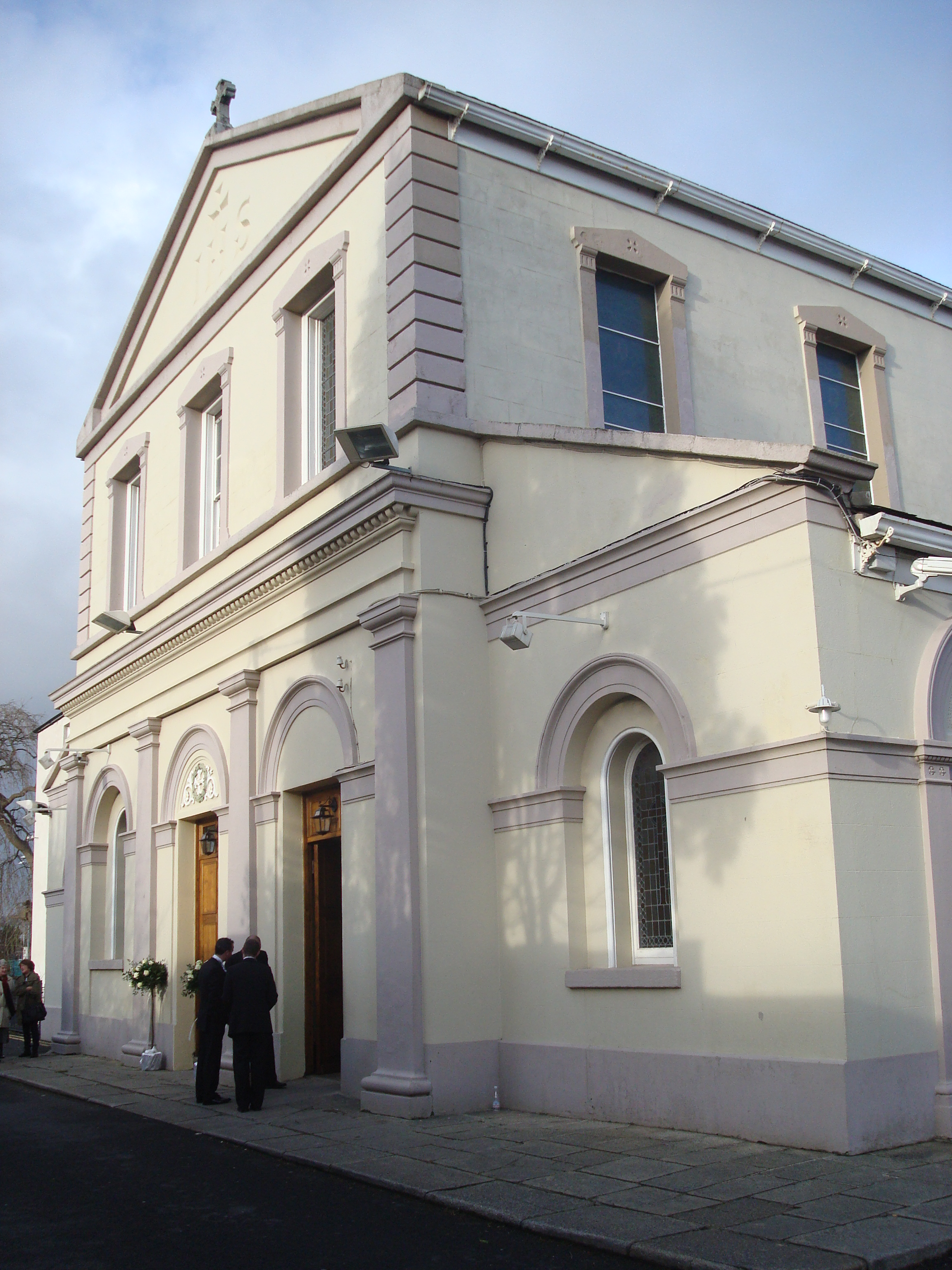
Church of the Assumption Booterstown

With the loss of the Parliament in Dublin in 1801 there were economic difficulties in the city. However, the estate value continued to rise. Verschoyle was able to convince FitzWilliam to donate land for a church in Booterstown and the 1812 Italianate church was erected and paid for by Viscount FitzWilliam. Verschoyle also oversaw the transformation of adjoining land into a girls school and she donated personal funds to assist in the running of it each year. In 1826, she oversaw the construction of the parish school. In 1816, FitzWilliam died and the estate passed to his heir, George Herbert, 11th Earl of Pembroke. Verschoyle continued in her role as agent until her husband died. At that point, she retired.

== Legacy ==
Once retired Verschoyle focused on her charities. She worked to establish a new convent using money bequeathed to her by Fitzwilliam to build a convent school and gave more from her own funds to pay for the school chaplain. She was patron of the school and invited the Sisters of Charity to run it. They were in Stanhope street in Dublin and they took over the school in Sandymount in 1831.

Verschoyle died in Dublin on 25 January 1837. There is a small memorial to her in the church recording her role in its erection.
