= Church of the Assumption, Booterstown =

Church in County Dublin, Ireland

Church of the Assumption
- Church of the Assumption, Booterstown
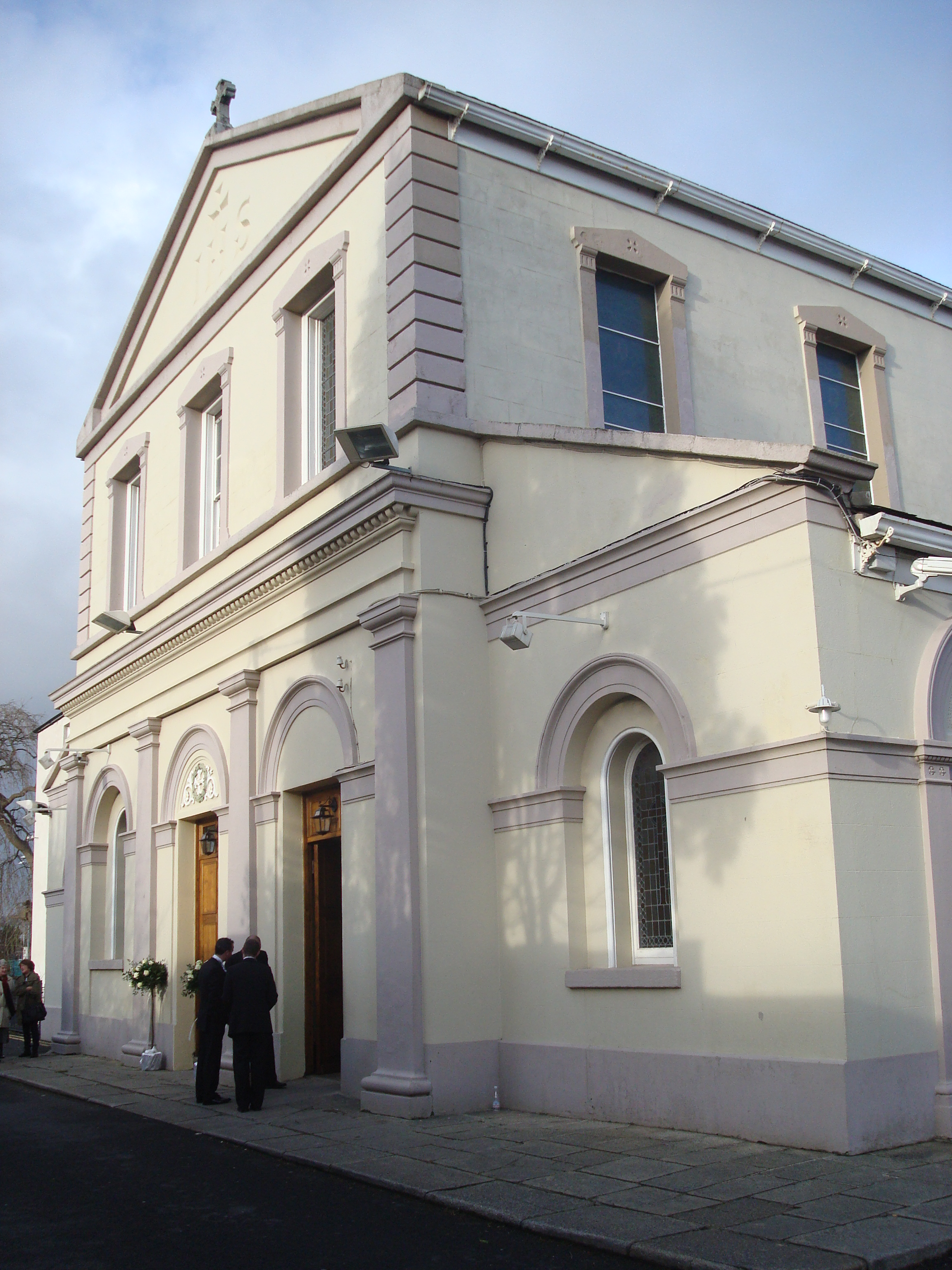
- Church of the Assumption
- 53.305404°N 6.198457°W
- Location: Booterstown; County Dublin
- Country: Ireland
- Denomination: Roman Catholic
- Website: booterstownparish.ie

History
- Founded: 1813
- Dedication: Feast of the Assumption
- Dedicated: 15 August 1813

Administration
- Archdiocese: Dublin
- Deanery: Dun Laoghaire
- Parish: Booterstown

Church of the Assumption, Booterstown is a Roman Catholic church located in Booterstown, County Dublin, Ireland. The church represents the Parish of the Assumption Booterstown, which was established in 1616. The present church opened in 1813 and was built as a replacement for the old chapel that existed at the site. The construction was paid for by Richard FitzWilliam, 7th Viscount FitzWilliam who provided it for his Roman Catholic tenants.

== History ==
=== Parish Boundary ===
The Booterstown parish was established in 1616 and its boundary was from Irishtown, through Donnybrook, Milltown, Churchtown, Rathfarnham to the top of Three Rock Mountain through Sandyford to Seapoint taking in Dundrum, Stillorgan and Galloping Green. Other parishes were formed directly or indirectly from the Booterstown parish such as Donnybrook in 1747, Dundrum in 1879, Blackrock in 1922, Mount Merrion in 1948, Merrion Road in 1964 and Newtownpark in 1967.

=== The Church ===
Construction of the present parish church started on 6 August 1812 with the laying of the foundation stone. The church was constructed at the expense of the Richard FitzWilliam, 7th Viscount FitzWilliam. He instructed the architect to make the church look like a house and avoid making it look like a church. This was to avoid upsetting his local Protestant tenants and friends. The church was dedicated to the Feast of the Assumption on 15 August 1813, by Dr. John Troy, Archbishop of Dublin.

In 1872, a new presbytery for Monsignor Forde and school for the Sisters of Mercy were built at a cost of £4,400.

== Gallery ==
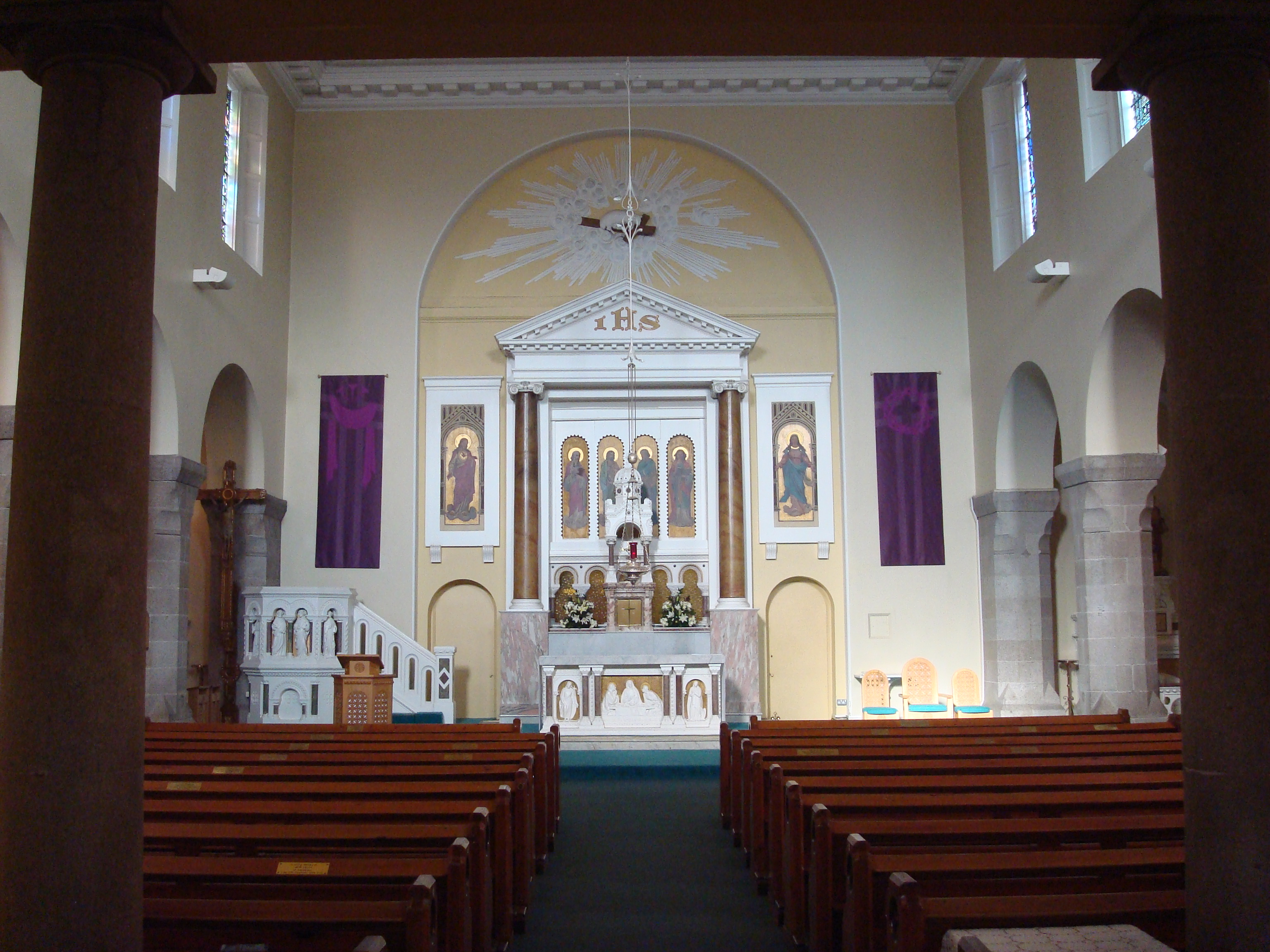
Inside the Church of the Assumption

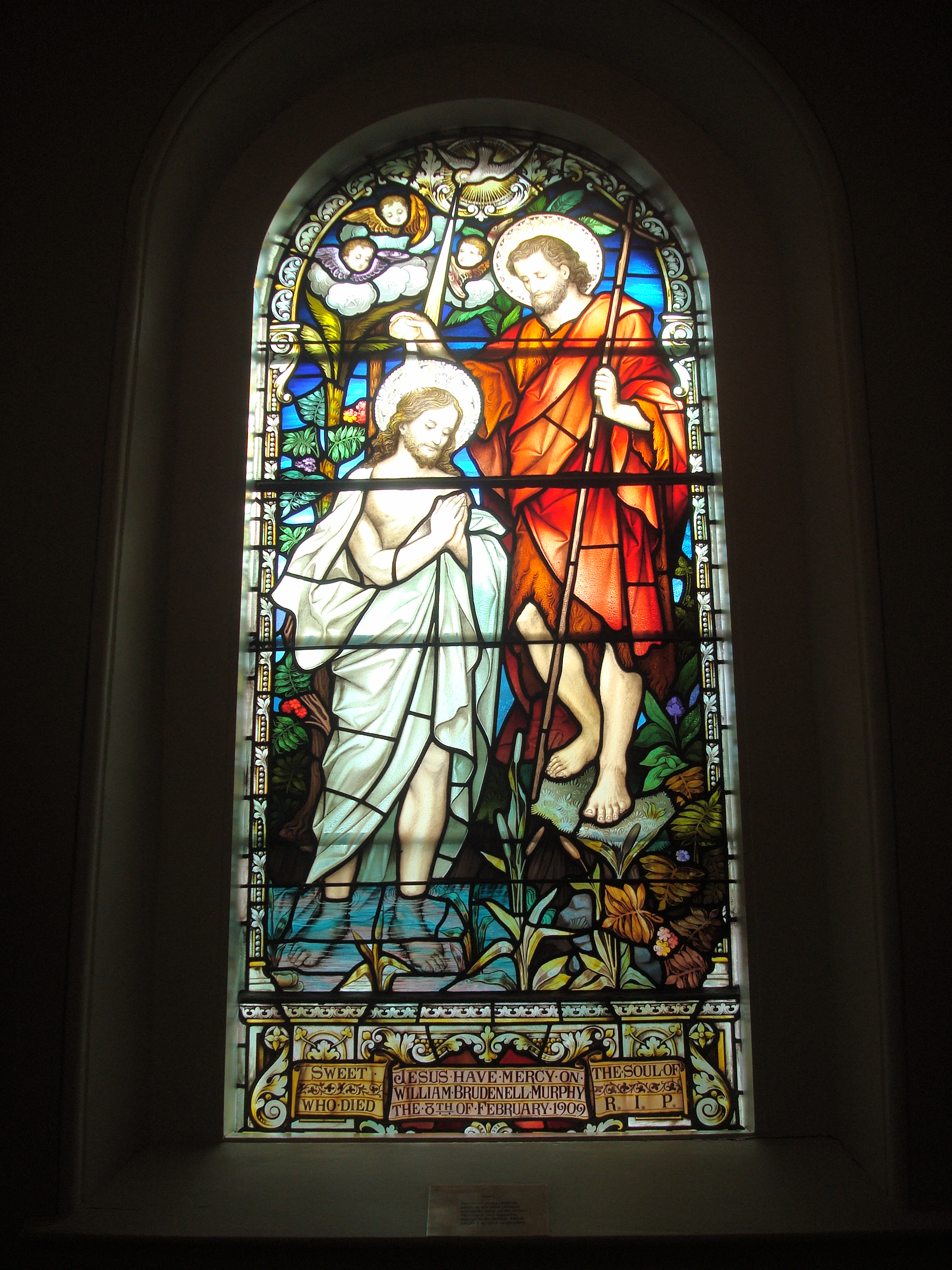
Stained Glass

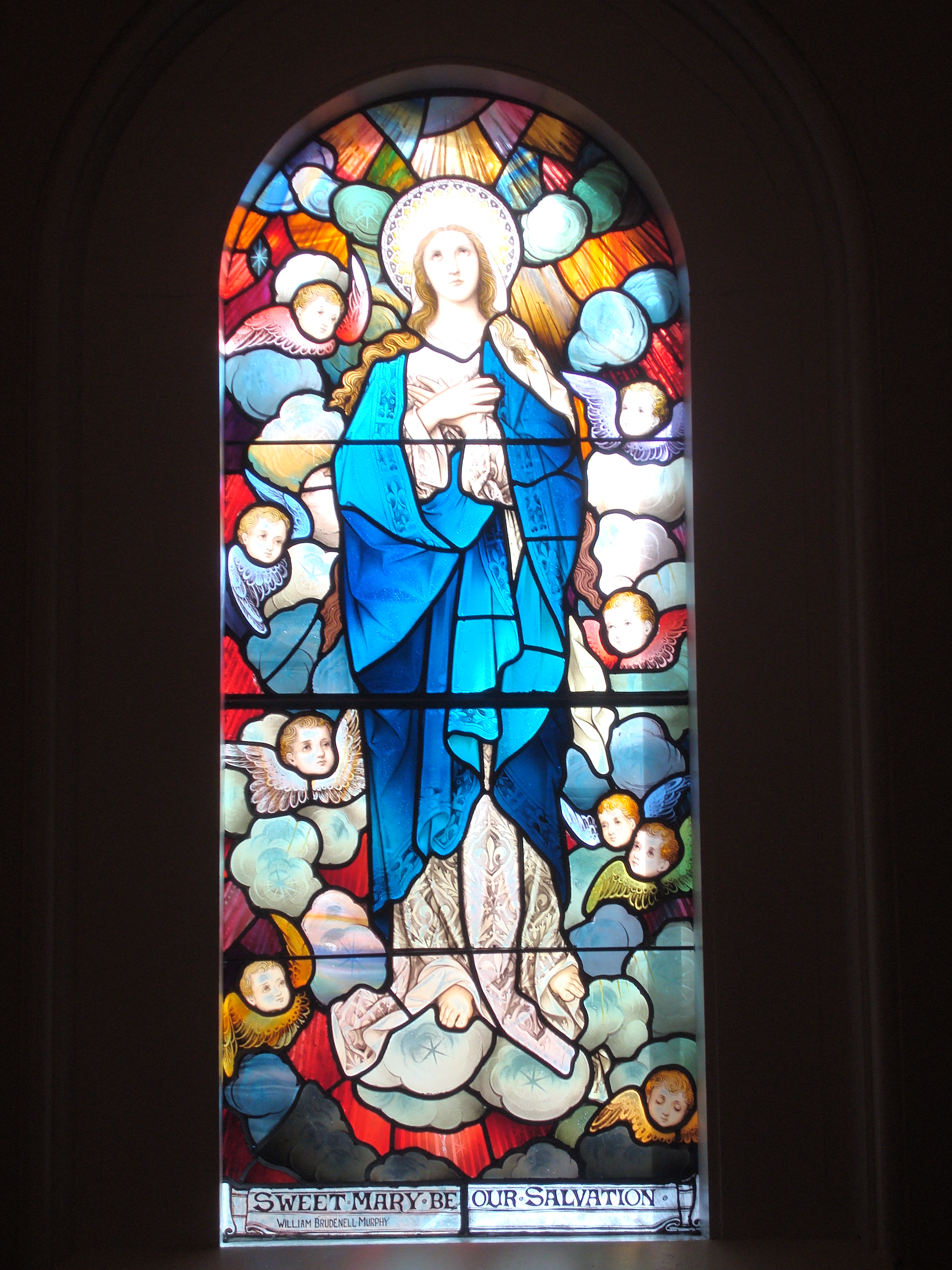
Stained Glass

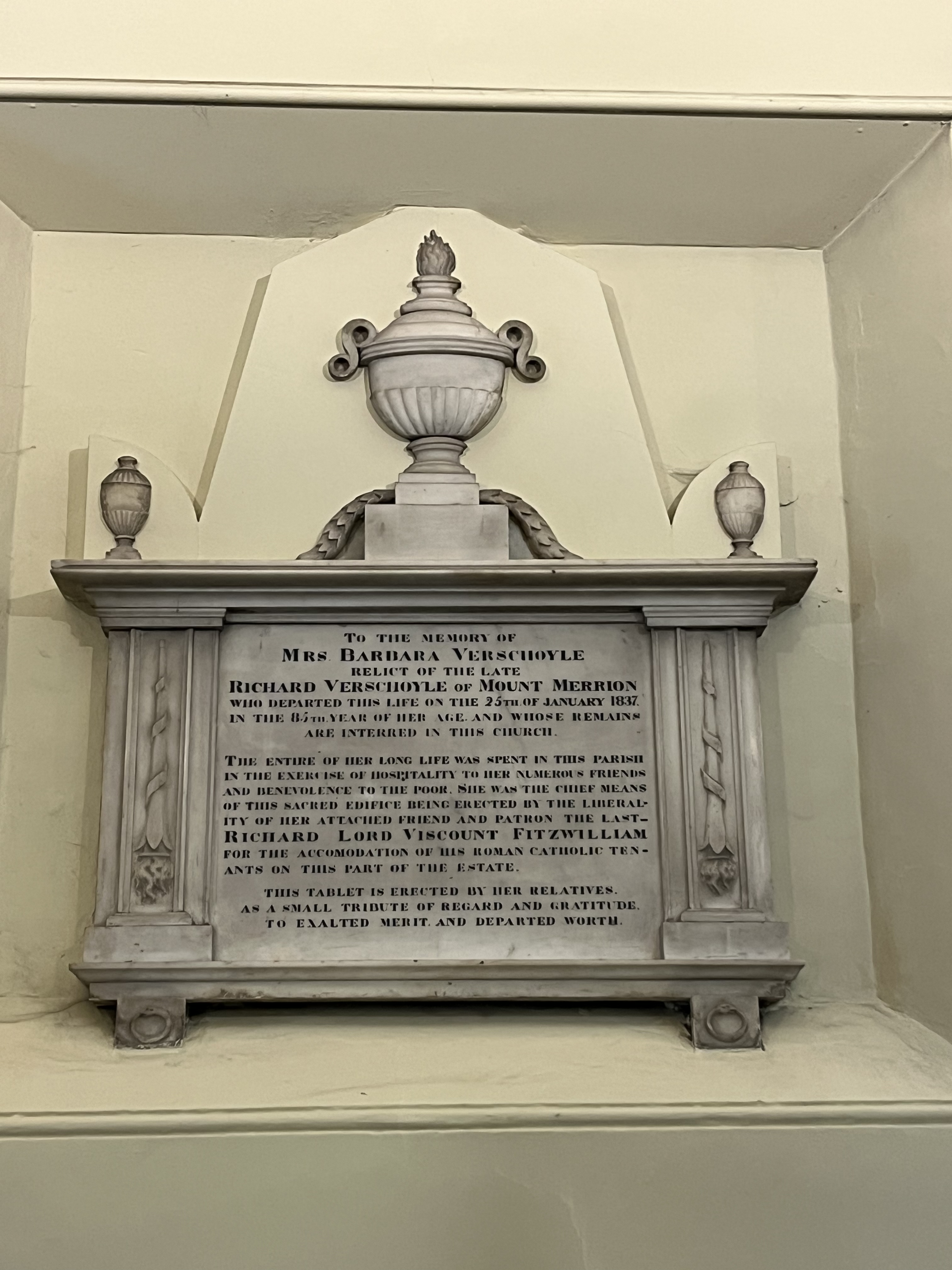
Plaque in the Church to Barbara Fagan Verschoyle

== See also ==
- Roman Catholic Archdiocese of Dublin
