= Charles Haliday =

Irish public health reformer, historian and antiquary

Charles Haliday (1789–1866) was an Irish public health reformer, historian and antiquary who made significant contributions to the study of the history of Dublin, being particularly interested in the Scandinavian antiquities of the city.

== Early life and family ==
Charles Halliday was born in Carrick-on-Suir in County Tipperary in 1789. His father was an apothecary, William Halliday. He was the second of four sons. From 1809 to 1812, Haliday worked in London as a clerk in Lubbock's Bank, and later working as a commission agent for John Norcot D'Esterre. Haliday returned to Dublin after the death of his elder brother, William, and took over the business William had been running on behalf of his father-in-law, Finlay Alder, trading in timber and bark on Arran Quay. From around 1825, he started to spell his name Haliday. Haliday married Mary Hayes of Mountmellick.

== Career ==
In 1832, when cholera first appeared in Dublin, he became a campaigner for improved living conditions among the city's poor, a role he was to play for the remainder of his life. This work focused on the provision of main drainage and clean drinking water for the working class of Dublin. During the construction of the railway along the coast of Dublin, Haliday ensured that access was maintained to a bathing area at Dun Laoghaire. During the construction of the new railway station, now Connolly Station, Haliday gave evidence on the protection of the view the Custom House from Westmoreland Street which impacted on the construction of a viaduct across the street.

He was elected a Member of the Ballast Board in 1833, a corporation for improving Dublin harbour and superintending the lighthouses on the Irish coast. He also served for many years as consul for Greece, honorary secretary of the Chamber of Commerce in Dublin, and a director of the Bank of Ireland.

== Antiquarian work and residence ==
In 1847 he was elected a member of the Royal Irish Academy (RIA). In 1850 he began to research the history of the port of Dublin on behalf of the Ballast Board. It was this work which led him to undertake a detailed study of the city's Scandinavian history, a period that had hitherto been almost entirely neglected by scholars.

In 1834 Haliday moved to Monkstown, Dublin. In 1843 he bought Monkstown Park, previously the residence of Lord Ranelagh, which he demolished and rebuilt. His new house had a large library to house his growing collection of books, pamphlets and tracts on Irish history. Haliday was an avid collector of antiquities and compiled one of the largest private collections of Irish historical works. At his death his library comprised 25,000 to 35,000 pamphlets relating to Ireland, in addition to innumerable books, tracts, ballads, and broadsides, including a secret service money book which detailed payments to informers during the 1798 Rebellion and was later used by R. R. Madden.

== Death and legacy ==
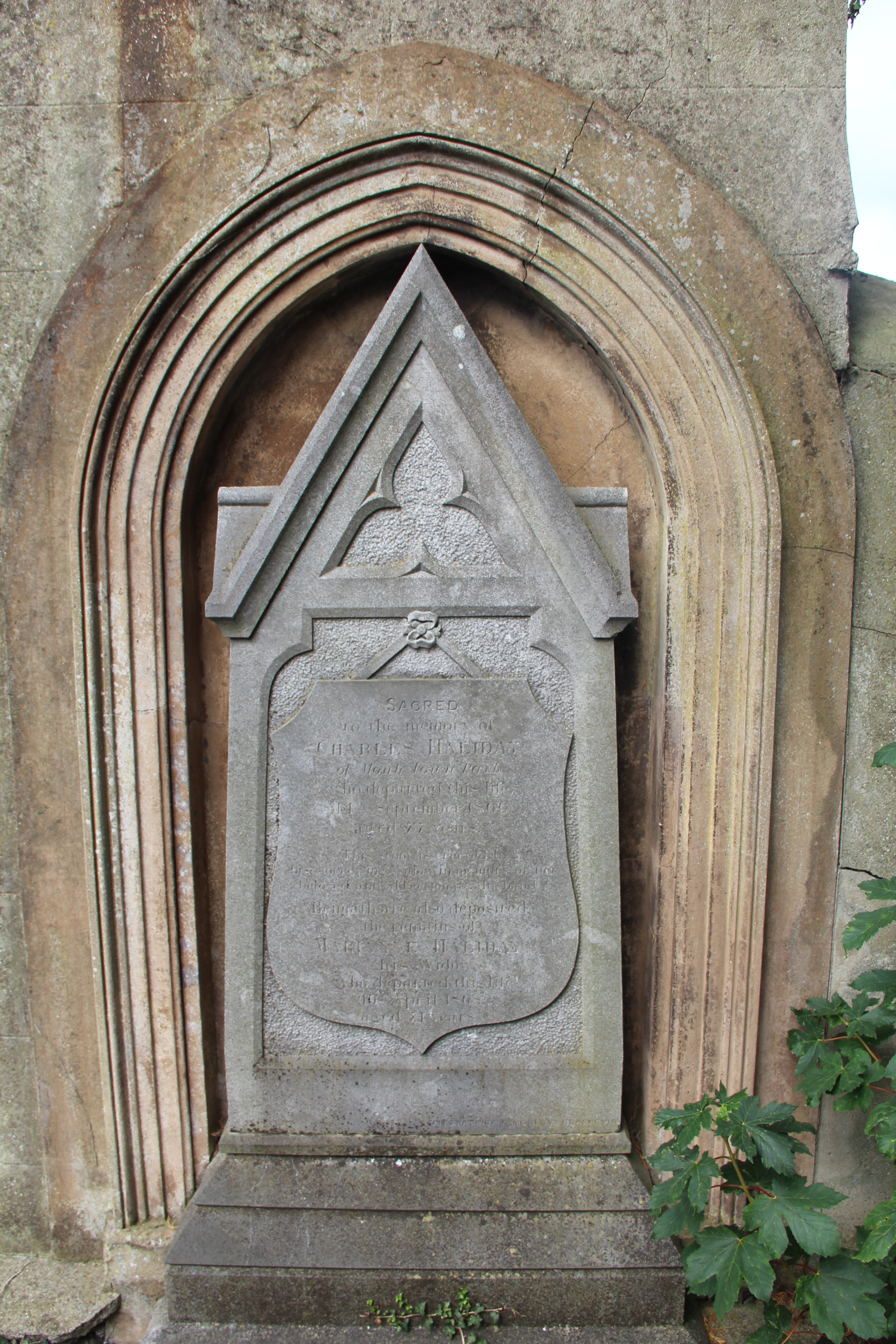
Tombstone of Charles Haliday, Carrickbrennan cemetery, Monkstown, Dublin

Haliday died at Monkstown Park on 14 September 1866. He is buried nearby in Carrickbrennan Churchyard. His work on the early history of Dublin, The Scandinavian Kingdom of Dublin, was published posthumously in 1881 edited by John P. Prendergast. His vast collection of antiquities was inherited by his widow, who presented it to the RIA in 1867. 3000 duplicates from his collection were transferred to the National Library of Ireland. The RIA hold a portrait of Haliday by Stephen Catterson Smith.

His estate at Monkstown Park has since been used as an education premises. Corrig School (Monkstown Park School) operated there from the 1880s until the early 1920s. Since 1950 it has operated as the location for CBC Monkstown.
