= Monkstown, Dublin =

Suburb of Dublin, Ireland

Monkstown Baile na Manach (Irish)
- Suburb
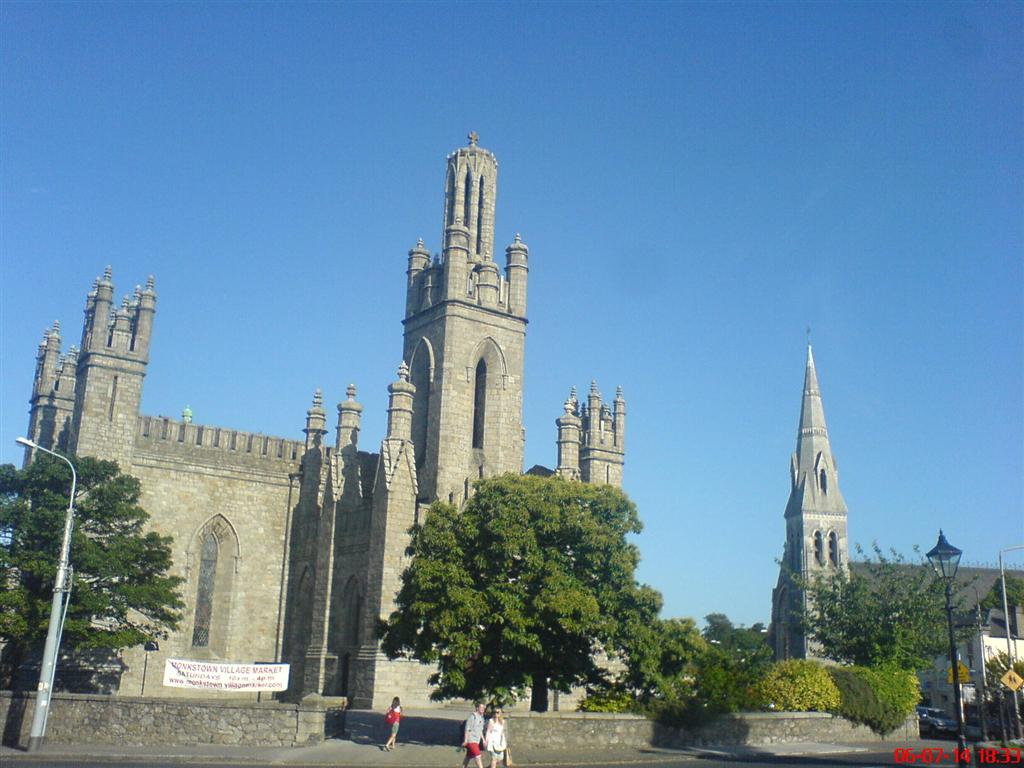
- Monkstown showing to the left Monkstown Church, Dublin (Church of Ireland) and St. Patricks Church (Roman Catholic) to the right

- Location in Dublin Monkstown (Ireland)
- Coordinates: 53°17′38″N 6°09′13″W
- Country: Ireland
- Province: Leinster
- County: County Dublin
- Local government area: Dún Laoghaire–Rathdown

Government
  - Dáil constituency: Dún Laoghaire
  - EU Parliament: Dublin

Population (2006)
  - Urban: 6,369
- Time zone: UTC±0 (WET)
  - Summer (DST): UTC+1 (IST)
- Eircode routing key: A94
- Area code: 01 (+3531)
- Irish Grid Reference: O221292

Monkstown (Irish: Baile na Manach), historically known as Carrickbrennan (Irish: Carraig Bhraonáin), is a suburb of Dublin, Ireland, approximately 10 km (6 mi) south-east of Dublin city centre. It is within the jurisdiction of Dún Laoghaire–Rathdown County Council. It is on the coast, between Blackrock and Dún Laoghaire while also bordering Sallynoggin and Deansgrange inland.

The lands of the Carrickbrennan estate form the greater part of the civil parish of Monkstown.

== History ==
A church was built at Carrickbrennan (as Monkstown was then known) before the 8th century, and dedicated to Saint Mochonna, bishop of Inispatrick or Holmpatrick by Skerries. The grange of Carrickbrennan, otherwise Monkstown, was granted by the King to the Cistercian monks of Saint Mary's Abbey, Dublin, in 1200. The monks built their grange near to the church, and the village grew up around it. The lands of which it was a part extended as far south as Bulloch harbour on the outskirts of Dalkey, where the monks constructed a fishing harbour protected by a castle.

In 1539, Henry VIII awarded the Monkstown lands to Sir John Travers, Master of the Ordnance in Ireland. John Travers lived in his Castle at Monkstown from 1557 to his death in 1562 (he is buried in the Carrickbrennan Graveyard) when the property fell to James Eustace 3rd Viscount Baltinglass through his marriage to Mary Travers. In 1580, the Castle was used as a rebellion stronghold, after which it was awarded to Sir Henry Wallop, Vice-Treasurer of Ireland. The lands were later returned to Mary, the widowed Lady Baltinglass, who later married Gerald Alymer. On her death in 1610, the Castle was transferred to the Chevers family through the marriage of Mary Travers's sister Catherine to John Chevers, and the property passed directly to his second son Henry Chevers, who married Catherine, daughter of Sir Richard Fitzwilliam. Henry and Catherine Chevers lived here with their four children (Walter, Thomas, Patrick, Margaret).

Upon the death of Henry in 1640, the castle and lands were passed to Walter Cheevers. Walter and family received a command to vacate Monkstown in 1653 by the Cromwellian Commissioners, and transplanted to Killyan, County Galway. In 1660, Walter Chevers was restored to his estate at Monkstown Castle until his death in 1678. His death occurred on 20 December 1678, and he was buried at Mountoun (Monkstown), two days later on the 22nd.

Monkstown was later purchased by the Archbishop of Armagh, Michael Boyle, and his son Murrough Boyle, 1st Viscount Blesington enlarged the castle, making it one of the finest residences.

Until about 1800, Monkstown was a rural area of open countryside, dotted with large houses owned by the merchants of Dublin. The Monkstown Church (Church of Ireland) had been built – but was smaller than the present church.

The two small local rivers met in the area now called Pakenham Road. The river known as Micky Briens originated in Sallynoggin. A lake beside Monkstown Castle had one small island. The coastline was ragged and rocky, with a harbour stretching over 100 yards inland at the mouth of the aforementioned rivers, adjacent to the area now occupied by the West Pier. Dún Laoghaire (then called Dunleary, and later Kingstown) was then a small group of houses in the area of the Purty Kitchen, and the present area of Dún Laoghaire was an area of rocky outcrops and, later, quarries.

The night of 18 November 1807 was one of disasters in south Dublin. In a horrific storm, two sailing ships, the Rochdale and the Prince of Wales, were blown onto the rocks, one at Seapoint and the other at Blackrock. About 400 lives in total were lost on that night, many of them washed up on the shore at Monkstown. The disaster was one of the factors which led to the building of Dún Laoghaire Harbour. Most of the victims were buried in Carrickbrennan Churchyard.

The building of Dún Laoghaire harbour gave impetus to the area, and Montpelier Parade was the first of many terraces built in the area. The coming of the railway in 1837 changed the topology of the coast and led to Monkstown becoming a commuter suburb of the city of Dublin. Most of the houses along Monkstown Road and the avenues north of that road were constructed over the next 30 years. The maps of 1870 show this phase completed, but the rest of Monkstown consists of mansions surrounded by extensive gardens.

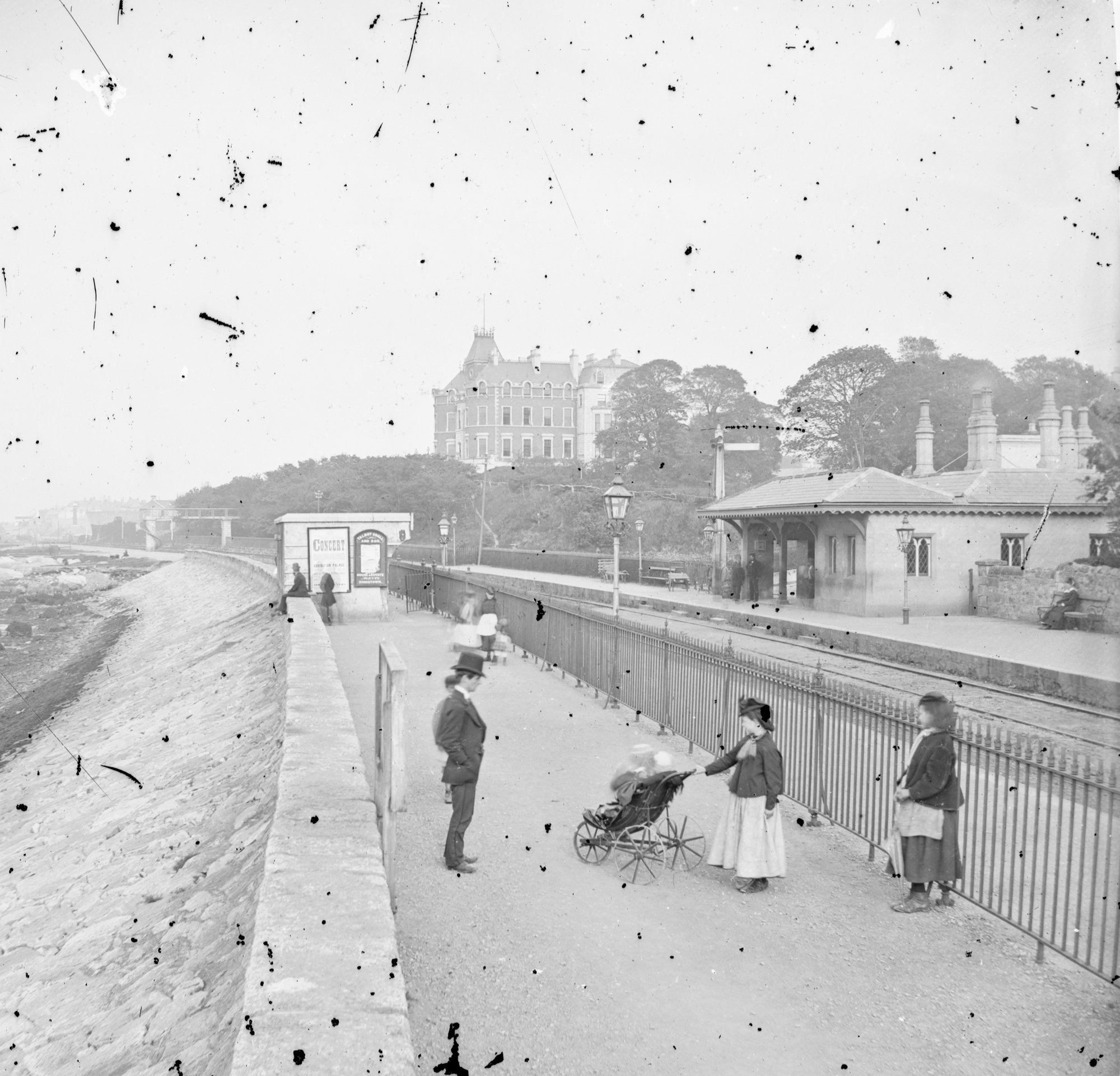
Salthill and Monkstown railway station originally built by the Dublin and Kingstown Railway.

For the following 50 years there was little change. The post-war developments of Castle Park, Richmond, Windsor, etc. and the more recent developments of Brook Court, Monkstown Valley, and Carrickbrennan Lawn mean that there is little opportunity for further development.

The diaries of the Rev. John Thomas Hynes (1799–1868), a Catholic bishop who retired to Monkstown in 1861–68, provide a valuable insight into daily life in Monkstown in that period. Hynes lived at Bloomwood, Monkstown Avenue (later renamed Carrickbrennan Road), and later moved to Uplands, The Hill, Monkstown. The Hynes Diaries recount such details as the coming of gas lighting, the postal and travel facilities, church affairs, and lots of local gossip. The Hynes diaries are now preserved in Melbourne, but the full text has been made available online.

=== Documentary references ===
- Monkstown is first mentioned in 1450; Tenants Cistercians at Carrickbrennan, Villa Monachorum.
- Carrickbrennan, or "Carigbrenna", features on the 1598 map "A Modern Depiction of Ireland, One of the British Isles" by Abraham Ortelius.
- Records of the Abbey of the Blessed Virgin Mary 1640.
- Forfeiting Proprietors under the Cromwellian Settlement 1657.
- In James Joyce's "The Dead", Gabriel Conroy and his wife Gretta live in Monkstown.

== Built heritage ==
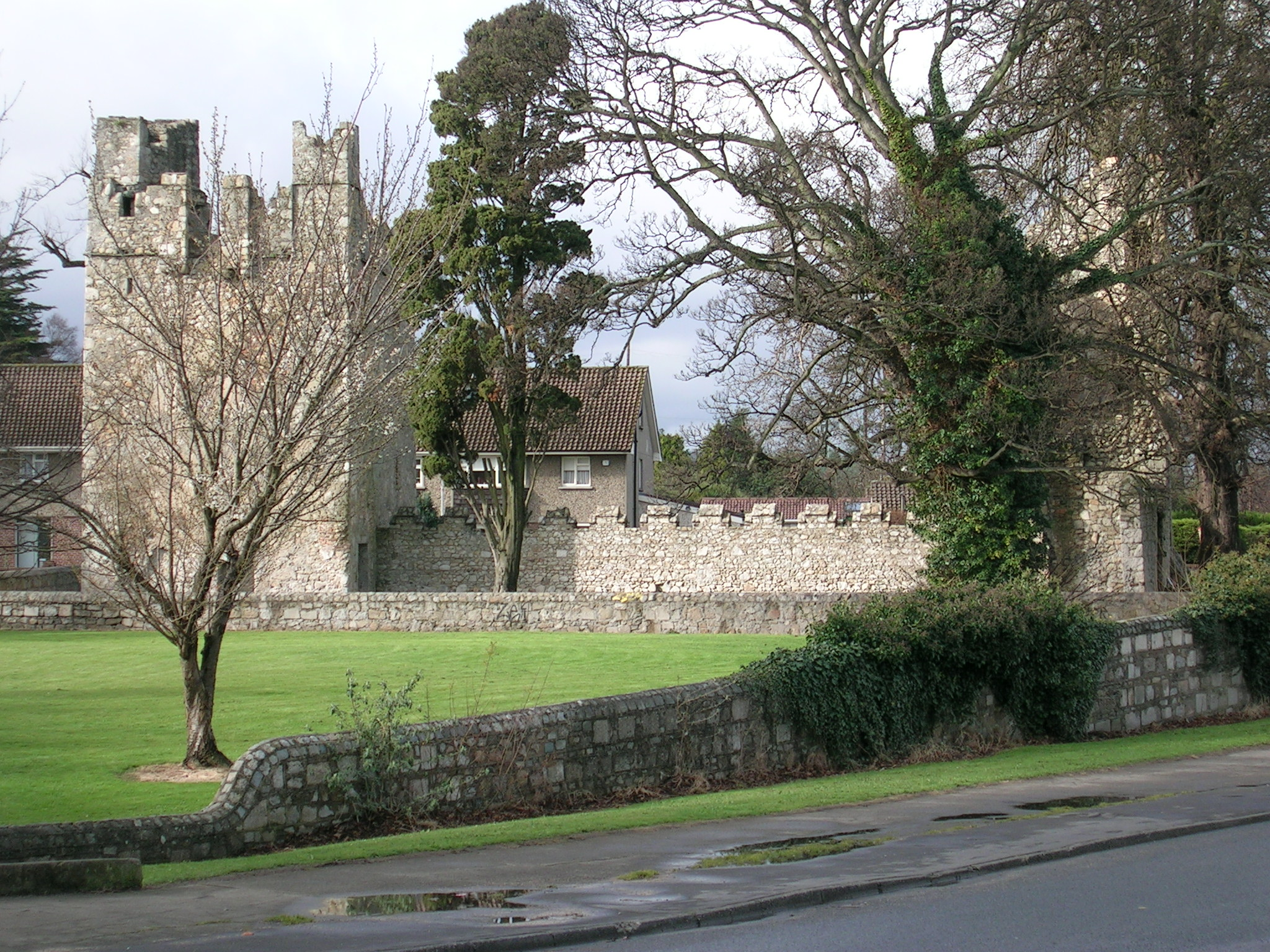
Monkstown Castle, viewed from the east

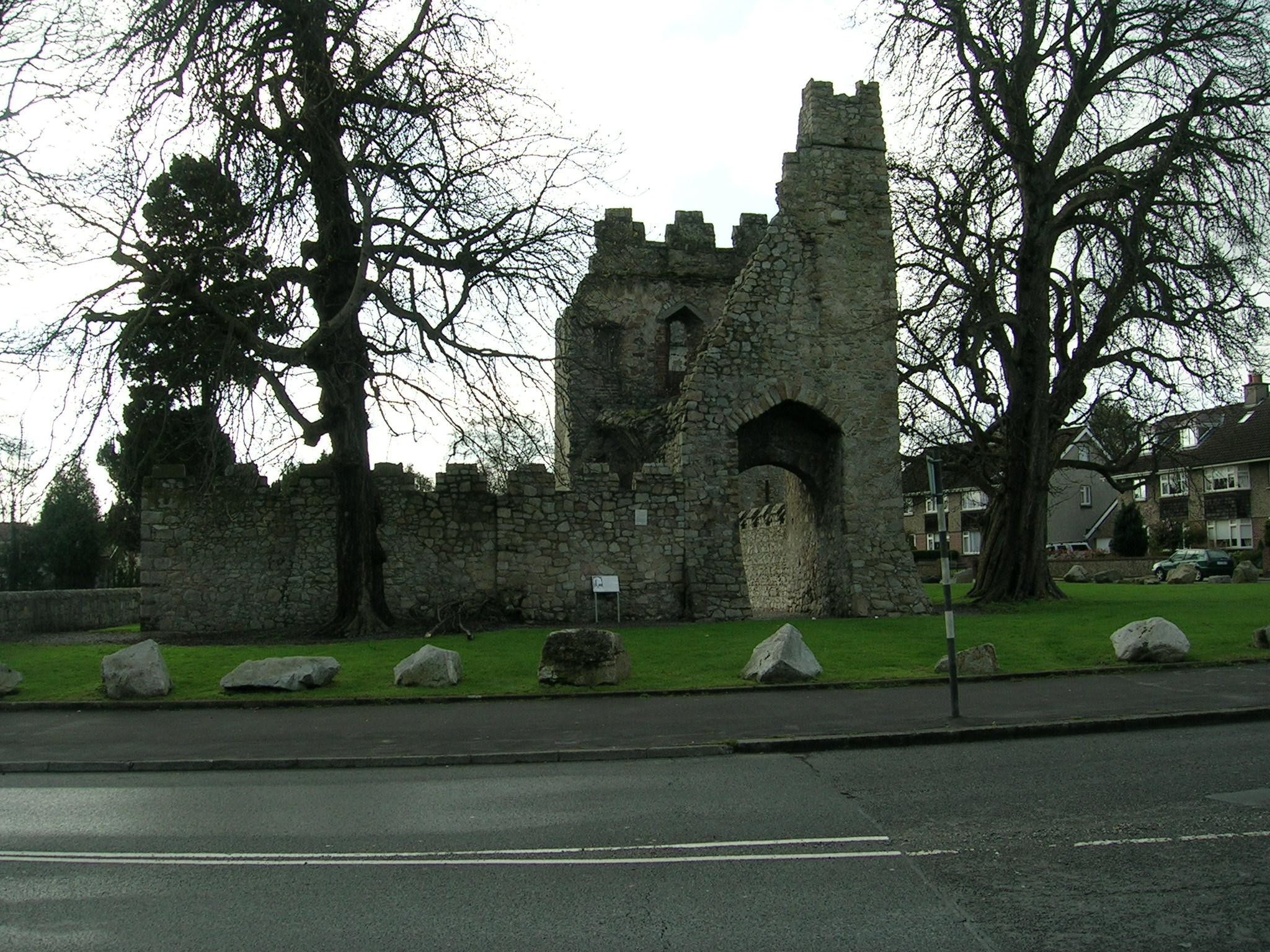
Monkstown Castle, viewed from the north

Monkstown has two old established churches, Saint Mary's Church of Ireland (1831) and Saint Patrick's Catholic Church (1866), both on Carrickbrennan Road. Saint John's Church, located at Gamble's Hill, was originally constructed as a Church of Ireland Church in the 1860s but was renovated and re-consecrated by the Society of Saint Pius X after 1985. Buildings of other religious denominations include the Kingdom Hall of the Jehovah's Witnesses at Monkstown Farm, and the Meeting Hall of the Society of Friends at the junction of Pakenham Road and Carrickbrennan Road. There is also the Friends Burial Ground (Quaker) located at Temple Hill just off Monkstown Road.

Monkstown Castle, which was probably built in the 12th or 13th century, was erected by the monks of the abbey of the Virgin Mary, near Dublin.

Monkstown is also noted for its coastline, which is home to a number of historical buildings of the Victorian, Georgian and Edwardian periods. One of the most notable buildings of the Salthill and Monkstown area is the Martello Tower, located at Seapoint beach.

== Transport ==
The DART stations of Salthill and Monkstown and Seapoint serve the area.

Dublin Bus serves the area with routes 7, 7a, 7n, S8 and 63.

An Aircoach service starting in Dalkey links the area with Dublin Airport 24 hours a day.

== Sports ==
Monkstown Lawn Tennis Club was founded in 1877. It was the first tennis club in Ireland.

Monkstown Football Club was founded in the village in 1883 before moving to Sandymount in 1901.

Monkstown (Dublin) Boxing Club was founded in 2004. Their gym is situated in the newly built Mounttown Community Centre in Fitzgerald Park, in the Monkstown Farm Area.

Farm Utd Football Club was formed in 1935 and uses part of the Monkstown Community Centre as its dressing rooms.

Monkstown also has a Brazilian jiu-jitsu club, Ribeiro Jiu Jitsu Ireland. Their gym is situated in the Mounttown Industrial Estate.

A hockey club, Monkstown Hockey Club, is based in the Rathdown School.

== Culture ==
Comhaltas Ceoltóirí Éireann, an organisation promoting Irish culture (particularly Irish traditional music), has its headquarters in Monkstown, as does BirdWatch Ireland.

Monkstown had for decades a puppet theatre, the Lambert Puppet Theatre, a family-run business, which for many years hosted an international puppet festival. It also used to appear on national television for RTÉ. It closed some time after a fire.

There are several references to Monkstown and its wealthy residents in the Ross O'Carroll Kelly series.

== Education ==
A multi-denominational primary school, Monkstown Educate Together National School (METNS), a fee-paying junior and senior school Monkstown Park Junior School and CBC Monkstown Park, and Holy Family National School are located in the Monkstown area. A Gaelscoil is also located in Monkstown, Scoil Lorcáin, teaching all classes through Irish.

St. Oliver Plunkett N.S. is a school for children with a Specific Learning Difficulty (SLD). This school caters for children from a wide catchment area.

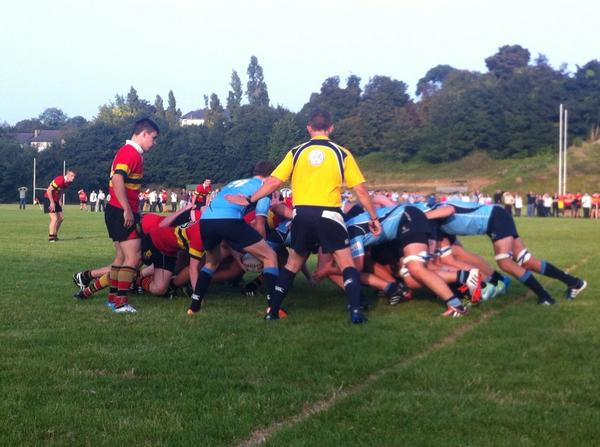
A rugby match at CBC Monkstown Park

Christian Brother's College is based on the old estate of Charles Haliday at Monkstown Park. It consists of two schools: an Independent preparatory school with 200 students and a fee-paying secondary school with more than 500 students. CBC caters for boys from junior infants through the sixth year. The college recently completed a major development which saw existing buildings upgraded and a new extension built.

== Representation ==
Monkstown is part of the Dáil Éireann constituency of Dún Laoghaire.

== People ==
- D. J. Carey, hurler
- Nuala Carey, weather presenter
- Tim Pat Coogan, writer
- Cathy Davey, Irish singer-songwriter grew up in Monkstown
- Chris de Burgh, singer-songwriter
- Helen Dillon (b.1940), gardener who moved from Ranelagh in 2016
- The Edge, guitarist of U2
- Howard Grubb (1844–31) was a designer and maker of telescopes. He lived at De Vesci Terrace, and from 1925, at 13 Longford Terrace, which now bears a plaque.
- Alfred Gresham Jones (1824?–1913), Irish architect. He lived at Queen's Park House, at Clifton Lodge on Seafield Ave, at Villa Carlotta on Queen's Park, and then emigrated to Australia.
- Marian Keyes, Irish author and radio presenter, spent some of her upbringing in the suburb
- Paul McGuinness, manager of U2
- Charles Mitchel, first RTÉ television newsreader
- Christy Moore, singer-songwriter
- Cillian Murphy, actor
- Bláthnaid Ní Chofaigh, TV presenter
- Sinéad O'Connor, singer-songwriter
- Peadar O'Donnell (1893–1986), Irish socialist republican revolutionary
- John O'Shea, humanitarian
- William Parsons, 3rd Earl of Rosse (1800–64) lived at 1 Eaton Place, and built the world's largest telescope in 1845, which remained the world's largest for the rest of the century.
- Richard Pigott (1835–1889) lived at 7 De Vesci Terrace. He was an Irish journalist, best known for selling the Pigott forgeries.
- Ryan Tubridy, presenter of The Late Late Show
- Anthony Upton (1656–1718), judge of the Court of Common Pleas (Ireland), lived at Mountown House, in present-day Monkstown.
- Eve Watkinson (1909–1999), stage, film and television actress

== See also ==
- List of towns and villages in Ireland
