= Charles William Russell =

Irish Roman Catholic clergyman and scholar

- Born: 14 May 1812; Killough, Ireland
- Died: 26 February 1880 (aged 67); Dublin, Ireland
- Occupations: Writer, clergyman
- Writing career
- Genre: Biographer
- Notable work: Life of Cardinal Mezzofanti

Charles William Russell (14 May 1812 – 26 February 1880) was an Irish Roman Catholic clergyman from the Roman Catholic Diocese of Down and Connor and scholar.

== Early life ==
He was born at Killough, County Down, Ireland, a descendant of the Russells who held the Barony of Killough of Quoniamstown and Ballystrew.

He received his early education at Drogheda grammar school (where his mother hailed from) and at Downpatrick, after which he entered St Patrick's College, Maynooth in 1826. (St. Patrick's College is now formally the Pontifical University and National Seminary of Ireland, but is better known simply as Maynooth College. As such, it shares a campus and works in close cooperation with the National University of Ireland, Maynooth.) He was ordained on 13 June 1835, and became a professor of humanities.

== Works and ecclesiastical career ==
In 1842 he was chosen by Pope Gregory XVI to be the first Vicar Apostolic of Ceylon (now Sri Lanka), but he refused the dignity as also the Bishopric of Down and the Archbishopric of Armagh. Three years later he returned to Maynooth as professor of ecclesiastical history.

Having published his translation of Gottfried Wilhelm von Leibniz's System of Theology in 1850, he was occupied on his Life of Cardinal Mezzofanti which appeared in 1858. In 1857 he succeeded Laurence F. Renehan as President of St. Patrick's, Maynooth. Cardinal Nicholas Wiseman corresponded often with Russell, and when Wiseman visited Ireland in 1858, he paid a visit to Maynooth. In a memoir written later, Wiseman wrote "the professors and the students, over five hundred in number, in full academic costume, were in waiting with the college grounds, and accorded to their illustrious visitor a thoroughly Irish welcome". There are original letters from Cardinal Wiseman to Dr. Russell in the archives of St. Patrick's College, Maynooth.

In 1869, Russell's antiquarian learning caused him to be appointed a member of the Historical Manuscripts Commission and in that capacity he acted as joint editor (with John Patrick Prendergast) of the eight-volume Report on the Carte Manuscripts in the Bodleian Library (1871) and the Calendar of Irish State Papers during the reign of James I (4 vols., 1872–1877).

He was also a frequent contributor to the Dublin Review which for thirty years he enriched by various papers, often writing more than one for the same number. The last of these were the two masterly articles on the sonnet (1876–1877). He wrote many articles for Chambers's Encyclopaedia, and two - "Palimpsests" and "Papyrus" - for the Encyclopædia Britannica. He contributed other magazines, such as the Edinburgh Review, the Month, and the Irish Monthly. A popular work was his translation of Canon Schmid's Tales for the Young first published in 1846.

== Death ==
He died in Dublin, aged 67, from head injuries occasioned by a fall from his horse several years earlier and is buried in the College Cemetery which he had repaired and enhanced in his time as College President

In 1983 the distinguished ecclesiastical historian Dr. Ambrose MacAuley published his biography of Russell.

== Legacy ==
Cardinals Nicholas Wiseman - the first Archbishop of Westminster - and John Henry Newman alike counted him as an intimate friend, and the latter wrote of him: "He had perhaps more to do with my conversion than any one else". Dr. Russell lived to witness the early success of his nephew Charles Russell who in his uncle's lifetime was made a QC but who would subsequently become Lord Chief Justice of England.
