= Booterstown =

Suburb of Dublin, Ireland

Booterstown Baile an Bhóthair (Irish)
- Suburb
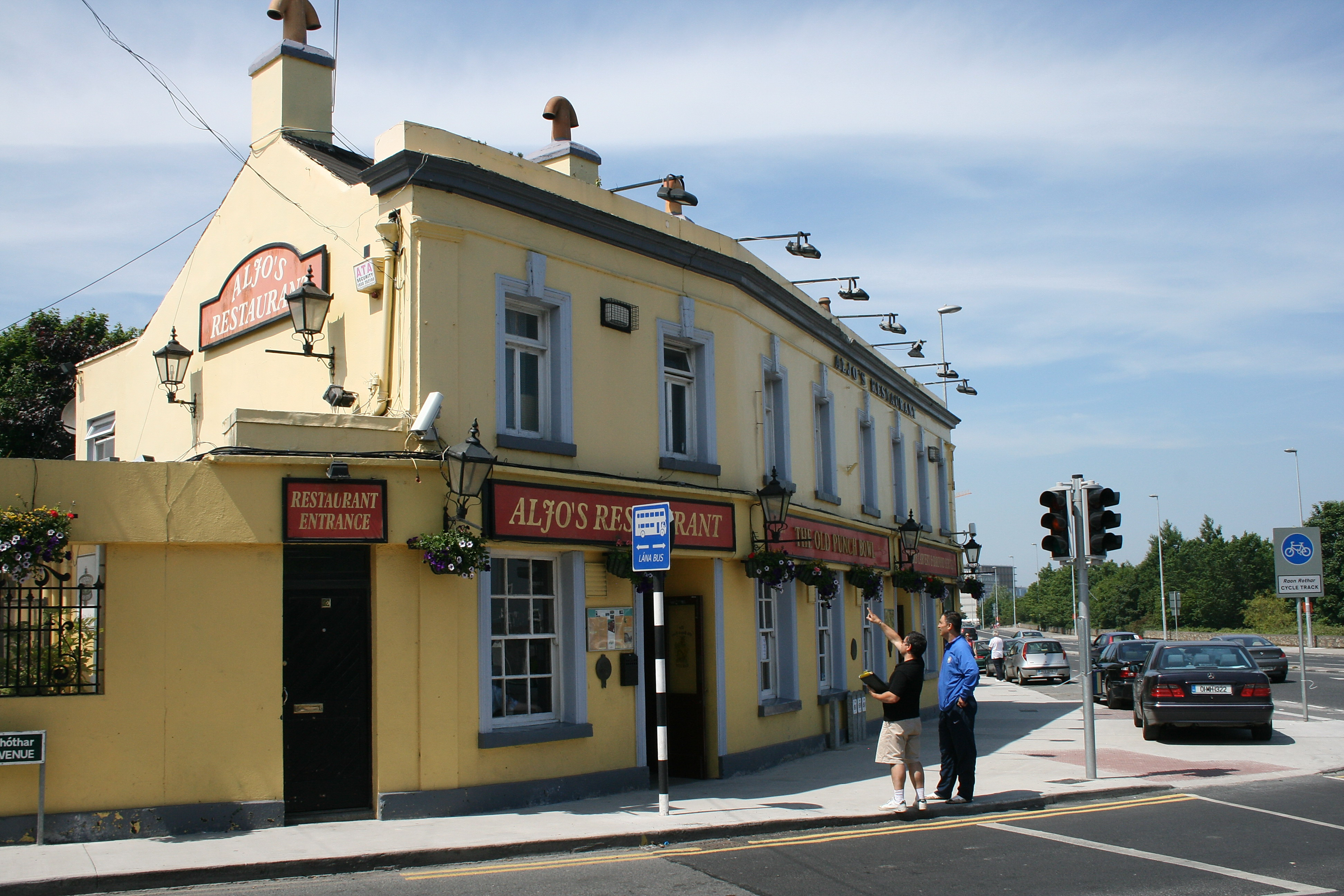
- The Punch Bowl in Booterstown

- Location in Ireland
- Coordinates: 53°18′31″N 6°11′47″W
- Country: Ireland
- Province: Leinster
- County: Dún Laoghaire–Rathdown

Government
  - Dáil Éireann: Dún Laoghaire

Population (2006)
  - Urban: 2,975
- Time zone: UTC+0 (WET)
  - Summer (DST): UTC-1 (IST (WEST))
- Eircode routing key: A94
- Area code: 01 (+3531)
- Irish Grid Reference: O201304

Booterstown (Irish: Baile an Bhóthair, meaning 'town of the road') is a coastal suburb of Dublin, Ireland. It is also a townland and civil parish in the modern county of Dún Laoghaire–Rathdown. It is situated about 7 km (4.3 mi) south of Dublin city centre.

== History ==
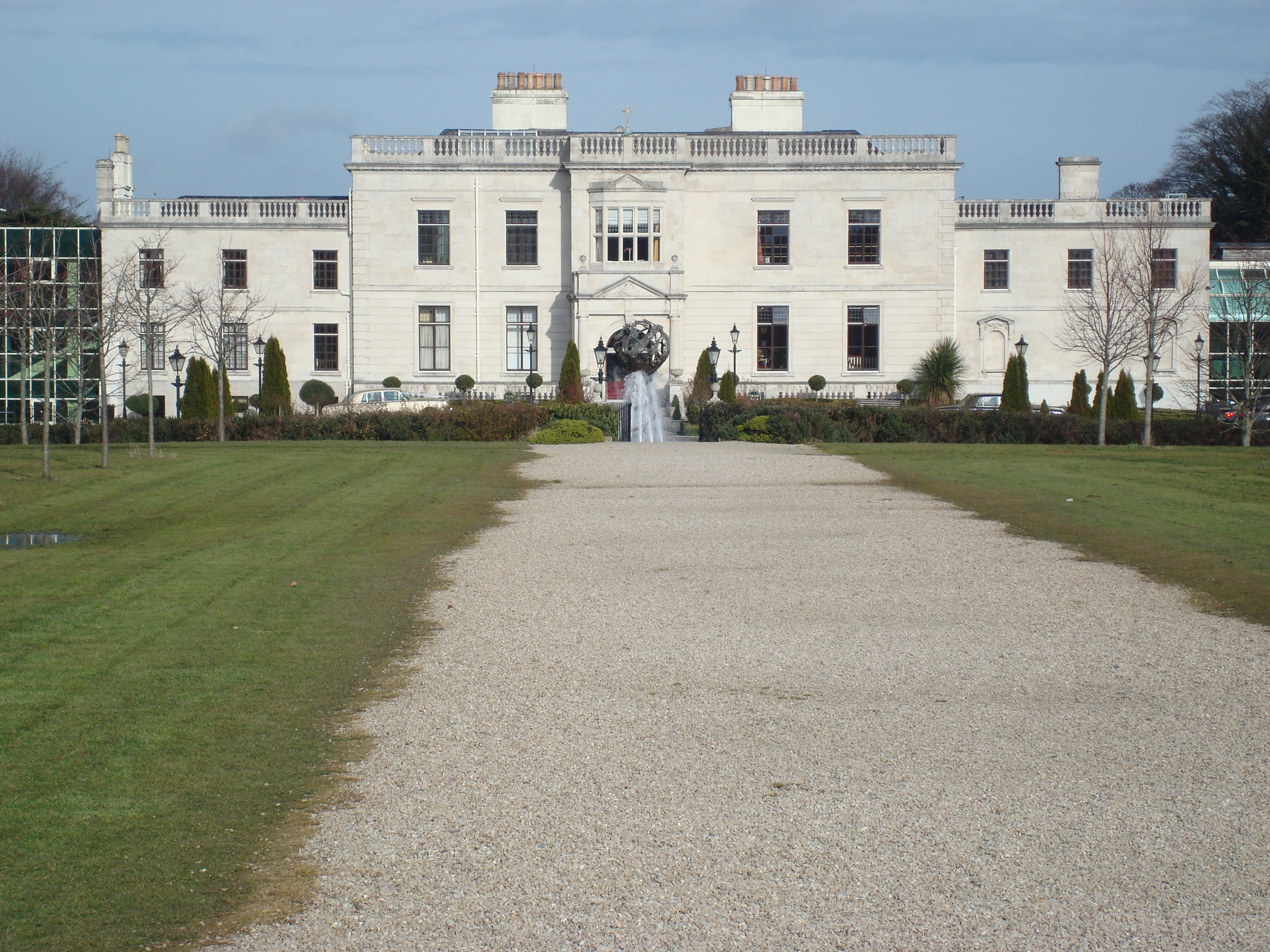
St. Helen's now the Radisson Hotel

There is some debate on the origin of the town name Booterstown. Historically known in English as "Ballyboother" the name "Booterstown" is an anglicised form of the original Irish name Baile an Bhóthair, meaning "The Town of the Road". In its original Irish form it shares the same name as Batterstown in County Meath, as well as Ballinvoher in Kilkenny, Cork, Kerry, Limerick, Longford and Mayo.

Booterstown lies along an ancient route once known as Slíghe Chualann, which connected the residence of the High King of Ireland at Tara with his outlying lands in Cualann. Cualann is the ancient name for the area of land stretching towards Bray (Irish: Brí Chualann).

However, there are also several references to the names "Butterstonne" and "Butterstown" from various historic maps eg Rocques etc.

"Butterstown" is also mentioned in "10 facts about Merrion and Booterstown", as follows: "Booterstown was once entirely agricultural, renowned for its rich farming land. Its original name was derived from the produce created, Butterstown, and this name lasted until the end of the 18th century. In those days, virtually the only building in the district was Booterstown Castle, which was incorporated into St Mary’s house, built in the 18th century and still there."

"The Queen’s After-Dinner Speech, as overhead and cut into Lengths of Poetry by Jamesy Murphy, Deputy-Assistant-Waiter at the Viceregal Lodge" states: " "An’ by Merrion roun’,” sez she, “To Buttherstown,” sez she,“Till I came to the ridge,” sez she "[1] This poem has been admirably recited by Ronnie Drew (of the Dubliners), "Sez She"

The Congregation of the Irish Christian Brothers had their headquarters at St. Helen's, Booterstown from 1925 to 1988. St. Helen's was built in 1760 for Thomas Cooley, MP and was known originally as Seamount. It was extensively refurbished a century later while in the ownership of Viscount Gough, Field Marshal of the British Army, whose wife Marie Frances opened the gardens to the public. The house is now a hotel of The Radisson Group.

Booterstown retains its link with the name Tara, as the Tara Towers hotel was built there in the 1970s on Merrion Road, next to the historical Bellevue Merrion Cemetery. The Tara Towers hotel was demolished in 2019.

In medieval times Booterstown formed with Mount Merrion the manor of Thorncastle.

== Transport ==
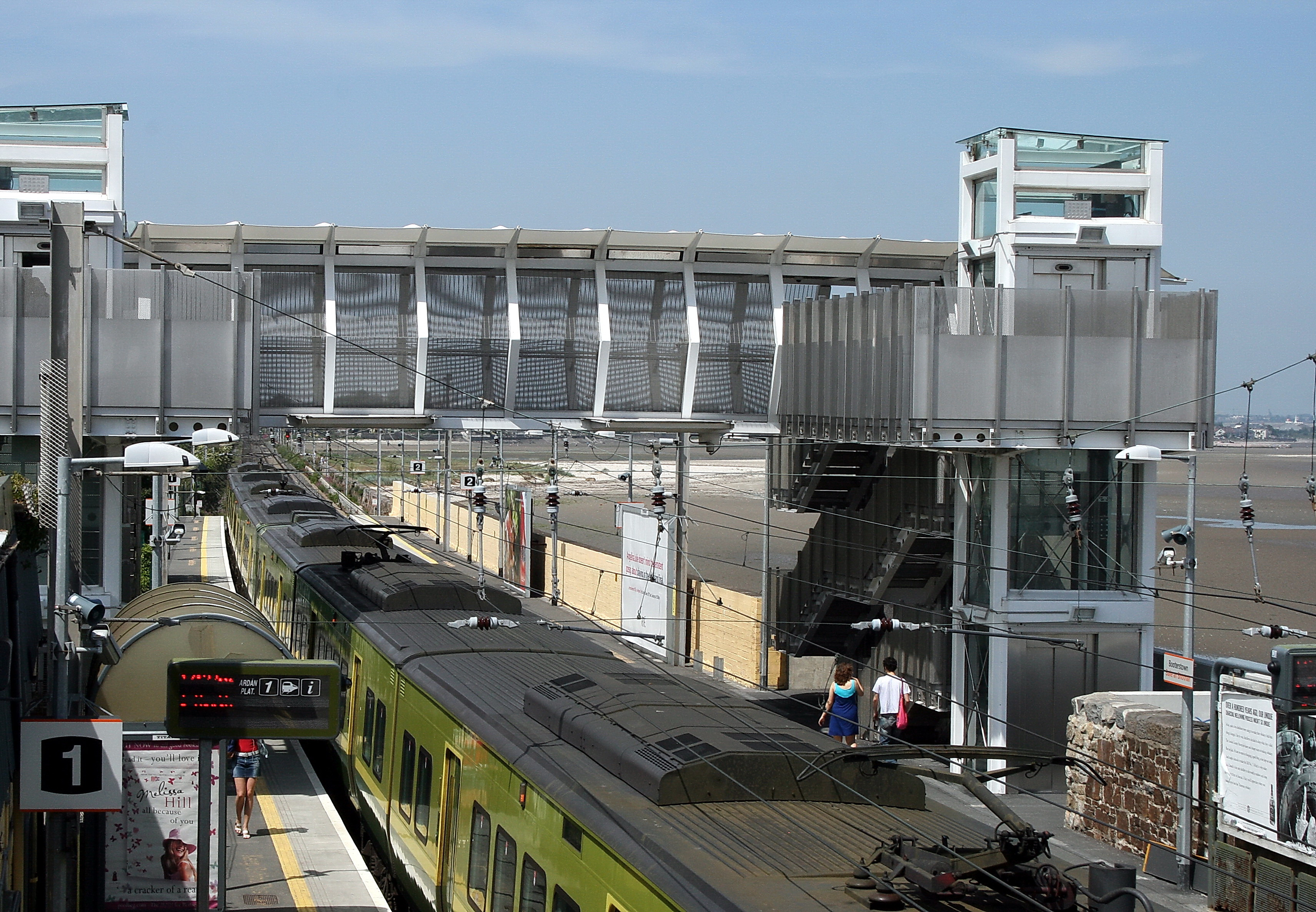
Booterstown DART Station

Booterstown borders Sandymount to the north, Merrion and Mount Merrion to the west, and Blackrock to the south, while along the coast to the southeast is the small district of Williamstown.

Booterstown is served by the DART, with a railway station between the stops of Blackrock and Sydney Parade. Booterstown railway station opened in January 1835 as part of the Dublin and Kingstown Railway.

Booterstown was served by the Dublin tramways routes 6, 7 and 8 until the tram lines ceased operations on 9 July 1949. Today the nearest tram is the Luas green line with stops at Sandyford and Stillorgan.

Booterstown is also served by two Quality Bus Corridors, Stillorgan and Blackrock, Dublin. A frequent Aircoach service links the area with Dublin Airport.

== Features ==
The area is home to Booterstown marsh, a bird sanctuary which has been leased for many years by An Taisce, who have worked to protect it. Species seen regularly include mallard, Eurasian teal, common moorhen, water rail, grey heron, little egret, common redshank, greenshank, Eurasian curlew, common snipe, Eurasian oystercatcher, bar-tailed godwit, common kingfisher, sedge warbler and dunlin.

The Catholic Church of the Assumption is a focal point of the area along Booterstown Avenue.

Booterstown has a dedicated Circus Field located along the Rock Road, where both Tom Duffy's Circus (June/July) and Fossett's Circus (October) are set up once a year.

The Old Punch Bowl pub, which stands at the bottom of Booterstown Avenue, was established in 1779.

Merrion Cemetery is an old cemetery that was used from the 13th century to 1866 and is located at Bellevue between Booterstown and Merrion off the Rock Road.

Booterstown was recorded in 1488 as one of the locations for the boundary of The Pale.

== Education ==
Primary schools in Booterstown include Booterstown National School (Cross Avenue), Our Lady of Mercy Girls School, St. Andrew's College, St. Mary's Boys National School, and Willow Park School.

Secondary schools serving the area include two Gaelscoileanna: Coláiste Eoin and Coláiste Íosagáin. It is also home to St. Andrew's College, which moved here from Clyde Road in 1973. Blackrock Educate Together Secondary School was established in 2021 to cater to the areas of Booterstown, Blackrock, and Dún Laoghaire. Other nearby post-primary schools include Blackrock College, Colaiste Eoin, Colaiste Iosagain, Dominican College.

== Churches ==
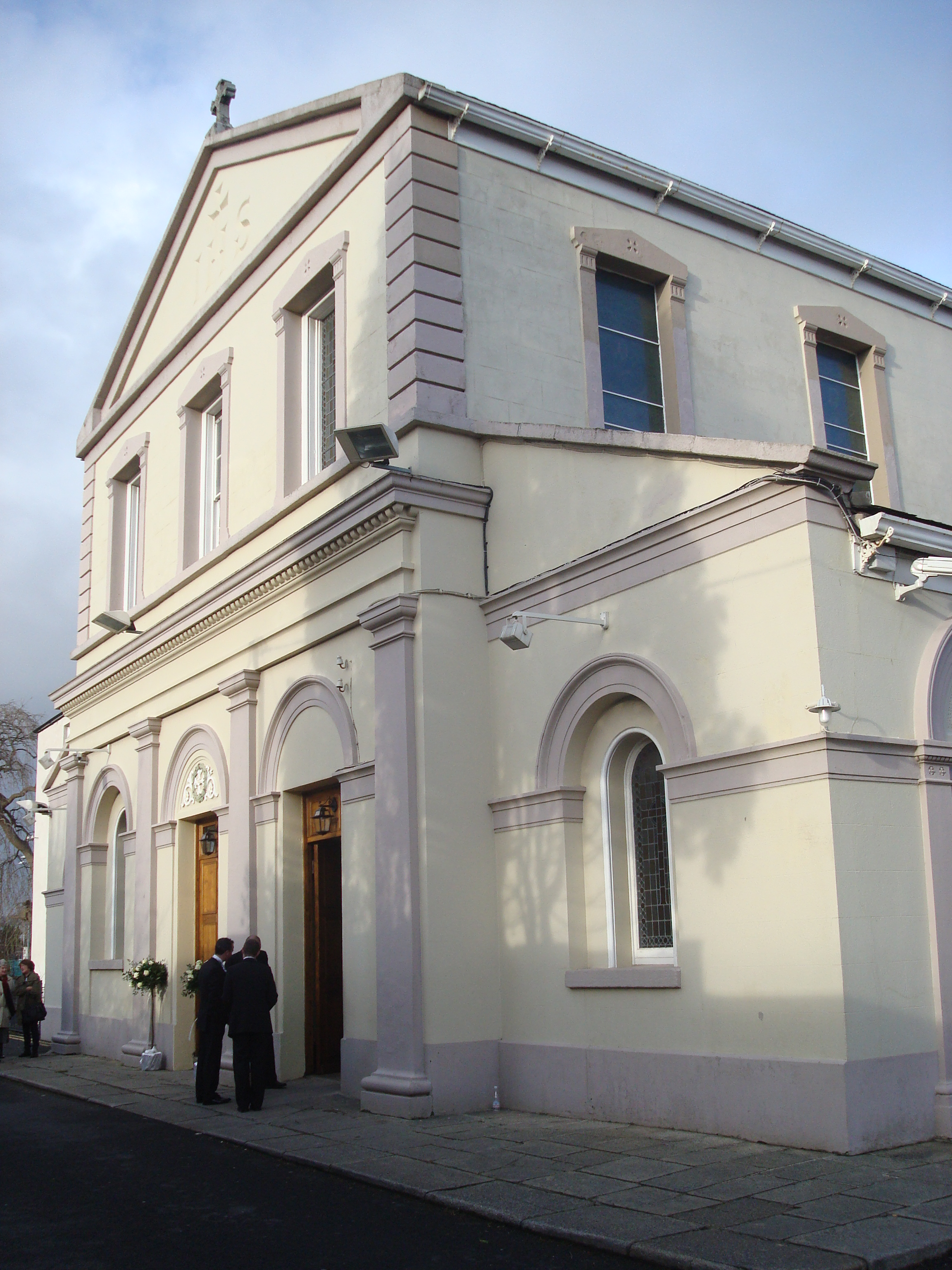
Church of the Assumption, Booterstown (1813)

Christian churches in the area include:

- Church of the Assumption, Booterstown (Roman Catholic)
- South Hill Evangelical Church, Booterstown (Evangelical)
- St. Andrew's, Mount Merrion Avenue (Presbyterian)
- St. Philip and St. James Church, Cross Avenue (Church of Ireland)

== Notable people ==
- Francis Elrington Ball, who lived at Booterstown House at one time, was an Irish author and legal historian, best known for his works The Judges in Ireland 1221–1921 and A history of the county of Dublin (Parts 1–6).
- Maziere Brady, Lord Chancellor of Ireland for almost 20 years was a native of Booterstown. His family owned what is now Willow Park School.
- Hugh Carleton, 1st Viscount Carleton, was an eminent judge, and at one time an owner of Willow Park.
- Kenny Carroll, Irish cricketer, born in Booterstown
- U Dhammaloka first Irish Buddhist.
- William Downes, 1st Baron Downes, Lord Chief Justice of Ireland, had a house called Merville in Booterstown, and died there in 1826.
- Seán MacBride, Irish government minister and prominent international politician, who lived in Booterstown. In his early life, while he was a member of the IRA, he was charged with the murder of Kevin O'Higgins in 1927.
- Eoin MacNeill, who lived on South Hill Avenue, Booterstown, was an Irish scholar, nationalist, revolutionary and politician.
- Richard Robert Madden lived at 4 Booterstown Avenue (a plaque is noted here) and on Vernon Terrace. He was an Irish doctor, writer, abolitionist and historian of the United Irishmen.
- John McCormack lived in Booterstown for a short while, in the house named "Glena", overlooking the sea opposite the Booterstown Marsh. He died there in 1945.
- Maurice Neligan was an Irish heart surgeon born in Booterstown, noted for carrying out Ireland's first coronary artery bypass graft in 1975, Ireland's first heart transplant in 1985 and an estimated 15,000 open heart surgery operations, many on children. He was also a founder of the nearby Blackrock Clinic.
- Kevin O'Higgins lived in a house called "Dunamase" and was the Minister for Justice in the Government of the Irish Free State. He was assassinated on the Booterstown end of Cross Avenue on his way to mass at the local parish church, Church of the Assumption, on 10 July 1927 by members of the IRA. It is believed that he was assassinated for ordering the execution of seventy-seven republicans during his tenure.
- Ryan Tubridy, Irish broadcaster, born in Booterstown.
- Barbara Verschoyle, Irish land agent and philanthropist
- Simon Watson, Irish portrait, interior, and travel photographer, born in Booterstown.

== See also ==
- List of towns and villages in Ireland
