= Carrickbrennan Churchyard =

Closed cemetery in Monkstown, Dún Laoghaire–Rathdown, Ireland

Coordinates: 53.289901°N 6.150617°W

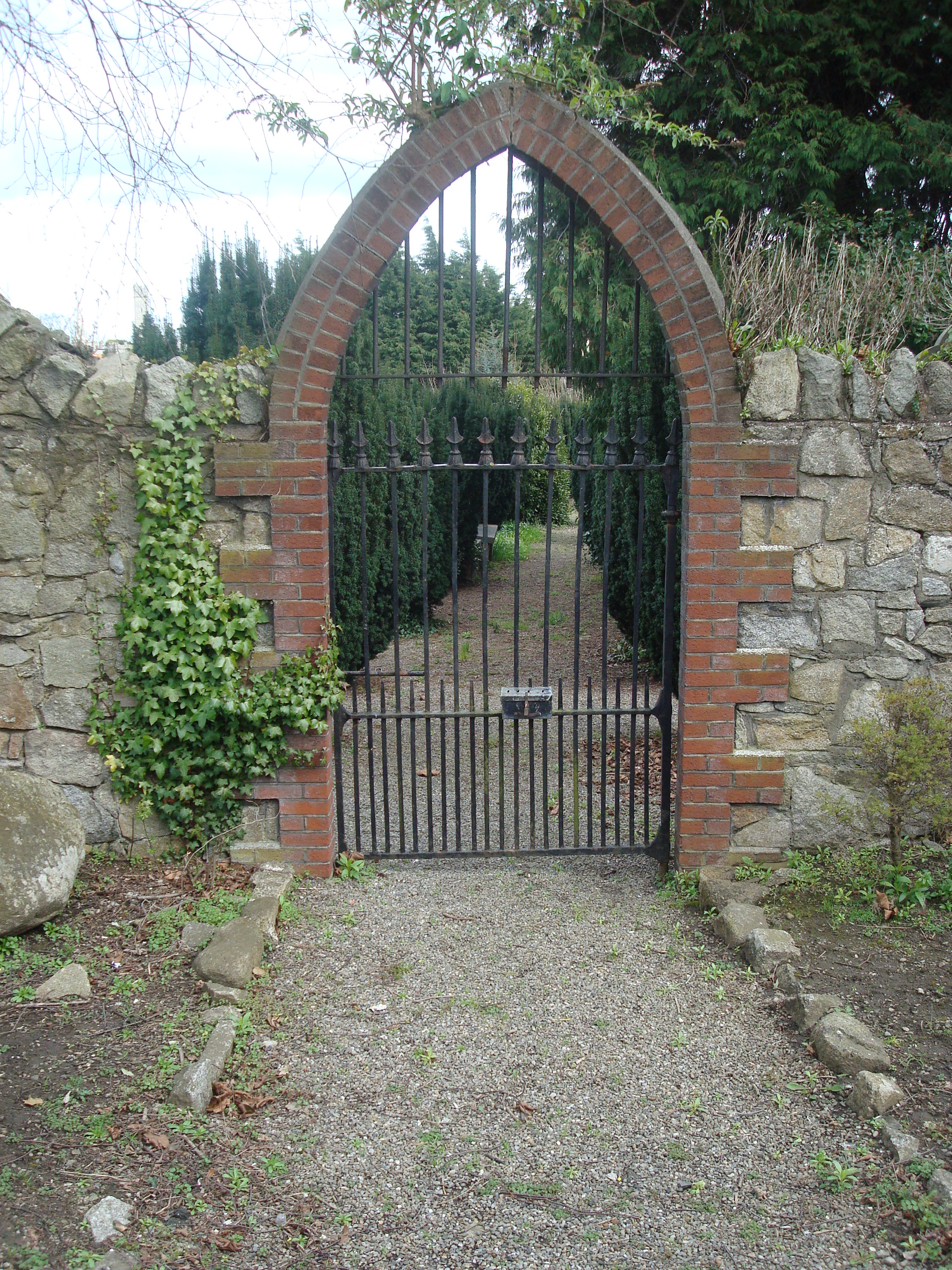
- Entrance
- Interactive map of Carrickbrennan Churchyard

Details
- Established: 6th century
- Closed: 1874 (last burial 1947)
- Location: Carrickbrennan Road, Monkstown, Dún Laoghaire–Rathdown
- Country: Ireland
- Type: Church of Ireland
- Size: 0.3 ha (0.74 acres)
- Find a Grave: Carrickbrennan Churchyard

Carrickbrennan Churchyard (Irish: Reilig Charraig Bhraonáin) located on Carrickbrennan Road, Monkstown, Dublin, Ireland is a graveyard that can still be seen today, but is no longer in use. It is notable as the burial place of many people who perished in local maritime disasters. The graveyard stands beside the grounds of Monkstown Park, former estate of Lord Ranelagh and latterly the historian Charles Haliday, now used as rugby pitches by CBC Monkstown Park.

== History ==
There used to be a medieval monastery at this site, dedicated to St Mochonna, a 6th-century bishop from Holmpatrick, Skerries. The monks were Cistercian and the monastery was subject to the chapter of St. Mary's Abbey, Dublin. The building fell into ruin and was replaced in 1668 by a church built by Edward Corker. Today this church lies in ruins, but in the 19th century the building was modified somewhat for use as a house for a watchman to deter body snatchers.

The nearby Monkstown Castle was also built by the Cistercian monks in the 13th–14th century, and later granted to Sir John Travers for his services to the Crown by King Henry VIII around the middle of the 16th century. Travers died 16 May 1562 and is buried here. The castle was later inherited by Mary Travers' nephew, Henry Cheevers, upon her death in 1601. Henry Cheevers died in 1640 and is also buried in the churchyard.

The churchyard was closed in 1874 due to fears of a cholera outbreak, but there were further burials as late as the 1950s.

In the 1980s the Carrickbrennan Graveyard Restoration Project restored the site by resetting headstones, fixing boundary walls, removing dangerous trees and restoring old ironwork. New trees were added including a Bhutan pine and a dawn redwood planted by Denis O'Connor Don, the president of the Dún Laoghaire Historical Society at the time. The site is now in the care of Dún Laoghaire–Rathdown County Council.

== Notable burials ==
One of the most notable burials here is that from 19 November 1807 where many of the 265 people who died on the Rochdale in the sinking of the Rochdale and the Prince of Wales are interred in the graveyard. It is noted that the 265 who died consisted of 1 major, 2 lieutenants, 1 ensign, 8 sergeants, 9 corporals, 173 rank and file, 42 women and 29 children. There is a memorial stone near the entrance to the graveyard for the captain of the Rochdale, Major Charles Gormocan, and a mound with a tombstone to the soldiers of the 97th regiment. On the same night 120 soldiers on board the Prince of Wales packet were drowned. They are interred in Merrion Cemetery with a similar memorial to the one found here.

On 9 February 1861 the Ajax, a coastguard vessel with its crew of Captain John McNeil Boyd and 5 other members, perished during a bad storm while attempting to rescue the crew of the Neptune, a brigantine that had hit the rocks of the east pier in Dún Laoghaire. The crew of the coastguard vessel were swept overboard by a large wave. All the bodies were recovered promptly except for Captain Boyd, found two weeks later. The 5 crew members who died are interred in the Carrickbrennan graveyard, which also has a memorial to Captain Boyd and the crew. The actual resting place of Captain Boyd is in the churchyard of St. Patrick's Cathedral where there is a monument as a memorial. The members of the Royal St. George Yacht Club also erected an obelisk monument to Captain Boyd on the east pier of Dún Laoghaire harbour.

Joseph Holt (1756–1826) was a United Irish general and leader of a large guerrilla force which fought against British troops in County Wicklow from June–October 1798 part of the 1798 rebellion. He was exiled to Australia in 1799 and returned to Ireland in 1814. He died in Kingstown on 16 May 1826 and is buried here.

Charles Haliday (1789–1866) was an Irish historian and antiquary who made significant contributions to the study of the history of Dublin, being particularly interested in the Scandinavian antiquities of the city. He died on 14 September 1866 and is buried here.

Sir William Betham (1779–1853) was the Ulster King of Arms from 1820 until his death in 1853. He had previously served as the Deputy Ulster from 1807 to 1820. He died on 26 October 1853 and is buried here with a cast iron monument.

== See also ==
- Sinking of the Rochdale and the Prince of Wales
